= Bailey Park (song) =

Single by Tullycraft
- A-side: "Bailey Park"
- B-side: "Sweet / Pedal"
- Released: July 1995
- Genre: twee
- Label: Cher Doll Records
- Songwriter: Sean Tollefson
- Producer: Pat Maley

Tullycraft singles chronology
| "True Blue" (1995) | "Bailey Park" (1995) | "1st String Teenage High" (1996) |

"Bailey Park" is a song by Tullycraft, recorded with producer Pat Maley in the Capitol Theater at Yoyo Studios in Olympia, Washington. The birds heard at the beginning of the track are not a sample, Maley hung a second microphone out of a second floor theatre window while Tollefson was recording his vocals. The birds heard on the track are downtown Olympia birds recorded at the same time as the vocals. Guitarist Gary Miklusek said: "'Bailey Park' ranks as a top song for me. Live it was a blast to play and almost a guaranteed string-breaker… perhaps my only sore memories of Tullycraft."

"Sweet" was released as the B-side of the single for "Bailey Park". The track also appeared on the band's debut album Old Traditions, New Standards. In 2007, the song was used in a television commercial for the hot-dog chain Wienerschnitzel. It was licensed without the band's knowledge or permission. The licensing was handled by Darla, the California-based record label that had reissued Old Traditions, New Standards. Tullycraft were not very happy when they learned of the commercial.

"Pedal" was a short re-working of the song that Tollefson had written and recorded with the band Crayon. Pat Maley introduced the idea and even integrated samples of Beat Happening and Tiger Trap from master tapes found in the studio. The idea was to spoof a Pet Shop Boys dance track. In 1997, the Vancouver-based band, Gaze covered the song "Pedal" on their So Sad single.

== Track listing ==
1. "Bailey Park"
2. "Sweet"
3. "Pedal"

== Personnel ==
- Sean Tollefson – vocals, bass
- Jeff Fell – drums
- Gary Miklusek – guitar, backing vocals
- Pat Maley – production, audio engineering
- Aaron Gorseth – production assistance
- Rose Melberg – backing vocals on "Pedal"
