= Every Scene Needs a Center =

Studio album by Tullycraft
- Released: October 23, 2007
- Recorded: Soundhouse Studios, Seattle, WA
- Genre: Indie pop
- Length: 47:42
- Label: Magic Marker (MMR 042)
- Producer: Kip Beelman

Tullycraft chronology
Disenchanted Hearts Unite (2005)	Every Scene Needs a Center (2007)	Lost in Light Rotation (2013)

Professional ratings
Review scores
Source	Rating
AllMusic	4/5 stars

Every Scene Needs a Center is the fifth studio album from the indiepop band Tullycraft. Arguably, the band’s most ambitious album, Every Scene Needs A Center ranges from punky bursts to mid-tempo near-ballads. The band spent over a year working on the mini-epic album, splitting time between a professional recording studio and their own studio, recording entirely on analog tape. The album reached #29 on the CMJ Top 200 chart in 2007.

== Track listing ==
All tracks by Tullycraft except where noted.

1. "The Punks Are Writing Love Songs"
2. "Fangs on Bats"
3. "Georgette Plays a Goth"
4. "Bored to Hear Your Heart Still Breaks"
5. "Clique at Night Vandals"
6. "Dracula Screams of Tiger Style (Parts One & Two)"
7. "The Lonely Life of the UFO Researcher"
8. "A Cursed Miss Maybellene"
9. "If You Take Away the Make-Up (Then the Vampires They Will Die)"
10. "Misgiving" (New Bad Things)
11. "The Neutron"
12. "One Essex Girl"
13. "The Secret History of Devil's Paw"
14. "We Know You're Cute, You Told Us"

== Personnel ==
Tullycraft

- Sean Tollefson – vocals, bass
- Jeff Fell – drums, xylophone
- Chris Munford – guitar, keyboard, backing vocals
- Jenny Mears – vocals, backing vocals, tambourine
- Corianton Hale – lead guitar, backing vocals, melodica

Additional

- Kip Beelman & Chris Munford – recording, audio engineering, production
- Saundrah Humphrey – violin on "Dracula Screams Of Tiger Style Pt.1 & Pt.2"
- Evan Mosher – trumpet on "Bored To Hear Your Heart Still Breaks" & "The Secret History Of Devil's Paw"
