= 1st String Teenage High =

EP by Tullycraft
- Released: 1996
- Genre: Twee pop
- Label: Little Teddy Recordings
- Producer: Pat Maley

Tullycraft chronology
Bailey Park (1995)	1st String Teenage High (1996)	Glove Puppet (1996)

Tullycraft released the 1st String Teenage High 7" EP on the German label Little Teddy Recordings in 1996. The four songs were exclusive, but reappeared on The Singles CD released in 1999. The songs were recorded and mixed at Yoyo Studios in Olympia, Washington.

== Track listing ==
1. A1 1st String Teenage High
2. A2 Not Quite Burning Bridges
3. B1 Piano Lessons For Beauty Queens
4. B2 Stay Cool I'll See You This Summer

== Personnel ==
- Sean Tollefson – vocals, bass
- Jeff Fell – drums
- Gary Miklusek – guitar, backing vocals
- Pat Maley – production, audio engineering
- Aaron Gorseth – production assistance
