= Laptop twee =

Music genre

- Stylistic origins: Twee pop; indietronica; indie pop
- Cultural origins: 2020s, United States, United Kingdom and Canada
- Typical instruments: Vocals; guitar; drum machines; DAW

Other topics
- Nina Protocol; bedroom pop; digicore; cloud rock; internet music; hyperpop; plugg

Laptop twee is a style of twee pop that blends indie pop and indietronica with influences drawing from electronic music and primarily DAW-based internet-native production. The genre emerged in the early 2020s, originally coined by the Canadian blogger and musician friends&.

Notable acts include 300skullsandcounting, Bassvictim, Worldpeace DMT, ear, Cootie Catcher, MASSI, ASC, Cicada, Feeble Little Horse, the sound chalk makes, Luko M, the Femcels, b7anket, Josephine's Next Million Miles, and Amigos Imaginarios.

== Characteristics ==
According to the Chicago Reader, laptop twee is "difficult to describe" as well as "a strange burgoo of performatively fragile 2000s indie pop refracted through a couple decades of hyperactive dance music". The Guardian stated that the style encompasses "a host of younger artists who also balance whimsy with warped electronics". Paste labels some laptop twee acts as placing "foreground DAW chaos as the main event", as well as drawing from the "analog ethos of twee filtered through hyper-online, internet-native production". Music journalist Jude Noel, writing for Pitchfork, described laptop twee as fusing "the genre-smashing maximalism promised by hyperpop with the whimsical optimism of '00s buzz bands". Noel cites friends&'s label dawk26 as declaring "cracked software and makeshift desktop studios are the contemporary equivalent to the cheap four-track".

Music journalist Samuel Hyland writing for Pitchfork, described laptop twee as "loopy and wonderfully giddy, running 2000s indie-pop through Ableton plugins". While Ana Gaca noted laptop twee's "post-internet multiplicity and unpolished, out-of-focus aesthetic". In a Nina Protocol article on laptop twee, friends& described the style as "when a traditional twee pop song is produced in a way that feels distinctly post-hyperpop". Music journalist Eli Enis references laptop twee's internet-native groups and use of DAW-based production as a prime feature of the genre. He defines the style as "what if Belle & Sebastian were really into Bladee in high-school?". Writing for Pitchfork, music journalist Kieran Press-Reynolds described laptop twee as "a slew of new artists who rewire precious twee and indie pop aesthetics with intricate sound design, fatass sleaze bass, or otherwise cracked 2020s style-shards".

== History ==
JC grame performing as friends& in 2026

The term "laptop twee" was originally coined by the Canadian blogger and musician JC grame, also known as friends&. According to the Chicago Reader, grame had coined the term in 2025 to describe the indie pop music of Worldpeace DMT's album The Velvet Underground & Rowan. Writing for Pitchfork, music journalist Samuel Hyland stated that the genre came to shape through Bassvictim's Forever and Worldpeace DMT's The Velvet Underground & Rowan. The label was later adopted by sites such as Nina Protocol and music journalist Eli Enis' blog Chasing Sundays.

According to Paste, Feeble Little Horse's 2023 album Girl with Fish helped pioneer the laptop twee style "before it even had a name". Music journalist Shaad D'Souza labelled Worldpeace DMT and the Femcels as "the prime emissaries" of laptop twee. Although, D'Souza stated that Worldpeace DMT's mixtape Flowers Powers seemed to separate them from the label through an emphasis on '60s pop influences. Eli Enis notes Frost Children's 2023 album Hearth Room as fitting the laptop twee genre.

The American group ear's album Rumspringa has been described as laptop twee. The group are recognized as one of the leading figures in the scene alongside Worldpeace DMT and the Femcels. Other notable artists in the genre include Cootie Catcher, Amigos Imaginarios, 300skullsandcounting, the sound chalk makes, MASSI, ASC, Cicada, Josephine's Next Million Miles, Luko M, and b7anket. Clash described the EP "IT'S NICE TO SEE YOU HERE" by Pamela. as going from "00s indie rock guitars through to laptop twee aspects".

== See also ==
- Bedroom pop
- Cloud rock
- SoundCloud indie
