= The Singles (Tullycraft album) =

Compilation album by Tullycraft
- Released: 1999
- Genre: Indie pop
- Length: 1:00:14
- Label: Darla Records (DRL 102)

Tullycraft chronology
City of Subarus (1998)	The Singles (1999)	Beat Surf Fun (2002)

Professional ratings
Review scores
Source	Rating
Allmusic	link

The Singles is a singles, b-sides and rarities compilation CD from the indie pop band Tullycraft. It compiles early seven inch singles & split singles, compilation tracks, and a couple live radio performances. The majority of the songs were recorded during the period between the band's first two albums, Old Traditions, New Standards and City of Subarus.

== Track listing ==
1. "Skyway"
2. "Superboy & Supergirl"
3. "Pop Songs Your New Boyfriend's Too Stupid to Know About"
4. "Pink Lemonade"
5. "Bailey Park"
6. "Pedal" [Crayon]
7. "Josie"
8. "1st String Teenage High"
9. "Not Quite Burning Bridges"
10. "Piano Lessons for Beauty Queens"
11. "Stay Cool I'll See You This Summer"
12. "Falling Out of Love (with you)" [6ths]
13. "Guyana Punch" [Judy's]
14. "She's Got the Beat" [Judy's]
15. "Break Seaside (and over)"
16. "Maybe Baby" [Ninjas]
17. "Heroes and Villains" [Pooh Sticks]
18. "They're Not Trying on the Dance Floor" [Jonathan Richman]
19. "8 Great Ways"
20. "Crush the Scene (live)"
21. "Look How We Killed the Riot Grrrls (live)"
22. "Loveless (live)" [New Order]

== Personnel ==
- Sean Tollefson – vocals, bass
- Jeff Fell – drums, bass
- Gary Miklusek – guitar, backing vocals, keyboard
- Chris Munford – guitar, keyboard, backing vocals
- Harold Hollingsworth – lead guitar

== Addition personnel ==
- Jen Abercrombie – vocals on "Heroes and Villains"
- Robynn Iwata – vocals on "Josie"
- Pat Maley – backing vocals on "Guyana Punch"
- Rose Melberg – backing vocals on "Pedal"
