= Weekends Away =

EP by Math and Physics Club
- Released: 2005
- Genre: Indie pop, twee pop
- Label: Matinée Recordings

Math and Physics Club chronology
Weekends Away (2005)	Movie Ending Romance (2005)

Weekends Away is the first EP from Seattle, Washington indie pop band Math and Physics Club and was released in February 2005.

The band's initial demo attracted the attention of both Jimmy Tassos of Matinee Recordings and the influential KEXP DJ John Richards. As they played their second show in December, they were already receiving considerable attention, including frequent spins on KEXP and WOXY.

The band's original demo featured four songs in nearly the same sequence, with "Nothing Really Happened" in place of "Love, Again." The demo version of "Nothing Really Happened" was released on a compilation called Strength in Numbers in mid-2005, and the song was re-recorded in 2007 for belated release on their third EP Baby I'm Yours. The song "Love, Again" was recorded after the first demo sessions and added to the EP before release.

"Sixteen and Pretty" garnered exposure and airplay for the band, leading to the band's appearance at the 2005 Sasquatch Festival.

Pitchfork Media wrote that they "set the match of literate, vivid lyrics and irrepressible melody to their faded-picturebook boy/girl harmonies" and KEXP described the EP as "utterly charming." Allmusic said that the "band's first EP is a four track gem that manages to escape any charges of imitation by delivering four very strong songs loaded with tender emotion and easy going charm."

== Track listing ==
1. "Weekends Away"
2. "Sixteen and Pretty"
3. "Love, Again"
4. "When We Get Famous"
