= Shoot the Point =

Studio album by Tullycraft
- Released: August 22, 2025
- Recorded: Seattle, Washington
- Studio: Dubtrain Studio
- Genre: Indie pop
- Length: 36:02
- Label: Happy Happy Birthday To Me (HHBTM 233)

Tullycraft chronology
The Railway Prince Hotel (2019)	Shoot the Point (2025)

Professional ratings
Review scores
Source	Rating
AllMusic	4/5 stars

Shoot the Point is the eighth studio album by American band Tullycraft, released by Happy Happy Birthday To Me Records on August 22, 2025. After a six-year break, the album was the band's first since The Railway Prince Hotel in 2019. This was the third in a trilogy of records recorded and engineered by Pete Remine at Dubtrain Studio in Seattle, WA.

== Reception ==
"Tullycraft are Seattle cuddlecore legends, now in their 30th year of making hyperactive, winsome, and very twee punky indiepop... It’s a Tullycraft album through and through: sing-along choruses, trade-off boy/girl vocals, and a fondness for songs about bands and music obsessives. Shoot the Point is full of them, including “Jeanie’s Up Again and Blaring Faith by The Cure,” “Street Hassle Plays on Repeat,” and “Modern Lovers.” May Tullycraft never retire their cardigans." - BrooklynVegan

"When I listened to Shoot the Point, their first new album in six years, it felt like unwrapping a gift to my inner teen, and I couldn’t stop smiling. This is classic Tullycraft, packed full of cheeky references, rhinestones, sweet “sha-la-la-la” harmonies, evocative storytelling, and, of course, tambourines. The album recalls the band's 2007 indie-pop vampire concept album, Every Scene Needs a Center—the lyrics conjure a vivid picture of the goth, punk, and New Wave world, with songs like “Jeanie’s Up Again and Blaring Faith by the Cure” (an ode to a morose, born-too-late Robert Smith fangirl) and “Love on the Left Bank” (the story of a tumultuous fling that begins at a Libertines show)." - The Stranger

== Track listing ==
All tracks by Tullycraft

1. "The Ledge"
2. "Turnstiles"
3. "Jeanie’s Up Again and Blaring Faith by the Cure"
4. "Love on the Left Bank"
5. "Street Hassle Plays on Repeat"
6. "Rhinestone Tease"
7. "Tarrytown"
8. "Purple Leopard Print Suitcase"
9. "Modern Lovers"
10. "Clear Nail Polish"
11. "Well-Rehearsed Reveal"

== Personnel ==
- Sean Tollefson – vocals
- Chris Munford – guitar, vocals, bass, keyboard
- Jenny Mears – vocals
- Corianton Hale – guitar, vocals, tambourine, melodica, ukulele, accordion

== Additional players ==
- Guy Patterson – drums (tracks: 1–9)
- Ethan Jones – bass (tracks: 1, 2, 4, 6, 8, 9)
- Evan Mosher – trumpet (tracks: 3, 5, 6, 9)
- Pete Remine – lap steel (track: 5)

== Videos ==
A video for "Jeanie’s Up Again and Blaring Faith by the Cure" was released ahead of the album in July 2025.

== Limited edition ==
A limited-edition blue vinyl version of the LP was available at Rough Trade shops in the UK.
