= Rumspringa (disambiguation) =

Rumspringa is a rite of passage among Amish and other communities

Rumspringa may also refer to:

- Rumspringa (band), from Los Angeles, California, U.S.
- Rumspringa, 2009 EP by The Weeks (band)
- Rumspringa, 2011 album by Canon Blue
- Rumspringa, 2026 album by Ear
- Rumspringa, a seasonal beer by Lancaster Brewing Company, Pennsylvania, U.S.
