= Beat Surf Fun =

Studio album by Tullycraft
- Released: March 5, 2002
- Genre: Indie pop
- Length: 35:25
- Label: Magic Marker Records (US); Little Teddy (Germany)

Tullycraft chronology
The Singles (2000)	Beat Surf Fun (2002)	Disenchanted Hearts Unite (2005)

Professional ratings
Review scores
Source	Rating
AllMusic	4/5 stars

Beat Surf Fun is the third studio album from the indiepop band Tullycraft. The entire album was recorded on analog tape at a practice space the band rented in Ballard, WA. It is the first record the band released on the Portland-based Magic Marker Records. The album included the single "Wild Bikini" and the international indie pop hit "Twee." Beat Surf Fun also marks the first appearance of vocalist, Jenny Mears, who would eventually join Tullycraft. The design of the CD back card can be confusing since it lists the title of the album on the sides as "Fun Beat Surf" and "Surf Beat Fun" respectively.

== Track listing ==
All tracks by Tullycraft except where noted.

1. "Twee" – 3:23
2. "Glitter & Twang" – 4:09
3. "Christine, ND" (Six Cents and Natalie) – 3:18
4. "Wild Bikini" – 2:34
5. "DIY Queen" – 4:19
6. "Cowgirls On Parade" – 3:12
7. "I Kept The Beach Boys" – 2:27
8. "Orange Cake Mix" – 1:50
9. "Knockout" (Benji Cossa) – 1:55
10. "Radio Theme" – 0:46
11. "Sent To The Moon" – 4:17
12. "Who Needs What" (Jim Guthrie) – 3:15

== Personnel ==
Tullycraft

- Sean Tollefson – vocals, bass, keyboard
- Jeff Fell – drums, guitar
- Chris Munford – guitar, keyboard, backing vocals | recording, audio engineering
- Jenny Mears – vocals, backing vocals
- Harold Hollingsworth – lead guitar

Additional

- Gabriel Stewart – viola on "I Kept The Beach Boys"
