= Harriet Records =

American independent record label

Harriet Records was an American independent record label based out of Cambridge, Massachusetts. The label was founded by Harvard history professor Tim Alborn in 1989. The label was named for the children's book Harriet the Spy. The majority of Harriet's releases were indie pop 7" vinyl singles, but eventually they started releasing full length CDs. Harriet gave a number of notable artists their start. John Darnielle, Wimp Factor 14, My Favorite, Crayon, Six Cents and Natalie, Tullycraft, and The Magnetic Fields all released early records on Harriet. After forty-five singles and ten CDs Harriet shut its doors in 1998.

== Discography ==
- 1 High Risk Group - Flag (7") Nov 1989
- 2 Fertile Virgin - Lucky Day (7") May 1990
- 3 Linda Smith - Gorgeous Weather (7") May 1990
- 4 Scarlet Drops - Sweet Happiness (7") Sep 1990
- 5 Wimp Factor 14 - Train Song (7") Mar 1991
- 6 High Risk Group - Daddy Rolex (7") Mar 1991
- 7 The Magnetic Fields - 100,000 Fireflies (7") Sep 1991
- 8 Pop Smear - Angel Talk (7") Sep 1991
- 9 Crayon - Matchbox (7") Sep 1991
- 10 Mecca Normal - How Many Now (7") Jan 1992
- 11 Scarlet Drops - Cling (7") Jun 1992
- 12 Crayon - Moominland (7") Jun 1992
- 13 Pinky - I'm on the Inside (7") Aug 1992
- 14 Six Cents and Natalie - Boyfriends (7") Aug 1992
- 15 Wimp Factor 14 - Botch (7") Oct 1992
- 16 High Risk Group - Pulsed (7") Oct 1992
- 17 The Magnetic Fields - Long Vermont Roads (7") Dec 1992
- 18 Lotus Eaters US - Falling (7") Feb 1993
- 19 Crayon - The Snaptight Wars (7") Aug 1993
- 20 Twig - Fall of Love (7") May 1993
- 21 Ampersands - Postcards (7") Oct 1993
- 22 The Extra Glenns - Infidelity (7") Nov 1993
- 23 Wimp Factor 14 - Miracle Mile (7") Oct 1993
- 24 Bagpipe Operation - Mt. Lavaty (7") Mar 1994
- 25 Pest - Philosophically Dyslexic (7") Mar 1994
- 26 Lotus Eaters US - Too Late (7") May 1994
- 27 Split-Release - Harriet Split Single (7") May 1994
- 29 Vehicle Flips - Our Returning Champion (7") Nov 1994
- 29 My Pretty Finger - A Season of Light (7") May 1995
- 30 Tullycraft - True Blue (7") May 1995
- 31 The Receptionists - Keep Your Secrets (7") Jul 1995
- 33 Hula Boy - January 17, 1912 (7") Jul 1995
- 34 Ampersands - Annabel Bleach (7") Nov 1996
- 35 My Favorite - The Informers And Us (7")
- 36 Prickly - Fancy Party Hairdo (7") Apr 1996
- 37 Caramel - My Tailor Is Rich (7") 1996
- 38 Vehicle Flips - Terminus (7") 1997
- 39 Orans - Windfall (7") 1997
- 40 Split-Release - Tullycraft / Rizzo (7") 1997
- 41 Tokidoki - News Days (7") 1997
- 42 Split-Release - My Favorite / Mad Planets (7") 1998
- 43 Pest 5000 - Page 43 (7") 1998
- 44 Shy Camp - Call in Sick (7") 1998
- 45 The Cannanes - A Fine Line between Pleasure and Pain (7") 1998
- SPY 1 Wimp Factor 14 - Ankle Deep (CD) Aug 1993
- SPY 2 Crayon - Brick Factory (CD) Mar 1994
- SPY 3 Various Artists - The Long Secret (CD) Jan 1995
- SPY 4 Vehicle Flips - In Action (CD) Sep 1995
- SPY 5 Tullycraft - Old Traditions, New Standards (CD)(LP on Little Teddy Recordings) 1996
- SPY 6 Prickly - Velleity (CD) 1997
- SPY 7 Linda Smith - Preference: Selected Songs, 1987-1991 (CD) 1997
- SPY 8 Hula Boy - As Tight as an Owl (CD) 1997
- SPY 9 Musical Chairs - Wits' End (CD) 1998
- SPY 10 Various Artists - Friendly Society (CD) 1998

== See also ==
- List of record labels
