= Folx =

2026 studio album by friends&

Studio album by friends&
- Released: February 17, 2026
- Genres: Glitch pop; folktronica; plunderphonics; twee; sampledelia
- Length: 92:55
- Label: dawk26
- Producers: friends&

Friends& chronology
The Rock Band: Stem Fragmentation and Syncopation Exercises #1–7 w/ Supplemental Materials (2024)	Folx (2026)

Folx (stylized in lowercase) is the second studio album by the Canadian music collective friends&, released independently through Bandcamp on February 17, 2026. It is a 112-track maximalist concept album, with lead member JC grame as well as journalists and critics identifying themes of the history of folk music, shitpost culture, anti-capitalism, Marxism, family, the Internet, copyright law and sampling, the autism spectrum, corporate labor, the economy of the United States, accelerationism, the life and work of Mark Fisher, and the Sonic the Hedgehog fandom in it. The album began conceptualization, composition, recording and production circa 2017 according to grame, and makes use of artificial intelligence along with a multitude of samples, with sources including dialogue and music from My Little Pony: Friendship Is Magic, vocals from songs by the Beatles and dialogue and music from O Brother, Where Art Thou?

== Background ==
JC grame performing as friends& in 2026

JC grame is a Canadian electronic musician and blogger based in Toronto. Grame initially independently released the album Shadowdog under the name tirestires in 2015, which was met with a cult following owing to its mysterious presentation, dense production and explicit lyrics concerning experiences in the furry fandom. In 2024, grame released the first friends& album, The Rock Band: Stem Fragmentation and Syncopation Exercises #1-7 w/ Supplemental Materials, through the independent music label Retrac Recordings. He also coined the microgenre term "laptop twee"; it has been used in contemporary indie music journalism to describe acts such as Frost Children, Bassvictim, 300skullsandcounting, Worldpeace DMT, ASC, MASSI, and Rowan Please.

According to the Guardian and Pitchfork, "friends&" is a Discord server of Canadian members, with grame at its core performing as "a semi-anonymous sampledelia band". The album was credited to them and released on Bandcamp on February 17, 2026, accompanied by liner notes and a manifesto written and published on Google Docs, which was later made unavailable. With no clarification being given as to if it was genuine or sardonic, the first line of the manifesto stated that the album was "written after bumping AJR and reading Capitalist Realism 300 times". The album is dedicated to grame's father, "an autistic rateyourmusic user who died before he could retire from his job at td bank"; his username on the website is named in the album's Bandcamp description.

== Music and production ==
According to grame, Folx began as a Facebook message "sent at 11:55am on june 16th 2017", and took "8 years, 8 months, and 1 day to complete". grame stated the record was conceived as "an attempt to reinvent pop music production"; Stereogum described it as a maximalist album. The album makes use of several musical samples from the Beatles, O Brother, Where Art Thou?, and My Little Pony: Friendship Is Magic, to motifs lifted from songs such as the Knack's 1979 single "My Sharona", with references to folk and classic rock artists Bob Dylan, Dolly Parton, John Prine, Cat Stevens, James Taylor, Johnny Cash, and the Grateful Dead. The album uses artificial intelligence to clone the voices of several individuals; one notable example is the singing voice of Jeff Mangum of American indie folk band Neutral Milk Hotel. Pitchfork described the album as blending "hyperpop's futurism" with "millennial optimism". While Stereogum cited tracks referencing philosophical and political theory, including the works of Marx and Engels, Deleuze and Guattari and Mark Fisher.

== Critical reception ==
Professional ratings
Review scores
Source	Rating
Pitchfork	5.7/10

Stereogum reviewed the album on February 23, 2026; writer Chris DeVille stated that "folx is an album with a manifesto and a bibliography. [...] Because grame was forged in the fires of RYM, folx is the kind of album where a Burial melody or the whistling from "Young Folks" might appear out of nowhere — and with that in mind, Girl Talk also feels like a relevant forebear. But Gregg Gillis never built anything quite so thematically dense. I don't know how often I will listen to folx — it does not lend itself to casually kicking back — but every time I've pressed play, I've been impressed."

Pitchfork reviewed the album on February 26, 2026, rating it a 5.7/10, with the publication's writer Samuel Hyland concluding that there was affirmatively "a compelling statement" in, polemically speaking, "a clusterfuck weighed down by conflicting ambitions [...] a desperate, brute-force attempt".

== Track listing ==
All tracks are written by friends&.

No.	Title	Length
1.	"[...] in its blind unrestrainable passion, its were-wolf hunger for surplus-labour, capital oversteps not only the moral, but even the merely physical maximum bounds of the working-day."	0:04
2.	"It usurps the time for growth, development, and healthy maintenance of the body."	0:09
3.	"At Seventeen ([werewolf] w [impulsive borderline personality disorder] [cracks logic] to [produce] @ [the instrument store]) ([mUsIc_wIlL_Be_mY_PrOfEsSiOn])"	2:20
4.	"This instant is insomniac, amnesiac; it locks us into a reactive time, which is always full ([...]). There is no continuous time in which shadows can grow, only a time that is simultaneously seamless ([...]) and discontinuous"	0:02
5.	"Mr. Tambourine Man ([muse] w [insomnia] [bootlegs] to [dream] @ [the housing complex]) ([nOt_lIvInG_WiTh_mY_DaD_AnYmOrE])"	1:40
6.	"The machine accommodates itself to the weakness of the human being in order to make the weak human being into a machine."	0:02
7.	"Man of Constant Sorrow ([android] w [autism] [phishes] to [network] @ [the city upon a hill]) ([bOyFrIeNd_qUeSt_bEgInS])"	1:53
8.	"Deprived of memory and the capacity to dream, the androids can be wounded but not traumatised. Yet there are signs that precisely this capacity to experience trauma is developing [...]"	0:03
9.	"Catch the Wind ([fairy] w [bipolar mania] [indecently exposes] to [impress] @ [the coworking space]) ([cAsUaLlY_DaTiNg_iN_SeArCh_oF_SoMeThInG_SeRiOuS])"	1:49
10.	"Such fantastic pictures of future society, painted at a time when the proletariat is still in a very undeveloped state and has but a fantastic conception of its own position,"	0:01
11.	"correspond with the first instinctive yearnings of that class for a general reconstruction of society."	0:53
12.	"Amazing Grace ([genie] w [alcohol addiction] [abets] to [collaborate] @ [the campaign fundraiser]) ([fAlLiNg_mAdLy_iN_LoVe_wItH_My_nEw_bOsS])"	2:02
13.	"In time-honored fairy tale fashion, however, the acts of wish fulfillment quickly become traumatic and catastrophic."	0:08
14.	"Jolene ([gargoyle] w [panic disorder] [assaults] to [de-escalate] @ [the third space]) ([iT_WaS_My_fAuLt_mY_BoSs_rEaCtEd_tHaT_WaY_AcTuAlLy])"	2:11
15.	"Do I obey economic laws if I extract money by offering my body for sale, by surrendering it to another’s lust?"	0:11
16.	"We Shall Overcome ([fury] w [dysmorphia] [tortures] to [improve] @ [the 24-hour fitness centre]) ([tRyInG_To_bE_MoRe_lIkE_My_bOsS] [identity#01])"	1:22
17.	"Examine the hideous machineries that produce the world-as-appearance. What did they see there? Only what all depressives, all mystics, always see[...]"	1:15
18.	"the obscene undead twitching of the Will as it seeks to maintain the illusion that this object, the one it is fixated upon NOW, this one, will satisfy it in a way that all other objects thus far have failed to."	0:50
19.	"A Horse with No Name ([headless horseman] w [bipolar depression] [racketeers] to [advance] @ [the property law firm]) ([tAkInG_ThInGs_wItH_My_bOsS_To_tHe_nExT_LeVeL])"	2:06
20.	"folx puts themself at the service of the other's most depraved fancies, plays the pimp between them and their need, excites in them morbid appetites, lies in wait for each of their weaknesses –"	0:03
21.	"all so that they can then demand the cash for this service of love."	0:05
22.	"Big Rock Candy Mountain ([unicorn] w [amnesia] [misspends ubi] to [self-care] @ [the mid-century suburb]) ([hOuSeWiFe_fAnTaSy] [daydream#01])"	1:37
23.	"There is no horizon."	0:03
24.	"The bald hillzones facing the spectator only form a line that merges with the void hanging over them."	0:02
25.	"Anyone can see that this man and this woman are no longer alive."	0:02
26.	"There is no pessimism here either."	0:02
27.	"What had to happen happened."	0:48
28.	"They did not kill each other."	0:04
29.	"[...] every person speculates on creating a new need in another, so as to drive folx to fresh sacrifice,"	0:39
30.	"to place them in a new dependence and to seduce them into a new mode of enjoyment and therefore economic ruin."	0:03
31.	"Solidarity Forever ([zombie] w [obsessive-compulsive disorder] [conspires] to [bond] @ [the military fortification]) ([i_nEeD_My_bOsS_AnD_He_nEeDs_mE])"	2:00
32.	"Capital is an abstract parasite, an insatiable vampire and zombie-maker; but the living flesh it converts into dead labo[u]r is ours, and the zombies it makes are us."	0:05
33.	"I Walk the Line ([oracle] w [hypochondria] [obstructs justice] to [comply] @ [the forensic laboratory]) ([fOlLoWiNg_mY_BoSsEs_iNsTrUcTiOnS_PrEcIsElY_BeCaUsE])"	2:25
34.	"Thus every factor, which works against a repetition of the old crises, carries within itself the germ of a far more powerful future crisis."	0:11
35.	"Angel from Montgomery ([devil] w [discouraged borderline personality disorder] [extorts] to [negotiate] @ [the sympathy strike]) ([iM_NoT_ArGuInG_WiTh_mY_BoSs_iM_StArTiNg_aN_OpEn_dIaLoGuE])"	2:08
36.	"The double bind, [...] "[...] the simultaneous transmission of two kinds of messages, one of which contradicts the other, [...]""	0:02
37.	"The contradictory instructions serve to destabilise the folx, keeping them in a state of permanent neurotic anxiety."	0:25
38.	"The Sound(s) of Silence ([manticore] w [social anxiety] [stalks] to [supervise] @ [the processing plant]) ([lEtTiNg_gO_Of_fRiEnDs_wHo_cAnT_AcCePt_tHaT_Im_hApPy_dAtInG_My_bOsS])"	2:12
39.	"[...] in all spheres of social life the lion's share falls to the middleman. [...]"	0:03
40.	"in religion, God is pushed into the background by the "Mediator," and the latter again is shoved back by the priests, the inevitable middlemen between the good shepherd and his sheep."	0:02
41.	"Hang Me, Oh Hang Me ([golem] w [dysmorphia] [attempts suicide] to [influence] @ [the vintage clothing store]) ([eLiMiNaTiNg_tHe_pArTs_oF_MySeLf_tHaT_ArEnT_CoNtRiBuTiNg_tO_SuCcEsS] [identity#02])"	2:20
42.	"They were unwitting necromancers who had stumbled on a formula for channeling voices, apprentices who had lost their sorcerer, as mindless golems animated by folx's vision(s)."	0:02
43.	"(Thus, when folx died, they said that they felt they had lost their eyes...)"	0:04
44.	"Hallelujah ([friends& original not a cover]) ([i_hOpE_EvErYoNe_lIsTeNiNg_iS_EnJoYiNg_tHe_mEtApHoR_AnD_ThE_CoNcEpT_AlBuM_!!] [if rym mods don't respect case sensitivity when cataloguing this album i will kms])"	2:02
45.	"The worker therefore only feels themself outside their work, and in their work feels outside themself."	0:21
46.	"folx feels at home when they are not working,"	0:55
47.	"and when they are working folx does not feel at home. [...]"	0:34
48.	"Its alien character emerges clearly in the fact that as soon as no physical or other compulsion exists, labor is shunned like the plague."	0:36
49.	"Carolina in My Mind ([skinwalker] w [alienation] [neglects] to [process] @ [the insurance claim centre]) ([aCtUaLlY_I_DoNt_eVeN_CaRe_aBoUt_wHaT_He_dOeS])"	2:00
50.	"Encounters with angels are as disturbing, traumatic and overwhelming as encounters with demons."	0:03
51.	"After all, what could be more shattering, unassimilable and incomprehensible in our hyper-stressed, constantly disappointing and overstimulated lives, than the sensation of calm joy?"	0:02
52.	"Return of the Grievous Angel ([devil] w [separation anxiety] [flees] to [reflect] @ [the silent retreat]) ([i_dOnT_LiKe_tAkInG_A_BrEaK_FrOm_hIm])"	1:46
53.	"All that is solid melts into air, all that is holy is profaned, and folx is at last compelled to face with sober senses their real conditions of life, and their relations with their kind."	0:10
54.	"Four Strong Winds ([witch] w [marijuana addiction] [loiters] to [serve] @ [his secret apartment]) ([hEs_sIcK_AnD_He_nEeDs_hElP_WhAt_aM_I_SuPpOsEd_tO_Do])"	1:52
55.	"Giving them potions, attaching horns to their body for drawing up the incisor, making the drums beat, the folx proceeds with a ceremony interrupted by halts and fresh departures, flows of all sorts, flows of words and breaks [...]"	0:03
56.	"the members of the village come to talk, the sick subject talks, the ghost is invoked, folx explains, everything recommences, drums, chants, trances."	0:48
57.	"At the top of the tower, there is no liberation from work. There is just more work — the only difference is that you might now enjoy it (life is too exciting for sleep)."	0:40
58.	"For these CEOs, work is closer to an addiction than something they are forced to do."	0:01
59.	"There are now two classes[...] those addicted to work, and those forced to work."	0:02
60.	"Goodnight Irene ([sandman] w [sociopathy] [misrepresents] to [leverage] @ [the asset management department]) ([i_cAn_bE_JuSt_lIkE_HiM])"	2:16
61.	"folx make their own history, but they do not make it as they please; they do not make it under self-selected circumstances, but under circumstances existing already, given and transmitted from the past."	0:02
62.	"The tradition of all dead generations weighs like a nightmare on the brains of the living."	0:02
63.	"Desolation Row ([spectre] w [autism] [trespasses] to [safeguard] @ [the housing complex]) ([iN_ChArGe_!!_LiKe_a_bOsS_!!] [property ownership is the only remaining job] [LANDLORD ANTHEM])"	1:42
64.	"– "to give the listener the pay-off, the sanic money-shot, as soon and as obviously as possible." [...] there's a tyrannical desperation about this [album]. It doesn't seduce; it tyrannises."	0:06
65.	"Blues Run the Game ([sonic] w [dysmorphia] [violates copyright] to [restart] @ [the city upon a hillzone]) ([wAiT_Am_i_oLd_nOw_??] [identity#03])"	1:48
66.	"This is no longer the cruelty of life, the terror of one life brought to bear against another life, but a post-mortem despotism, the despot become anus and vampire[...]"	0:04
67.	""Capital is dead labour, that vampire-like, only lives by sucking living labour, and lives the more, the more labour it sucks.""	0:03
68.	"Streets of London ([vampire] w [hyper-empathy] [coerces] to [mentor] @ [the community development]) ([gIvInG_My_iNtErN_EvErYtHiNg_sHe_wIlL_NeEd_tO_SuCcEeD])"	1:51
69.	"Vampires do not appear in mirrors. In the case of grey vampires — [...] — this means both that they cannot recognise themselves as vampires and that their existence is entirely dependent upon the attention of the Other."	0:12
70.	"If I Needed You ([siren] w [petulant borderline personality disorder] [blackmails] to [motivate] @ [the benefit concert]) ([mY_InTeRn_nEeDs_mE_AnD_I_NeEd_hEr])"	1:56
71.	"[...] a society that has conjured up such gigantic means of production and of exchange, is like the sorcerer"	0:22
72.	"who is no longer able to control the powers of the nether world whom folx has called up by their spells."	1:10
73.	"Leaving on a Jetplane ([fate] w [complex post-traumatic stress disorder] [corrupts] to [uphold] @ [the trauma centre]) ([fUcK_KiDs_tHeSe_dAyS_ArE_UnGrAtEfUl])"	2:27
74.	"The re-staging of the death is less an admission of ethical responsibility than an attempt to own it, to make sense of it. Such is the logic of trauma."	0:03
75.	"The Last Thing on My Mind ([ouroboros] w [secondary post-traumatic stress disorder] [perjures] to [reorient] @ [the experimental psychiatric clinic]) ([mAn_i_ReGrEt_wHaT_I_DiD_To_tHaT_KiD] [her accusations are true but im not goin])"	1:41
76.	"Self-contempt is a serpent that ever gnaws at folx's breast, sucking the life-blood from folx's own heart and mixing it with the poison of misanthropy and despair."	1:10
77.	"Don't Think Twice, It's All Right ([hydra] w [narcissistic personality disorder] [betrays] to [satisfy] @ [the restorative justice zone]) ([gOnNa_mAkE_It_wOrK_WiTh_hEr_!!])"	2:12
78.	"Semio-capitalism is more like confronting the mythical hydra[...] cut off one head and three more grow in its place, [...]"	0:02
79.	"The good old days of exploitation, [...] meant the annihilation of subjectivity, your reduction to an impersonal machine-part; [...] Now, there is no time away from work, and work is not opposed to subjectivity."	0:04
80.	"Moonshadow ([horseman of the apocalypse] w [gambling addiction] [misappropriates] to [restructure] @ [the private equity firm]) ([aCtUaLlY_GoNnA_MaKe_iT_WoRk_wItH_HiM_!!])"	1:49
81.	"The death model appears when the body without organs repels the organs and lays them aside[...] no mouth,"	1:55
82.	"no tongue, no teeth—to the point of self-mutilation, to the point of suicide."	0:02
83.	"[...] the belief in progress and the faith that one could describe new times in new terms wanes,"	0:03
84.	"to be replaced by “the imitation of dead styles, speech through all the masks and voices stored up in the imaginary museums of a new global culture”."	0:31
85.	"Playing in the Band ([doppelganger] w [repetitive strain injury] [impersonates] to [entertain] @ [the tribute artist music festival]) ([sInGlE_LiFe_fAnTaSy] [daydream#02])"	2:33
86.	"So far as living instruments of labour are concerned, for instance horses, their reproduction is timed by nature itself. Their average lifetime as instruments of labour is determined by laws of nature."	0:02
87.	"As soon as this term has expired they must be replaced by new ones. A horse cannot be replaced piecemeal; it must be replaced by another horse."	0:05
88.	"Both Sides Now ([grim reaper] w [self-destructive borderline personality disorder] [manslaughters] to [pivot] @ [the third space]) ([hEs_bReAkInG_Up_wItH_Me_fOr_gOoD_AnD_Im_wOrRiEd_tHe_mEtApHoR_Is_gRoWiNg_iNcOhErEnT])"	1:41
89.	"(And you think, well, it’s not the sort of thing that you’d forget, killing yourself and your children, is it? But of course, it’s not the sort of thing that you could possibly remember."	0:18
90.	"It is an exemplary case of that which must be repressed, the traumatic Real.)"	0:10
91.	"The Circle Game ([brony] w [chronic pain] [defrauds] to [live] @ [the social services hub]) ([hEs_gOnNa_mAkE_Me_bEg] [identity#04])"	1:57
92.	"folx returns to a cave dwelling, which is now, however, contaminated with the pestilential breath of civilisation, and which they continue to occupy only precariously,"	0:02
93.	"it being for them an alien habitation which can be withdrawn from them any day – a place from which, if they do not pay, they can be thrown out any day. For this mortuary folx has to pay."	0:03
94.	"Take Me Home, Country Roads ([minotaur] w [schizophrenia] [surrenders] to [recover] @ [the family farm]) ([lIvInG_WiTh_mY_DaD_AgAiN])"	2:13
95.	"Fragments of tunes providing minimal orientation in a labyrinth of abstract sound. Have you heard this before? You can never be sure."	0:36
96.	"This Land Is Your Land ([hobgoblin] w [stockholm syndrome] [loiters] to [serve] @ [his estate]) ([uNcOnDiTiOnAlLy_sUbMiTtInG_To_hIm_cOmPlEtElY])"	1:36
97.	"[...] no eunuch flatters their despot more basely or uses more despicable means to stimulate their dulled capacity for pleasure in order to sneak a favour for themself than does the industrial eunuch – the music producer"	0:05
98.	"– in order to sneak for themself a few pieces of silver, in order to charm the golden birds, out of the pockets of their dearly beloved folx."	0:12
99.	"Blowin' in the Wind ([friends& original not a cover]) ([iT’S_A_CoNcEpT_AlBuM_OkAy_!!_I’M_DoInG_My_bEsT_!!])"	2:33
100.	"The one who is possessed is also dispossessed – of their own identity and voice."	0:18
101.	"But this kind of dispossession is of course a precondition for the most potent writing and performance."	1:15
102.	"Writers have to tune into other voices[...] performers must be capable of being taken over by outside forces –"	0:02
103.	"Rocky Mountain High ([phoenix] w [no pathology] [inherits] to [enlighten] @ [your estate]) ([dAdDyDaDdYdAdDyDaDdY_!!])"	2:10
104.	"[...] in such epochs of revolutionary crisis folx anxiously conjure up the spirits of the past to their service,"	0:11
105.	"borrowing from them names, battle slogans, and costumes in order to present this new scene in world history in time-honoured disguise and borrowed language."	0:02
106.	"Can the Circle Be Unbroken (By and By) ([valkyrie] w [no pathology] [retires] to [release] [the song]) ([fOrCiNg_tHe_dEaD_InTo_tHe_sOnG_WhEtHeR_ThEy_lIkE_It_oR_NoT])"	2:28
107.	"These "luminous new landscapes" were worlds beyond work, where drudgery's dreary repetitiveness gave way to drifting explorations of strange terrains."	0:04
108.	"Listened to now, these tracks describe the very conditions necessary for their own production, which is to say, access to a certain mode of time, time which allows a deep absorption."	0:03
109.	"Old Man ([satyr] w [object schizophrenia] [volunteers] to [dance] @ [his private care home]) ([mUsIc_iS_My_hObBy_oR_SoMeThInG])"	1:16
110.	"Dear friend, I give you what you need, but you know the necessary condition; you know the ink in which you have to sign yourself over to me; in providing for your pleasure, I fleece you.)"	0:02
111.	"— nothing new here, the old man gamely and tirelessly going over his favourite riffs, once again —"	0:04
112.	"Does this story have an ending? Can an analysis be ended, can the process of analysis be terminated, yes or no? Can it be completed, or is folx condemned to a constant self-perpetuation?"	0:02
Total length:		92:55

=== Notable samples and interpolations ===
- "Man of Constant Sorrow ([android] w [autism] [phishes] to [network] @ [the city upon a hill]) ([bOyFrIeNd_qUeSt_bEgInS])" – "Sleepless in Ponyville"; O Brother, Where Art Thou?
- "Hang Me, Oh Hang Me ([golem] w [dysmorphia] [attempts suicide] to [influence] @ [the vintage clothing store]) ([eLiMiNaTiNg_tHe_pArTs_oF_MySeLf_tHaT_ArEnT_CoNtRiBuTiNg_tO_SuCcEsS] [identity#02])" – "Ponyboy" by Sophie; "Ian Curtis Wishlist" by Xiu Xiu
- "Catch the Wind ([fairy] w [bipolar mania] [indecently exposes] to [impress] @ [the coworking space]) ([cAsUaLlY_DaTiNg_iN_SeArCh_oF_SoMeThInG_SeRiOuS])" – "My Sharona" by the Knack; "Sleepless in Ponyville" (Note: For a full list of sample and interpolation credits, see the album's Bandcamp page, where it is given as a list of "citations")

== Personnel ==
According to Bandcamp release; all additional performer names are deliberately provided mononymically.

=== Friends& ===
- BC Power
- CT Pond
- JC Grame
- JC Sims

=== Additional performers ===
- Paul – writer, performer
- Audie – vocals
- Brock – vocals
- Cam – vocals
- David – vocals
- Effy – vocals
- Ely – vocals, performer, arranger, additional producer
- Goldwag – vocals
- Katherine – vocals
- Kian – vocals
- Lavender – vocals
- Lea – vocals
- Lily – vocals
- Maddy – vocals
- Maebh – vocals
- Mason – vocals
- Matthew – vocals
- Micha – vocals
- Mills – vocals
- Montecanis – vocals
- Mp3 – vocals
- Octavia – vocals
- Owen – vocals
- River – vocals
- Shahzad – vocals
- Stan – vocals
- Todd – vocals
- Viv – vocals
- Whiskers – vocals

=== Production ===
- Aaron – performer, arranger, additional producer
- Daniel – performer, arranger, additional producer
- Derek – performer, arranger, additional producer
- Liam – performer, arranger, additional producer
- Nick – performer, arranger, additional producer
- Peter – performer, arranger, additional producer
- Steve – performer, arranger, additional producer

=== Art ===
- Katie – cover art

== See also ==
- Cute Accelerationism
- Fandom and technology
- Woody Guthrie
- Folktronic (2001)
