= Disenchanted Hearts Unite =

Studio album by Tullycraft
- Released: May 3, 2005
- Recorded: Soundhouse Studios, Seattle, WA
- Genre: Indie pop
- Length: 37:53
- Label: Magic Marker Records (US); Little Teddy (Germany)
- Producer: Kip Beelman

Tullycraft chronology
Beat Surf Fun (2002)	Disenchanted Hearts Unite (2005)	Every Scene Needs a Center (2007)

Professional ratings
Review scores
Source	Rating
AllMusic	4.5/5 stars

Disenchanted Hearts Unite is the fourth studio album from the indiepop band Tullycraft. The band recorded half of the album at Soundhouse Studios in Seattle, and the other half in guitarist, Chris Munford's living room. Jenny Mears provided additional vocals on many of the songs, and Corianton Hale also made a guest appearance. Shortly after the recording of the Disenchanted Hearts Unite, lead guitarist, Harold Hollingsworth left the group and both Mears & Hale joined the band. Jen Abercrombie from the Los Angeles band Rizzo, who had contributed vocals to the City of Subarus album, appeared on the songs “Fall 4 U” and “Building The Robot.” The album reached #33 on the CMJ Top 200 chart in 2005. At the end of 2009, Disenchanted Hearts Unite appeared on a number of 'Best Albums of the Decade' lists.

== Track listing ==
1. "Stowaway"
2. "Our Days in Kansas"
3. "Every Little Thing"
4. "Leaders of the New School"
5. "The Last Song"
6. "Molly's Got a Crush on Us" (live)
7. "Polaroids from Mars"
8. "Rumble with the Gang Debs"
9. "Fall 4 U"
10. "Girl About Town"
11. "Building the Robot"
12. "Secretly Minnesotan"

== Personnel ==
Tullycraft

- Sean Tollefson – vocals, bass, keyboard
- Jeff Fell – drums
- Chris Munford – guitar, keyboard, backing vocals
- Jenny Mears – vocals, backing vocals
- Harold Hollingsworth – lead guitar
- Corianton Hale – backing vocals

Additional

- Kip Beelman & Chris Munford – recording, audio engineering
- Taryn Webber – cello on "Fall 4 U" and "Polaroids From Mars"
- Jen Abercrombie – vocals on "Fall 4 U" and "Building The Robot"
- Roshan Gurusinghe - recording assistant

== Artwork ==
- Corianton Hale received a regional design award from Print Magazine for the design and layout of the Disenchanted Hearts Unite album.
- The Disenchanted Hearts Unite album was featured in the book FOR SALE - Over 200 Innovative Solutions In Packaging Design (2008) by John Foster

== Trivia ==
- The song "Molly's Got A Crush On Us" is based on the BMX Bandits song “Kylie's Got A Crush On Us”.
- "Girl About Town" is a Helen Love cover.

== Bibliography ==
- Strong, M. C. (2003). The Great Indie Discography (2nd Edition) pg. 1041. Published by Canon Books Ltd. (US/CAN) ISBN 1-84195-335-0.
- Foster, John (2008). FOR SALE - Over 200 Innovative Solutions In Packaging Design pg. 21. Published by HOW Books ISBN 978-1-60061-063-9
