= Math and Physics Club (album) =

Studio album by Math and Physics Club
- Released: October 16, 2006
- Genre: Indie rock, twee pop
- Length: 28:30
- Label: Matinée

Math and Physics Club chronology
| Movie Ending Romance (EP) (2005) | Math and Physics Club (2006) | Baby I'm Yours (EP) (2007) |

Professional ratings
Review scores
| Source | Rating |
|---|---|
| AllMusic | link |
| Pitchfork | (7.2/10) link |

Math and Physics Club is the self-titled debut album by Seattle indie rock band Math and Physics Club. The album was recorded over two days in early June 2006 at Seattle's Avast! Recording. Kevin Suggs, known for his work with Cat Power and The Walkabouts, as well as for engineering live sessions for KEXP, engineered and co-produced the sessions.

The album was released to favorable reviews in October 2006. Marc Hogan, writing for Pitchfork, declared that the album's "brazenly sweet songs of quiet heartbreak" ... "should get some warm looks from a new generation of tender-hearted, bookish music listeners." PopMatters declared Math and Physics Club the best indie pop album of 2006, with Dave Heaton writing that "the melodies are catchy but in a lasting, not disposable way; the lyrics are articulate, smart expressions of feelings (hope, heartbreak, sadness, wonder); the songs are played and arranged with such bare-bones grace that they begin to resemble Zen expressions of pop music's essence."

The band would continue working with Kevin Suggs at Avast! for their next EP, Baby I'm Yours, released the following year.

== Track listing ==
1. "Darling, Please Come Home" – 3:13
2. "I Know What I Want" – 2:21
3. "April Showers" – 2:32
4. "Holidays and Saturdays" – 2:58
5. "La La La Lisa" – 2:50
6. "Look at Us Now" – 2:53
7. "You'll Miss Me" – 3:15
8. "Cold as Minnesota" – 3:09
9. "Such a Simple Plan" – 2:46
10. "Last Dance" – 2:37
