= Baby I'm Yours =

Baby I'm Yours may refer to:

- "Baby I'm Yours" (Barbara Lewis song), 1965
- "Baby I'm Yours" (Steve Wariner song), 1988
- "Baby I'm Yours" (Breakbot song), 2012
- "Baby I'm Yours", a song on the 1992 Shai album ...If I Ever Fall in Love
- Baby I'm Yours (EP), a 2007 EP by Math and Physics Club
- Baby I'm Yours (album), a 1992 album by Maureen McGovern
