= Barcelona (band) =

American indie rock/pop band from Arlington, Virginia

- Origin: Arlington, Virginia, U.S.
- Genres: Indie rock, pop, new wave
- Years active: 1998–2001
- Label: March Records
- Past members: Jason Korzen, Jennifer Carr, Ivan Ramiscal, Christian Scanniello

Barcelona was an indie rock, pop, and new wave band from Arlington, Virginia and Washington, D.C. Metropolitan area, consisting of Jason Korzen, Jennifer Carr, Ivan Ramiscal, and Christian Scanniello. The band addresses geeky themes in many of their songs, such as "The Downside of Computer Camp", "I Have the Password to Your Shell Account", and "Paging System Operator", about a boy who contacts someone in Sweden whom he believes to be an experienced cracker, using a BBS, only to find he is also a thirteen-year-old.

== History ==
=== 1998: Formation ===
Barcelona was formed in 1998 by Korzen and Carr. The pair recruited Ramiscal and Scanniello and began writing and performing original songs that year. Later that year, the group met producer/engineer Trevor Kampmann (also known as Trevor Holland) and began work on its first LP, Simon Basic, which included the single "Why Do You Have So Much Fun Without Me?".

=== 1999: Simon Basic ===
The band signed to March Records in early 1999 and released Simon Basic in June 1999. The album takes its name from the Simons' BASIC programming language, developed for the Commodore 64. In the fall of 1999, it embarked on its first tour, mainly on the East Coast, but also including Chicago.

=== 2000: Zero One Infinity ===
In 2000, the band began work on Zero One Infinity, again with producer Kampmann. The album includes "I Have the Password to Your Shell Account" (which received some circulation on the Internet), "Studio Hair Gel", "Robot Trouble" and "Kasey Keller", an ode to the American soccer player. "Studio Hair Gel" and "Robot Trouble" were both released as singles prior to the album and included remixes by Figurine, Dntel and Baxendale. The band toured again in the fall of 2000 on ZOI, including a live performance at the University of Maryland's WMUC. The album was also well received by many music publications such as Pitchfork. The band would also record many other their performances in Gainesville, Florida, Lexington, Kentucky, and Wesleyan University in Connecticut.

=== 2001: Transhuman Revolution and breakup ===
The group would play at many locations and cities in the US with The Lucksmiths, Kleenex Girl Wonder, Pocket Rockets, among other groups throughout the year such as Washington, D.C., New York City, Philadelphia, and Jacksonville. The groups popularity was also boosted by exposure from English DJ and radio presenter John Peel, with Peel playing tracks from the band's second album, Zero One Infinity, on his shows in early 2001, with the album receiving a best album nomination in January and February 2001, and the group playing at the YoYo-a-Gogo festival in Olympia, Washington, with gigs being planned in Washington and other West Coast states such as Oregon and California, and playing at HFStival in Washington, D.C..

Barcelona would record Transhuman Revolution in 2001 again with Kampmann before, during, and after touring, with the album being announced for release on CD and vinyl, with Cameron Crowe responsible for sequencing the vinyl edition; however, the vinyl version was never released, despite this, Darla has credited him for CD sequencing he did not undertake.

As a result of Crowe’s discovery of the group, their name was referenced in his 2001 film Vanilla Sky alongside Looper and Radiohead. However, unlike the latter two, their music was not featured in the film, though their music may have appeared on mix CDs played on set.

The album would be released in late 2001, with tracks such as "Everything Makes Me Think about Sex" and "Human Simulation". Shortly after the album's release, the band announced a breakup and would play their final show at The Metro Cafe in Washington, D.C., in February 2002.

=== Post-Barcelona ===
Members of the group would make solo projects post-breakup, with Korzen forming Sprites with his wife, Amy Korzen, with both Scanniello and Ramiscal have contributed to the project, and Ramiscal forming The Positions.

The groups albums would be released on streaming platforms in 2015, with expanded editions being released the same year by Darla.

== Members ==
- Jason Korzen - Lead and Backing Vocals, Guitar
- Jennifer Carr - Bass, Backing and Co-Lead Vocals
- Ivan Ramiscal - Keyboards, Guitar
- Christian Scanniello - Drums

== Discography ==
=== Albums ===
- Simon Basic (1999)
- Zero One Infinity (2000)
- Transhuman Revolution (2001)

== See also ==
- Barcelona, Seattle band formed in 2005
- A Flock of Seagulls, English new wave and synth-pop band
