= City of Subarus =

Studio album by Tullycraft
- Released: 1998
- Recorded: home-recorded, Seattle, WA
- Genre: Indie pop
- Length: 33:16
- Label: Cher Doll Records (CHER 011)
- Producer: none

Tullycraft chronology
Old Traditions, New Standards (1996)	City of Subarus (1998)	The Singles (2000)

Professional ratings
Review scores
Source	Rating
Allmusic	3/5 stars

City of Subarus is the second album from the indie pop band Tullycraft. Chris Munford from the band Incredible Force of Junior joined Tullycraft prior to the recording of this album, making the three piece a foursome. On this sophomore release, Tullycraft introduced electronic beats and a punk-ish sound contrasting with their debut Old Traditions, New Standards. The entire record was self-recorded using an Otari MX5050 8-track analog tape machine at a house rented by Munford and drummer Jeff Fell. The house was located across the street from a Subaru dealership, inspiring the album's title. Jen Abercrombie from the Los Angeles band Rizzo provided additional vocals on many of the songs.

== Track listing ==
1. "8 Great Ways"
2. "Belinda"
3. "Ticket Tonight"
4. "Crush This Town"
5. "Godspeed"
6. "Miss Douglas County"
7. "Actives & Pledges"
8. "The Lives of Cleopatra"
9. "Bee Sting Stings"
10. "Vacation in Christine, ND"

== Personnel ==
- Sean Tollefson – vocals, bass
- Jeff Fell – drums, bass
- Gary Miklusek – lead guitar, keyboard
- Chris Munford – keyboard, guitar, backing vocals | recording, audio engineering
- Jen Abercrombie – vocals, backing vocals
