= Forever (Bassvictim album) =

Studio album by Bassvictim
- Released: October 10, 2025
- Recorded: September 2025
- Venue: Norway
- Studio: Betty Fjord Clinic
- Genre: Electronic
- Length: 33:05
- Languages: English, Polish
- Label: VOTB
- Producer: Ike Clateman

Bassvictim chronology
Basspunk 2 (2025)	Forever (2025)	? (2026)

Forever is the debut studio album by electronic music duo Bassvictim. It was released on October 10, 2025, through VOTB.

== Background and recording ==
Forever was recorded in two weeks in the Betty Fjord Clinic, located in Norway, a month before its release.

== Critical reception ==
Pitchfork's music critic Archie Forde rated Forever a 7.5/10, writing "with slyly artful pop instincts, the experimental London duo throws a raging 2010s-themed party". Subsequently, Pitchfork placed the album at the 49th spot on their list of 50 Best Albums of 2025. The album's fifth track, "Dog Tag freestyle", would place 34 on Pitchfork's 40 Best Rap Songs of 2025 list.

== Track listing ==
All tracks written by Maria Manow, Ike Clateman and produced by Ike Clateman, unless noted otherwise.

No.	Title	Writer(s)	Producer(s)	Length
1.	"It's Me Maria"		Ike Clateman, Mathias Humen	2:08
2.	"27a Pitfield St"		Ike Clateman, Mathias Humen	2:47
3.	"Grow Up!!!"			1:39
4.	"Lil Maria"	Ike Clateman, Maria Manow, Mathias Humien		2:44
5.	"Dog Tag Freestyle"			2:44
6.	"Grass is Greener"		Ike Clateman, Mathias Humen	4:23
7.	"I'm Sorry, King"			2:58
8.	"Wolves Howling"		Ike Clateman, Mathias Humen	3:25
9.	"Ike Piano"	Carl August Amble Eriksen, Ike Clateman, Maria Manow		3:14
10.	"Mr. President"			3:37
11.	"Final Song"		Ike Clateman, Mathias Humen	3:37
Total length:				33:05

== Personnel ==
Credits for Forever adapted from Tidal.

- Ike Clateman — producer, masterer, mixer, engineer
- Maria Manow — vocals, cello (tracks 6, 9, 10)
- Mathias Humen — co-producer (tracks 1, 2, 6, 8, 11)
- Carl August Amble Eriksen — guitar (track 9)
