= Sprites (band) =

American new wave and indie pop band

- Origin: United States
- Genres: New wave, indie pop
- Years active: 2002–present
- Label: Darla/March
- Members: Jason Korzen, Amy Korzen

Sprites are an independent new wave/indie pop music group from Maryland, United States. Their lineup is ever-changing, with only the founding members (the husband-wife duo of Jason Korzen, formerly of Barcelona, and Amy Korzen) staying constant. Contributors include Christian Scanniello, Ivan Ramiscal, Kevin Alvir, Armin Pruessner, Derek Strausbaugh, and Reid Dossinger.

== History ==
=== 2002 to 2006: Starling, Spiders, Tiger and Sprites ===
Sprites was formed in 2002 by Jason Korzen following the breakup of Barcelona. The band released the album Starling, Spiders, Tiger and Sprites in 2003 on March Records. It contains a cover of the song "It Changes" from the film Snoopy Come Home. They have done some touring, including a United States tour with The Lucksmiths.

=== 2006: Modern Gameplay ===
Sprites' second album, Modern Gameplay, was released in August 2006 through Darla Records.

== Discography ==
=== Albums and EPs ===
- Starling, Spiders, Tiger and Sprites, 2003, March Records
- Bionic Hands e.p., 2004, Lejos Discos
- Modern Gameplay, 2006, Darla Records

=== Featured on ===
- Little Darla Has a Treat for You vol. 19, 2002 ("Following Her Around")
- Teenbeat Sampler, 2003 ("Keep it Together")
- Little Darla Has a Treat for You vol. 24, 2006 ("George Romero")
- Little Darla Has a Treat for You vol. 25, 2006 ("Pac-Man Fever")
- Wish I'd Kept a Scrapbook: A Tribute to Tullycraft, 2010 ("Wish I’d Kept a Scrapbook")
