= Lost in Light Rotation =

Studio album by Tullycraft
- Released: April 2013
- Recorded: Dubtrain Studio, Seattle, WA; Avast Recording Co., Seattle, WA
- Genre: Indie pop
- Length: 32:30
- Label: Magic Marker (MMR 067); Fortuna Pop! (FPOP144)

Tullycraft chronology
Every Scene Needs a Center (2007)	Lost in Light Rotation (2013)	The Railway Prince Hotel (2019)

Professional ratings
Review scores
Source	Rating
AllMusic	4/5 stars

Lost in Light Rotation is the sixth studio album from indie pop band Tullycraft. After a three-year hiatus, the album was the band's first since Every Scene Needs a Center in 2007.

All five band members (Tollefson, Fell, Munford, Mears and Hale) reunited for the album, and the band began the recording process during the summer of 2012. Tracking began with engineer Pete Remine at Dubtrain studio in Seattle. Producer Phil Ek, whose credits include The Shins' Chutes Too Narrow, Band Of Horses' Everything All the Time and five Built to Spill albums, was recruited to mix the record. Ek's influence was apparent as the album had a slightly more polished, less lo-fi sound than past releases.

The album was co-released on April 23, 2013, by Magic Marker Records in the US and Fortuna Pop! in the UK.

== Track listing ==
All tracks by Tullycraft .

1. "Agincourt"
2. "Queenie Co."
3. "Lost in Light Rotation"
4. "Westchester Turnabouts"
5. "From Wichita with Love"
6. "Elks Lodge Riot"
7. "No Tic, All Tac"
8. "Dig Up the Graves"
9. "Wake Up, Wake Up"
10. "We Knew Your Name Until Your Heart Stopped"
11. "Anacortes"

== Single ==
The title track, "Lost in Light Rotation", was released as a 7" single in the UK on Fortuna Pop!.

== Videos ==
Videos were released for the songs "Lost in Light Rotation" and "Dig Up the Graves".

== Other formats ==
A limited edition cassette version of the album was released on Fika Recordings in the UK.

== Personnel ==
- Sean Tollefson – vocals
- Jeff Fell – drums
- Chris Munford – guitar, bass, keyboard, vocals
- Jenny Mears – vocals
- Corianton Hale – guitar, organ, tambourine, ukulele, vocals

== Additional personnel ==
- Evan Mosher – trumpet
- Mark McKenzie – bass
- Pete Remine – cabaza
