= Math and Physics Club =

- Origin: Seattle, Washington, United States
- Genres: Indie pop, twee pop
- Years active: 2004-present
- Labels: Matinee, Tragadiscos
- Members: Charles Bert; Ethan Jones
- Past members: James Werle; Kevin Emerson; Saundrah Humphrey; Andrew Blakehall
- Website: www.mathandphysicsclub.com

Math and Physics Club are an American indie pop band based in Seattle, Washington, United States. Its members are Charles Bert (vocals, rhythm guitar) and Ethan Jones (bass, keyboards). James Werle played lead guitar until he died in 2018. Kevin Emerson (drums) continues to play on recordings though no longer a full time member of the band. The band has released three EPs and four full-length albums on Santa Barbara-based Matinee Recordings, with UK distribution on Fika Recordings. They are often associated with Australian labelmates The Lucksmiths and twee pop band Tullycraft, and Pitchfork Media described their work as "music to hold hands to" after The Lucksmiths' song on the album "Why That Doesn't Surprise Me".

== Biography ==
Math and Physics Club began as a basement project for longtime friends Charles Bert (vocals) and James Werle (guitar). Their first release was a digital-only single on Comfort Stand Recordings which featured an early version of the song "Graduation Day", along with a b-side titled "Everybody Lies". Both songs featured keyboards by early collaborator Andrew Hall, according to the Comfort Stand web site, and who is also credited with playing keyboards on two songs on their first EP, and is credited as a co-writer with the band on the song "Nothing Really Happened" on their third EP. By mid-2004, the band's lineup featured Kevin Emerson on drums, Saundrah Humphrey on violin, and Ethan Jones on bass. The band's initial demo attracted the attention of both Jimmy Tassos of Matinee Recordings and the influential KEXP DJ John Richards. As they played their third show in December, they were already receiving considerable attention, including frequent spins on KEXP.

The four-song EP Weekends Away was released in February 2005 and received heavy radio play on stations such as KEXP and WOXY, picking up several reviews from the indiepop press. By late spring the band finally had a handful of shows under its belt, including a few West Coast stops with new labelmates The Lucksmiths, and an appearance at the annual Sasquatch! Music Festival (headlined by the Pixies). The Movie Ending Romance EP was released in July 2005 to further reviews and growing live audiences. The audience at the San Francisco Pop Festival saw them perform 'A is for Alphabet' with Razorcuts leader Gregory Webster on vocals.

In September 2005, the band enjoyed playing to a packed crowd at Seattle’s Bumbershoot music festival. Shortly afterward, the band began recording their debut LP Math and Physics Club which was released a year later in October 2006, meriting a favorable review from Pitchfork Media and named "Best Indie Pop Album of 2006" by PopMatters. The band's third EP Baby I'm Yours was unveiled on October 1, 2007 with a short tour through southern California. Saundrah left the band in late 2007, and drummer Kevin Emerson left the band officially shortly thereafter, although he has continued to drum on their recordings. In the summer of 2009, they began recording their second full-length album at Jupiter Studios in Seattle with producer Martin Feveyear (Mark Lanegan, Presidents of the USA), which emerged in June 2010 as I Shouldn't Look As Good As I Do. Bassist Ethan Jones toured with indie-rock three-piece Eux Autres briefly between 2010 and early 2011, playing shows supporting Wild Flag on the West Coast of the US, and touring the UK, France and Italy.

In the Summer of 2011, Math and Physics Club toured the UK for the first time, with stops in Glasgow, Manchester, London, Nottingham and at the Derby-based Indietracks festival. In August 2012, they began recording their third LP in at K Records' Dub Narcotic Studio, with Bob Schwenkler engineering. On January 23, Matinee Recordings announced on their Facebook page that this material would be released in 2013 as Our Hearts Beat Out Loud. The group's fourth album, Lived Here Before, was released on January 26, 2018.

Bert and Werle were both raised in Olympia, Washington, home of K Records and Kill Rock Stars, and they soaked up a thriving indie music scene. Before convening Math and Physics Club they were in a band called Drive Car Girl (named after a Beat Happening song). They played about a dozen shows at local clubs and coffee houses with a set of 12-15 original songs, along with covers of songs by REM, Nancy Sinatra and Kraftwerk. Former members of Drive Car Girl include Brent Cole Whats Up Magazine and Sean Berry Double Crown Records. Elsewhere, Ethan shared guitar chords with high school friend Carrie Brownstein and later, as a student at The Evergreen State College featured in Jenny Jenkins' musical "Love Is Stupid" opposite Mirah. Ethan also began the Internet's first Beach Boys related mailing list, called "surfsup", in January 1994.

James Werle died of cancer in September 2018.

== Influences ==
Math and Physics Club can be seen as musical descendants of C86 and Sarah Records although no formal connection exists. They are also influenced by The Softies, The Smiths, The Stone Roses, The Posies, Belle and Sebastian, Beat Happening, and The Lucksmiths.

== Discography ==
=== Albums ===
- Math and Physics Club, 2006 Matinee Recordings
- I Shouldn't Look as Good as I Do, 2010 Matinee Recordings
- Our Hearts Beat Out Loud, 2013 Matinee Recordings
- Lived Here Before, 2018 Matinee Recordings

=== EPs ===
- Weekends Away 2005 Matinee Recordings
- Movie Ending Romance 2005 Matinee Recordings
- Baby I'm Yours 2007, Matinee Recordings

=== Singles ===
- 7, with Acid House Kings, Sambassadeur, and Loveninjas, 2006 Tragadiscos
- Jimmy Had A Polaroid b/w Sound of Snow 2010 Matinee Recordings

=== Compilations ===
- Strength in Numbers, 2005
- Matinee Hit Parade, 2007 Matinee Recordings
- The Matinee Grand Prix, 2009 Matinee Recordings
- Wish I'd Kept a Scrapbook: A Tribute to Tullycraft, 2010 Unchikun Records
- The Matinee Holiday Soiree EP, 2010 Matinee Recordings
- In This Together, 2016 Matinee Recordings
