= Wish I'd Kept a Scrapbook: A Tribute to Tullycraft =

Wish I'd Kept A Scrapbook: A Tribute to Tullycraft

Compilation album
- Released: 2010
- Genre: Indie pop
- Label: Unchikun

Wish I'd Kept A Scrapbook: A Tribute to Tullycraft is a 2010 tribute album to the pioneering indiepop / twee band Tullycraft. The album, released on Unchikun Records, features cover versions of songs written by Tullycraft, performed by a number of artists including: Math and Physics Club, the Smittens, Bunnygrunt, Hot Lava, Darren Hanlon & Rose Melberg. The album was compiled by Lee Grutman from the band LA Tool & Die and was a labor of love for all of the bands involved.

== Track listing ==
No.	Title	Cover artist	Length
1.	"Pink Lemonade"	Hot Lava	1:48
2.	"Not Quite Burning Bridges"	Bunnygrunt	3:09
3.	"Josie"	Iji	2:22
4.	"Our Days In Kansas"	The Besties	2:41
5.	"Every Little Thing"	The Medusa Snare	2:53
6.	"Wild Bikini"	Hotpance Romance	2:30
7.	"Sweet"	The Smittens	3:04
8.	"Superboy & Supergirl"	Math and Physics Club	3:33
9.	"If You Take Away the Make Up Then the Vampires They Will Die"	LA Tool & Die	1:36
10.	"Rumble With The Gang Debs"	Fishboy	3:42
11.	"Look How We Killed The Riot Grrrls"	Folklore	2:43
12.	"Pop Songs Your New Boyfriend’s Too Stupid To Know About"	Galactic Heroes	2:39
13.	"Skyway"	Gold Bears	1:48
14.	"DIY Queen"	Master Track	3:28
15.	"Godspeed"	The Awesomelies	1:46
16.	"The Punks Are Writing Love Songs"	Moustache of Insanity	4:04
17.	"The Last Song"	Poison Control Center	3:17
18.	"Who Needs What"	Casper & the Cookies	5:09
19.	"Our Days In Kansas"	Darren Hanlon & Rose Melberg	3:01
20.	"Fall 4 U"	The Special Places	3:34
21.	"Wish I’d Kept a Scrapbook"	Sprites	3:47

== See also ==
Tullycraft
