= Subvert (music marketplace) =

Cooperatively-owned online music distribution platform

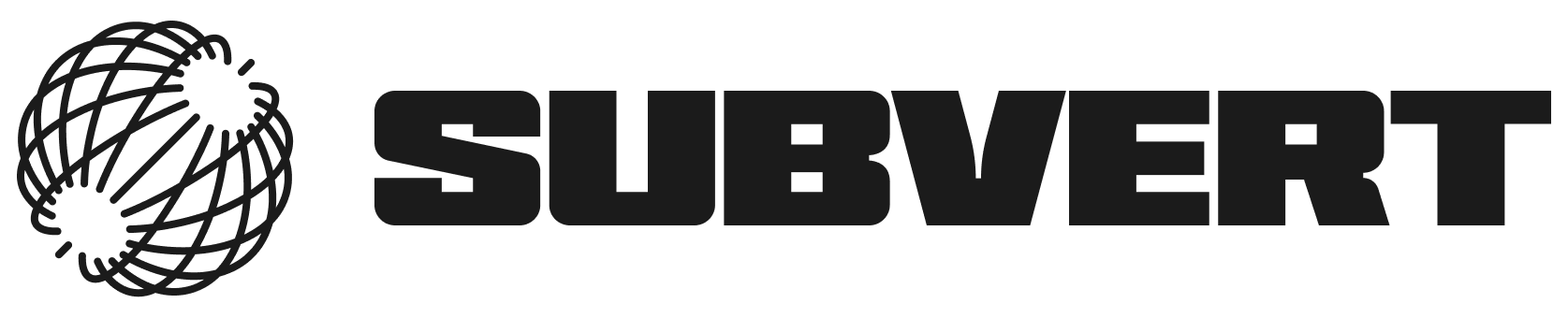
- Founder: Austin Robey
- Key people: Austin Robey (founder); Sean Adams (engineering lead); Freya Yamamoto (Board Chair)
- Website: subvert.fm
- Launched: May 12, 2026

Subvert (also styled as Subvert.fm) is a members-owned online music distribution platform incorporated in Colorado, United States, and structured as a cooperative. The platform allows independent musicians and record labels to distribute music on their own terms, where they can sell it, set their own prices, offer the option to pay more, or simply offer it to download for free. It is collectively-owned by its members who govern it through a dual-entity structure: a limited cooperative association (Subvert Cooperative LCA) paired with a public-benefit corporation (Subvert, Inc.) that the cooperative wholly owns.

After a members-only alpha test in late 2025, the platform was publicly launched on May 12, 2026.

== Background ==
Subvert emerged from the platform cooperativism movement, which advocates for online platforms to be owned and governed by their users and workers rather than by outside investors. The Mozilla Foundation has characterised it as part of a "post-naive" generation of internet builders who prioritise structural alternatives to venture-capital-owned platforms. Its governance model draws on the work of political scientist Elinor Ostrom on the management of shared common resources. Founder Austin Robey had previously co-founded Ampled, a cooperatively owned music platform that closed in 2023 after failing to secure sufficient capital, and drew on that experience when designing Subvert's funding structure.

Subvert was announced in direct response to the successive sales of Bandcamp. In March 2022, Epic Games acquired the platform, and in October 2023 sold it to Songtradr, a music-licensing company, resulting in layoffs affecting around half of Bandcamp's staff including members of its trade union. Robey cited the sales as evidence that artists "had no voice in the decisions that affected their livelihoods".

== History ==
Subvert was publicly announced in July 2024. In October 2024, the cooperative released a 140-page zine titled Plans for an Artist-Owned Internet, available digitally for free and physically for a small fee, which generated over $125,000 in combined sales and membership income by mid-2025. By September 2025, more than 1,000 record labels had joined before launch, including Warp Records, Polyvinyl Record Co., and Thrill Jockey Records, with membership spanning 75 countries. In June 2025 the cooperative held its first board election, expanding its board to six members, and the founding team visited Mondragón, the Basque worker cooperative federation, which Robey cited as an inspiration for the long-term vision.

The alpha platform opened to founding members on November 4, 2025, and was extended to the broader membership later that month. As of early 2026, the platform remained in member-only testing ahead of a planned public launch, with more than 14,000 artist, label, and supporter co-owners.

== Structure and governance ==
The cooperative holds 100% of the voting shares of the corporation. Membership is open to artists and labels free of charge; supporter membership costs a one-time fee of $100. Both tiers carry the same voting rights on a one-member, one-vote basis. The six-member board elected in June 2025 comprises Austin Robey, Sean Adams, Iz Ocampo, Hannah Lee Benson (artist representative), Nick Austin (supporter representative), and Freya Yamamoto (Board Chair, label representative), with Robey, Adams, Lucy Liu, and Mitchell Maynard serving as worker-members.

== Business model ==
Following a membership vote, Subvert adopted a 0% platform fee, with the full purchase price going to the artist or label and buyers presented with an optional contribution at checkout. Subvert has acknowledged the model is experimental, comparing it to GoFundMe's switch from a mandatory fee to optional tipping and committing to publicly evaluating its sustainability by May 2026. The cooperative also raised $650,000 through SAFE instruments, with investors receiving rights to future equity in the corporation but no voting control over the cooperative. The platform launched with digital downloads; physical media and streaming were listed as subsequent roadmap items, with the absence of streaming noted by commentators as a meaningful gap relative to Bandcamp. AI-generated music and artwork are prohibited, with violations subject to expulsion from the cooperative.

== Reception ==
Coverage ahead of launch was broadly positive about the cooperative model while noting the scale of the challenge. Attack Magazine described the platform as a "concrete response" to Bandcamp's corporate trajectory but cautioned that navigating cooperative governance while meeting users' practical needs remained to be seen. Music Ally noted that Robey's previous platform, Ampled, had failed due to resource constraints, raising questions about whether Subvert had adequately addressed the same underlying problems. In a 2025 buyer's guide, Ethical Consumer gave Subvert a perfect score for artist compensation while acknowledging it was "usually hesitant to recommend an untested company". The Red Bulletin placed Subvert within a broader field of emerging streaming alternatives and concluded that all had been operating for too short a time for their viability to be assessed. In 2025, The Guardian placed Subvert among a growing number of "anti-corporate" music streaming platforms including Nina Protocol and Cantilever. A November 2024 analysis raised questions about the specificity of the zine's governance language and suggested portions may have been drafted with generative AI tools.

== See also ==
- Bandcamp
- Platform cooperativism
- Elinor Ostrom
- Mondragon Corporation
