= Cootie Catcher (band) =

Canadian indie pop band

cootie catcher (Note: Stylized in lowercase)
- Origin: Toronto, Ontario, Canada
- Genres: Indie pop
- Years active: 2022–present
- Members: Anita Foul; Nolan Jakupovskil; Sophia Chavez; Joseph Shemoun
- Past members: Brendan Cooke

Cootie Catcher (stylized in lowercase) is a Canadian indie pop band from Toronto. In 2022, they released their debut album Stupid Is As Stupid Does. Followed by their sophomore album Shy At First (2025) and their third album Something We All Got (2026) on Carpark Records. The group have been described as part of the laptop twee movement by Pitchfork.

== History ==
The group began as a creative outlet for singer and bassist Anita Foul and singer and guitarist Nolan Jakupovskil. In 2022, they released their debut album Stupid Is As Stupid Does. In 2025, the group released their second full-length album Shy at First on The Cooked Raw Label. That same year they signed to Carpark Records and later released their third studio album Something We All Got in 2026.

In March 2026, writing for Pitchfork, music journalist Jude Noel described Cootie Catcher as "Working in the vein of 'laptop twee' acts like friends& and Worldpeace DMT, who fuse the genre-smashing maximalism promised by hyperpop with the whimsical optimism of ’00s buzz bands".

Something We All Got was longlisted for the 2026 Polaris Music Prize.

== Discography ==
=== Albums ===
Title	Album details
Stupid Is as Stupid Does	Released: 2022; Label: Self-released; Format: Digital download, streaming
Shy at First	Released: 2025; Label: Self-released; Format: Digital download, streaming
Something We All Got	Released: 2026; Label: Self-released; Format: Digital download, streaming

=== EPs ===
Title	EP details
1234	Released: 2021; Label: Self-released; Format: Digital download, streaming
5678	Released: 2023; Label: Self-released; Format: Digital download, streaming
curlicue	Released: 2024; Label: Self-released; Format: Digital download, streaming

=== Singles ===
Title	Single details
Friend of a Friend	Released: 2024; Label: Self-released; Format: Digital download, streaming
Gingham Dress	Released: 2025; Label: Self-released; Format: Digital download, streaming
Straight Drop	Released: 2025; Label: Self-released; Format: Digital download, streaming
Puzzle Pop	Released: 2026; Label: Self-released; Format: Digital download, streaming
Quarter note rock	Released: 2026; Label: Self-released; Format: Digital download, streaming
