= The Railway Prince Hotel =

Studio album by Tullycraft
- Released: February 8, 2019
- Recorded: Dubtrain Studio, Seattle, Washington; Jackpot!, Portland, Oregon
- Genre: Indie pop
- Length: 37:03
- Label: Happy Happy Birthday To Me (HHBTM 196)

Tullycraft chronology
Lost in Light Rotation (2013)	The Railway Prince Hotel (2019)	Shoot the Point (2025)

Professional ratings
Review scores
Source	Rating
AllMusic	4/5 stars

The Railway Prince Hotel is the seventh studio album by American band Tullycraft, released by Happy Happy Birthday To Me Records in February 2019. The album had a modestly different sound than the band's previous releases, somewhat due to the fact that long-time drummer (and original Tullycraft member) Jeff Fell, did not make an appearance on the album, but also because of the new approach the members of the band took to the recording process. Much of the album was improvised during the recording sessions. This was an untried approach for Tullycraft. Equipped with lyrics and vocal melodies (provided by Tollefson) the band composed many of the new songs from the ground up in the studio.

Most of the album was recorded and mixed by Pete Remine at Dubtrain Studio in Seattle, Washington. Four of the tracks were mixed by Larry Crane at Jackpot! Studio in Portland, Oregon.

== Reception ==
A review by Rich Quinlan in Jersey Beat says "having been immersed in college radio in the mid-90s, I did become aware of the twee and cuddlecore movements," continuing "incredibly, more than twenty years later, this Seattle outfit continues to hang on to their collective innocence, blending the most pop-friendly tempos and sprinkling in lighthearted, sentimental lyrics that point out the most minute of details with good natured sarcasm."

== Track listing ==
All tracks by Tullycraft

1. "Midi Midinette"
2. "Passing Observations"
3. "We Couldn't Dance to Billy Joel"
4. "Goldie and the Gingerbreads"
5. "Has Your Boyfriend Lost His Flavor on the Bedpost Overnight?"
6. "Beginners at Best"
7. "It's Not Explained, It's Delaware"
8. "Lost Our Friends to Heavy Metal"
9. "Hearts at the Sound"
10. "The Cat's Miaow in a Spacesuit"
11. "The Railway Prince Hotel"
12. "Vacaville"

== Players ==
- Sean Tollefson – vocals, electric piano
- Chris Munford – guitar, piano, bass, melodica, Casiotone 405, plastic horns, vocals
- Jenny Mears – vocals
- Corianton Hale – guitar, hand held percussion, ukulele, melodica, vocals

== Additional players ==
- Evan Mosher – trumpet, flugelhorn
- Wayne Meaphnel – drums
- Pete Remine – additional vocals on "Vacaville"

== Videos ==
A video for "Passing Observations" was released ahead of the album in December 2018.

== Limited edition ==
A limited-edition white vinyl version of the LP was released by Rough Trade Records in the UK (only 100 were pressed).
