= Peace + War =

Studio album by Bassvictim
- Released: November 6, 2026
- Recorded: 2026
- Studio: Vietnam
- Length: 57:07
- Languages: English; Polish
- Labels: VOTB; Warner
- Producer: Ike Clateman

Bassvictim chronology
? (2026)	Peace + War (2026)

Singles from Peace + War
- 1. "Jagódki (Blueberries)" Released: September 4, 2026; 2. "White Flag" Released: October 21, 2026

Peace + War (stylized in all caps) is the second studio album by electronic music duo Bassvictim. It was released on November 6, 2026, through VOTB and Warner Records.

== Background and recording ==
Peace + War was recorded in the spring of 2026 in a home studio located in Vietnam.

== Critical reception ==
Writing for The Guardian, Alexis Petridis rated the album three out of the five stars and said: "US-Polish pair are best when they’re leaning into the roughness of their sound".

== Track listing ==
All tracks written by Maria Manow, Ike Clateman and produced by Ike Clateman, unless noted otherwise.

No.	Title	Length
1.	"God I Wonder"	2:18
2.	"Happysad"	3:19
3.	"7" (featuring Fimiguerrero)	3:21
4.	"Charred Glass"	3:04
5.	"Girl Wars"	2:08
6.	"Summer Song"	4:10
7.	"I Don't Know"	4:35
8.	"Endings"	3:05
9.	"Who Told You"	3:51
10.	"Wake Up"	1:36
11.	"Mummy Daddy"	3:21
12.	"Jagódki (Blueberries)"	2:31
13.	"No. 33 piano"	2:35
14.	"War Song"	1:40
15.	"Czerwone Jabłuszko"	2:31
16.	"Go Faster"	2:43
17.	"White Flag"	3:05
18.	"You Know How It Feels"	4:29
19.	"The End"	2:35
Total length:		57:07

== Personnel ==
Credits for Forever adapted from Tidal.

- Ike Clateman — producer, mixer
- Maria Manow — vocals
- Kevin Grainger — mixer, masterer, additional programming (tracks 1, 3, 5, 7, 8, 11, 14, 19)
