= Crayon (band) =

American band

- Origin: Bellingham, Washington
- Genres: Indie pop, cuddlecore
- Years active: 1990 – 1994
- Labels: Harriet Records, Cher Doll, HHBTM
- Members: Sean Tollefson, Jeff Fell, Brad Roberts

Crayon was an indie pop band from Washington State.

== History ==
Crayon formed in 1990 in Bellingham, Washington, featuring Brad Roberts (guitar/vocals), Sean Tollefson (bass/vocals) and Jeff Fell (drums). Their sound has been compared to twee and punk contemporaries including Pavement, Beat Happening, Hüsker Dü, and Sebadoh.

In the four years they were together, Crayon released a handful of 7-inch singles and one full-length album, Brick Factory, on Harriet Records.

Roberts left the group in 1994 and Tollefson & Fell went on to form the seminal indie pop band Tullycraft in 1995.

In 2014, HHBTM Records reissued Brick Factory on limited edition vinyl and cassette to commemorate the 20th anniversary of its release. The re-release met a positive reception from critics, who saw it as both an entertaining listen and an important window into music of the early 1990s.

== Discography ==
=== Cassettes ===
- 1991 A Cartwheel For A Kiss (Self Released)
- 2014 Forever Nearly True (HHBTM Records) 24 songs comprising tracks from 7-inch singles, compilations, 4-track demos and unreleased songs.

=== 7-inch singles ===
- 1991 Matchbox 3-song 7-inch EP (Harriet)
- 1992 Moominland 6-song 7-inch EP (Harriet)
- 1992 Crayon / Veronica Lake split 7-inch (Cher Doll)
- 1993 The Snap-Tight Wars 7-inch (Harriet)
- 1993 Crayon / Grover split 7-inch (Gritty Kitty)
- 1994 Phantom Third Channel split 7-inch EP (Cher Doll)

=== Albums ===
- 1994 Brick Factory CD/CS (Harriet Records)
- 2014 Brick Factory (reissue) LP/CS (HHBTM Records)

=== Compilations ===
- 1992 "Knee High Susan" on The Bellingham Conflagration (Flaming Cows Head) Cassette
- 1992 "Secret Goldfish" on Throw: The Yoyo Studio Compilation (Yoyo) CD
- 1992 "All The Stars" on One Last Kiss (Spin Art) CD
- 1993 "Penny Lock" on Julep (Yoyo) CD/Vinyl
- 1993 "Crown" on North Of Nowhere (Gritty Kitty/Spam) CD
- 1993 "Live With It Baby" on A Love Like Lead (Lionhead Fountain, Japan) Cassette
- 1994 "I Could" on A Day In The Park (Now Sound) CD/Vinyl
- 1995 "The Snap-Tight Wars" (live) on The Basement Tapes Live Recordings At KSPC 1989-1995
- 1996 "Forever Nearly True"(live) on Yoyo A Go Go (Yoyo) CD/Vinyl
- 2001 "The Snap-Tight Wars" on Songs For Cassavetes Soundtrack (Better Looking Records) CD
- 2010 "Pedal" on Tiny Idols Volume III - The Indie Underground 1991-1995 (Snowglobe Records) CD

== See also ==
- Tullycraft
- Six Cents and Natalie
