= The Femcels =

Electronic music duo

- Origin: London, United Kingdom
- Genres: Electronic pop; twee
- Years active: 2024–present

The Femcels is an English electronic pop duo formed in London by musicians Rowan Miles and Gabriella Turton in February 2024. Their debut album I Have to Get Hotter was released on January 24, 2026.

== Career ==
Rowan Miles (also known as Rowan Please) was born in Brighton, while Gabriella Turton was born in the West Country. The pair initially met on Instagram, though Turton later invited Miles to a sleepover in 2023. The pair formed a band on February 24, 2024, after going into a studio session with just the name "the Femcels". Turton had previously been styling Maria Manow of the electronic music duo Bassvictim, which led to the pair consulting Ike Clateman to produce them. The duo have cited the GTOs, the Beach Boys, the Beatles, the Roches, Leonard Cohen, Elvis Presley and Beat Happening as influences.

British magazine The Face described the pair's debut single "He Needs Me" as "a bouncy, chiptune-flavoured update of The Shining actor Shelley Duvall's cult 1980 cut". The publication described Turton as a "coder-by-day" and Miles as having a fascination for the 1960s. Pitchfork noted the group as a "Teenagers-esque pop duo". While Miles was credited as "part of the '00s-fetishizing London scene that tangentially includes fakemink and Bassvictim."

On July 8, 2025, Rowan Miles released her debut collaborative album The Velvet Underground & Rowan with Worldpeace DMT. Miles officially joined Worldpeace DMT for their next album, Flowers Powers.

On February 4, 2026, Pitchfork reviewed their debut album I Have to Get Hotter released on January 24, 2026, rating it a 7.6 and stating "LARP or not, the Femcels have a lesson for sadsack bedrotters everywhere—find a friend, hire a cracked Clateman, and start turning your cliché insecurities into corny-giddy art."

== Discography ==
=== Albums ===
Title	Album details
I Have to Get Hotter	Released: January 24, 2026; Label: —; Format: Digital download, streaming

==== With Worldpeace DMT ====
- The Velvet Underground & Rowan (2025)
- Flowers Powers (2026)
