= New Bad Things =

US musical group

- Origin: Portland, Oregon, United States
- Genres: Indie rock
- Years active: 1990s
- Labels: Candy Ass, Punk in my Vitamins, Kill Rock Stars, Freewheel
- Past members: Matthew "Hattie" Hein; Luke Hollywood "Prince" Mattie Gaunt; Dave French; Jasin Fell; Lars; Denk

New Bad Things (later No Bad Things) were a Portland, Oregon, indie rock band active during the 1990s. They recorded for Candy Ass Records, Rainforest Records, Lissy's Records, Pop Secret, Punk in my Vitamins Records, Kill Rock Stars, and Freewheel Records.

== History ==
The band formed in 1992 for a one-off opening set at a Sebadoh concert in Portland, and initially comprised Matthew "Hattie" Hein, Luke Hollywood, "Prince" Mattie Gaunt, Jasin Fell and Dave French. Their first single was "I Suck" (backed with "Concrete" and "Knott St."), which was picked up by BBC Radio 1 DJ John Peel, and reached number sixteen in the 1993 Festive 50. They recorded their debut album, Freewheel! in 1992, released on the local indie label Candy Ass Records. The album was described as having a "sloppy charm", and drew comparisons with the likes of Beat Happening. Second album Society followed in 1994, released on the United Kingdom label Lissy's. Ennui Go was released in 1997, by which time the band's sound was more pop-oriented, and in the same year Hein left to pursue a solo career. An album of previously unreleased and rare tracks, C-sides, was released in 1999, containing tracks ranging chronologically from their earliest recordings to their latest. Later band members included: Christine Denkewalter, Lars Holmstrom, Eric von Borstel and Andrew Leavitt. The band toured Europe twice and recorded John Peel sessions for Radio One in the UK each time. The band name changed to No Bad Things in 2001.

Members also recorded as: Matthew Hein (solo), Wallpaper (David French), Awesome (Luke Hollywood with guest appearances from other NBT alumni), Gashdig, Popewyrm, Incinerators & Diamond Tuck (Jasin Fell), Denk (solo), The Loach Clips (Lars), and Prince Mattie Gaunt (solo). Leavitt later joined The Fairways.

New Bad Things feature in the documentary film X-Ray Visions: a Look Inside Portland's Legendary X-Ray Café.

The bands' songs have been covered by Hefner ("Goethe's Letter to Vic Chesnutt"), The Delgados ("The Dirge") and Tullycraft ("Misgiving").

== Album discography ==
- Freewheel (Candy Ass, 1992)
- Society (Lissy's, UK only)
- Ennui Go (Pop Secret, 1997)
- C-Sides (Blackbean & Placenta Tape Club, 1999)
