= Little Teddy Recordings =

- Founded: 1990
- Genre: Indie pop, twee pop, indie rock, punk rock, garage rock
- Country of origin: Germany
- Location: Munich
- Official website: littleteddy.net

Little Teddy Recordings is an Austro-German independent record label based in Munich, Germany established in 1990 by Andreas Freiberger and Armin Kasperas as a platform for their band The Bartlebees. The label has released recordings, sometimes debut recordings, from many artists including Pete and the Pirates, Television Personalities, Sleaford Mods, Stereo Total, Tullycraft, The Mad Scene, Crystal Stilts, The Wave Pictures, The Bats, The Silly Pillows, and The Cannanes.

== List of Artists (selection) ==
- The Bartlebees
- The Bats
- The Cannanes
- Crystal Stilts
- Daniel Johnston
- The Go-Betweens
- Koufax
- The Legends
- Luna
- Liam Lynch
- The Mad Scene
- M.O.T.O.
- Pete and the Pirates
- Quit Your Dayjob
- The Silly Pillows
- Sleaford Mods
- Stereo Total
- Television Personalities
- The Wave Pictures
- Tullycraft
