= Six Cents and Natalie =

Lo-fi band

- Origin: Seattle
- Genres: lo-fi
- Labels: Black Bean & Placenta, Harriet Records, self-released
- Members: Sean Tollefson

Six Cents and Natalie is the sporadic side-project of Tullycraft lead singer Sean Tollefson. This lo-fi band actually predates Tollefson's pre-Tullycraft band Crayon. Six Cents and Natalie released a series of cassette tapes and 7-inch singles in the mid 1990s. Eventually, two full-length CDs were released by Black Bean & Placenta Tape Club that compiled most of the material found on the early cassettes and singles.

== Discography ==
=== Cassettes ===
- Water Machine (cassette) self-released (1992)
- Tressel (cassette) self-released (1993)
- Let's Pretend We're Married (cassette) self-released (1993)

=== Singles and EPs ===
- Boyfriends (7-inch) Harriet Records (1993)
- Learning To Share EP (split 7-inch) Sudden Shame Records (1994)
- Summer's Gone But A Lot Goes On (7-inch) Burden of Joy Records (1994)
- When Punk Fell To Earth (7-inch) Rubber Goldfish Records (1995)
- Six Cents & Natalie / Phlegm (split 7-inch) Black Bean & Placenta Tape Club (1997)

=== Albums ===
- Show Me The Honey (CD) Black Bean & Placenta Tape Club (1999)
- When Punk Fell To Earth (CD) Black Bean & Placenta Tape Club (2001)

=== Compilations ===
- Fluttered - compilation (cassette) "Fire Walk With Me" Big Jim Records, (1995)
- Jet-Age Circuit Rider - compilation (cassette) "Untitled" Slabco, (1995)
- The Long Secret - compilation (CD) "Quilting Bee" Harriet Records, (1995)
- Cosmic Slop - compilation (cassette) "Just One" Paperplane, (1995)
- La Blackbean Taqueria - compilation (LP) "Easter Sunday" Blackbean And Placenta Tape Club, (1995)
- Childhood Friends - compilation (cassette) "You And Me" Brassland, (1995)
- Extended Vacation - compilation (cassette) "Jake Ryan" Krebstar Records, (1996)
- Chutes & Ladders - compilation (cassette) "The Sadness Of Science" Cactus Gum Recordings, (1996)
- Whiskey, You're The Devil - compilation (CD) "Showgirls" Cactus Gum Recordings, (1996)
- Wish I Was... - compilation (cassette) "Shelly" Lil' Red Wagon, (1996)
- As Seen On TV - compilation (CD) "My Date With Rachel Sweet" Spare Me Records, (1996)
- Pop Machine - compilation (cassette) "Tag" Cowly Owl !, (1997)
- The Storm Of The Century - compilation (CD) "My Date With Rachel Sweet" Sudden Shame, (1997)
- Never Kept A Diary - compilation (CD) "Baywatch Nights" Motorcoat Records, (1998)
- The Sidewalk Chalk Adventure - compilation (7-inch) "You Could Be The One" Kittridge Records, (1999)
- Kindercore Christmas Two - compilation (CD) "Secret Santa" Kindercore Records, (1999)
- Build Your Own Radio - compilation (CD) "Bessy" Bumblebear Records, (2000)
- Sweet Sweet Casio - compilation (CD) "Devil In Your Heart" North Of January, (2001)
- The Way Things Change Volume 4 - compilation (CD) "Christine, North Dakota" Red Square, (2002)
