= Rizzo (band) =

American punk band from Los Angeles

- Origin: Los Angeles, California, United States
- Genres: Punk; Indie rock
- Years active: 1995–2002
- Labels: Sympathy For The Record Industry; Cher Doll Records; Harriet Records
- Past members: Jen Abercrombie; Sarah DeAngelis

Rizzo was an American punk band from Los Angeles, California, United States.

== History ==
Sarah Dale (drums and vocals) and Jen Abercrombie (guitar and vocals) formed the band in 1995. They originally called themselves Mopar, but after discovering that they had both played the role of Rizzo in their high school productions of Grease, they changed their name to that of the character. In addition to the Phoning It In LP/CD produced in 2001, Rizzo released one single, recorded by Jimmy Tamborello, and two split singles. Abercrombie also contributed vocals to the Tullycraft albums City of Subarus and Disenchanted Hearts Unite.

== Discography ==
=== Singles and EPs ===
- One Way Ticket To Vegas, cassette EP (1996)
- Tullycraft / Rizzo split 7-inch, Harriet Records (1997)
- Shymaster 7-inch EP, Cher Doll Records (1998) - recorded by Jimmy Tamborello at his apartment.

=== Albums ===
- Phoning It In CD/LP. Sympathy For The Record Industry (2001)

=== Compilations ===
- Something Cool compilation, CD, "Allie" Cher Doll Records, (1997)
- Little Darla Has A Treat For You (Vol. 10) compilation, CD, "TheJoke's On You" Darla Records, (1998)
- It Takes Two, Baby 7-inch EP, Sympathy For The Record Industry (2001)
- "Gigantic: a tribute to Kim Deal" compilation CD, "Doe" American Laundromat Records (2008)

== General and cited references ==
- Strong, M. C. (2003). The Great Indie Discography (2nd Edition) p. 944. Published by Canon Books Ltd. (US/CAN) ISBN 1-84195-335-0.
