= Rumspringa (album) =

Studio album by Ear
- Released: May 29, 2026
- Genres: Electronica, laptop twee
- Length: 30:01
- Label: A24

Ear chronology
The Most Dear and the Future (2025)	Rumspringa (2026)

Singles from Rumspringa
- 1. "Ne Plus Ultra" Released: May 8, 2026

Rumspringa is the second album by American electronic music duo Ear. It was released on May 29, 2026, through A24 Music, the band's first under the label. The album is named after Rumspringa, an Amish rite of passage where youth are given the opportunity to remain in their community or leave.

== Critical reception ==
Rumspringa received positive reviews from critics. In a 7.3/10 review for Pitchfork, Samuel Hyland wrote that "at its most inventive, Rumspringa stretches with gleeful abandon, stringing together spare parts until they come alive", and described the band's vocals as "crisp but never quite confident".

In a positive review for Rolling Stone, Jeff Ihaza described the songs as both "homesprung and futuristic", and praised the "restrained" style of production which allowed the duo to find "transcendence in the space between a bedroom and a rave".

== Track listing ==
Track listing is adapted from Tidal.

All tracks are written by Jonah Paz and Yaelle Avtan.

Rumspringa track listing
No.	Title	Length
1.	"Coil"	3:45
2.	"Rumspringa"	3:17
3.	"Ne Plus Ultra"	2:49
4.	"Water and Power"	3:01
5.	"Threads"	3:04
6.	"Will"	3:24
7.	"Nothing's Open"	1:47
8.	"F"	2:57
9.	"Amsterdam"	2:32
10.	"Good Day Will Arive"	3:16
Total length:		30:01
