= Cher Doll Records =

American independent record label

- Founded: 1993
- Founder: Nancy Ostrander
- Genre: Pop, rock
- Country of origin: United States
- Location: Seattle, Washington

Cher Doll Records is an American independent record label founded in Seattle, Washington, by Nancy Ostrander in 1993. The label released records for several indie-pop bands, including Neutral Milk Hotel's first single.

== History ==
Founder Nancy Ostrander was inspired to start Cher Doll by the fanzine and record label Four Letter Words, one of the earliest of the American indiepop labels started up in response to the C86 and twee movements in the UK. Cher Doll started out as a seven-inch singles-only label associated with Ostrander's Hip Clown Rag fanzine.

In 1992 Cher Doll released Crayon's "The Dream is Gone" and Veronica Lake's "Sleepyhouse" on a split 7-inch record, as well as Crayon's 1994 Phantom Third Channel split 7-inch EP. The label also recorded for Blanket, a Seattle band inspired by Spacemen 3 and the Velvet Underground whose members went on to play in Sno*Boy and Tullycraft.

In 1993, at that time living in Seattle, Jeff Mangum of Neutral Milk Hotel sent a tape of material recorded on a four-track to Ostrander, who found the music and Mangum intriguing: "It was fuzzy and happy and catchier than heck. I like music that is actual songs—the shorter the better—and he got bonus points for Snow Song sounding like the Jesus and Mary Chain." She selected two songs and released the group's first single "Everything Is"/"Snow Song Pt. 1". Mangum said, "The single was a Godsend because [sic] I was pretty much at the end of my rope with just about everything in my life at that point. I'd moved away from my home and all my friends for the first time and I was very much alone and sad ... she saved me merely by saying she wanted to do a single."

In 1994, Cher Doll also released Neutral Milk Hotel's "Up and Over" on the compilation 7-inch EP The Amazing Phantom Third Channel; Mangum wrote it to resolve his fear and confusion. The band's "Invent Yourself a Shortcake", released by Cher Doll on the compilation EP, Champagne Dancing Party, in 1995, included Will Cullen and Bill Doss. The band released several more seven-inch singles with Cher Doll while Mangum lived in Seattle. Mangum said he was not pleased with a 7-inch record, "Bucket", on Cher Doll, because the recording made in a studio "doesn't sound like me."

Cher Doll Records cooperated on projects with "like-minded" Darla Records, founded in 1994 and producing "bright, sugary pop albums". Cher Doll issued two full-length albums, distributed by Darla Records.

Alistair Fitchett, reviewed the Something Cool compilation released by Cher Doll in 1997 as "a winner for sure", having heard from "indeipopsters that matter in the USA, it's a hit hit HIT". He said:

Cher Doll has for the past four years or so been one of the coolest small record labels in the US, nay the world. With a sweet chic approach to packaging that's devoutly rooted in the recycling of 1950s and 60s imagery, Cher Doll has always shown that it's more than possible to put together artefacts that are fun, classy, and independent. These are important factors.

In 1998, Cher Doll Records released Tullycraft's second full-length album, City of Subarus, recorded by Chris Munford, who had joined the group from Incredible Force of Junior.

== Discography ==
- CHER 01 Veronica Lake "Sleepyhouse" b/w Crayon "This Dream Is Gone", split 7-inch (1/93)
- CHER 02 Neutral Milk Hotel "Everything Is" b/w "Snow Song Pt. 1" 7-inch (8/93)
- CHER 03 Blanket "Ocean" b/w "Picked Apart" 7-inch (2/94)
- CHER 04 Various The Amazing Phantom Third Channel compilation 7-inch: Crayon "Too Much Sugar"; Watercolor Sunset "Hollywood Decay"; Neutral Milk Hotel "Up And Over We Go"; Paste "Nickels" (4/94)
- CHER 05 Various Champagne Dancing Party compilation 7-inch: Beanpole "You're Flying"; Sno*boy "Something Special" (fuzzy mix); Names For Pebbles "Imaginary Friend"; Orange Cake Mix "2CU"; New Bad Things "Rasputin"; Stuffd Bear "I'm Just A Stuffed Toy With No Self-Esteem"; Neutral Milk Hotel "Invent Yourself A Shortcake" (4/95)
- CHER 06 Incredible Force Of Junior "Stronger" b/w "Walter Johnson" 7-inch (3/95)
- CHER 07 Tullycraft "Bailey Park" b/w "Sweet" and "Pedal" 7-inch (7/95)
- CHER 08 The Lovelies "Love-Lack" b/w "Troublehead (Pt. 2)" and "The Tuff Of The Tracks" 7-inch (12/95)
- CHER 09 Various Something Cool compilation CD: Sno*boy "Parris Song"; Rizzo "Allie"; girlboy girl "Feeder"; beanpole "Destination"; The Hand-me-downs "Love You"; The Autocollants "Apple Vines"; Tag "Don't Let Them Down"; Sukpatch "Loaded Stinking Femo"; schrasj "American Standard"; Tullycraft "Falling Out Of Love (With You) (Magnetic Fields cover); gaze "Peeking Shows His Ignorance"; Names For Pebbles "Heh Someone"; Suretoss "Notice"; Incredible Force of Junior "Decay 'em"; Poundsign "Michigan"; The Lovelies "Weekenderman"; Diplomat Haircuts "Outside"; The Sour Mix "99°"; Orange Cake Mix "When The Sky Was Falling Down On You"; Ret & Stare "Boyfriend" (Ret & Stare Mix) (2/97)
- CHER 10 Rizzo "Shymaster" b/w "Road Song" and "Cathy's Song" 7-inch (3/98)
- CHER 11 Tullycraft City Of Subarus LP and CD: "8 Great Ways", "Belinda", "Ticket Tonight", "Crush This Town", "Godspeed", "Miss Douglas County", "Actives and Pledges", "The Lives of Cleopatra", "Bee Sting Stings", "Vacation In Christine, ND" (1/98)

== See also ==
- List of record labels
