= Old Traditions, New Standards =

Studio album by Tullycraft
- Released: 1996
- Recorded: Avast Studios, Seattle, WA & Yoyo Studios, Olympia, WA
- Genre: Indie pop
- Length: 36:37
- Labels: Harriet Records (US); Little Teddy (Germany); Darla (reissue)
- Producer: Pat Maley

Tullycraft chronology
Old Traditions, New Standards (1996)	City of Subarus (1998)

Professional ratings
Review scores
Source	Rating
Allmusic	4/5 stars

Old Traditions, New Standards is the debut album from the Washington-based indie pop band Tullycraft. In 2022, Old Traditions, New Standards was included on Pitchfork's list of The 25 Best Indie Pop Albums of the '90s.

The album was produced by Pat Maley. Tracks were recorded at Avast Studios in Seattle and mixed at Yoyo Studios in Olympia. The album was originally released on Harriet Records out of Cambridge, Massachusetts. Robynn Iwata from the band cub provided guest vocals on the song "Josie," and Chris Munford from the band Incredible Force of Junior provided guest vocals on the song "Mental Obsession."

The album reached #22 on the CMJ Top 200 chart. The song "Pop Songs Your New Boyfriend's Too Stupid to Know About" was listed as essential listening in Pitchfork Media's 2005 article on twee pop entitled "Twee as Fuck."

== Track listing ==
1. "Willie Goes to the Seashore"
2. "Josie"
3. "Mental Obsession"
4. "Wish I'd Kept a Scrapbook"
5. "Superboy & Supergirl"
6. "Sweet"
7. "Dollywood"
8. "Pop Songs Your New Boyfriend's Too Stupid to Know About"
9. "Then Again, Maybe I Don't"
10. "Meet Me in Las Vegas"
11. "Cammy & The Count"
12. "Miracles Are Hard to Find"

== Notes ==
- The German version of the LP (released in 1996) featured two extra songs not found on the US version: "Pitney Bose" and "Guyana Punch"

== Reissue ==
- In 2024 Old Traditions, New Standards was reissued on double vinyl by Darla Records. It was a limited pressing of the album that included a second LP that featured singles and rarities from the early period in the band’s history. This expanded edition included 15 bonus tracks that didn’t appear on the original album.

== Television ==
- In 2018 the song "Superboy & Supergirl" was featured in the first episode of the Netflix series The End of the F***ing World, based on the graphic novel The End of the Fucking World by Charles S. Forsman.

== Personnel ==
- Sean Tollefson – vocals, bass
- Jeff Fell – drums
- Gary Miklusek – guitar, backing vocals
- Pat Maley – production, audio engineering
- Aaron Gorseth – production assistance

== Additional personnel ==
- Robynn Iwata – vocals on "Josie"
- Chris Munford – vocals on "Mental Obsession"
- Susan Robb – vocals on "Then Again, Maybe I Don't"

== Controversy ==
In 2007 the song "Sweet" was used in a television commercial for the hot-dog chain Wienerschnitzel. The song was licensed without the band's knowledge or permission. The licensing was handled by Darla, the California-based record label that had reissued the album Old Traditions, New Standards. The band was upset when they learned of the commercial, and a dispute between Tullycraft and Darla ensued.
