= Ear (band) =

American electronic music duo

- Origin: Annandale-on-Hudson, New York, U.S.
- Genres: Electronic pop; laptop twee
- Years active: 2024–present
- Labels: A24; Surf Gang
- Members: Jonah Paz; Yaelle Avtan
- Website: ear-music.org

Ear (stylized in lowercase) is an American electronic music duo consisting of musicians and producers Jonah Paz and Yaelle Avtan, formed in 2024. The group released their debut album The Most Dear and the Future in September 2025, with the song "Real Life" was listed among the best songs of 2025 by The Fader.

== History ==
Jonah Paz and Yaelle Avtan met in 2024 while attending Bard College in Annandale-on-Hudson, New York. They bonded over shared musical interests including British post-punk, IDM, and the work of Mark Linkous of Sparklehorse. Paz was noted as being into twee and had previously performed in the group the Barns, while Avtan was into digital hardcore. Prior to making music, Paz worked as a painter and Avtan worked as a ceramicist.

The duo recorded their debut single "Nerves" in 2024 on Avtan's iPhone in their university library. Within a few months the track garnered the group "200k monthly Spotify listeners". After a series of releases, they performed a small number of shows. In September 2025, Ear released their debut album The Most Dear and The Future. After performing as a supporting act for Yung Lean in Canada and at a backyard concert at UCLA, the duo performed a sold-out European tour, including two sold-out shows in London at Ormside Projects. Paz formed the solo project Sacred Holes in 2025. The band's album Rumspringa released on May 29, 2026.

== Artistry ==
The British magazine The Face described Ear as "the no-caps, lower-case sound of the indietronic underground". Their song "Real Life" was listed in a feature of the "51 best songs of 2025" by The Fader Writer Hajin Yoo observed of Ear's style that their songs "[begin] gently, shy vocals ease over a lilting, sing-song synth [...] But the soft beginning belies the anxiety bubbling underneath the surface, evinced in stuttering electronic chords that never quite explode to full-out dissonance." Kieran Press-Reynolds of Pitchfork described the band's music as "small, sampledelic pop"; his profile of the band noted their core influences at the time as Gud's music under the alias Rooster, and the musical output of the Microphones.

Paz uses Ableton Live to produce music for the band, often utilizing its built-in effects. Both members write and sing songs, with Avtan providing Paz with found sound samples. For example, they opted to record and use voice memos of guitars during the recording of Rumspringa.

== Discography ==
=== Albums ===
- The Most Dear and the Future (2025), Surf Gang
- Rumspringa (2026), A24 Music

=== Singles ===
- "Nerves" (2024), self-released
- "Fetish" / "Valley Serpent" (2025), self-released
- "Theorem" (2025), Surf Gang
- "Ne Plus Ultra" (2026), A24 Music
