= Baby I'm Yours (EP) =

EP by Math and Physics Club
- Released: 2007
- Genre: Indie rock, twee pop
- Label: Matinée Recordings

Math and Physics Club chronology
Math and Physics Club (2006)	Baby I'm Yours (2007)

Baby I'm Yours is the third EP by Seattle indie pop band Math and Physics Club.

== Production ==
Producer/engineer Kevin Suggs at Avast! Studio produced the first three songs on the EP, the fourth was produced by the band's bassist Ethan Jones. The song "A Little Romance" from the Matinee Hit Parade compilation was also recorded during these EP sessions.

== Reception ==
Professional ratings
Review scores
Source	Rating
Allmusic	3/5 stars

A reviewer in Left Hip Magazine called Baby I'm Yours "the finest Math and Physics Club release yet."

A review of the album on the website Three Imaginary Girls stated, "the band is the master of its domain, crafting soft and beautiful pop songs with the best of them."

In Allmusic, a reviewer said, "This is easy-going twee pop at its least angsty and most in love..."

== Track listing ==
1. "Baby I'm Yours" (Math and Physics Club) - 2:22
2. "Nothing Really Happened" (Math and Physics Club, Hall) - 3:26
3. "In This Together" (Math and Physics Club ) - 2:54
4. "Do You Keep a Diary?" (Math and Physics Club ) - 3:25

== Personnel ==
- Barry Corliss – mastering
- Kevin Emerson – group member
- Saundrah Humphrey – group member
- Kevin Suggs – producer, engineer, mixing
