= Nina Protocol =

American audio streaming and media service provider

- Type: Private
- Industry: Music streaming, Blockchain, Music distribution
- Founded: 2021
- Founders: Jack Callahan, Mike Pollard, Eric Farber
- Defunct: July 15, 2026
- Fate: Acquired by SoundCloud
- Headquarters: New York City, New York, United States
- Products: Music streaming platform
- Services: Music streaming, music distribution, online marketplace
- Website: ninaprotocol.com

Nina Protocol was an American audio streaming and media service provider founded in New York in 2021 by Jack Callahan, Mike Pollard, and Eric Farber. Emerging during the 2020s NFT-boom, the platform was a decentralized, blockchain-based music distribution service, forum and marketplace that allowed independent artists to sell music directly to fans and retain all of their revenue. The platform shut down in July 2026 and was acquired by SoundCloud.

== History ==
Nina Protocol was founded in New York in 2021 by Jack Callahan, Mike Pollard, and Eric Farber. Writing for Rolling Stone magazine, Jeff Ihaza described the site as a remnant of the "2020s NFT-boom". Though he adds that the platform has avoided "the familiar Crypto hype cycles". The platform acts as a peer-to-peer streaming service which encourages artists to upload their work to its blockchain. According to a 2025 article on the platform by The Guardian, the site's staff is a "five-person team". The site's use of blockchain allows to "cut out the middle man of private profit-oriented companies". The platform focused on niche music scenes and communities.

Nina Protocol has pushed for curated discovery for experimental and independent artists such as Surf Gang and Jawnino. The site has largely been described as an opposition to mainstream streaming platforms like Spotify who focus on primarily algorithmically curated playlists focused on larger artists. Nina Protocol was among a class of emerging "anti-corporate" music streaming platforms such as Subvert and Cantilever. The platform also coined its own musical categories such as "cloud rock". In 2025, Mike Pollard the founder of Nina Protocol stated in an interview with The Guardian that "I can see a world where Spotify doesn't exist".

On May 28, 2026, the platform announced that its streaming service and marketplace would be offline by July 15. In July 2026, SoundCloud acquired Nina Protocol and allowed artists to opt into merging their music catalogues into SoundCloud.

In a post-mortem quantitative analysis, Components revealed that about $50,000 was spent on the platform during its lifetime. The Fader stated "Nina Protocol didn't change the world, but it still built something worthwhile" adding that "in a commercial ecosystem that prefers scale to passion, Nina Protocol simply wasn't able to rally the wide and quick interest necessary to stay afloat".

== See also ==
- List of online music databases
