= Tullycraft =

American indie pop band

- Tullycraft performing in 2007

Background information
- Origin: Seattle, Washington, U.S.
- Genres: Indie pop, twee pop, cuddlecore
- Years active: 1995–present
- Labels: Little Teddy Recordings; Magic Marker Records; Harriet Records; Darla; Cher Doll; Fortuna Pop!; Fika Recordings; Happy Happy Birthday To Me Records
- Members: Sean Tollefson; Chris Munford; Jenny Mears; Corianton Hale
- Past members: Jeff Fell; Gary Miklusek; Harold Hollingsworth
- Website: tullycraft.com

Tullycraft is an American indie pop band from Seattle, Washington, that formed in 1995. They were an early part of the American twee pop movement. They are known for their DIY ethic, only releasing albums on independently owned and operated record labels.

== History ==
=== Formation and early recordings ===
The band's original line-up was Sean Tollefson (bass/vocals), Gary Miklusek (guitar/vocals), and Jeff Fell (drums).

Prior to forming Tullycraft, both Tollefson and Fell played in the band Crayon in Bellingham, Washington and Miklusek played in the band Wimp Factor 14 in Pittsburgh, Pennsylvania. They met each other while their respective bands were on tour together.

On February 28, 1995, Tullycraft played their first show at ReBar, a small club in Seattle. Joining them on the bill that evening was the band Incredible Force of Junior. Eventually, Chris Munford (from Incredible Force of Junior) would join the group.

In October 1995 the band recorded four songs with producer Pat Maley at Yoyo Studios in Olympia, Washington. The recording session produced a debut single released on Harriet Records and an instant indiepop classic "Pop Songs Your New Boyfriend's Too Stupid To Know About". This song was listed as essential listening in Pitchfork's 2005 article on Twee Pop entitled "Twee as Fuck."

=== Old Traditions, New Standards ===
In 1996 the band released their full-length debut, Old Traditions, New Standards on Harriet Records. The album included the singles "Superboy & Supergirl" and "Josie". In 2022, Old Traditions, New Standards was included on Pitchfork's list of The 25 Best Indie Pop Albums of the '90s. The following year the band released a series of 7-inch singles on labels in Japan, England, Germany, and the U.S. They built up a large following by touring extensively all over the United States.

=== City of Subarus ===
Chris Munford officially joined Tullycraft in 1998 after a few guest appearances with the group. Munford contributed keyboards, guitar and recording engineer to the band's second full-length album, City of Subarus, released by Cher Doll Records that same year. The entire album was recorded in a house that Munford, Miklusek and Fell rented near the University of Washington in Seattle. Sean wrote about the experience of making this album on the band's website.

=== The Singles ===
Guitarist and founding member Gary Miklusek decided to leave the group after a U.S. tour for the City of Subarus album. His last appearance with the band was at the San Francisco Popfest in 1999. After the departure of Miklusek, the band's future was unclear. During the break, a 22-track compilation of singles, B-sides and rarities, The Singles, was released by Darla Records in late 1999.

=== Beat Surf Fun ===
Following a hiatus that lasted most of 2000, the band started the writing process for what would become their third full-length album, Beat Surf Fun. Recording commenced in 2001 at a rehearsal space in Ballard, Washington. Harold Hollingsworth was recruited to take over lead guitar duties. Hollingsworth had played with the band briefly in 1997 on a U.S. tour.

Beat Surf Fun was released by Magic Marker Records in 2002. The album included the singles "Wild Bikini" and "Twee". In 2003, Tullycraft played shows in England, Sweden, Norway, and the Netherlands in support of the Beat Surf Fun album.

=== Disenchanted Hearts Unite ===
In 2004, the band began working on what would be their fourth full-length album, Disenchanted Hearts Unite. Just prior to the album's release, guitarist Harold Hollingsworth left the band.

On May 3, 2005 Disenchanted Hearts Unite was released by Magic Marker Records. The band re-emerged with a new line-up that included Corianton Hale (lead guitar) and Jenny Mears (vocals). Some critics consider the album to be the band's finest. Although Tullycraft did not embark on a full U.S. tour to promote Disenchanted Hearts Unite, they did play a number of universities, the occasional pop festival, and the SXSW music festival in Austin, Texas in 2006 and 2007.

=== Every Scene Needs a Center ===
On October 23, 2007, the fifth full-length album, Every Scene Needs a Center, was released by Magic Marker Records. The band spent over a year working on the album, splitting time between their own recording studio and Soundhouse Studio in Seattle, Washington. Described as a vampire indie-pop opera, the album included the singles "The Punks Are Writing Love Songs" and "Georgette Plays a Goth". In 2015 Magic Marker Records reissued Every Scene Needs a Center on limited edition vinyl.

=== Lost in Light Rotation ===
After a three-year hiatus the band began working on a new album during the summer of 2012. Recording began with Pete Remine at Dubtrain Studio in Seattle. The songs were mixed at Avast Recording Co. with producer Phil Ek. The result was the band's sixth album, Lost in Light Rotation – the first Tullycraft full-length since 2007's Every Scene Needs a Center. The album received some of the best press in the band's career.

In January 2013 Fortuna Pop! released a 7-inch of the title track as the first single from the forthcoming LP. The album was co-released in April 2013 by Magic Marker Records and Fortuna Pop!

=== The Railway Prince Hotel ===
During the summer of 2017 Tullycraft regrouped and started recording what would become their seventh full-length studio album, The Railway Prince Hotel. As with their previous record, Lost in Light Rotation, the album was recorded and engineered by Pete Remine at Dubtrain Studio in Seattle, WA. After the release of a video for the song "Passing Observations" in December 2018, The Railway Prince Hotel was released by Happy Happy Birthday to Me Records on February 8, 2019.

=== Shoot the Point ===
On August 22, 2025 Tullycraft released their eighth full-length album titled, Shoot the Point on Happy Happy Birthday to Me Records. This was the third in a trilogy of albums recorded and engineered by Pete Remine at Dubtrain Studio in Seattle, WA. A video for the song "Jeanie’s Up Again and Blaring Faith by the Cure" was released ahead of the album.

=== Live ===
After years of touring fairly consistently, in 2009 Tullycraft stopped playing live. On May 23, 2009, they performed in San Francisco, California. This was billed as the last show the band would play before taking a break from performing live.

On October 15, 2024, Tullycraft reunited to play their first show in over 15 years. They performed with the UK bands, Swansea Sound and Heavenly at the Tractor Tavern in Seattle, Washington.

=== Film ===
In 2001, Tullycraft was featured alongside Sleater-Kinney, Henry's Dress, Dub Narcotic Sound System, Unwound and The Make-Up in the Justin Mitchell music documentary, Songs for Cassavetes. The song, "Pop Songs Your New Boyfriend's Too Stupid To Know About" was used in the film's opening credits.

=== Television ===
The song, "The Punks are Writing Love Songs" appeared on the CBS series, The Good Wife November 23, 2010 (Season 2, Ep. 8 "On Tap")

The song, "Superboy & Supergirl" appeared on the Netflix series, The End of the F***ing World January 5, 2018 (Season 1, Ep. 1)

=== Tribute albums ===
In 2003 a 22-song tribute album titled, First String Teenage High: The Songs of Tullycraft Played By People Who Aren't was released on AAJ/Bumblebear Records.

In 2010 Wish I'd Kept A Scrapbook: A Tribute to Tullycraft was released on Unchikun Records. This second tribute album featured 21 bands and artists covering Tullycraft songs.

=== Radio Show ===
In 2020 Sean Tollefson and his wife Liz began hosting a weekly radio show in Seattle, WA called Pop Songs Your New Boyfriend's Too Stupid to Know About. The one hour show on Space 101.1 FM features indie pop bands and artists from around the world. An archive of all the past episodes is posted here: PopSongsMixTape.

== Members ==
- Sean Tollefson – Lead vocals and bass (no longer playing bass live as of 2024)
- Chris Munford – Guitar and vocals
- Corianton Hale – Guitar, melodica, and vocals
- Jenny Mears – Vocals and tambourine
- Ethan Jones – Bass and vocals (as of 2024)
- Jackson Long – Drums (as of 2024)

== Discography ==
- Albums

| Year | Title | Label |
|---|---|---|
| 1996 | Old Traditions, New Standards | Harriet Records (CD) / Little Teddy Recordings (LP) |
| 1998 | City of Subarus | Cher Doll Records (LP/CD) |
| 2002 | Beat Surf Fun | Magic Marker Records (CD) / Little Teddy Recordings (LP/CD) |
| 2005 | Disenchanted Hearts Unite | Magic Marker Records (CD) / Little Teddy Recordings (LP/CD) |
| 2007 | Every Scene Needs a Center | Magic Marker Records (CD/LP) |
| 2013 | Lost in Light Rotation | Magic Marker Records (CD/LP) / Fortuna Pop! (CD/LP) |
| 2019 | The Railway Prince Hotel | Happy Happy Birthday To Me Records (CD/LP) |
| 2025 | Shoot the Point | Happy Happy Birthday To Me Records (CD/LP) |

- Singles and EPs

| Year | Title | Label |
|---|---|---|
| 1995 | "True Blue" 7-inch | Harriet Records |
| 1995 | "Bailey Park" 7-inch | Cher Doll Records |
| 1995 | "The Pilot" split 7-inch EP | Papercut Records |
| 1996 | "1st String Teenage High" 7-inch EP (Germany) | Little Teddy Recordings |
| 1996 | "Glove Puppet" split 7-inch EP | Glove Puppet |
| 1996 | "Josie" 7-inch (UK) | Wurlitzer Jukebox Records |
| 1997 | "Tullycraft / Bunnygrunt" split 7-inch EP | KittyBoo Records |
| 1997 | "Tullycraft / Rizzo" split 7-inch | Harriet Records |
| 1997 | "Tullycraft / Avocado Baby" split 7-inch (Japan) | 100 Guitar Mania Records |
| 2002 | "Twee" 7-inch (Germany) | Little Teddy Recordings |
| 2005 | "Our Days In Kansas" 7-inch (Germany) | Little Teddy Recordings |
| 2008 | "Tullycraft /The Smittens" split 7-inch | HHBTM Records |
| 2013 | "Lost in Light Rotation" 7-inch (UK) | Fortuna Pop! |

- Compilations

| Year | Title | Label |
|---|---|---|
| 1999 | The Singles (singles, B-sides and rarities compilation) | Darla Records (CD) |

== See also ==
- Crayon
- Six Cents and Natalie
- Cher Doll Records
- Rizzo

== Bibliography ==
- Strong, M. C. (2003). The Great Indie Discography (2nd Edition) pg. 1041. Published by Canon Books Ltd. (US/CAN) ISBN 1-84195-335-0
