= Bassvictim =

Electronic music duo

- Bassvictim in 2026

Background information
- Origin: London, England
- Genre: Electronic
- Years active: 2022–present
- Labels: Warner, VOTB, KMIF
- Members: Maria Manow; Ike Clateman

Bassvictim is an electronic music duo formed in London in 2022 by Polish-English singer songwriter Maria Manow and American musician and producer Ike Clateman. In 2025, they released their debut album Forever.

== History ==
Maria Manow was born in Bydgoszcz, Poland. Ike Clateman grew up in Denver, Colorado. Manow and Clateman first met on a trip to Berlin as two students at Goldsmiths, University of London in the summer of 2022. The pair would form Bassvictim later that year after meeting again a few months after outside the south London club Peckham Audio. This setting served as the origin for the name Bassvictim, as Clateman had stepped out to take a break from the sound inside.

After the release of their debut EP Basspunk in 2024, Byline called the duo "London's Rising Underground Act."

On October 10, 2025, Bassvictim released their debut album Forever. Pitchfork published a review on the album rating it a 7.5, stating, "Layered with clanging percussion, gnarled harp sounds, and howling synths, their production is thickset yet deceptively simple—equally rewarding in your headphones and on a massive speaker. It sounds like the past without ever feeling derivative: a memory crystallized in bass, cracked phone screens, and dingy little London flats." Pitchfork ranked the album number 49 on their list of "The 50 Best Albums of 2025". On October 20, 2025, they selected Bassvictim's "Mr. President" for their weekly playlist.

In December 2025, NME stated "the London-based duo have ushered in a glorious electroclash renaissance alongside Snow Strippers and The Hellp".

On October 21, 2026, during their White Flag tour, Bassvictim announced their second studio album, Peace + War; debuting the album's lead single "White Flag" the same day. The album was released on November 6 via VOTB and Warner Records.

== Discography ==
=== Albums ===
Title	Album details
Forever	Released: October 10, 2025; Label: VOTB; Format: Digital download, streaming, cd
Peace + War	Released: November 6, 2026; Label: VOTB, Warner Records; Format: Digital download, streaming

=== Mixtapes ===
Title	Mixtape details
Basspunk	Released: April 22, 2024; Label: KMIF; Format: Digital download, streaming, vinyl
Basspunk 2	Released: January 30, 2025; Label: VOTB; Format: Digital download, streaming, vinyl

=== EPs ===
Title	EP details
?	Released: March 6, 2026; Label: VOTB; Format: Digital download, streaming

=== Singles ===
Title	Single details	Album
"Canary Wharf Freestyle" (feat. Oatmilkandcodeine)	Released: 2023; Label: Self-released; Format: Digital download, streaming	-
"L-On-D-On"	Released: 2023; Label: VOTB; Format: Digital download, streaming	Basspunk
"Curse Is Lifted (club rmx)"	Released: 2024; Label: VOTB; Format: Digital download, streaming	-
"Alice"	Released: 2024; Label: VOTB; Format: Digital download, streaming	Basspunk 2
"Makes You Wonder"	Released: 2024; Label: VOTB; Format: Digital download, streaming	Basspunk 2
"Walk Hard (G String edit)"	Released: 2025; Label: VOTB; Format: Digital download, streaming	-
"Final Song (bod [包家巷] remix)"	Released: 2025; Label: VOTB; Format: Digital download, streaming; Collaboration with bod [包家巷]	-
"The Kids Are Coming Home"	Released: 2025; Label: VOTB; Format: Digital download, streaming; Collaboration with Worldpeace DMT	-
"Year of the Dragon"	Released: 2026; Label: VOTB; Format: Digital download, streaming; Collaboration with Worldpeace DMT	-
"Tato Freestyle"	Released: 2026; Label: VOTB; Format: Digital download, streaming	-
"Jagódki (Blueberries)"	Released: 2026; Label: VOTB; Format: Digital download, streaming	Peace + War
"White Flag"	Released: 2026; Label: VOTB; Format: Digital download, streaming	Peace + War
