= Awesome (band) =

American band

"Awesome" is a seven member band from Seattle Washington, self-described as "Part band, part art collective." The quotation marks are part of the name. The members of the band are: John Osebold, John Ackermann, Kirk Anderson, Basil Harris, Evan Mosher, David Nixon and Rob Witmer.

Although they rejected the "rock band" label, Lane Czaplinski, artistic director of On the Boards remarked, "If they are not rock musicians, there is rock payoff." Czaplinski has compared them to Polyphonic Spree.

"Awesome" began as a cabaret act thrown together by seven experienced fringe theater actors. Although they continued to perform in theatrical venues, their identity as a band and cabaret act eclipsed their status as actors. Around October 2003, several future members of "Awesome" played together in a They Might Be Giants tribute to raise money for Seattle's Open Circle Theater. Their very first performance under the name "Awesome" (with just Ackermann, Mosher, Nixon, and Osebold) was in Seattle at Annex Theater's monthly cabaret "Spin the Bottle" On February 6, 2004, and their first full-septet performance as "Awesome" was in the Jewelbox theater at Belltown bar the Rendezvous on June 30, 2004. Brendan Kiley of Seattle weekly The Stranger described that performance over a decade later and how a "privately-skeptical-but-here-to-be-supportive" audience were soon in "a state of shock" from how good the songs were, "sophisticatedly crisp and architectural while staying warm and invitingly poppy."

Their first major production was Delaware (first a multi-media stage production and later an album). Gigs as a band included performing on bills with Harvey Danger, A. C. Newman, U.S.E., The Presidents of the United States of America, and The Long Winters. They also performed at the Sasquatch! Music Festival, and did a large-scale 2010 production West at On the Boards.

Band member David Nixon is a philosophy professor at the University of Washington, Bothell. Band member Rob Witmer (accordion, clarinet, sax, bells) is a composer and sound designer for theater productions. Band member John Osebold, who writes most of the band's songs, won a 2011 Stranger Genius Award.

Many of the group's theatrical pieces are non-narrative or have only minimal, non-linear narratives. For example, No Signal (2006) was described by Seattle Times reviewer Brangien Davis as "addressing, among other topics, technical difficulties, recurring dreams, cell death, regeneration and bees."
