= Twee pop =

Subgenre of indie pop

- Stylistic origins: Indie pop; C86; post-punk; guitar pop; girl groups; bubblegum pop
- Cultural origins: Mid-to late 1980s, United Kingdom
- Derivative forms: Laptop twee

Other topics
- Anorak; jangle pop; toytown pop; alternative pop; psychedelic pop; bedroom pop

Twee pop is a subgenre of indie pop that originally emerged in the United Kingdom during the mid-to-late 1980s. The style has been described as "excessively or affectedly quaint, pretty, or sentimental" and initially rose to prominence through the NME's C86 cassette compilation, with AllMusic describing twee as "simplicity and innocence" as well as "boy-girl harmonies, lovelorn lyrics, infectious melodies, and simple, unaffected performances."

The scene was originally spearheaded by Sarah Records in the United Kingdom, which housed acts such as The Field Mice, Heavenly, and The Orchids, along with Calvin Johnson of Beat Happening's K Records in the United States. The genre continued to develop throughout the 1990s and 2000s. During the late 2000s and early to mid-2010s, a broader twee aesthetic gained prominence in popular culture, becoming associated with indie music, vintage-inspired fashion, and films, while finding a substantial following on social media platforms such as Tumblr. In the early 2020s, the aesthetic experienced renewed interest amongst Generation Z through TikTok, particularly as part of a broader revival of early 2010s fashion and internet culture. This revival inspired a microgenre known as "laptop twee."

== Etymology ==
Merriam-Webster defines "twee" as something "excessively or affectedly quaint, pretty, or sentimental." The word derives from the speech of babies. Though the term may have been used as an insult towards things perceived as effeminate, some twee pop bands, especially those from North America, have embraced the term and its connotations.

== Characteristics ==
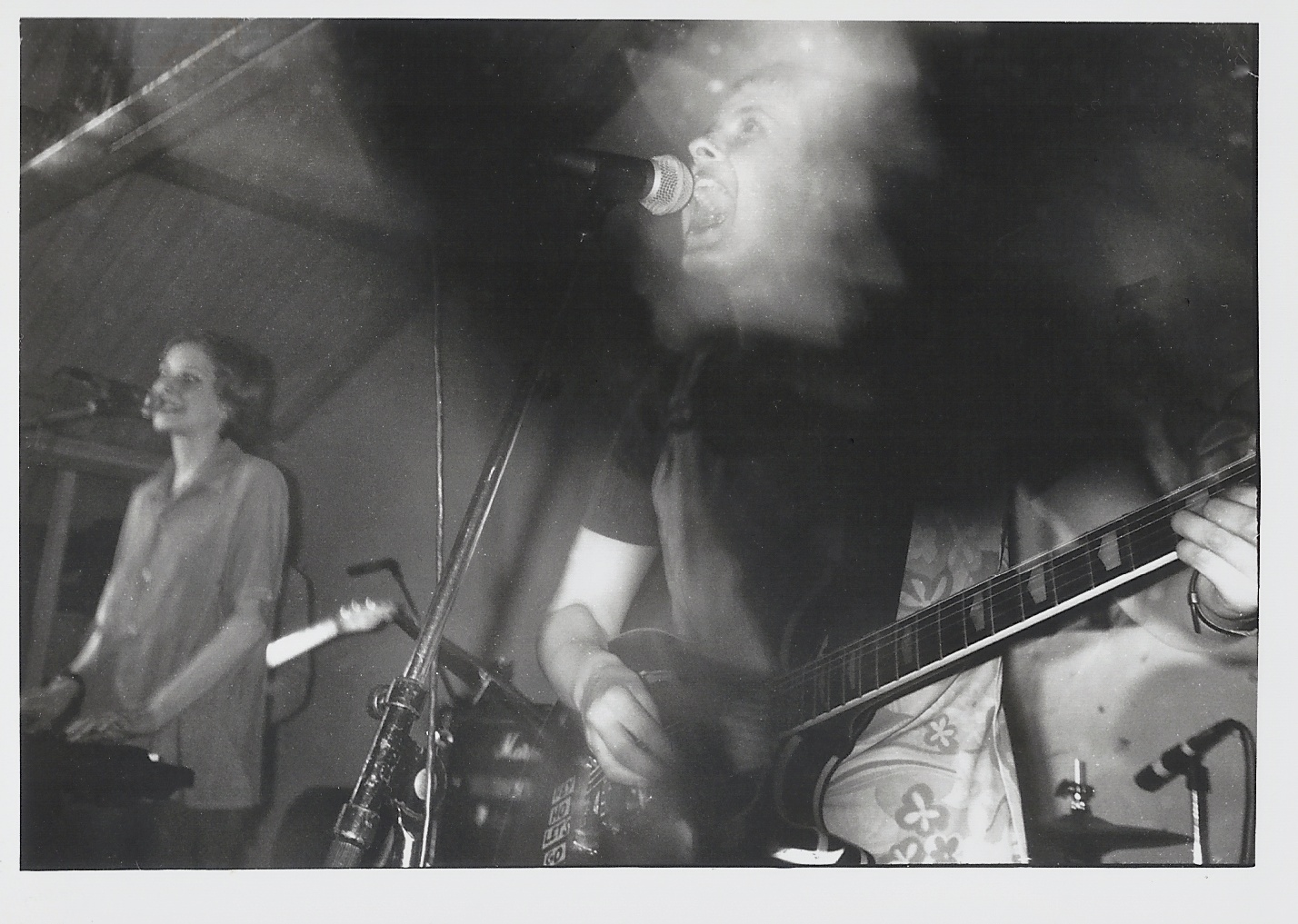
Heavenly performing at Emerald Centre

According to NPR, twee pop "was fervently informed by punk: snappy riffs, fast-track tempos, propulsive drums." Artists such as Heavenly, Talulah Gosh, and Marine Girls were primarily women who wrote about love, relationships, and personal empowerment. While the music sounded lighthearted and naive, the subject matter was often gritty and dark.

A retrospective fascination with the genre in the US saw Americans eagerly defining themselves as twee. According to The A.V. Club's Paula Mejia:

The difference between "twee" and "indie pop" is slight but polarizing. Both styles of music transcended genre, became a tape-trading lifestyle, and have similar influences, drawing from The Ramones' minimalist three-chord structures as much as The Jesus And Mary Chain's salty pop harmonies. Everyone varies slightly on origins ... Twee itself began as a vast collection of sounds, gathering the threads where luminaries left off, and carving out divergent avenues in their wake.

AllMusic states that twee pop is "perhaps best likened to bubblegum indie rock—it's music with a spirit of D.I.Y. defiance in the grand tradition of punk, but with a simplicity and innocence not seen or heard since the earliest days of rock & roll." The author Marc Spitz suggests that the roots of twee stem from post-war 1950s music. While the culture categorized itself under the moniker of "indie" (short for independent), many major twee powerhouses gained mainstream critical acclaim for their contributions to the twee movement.

== History ==
=== 1960s–1970s: Forerunners ===
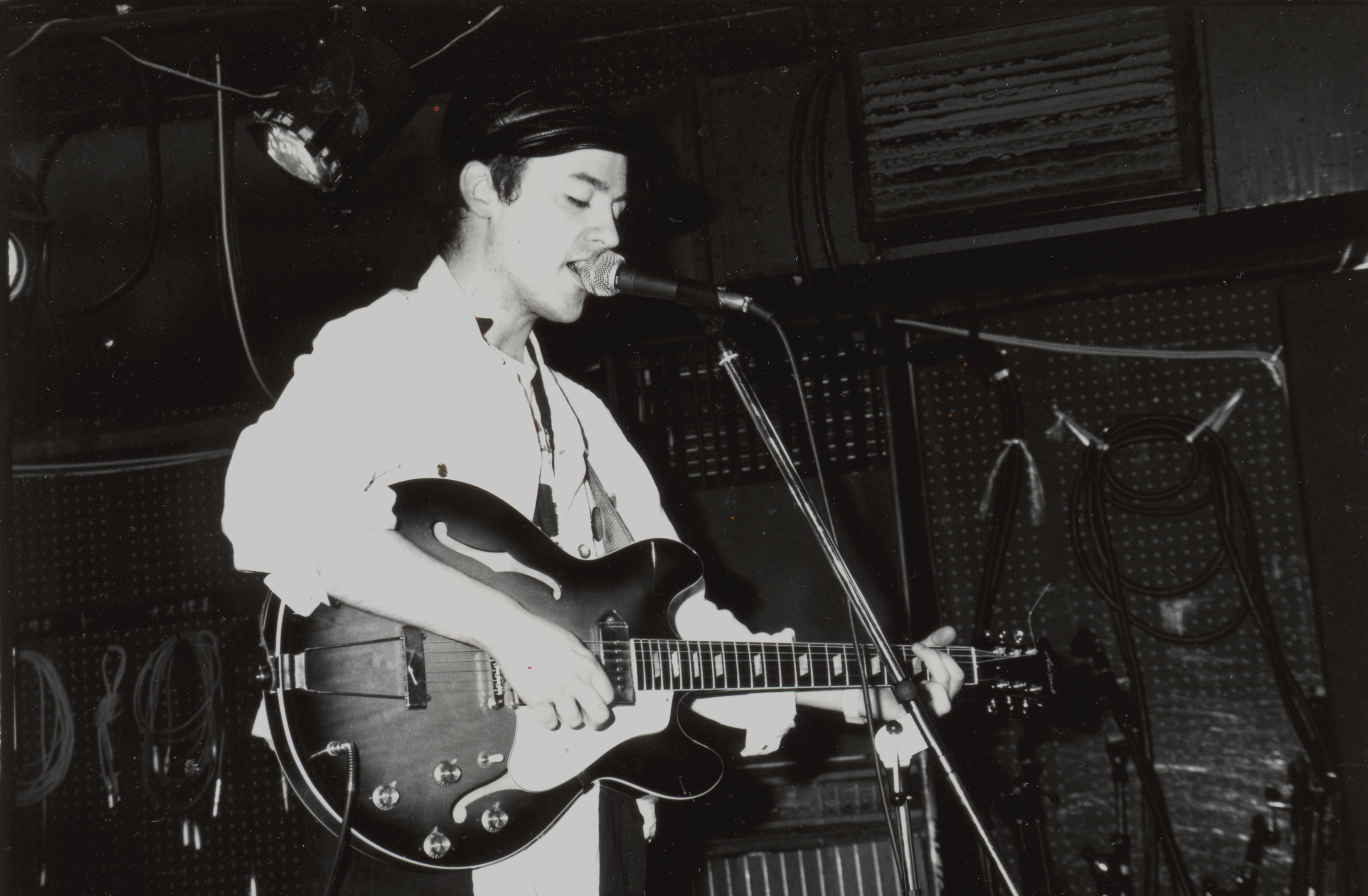
Dan Treacy's Television Personalities have been accredited as forerunners to twee pop

The Velvet Underground have been retrospectively labeled twee pop progenitors. According to Rock and Roll Globe, "Tucker's shy vocals, the simple pop arrangements that accompany them, and their nursery rhyme melodies" on songs such as "I'm Sticking with You" and "After Hours," written by Lou Reed and sung by female drummer and singer Maureen Tucker, was a "clear precursor to twee pop bands like Allo Darlin' and anti-folk singers like Kimya Dawson–hence why 'I'm Sticking with You' is the only Velvet Underground song to make the Juno soundtrack." Reed's songs have been described as having a "proto-twee sensitivity."

Similarly, the childlike innocence of Jonathan Richman's albums has been identified as precursors to the genre. Additionally, The Guardian described the Byrds as "not without doses of twee pop." Pitchfork cited David Bowie's "Kooks" and "Fill Your Heart" as "primitive twee-pop" along with The Shaggs who were described as laying "the groundwork for the faux-naivete of twee-pop and possibly K Records itself." Other influences include Syd Barrett and the Kinks.

Early indie pop musicians such as Dan Treacy of the Television Personalities would become an influence on the C86 generation and The Pastels, often referred to as "twee pop titans." Additionally, The Guardian cited Daniel Johnston as being part of twee's "tradition in alternative culture." Female-led UK post-punk groups such as The Raincoats, Marine Girls, the Particles, and Young Marble Giants have also been assessed as precursors to twee pop.

=== 1980s: Origins ===
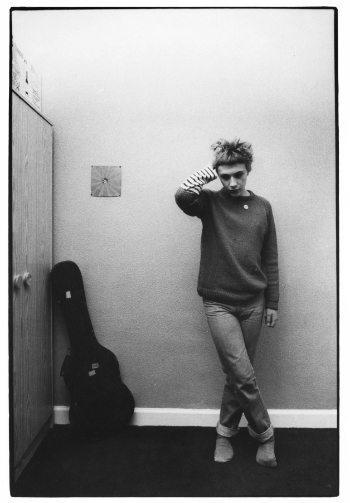
Stephen Pastel in 1982

NME released the C86 cassette in 1986, bringing together a collection of jangle pop guitar-driven indie bands, which, despite encompassing various different styles, included several artists who would become early twee pop pioneers, including the Pastels and the Shop Assistants. These bands challenged aggressive and machismo punk rock conventions by embracing a lo-fi, DIY aesthetic whilst frequently singing innocent and sensitive songs about young love and adolescence. The indie pop side of the cassette modelled themselves after and drew influence from bands like The Smiths and The Jesus and Mary Chain.

Subsequently, two English bands—Talulah Gosh, formed in 1986 in Oxford, England, and The Field Mice, formed in 1987 in London—combined lush melodies and tender lyrics with a jangly, dreamlike sound. They signed to Sarah Records, an independent record label that became the center point of the British twee pop scene. Beat Happening, a lo-fi trio from Olympia, Washington who formed in 1982, became a pivotal influence in America's own variant of the scene. Front man Calvin Johnson has been called "the first star of American twee," with his label K Records becoming a central hub for the movement.

International variants of twee and indie pop emerged in the late 1980s to early 1990s, such as Tontipop and Sonido Donosti in Spain, as well as Shibuya-kei in Japan.

=== 1990s–2000s ===
In the 1990s, twee pop bands such as Tiger Trap, the Softies and Heavenly would have their music released on Calvin Johnson of Beat Happening's independent record label K Records, helping further develop the scene. Other influential groups were Black Tambourine, Tullycraft and Velocity Girl. Cub is another band from this era; they called themselves "cuddlecore." By the 2000s, twee pop had become an influential genre in the alternative music scene, with bands like Belle and Sebastian, the Moldy Peaches, Camera Obscura, Los Campesinos!, and the Lucksmiths drawing influence from the original movement.

=== 2010s–2020s ===
During the 2010s, twee pop continued through both established musicians and newer artists. Tender Trap, formed by former members of Talulah Gosh and Heavenly, released Dansette Dansette (2010) and Ten Songs About Girls (2012). Allo Darlin' also became associated with the genre following their self-titled debut in 2010, while The Pains of Being Pure at Heart incorporated elements of twee pop whose music drew on earlier twee pop and noise pop and released three albums during the decade, including Belong (2011) and Days of Abandon (2014).

In 2012, The Guardian reported a revival of the style associated with Heavenly, identifying Shrag and Evans the Death among contemporary groups. In the United States, Tullycraft, a group associated with the earlier American twee pop movement, resumed recording after several years of inactivity, releasing Lost in Light Rotation (2013) and The Railway Prince Hotel (2019).

During the 2020s, newer groups continued to draw on the genre's earlier traditions. The San Francisco band the Umbrellas, whose music was influenced by the British and American twee pop scenes of the 1980s and 1990s, released their self-titled debut in 2021 and Fairweather Friend in 2024. The decade also saw the return of several earlier twee pop groups. The Softies released The Bed I Made in 2024, their first studio album in 24 years. Heavenly reunited following renewed interest in their earlier recordings, including through social media, and released Highway to Heavenly in February 2026, their first album since 1996.

In 2022, twee pop experienced a revival among Gen Z on TikTok, particularly its aesthetics, which had been redeveloped in the late 2000s to early 2010s on internet sites like Tumblr as an internet aesthetic. This revival coincided with the re-emergence of indie sleaze, which helped bring about renewed interest in the original twee pop scene. Pitchfork stated that according to TikTok, twee was now "anything feminine or vaguely melancholy, and the majority of #twee videos seem unconcerned with the trend’s potential uncoolness."

In 2025, laptop twee emerged as a style of twee and indie pop coined by Canadian musician and blogger friends&. The genre has been associated with acts such as 300skullsandcounting, Bassvictim, Worldpeace DMT, Rowan Please, ear, and Cootie Catcher, the style has also encompassed digicore acts.

== Related genres ==
=== Laptop twee ===
Laptop twee is a style of twee and indie pop that emerged in the early 2020s, originally coined by the Canadian music collective friends&. Writing for Pitchfork, music journalist Kieran Press-Reynolds described laptop twee as "a slew of new artists who rewire precious twee and indie pop aesthetics with intricate sound design, fatass sleaze bass, or otherwise cracked 2020s style-shards." Music journalist Samuel Hyland described the genre as a style of "twee-indietronica." Notable acts who have been associated with the style include 300skullsandcounting, ear, Bassvictim, Worldpeace DMT, Rowan Please, Cootie Catcher and MASSI. The style has also been associated with digicore acts such as ASC's song "love quest." The genre was included in Pitchfork's list of "The Top Five Musical Rabbit Holes of 2025."
