= P.U.N.K. Girl =

EP by Heavenly
- Released: 11 July 1995
- Genre: Twee pop, indie pop
- Length: 14:12
- Label: K Records

Heavenly chronology
The Decline and Fall of Heavenly (1994)	P.U.N.K. Girl (1995)	Operation Heavenly (1996)

P.U.N.K. Girl, also known as Atta Girl in the UK, is an EP by British twee pop band Heavenly, released by K Records on 11 July 1995. In 2005, Pitchfork Media's Nitsuh Abebe wrote that it was "so bouncy and full of hooks that it can take a while to notice it's kind of a concept record about date rape." This release combines the band's 1993 singles P.U.N.K. Girl and Atta Girl, which were released on Sarah Records.

Professional ratings
Review scores
Source	Rating
AllMusic	4/5 stars
Christgau's Consumer Guide	A−
Greil Marcus	(favorable)
The New Rolling Stone Album Guide	4/5 stars

== Track listings ==
US version (K KLP 25)
No.	Title	Length
1.	"P.U.N.K. Girl"	2:55
2.	"Hearts & Crosses"	4:00
3.	"Atta Girl"	4:01
4.	"Dig Your Own Grave"	2:07
5.	"So?"	1:09
Total length:		14:12

UK version (Sarah SARAH 82 CD, also released on two separate 7-inch singles)
No.	Title	Length
1.	"Atta Girl"
2.	"P.U.N.K Girl"
3.	"Hearts & Crosses"
4.	"Dig Your Own Grave"
5.	"So?"

== Personnel ==
- Amelia Fletcher – Guitar, vocals
- Mathew Fletcher – Drums
- Peter Momtchiloff – Guitar
- Rob Pursey – Bass
- Cathy Rogers – Keyboards, vocals
- Ian Shaw – Engineer
