= Swansea Sound (band) =

British band

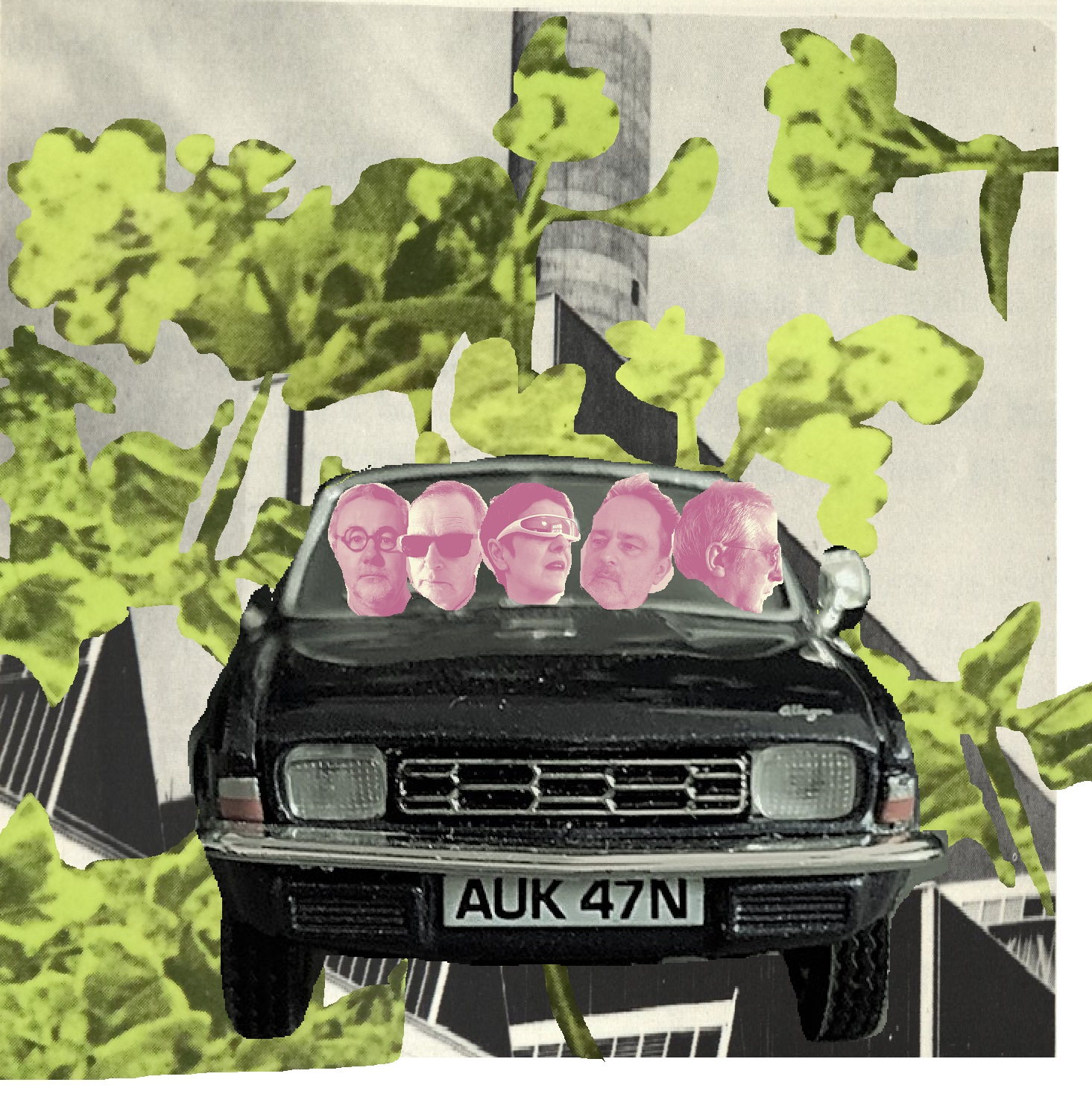

Background information
- Origin: Kent, England / Swansea, Wales
- Genres: Indie rock; indie pop; alternative rock; post-punk; jangle pop
- Years active: 2020–present
- Label: Skep Wax Records
- Spinoff of: The Pooh Sticks; Heavenly
- Members: Amelia Fletcher; Hue Williams; Rob Pursey; Ian Button; Bob Collins
- Website: http://swanseasound.bandcamp.com

Swansea Sound are an indie pop band from Kent and Swansea, formed in 2020. The group reunites Amelia Fletcher and Hue Williams, who previously sang together in 1990s indie band The Pooh Sticks. The songs are written by Rob Pursey, Fletcher's husband and long-term musical partner in Heavenly, Marine Research and Tender Trap. Ian Button, formerly of Death in Vegas and Thrashing Doves plays drums. Bob Collins, of The Dentists, plays guitar.

== History ==
The band adopted the name of the Swansea-based local radio station, Swansea Sound, in September 2020, when it was renamed Greatest Hits Radio South Wales.

Formed in 2020, during the Covid pandemic, the band only intended to release a few singles. The first four were Corporate Indie Band, I Sold My Soul on eBay, Rock n Roll Void and Indies Of The World, the latter of which entered the UK Physical Singles Top 10.

Their first album 'Live At The Rum Puncheon', released in November 2021. Reflecting on the indie pedigree of the band members, Shindig! referred to them as "indie-pop royalty," while AllMusic considered that it "felt like an indie pop dream come to life." The album was not live, nor was it recorded at the Rum Puncheon, a notorious Swansea pub which closed down in the 1980s. Instead, due to the pandemic, it was recorded by the band members themselves in their respective homes, without ever meeting each other. The album was widely reviewed positively including in Uncut and Record Collector, the latter referring to it as "packed full of hook-filled two-and-a-half-minute pop songs, offset by the underlying acerbic commentary on contemporary corporatisation and digital branding."

Around the time of the debut album's release, the relaxation of Covid rules allowed the band to meet and play live, across the UK and in Paris. Second album 'Twentieth Century', released in September 2023, was more of a band effort. It again received widespread critical acclaim, including from Mojo, Record Collector, and Louder Than War. The band recorded a live session for the Riley&Coe show on BBC Radio 6 Music.

In December 2022, the band released a single, Music Lover, using a format they had invented: a CD single inside a Christmas card. They used same format the following December for Santa Bail Me Out.

Swansea Sound's sleeve artwork is by Welsh visual artist Catrin Saran James.

== Discography ==
=== Albums ===
- Live at the Rum Puncheon (Skep Wax 005, 2021)
- Twentieth Century (Skep Wax 015, 2023)
- Pre-post-truth (2026)

== See also ==
- Talulah Gosh
- The Pooh Sticks
- Heavenly
- The Dentists
- Tender Trap
- The Catenary Wires
