= Sportique =

British indie pop band

Sportique is a British Indie pop band formed in 1997 by Gregory Webster, formerly of the Razorcuts, with Mark Flunder of the Television Personalities and Rob Pursey of Heavenly. Heavenly frontwoman Amelia Fletcher joined the group as keyboardist at the time of their second album. Sportiques music can be described as having a distinct, Buzzcocks influenced sound, utilising short live show and album length.

== Discography ==
=== Singles ===
- "If You Ever Change Your Mind"/"One For The Road" 7-inch single (Where It's At Is Where You Are Records, 1997)
- "The Kids Are Solid Gold"/"You Didn't Have To Be So Nice" 7-inch single (Roxy Records, 1998)
- "p58"/"Tiny Clues" 7-inch single (Where It's At Is Where You Are Records, 1999)
- "Love & Remains" 7" single (Matinée Records, July 1999)
- "Sport For All" 7-inch single (Where It's At Is Where You Are Records, 2000)
- "Don't Believe A Word I Say" 7-inch single (Matinée Records, September 2000)

=== LPs ===
- Black Is A Very Popular Colour cd and 10-inch (Matinée Records, April 1999)
- Modern Museums 10-inch and cd (Matinée Records, January 2002)
- Communiqué no.9 10-inch and cd (Matinée Records, April 2003)
