= Are You Scared to Get Happy? =

Are You Scared to Get Happy? was an influential 80s music fanzine published from Bristol, United Kingdom by Matt Haynes and Mark Carnell. Six issues were released between 1985 and 1987.

== Origins ==
Haynes and Carnell met as students at the University of Bristol. They were inspired to create Are You Scared to Get Happy? after reading another music-based zine, Kevin Pearce's Hungry Beat. They named their zine after lyrics from the song "Hip Hip" by the jangle pop band Hurrah!. Carnell left the publication after the release of the third issue, and Haynes continued on as the sole author.

== Publication ==
AYSTGH? was a DIY fanzine. It was created on A5-sized paper and was photocopied in colour. The zine had a vivid visual design. Its pages were saturated with a variety of bright colours — mostly red, blue, green, yellow, and purple. Both handwritten and type-written strips of text could be seen on the zine. The font styles included typewriter text and graffiti-style scrawlings. The zine utilized a collage-esque format of organization, interspersing colourful images and illustrations throughout the passages of text. The illustrations in the zine were done by a woman named Elaine.

As the zine was DIY, AYSTGH? was also self-published. Copies were often sold at music gigs, but were later sold at Revolver and Record Collector in Sheffield as well. Six issues in total were created and published between the years 1985 and 1987.

It concentrated on what would now be termed twee pop bands, and was notable for its hardline approach to the independent ethic and its expansive, lyrical writing style.

== Content ==
AYSTGH? was made up of essays detailing the creators' opinions on various twee pop bands and songs. The zine predominantly focused on up-and-coming indie-pop bands, rather than those that had mainstream representation. Some of the bands/artists featured in the zine were:

- Hurrah!
- Jasmine Minks
- Microdisney
- Biff Bang Pow!
- Julian Cope
- Primal Scream
- St. Christopher
- June Brides

Throughout their essays, the creators would also relate the music to their thoughts and experiences regarding relationships, politics, capitalism, and other social topics. However, AYSTGH? was regarded as part of the "cutie" period, in which the indie genre focused less on politics and more on the music. The zine wasn't entirely apolitical, but it didn't lean as passionately into politics as some of its punk-era predecessors did.

== Influence ==
AYSTGH? has been described as "the most canonical indie-pop fanzine." AYSTGH? is also credited with carving out the aesthetics that would help codify 1980s indie-pop as a genre. The zine played a part in the initial blossoming of the indie-pop movement, more so than the corporate record labels, who caught on to the movement later. Many subsequent fanzines were influenced by AYSTGH?, and it was also a key influence on record labels such as Unpopular. Fanzines that have cited AYSTGH? as an influence include 373 Miles is a Very Long Way (1987), Disposable but Happy (1988), and Woosh (late 1980s). AYSTGH? set a trend in indie-pop fanzines by including flexi-discs. These had some of the earliest releases by bands such as Baby Lemonade, Remember Fun, The Clouds, The Bachelor Pad, Razorcuts, Talulah Gosh, The Siddeleys and Reserve, and several of the early Sarah Records bands. The series of flexi-discs – released on the Sha-La-La label – were shared across several fanzines operating at the time. Initially, these were Simply Thrilled, Baby Honey, and Trout Fishing In Leytonstone, and subsequently fanzines in Japan and Germany. Ultimately, 8 flexi-discs were released through Sha-La-La, and each disc sold over 2,000 copies.

After publication of the zine stopped, Haynes went on to found the independent record label Sarah Records with fellow zinester Clare Wadd. The publication of AYSTGH? significantly influenced the creation of Sarah Records. Sarah provided a platform for young indie bands to share their music without the help of corporate labels, which was an idea present throughout AYSTGH? Haynes and Wadds, both zinesters, imbued Sarah Records with the "spirit of the fanzine," even creating Sarah zines and releasing them along with the records.
