= Parallel Horizontal =

Single by Marine Research

from the album Sounds from the Gulf Stream
- Released: 27 July 1999
- Label: (United Kingdom) K Records
- Producer(s): Roger Tebbutt (A-side), Mike Engles (B-sides)

Marine Research singles chronology
"Queen B" (1998)	"Parallel Horizontal" (1999)	"Sick and Wrong" (1999)

"Parallel Horizontal" is a song by the indie pop band Marine Research. It first appeared as a single on 27 July 1999 and then as the opening track on their only album Sounds from the Gulf Stream on 24 August.

Its two B-sides were recorded for John Peel's Radio 1 show in May 1999. Neither song featured on Sounds from the Gulf Stream and so were exclusive to this release. Amelia Fletcher and Peter Momtchiloff had first recorded a session for Peel in 1987 when they were members of Talulah Gosh.

A music video was made for the song.

"Parallel Horizontal" garnered several positive reviews. Paul Connolly in The Times described it as "Perfect sunny day pop music", while Dale Kattack in Nightshift wrote: "it's fantastically merry and uncomplicated but for all its sweetness there's barely a trace of tweeness to be heard". Stevie Chick in the NME described "Angel in the Snow" as "four minutes of icy-cool girl group incandescence".

== Track listing ==
1. "Parallel Horizontal"
2. "Angel in the Snow"
3. "I Confess"
- Tracks 2 and 3 were recorded for the BBC Radio 1 John Peel show and first transmitted on 18 May 1999.
