= They've Scoffed the Lot =

Live album by Talulah Gosh
- Released: March? 1991
- Genre: Indie pop, twee pop
- Label: Sarah Records
- Producer: Barry Andrews, Dale Griffin

Talulah Gosh chronology
Rock Legends : Volume 69 (1987)	They've Scoffed the Lot (1991)	Talulah Mania (1991)

Professional ratings
Review scores
Source	Rating
Allmusic	4/5 stars

They've Scoffed the Lot is a compilation of radio session recordings by the indie pop band Talulah Gosh.

== Release ==
Scoffed was issued in 1991 by the independent label Sarah Records, which at the time had recently signed Heavenly, a band formed from four of the five members of Talulah Gosh. The catalogue number was SARAH 604.

Each side featured a whole Radio 1 session. The first was recorded for the Janice Long show and broadcast on 7 August 1986, and the second was done for John Peel's show and transmitted on 11 January 1988.

Apart from the brief period when future Heavenly member Rob Pursey was in the group, They've Scoffed the Lot represented the different line-ups of Talulah Gosh; Elizabeth Price appears on the first session and Eithne Farry on the second.

The entirety of this compilation was included on the 1996 anthology Backwash.

== Track listing ==
=== Side one ===
1. "Talulah Gosh" Mathew
2. "Do You Remember" Amelia
3. "Looking for a Rainbow" Elizabeth
4. "Sunny Inside" Amelia

=== Side two ===
1. "My World's Ending" Peter
2. "Be Your Baby" Amelia
3. "Break Your Face" Mathew
4. "In Love for the Very First Time" Gregory
5. "Spearmint Head" Mathew

== Credits ==
Talulah Gosh was

- Chris Scott - bass
- Peter Momtchiloff - guitar
- Amelia Fletcher - vocals and guitar
- Mathew Fletcher - drums
- Elizabeth Price - vocals and guitar (side one)
- Eithne Farry - vocals (side two)

Side one produced by Barry Andrews and engineered by Martyn Parker
Originally broadcast on the Janice Long show, 7.8.86
Side two produced by Dale Griffin and engineered by Mike Engles and Paul Long
Originally broadcast on the John Peel show, 11.1.88

== Note ==
The line "They're back! back!! back!!!" is etched into the matrix of the first side; "....except they're not!" is written on the second.
