= Heavenly vs. Satan =

Studio album by Heavenly
- Released: January 1991
- Recorded: 1990 by Richard Haines at Dungeon Studios, Chipping Norton
- Genre: Twee pop
- Length: 32:11
- Label: Sarah Records

Heavenly chronology
Heavenly vs. Satan (1991)	Le Jardin de Heavenly (1992)

Professional ratings
Review scores
Source	Rating
AllMusic	4/5 stars
Pitchfork	8.5/10
Q Magazine	2/5 stars

Heavenly vs. Satan is the debut studio album by British twee pop band Heavenly. It was released by Sarah Records in January 1991, as SARAH 603 (see Sarah Records catalogue). No producer is listed in the sleevenotes, although Richard Haines is credited with engineering.

At this stage Heavenly were a four-piece (see the Heavenly article for a photograph); Cathy Rogers would join the band in the summer of 1991.

The album was reissued by K Records in 2001 with a different cover and six bonus tracks: each side of their first and second Sarah singles; and their fourth single, originally issued by K. Cathy Rogers appears on some of the extra tracks, and is credited with the other members in the booklet.

AllMusic describes Heavenly vs. Satan as "a remarkable maturation of Talulah Gosh's old manic guitar strum" although "considerably less sophisticated than Heavenly's later albums would become". Dave Henderson of Q Magazine described the album as "winsome and alluring but never quite manages to convince".

== Track listing ==
1. "Cool Guitar Boy"
2. "Boyfriend Stays the Same"
3. "Lemonhead Boy"
4. "Shallow"
5. "Wish Me Gone"
6. "Don't Be Fooled"
7. "It's You"
8. "Stop Before You Say It"

=== Bonus tracks ===
1. "I Fell in Love Last Night"
2. "Over and Over"
3. "Our Love Is Heavenly"
4. "Wrap My Arms Around Him"
5. "She Says"
6. "Escort Crash on Marston Street"
