= Elizabeth Price (artist) =

British artist (born 1966)

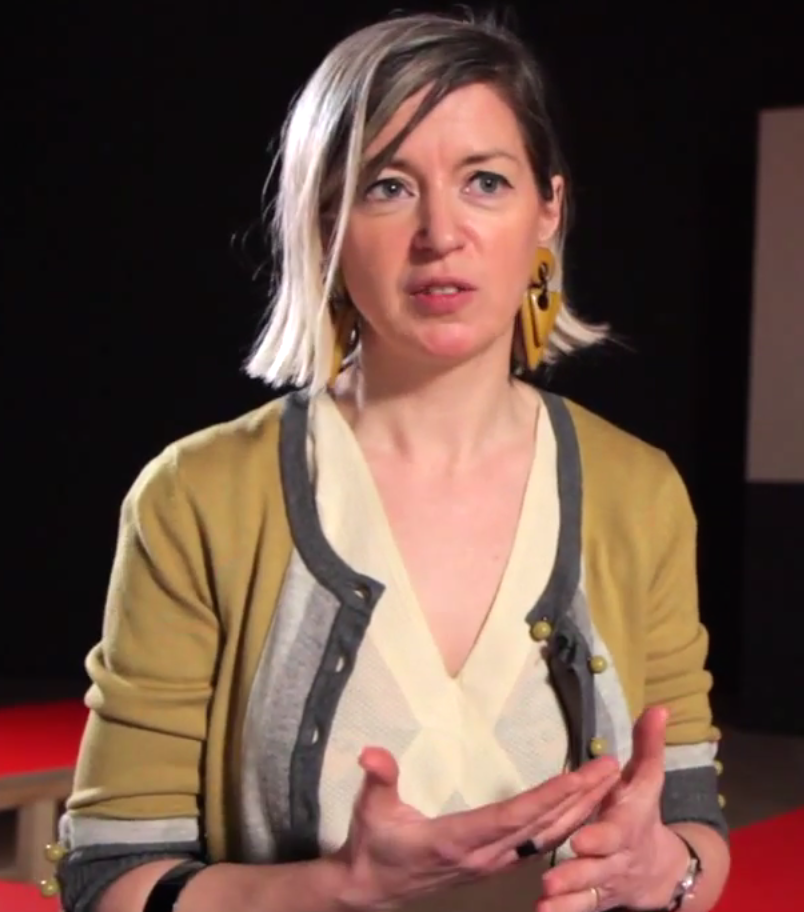
- Born: 6 November 1966 (age 60); Bradford, West Yorkshire
- Education: The Ruskin School of Drawing and Fine Art; Royal College of Art; University of Leeds
- Known for: Video art, Installation art
- Notable work: The Woolworths Choir of 1979, The User Group Disco
- Awards: 2012 Turner Prize

Elizabeth Price (born 6 November 1966) is a British contemporary artist working primarily in digital moving image who won the Turner Prize in 2012. She is known for short films which explore the social and political histories of artefacts, architectures and documents. She is a former member of indie pop bands Talulah Gosh and The Carousel. She is currently Professor of Film and Photography at Kingston University.

== Biography ==
Price was born in Bradford, West Yorkshire. She was raised in Luton and studied at Putteridge High School before moving on to The Ruskin School of Drawing and Fine Art at the University of Oxford as a member of Jesus College. She continued her studies at the Royal College of Art in London, where she completed her MFA, and in 1999 she received her PhD in Fine Art from the University of Leeds.

In 2005 Price was awarded a Stanley Picker Fellowship at Kingston University, London. In 2012 Price was in residence at Wysing Arts Centre. In 2012 (until 2013) she became the first artist-in-residence at the Rutherford Appleton Space Laboratory in Oxfordshire.

In 2011 Price was awarded Arts Council England Helen Chadwick Fellowship at the University of Oxford and British School at Rome, where she realized The Woolworths Choir of 1979. The video was shown at Baltic Centre for Contemporary Art, Gateshead in 2012, in a solo presentation at Motinternational, London the same year and at Tate Britain, in the Turner Prize exhibition, which Price won.

Price was nominated for the 2012 Turner Prize for her solo exhibition 'HERE' at the Baltic Centre for Contemporary Art in Gateshead, where three video works were displayed: User Group Disco (2009), The Choir (2012) and West Hinder (2012). The 2012 Turner Prize exhibition at Tate Britain featured her twenty-minute video installation The Woolworths Choir of 1979 (which includes elements from The Choir), for which she was awarded the prize on 3 December 2012. The Guardian art critic declared the "focus and drive of Price's work, the cutting and the atmosphere, mark her out".

Price says her videos take a year to make. She explained "I use digital video to try and explore the divergent forces that are at play when you bring so many different technological histories together... I’m interested in the medium of video as something you experience sensually as well as something you might recognize."

Prior to working as an artist, Price was a founding member, singer, guitarist and songwriter of Indie band Talulah Gosh, known for a series of successful indie singles released on the Scottish label 53rd&3rd, as well as BBC Janice Long and John Peel sessions. She subsequently made several records with Gregory Webster, guitarist, singer and songwriter of the Razorcuts, under the name of The Carousel. ‘I forgot to remember to forget’ was initially released on Price and Webster’s short-lived record label ‘Cosmic English Music in 1990 and re-released by Vinyl Japan along with a subsequent LP ‘abcdefghijklmnopqrstuvwxyz’ in 1994. Price was also a founding member of the never recorded, all girl group ‘The Katherines of Arrogance’ which included Amelia Fletcher and Eithne Farry of Talulah Gosh along with Jo Johnson (subsequently) of riot grrrl band Huggy Bear.

=== Art career ===
While Price's art emerged from conceptualism, institutional critique and an interest in social histories, archives and collections, her video-work is a radical departure from the visual styles and rhetorics usually associated with these movements and subject matters. Part of this can be attributed to Price’s view that the established visual modes of critical art had become moribund, and were exercises in deferent revivalism; but also because the digital was rapidly and profoundly altering how we encounter historical knowledge. Reviews and essays about her work expand upon both of these aspects:

'We…feel something emergent, anxious and fairly wild in Price's art: a poetics of disappearance and return. History in the form of the cached past is positioned here as animate, a collective unconscious subject to repression and warped comebacks.'

A critic wrote that Price's work examines the viewer's involvement in the contemporary at world and the social, aesthetic, and institutional forces that shape interpretation.

'In an era of social amnesia and disputed histories, Price’s attention to dismantling and rebuilding the collective memory is dissident, exhilarating and necessary.'

‘Price’s work induces… sensations of not only being inside a space or pictorial illusion, but of being in entire systems of thoughts and ideas that are forming and acting in the present tense.’

== Notable works ==
=== At The House of Mr X (2007) ===
Single-channel video, 20 minutes duration

At The House of Mr X takes as its subject the preserved modernist home, and art/design collections of a deceased cosmetics mogul. It opens as a visit to the house, proceeding from the entrance through open-plan areas, into every room. The elegant geometry of the spaces, the varied materials of the architecture, and the luxurious modernist furnishings are all attentively documented. The narration - which is provided as a silent, on-screen rolling graphic is derived from various archival materials associated with the history of the house, including architectural specifications; curatorial inventories and the point-of-sale literature for various cosmetics products. As the tour moves through the house, the narration migrates through these sources so that in the final stages, the house and its art collection is described using the vocabulary of 1960s/1970s cosmetics, incorporating the puns and innuendo that hint at gender, sexual and social transformation or fluidity.

In Frieze magazine, Sam Thorne wrote "The measured tones of the archivist are mixed with the fanciful lures of make-up adverts. Flashing over lascivious interior shots, a story of sensual inhabitation is developed as these cosmetics product descriptions - 'Jacobean shade', 'soft-centre candy floss’, 'starkers glow' - are gradually applied to the polished finishes of the house itself, as though it were a face. In the final section, following these transformative temptations of 'pearlise' and 'time-machinery', the viewer is invited to physically blend themselves with the liquid veneers of the house: 'Make silvery gold & viscous trails / A delightful decor/ of lustrous puddles[ ... ] To bloom on the lovely surface." Price refers to this as a ‘profane denouement', a transgression of the domestic ideal in that the house itself seems to have quickened into life and 'inhabits' the guest.'

At The House of Mr X has been exhibited at The Stanley Picker Gallery, London in 2007 - at Hå Gamle Prestegard, Norway; Museum of Contemporary Art & Design Manila, Philippines and Julia Stoschek Foundation, Dusseldorf Germany in 2014 - at the Carpenter Center for the Visual Arts, Harvard University, Cambridge, Massachusetts, US in 2015 - at the Whitworth Gallery, Manchester, UK in 2019.

=== User Group Disco (2009) ===
Single-channel video, 20 minutes duration

Redundant consumer artefacts of the late twentieth century are both glamorously featured and satirically analysed in the video User Group Disco. Cheap but extraordinarily decadent artefacts such as pet-food dispensers and necktie-storage systems are rotated, suspended and animated in front of the camera, whilst a series of quotes taken from theoretical texts on art, corporate management and taxonomy, as well as excerpts from gothic and magic-realist literature are cut together to imagine the creation and inauguration of a museum to hold them.

In an ArtReview profile (2010), JJ Charlesworth describes this "One moment didactic, then cryptic, then exclamatory, the streaming over-titles of Price’s videos veer from critical meditation on the politics of art, the history of modernity and the corrupt logic of taxonomy, into passages of apocalyptic, hallucinated exuberance, in which Price’s fetishised, spinning objects – cappuccino frothers, electric wine coolers, executive toys, seventies ceramics – accelerate into a frenzy of anachronistic consumer desire…." Tamara Trodd makes similar observations in an Art History essay (2019): "By materialising the idea of the objects possessing a hidden life, and having them appear to dance, Price’s playful anthropomorphism conjures up exhilarated responses in us. Even as we are made to realise and to fear the forces that slumber in material objects, somehow we are also made to laugh at them."

User Group Disco has been exhibited at Spike Island in 2009; at the Hayward Gallery, London, UK; Nottingham Contemporary, Nottingham, UK; Tramway, Glasgow, Scotland, UK; Plymouth Art Centre, Plymouth, UK; and Pavilion, Leeds, UK in 2010; at the Baltic, Newcastle, UK in 2012; at the Scottish National Gallery of Modern Art, Edinburgh, Scotland, UK in 2013; at the Power Plant, Toronto, Canada and Hå Gamle Prestegard, Norway in 2014; at Turku Art Museum, Finland and Hessel Museum of Art, New York, 2015; - at the Model, Sligo, Ireland 2016; at Cast, Helston, UK, and the Musee Nationale Fernande Leger, Nice, France, 2022.

=== The Woolworths Choir of 1979 (2012) ===
Single-channel video, 13 minutes duration

The Woolworths Choir of 1979 combines, in three well-differentiated parts, a syncopated succession of archive material in an apparently dissonant composition: a textual-visual research into the architectural typology of British Gothic church choirs; fragments of videos culled from internet showing backing vocalists for pop groups; and TV news footage of a fire in the furniture department at Woolworths in Manchester in 1979, in which 10 employees lost their lives…

A step-by-step guide to ecclesiastical architecture, illustrated by archival photographs, diagrams and arcane terminology is gradually interrupted by distorted footage of the sinuous movements of various girl bands, like ghostly apparitions from another world. Echoing this visual transition, the soundtrack segues from isolated, stark finger clicks and handclaps to the explosive and emotive chorus of The Shangri-Las' Out in the Streets. The handclaps return to accompany the final chapter which draws on news footage and witness accounts of a notorious fire in the furniture stockroom of the Manchester branch of Woolworths in 1979. The cyclic repetition accentuates the point of contingency between the three stories: the twisted wrist. But it also accentuates the condition of the body of knowledge of each one of the parts like a social body united through a gesture that becomes radical.

The Woolworths Choir of 1979 is a 20-minute film whose three segments are linked by recurring images of hand gestures and the tight percussive sound of sharp finger-clicking. The hands of trapped victims of a 1979 fire in a Woolworths store in Manchester, helplessly flapping from a window filled with billowing smoke, are juxtaposed with the expressive hand gesturing of singers.

This work of experimental historiography represents the calibrated challenges. Moreover, it is a manifesto against orthodox delivery systems of information and knowledge.

The Woolworths Choir of 1979 has been exhibited at The Whitworth, Manchester, UK and Centro De Arte Dos De Mayo, Madrid, Spain in 2019 - at Tate Britain, London, UK in 2018 - at Vancouver Art Gallery, British Columbia, Canada in 2016 - at The Model, Sligo, Ireland, Neuer Berliner Kunstverein, Berlin, Germany and Doris McCarthy Gallery, Toronto, Canada in 2015 - at The Julia Stoschek Foundation, Dusseldorf, Germany, Franz Hals Museum, Haarlem, The Netherlands and the Station Gallery, Tokyo in 2014 - at Musee D’art Contemporain, Montreal, Canada in 2013 - at Baltic Centre for Contemporary Art, Gateshead, UK, Bielefelder Kunstverein, Berlin, Germany, MOT International, London, UK and Tate Britain, London.

A previous version of the work CHOIR was exhibited at Chisenhale Gallery, London, UK, New Museum, New York, USA and Collective Gallery Edinburgh.

=== A Restoration (2016) ===
Two-channel video, 18 minutes 30 seconds duration

A Restoration is narrated by an ambiguous "we," an undefined group of administrators. This "we" is a common thread in Price’s videos; the we of her earlier User Group Disco (2009) is the human resources department of an undefined museum of twentieth-century refuse, serving as mouthpieces for the theories of Theodor Adorno and management expert Henry Mintzberg. In A Restoration, they are tasked with organising the digital records of Arthur Evans’s excavation of Knossos and materials from Pitt Rivers curator Henry Balfour’s photographic archives—projects that retrospectively stand out for perhaps more for their imagination rather than a fidelity to material evidence. These narrators begin to extort the project’s "ribald energy... to cultivate a further germination" of the files. The project devolves from organizational drudgery into an expressive intervention shattering the logic of museology and historical taxonomy.

It bears the stylistic hallmarks of Price’s video work: digitized archival footage and CGI form a visual montage narrated through text and sometimes a computerized voice, usually coded to sound female. The accumulation of information and text starts to bend the source material into a speculative fantasy, undermining the assumed logic of said source material. Text, sound, and image unite to make a mess of our past, and the editing lends a rhythm, invoking a new energy—alluring, mournful, anarchic. Price’s concerns are, broadly, material culture and ideologies of the recent past, and her engagement with text and image is rooted in Conceptual art. While subsequent generations of artists working in this vein have debunked the "mute presence" of language, Price has sussed out the class leanings of Conceptual art’s relation to language and its forms (especially typing) through the suggestion of social status through her narrative choruses.

A Restoration has been exhibited at The Ashmolean Museum, Oxford, UK in 2016 - at the Art Institute, Chicago, US and the Institute of the Ancient World, New York, US in 2017 - at the Adam Art Gallery, Wellington, New Zealand in 2018 - at the Site Gallery, Sheffield, UK and The Model, Sligo, Ireland in 2019 - at The Ashmolean, Oxford, UK and the Schirn Kunsthalle, Frankfurt, Germany in 2023.

=== UNDERFOOT (2023) ===
Two-channel video, 14 minutes

Affective attachment to the idiosyncrasies of public space, particularly public libraries, is an abiding interest for Price. In conversation with Dominic Paterson, the Hunterian’s curator of contemporary art, she described her own emotional entanglement with the library in general, which dates to her childhood, as something deeply invested in their status as civic buildings, as something exemplary of the generosity of the state: a place to read books and listen to records, for free. Libraries are, of course, also places where people work. The library in UNDERFOOT, seen as it is from carpet level, can be understood as a record of intersecting kinds of labour, incorporating images of factory workers using Axminster carpet looms, as well as digital considerations of, in Price’s words, ‘the shared technical histories of woven textile and computing’.

Price's work looks at different stage of image production, including digital rendering of textile designs and how they are made. The video moves from close view of the materials to the industrial setting, including the loom, scanning processes and the workers (almost always women) who operate them. In the final part of the video, the focus shifts toward the machinery above the workers, forming the composition that contrasts repetition and absence.

In Price’s practice there is a sense of threat that does not seem to relate to the future of technology, but rather to the past. Through her research into archival erasures and omissions, and the methodologies in which things – tangible and not – are recorded, she acts as a sort of anachronistic interlocutor. In her film-making, she appears to speak from the perspective of that which we have discarded, missed, misused or moved on from. It is an unsettling, radical realm, where absences are given substance, learn how to communicate and threaten to spill out from the screen.

UNDERFOOT has been exhibited at the Hunterian Gallery, Glasgow in 2022 - at the Schirn Kunsthalle, Frankfurt, Germany in 2023.

== See also ==
- List of Turner Prize winners and nominees
