= Carpool (disambiguation) =

Carpooling is the sharing of automobile journeys. Carpool may also refer to:

- Carpool (1983 film), a 1983 comedy film
- Carpool (1996 film), a 1996 film
- Carpool (web series), Robert Llewellyn's online interview series
  - Carpool (TV series), a TV spin-off of the web series
- Carpoolers, an American comedy series
