= Backwash =

Backwash may refer to:

== Physical phenomena ==
- Backwash (physical phenomenon), also known as "swash", the backwards flow of air or water
- A mixture of beverage and saliva that has flowed back into a drinking vessel
- Backwash ileitis, the involvement of the terminal part of the ileum in ulcerative colitis, following the ascent of the condition from the rectum
- Backwashing (water treatment), the process of thoroughly cleaning a pool filter pump by reversing the flow of water through it with the dirt and rinse water going to waste

== Arts, entertainment, and media ==
- Backwash (album), a retrospective compilation by the group Talulah Gosh
- "Backwash" (The Wire), a 2003 episode of the HBO television series The Wire
- Backwash squeeze, a type of squeeze play in bridge
- Backxwash, Zambian-Canadian rapper and producer

== See also ==
- Mouthwash
