= Would-Be-Goods =

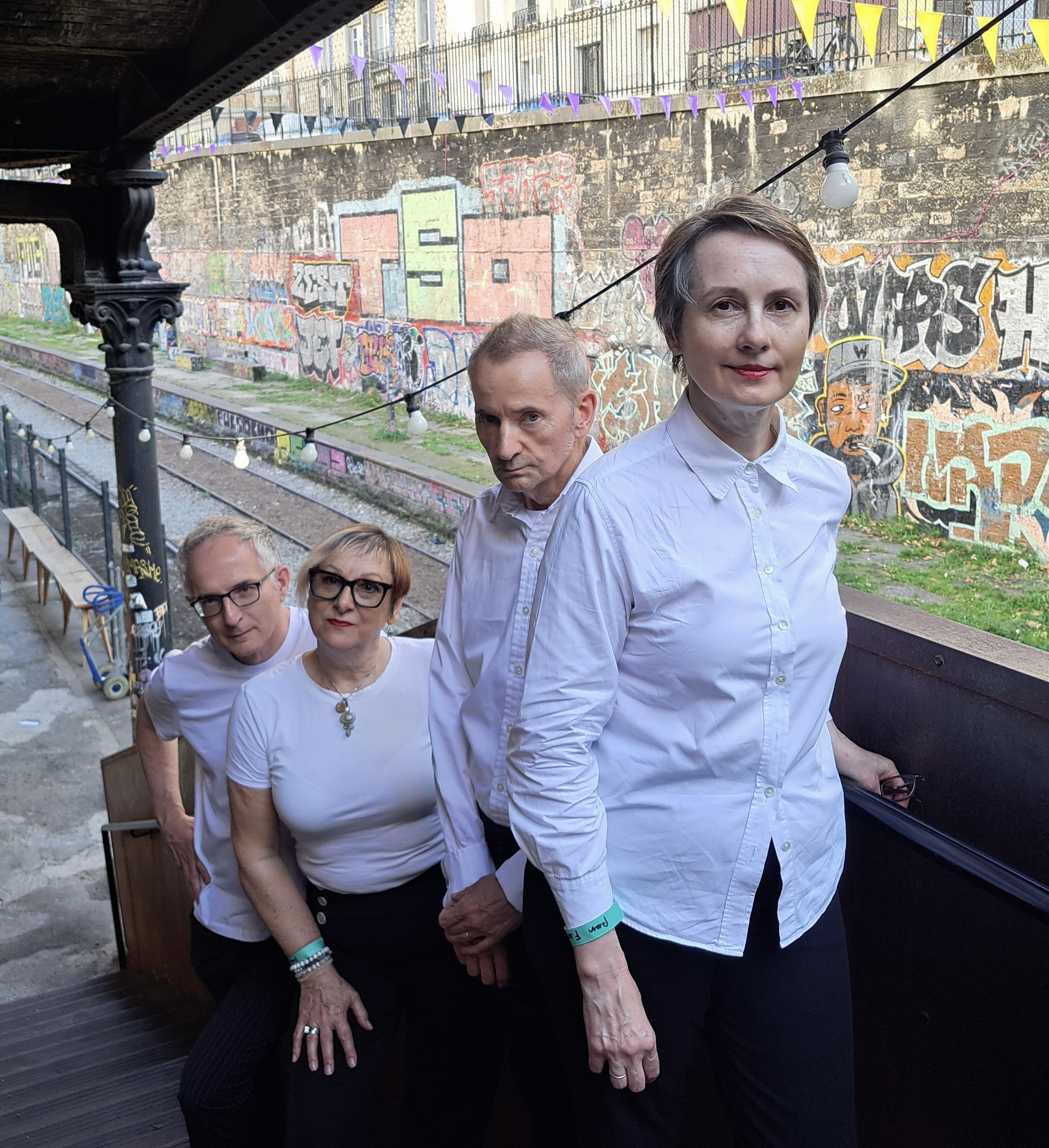
- Would-Be-Goods, Le Hasard Ludique, Paris, 2025

Background information
- Origin: United Kingdom
- Genre: Indie pop
- Years active: 1987–present
- Website: would-be-goods.bandcamp.com

Would-Be-Goods are a British indie pop band fronted by singer and songwriter Jessica Griffin, noted for her precise received pronunciation accent when singing. Their name was inspired by the 1901 novel The Wouldbegoods, by children's author E. Nesbit

== Career ==
On her first album, released on the él label, Griffin had no band of her own, and was backed by members of The Monochrome Set. The Camera Loves Me was critically acclaimed in the UK and Japan. In 1992 Griffin worked with the Monochrome Set on a second album, Mondo, produced by Monochrome Set singer Bid and released in 1993 on the Japanese label Polystar. Mondo was later released in the UK on the Cherry Red label.

Peter Momtchiloff, formerly of Talulah Gosh, Heavenly, Marine Research and Scarlet's Well, joined the band as lead guitarist and bassist in 1999. Two EPs, Emmanuelle Béart and Sugar Mummy, were released in 2001, followed by a new album, Brief Lives, a joint release by US label Matinée Recordings and UK-based Fortuna Pop!. Griffin and Momtchiloff began performing live as a duo and soon afterwards two new members joined the band: Deborah Green (now Greensmith, former member of Thee Headcoatees) on drums and Lupe Nuñez-Fernandez on bass. After the band recorded a fourth album, The Morning After, in 2004, Nuñez-Fernandez left to focus on her own band, Pipas, and was replaced by Andy Warren (Adam and the Ants and The Monochrome Set). Would-Be-Goods' fifth album, Eventyr, was released in November 2008.

In October 2020 Griffin began writing and recording a song a day, with a new title (but no other guidance) provided the previous evening by her partner and bandmate Momtchiloff. Twenty of the songs were released on Bandcamp (as four five-song EPs) in 2021, and later compiled on a CD, The Night Life, in 2023.

In February 2026 the band released their sixth studio album, Tears Before Bedtime, on Skep Wax Records.

Would-Be-Goods have performed live in the United States, Spain, Sweden, Finland, Denmark and France as well as the UK.

== Discography ==
=== Singles and EPs ===
- "Fruit Paradise" / "Hanging Gardens of Reigate" (7-inch single, él Records, 1987)
- "The Camera Loves Me" / "Cecil Beaton's Scrapbook" (7-inch single, él Records, 1988)
- Emmanuelle Béart: "Emmanuelle Béart" / "Je lèche les vitrines" / "Everybody Wants My Baby" / "Words" (four-track EP, Matinee Recordings, 2001)
- Sugar Mummy: "Sugar Mummy" / "Spanish Tragedy" / "Perfect Dear" (7-inch EP single, Fortuna Pop! Records, 2001)
- From The Depths: "Rafferty" / "Bats In The Belfry" / "The Wind Will Change" / "Cavanagh, Cody and Byrne" / "Ouija Board Romance" (five-track digital EP, Bandcamp, 2021)
- Spring Fever: "Charm School" / "The King Of The Moon" / "Temporary Arrangement" / "The Kiss Of Death" / "There's A Star On My Dressing-Room Door" (five-track digital EP, Bandcamp, 2021)
- The Violet Hour: "The Love Parade" / "The Night Life" / "Born Bad" / "Wild West" / "It's Such A Shame About Susie" (five-track digital EP, Bandcamp, 2021)
- Saturn's Child: "Saturn's Child" / "Foreign Affairs" / "Madame X" / "I've Forgotten Him Now" / "Goodbye To All That" (five-track digital EP, Bandcamp, 2021)

=== Albums ===
- The Camera Loves Me (LP and CD, él Records/Cherry Red, 1988; re-released with bonus tracks in 1999 and 2003)
- Mondo (CD, Polystar, 1993)
- Brief Lives (CD, Matinee Recordings and Fortuna Pop! Records, 2002)
- The Morning After (CD, Matinee Recordings and Fortuna Pop! Records, 2004)
- Eventyr (CD, Matinee Recordings, 2008)
- The Night Life (CD, self-released, 2023)
- Tears Before Bedtime (LP and CD, Skep Wax Records, 2026)
