= Full Metal Challenge =

2003 British television series

- Starring: Cathy Rogers Henry Rollins
- Country of origin: United Kingdom
- No. of series: 1
- No. of episodes: 13

Production
- Production location: Richborough Power Station
- Running time: 1 hour 60mins (inc. comms)

Original release
- Network: Channel 4
- Release: 6 April – 6 July 2003

Full Metal Challenge was a television series made by RDF Media for Channel 4 in the UK and the Learning Channel in the United States. It ran for one season from 2002 to 2003. Hosted by series creator Cathy Rogers and Henry Rollins, the show was very similar to Rogers' last show, Scrapheap Challenge. It was filmed in the United Kingdom with a budget of approx £6.5 million on location at the disused Richborough Power Station just outside Sandwich in Kent.

== Premise ==
Twenty-seven teams from around the world compete in the challenge. Each team consists of 3 people. The teams were all given 1 month and $3000 USD (exchanged to their country's respective currency) to build a vehicle that "could withstand anything." Teams did not know ahead of time exactly what the events would be and how they would work. Periodically during the build, a technical advisor would visit the teams to make sure the vehicles would pass safety regulations and to make sure they stayed legal for the tournament. They were also required to be no heavier than 3 tons and/or wider than 8 feet (for the hall of mirrors). Cars ended up being loud, noisy, big, and destructive (qualities relished by the show's co-host, Henry Rollins).

In each show, 3 machines competed. In the first round, there were 9 heats, each of which involved one machine from the United Kingdom, one from North America, and one from another country (Chile, India, Australia, China, Iceland, Germany, Russia, South Africa and New Zealand). The team that won a challenge got 3 points, placed 2nd got 2, and 3rd placed got 1, with a failure to finish worth 0 points and a tie worth half a point. After the 3rd challenge, the machine with the lowest score was "incinerated" and the top 2 progressed to the Sumo round.

== Results ==
Episode 1: Chile - 9, United States - 6, UK - 3 | Sumo Final - Chile d. United States via Knockout

Episode 2: United States - 7, UK - 6, India - 5 | Sumo Final - United States d. UK via Technical Knockout

Episode 3: United States - 8, Australia - 5.5, UK - 4.5 | Sumo Final - Australia d. United States via Knockout

Episode 4: United States - 8, China - 5, UK - 2 | Sumo Final - China d. United States via Technical Knockout

Episode 5: United States - 8, UK - 6, South Africa - 4 | Sumo Final - UK d. United States via Decision

Episode 6: Canada - 7, Germany - 6, UK 5 | Sumo Final - Canada d. Germany via Knockout

Episode 7: Iceland - 7, United States - 6, UK - 5 | Sumo Final - Iceland d. United States via Ring Out

Episode 8: UK - 9, Russia - 5, United States - 4 | Sumo Final - UK d. Russia via Ring Out

Episode 9: New Zealand - 8.5, Scotland - 4.5, United States - 2 | Sumo Final - New Zealand d. Scotland via Technical Knockout

Episode 10: UK - 8, Australia - 6, China - 4 | Sumo Final - UK d. Australia via Ring Out

Episode 11: Canada - 7, UK - 6, New Zealand - 5 | Sumo Final - Canada d. UK via Knockout

Episode 12: Iceland - 8, Chile - 7, United States - 3 | Sumo Final - Chile d. Iceland via Decision

Episode 13: UK - 8, Canada - 6, Chile - 4 | Sumo Final - UK d. Canada via Knockout

== Tournament play ==
The vehicles competed in a series of events, with each episode showing the competition between 3 vehicles. After the events, the teams each received points based on their performance, usually 3 for 1st place, 2 for 2nd place, 1 for 3rd place, though contestants could score 0 points for not completing a course, or share points if they got the same score). After all the events were complete, the team with the lowest score had to watch their car blow up, though it was feigned for effect. The two winning teams faced off in a sumo wrestling match. The winner of Sumo advanced to the next round of the tournament.

== Events ==
=== Preliminary ===
Each episode featured three of the following events. Teams were awarded 3 points for first place, 2 for second, 1 for third and none for failing to finish an event. In the event of a tie, the points for the two places are averaged and divided equally (i.e. a tie for second results in 1.5 points per team).

- 10 Pin

Cars start at the end of a soap slicked path with 10 pins at the other end, each weighing 150 lbs. Each team is given 2 trials to knock down as many pins as possible. Pins knocked over in the first trial are removed from play for the second trial. Each match of the first round features this game first.

- Pitball

In this game, all three teams start in the center of a crater-like dirt pit. Positioned facing away from the center, a giant wireframe soccer ball with flaming core is rolled into the center of the pit and before coming to rest, a signal sounding the beginning of the game sounds. The first team to push the ball out of the pit wins the game. Afterwards, the game is reset for the remaining two teams to settle second and third. If a car goes over the lip of the pit in the process of scoring a goal, a foul is called and the cars are put back into starting position. For the final, posts were added marking a goal and in order for the goal to count, teams had to push the ball in any one of the 3 goals.

- Hall of Mirrors

Teams begin on the outside of a giant hexagon maze with reflective walls and attempt to drive to the center marked by the FMC logo. Once green flagged, they must find the quickest route out of the maze entirely. First team to clear the maze wins. Finding a clear path can prove difficult as some walls are allowed to rotate, changing the layout of the maze. Teams are allowed to watch a monitor with an overhead look at the maze and can communicate directions to the driving teammate.

- Bumper Cars

All three teams begin in a soapslicked area and proceed to run into beacons scattered around the play area. Teams score points depending on the beacon hit and after contact, render the beacon out of play for 35 seconds. This information was kept hidden from teams but they were aware that only lit beacons counted for points. After 5 minutes, teams scores were tallied and event points awarded accordingly.

- Rollercoaster

One at a time, teams drive their vehicle around a course that includes two 50 foot high teeters, a tricky 3-way teeter, a 30-degree inverted bank and multiple bumps along the way. Teams try to complete the course in as little time as possible. For each time a car falls off the edge of the track, a 20-second penalty is assessed.

- Wetropolis

Teams start at the edge of a field flooded with 3 feet of water. Teams maneuver to red hydrants scattered around the course and in order to continue, the car must complete a 360-degree turn in reverse around it. After all the hydrants had been circled, the team drives back to the start in order to stop the clock. Ten seconds are assessed in penalties for failing to complete a circle or for knocking signs or people over, fastest time wins the event.

- King of the Hill

Teams start amongst 7 mounds, each with a sign at the top. Three of the mounds are assigned solely to one team, three more are assigned as shared between two teams and the last mound shared by all three teams. After the start, teams must knock over two of the three signs set up around the center mound with their cars. Signs shared by teams can be knocked over by either of the two teams assigned to it. Once a team has two of the signs on the outer ring knocked over, they then attempt the center mound. Because signs are shared, it is entirely possible for a team to be eliminated if both of their shared signs are claimed by the other teams. Once a team has finished, the other two are allowed to start from where they left off to attempt to complete the center mound. If teams cannot finish and it results in a tie, whoever climbed up the hill closest to the center sign wins. This event was always played as the first event of the semifinal round.

- Grand International

Teams are lined up at the start and must complete two laps of the course, covered in multiple jumps, ponds, and hay bale walls. First to finish wins. This event was only played as the first event of the final round.

=== Finish games ===
- Sumo

After the last place team was eliminated, the remaining 2 teams would compete in Sumo. The sumo ring was oversized for the cars and was sectioned off so that various sections contained hazards. Water, sand, barbed wire, tire spikes and other devices were included to make the possibility of breakdown more likely. As with sumo wrestling, the first team to push the opponent out of the ring wins. Victory was also declared in the event of a vehicle surrendering or being rendered incapacitated.
