= Carpool (web series) =

British web series

- Genre: Talk show
- Created by: Robert Llewellyn
- Presented by: Robert Llewellyn
- Original language: English
- No. of episodes: 106

Production
- Running time: 10–30 minutes

Original release
- Network: www.llewtube.com iTunes; YouTube
- Release: 9 January 2009 – 9 July 2014

Related
- Carpool

Carpool is a web series presented by English actor and comedian Robert Llewellyn. In each episode he interviews a guest while giving them a lift in an eco-friendly car (normally a Toyota Prius hybrid electric vehicle). The guests are often well-known British television personalities such as Jonathan Ross or Ade Edmondson. However, Llewellyn also interviews less-well-known figures as long as he feels that they will prove to be an interesting subject. The guests also included Llewellyn's fellow Red Dwarf actors, Danny John Jules, Craig Charles, Chris Barrie and Hattie Hayridge (as well as Tony Hawks, Arthur Smith and Ruby Wax who all appeared in cameo roles in Red Dwarf, while Ed Bye, the show's producer/director, was the first person interviewed for the series). Llewellyn has also reunited with his Scrapheap Challenge co-hosts, Cathy Rogers and Lisa Rogers for interviews.

The show was filmed using small cameras mounted within the car. Llewellyn drives his guest to a destination of their choosing as they talk informally about a variety of subjects. As Llewellyn is driving for the majority of the time, it can be difficult to deal with technical problems especially interference from mobile phones. Occasionally, as in the Lisa Rogers episode, outside events such as being stopped by police interrupt the discussions.

The TV show, based on the web format, has been developed by RDF. Funded and sponsored by Toyota, Carpool was first broadcast on Dave on 4 November 2010. Carpool has been shortlisted for best content partnership in Broadcast Awards.

== Episodes ==
| Episode | Release date | Guest | Running time |
|---|---|---|---|
| 1 | 9 January 2009 | Ed Bye | 17:24 |
| 2 | 30 January 2009 | Jonathan Ross (in a Tesla) | 12:34 |
| 3 | 6 February 2009 | Danny John-Jules | 12:01 |
| 4 | 14 February 2009 | Arthur Smith | 14:03 |
| 5 | 20 February 2009 | Charlotte Reather | 12:40 |
| 6 | 28 February 2009 | Nigel Planer | 13:07 |
| 7 | 6 March 2009 | Ruby Wax | 20:05 |
| 8 | 13 March 2009 | Stephen Garrett (TV production company Kudos) | 13:06 |
| 9 | 19 March 2009 | Jo Brand | 18:07 |
| 10 | 27 March 2009 | David Baddiel | 17:47 |
| 11 | 3 April 2009 | Craig Charles | 19:45 |
| 12 | 10 April 2009 | Chris Barrie | 21:43 |
| 13 | 12 April 2009 | Maria McErlane | 13:45 |
| 14 | 17 April 2009 | Dom Joly | 18:04 |
| 15 | 24 April 2009 | David Mitchell | 21:17 |
| 16 | 1 May 2009 | Lisa Rogers | 22:45 |
| 17 | 8 May 2009 | Channelflipboys | 20:59 |
| 18 | 15 May 2009 | Charlotte McDonnell (formerly Charlie McDonnell) | 17:54 |
| 19 | 23 May 2009 | Stephen Fry | 31:57 |
| 20 | 29 May 2009 | Tony Hawks | 21:47 |
| 21 | 5 June 2009 | Jemima Kiss (journalist from The Guardian) | 20:46 |
| 22 | 12 June 2009 | Paul Lavelle (deep sea diver, Polar explorer) | 19:52 |
| 23 | 19 June 2009 | Dave Gorman | 22:24 |
| 24 | 23 June 2009 | Glastonbury Special | 19:19 |
| 25 | 26 June 2009 | Cathy Rogers | 17:34 |
| 26 | 3 July 2009 | Jason Calacanis | 18:51 |
| 27 | 10 July 2009 | Oliver James | 29:38 |
| 28 | 17 July 2009 | Diarmuid O'Connell (Tesla) | 24:02 |
| 29 | 24 July 2009 | Brian Cox | 30:32 |
| 30 | 31 July 2009 | Doug Coleman (Toyota USA) | 17:52 |
| 31 | 7 August 2009 | Sharon Corr | 28:59 |
| 32 | 14 August 2009 | John Kingston (Honda UK) | 29:00 |
| 33 | 21 August 2009 | David Frank (RDF Media) | 25:11 |
| 34 | 28 August 2009 | Richard Noble | 26:56 |
| 35 | 2518865 4 September 2009 | Leo Laporte | 27:36 |
| 36 | 11 September 2009 | Chelsea Sexton (Who Killed the Electric Car?) | 24:35 |
| 37 | 18 September 2009 | Rich Tuckwell (topgayer car review website) | 25:31 |
| 38 | 25 September 2009 | Alice Roberts | 30:42 |
| 39 | 2 October 2009 | Dale Vince (Ecotricity founder) | 28:04 |
| 40 | 5 October 2009 | Mitsubishi i MiEV Review (with Catherine Perrin of Mitsubishi) | 09:22 |
| 41 | 9 October 2009 | Paul Jackson | 27:55 |
| 42 | 16 October 2009 | Paul Fishkin (music producer) | 27:10 |
| 43 | 23 October 2009 | Adrian Edmondson | 25:56 |
| 44 | 30 October 2009 | Martha Lane Fox | 27:47 |
| 45 | 6 November 2009 | Duncan Jones | 27:09 |
| 46 | 13 November 2009 | Dick Strawbridge | 28:53 |
| 47 | 20 November 2009 | Liz Jackson | 26:50 |
| 48 | 27 November 2009 | Paul Scott (Plug In America) | 23:40 |
| 49 | 4 December 2009 | Graham Linehan | 26:59 |
| 50 | 11 December 2009 | Baroness Greenfield | 29:58 |
| 51 | 18 December 2009 | Richard Herring (Christmas special) | 27:58 |
| 52 | 8 January 2010 | Patrick Stewart | 33:07 |
| 53 | 15 January 2010 | Ben Goldacre | 29:28 |
| 54 | 22 January 2010 | Wilfred Emmanuel-Jones | 28:58 |
| 55 | 29 January 2010 | Rebecca Watson (Skepchick) | 28:01 |
| 56 | 5 February 2010 | Graham Fellows | 31:02 |
| 57 | 12 February 2010 | Rob Grant | 28:26 |
| 58 | 19 February 2010 | Chris Goodall | 25:06 |
| 59 | 26 February 2010 | Rich Fulcher | 25:40 |
| 60 | 5 March 2010 | Hattie Hayridge | 26:03 |
| 61 | 12 March 2010 | Jon Ronson | 29:52 |
| 62 | 19 March 2010 | John Lloyd | 29:36 |
| 63 | 26 March 2010 | Neil Mullarkey | 29:35 |
| 64 | 2 April 2010 | Yasmin Alibhai-Brown, Part 1 | 29:45 |
| 65 | 4 April 2010 | Yasmin Alibhai-Brown, Part 2 | 16:10 |
| 66 | 9 April 2010 | Quentin Willson | 25:57 |
| 67 | 16 April 2010 | Paul Daniels | 28:00 |
| 68 | 23 April 2010 | Mitch Benn | 21:10 |
| 69 | 30 April 2010 | Claudio von Planta | 29:24 |
| 70 | 7 May 2010 | Phill Jupitus | 31:56 |
| 71 | 14 May 2010 | Emma Kennedy | 28:56 |
| 72 | 21 May 2010 | Hans Teeuwen | 27:56 |
| 73 | 28 May 2010 | Adam Henson ('TractorPool' Special) | 28:27 |
| 74 | 25 June 2010 | Paul Drayson | 28:38 |
| 75 | 7 January 2011 | Ross Noble (Extended Dave Version) | 27:31 |
| 76 | 14 January 2011 | Stephen K. Amos (Extended Dave Version) | 19:39 |
| 77 | 21 January 2011 | Jason Manford (Extended Dave Version) | 25:36 |
| 78 | 28 January 2011 | Rufus Hound (Extended Dave Version) | 23:40 |
| 79 | 4 February 2011 | Chris Addison (Extended Dave Version) | 21:42 |
| 80 | 11 February 2011 | Arthur Smith (Extended Dave Version) | 28:18 |
| 81 | 17 February 2011 | Rob Brydon (Extended Dave Version) | 25:07 |
| 82 | 25 February 2011 | Aleks Krotoski | 28:04 |
| 83 | 1 March 2011 | Tim Minchin (Extended Dave Version) | 23:17 |
| 84 | 11 March 2011 | Kevin McCloud | 22:55 |
| 85 | 17 March 2011 | Craig Charles (Extended Dave Version) | 19:20 |
| 86 | 24 March 2011 | Andy Ihnatko | 21:57 |
| 87 | 31 March 2011 | Jeremy Hardy (Extended Dave Version) | 20:30 |
| 88 | 8 April 2011 | Relly Annett-Baker (Twitrelief Special) | 22:10 |
| 89 | 14 April 2011 | Tim Vine (Extended Dave Version) | 18:19 |
| 90 | 22 April 2011 | Shappi Khorsandi | 24:22 |
| 91 | 29 April 2011 | Phill Jupitus (Extended Dave Version) | 22:52 |
| 92 | 5 May 2011 | Bob Burnquist | 23:56 |
| 93 | 12 May 2011 | Doon Mackichan (Extended Dave Version) | 19:39 |
| 94 | 20 May 2011 | Dr Sue Black | 19:16 |
| 95 | 27 May 2011 | Paul Daniels (Extended Dave Version) | 23:50 |
| 96 | 2 June 2011 | Viv Albertine | 20:49 |
| 97 | 10 June 2011 | Jim Jefferies (Extended Dave Version) | 17:40 |
| 98 | 17 June 2011 | David Baddiel (Extended Dave Version) | 24:50 |
| 99 | 24 June 2011 | Anna Arrowsmith | 25:48 |
| 100 | 30 June 2011 | Jason Byrne (Extended Dave Version) | 21:43 |
| 101 | 7 July 2011 | Jo Brand (Extended Dave Version) | 18:08 |
| 102 | 15 July 2011 | Jamie Bestwick (BMX World Champion) | 19:30 |
| 103 | 22 July 2011 | Toby Williams (Comedian also known as Dr George Ryegold) (Extended Dave Version) | 19:02 |
| 104 | 29 July 2011 | Richard Herring (Extended Dave Version) | 19:39 |
| 105 | 20 November 2011 | Cory Doctorow | 26:50 |
| 106 | 9 July 2014 | Mark Thomas | 28:22 |
| 107 | 29 July 2016 | Richard Bruce (Fully Charged/Carpool Crossover) | 23:03 |

== Dave series guests ==
| Episode | Guests | Original Air Date |
|---|---|---|
| 1 | Rufus Hound and Jason Manford | 4 November 2010 |
| 2 | Arthur Smith and Chris Addison | 11 November 2010 |
| 3 | Rob Brydon and Jeremy Hardy | 18 November 2010 |
| 4 | Ross Noble and Stephen K Amos | 25 November 2010 |
| 5 | Craig Charles and Paul Daniels | 2 December 2010 |
| 6 | Jo Brand and Jason Byrne | 5 January 2011 |
| 7 | David Baddiel and Tim Minchin | 12 January 2011 |
| 8 | Phill Jupitus and Toby Williams | 19 January 2011 |
| 9 | Tim Vine and Doon Mackichan | 26 January 2011 |
| 10 | Jim Jefferies and Richard Herring | 2 February 2011 |

== Technical failures ==
Some shows were filmed, but due to technical failures, the episodes were never released. This is a list of them, along with the technical errors that occurred.

- Helen Lederer – Out of focus picture and inaudible sound.
- John Hegley – A "total sound fail".
- Nick Carpenter – Camera batteries were flat. (Filmed on the Silverstone GP Track)
- Cathy Rogers – Microphone failed halfway through, the first half was shown in her other episode

== Commissioning ==
At London Film and Comic Con in July 2009, Danny John-Jules mentioned that RDF Productions (the production company behind Scrapheap Challenge) had commissioned Carpool for broadcast and that Llewellyn is re-shooting a number of episodes in high-definition video for broadcast.

On 30 June 2010, it was announced that new shows will appear on the UKTV channel, Dave, as well as still appearing online after broadcast and that the format of the show will remain unchanged.

== See also ==
- Comedians in Cars Getting Coffee
- Peter Kay's Car Share
- Carpool Karaoke
