= Carpool (TV series) =

British television series

- Genre: Chat show
- Created by: Robert Llewellyn
- Directed by: Dom Bowles
- Presented by: Robert Llewellyn
- Composer: Nick Croft
- Country of origin: United Kingdom
- Original language: English
- No. of series: 1
- No. of episodes: 10

Production
- Executive producers: Robert Llewellyn; Cathy Rogers
- Producer: Tom Reynolds
- Editors: Phillip Marriott; Jamie Morton
- Running time: 24 mins approx
- Production companies: RDF Media; Toyota Prius

Original release
- Network: Dave
- Release: 4 November 2010 – 2 February 2011

Related
- Carpool

Carpool is a British television spin-off of the web series of the same name. It is presented by English actor and comedian Robert Llewellyn. In each episode he interviews a guest while giving them a ride in his Toyota Prius. The guests are mainly comedians/comedic actors that are well known in the UK. However, Llewellyn has also interviewed musical comedian Tim Minchin and magician Paul Daniels.

The show is filmed using high-definition cameras mounted within and outside the car. Llewellyn drives his guest to a destination of their choosing as they talk informally about various subjects. As Llewellyn is driving for the majority of the time it can be difficult to deal with technical problems, especially interference from mobile phones.

The show, based on the web format, is developed by RDF Contact, and fully funded by Toyota, who also sponsor the show. Carpool was first broadcast on Dave on 4 November 2010. Carpool has been shortlisted for best content partnership in Broadcast Awards. In an August, 2011 update of the web series, Llewellyn announced that the show would stay as a web-exclusive and that no more made-for-television episodes would be made.

== Episodes ==
Episode	Guests	Original Air Date	Total Viewing Figures (Inc. +1)
1	Rufus Hound and Jason Manford	4 November 2010	Less than 275,000
2	Arthur Smith and Chris Addison	11 November 2010	Less than 302,000
3	Rob Brydon and Jeremy Hardy	18 November 2010	Less than 295,000
4	Ross Noble and Stephen K Amos	25 November 2010	Less than 311,000
5	Craig Charles and Paul Daniels	2 December 2010	Less than 321,000
6	Jo Brand and Jason Byrne	5 January 2011	Less than 292,000
7	David Baddiel and Tim Minchin	12 January 2011	Less than 249,000
8	Phill Jupitus and Toby Williams	19 January 2011	Less than 259,000
9	Tim Vine and Doon Mackichan	26 January 2011	Less than 291,000
10	Jim Jefferies and Richard Herring	2 February 2011	TBC

== Commissioning ==
News of the TV version of Carpool first came at London Film and Comic Con in July 2009. Danny John-Jules, Llewellyn's Red Dwarf co-star, mentioned that RDF Contact (who produced Llewellyn's Scrapheap Challenge) had been commissioned by UKTV to produce Carpool for broadcast and that Llewellyn was shooting a number of episodes in high-definition.

On 30 June 2010 it was announced that the new shows would appear on the UKTV channel, Dave, as well as extended versions of the broadcast episodes appearing online on Llewellyn's YouTube page and on iTunes after broadcast, and that the format of the show will remain unchanged.

It is usually broadcast as an Easter Egg, hidden at the end of the last broadcast of the evening on Dave (at around 0240 hrs) and not mentioned in TV listings.
