= Million Seller =

Studio album by the Pooh Sticks
- Released: 1993
- Genre: Alternative rock, pop
- Label: Zoo/BMG
- Producer: Steve Gregory

The Pooh Sticks chronology
The Great White Wonder (1991)	Million Seller (1993)	Optimistic Fool (1995)

Million Seller is an album by the Welsh band the Pooh Sticks, released in 1993. The album was a commercial disappointment, and the band was dropped by Zoo Entertainment after its release.

The album's first single was "The World Is Turning On".

== Production ==
Million Seller was produced by Steve Gregory, with some assistance from Jim Rondinelli. The album cover depicts frontman Hue Williams floating on a 45 of Elvis Costello's "Accidents Will Happen". As on previous albums, the Pooh Sticks incorporated titles, lyrics, and melodies to popular songs in to Million Seller's 13 tracks.

== Critical reception ==
Professional ratings
Review scores
Source	Rating
AllMusic	4.5/5 stars
Chicago Tribune	3.5/4 stars
Robert Christgau	(1-star Honorable Mention)
The Encyclopedia of Popular Music	4/5 stars
The Indianapolis Star	3/4 stars
Spin Alternative Record Guide	9/10

The Washington Post deemed the album "hopelessly arch, impossibly infectious pop-punk." Trouser Press wrote that, "with [Amelia] Fletcher’s voice sweetly balancing Hue’s, 'Let the Good Times Roll' and 'The World Is Turning On' are fabulous confections, candy-pop mountains of ABBA-rock production and witty/silly lyrics." Robert Christgau considered the album to be "irony-pop gone hermeneutic—with nothing to say." The State likened it to "a '90s version of Sgt. Pepper or Atom Heart Mother."

Spin called the album "a desperately hummable, anxiously erotic masterpiece from a band with enough heart to make your head spin." Stereo Review noted that "these Brit youngsters—rigorous pop formalists with a cutesy streak more than a mile wide—apparently see themselves as the missing link between Neil Young and Edison Lighthouse... Few less auspicious concepts have ever been digitally preserved." The Village Voice labeled Million Seller "Carole King's Tapestry done by self-conscious sugarpop punks trying to rock and roll their way out of self-consciousness."

AllMusic called it "truly a classic pop record," writing: "Too polished and produced to garner alternative credibility, yet not the kind of record destined to get any mainstream exposure, Million Seller slipped between the cracks."

== Track listing ==
No.	Title	Length
1.	"Million Seller"
2.	"Let the Good Times Roll"
3.	"The World Is Turning On"
4.	"Sugar Baby"
5.	"I Saw the Light"
6.	"Susan Sleepwalking"
7.	"When the Girl Wants to Be Free"
8.	"Baby Wanna Go Round with Me"
9.	"Sugar Mello"
10.	"Rainbow Rider"
11.	"Goodbye Don't Mean I'm Gone"
12.	"Jelly on a Plate"
13.	"That Was the Greatest Song"
