= Kevin Pearce (writer) =

British music journalist and author

Kevin Pearce (born Dartford, Kent, 4 March 1964) is a music journalist and author. He is best known for the cult music book, Something Beginning With O, published by Heavenly Records in May 1993.

== Early work ==
After growing up in London during the punk rock era and being inspired by the DIY ethos Pearce became involved with fanzines. His first solo productions would be the Hungry Beat series, which became highly regarded during its existence from 1984 to 1987. Bob Stanley writing in The Times has said Hungry Beat "was droll, intelligent and fiercely passionate about pop. The three Hungry Beats deserve to be reprinted as Penguin Modern Classics."

Hungry Beat and its successor The Same Sky predominantly featured underground pop acts of the time, many of whom were associated with Creation Records or the indie pop scene such as Primal Scream, The Jasmine Minks, and The June Brides.

== Esurient Communications ==
Leaving fanzines behind Pearce became more involved with the business side of music, starting Esurient Communications, an independent record label based in London from 1988 to 1991. The label issued records by Hurrah!, The Jasmine Minks, The Claim, Hellfire Sermons and Emily. The shows Pearce promoted in London's West End became legendary for featuring the first London performance by the Manic Street Preachers in September 1989. The group's James Dean Bradfield recalled the occasion in an interview with The Quietus magazine: "My memory may not be absolutely accurate these days, but I do remember Richey having correspondence with Kevin Pearce. He was kind of a mod English eccentric, and there was a kind of 'fanzine mafia' with Kevin Pearce and Sarah Records and Heavenly. For me, it was all very very English. Richey had been sending things off to Sarah Records, and he sent things to Kevin Pearce and that’s how we got our first London gig, at the Horse And Groom at Great Portland St".

== Something Beginning With O ==
In May 1993 Heavenly Records published Pearce's book, Something Beginning With O. It was a deliberately short work that examined pop mythography. The book, an "intensely subjective description of obsessives, outsiders, risk takers, explorers" linked the 1960s mod movement with the 1970s punk rock explosion, and focused on three significant figures. These three figures were Paul Weller, Kevin Rowland, and Vic Godard. The book was enthusiastically reviewed, and quickly sold out of its first print run. It is now a much sought-after item, and continues to be referred to in other music related books, including Rip It Up And Start Again by Simon Reynolds.

== Sleevenotes and scripts ==
Resisting the urge to become a full-time music journalist, Pearce has nevertheless published work consistently. He has written sleevenotes for a number of high-profile artists, including Saint Etienne and The Wild Swans. He was also asked to write new notes for a reissue of the Mutant Disco compilation on ZE Records.

The liaison with Saint Etienne evolved into a partnership on their film, Finisterre - A Film About London, in 2003. The film, which was directed by Paul Kelly, featured a script written largely by Pearce with music from the group's album of the same name. Pearce worked with Paul Kelly and Saint Etienne on another short film in 2006. What Have You Done Today, Mervyn Day? looked at life in East London and how it would be changed by the 2012 Summer Olympics. Saint Etienne again supplied the soundtrack, and the script by Pearce was narrated by David Essex and Linda Robson
