= Rock Legends: Volume 69 =

- 53rd & 3rd (UK) release cover

Compilation album by Talulah Gosh
- Released: October 1987
- Genre: Indie pop, twee pop
- Length: 32:00
- Label: Constrictor
- Producer: Martin Hayward, Talulah Gosh, John A. Rivers

Talulah Gosh chronology
Rock Legends: Volume 69 (1987)	They've Scoffed the Lot (1991)

Professional ratings
Review scores
Source	Rating
Allmusic	4/5 stars
Underground	1/3 stars

Rock Legends: Volume 69 is a compilation of single tracks by the twee pop band Talulah Gosh.

== Releases ==
It was first issued in October 1987 by Constrictor Records in Germany, then in mid-1988 by 53rd & 3rd in Britain. The title is a parody of various artists compilations.

Legends collected the five singles the band released between December 1986 and May 1988 and "My Boy Says" which first appeared on a Shelter charity LP; apart from a flexi-disc track called "I Told You So", every studio recording by the band was included. It was later complemented by They've Scoffed the Lot in 1991, which compiled the two BBC Radio 1 sessions the band recorded, for John Peel and Janice Long.

Both records and "I Told You So" were eventually brought together in 1996 for the anthology Backwash, which also included two previously unreleased live tracks. The only aspect omitted on Backwash is a spoken count-in to "Strawberry Girl".

The German and British versions of Rock Legends featured different artwork; the UK edition (designed by drummer Mathew Fletcher) is shown here. A 1991 compilation called Talulah Mania (and subtitled Rock Legends : Volume 69) has an identical track listing.

== Track listing ==
=== Side one ===
1. "Beatnik Boy" Price
2. "My Best Friend" Fletcher
3. "Steaming Train" Fletcher
4. "Just a Dream" Price
5. "Talulah Gosh" Fletcher
6. "Don't Go Away" Fletcher
7. "Escalator Over the Hill" Momtchiloff

=== Side two ===
1. "My Boy Says" Price
2. "The Way of the World" Momtchiloff
3. "Testcard Girl" Scott
4. "Bringing Up Baby" Fletcher/Sairey
5. "I Can't Get No Satisfaction, Thank God" Momtchiloff
6. "Strawberry Girl" Fletcher/Farry
