= Backwash (album) =

Compilation album by Talulah Gosh
- Released: 21 May 1996
- Recorded: 1986–1988
- Genres: Indie pop, twee pop
- Labels: K Records, Damaged Goods

Talulah Gosh chronology
They've Scoffed the Lot (1991)	Backwash (1996)

Professional ratings
Review scores
Source	Rating
Allmusic	link

Backwash is a retrospective compilation of music by the group Talulah Gosh.

== The album ==
Released on LP and CD by K Records in 1996 (see 1996 in music), it contains all of their single and radio session tracks, plus live versions of two songs of which no studio recordings exist ("Pastels Badge" and "Rubber Ball") and a flexi-disc track ("I Told You So"). The compilation falls in the field of twee pop.

With their earlier collections Rock Legends: Volume 69 and They've Scoffed the Lot now out of print, Backwash remains the only commercially available record by the band. As well as the three exclusive songs, both of these previous compilations are included here, save for a short count-in (by either Eithne Farry or Amelia Fletcher) on "The Girl with the Strawberry Hair", which is omitted.

The artwork resembles the cover of They've Scoffed the Lot: as well as the pattern design, two members are shown on the front with three on the back. On Scoffed the lineup with Elizabeth Price was represented, while on Backwash her successor Eithne Farry is shown.

Backwash was given the rare 10/10 rating by NME.

=== Was It Just A Dream? ===
With the physical formats of Backwash out of print, a new compilation titled Was It Just A Dream? was released on Damaged Goods - Damgood364lp/cd in 2013. This contained Backwash in full, with the addition of four demo tracks recorded in 1986 and previously issued as a limited edition EP for Record Store Day in 2011.

== Track listing ==
=== Side one ===
1. "Beatnik Boy"
2. "My Best Friend"
3. "Steaming Train"
4. "Just a Dream"
5. "Talulah Gosh"
6. "Don't Go Away"
7. "Escalator Over the Hill"

=== Side two ===
1. "My Boy Says"
2. "Way of the World"
3. "Testcard Girl"
4. "Bringing Up Baby"
5. "I Can't Get No Satisfaction (Thank God)"
6. "The Girl with the Strawberry Hair"

=== Side three ===
1. "Talulah Gosh (radio session version)"
2. "Do you Remember"
3. "Looking for a Rainbow"
4. "Sunny Inside"

=== Side four ===
1. "My World's Ending"
2. "Be Your Baby"
3. "Break Your Face"
4. "In Love for the Very First Time"
5. "Spearmint Head"
6. "I Told You So"
7. "Pastels Badge"
8. "Rubber Ball"

=== Was It Just A Dream? additional tracks ===
Was It Just A Dream has the Backwash tracks in the same order, but with the side breaks after "Talulah Gosh (session version)" and "Spearmint Head", and four extra tracks appended to side four:

1. "Steaming Train" (demo)
2. "I Told You So" (demo)
3. "Mmm Mmm He's So Dreamy" (demo)
4. "Sunny Inside" (demo)
