= Razorcuts =

British indie pop band

Razorcuts were an indie pop band formed in 1984 in London. The group centred on Gregory Webster and Tim Vass (who were previously in The Cinematics), with various musicians including Peter Momtchiloff of Heavenly and Talulah Gosh, Angus Stevenson (later of the Relationships), Struan Robertson and New Zealand drummer David Swift. Early releases on the Subway Organisation label, including the debut "Big Pink Cake", led to a deal with Creation Records, for whom they released two albums.

Razorcuts split up on 21 April 1990. Vass went on to form Red Chair Fadeaway, Dandelion Wine and, in 2022, silver biplanes. Webster formed The Carousel, Saturn V and then, in the late 1990s, Sportique. The duo reunited under the name Forever People in 1992 for a one-off single on Sarah Records.

== Discography ==
Chart placings are from the UK Indie Chart.

=== Albums ===
- Storyteller (1988, Creation, CRELP026)
- The World Keeps Turning (1989, Creation, CRELP045/CRECD045; CD includes Storyteller)

=== Compilations ===
- Patterns on the Water: A Retrospective (1991, Creation, CRECD119)
- R Is for Razorcuts (2002, Matinée Recordings, MATCD12)

=== Singles and EPs ===
- "Sad Kaleidoscope" (7" flexi, 1986, The Legend!, LEG 100) (split flexi with The Wolfhounds)
- "Big Pink Cake" (7", 1986, Subway Organisation, SUBWAY 5) No. 44
- "Sorry to Embarrass You" (7"/12", 1986, Subway Organisation, Subway 8(T)) No. 10
- "Sad Kaleidoscope" (7" flexi, 1987, Sha-la-la, BA 002) (split flexi with Talulah Gosh given away with fanzines Are You Scared to Get Happy? No. 3 and Trout Fishing In Leytonstone No. 3)
- "I Heard You the First Time" (7"/12", 1987, Flying Nun UK, FNUK9(T)) No. 15
- "Sometimes I Worry About You" (7", 1990, Caff Corporation, CAFF10)
- "A Is for Alphabet EP" (CD EP, 2003, Matinée Recordings, MATCD47)
