= 2012 Turner Prize =

British prize for contemporary art

Tate Britain's 2012 Turner Prize was awarded to video artist Elizabeth Price for her 2012 twenty-minute video installation The Woolworths Choir of 1979. The other nominees were Spartacus Chetwynd, video artist Luke Fowler, and visual artist Paul Noble.

The £25,000 prize was presented by Jude Law 3 December 2012 in a ceremony at Tate Britain. Elizabeth Price was the first pure video artist to win since Steve McQueen in 1999.
