= The Great White Wonder =

1991 studio album by The Pooh Sticks

Studio album by The Pooh Sticks
- Released: June 1991
- Recorded: Hollywood First Audio, Los Angeles/Vuurland Studios, Utrecht
- Genre: Indie pop
- Length: 38:35
- Label: Cheree
- Producer: Steve Gregory

The Pooh Sticks chronology
| Formula One Generation (1990) | The Great White Wonder (1991) | Million Seller (1993) |

The Great White Wonder is the second full-length album by the Welsh band The Pooh Sticks. The album was released in June 1991 and is the band's final album release on an independent label before signing to RCA Records in 1992. The album features guest vocals from Amelia Fletcher.

== Overview ==
The Pooh Sticks released this album in 1991 after a 1990 tour of America, and the album reflected their "embrace of kitsch Americana". Like their previous work, The Great White Wonder takes bit of material (song titles, guitar riffs, melodies) of 1970s music icons and molds them into something of their own. This release features nods to Neil Young, Helen Reddy, Kim Fowley, Smokey Robinson, Ozark Mountain Daredevils, Peter Frampton, Jonathan Richman, Lou Reed, Sweet, Chic, James Taylor and Sham 69. Despite a poor response both at home and in America it was voted Spin's 'Number 1 Album of 1991 You Didn't Hear'.

== Reception ==
Professional ratings
Review scores
| Source | Rating |
|---|---|
| AllMusic | 4.5/5 stars |
| The Great Indie Discography | 7/10 |

"Tough and tight like early punk, hooky like sugar pop" is how Joe Levy of Spin has described The Great White Wonder. He also writes that their "obsession with recapturing innocent thrills...keeps them on the right side of parody". He closes by saying the album is "brilliant, clever, and sarcastic, but more importantly, incredible fun." Also from Spin, Regina Joseph in describing the influence of the 1970s on the album writes that the band "shamelessly wallow[s] in the goofiest dreck of that misbegotten era" and closes by writing that the album's "triumph lies in creating cool parody while keeping it as innocent as child's play." Jason Ankeny of AllMusic writes that the band "rape, plunder and pillage the history of pop music with manic glee" in reference to their use of old source material, and concludes that they are "in love with pop music" and the album is "their valentine to rock & roll." In his New York Times review of the album, Milo Miles calls the band "a potent, ingenious rock-and-roll band" and comments on the album's "bright vocal harmonies and guitar-pumped melodies of mid-60's pop".

== Track list ==
All songs written by Steve Gregory unless otherwise noted.

1. "Young People" (Andrew Griffiths/Hywel James) – 3:54
2. "The Rhythm of Love" (Bob Feldman/Jerry Goldstein/Richard Gottehrer) – 3:26
3. "Sweet Baby James" (Bob Gaudio) – 3:11
4. "Pandora's Box" – 2:56
5. "Desperado" – 4:45
6. "Goodtimes" – 2:01
7. "The Wild One, Forever" – 1:16
8. "I'm in You" – 14:38
9. "When Sunny Gets Blue" – 2:41

== Personnel ==
- Steve Gregory – producer, songwriter
- Hue Williams – vocals
- Alison – bass
- Stephanie – drums
- Trudi Tangerine – liner notes, Moog synthesizer, piano, synthesizer, tambourine
- Paul – guitar
- Amelia Fletcher – vocals
- Alan Forbes – art director
- Andrew Griffiths – composer
- Hywel James – composer
- Crazy Katie Lake – engineer
