= The Block (British TV series) =

British reality television series

- Genre: Reality
- Created by: David Barbour; Julian Cress
- Presented by: Lisa Rogers
- Starring: Matt Brown
- Judges: Nicholas Cowell
- Country of origin: United Kingdom
- Original language: English
- No. of series: 1
- No. of episodes: 8

Production
- Production locations: Brighton, East Sussex, England, UK
- Running time: 60 minutes (inc. adverts)
- Production company: RDF Television

Original release
- Network: ITV
- Release: 3 August – 21 September 2004

The Block is a British reality television show that aired on ITV from 3 August to 21 September 2004, based on the Australian series of the same name. The show was presented by Lisa Rogers with Nicholas Cowell judging the properties. The show also had a sister show on ITV2 hosted by Matt Brown.

The show was ITV's third series in 2004 with a property makeover reality TV theme, following Trouble in Paradise and Building the Dream.

== Format ==
The show followed 4 couples renovating four identical apartments in Brighton, with each couple given a budget of £25,000 to do so. They had to live in the apartments while continuing their daily lives.

Each week the couples are required to complete renovating a room in their apartment. At the end of each week's episode the room was judged by property expert Nicholas Cowell (brother of Simon Cowell) and the best couple won a prize (either furniture or building materials).

At the end of the series, the finished apartments were all put up for auction and the couple whose apartment was sold for the highest value won £50,000.

== Broadcast ==
The series originally aired on Tuesdays at 9pm, but later moved to an 11pm slot on the same night due to poor ratings.
