= Le Jardin de Heavenly =

Studio album by Heavenly
- Released: 1992
- Recorded: February 1992
- Genre: Indie pop, twee pop
- Label: Sarah Records (Sarah 610); K Records (KLP013)
- Producer: Richard Edwards

Heavenly chronology
Heavenly vs. Satan (1991)	Le Jardin de Heavenly (1992)	The Decline and Fall of Heavenly (1994)

Professional ratings
Review scores
Source	Rating
AllMusic	4.5/5 stars
Robert Christgau	(2-star Honorable Mention)
The Encyclopedia of Popular Music	3/5 stars
Entertainment Weekly	B+
NME	1/10
The New Rolling Stone Album Guide	3/5 stars

Le Jardin de Heavenly is the second studio album by British twee pop band Heavenly. The album was released on Sarah Records in the United Kingdom and K Records in the United States.

Beat Happening's Calvin Johnson sings on the track "C is the Heavenly Option".

== Critical reception ==
Entertainment Weekly wrote that "by keeping the sound sassy and the singing strong, Heavenly’s Le Jardin de Heavenly is adorable without being coy." Melody Maker wrote that the album "recreates only the most stylised cliches of childhood." Greil Marcus described the album as "Beatles echoes cut with a present-day cynicism so light it merely seems like doubt."

Pitchfork said, "Stacked vocal harmonies and sugary guitars mark Le Jardin de Heavenly as quintessentially '90s indie pop, but it's the band's lyrical benevolence that makes these songs so tasteful."

== Track listing ==
1. "Starshy"
2. "Tool"
3. "Orange Corduroy Dress"
4. "Different Day"
5. "C is the Heavenly Option"
6. "Smile"
7. "And the Birds Aren't Singing"
8. "Sort of Mine"

== K Records reissue ==
=== Track listing ===
1. "Starshy"
2. "Tool"
3. "Orange Corduroy Dress"
4. "Different Day"
5. "C is the Heavenly Option"
6. "Smile"
7. "And the Birds Aren't Singing"
8. "Sort of Mine"
9. "So Little Deserve"
10. "I'm Not Scared of You"
