= Operation Heavenly =

Studio album by Heavenly
- Released: October 1996
- Genre: Twee pop
- Length: 34:03
- Labels: Wiiija, K Records
- Producer: Ian Shaw

Heavenly chronology
The Decline and Fall of Heavenly (1994)	Operation Heavenly (1996)	Highway to Heavenly (2026)

Professional ratings
Review scores
Source	Rating
AllMusic	4/5 stars

Operation Heavenly is the fourth studio album by British twee pop band Heavenly. It was released by Wiiija in October 1996. In the United States it was issued by K Records, whose founder Calvin Johnson provided guest vocals on "Pet Monkey". The album contains ten original songs and a cover of Serge Gainsbourg's "Nous Ne Somme Pas Des Anges".

K released "Trophy Girlfriend" on a split 7-inch single with two songs by Bis. The single bore the overall title International Pop Underground Vol. 66.

"Space Manatee" was also released as a single, backed by two exclusive B-sides: covers of "You Tore Me Down" (originally by The Flamin' Groovies) and "Art School" (by The Jam). The two cover versions were included on a Japanese reissue of the album in 1998.

Music videos were made for both singles.

After Mathew Fletcher died by suicide in June 1996, the remaining members retired the name Heavenly. They later regrouped as Marine Research for one album in 1999. The band later returned under the name Heavenly in 2023 for a concert at Bush Hall before performing further concerts in several countries the next year, releasing a new single "Portland Town" the year after, and announcing a new record for 2026.

== Track listing ==
1. "Trophy Girlfriend"
2. "K-Klass Kisschase"
3. "Space Manatee"
4. "Ben Sherman"
5. "By the Way"
6. "Cut Off"
7. "Nous Ne Sommes Pas Des Anges"
8. "Mark Angel"
9. "Fat Lenny"
10. "Snail Trail"
11. "Pet Monkey"
