= Lisa Rogers =

Welsh television presenter

- Born: 7 September 1971 (age 54)
- Education: Monmouth School for Girls
- Occupation: Television presenter
- Years active: 1997–present
- Spouse: Aidan Mclaughlin (m. 2015)

Lisa Rogers (born 7 September 1971) is a Welsh television presenter. She has appeared in films, television programmes, theatre and radio.

== Early life ==
While at school, she took jobs in a chocolate factory, as a farrier, and, while studying drama at Loughborough University, she was a nanny and manager of Santa's grotto.

== Television ==
Rogers started her television career as a researcher on shows including Johnny Vaughan's The Fall Guy, The Girlie Show, Absolutely Animals and Light Lunch with fellow researcher Dermot O'Leary.

While Rogers was working as an assistant producer and not wishing to miss the World Cup, a friend suggested she audition for the football show Under the Moon on Channel 4. She first starred on Channel 4's The Big Breakfast in June 2000, when she hosted the "Find Me a Weather Presenter" segment. This resulted in an irregular role, which led to later co-presenting, before the show ended in March 2002. She was also the presenter of the reality television show The Block. She played the character Tanya in the 2000 TV mini series Lock, Stock..., a spin-off from the film Lock, Stock and Two Smoking Barrels.

From 2002 to 2008, Rogers co-presented the Channel 4 engineering game show Scrapheap Challenge alongside Robert Llewellyn. To date, Rogers is the show's second-longest standing presenter, after Llewellyn. The duo also presented the spin-off series The Scrappy Races from 2003 to 2005. In 2003, Rogers also presented the ITV documentary series Mistresses, and appeared as a regular panellist on Loose Women.

As of 2008, Rogers has most recently been seen as the presenter of Sunshine for Channel 4, which previewed the new Danny Boyle film of the same name, and as a regular presenter of Sky One's motoring programme Vroom Vroom.

In August 2008, Rogers presented a documentary that ended up becoming a polemic about genital plastic surgery, The Perfect Vagina. In 2009, she reunited with Llewellyn for an episode of his web-based interview series Carpool.

== Personal life ==
Rogers' family originates from Trellech near Monmouth.

In the summer of 2000, she started a relationship with actor Ralf Little. Starting in 2003, she was in a two-year relationship with former Stereophonics drummer Stuart Cable; Cable was married at the time. They were seeing each other at the time he was sacked from the group. She currently lives in Monmouthshire with her two daughters.

Rogers married in August 2015.

== Television appearances ==
Television
Year	Title	Role	Notes
2011	Scrum V	Co-Presenter	2011
2010	Welsh Rugby in the Noughties	Presenter	2010
2009	Sport Wales	Presenter	2009–
2008	The Perfect Vagina	Presenter	2008
2008	The Wright Stuff	Guest Panelist	2008 (1 episode)
2006	Vroom Vroom	Presenter	2006–2007 (2 episodes)
2006	Brainiac's Test Tube Baby	Guest	2006 (1 episode)
2006	Scrapheap Challenge: Scrappy Races Rally	Co-presenter	2006 (1 series)
2006	Showbiz Poker	Presenter	
2006	Holiday	Reporter	2006 (1 episode)
2004	The Block	Presenter	2004 (1 series)
2003	Loose Women	Panelist	2003 (6 episodes)
2003	Scrapheap Challenge: The Scrappy Races	Presenter	2003–2005 (series 1 and series 2)
2003	Mistresses	Presenter	(9 episodes)
2002	Scrapheap Challenge	Presenter	2002–2008 (series 5 to series 10)
2002	Sport Relief	Presenter	2002
2002	Shooting Stars	Guest Panelist	2002 (1 episode)
2002	Celebrity Addicts	Presenter	2002 (1 series)
2001	People Do the Craziest Things	Presenter	2001 (1 series)
2001	I Love 1980's	Guest	2001 (4 episodes)
2001	I Love 1990's	Guest	2001 (2 episodes)
2001	100 Greatest Kids' TV shows	Presenter	2001
2001	A Question of TV	Guest Panelist	2001 (1 episode)
2001	Liquid News	Guest	2001 (1 episode)
2001	Never Mind the Buzzcocks	Guest Panelist	2001 (1 episode)
2001	The Big Breakfast	Presenter	2001–2002
2000	It's Only TV...but I Like It	Guest	2000 (1 episode)
2000	Grudge Match	Presenter	2000 (1 series)
2000	Exclusive	Guest	2000 (1 episode)
2000	Top of the Pops Plus	Presenter	2000 (1 series)
2000	Lock, Stock...	Tanya	2000
1999	The Games Room	Presenter	1999
1999	Slave	Presenter	1999 (1 series)
1999	20th Century Stuff	Presenter	1999 (1 series)
1998	Under the Moon	Presenter	1998 (1 series)
1997	Light Lunch	Researcher	1997
