= Heavenly (British band) =

British twee pop band

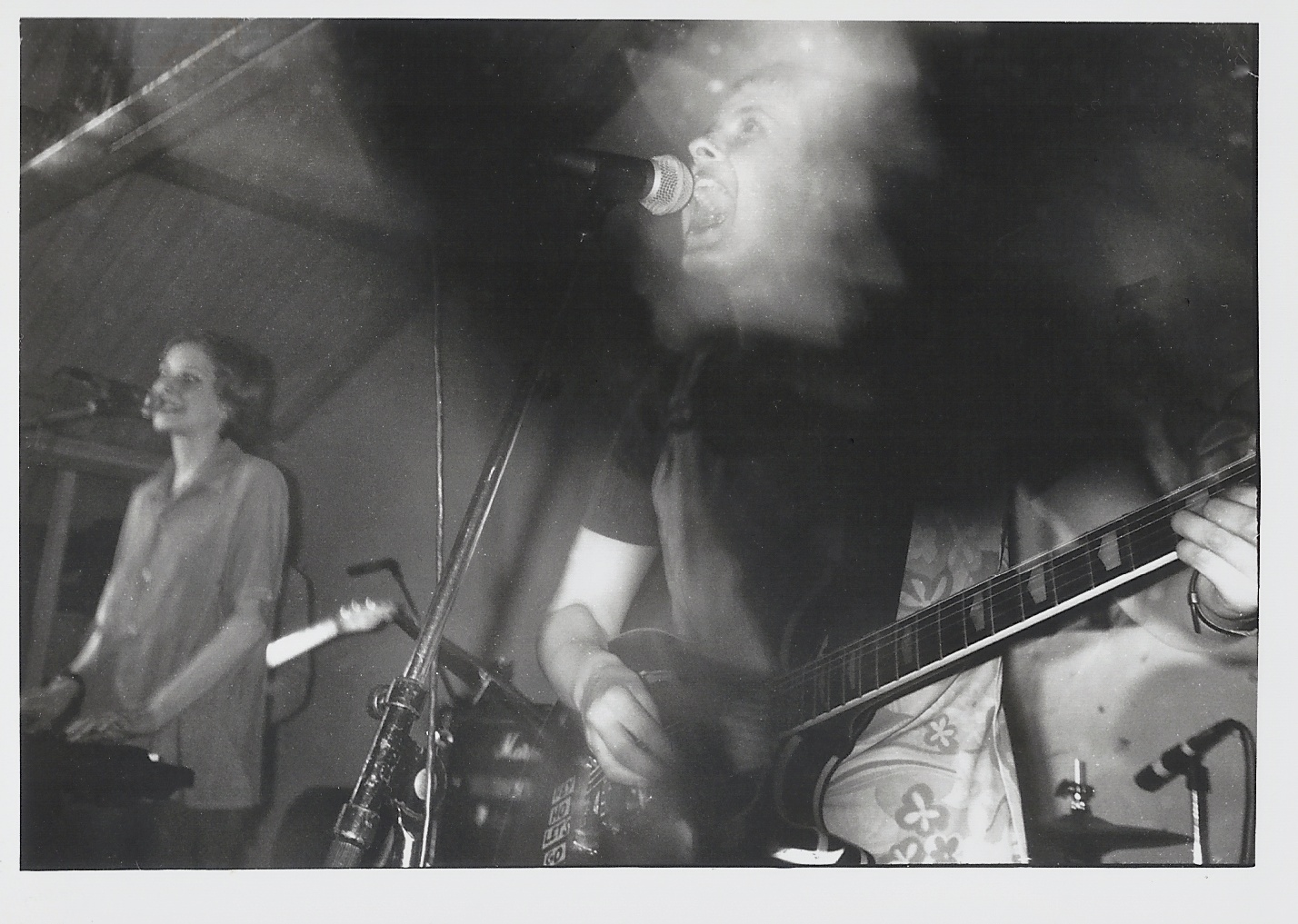
- Heavenly performing at the Emerald Centre in 1994

Background information
- Origin: Oxford, England
- Genres: Twee pop, indie pop, indie rock
- Years active: 1989–1996, 2023–present
- Labels: Sarah, K, Wiiija, Skep Wax
- Spinoffs: Marine Research; Tender Trap; The Catenary Wires; Swansea Sound
- Spinoff of: Talulah Gosh
- Members: Amelia Fletcher; Ian Button; Peter Momtchiloff; Robert Pursey; Cathy Rogers
- Past members: Mathew Fletcher

Heavenly are an English indie rock band, originally forming in Oxford, England in 1989. Amelia Fletcher (vocals/guitar), Mathew Fletcher (drums; Amelia's brother), Peter Momtchiloff (guitar) and Robert Pursey (bass) were all previously members of Talulah Gosh, a key member of the C86 scene.

The band's music employed twangy guitar tones, punk rock-influenced lyricism, and girl group-style vocal harmonies. They incorporated elements of riot grrrl music on later releases in their career. Publications such as AllMusic consider Heavenly's discography to be essential to indie rock history.

== History ==
=== Formation ===
After the dissolution of her previous band Talulah Gosh, singer and guitarist Amelia Fletcher recorded an electronic solo single, "Can You Keep A Secret?", released on Welsh record label Fierce in 1988. When this didn't make any impact, she gathered some of her former bandmates to start a new band, guitarist Peter Momtchiloff, bassist Rob Pursey, and her drummer brother Mathew Fletcher.

The band initially planned to start their own label and self-release their music. However, they joined the indie pop label Sarah Records when owners Matt Haynes and Clare Wadd offered to release the band's recordings after seeing their second concert, supporting The Television Personalities at The Camden Falcon.

=== First singles and Heavenly vs. Satan ===
Heavenly made their recorded debut with the 7" single "I Fell in Love Last Night", followed by another 7", "Our Love Is Heavenly", both released in 1990 on Sarah. Heavenly vs. Satan, the group's debut album, came out in 1991. At this stage in their career, the instrumentation remained very much the same jangly guitar style used by Talulah Gosh.

=== Le Jardin de Heavenly ===
Before releasing their critically acclaimed second album Le Jardin de Heavenly in early 1992, Cathy Rogers (keyboard, back-up vocals) joined the band. Her harmony vocals and keyboards became an integral part of the group's sound. The group's second album also features the track "C is the Heavenly Option," featuring the guest vocals of K Records founder Calvin Johnson, who released Heavenly's records in the US.

Shortly after the album's release they went over to the U.S.A. for some tour dates. During an extended stay in Olympia, Washington, the band experienced the early Riot grrrl scene there, finding kindred spirits in other feminist and anti-corporate musicians.

In late 1992, Amelia Fletcher appeared on Channel 4's The Word with Brighton band Huggy Bear for the performance of their song "Her Jazz".

=== Further singles and The Decline and Fall of Heavenly ===
Before their next long-player, Heavenly released two non-album 7" singles, "P.U.N.K. Girl" and "Atta Girl." These signalled a growing complexity in Fletcher's songwriting, particularly "Atta Girl," in which Fletcher and Rogers sung in rapid-fire trade-off vocals. A broadening (and darkening) of lyrical subject matter was shown in the B-side, "Hearts and Crosses," which told the story of a date rape, with an upbeat keyboard riff providing an ironic counterpoint.

The band's third LP was The Decline and Fall of Heavenly (1994). In 1995, the band contributed the song "Snail Trail" to the AIDS benefit album Red Hot + Bothered produced by the Red Hot Organization.

=== Operation Heavenly and dissolution ===
The group's last album before dissolution was Operation Heavenly (1996). Arriving in the middle of the Britpop boom, the album contained a cover of the Serge Gainsbourg-penned and France Gall-performed "Nous ne sommes pas des anges," sung entirely in French by Fletcher. Due to the closing of Sarah Records it was released on Wiiija. It included a second Calvin Johnson guest spot on the track "Pet Monkey."

However, shortly before the release of Operation Heavenly, Mathew Fletcher took his own life. The remaining members announced that the band name Heavenly was to be retired, but that they would continue, using the name Marine Research, a moniker under which they released a single album, 1999's Sounds from the Gulf Stream, on K Records (it was not released separately in Britain). Afterwards, Marine Research dissolved.

The band's core members reformed in 2002 as Tender Trap, releasing four albums before going on indefinite hiatus in 2014. As of 2024, Fletcher and Pursey are both in The Catenary Wires and Swansea Sound, while Momtchiloff plays in Would-Be-Goods and Tufthunter.

=== Reformation and Highway to Heavenly ===
Heavenly reunited for a concert at Bush Hall in London in May 2023, with Ian Button replacing Mathew Fletcher on drums. In 2024, the band played further dates in Spain, France and the US. The band premiered new songs while playing these reunion shows.

In 2025, Heavenly released a single "Portland Town" on Skep Wax Records, their first new release since 1996.

The band released Highway to Heavenly, their first album in 30 years, on 27th February of 2026.

== Discography ==
=== Studio albums ===
- Heavenly vs. Satan (Sarah 603, 1991)
- Le Jardin de Heavenly (Sarah 610, 1992)
- The Decline and Fall of Heavenly (Sarah 623, 1994)
- Operation Heavenly (WIJ 1053 / KLP 59, 1996)
- Highway to Heavenly (Skep Wax, 2026)

=== Compilation albums ===
- This Is Heavenly (ER 1010, 1995)
- A Bout De Heavenly: The Singles (Damgood 537, 2020)

=== EPs ===
- P.U.N.K. Girl (KLP 25, 1995)

=== Singles ===
- "I Fell in Love Last Night" b/w "Over and Over" (7", Sarah 30, 1990)
- "Our Love Is Heavenly" b/w "Wrap My Arms Around Him" (7", Sarah 41, 1990)
- "So Little Deserve" b/w "I'm Not Scared of You" (7", Sarah 51, 1991)
- "She Says" b/w "Escort Crash on Marston Street" (7", IPU 25, 1991)
- "P.U.N.K. Girl" b/w "Hearts and Crosses" (7", Sarah 81, 1993)
- "Atta Girl" b/w "Dig Your Own Grave", "So?" (7", Sarah 82, 1993)
- "Keroleen / Trophy Girlfriend" (split with Bis) (7", IPU 66, 1996)
- "Space Manatee" b/w "You Tore Me Down", "Art School" (7", IPU 73 / WIJ 58, 1996)
- "Portland Town" b/w "Someone Who Cares" (7", SkepWax 31, 2025)

== See also ==
- Talulah Gosh
- The Pooh Sticks
- Marine Research
- Tender Trap
