= Eithne Farry =

Eithne Farry is the former literary editor of ELLE. She is the author of "Yeah, I Made it Myself". She was a backing singer with Talulah Gosh and has reviewed a book for Marie Claire.

== Works ==
- Yeah, I Made it Myself: DIY Fashion for the Not Very Domestic Goddess. (2006), W&N. ISBN 0-297-85117-9.
- Lovely Things to Make for Girls of Slender Means. (2010), W&N. ISBN 0-297-85954-4.
- Co-author of the Encyclopedia of Singles with Philip Dodd, Michael Heatley and Martin Noble; Paul Du Noyer as the General Editor.
