= Marine Research =

British band (1997–1999)

- Origin: United Kingdom
- Genres: Indie rock, twee pop, punk rock
- Labels: K Records, Elefant Records
- Spinoff of: Heavenly

Marine Research were an indie pop group, based in Oxford/London (UK), formed in 1997 by four of the five members of Heavenly (Amelia Fletcher, Peter Momtchiloff, Cathy Rogers and Rob Pursey), following the death of Heavenly drummer Mathew Fletcher. The band were joined on drums by DJ Downfall (John Stanley), who is also a solo recording artist.

After the band disbanded in 1999, vocalist and keyboardist Cathy Rogers moved to the United States of America, and became well known for producing and starring in the television show Junkyard Wars. Lead singer and songwriter Amelia Fletcher was also in the group Talulah Gosh and later recorded with Tender Trap, alongside bassist Rob Pursey and drummer John Stanley. Guitarist Peter Momtchiloff now plays in Would-Be-Goods, Speed of Sound and Scarlet's Well.

== Musical style and influences ==
AllMusic described the band's sound as a fusion of "uppity twee-pop and punk rock undertones". The site stated that lingering influence from the members' previous project Talulah Gosh is apparent in the band's music. The site also said that the band employs much of the same "gentle, bouncy, pop hookiness" that Heavenly was known for.

== Sounds from the Gulf Stream ==
Sounds from the Gulf Stream

Studio album by Marine Research
- Released: 23 August 1999
- Genre: indie pop
- Label: K

Sounds from the Gulf Stream
Review scores
Source	Rating
Allmusic	link

The band recorded just one album. Sounds from the Gulf Stream, released on K Records (USA) and Elefant Records (Spain). Nods to Heavenly are present, especially in terms of the twangy guitar and multi-layered vocals.

=== Track listing ===
1. "Parallel Horizontal" (3:21)
2. "You and a Girl" (4:42)
3. "Hopefulness to Hopelessness" (4:02)
4. "Queen B" (3:54)
5. "Chucking Out Time" (3:00)
6. "Glamour Gap" (3:47)
7. "At the Lost and Found" (2:37)
8. "Venn Diagram" (2:57)
9. "End of the Affair" (3:24)
10. "Y.Y.U.B." (4:19)

== Discography ==
- "Queen B" (7-inch single; 1998)
- "Sick and Wrong"/"By the Way" (split 7-inch with Built to Spill; 1999)
- "Parallel Horizontal" (EP; 1999)
- "Sounds from the Gulf Stream" (LP; 1999)
- "In The Bleak Midwinter" (John Peel session exclusive; 1999)
