= The Decline and Fall of Heavenly =

Studio album by Heavenly
- Released: 28 September 1994
- Recorded: April – June 1994
- Studio: Shaw Sound, Fulham
- Genre: Twee, indie pop
- Label: Sarah; SARAH 623
- Producer: Ian Shaw

Heavenly chronology
Le Jardin de Heavenly (1992)	The Decline and Fall of Heavenly (1994)	Operation Heavenly (1996)

The Decline and Fall of Heavenly is the third studio album by British indie pop band Heavenly. It was released in September 1994 by Sarah Records in the UK and K Records in the United States.

== Background ==
=== Recording ===
Four songs were re-recorded for a John Peel radio session in June 1994: the instrumental "Sacramento", "Itchy Chin", "Doomster (Three Star Compartment)", and "Sperm Meets Egg, So What?".

=== Release history ===
A Japanese reissue on Quattro added five tracks from two British EPs (also released on one CD by both Sarah and K): "Atta Girl", "Dig Your Own Grave", "P.U.N.K. Girl", "Hearts and Crosses", and "So?".

== Reception ==
Professional ratings
Review scores
Source	Rating
AllMusic	4/5 stars
Entertainment Weekly	B
The Rolling Stone Album Guide	3/5 stars

Entertainment Weekly states that the music "adds spice with two harmonizing female vocalists sweetly delivering dry, sarcastic lyrics about things like trying to get a lover to leave so you can wake up alone." From AllMusic: "... a cleanly produced sequence of bouncy, guitar-based pop songs—and fans of the band know just how good they are at writing bouncy pop songs. The only problem with The Decline and Fall is that it's so painfully short."

== Track listing ==
1. "Me and My Madness"
2. "Modestic"
3. "Skipjack"
4. "Itchy Chin"
5. "Sacramento"
6. "Three Star Compartment"
7. "Sperm Meets Egg, So What?"
8. "She and Me"
