= Tender Trap =

English indiepop/twee pop band

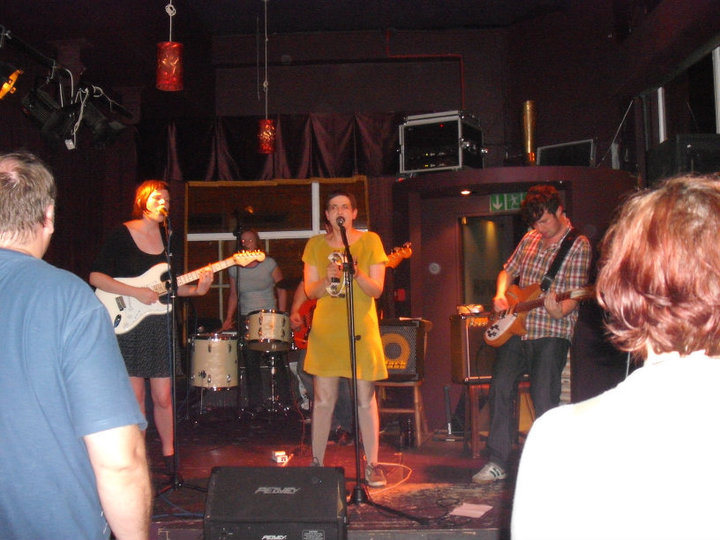
- Tender Trap playing in Liverpool, July 2010

Background information
- Origin: London, England, UK
- Genres: Indie pop Twee pop
- Years active: 2001–2014 (on hiatus)
- Labels: Fortuna Pop! K Records; Elefant Records; Matinée Recordings
- Spinoff of: Heavenly; Marine Research
- Past members: Amelia Fletcher; Katrina Dixon; Rob Pursey; Emily Bennett; John Stanley; Elizabeth Morris
- Website: http://www.myspace.com/tendertrap

Tender Trap were an English indiepop/twee pop band based in London, England, formed in 2001 by three of the five members of Marine Research - Amelia Fletcher, Rob Pursey, and John Downfall.

Amelia Fletcher and Rob Pursey were previously in the twee pop bands Talulah Gosh and Heavenly, and some have seen Tender Trap as representing a return to the pop aesthetic of those earlier bands. On their first, electronically slanted album Film Molecules, the songs demonstrate an eclectic mix of musical styles, with a clear nod to the similarly eclectic approach taken by The Magnetic Fields on their 69 Love Songs album. The band took their name from a line in the song "One Step Forward" by Even as We Speak.

The band's initial intention was to be a recording outfit only, due to their hatred of transporting drums from place to place. They compromised by playing live but using a CD player for backing beats. Additional live performers have included Claudia Gonson (of The Magnetic Fields) on drums, and Lupe Núñez-Fernández of Pipas and Amor de Días, who was a guest vocalist on the Language Lessons EP and the second album 6 Billion People.

After a quiet 2007–2008, Tender Trap reformed at the beginning of 2009 as a five-piece, with additional members Elizabeth Morris (also in Allo Darlin') on guitar and vocals and Katrina Dixon (formerly of Police Cat, Sally Skull and The Garden City Project) on drums and vocals. They performed on the main stage at Indietracks festival in Derbyshire in July 2009 and the indoor stage in July 2010. Elizabeth Morris left to concentrate on Allo Darlin' in August 2010 and Emily Bennett (Betty And The Werewolves) joined the following month on guitar and vocals.

In 2010, Tender Trap released Dansette Dansette, an album that finds Fletcher working with "up-and-coming British indie luminaries, rediscovering her musical beginnings, and continuing to incorporate and impart feminist consciousness through sharp, yet tender, pop songs"

In 2012 they released their latest album Ten Songs About Girls, amidst somewhat of a revival of the '80s and '90s indie pop sound.

As of 2014, the band is on indefinite hiatus, and Fletcher and Pursey now perform as The Catenary Wires.

== Discography ==
Albums

- Film Molecules (2002), K Records / Fortuna Pop! / Elefant Records
- 6 Billion People (2006), Fortuna Pop! / Matinée Recordings
- Dansette Dansette (2010), Fortuna Pop!
- Ten Songs About Girls (2012), Fortuna Pop!

EPs and Singles

- "Face of 73" 7" (2002), K Records
- "Oh Katrina" 7" (2002), Fortuna Pop!
- ¿Como Te Llamas? EP (2004), Elefant Records
- Language Lessons EP (2005), Matinée Recordings
- "Fireworks" CD / download single (2009), Fortuna Pop!
- "Do You Want a Boyfriend?" CD / 7" (2010), Fortuna Pop!
- "Dansette Dansette!" CD single (2010), Fortuna Pop!
- "Girls With Guns" CD single (2010), Fortuna Pop!
- "Step One" 7" (2012), Fortuna Pop!

Appearances

- Fields And Streams (2002), Kill Rock Stars
