= The Pooh Sticks =

Welsh indie pop band

- Origin: Swansea, Wales
- Genres: Indie pop
- Years active: 1987–1995, 2010–present
- Labels: Fierce Recordings; Woosh; Sympathy for the Record Industry; Cheree; Zoo Entertainment
- Members: Steve Gregory; Hue Williams

The Pooh Sticks were a Welsh indie pop band from Swansea, Wales, primarily recording between 1988 and 1995. They were notable for their jangly melodiousness and lyrics gently mocking the indie scene of the time, such as on "On Tape", "Indiepop Ain't Noise Pollution" and "I Know Someone Who Knows Someone Who Knows Alan McGee Quite Well". The band changed direction on their 1991 U.S breakthrough The Great White Wonder, eschewing the 'twee' British indie pop sound for a more American-styled power pop sound, akin to bands such as Jellyfish and Redd Kross. Subsequent albums included Million Seller, released on 11 January 1993, considered by some power pop fans to be the band's best work, and Optimistic Fool, released on 24 April 1995, followed in this style.

== Line-up ==
- Steve Gregory – producer, songwriter
- Hue Williams – vocals

Gregory and Williams invented a fictitious line-up which included:

- Trudi Tangerine – tambourine/piano
- Paul – guitar
- Stephanie Bass-Drum – drums
- Alison – bass

=== Guests ===
- Amelia Fletcher – vocals Orgasm, The Great White Wonder and Million Seller

== Discography ==
=== Albums ===
- 1988: Orgasm (53rd & 3rd Records)
- 1990: Formula One Generation (Fierce Recordings & Sympathy for the Record Industry)
- 1991: The Great White Wonder (Cheree Records & Sympathy for the Record Industry)
- 1993: Million Seller (Zoo Entertainment)
- 1995: Optimistic Fool (Seed Records)
- 2014: Think Bubble (recorded in 1995)

=== Live / compilation albums ===
- 1989: Trademark of Quality (Live album, reissued by Fierce Recordings in 1989)
- 1991: Multiple Orgasm (Reissue of Orgasm, Fierce Recordings)
- 1988: The Pooh Sticks (Fierce Recordings)
  - First press in black/white sleeve, second press in pink/white sleeve

=== Extended plays ===
- 1988: The Encore EP (Anonymous Records)

=== Singles ===
- 1988: "Heartbreak" (Fierce Recordings)
- 1988: "I Know Someone Who Knows Someone Who Knows Alan McGee Quite Well" (Fierce Recordings)
- 1988: "Indiepop Ain't Noise Pollution" (Fierce Recordings)
- 1988: "1-2-3 Red Light" (Fierce Recordings)
- 1988: "On Tape" (Fierce Recordings)
- 1989: "Hard On Love" (Woosh Records)
- 1989: "The Pure Styx" (Sympathy for the Record Industry)
- 1989: "Dying for It" (Fierce Recordings)
  - (First issue – group sleeve; second issue – "Altamont" sleeve)
- 1989: "Go Go Girl" (Cheree Records)
- 1989: "Tonight" (Sympathy for the Record Industry)
  - on Sympathy for the Record Industry
- 1991: "Who Loves You" (Cheree Records / Sympathy for the Record Industry)
- 1991: "Young People" (Cheree Records / Sympathy for the Record Industry) – A-side written by Andrew Griffiths and Hywel James of The Love Nazis
- 1991: "Who Loves You" (Sympathy for the Record Industry)
- 1991: "The Little White Wonder" (Fierce Recordings)
- 1991: "Who Loves You" (Fierce Recordings)
- 1992: "Could a Heart" (Sympathy for the Record Industry) (this 7" was entitled "Stickboy Contest Winners" and the track on the other side of the disc was by Gila Monsters entitled "Stickbastard")
- 1992: "The World Is Turning On" (Zoo Entertainment)
- 1995: "Cool in a Crisis" (Seed Records)
- 2012: "Formula One Generation" (Formosa Punk Records)

=== Compilation appearances ===
- 1990: "Time to Time", Becket House (Becket House)
- 1991: "Young People", Indie Top 20 Volume 13 (Beechwood Music)
- 1991: "Who Loves You", My Cheree Amour (Cheree Records)
- 1991: "True Life Hero", Revolution No. 9 (Pax Records)
- 1993: "Jelly on a Plate", Lime Lizard (Lime Lizard)
- 1993: "On Tape", Teenbeat 50 (Matador)
- 1993: "Million Seller", The Alternative Way – Everything Is Beautiful (Ariola Benelux)
- 1994: "Who Loves You", I Like It If You Feel Lucky (Beekeeper)
- 1995: "When the Night Falls", WTAG Radio Club – A Tag Recordings Sampler (Tag Recordings)
- 1998: "Soft Beds, Hard Battles", Their Sympathetic Majesties Request – A Decade of Obscurity and Obsoletes 1988–1998 (Sympathy for the Record Industry)
- 2000: "Indiepop Ain't Noise Pollution", The Sound of Leamington Spa, Volume 1 (Co-production between: TweeNet Communications, Bilberry Records, Firestation Tower Records) **23-Oct-2000
- 2004: "I Know Someone Who Knows Someone Who Knows Alan McGee Quite Well", Rough Trade Shops – Indiepop 1 (Mute Records Ltd.)
- 2006: "On Tape", CD86 – 48 Tracks from the Birth of Indie Pop (Castle Music)
- 2010: "Roll Over Easy", Indietracks – Indiepop Compilation 2010 (Make Do and Mend Records)

=== Radio sessions ===
- 1988: John Peel Session
- 1989: John Peel Session
- 1991: Mark Goodier Session
