= Hurrah! =

British jangle pop band

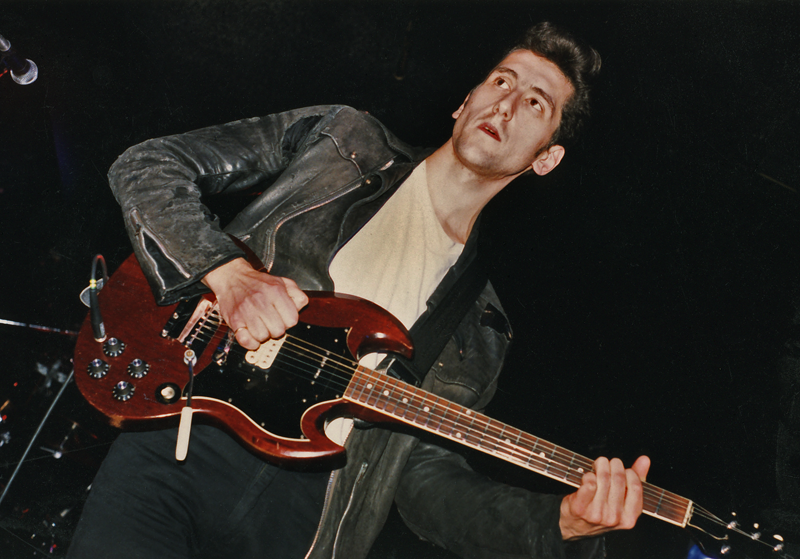
- Paul Handyside of Hurrah, onstage in Santa Clara, California – November 1987

Background information
- Origin: Newcastle Upon Tyne, England
- Genres: Jangle pop
- Years active: Early 1980s–1991
- Labels: Kitchenware, Arista
- Past members: Paul Handyside; David 'Taffy' Hughes; Mark Sim; Damien Mahoney; David Porthouse; Steve Price; Adrian Evans
- Website: hurrah.me.uk

Hurrah! were a British jangle pop band formed in the early 1980s and active until 1991. Two band members traded off lead vocals on track-by-track basis, giving the band two distinctly different sounds.

== Band history ==
=== Line-up ===
Formed in the early 1980s and originally known as the Green-Eyed Children, Hurrah! initially consisted of Paul Handyside (born 28 September 1960, Newcastle-upon-Tyne; guitar/vocals), David 'Taffy' Hughes (born 16 March 1961, Southmoor, Northumberland; guitar/vocals), David Porthouse (born 17 August 1961, Gateshead;(bass), and Mark Sim (drums). Sim was soon replaced by Damien Mahoney.

When Mahoney left in 1986 to join the police force, after exhaustive auditions, the band eventually recruited Steve Price (born 27 June 1965, Newport; drums) as a permanent replacement drummer. Adrian Evans (born 6 March 1963, County Durham, England) became the band's fourth drummer when Steve Price left the band and emigrated to America.

=== Releases ===
Hurrah! were one of the first acts signed to Kitchenware Records, who issued the band's debut single, "The Sun Shines Here", in 1982. Second single "Hip Hip" was released the following year, and gave the band an indie chart hit, reaching No. 21.

The third single, "Who'd Have Thought," was another indie hit in 1984, reaching No. 7 on the UK chart. After one more single, "Gloria" – produced by Jimmy Miller, the band's early recordings were compiled on the Boxed album in 1985.

Hurrah! signed to Arista Records via Kitchenware's deal with the major label, and the Tell God I'm Here album was re-released by the record company. On Arista's release, the future single "How Many Rivers" was re-recorded with new drummer Steve Price, and produced by Steve Brown.

In 1986, Hurrah! released their first major-label album and the single, "Sweet Sanity," in the UK and the US. The video for the song, which featured two women holding hands, was banned from some American television stations for being too controversial.

Hurrah's major label debut album, Tell God I'm Here, reached No. 71 in the UK Albums Chart in 1987. Towards the end of 1987, a live album, Way Ahead, was released on the Esurient label.

In 1989, the band released their second major-label album, The Beautiful, produced by Simon Hanhart and Chris Kimsey. The tracks were primarily recorded over six weeks in 1988 at Ridge Farm, a picturesque residential recording studio in Surrey, England. The only single from this album was "Big Sky."

Arista released Hurrah! from their record contract in 1989. Steve Price left the band in mid-1990 to move to America, and the rest of the band split up in 1991, after releasing their last single "That Dream's Over Now". A retrospective album of demos and live tracks, The Sound of Philadelphia, was issued in 1993. During the intervening years there was much talk of an unreleased 'lost album' of recordings made just before the 1991 split. This album was rumoured to feature previously unreleased material, which had been developed in the band's latter day live sets. Suspicions of this album's existence proved to be well founded, with the release of The Return of the Cool in 2010 on the Cherry Red record label.

=== Tours ===
The band were support for the Stranglers 'Dreamtime' Tour in March 1987, that culminated with three consecutive nights at the Hammersmith Odeon. They were invited to support U2 at Wembley, and played as the only opening act on the first few dates of The Joshua Tree tour in June 1987. Later that summer, Hurrah! played at a music festival in Germany, supporting David Bowie on the Glass Spider tour.

Hurrah! toured the United States for the first time during October/November 1987, appearing on the Coors-sponsored "Four Play" tour, along with bands Royal Court of China, Will (Sexton) & the Kill and Northern Pikes. The four bands rotated the headline slot, and played free shows at club venues and colleges in most major metro areas across the US.

In 1988, Hurrah! played live shows in Iraq, Egypt and Jordan after accepting an invitation from the British Arts Council. One of the first "western" bands to play in the Middle East, the group was escorted by armed troops for the duration of their visit. Publicity materials from their Arts Council tour listed the album's name as Tell Them I'm Here to avoid offending the host countries.

=== Post break-up ===
After Hurrah!, David 'Taffy' Hughes formed Star Witness, later called Candy Coloured Clowns, and released a cassette of rough demos called "Welcome to Razor Town" (1996). Hughes also plays guitar with The Girl with the Replaceable Head, a duo formed with female singer Sylvia.

Paul Handyside has since released two albums under the name of Bronze. His first solo album, Future's Dream, was released by Malady Music in 2007. Handyside's second solo album Wayward Son was released in 2013 also on Malady Music.

As well as contributing drums, melodeon and backing vocals on several of Paul Handyside's post-Hurrah! releases, David Porthouse trained as a luthier, producing custom built instruments and specialising in lap steel guitars.

== Discography ==
=== Albums ===
- Boxed (1985, Kitchenware)
- Tell God I'm Here (1987, Kitchenware/Arista) (UK Albums Chart No. 71)
- Way Ahead (1987, Esuriant) (UK Indie No. 29)
- The Beautiful (1989, Kitchenware/Arista)
- Sound of Philadelphia (1993, Creation Rev-Ola)
- The Return of the Cool (2010 Cherry Red)

=== Singles ===
- "The Sun Shines Here" (1982) Kitchenware
- "Hip Hip" (1983) Kitchenware (UK Indie No. 21)
- "Who'd Have Thought" (1984) Kitchenware (UK Indie No. 7)
- "Gloria" (1985) Kitchenware (UK Indie No. 12)
- "Sweet Sanity" (1986) Kitchenware/Arista (UK No. 83)
- "If Love Could Kill" (1987) Kitchenware/Arista (UK No. 76)
- "How Many Rivers?" (1987) Kitchenware/Arista (UK No. 125)
- "Sweet Sanity" (1988) Kitchenware/Arista (UK No. 197)
- "Big Sky" (1989) Kitchenware/Arista
- "That Dream's Over Now" (1991) Kitchenware/Arista
