= Cathy Rogers =

English broadcaster (born 1968)

- Born: Cathy Rogers; 29 May 1968 (age 58); Lancashire, England
- Education: University of Oxford
- Occupations: Executive, producer, presenter, musician
- Partner: Jason Gibb
- Children: 3

Cathy Rogers (born 29 May 1968) is an English television executive, producer, presenter and musician. She was the presenter of the British reality competition series Scrapheap Challenge and its American counterpart Junkyard Wars. She is also known for being the keyboardist and backing singer for the indie pop bands Heavenly and Marine Research. She has since trained as an educational neuroscientist.

Rogers was born in Lancashire, England. She studied medicine at the University of Oxford, earning a master's degree in Health Policy. Rogers joined the BBC as a producer in the early 1990s, specialising in scientific documentaries, including work on the long-running series Horizon. During the same period, she played keyboards and sang vocals in the twee pop group Heavenly.

In 1995 Rogers moved to the independent production company RDF Media, where she helped devise and produced the popular Channel 4 technology reality game show Scrapheap Challenge, known in North America as Junkyard Wars. She appeared onscreen as co-presenter of Scrapheap Challenge from the second series onwards until 2001 when Lisa Rogers (no relation) took over, and of Junkyard Wars for the first three series until replaced by Karyn Bryant. She also created and hosted a related programme, Full Metal Challenge. She continued her popular music career as well, playing with the Heavenly spinoff Marine Research in the late 1990s.

In 2001, Rogers was promoted to creative director at RDF Media's new Los Angeles centre, where she oversaw the company's activities in the United States, including the American versions of popular shows such as Faking It and Wife Swap. She then ran an olive farm in Loro Piceno, Italy, and set up a tree adoption scheme. She published an account of her time in Italy as The Dolce Vita Diaries. In 2009 she returned to RDF Media as creative director.

She subsequently completed a PhD in Educational Neuroscience at Birkbeck, University of London and has published an introduction to the field.
