= Scrapheap Challenge =

- Genre: Game show
- Created by: Eve Kay; Cathy Rogers
- Presented by: Sally Gray (pilot); Robert Llewellyn (series 1–10); Dick Strawbridge (series 11)
- Starring: Cathy Rogers (series 2–4); Lisa Rogers (series 5–10)
- Composers: Simon Lacey; Graham Reilly
- Country of origin: United Kingdom
- Original language: English
- No. of series: 11
- No. of episodes: 156

Production
- Running time: 60 minutes (inc. adverts)
- Production company: RDF Television

Original release
- Network: Channel 4
- Release: 12 April 1998 – 27 June 2010

Scrapheap Challenge is a British television show in which teams of contestants build a working machine that can perform a specific task, using materials available in a scrapyard. The series features teams of four or five members who are given ten hours (based around sunset) to build vehicles or machines to complete a specific task, such as a trebuchet, or complete a racecourse whilst acting as a gyroscope. The programme ran for eleven series and was originally shown on Channel 4. The format was exported to the United States, where it was known as Junkyard Wars. The American show was also produced by RDF Media, and was originally shown on The Learning Channel. Repeats have aired on another Discovery network, the Science Channel.

== Format ==
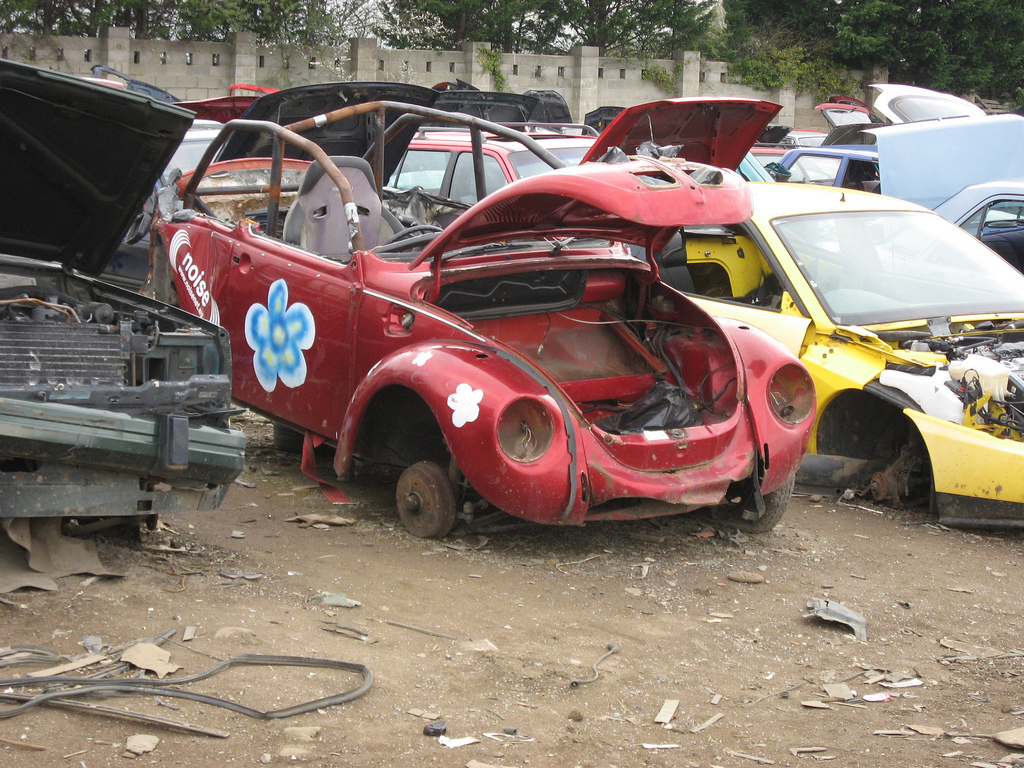
An example of the type of vehicles created for Scrapheap Challenge, the Green Goddesses VW Beetle

A typical episode featured a competition between two 4-person teams, each consisting of three regular members (with one designated the captain), plus an expert in the field related to the particular challenge. The judge for each episode is typically a specialist in (non-scrap) versions of the machine being constructed.

The challenges are many and varied, usually involving teams constructing a machine to achieve a particular objective. The final showdown usually consisted of either head-to-head races or individually run timed events. Examples of challenges included making a jet car, a bridging machine, a car-crusher, and a machine to fling a British Leyland Mini as far as possible.

Assistant producer Eve Kay had the idea for the show after watching a scene in the movie Apollo 13, where NASA engineers had only a short period of time to construct a carbon dioxide filter out of parts available on the space capsule. The show also drew its inspiration from the 1980s TV series The Great Egg Race.

== History and results ==
The UK pilot show was presented by Sally Gray with the first full series presented by Robert Llewellyn, joined in series 2–4 by producer Cathy Rogers, and in series 5–10 by Lisa Rogers (no relation). For series 11, both hosts were replaced by former Scrapheap contestant and judge Dick Strawbridge.

Series 1 was titled Scrapheap, and pitted the same two teams against each other each week. From series 2, the show was renamed Scrapheap Challenge and featured a knockout tournament between teams drawn from the general public. From series 3, a champion of champions contest was initiated.

Series 3 and 4 included a single US team in the field. Series 3 had The Nerds, and series 4 had The Mulewrights brought in at the last minute when The Barley Pickers were unable to travel due to the foot-and-mouth crisis. Both US teams made it to the final round.

- Series 1 (1998) – The series was tied 3–3
- Series 2 (1999) – Winners: Megalomaniacs
- Series 3 (2000) – Winners: Brothers in Arms; Champion of Champions: Megalomaniacs
- Series 4 (2001) – Winners: Cat-alysts; Champion of Champions: Cat-alysts
- Series 5 (2002) – Winners: Barley Pickers; Champion of Champions: Cat-alysts
- Series 6 (2003) – Winners: The Destroyers; Champion of Champions: Cat-alysts
- Series 7 (2004) – Winners: Anoraks; Champion of Champions: Anoraks
- Series 8 (2005) – Winners: Powerlifters; Champion of Champions: Powerlifters
- Series 9 (2007) – Winners: Woof Justice; Champion of Champions: Woof Justice
- Series 10 (2008) – Winners: Rusty Regiment; Champion of Champions: Woof Justice
- Series 11 (2009/10) – Winners: The Wheel Nuts; Champion of Champions: N/A

Series 9 was shown in two halves. The first eight episodes aired between 15 April and 3 June, the remaining episodes were between 4 November and 23 December 2007.

Series 11 saw Dick Strawbridge (formerly a competitor from series 1–3) return as an expert and judge, replacing Robert Llewellyn. The show was now produced by RDF Bristol and Executive producer Jane Lomas and series producer John Macnish had to deliver the new series on a fraction of the budget of previous series. As well as a change in presenters the format of the series was altered dramatically with teams of 'scrappers' from across the UK competing against Dick Strawbridge's home team known as 'Dick's Diamonds'. At the end of each episode a battle to determine the week's champion scrappers took place in a public venue in front of crowds of cheering fans. Series 11 of the UK show had its world premiere in Australia on ABC2, with episode 1 airing on 1 July 2009.

== Spin-offs ==
=== Full Metal Challenge ===
A spin-off from 2003 that had teams from around the world. Teams had a fixed budget and a month to build a vehicle to compete in a varied set of trials, such as auto "bowling", a race through a flooded course, a "car coaster", car "sumo" and other tests.

The winners were the Aquaholics from the UK. Hosted by Cathy Rogers and Henry Rollins, it lasted one season.

=== Scrappy Races (Rally) ===
Another spin-off series was instituted from 2004 to 2006 and was broadcast following the main series. It was also presented by Robert Llewellyn and Lisa Rogers.

It involved several teams being allocated a budget and several weeks to construct a road-legal vehicle which, if classified as a car, must pass the Single Vehicle Approval test. However, a few of the teams managed to avoid taking the SVA test, either by using an unmodified car chassis, such as the Chaos Crew in Series 2, who placed the body shell from an ice cream truck onto the unchanged chassis of a Range Rover, or by using their livelihood to classify their vehicle as agricultural equipment (The Barley Pickers in series 1). The teams then drove to various tests in-convoy across the UK where they were given eight hours at a local scrapheap to modify their vehicles for the test – although, for all but the final test, the vehicles had to be returned to road-legal condition afterwards. In Series 3, four teams were given vehicles and participated in 5 challenges in the Galloway Forest Park. They had to adapt the vehicles to perform two different tasks in each episode. This series was unusual for Scrapheap in that the build time was added together with the time taken to complete each stage.

- Series 1 (2004) – Winners: Chaos Crew
- Series 2 (2005) – Winners: Chaos Crew
- Series 3 (2006) – Winners: Maximus

== Transmissions ==
=== Series ===
Series	Start date	End date	Episodes
Pilot	12 April 1998		1
1	13 September 1998	18 October 1998	6
2	5 September 1999	17 October 1999	7
3	17 September 2000	19 November 2000	10
4	9 September 2001	25 November 2001	12
5	15 September 2002	8 December 2002	12
6	14 September 2003	30 November 2003	12
7	5 September 2004	21 November 2004	12
8	18 September 2005	4 December 2005	12
9	15 April 2007	3 June 2007	12
9	4 November 2007	25 November 2007	12
10	27 April 2008	13 July 2008	12
11	30 August 2009	25 October 2009	20
11	6 June 2010	27 June 2010	20

=== Specials ===
Date aired	Entitle
17 December 2000	Christmas Special
23 December 2001	Scrapheap Mega Challenge
15 December 2002	The Best of Scrapheap Challenge
22 December 2002	Scrapheap Mega Challenge
7 December 2003	The Best of Scrapheap Challenge
21 December 2003	Christmas Special
19 December 2004	Best Bits
16 January 2005	Top Ten Machines
6 February 2005	Favourite Fast Moments
11 December 2005	Punkin' Chunk
18 December 2005	Scrapheap Mega Challenge
8 January 2006	Scrapheap Challenge Roadshow
15 January 2006	The Best of Scrapheap Challenge
9 December 2007	Christmas Special (Part 1)
16 December 2007	Christmas Special (Part 2)
23 December 2007	Christmas Special (Part 3)
30 December 2007	Scrapheap Retrospective
27 July 2008	10th Anniversary Special
3 August 2008	Scrapheap Challenge Roadshow (Part 1)
10 August 2008	Scrapheap Challenge Roadshow (Part 2)
10 August 2008	Scrapheap Retrospective

== US version ==
The US version of the show was titled Junkyard Wars and was presented by George Gray (season 1) and Tyler Harcott (season 2–5), joined by Cathy Rogers (season 1–3) and Karyn Bryant (season 4–5).

- Season 1 (2001) – Winners: Long Brothers
- Season 2 (2001) – Winners: Miami Gearheads
- Season 3 (2002) – Winners: The Pit Crew
- Season 4 (2002) – Winners: Kentucky Fried Family
- Season 5 (2003) – Winners: Jet Doctors

Former North Dakota Governor Ed Schafer and future Kentucky Congressman Thomas Massie were two of many notable people to appear on the show. Schafer was on during the fifth season as a member of the High Flyers which lost to the Jet Doctors in the Fifth Series finale. The first season was filmed in the UK; it included a competition between the grand winner of UK series 3, Megalomaniacs and the US season 1 champions the Long Brothers (who won).

The first season of the show was nominated for an Emmy award.

The show was reformatted as Junkyard Mega-Wars to consist of two regular captains, who each select three people to help in the challenge. The show was presented by Rossi Morreale and Bobbi Sue Luther.

- Season 1 (2002) – Captains: Bowser and Crash
- Season 2 (2004) – Captains: Chris Hackett and (retired) Dick Strawbridge
