= Peter Momtchiloff =

British musician

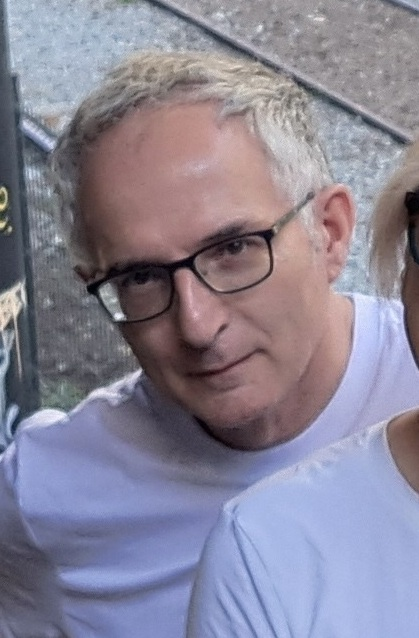
Momtchiloff in 2025

Peter Momtchiloff (born 10 March 1962) is a British guitarist and bassist.

He was educated at Winchester College and Worcester College, Oxford.

His musical career began in 1978 playing bass guitar in Winchester band The Big Figure. At Oxford he continued as a bass player and vocalist in Ron and His Beat Busters (under the name Miguel Horton) and Communist Alliance. These outfits played a combination of cover versions and original material with new wave, R&B and rockabilly influences. As a guitarist he played in country blues trio The Shovel Robinson King Biscuit Country Blue Band.

Momtchiloff was a founding member of the seminal twee pop bands Talulah Gosh, Heavenly, and its later incarnation Marine Research. In 1999, he joined Jessica Griffin in her band the Would-Be-Goods.

He has also played guitar for Scarlet's Well, Les Clochards, and Hot Hooves.

In 2014, he devised a band called Tufthunter to record an album of his songs, each sung by a different singer. This album was released in 2015 under the title Deep Hits. A second album of 'garage exotica', Dream Diary, was released in 2023.

From 1993 to 2023 Momtchiloff was Commissioning Editor for Philosophy at Oxford University Press. He is currently Associate Publication Consultant at Lex Academic.
