= Amelia Fletcher =

British singer, songwriter, guitarist, and economist

Amelia Fletcher CBE
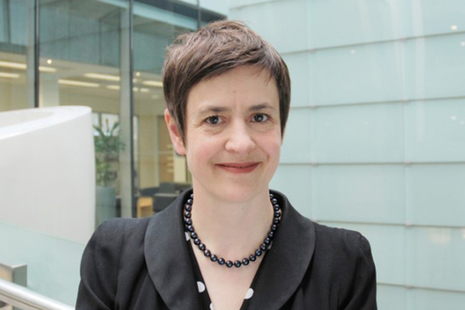
- Fletcher in 2017

Background information
- Born: 1 January 1966 (age 60)
- Origin: London, England, United Kingdom
- Genres: Indie pop
- Occupations: Singer, songwriter, guitarist, economist
- Years active: 1986–present
- Labels: Sarah; K; Wiiija; Elefant; Fortuna Pop!; Matinée

Amelia Fletcher CBE (born 1 January 1966) is a British singer, songwriter, guitarist and economist.

== Music career ==
Fletcher has been the frontwoman of an evolving series of pop groups from the 1980s to the present. Her bands included Talulah Gosh, Heavenly, Marine Research, Tender Trap, and, since 2014, The Catenary Wires. In 2020, she began a new band, Swansea Sound, with The Pooh Sticks's Hue Williams. She is associated with the twee pop scene. In 2025, she released an album of song-poems as The Catenary Wires with poet Brian Bilston.

She also sang backing vocals for The Wedding Present early in their career and on the Hefner album We Love the City. She toured with, and was guest vocalist for, The Pooh Sticks on their albums Orgasm, Million Seller and The Great White Wonder, and in 1988 released a single under her own name, "Can You Keep a Secret?" She has also appeared as a guest vocalist for The 6ths on the song "Looking for Love (In the Hall of Mirrors)", on “Monday Morning” by The Candyskins, on both Bugbear recordings, a single by The Hit Parade, and on the "Why Do You Have to Go Out With Him When You Could Go Out With Me?" single by The Brilliant Corners. From 1999 to 2003, she was keyboardist for Sportique. Amelia Fletcher was also an early promoter of Scottish group Bis who Heavenly performed alongside and whose lead singer, Manda Rin, repeatedly cited Amelia as one of her inspirations/influences.

With husband and long-time musical collaborator, Rob Pursey, she co-founded independent label, Skep Wax Records.

== Economics career ==
Fletcher read economics at St Edmund Hall, Oxford. In 1993, she completed a PhD in economics at Nuffield College, Oxford titled 'Theories of Self-Regulation'. In 2001, she was appointed Chief Economist at the Office of Fair Trading and in 2008 took on the additional role of Senior Director of Mergers. She left in April 2013, to become Professor of Competition Policy at the University of East Anglia. She has been a Non-Executive Director on the boards of the Financial Conduct Authority (2013–2020), Payment Systems Regulator (2014–2020), and Competition and Markets Authority (2016–2023).

Fletcher was appointed Officer of the Order of the British Empire (OBE) in the 2014 New Years Honours list for services to competition and consumer economics and Commander of the Order of the British Empire (CBE) in the 2020 Birthday Honours for services to the economy.
