= Talulah Gosh =

English guitar-pop group (1986–1988)

- Talulah Gosh (clockwise from top left: Mathew Fletcher, Elizabeth Price, Amelia Fletcher, Chris Scott, and Peter Momtchiloff).

Background information
- Origin: Oxford, England
- Genre: Indie pop
- Years active: 1986–1988
- Labels: Sarah, K, 53rd & 3rd
- Spinoffs: Heavenly; Tender Trap; Marine Research
- Past members: Amelia Fletcher; Mathew Fletcher; Peter Momtchiloff; Rob Pursey; Elizabeth Price; Chris Scott; Eithne Farry

Talulah Gosh were an English guitar-pop group from Oxford, and one of the leading bands of the indiepop movement. They released several singles and one compilation on independent record labels between 1986 and 1988. Members of the group later formed Heavenly.

AllMusic stated the opinion that Talulah Gosh are "perhaps the quintessential British twee pop band of the mid 1980s" as well as "avatars of the British twee pop movement". The site described the group's songs as "jangly and winsome" and likened the sound of Elizabeth Price and Amelia Fletcher's vocals to the spun sugar confection known as cotton candy. The band was initially formed with the intention of devising a "post-punk" answer to the girl group sounds of the 1960s.

== History ==
The band formed in 1986 after Amelia Fletcher and Elizabeth Price, both wearing Pastels badges, met at a club in Oxford. Their original line-up comprised Amelia Fletcher (vocals, guitar, principal songwriter), her younger brother Mathew Fletcher (drums), Peter Momtchiloff (lead guitar), Rob Pursey (bass), and Elizabeth Price (vocals). Pursey left early on, to be replaced by Chris Scott. They took their name from the headline of an NME interview with Clare Grogan.

The group made their live debut on 7 March 1986, and later the same year released a flexidisc on Sha La La flexi label and two singles simultaneously on the Edinburgh-based label 53rd & 3rd, "Beatnik Boy" and "Steaming Train". These singles, especially the former, were unashamedly cutesy, something also reflected in the names the group had adopted for themselves: leader Amelia was "Marigold", while Elizabeth became "Pebbles". Mathew Fletcher was rather less flatteringly nicknamed "Fat Mat". Their appearance led to them being labelled as an "anorak indie" band.

For their third single, the group returned to a song they had first recorded in a session for Janice Long's show on Radio 1 in August 1986, "Talulah Gosh". Elizabeth Price left toward the end of the year to form The Carousel with Razorcuts frontman Gregory Webster, and so the single, released on 30 May 1987, was the first to feature replacement Eithne Farry (vocals, tambourine). The single was less shambolic than their earlier offerings, and a video was made for it which was played on The Chart Show (then shown on Channel 4), giving the band some mainstream exposure. The single was produced (some critics suggested it was over-produced) by John Rivers, as was the follow-up "Bringing Up Baby", a sophisticated pop song that reduced the band's "shambling" element to the point where mainstream success seemed a possibility. Indeed, The Primitives would later take precisely this route to success – but Talulah Gosh never made the national chart. The ironically-titled debut (compilation) album Rock Legends: Volume 69 was released in October 1987, collecting tracks from the earlier singles and radio sessions.

January 1988 saw not only the release of "Bringing Up Baby" but also the broadcast of a second Radio 1 session, this time for DJ John Peel. What was to be Talulah Gosh's last single, a punk thrash titled "Testcard Girl" (very loosely based on an old Heinz advertising jingle), was released in May. The group split later that year. A post-breakup collection of BBC radio sessions was issued by Sarah Records in 1991, and a more comprehensive retrospective was released on K Records in 1996. A limited edition EP of demos, recorded in 1986, was issued for Record Store Day in 2011, at which point a new retrospective album was also announced, at that time to be called Grrrr. On 22 July 2013, Amelia Fletcher announced on her Facebook page that the album, now called Was It Just a Dream?, would be released in October 2013. It was launched along with a DJ set by Amelia Fletcher, Eithne Farry and Elizabeth Price at the London club Scared To Dance.

After the split, Peter joined Razorcuts, while Amelia issued a one-off solo single, "Can You Keep a Secret?". Amelia and Mathew Fletcher and Peter Momtchiloff regrouped as Heavenly in late 1989, with Talulah Gosh co-founder Rob Pursey also returning to the fold. Following the break-up of Razorcuts, Scott formed Saturn V with Gregory Webster and Razorcuts drummer Struan Robertson.

== Discography ==
=== Singles ===
- "I Told You So" (flexi disc, 1986) (given away with fanzines Are You Scared To Get Happy? No. 3 and Trout Fishing in Leytonstone No. 3)
- "Beatnik Boy" (single, 1986)
- "Steaming Train" (single, 1986)
- "Talulah Gosh" (single, 1987)
- "Bringing Up Baby" (single, 1987)
- "Testcard Girl" (single, 1988)
- "Demos EP" (single, 2011 – recorded 1986)

=== Compilations ===
- Rock Legends: Volume 69 (singles compilation, 1987/8 – reissued in 1991 as Talulah Mania)
- They've Scoffed the Lot (radio sessions, 1991)
- Backwash (complete recordings plus live tracks, 1996)
- Was It Just a Dream? (expanded version of Backwash adding demo tracks, 2013)
