= Sarah Records discography =

This is a discography of Sarah Records, a British independent record label active between 1987 and 1995.

== Discography ==
=== Singles ===
| Catalog number | Date | Artist | Title | Format | Notes |
|---|---|---|---|---|---|
| SARAH 1 | 1987-11 | The Sea Urchins | "Pristine Christine" | 7" | |
| SARAH 2 | 1988-01 | The Orchids | "I've Got a Habit" | 7" | |
| SARAH 3 | 1988 | Another Sunny Day | "Anorak City" | 5" flexi | |
| SARAH 4 | 1988 | N/A | untitled | fanzine | |
| SARAH 5 | 1988-04 | 14 Iced Bears | "Come Get Me" | 7" | |
| SARAH 6 | 1988 | The Poppyheads | "Cremation Town" | 7" | |
| SARAH 7 | 1988-07 | Another Sunny Day | "I'm in Love with a Girl Who Doesn't Know I Exist" | 7" | |
| SARAH 8 | 1988-07 | The Sea Urchins | "Solace" | 7" | |
| SARAH 9 | 1988 | The Golden Dawn | "My Secret World" | 7" | |
| SARAH 10 | 1988-07 | The Springfields | Sunflower EP | 7" | |
| SARAH 11 | 1988 | The Orchids | "Underneath the Window, Underneath the Sink" | 7" | |
| SARAH 12 | 1988-12 | The Field Mice | "Emma's House" | 7" | |
| SARAH 13 | 1989 | Christine's Cat | "Your Love Is..." | 5" flexi | |
| SARAH 14A | 1989 | N/A | Lemonade – A Fanzine | fanzines | |
| SARAH 14AA | 1989 | N/A | Cold – A Lie | fanzines | |
| SARAH 15 | 1989-02 | St. Christopher | "You Deserve More than a Maybe" | 7" | |
| SARAH 16 | 1989-05 | Another Sunny Day | "What's Happened?" | 7" | |
| SARAH 17 | 1989 | The Golden Dawn | "George Hamilton's Dead" | 7" | |
| SARAH 18 | 1989-02 | The Field Mice | "Sensitive" | 7" | |
| SARAH 19 | 1989-08 | Brighter | "Around the World in Eighty Days" | 7" | |
| SARAH 20 | 1989-07 | St. Christopher | "All of a Tremble" | 7" | |
| SARAH 21 | 1989 | The Wake | "Crush the Flowers" | 7" | |
| SARAH 22 | 1989-11 | Another Sunny Day | You Should All Be Murdered (Three Songs) | 7" | |
| SARAH 23 | 1989-09 | The Orchids | "What Will We Do Next?" | 7" | |
| SARAH 24 | 1990-01 | The Field Mice | The Autumn Store Part 1 | 7" | |
| SARAH 25 | 1990-01 | The Field Mice | The Autumn Store Part 2 | 7" | |
| SARAH 26 | 1990 | Gentle Despite | "Darkest Blue" | 7" | |
| SARAH 27 | 1990-02 | Brighter | "Noah's Ark" | 7" | |
| SARAH 28 | 1990 | Action Painting! | "These Things Happen" | 7" | |
| SARAH 29 | 1990-02 | The Orchids | "Something for the Longing" | 7" | |
| SARAH 30 | 1990-03 | Heavenly | "I Fell in Love Last Night" | 7" | |
| SARAH 31 | 1990-06 | Eternal | "Breathe" | 7" | |
| SARAH 32 | 1990 | N/A | Sunstroke | mini tenpenny fanzine | |
| SARAH 33 | 1990-08 | The Sea Urchins | "A Morning Odyssey" | 7" | |
| SARAH 34 | 1990-07 | St. Christopher | "Antoinette" | 7" | |
| SARAH 35 | 1990-06 | Another Sunny Day | "Rio" | 7" | |
| SARAH 36 | 1990 | The Sweetest Ache | "If I Could Shine" | 7" | |
| SARAH 37 | 1990 | Even as We Speak | "Nothing Ever Happens" | 7" | |
| SARAH 38 | 1990-09 | The Field Mice | "So Said Kay" | 10" | |
| SARAH 39 | 1990 | The Sweetest Ache | "Tell Me How It Feels" | 7" | |
| SARAH 40 | 1991-02 | The Springfields | "Wonder" | 7" | |
| SARAH 41 | 1991 | Heavenly | "Our Love Is Heavenly" | 7" | |
| SARAH 42 | 1991-01 | The Orchids | Penetration E.P. | 12" | |
| SARAH 43 | 1991 | Tramway | "Maritime City" | 7" | |
| SARAH 44 | 1991-03 | The Field Mice | "September's Not So Far Away" | 7" | |
| SARAH 45 | 1991 | Gentle Despite | "Torment to Me" | 7" | |
| SARAH 46 | 1991-05 | St. Christopher | "Say Yes to Everything" | 7" | |
| SARAH 47 | 1991 | The Sweetest Ache | "Sickening" | 7" | |
| SARAH 48 | 1991 | The Wake | "Major John" | 7" | |
| SARAH 49 | 1991-07 | Even as We Speak | One Step Forward EP | 7" | |
| SARAH 50 | 1991 | N/A | Saropoly | fanzine/board game | |
| SARAH 51 | 1991-07 | Heavenly | "So Little Deserve" | 7" | |
| SARAH 52 | 1991 | Tramway | "Sweet Chariot" | 7" | |
| SARAH 53 | 1991 | Secret Shine | "After Years" | 7" | |
| SARAH 54 | 1992 | Forever People | "Invisible" | 7" | |
| SARAH 55 | 1991-10 | Blueboy | "Clearer" | 7" | |
| SARAH 56 | 1991-10 | Brighter | "Half-Hearted" | 7" | |
| SARAH 57 | 1991-09 | The Field Mice | "Missing the Moon" | 12" | |
| SARAH 58 | 1991 | The Hit Parade | "In Gunnersbury Park" | 7" | |
| SARAH 59 | 1992 | Even as We Speak | "Beautiful Day" | 7" | |
| SARAH 60 | 1992-03 | Another Sunny Day | "New Year's Honours" | 7" | |
| SARAH 61 | 1992-03 | Secret Shine | Ephemeral | 7" | |
| SARAH 62 | 1992 | The Rosaries | Forever EP | 7" | |
| SARAH 63 | 1992-03 | The Sugargliders | "Letter from a Lifeboat" | 7" | |
| SARAH 64 | 1992 | Harvest Ministers | "You Do My World a World of Good" | 7" | |
| SARAH 65 | 1992-08 | Blueboy | "Popkiss" | 7" | |
| SARAH 66 | 1992-09 | The Orchids | "Thaumaturgy" | 7", CD | |
| SARAH 67 | 1992-10 | The Sugargliders | "Seventeen" | 7" | |
| SARAH 68 | 1992 | Harvest Ministers | "Six O'Clock Is Rosary" | 7" | |
| SARAH 69 | 1992-09 | Brighter | Disney | 10", CD | |
| SARAH 70 | 1993 | Blueboy | "Cloud Babies" | 6" flexi | |
| SARAH 70 | 1993 | N/A | just as good as I should be; nice boys prefer vanilla; i am telling you because you are far away | 3 mini-fanzines | |
| SARAH 71 | 1993 | Secret Shine | "Loveblind" | 7", CD | |
| SARAH 72 | 1993-03 | The Sugargliders | "Ahprahran" | 7", CD | |
| SARAH 73 | 1993 | Action Painting! | "Classical Music" | 7", CD | |
| SARAH 74 | 1993 | Blueboy | "Meet Johnny Rave" | 7", CD | |
| SARAH 75 | 1993 | East River Pipe | "Helmet On" | 7", CD | |
| SARAH 76 | 1993 | Boyracer | B Is for Boyracer | 7", CD | |
| SARAH 77 | 1993-07 | The Sugargliders | "Trumpet Play" | 7", CD | |
| SARAH 78 | 1993-05 | East River Pipe | "She's a Real Good Time" | 7", CD | |
| SARAH 79 | 1993-07 | Even as We Speak | "Blue Eyes Deceiving Me" | 7", CD | |
| SARAH 80 | 1993 | Blueboy | Some Gorgeous Accident EP | 7", CD | |
| SARAH 81 | 1993 | Heavenly | "P.U.N.K. Girl" | 7" | CD compiles both 7"s |
| SARAH 82 | 1993 | Heavenly | "Atta Girl" | 7", CD | CD compiles both 7"s |
| SARAH 83 | 1993-09 | The Sugargliders | "Will We Ever Learn" | 7", CD | |
| SARAH 84 | 1993 | Harvest Ministers | "If It Kills Me and It Will" | 7", CD | |
| SARAH 85 | 1993 | Boyracer | From Purity to Purgatory E.P. | 7", CD | |
| SARAH 86 | 1993-01 | The Sugargliders | "Top 40 Sculpture" | 7", CD | |
| SARAH 87 | 1993 | Action Painting! | "Mustard Gas" | 7", CD | |
| SARAH 88 | 1994-04 | Blueboy | "River" | 7", CD | |
| SARAH 89 | 1994 | Secret Shine | Greater than God E.P. | 7", CD | |
| SARAH 90 | 1994-05 | The Hit Parade | "Autobiography" | 7", CD | |
| SARAH 91 | 1994 | Ivy | "Wish You Would" | 7" | CD compiles both 7"s |
| SARAH 92 | 1994 | Ivy | "Avenge" | 7", CD | CD compiles both 7"s |
| SARAH 93 | 1994 | Aberdeen | "Byron" | 7", CD | |
| SARAH 94 | 1994-09 | Northern Picture Library | "Paris" | 7" | CD compiles both 7"s |
| SARAH 95 | 1994-10 | Northern Picture Library | "Last September's Farewell Kiss" | 7", CD | CD compiles both 7"s |
| SARAH 96 | 1994 | Boyracer | Pure Hatred 96 | 7", CD | |
| SARAH 97 | 1994 | Aberdeen | "Fireworks" | 7", CD | |
| SARAH 98 | 1995 | Shelley | "Reproduction Is Pollution" | 7", CD | |
| SARAH 99 | 1995-05 | Blueboy | "Dirty Mags" | 7", CD | |

=== Albums ===
| Catalog number | Date | Artist | Title | Format | Notes |
10"s
| Sarah 401 | 1989 | The Orchids | Lyceum | 10" | mini-album |
| Sarah 402 | 1989 | The Field Mice | Snowball | 10" | mini-album |
| Sarah 403 | 1990 | St. Christopher | Bacharach | 10" | mini-album |
| Sarah 404 | 1991 | Brighter | Laurel | 10", CD, CS | mini-album |
| Sarah 405 | 1993 | East River Pipe | Goodbye California | 10", CD | mini-album |
| Sarah 406 | 1995 | Harvey Williams | Rebellion | 10", CD | mini-album |
| Sarah 407 | 1995 | East River Pipe | Even the Sun Was Afraid | 10", CD | mini-album |
12"s
| Sarah 601 | 1990 | The Field Mice | Skywriting | LP | mini-album |
| Sarah 602 | 1990 | The Wake | Make It Loud | LP, CD, CS | mini-album |
| Sarah 603 | 1991 | Heavenly | Heavenly vs. Satan | LP, CD, CS | mini-album |
| Sarah 604 | 1991 | Talulah Gosh | They've Scoffed the Lot | LP | mini-album |
| Sarah 605 | 1991 | The Orchids | Unholy Soul | LP, CD | |
| Sarah 606 | 1991 | The Field Mice | Coastal | LP, CD, CS | compilation |
| Sarah 607 | 1991 | The Field Mice | For Keeps | LP, CD, CS | |
| Sarah 608 | 1992 | The Sweetest Ache | Jaguar | LP, CD, CS | |
| Sarah 609 | 1992 | The Sea Urchins | Stardust | LP, CD | compilation |
| Sarah 610 | 1992 | Heavenly | Le jardin de Heavenly | LP, CD, CS | |
| Sarah 611 | 1992 | The Orchids | Epicurean – A Soundtrack | LP, CD, CS | compilation |
| Sarah 612 | 1992 | Blueboy | If Wishes Were Horses | LP, CD | |
| Sarah 613 | 1992 | Another Sunny Day | London Weekend | LP, CD | compilation |
| Sarah 614 | 1993 | Even as We Speak | Feral Pop Frenzy | LP, CD | |
| Sarah 615 | 1993 | Secret Shine | Untouched | LP, CD | |
| Sarah 616 | 1993 | Harvest Ministers | Little Dark Mansion | LP, CD, CS | |
| Sarah 617 | 1994 | The Orchids | Striving for the Lazy Perfection | LP, CD | |
| Sarah 618 | 1994 | The Wake | Tidal Wave of Hype | LP, CD | |
| Sarah 619 | 1994 | The Sugargliders | We're All Trying to Get There | LP, CD | compilation |
| Sarah 620 | 1994 | Blueboy | Unisex | LP, CD | |
| Sarah 621 | 1994 | East River Pipe | Poor Fricky | LP, CD | |
| Sarah 622 | 1994 | The Hit Parade | The Sound of the Hit Parade | LP, CD | |
| Sarah 623 | 1994 | Heavenly | The Decline and Fall of Heavenly | LP, CD | |
| Compilations | | | | | |
| Sarah 587 | 1988 | Various artists | Shadow Factory – The Sarah Compilation | LP | compilation |
| Sarah 376 | 1990 | Various artists | Temple Cloud – A Sarah Compilation | LP | compilation |
| Sarah 545 | 1990 | Various artists | Air Balloon Road – A Sarah Compilation | CD | compilation |
| Sarah 501 | 1991-09 | Various artists | Glass Arcade – A Sarah Compilation | LP, CD, CS | compilation |
| Sarah 583 | 1992 | Various artists | Fountain Island – A Sarah Compilation | LP, CD | compilation |
| Sarah 628 | 1993 | Various artists | Engine Common – A Sarah Compilation | LP, CD | compilation |
| Sarah 530 | 1994 | Various artists | Gaol Ferry Bridge – A Sarah Compilation | LP, CD | compilation |
| Sarah 359 | 1995 | Various artists | Battery Point – A Sarah Compilation | LP, CD, CS | compilation |
| Sarah 100 | 1995 | Various artists | There and Back Again Lane | CD | compilation |
