= Her Handwriting =

Studio album by Trembling Blue Stars
- Released: May 1996
- Recorded: 31 October 1995–January 1996, Mitcham, South London
- Genres: Indie pop; electropop
- Length: 57:47
- Label: Shinkansen
- Producer: Bobby Wratten

Trembling Blue Stars chronology
Her Handwriting (1996)	Lips That Taste of Tears (1998)

Her Handwriting is the debut album by English indie pop band Trembling Blue Stars, released in May 1996 as the first album on Shinkansen Recordings. The album is an intimate song cycle centred on the romantic break-up of frontman Bobby Wratten and Anne Mari Davies, his former bandmate in the Field Mice and Northern Picture Library. After writing several songs about the break-up in early 1995 that Wratten believed to be messy, he discarded them, but engineer and musician Ian Catt persuaded him to record material based on the break-up in his own studios in Mitcham, South London, over the subsequent autumn and winter.

Musically, Her Handwriting blends indie pop and electronic music, and features dreamy guitars and ambient textures. The album was named after a lyric from the Go-Betweens and was promoted with the single "Abba on the Jukebox" ahead of the album's release, one of the less direct songs on the album, which was greeted with critical acclaim. Similar acclaim met the album when it was released the following month. Melody Maker later named it one of the year's best albums, and LTM Recordings re-released it in a new remastered with bonus tracks in 2006.

== Background and recording ==
During the later days of indie pop group the Field Mice, frontman and songwriter Robert "Bobby" Wratten and keyboardist Anne Mari Davies, already musical partners in the group, formed a romantic relationship just before that group disbanded in 1991; their last album, For Keeps, documented the start of their personal relationship. The couple formed Northern Picture Library in 1993, a band which former Field Mice drummer Mark Dobson soon joined, which moved the couple into a dub-influenced dream pop direction that nonetheless retained the jangle pop guitar sound from the Field Mice. Primarily studio-only artists at this point, Davies began suffering from stage fright, strong enough to make live performances impossible for her, and in some of the band's contemporary material, Wratten and Davies had begun questioning their relationship. Soon after, the couple split up, both romantically and as musical collaborators, thus also ending Northern Picture Library.

In the spring of 1995, a heartbroken Wratten, who had always used real life scenarios as inspiration for his songs, began writing his own songs about the break-up with the idea to release them as a mini-album under the new band name of Trembling Blue Stars for Sarah Records, but he found the songs to be "pretty much a mess. In the words of band biographer Michael Hill, "[Wratten] found himself unable to commit his feelings onto tape after giving it a couple of unsuccessful tries." Saint Etienne collaborator and engineer and long-time friend of Wratten, Ian Catt, persuaded Wratten to record in the studio Catt had created in his parents' home in Mitcham, South London, within easy reach of Wratten's home. On 31 October 1995, Wratten recorded the first song for Her Handwriting at the studio, "Do People Ever?", alongside a version of "Less than Love", which was unreleased until the album's 2006 remastered version.

Hill later reflected: "These were encouraging signs for Wratten. Working became cathartic, not debilitating. He was emboldened to write and develop material he had earlier feared he'd not be able to approach in any objective way, examining the circumstances of his breakup from every possible angle." The rest of the album was recorded at the studio between November 1995 and January 1996, mostly as a collaboration between Wratten and Catt, though Harvey Williams, Wratten's ex-Field Mice bandmate, played guitar on "Last Summertime's Obsession" and "For This One". He had composed the latter song and "A London Story" when Northern Picture Library were still active. Wratten also invited Davies to appear on the album, though she declined. Davies did however make a guest appearance on Trembling Blue Stars' second album Lips That Taste of Tears (1998), which lyrically continues the heartbreak themes of Her Handwriting.

== Music and lyrics ==
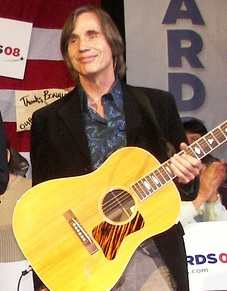
Folk singer Jackson Browne (pictured in 2005) was an influence on Her Handwriting.

Her Handwriting bridges together styles of indie pop and electronic music in a fashion that Michael Edwards of Exclaim felt "was a natural progression from the electronic experimentation of Northern Picture Library." The melancholic album incorporates pastoral, dreamy guitars and a muted ambient atmosphere, with "lush" electronics that have been compared to Saint Etienne. The record also bears the musical influence of Jackson Browne, especially in its usage of folk rock touches, elegant piano riffs and arrangements which build towards "heart-wrenching" musical and emotional crescendos, similarly to Browne's Late for the Sky (1974); Wratten even uses a lyrical snippet from Browne's "Sky Blue and Black" ("the far too simple beauty") on the song with the same name.

With its lyrics centred on Wratten and Davies' breakup, Her Handwriting has been described as an intimate song cycle. In the liner notes of the album's re-release, journalist Michael Hill compared the confessional lyrics of Her Handwriting to Joni Mitchell's Blue: "so startlingly specific in its narratives that one could practically retrace Bobby and Anne Mari's steps from the lyrical clues contained in a song like 'Abba on the Jukebox.' Yet, as with Mitchell, Wratten's work didn't feel unduly self-absorbed, just remarkably frank. He made palpable the joys and terrors of falling in - and out - of love. The details made his songs feel more authentic and compelling, familiar to anyone who's ever longed for another, especially someone determined to remain out of reach."

The seven-minute "Abba on the Jukebox" contains chintzy drum machine beats, a brief, high-toned guitar phrase and sighing backing vocals, with lyrics solely comprising a list of memories spent with a partner. Tom Ewing of Freaky Trigger said of the song's lyrics: "What Rob Wratten discovered with the Field Mice is that if you say something plainly enough, your words work harder and you can give the most ordinary phrases the emotional weight of novels. […] What he discovered with 'Abba on the Jukebox' is that you didn’t even have to go that far – what makes this song so poignant is that the loss between the lines, the knowledge that these things he's describing can't ever return or be remade, goes unmentioned." Jason Ankeny of AllMusic wrote that the song "easily captures the evocative grandeur of its title," while also highlighting "For This One" as shimmering "with breathtaking loveliness."

== Release and reception ==
Professional ratings
Review scores
Source	Rating
AllMusic	4/5 stars

Released in May 1996, Her Handwriting was the first album released on Shinkansen Recordings, an indie label newly established by Matt Haynes after retiring Sarah Records after 100 releases; an edited version of "Abba on the Jukebox" had been released as a single to critical acclaim the previous month. The album title references the lyric "that's her handwriting, that's the way she writes" from the Go-Between's song "Part Company" from their album Spring Hill Fair (1984). Wratten explained: "There was a couple of things on there that it is referencing. One is the Go Betweens which I like. It was also a nice name for the record as it was break up record." The album packaging is somewhat ambiguous with its lack of production credits or recording information; Hill later reflected:

"This was an album meant to be stumbled across, discovered serendipitously, claimed as one's own secret soundtrack. Its carefully crafted anonymity was part of what made it so tantalizing. The exquisitely simple package offered no photographs, production credits or information about where and when it was made, just a swirl of black and white drawings that seemed primitively symbolic, like something out of a vintage cinematic dream sequence."

Her Handwriting was released to unanimous acclaim from music critics. Melody Maker and NME featured pieces on the band, and the band were also invited by Mark Radcliffe to record a session for his BBC Radio 1 show on 2 July 1996. Vox compared the album's mood to Massive Attack's collaborations with Tracy Thorn, and hailed the album as one "with which to grow old and sad gracefully," while Mike Sutherland of the NME wrote that "Wratten's trademark blend of pastoral guitars and lush, Saint Etienne-esque electronics is fine-tuned to near perfection and even the hardest hearts find themselves whispering along to 'What Can I Say To Change Your Heart?'." The success turned Trembling Blue Stars from a one-off project into a fully fledged band; however, American journalist Michael Hill noted that, despite the great reviews, the album was a "success d'estime" at the time of its release, being commercially unsuccessful but slowly gaining a cult following via word of mouth praise.

In a retrospective review, Jason Ankeny of AllMusic highlighted the album as an "Album Pick", saying "few artists bare their souls quite so beautifully as Wratten, and the 14 tracks which make up Trembling Blue Stars' debut rank among his most sublime to date." He wrote that the album "possesses a stately elegance which allows Wratten to dangle on the brink of romantic despair but never allows him or his songs to lose their dignity." Michael Edwards of Exclaim! was favourable, saying "[w]hen it comes to break-up albums, it would be hard to imagine a more comprehensive one than Her Handwriting." He felt the songs' document the end of Wratten's relationship "in a way that had to be cathartic for Wratten or else he would never have recorded such personal moments for the entire world to hear. It never crosses the line into self-indulgence even though there are times where it can make for uncomfortable listening."

Melody Maker ranked the album at number 23 in their list of the 50 best albums of 1996. "Abba on the Jukebox" was ranked number 19 in the 1996 edition of John Peel's Festive Fifty, an annual listeners' poll of the best songs of the year, and in 1999, Tom Ewing of Freaky Trigger ranked it at number 15 in his list of the "Top 100 Singles of the 90s," who called it "a coming-to-terms: the song's litany of places, snapshot moments and tiny private actions is a way to map out a love by looking at its edges, to understand the shape of something too bright and raw for direct inspection." The album has been seen as influential; Edwards reflected that, "[a]lways ahead of his time, [Wratton] was bringing together indie pop and electronic music before it was cool to do so," while Hill posed Give Up (2003) by The Postal Service as a "direct descendant" of Her Handwriting. LTM Recordings released a 74-minute remastered version with three bonus tracks in 2006.

== Track listing ==
All songs written by Bobby Wratten.

1. "A Single Kiss" – 3:08
2. "For This One" – 4:41
3. "What Can I Say To Change Your Heart?" – 5:56
4. "Abba On The Jukebox" – 7:22
5. "The Far Too Simple Beauty" – 3:31
6. "Less Than Love" – 4:28
7. "Less Than Love (Reprise)" – 0:28
8. "Do People Ever?" – 3:42
9. "Last Summertime's Obsession" – 4:12
10. "A London Story" – 5:14
11. "Saffron, Beautiful And Brown-Eyed" – 4:26
12. "Nobody But You" – 2:26
13. "Two Octobers" – 1:26
14. "To Keep Your Heart Whole" – 6:45

== Personnel ==
- Bobby Wratten – writing
- Ian Catt – engineer
