= So Said Kay =

EP by the Field Mice
- Released: September 1990
- Genre: Indie pop; twee pop
- Label: Sarah

The Field Mice chronology
| The Autumn Store Part 2 (1990) | So Said Kay (1990) | September's Not So Far Away (1991) |

So Said Kay is an EP by the Field Mice. It was released as a 10" vinyl record.

It was the first EP release (as opposed to mini-album) by Sarah Records that was issued as a 10-inch format, because the band wanted to release the five songs on one single vinyl record as opposed to previously spread across two 7-inch vinyl records (as in 1990's The Autumn Store, Part 1 and 2.

The 1990 EP showcases an even more melancholic/romantic side to the songwriting of chief Field Mice Bobby Wratten and Michael Hiscock, featuring some of their most poignantly yearning lyrics and instrumentation coupled with a glistening, almost crystalline, production by Ian Catt. The title track references the lesbian romance Desert Hearts, with the lyrics drawn from dialogue from the film and a description of events occurring within it.

It is often regarded as one of the finest recordings from the band, whose short life only extended to one more single (1991's "Missing the Moon") and album (For Keeps released the same year) before they disbanded amid some considerable acrimony during a short UK tour.

== Track listing ==
10" EP (SARAH 038)

1. "Landmark" – 5:08
2. "Quicksilver" – 5:02
3. "Holland Street" – 2:52
4. "Indian Ocean" – 5:04
5. "So Said Kay" – 5:54
