= Julian Knowles (composer) =

- Born: 31 July 1965 (age 60); Australia
- Genres: Ambient, indie, postdigital, electronic
- Occupations: Composer, guitarist, record producer, music theorist
- Instruments: Electronics, electric guitar, keyboards
- Years active: 1987–present
- Labels: Phantom Records; Sarah Records; Extreme Records; Preservation Records; Endgame Records; Emotional Response Records
- Website: http://www.julianknowles.net

Julian Knowles (born 31 July 1965) is an Australian composer and performer, specialising in new and emerging technologies. His creative work spans the fields of composition for theatre, dance, film and television, electronic music, sound and new media arts, popular music and record production. Since the mid-1980s, he has established himself as a prominent artist in the area of electronic and new music, achieving significant critical recognition for his performances and recordings.

Although working primarily as a solo artist, he has been a member of the experimental sound art ensemble Social Interiors since the early 90s and has collaborated with a wide range of Australian and international artists. In recent years, his work has been presented at venues and events such as the San Francisco Museum of Modern Art, Experimental Intermedia in New York City, the Seoul International Performance Art Festival, The Melbourne International Film Festival, What Is Music, Electrofringe, the Sydney Opera House, the International Computer Music Conference, and a range of major arts venues.

Knowles has an extensive background in the popular music area, having been involved in the Australian and UK independent music scenes from the mid-1980s onwards as a performer, programmer and producer in bands such as The Shrinking Violets (guitar, keyboards, production), Even As We Speak (guitar, keyboards, production) and Dutiful Daughters (bass guitar); Even As We Speak achieved multiple top 10s in the UK independent charts (NME/Melody Maker) during the 1990s. The band were one of only five Australian bands ever to record radio sessions with British DJ, John Peel, on BBC Radio 1. He also appeared as a guest artist on releases by Big Heavy Stuff and Swirl.

In 1994 Knowles took up a position on the foundation staff of a new music program at the University of Western Sydney. In this role he established and steered a new major in music technology and played a key role in the establishment of the Electronic Arts program. In 2002, he was appointed to the position of Head of the School of Contemporary Arts. In 2005 he was appointed Professor of Music and Head, School of Music and Drama at the University of Wollongong. In 2007 he took up a position as Professor in Music at the Creative Industries Faculty at Queensland University of Technology where he is the co-director of the Independent Music Project and a researcher within the Institute for Creative Industries and Innovation.

Since 2007, Knowles has been Chair of Q Music, the peak body for the music industry in Queensland and a director of the Music Council of Australia. From 2003 to 2007, he was a member of the Music Board of the Australia Council for the Arts, the Australian Government's Arts funding and advisory body.
