= Sensitive =

Sensitive may refer to:

- Mister Sensitive, Murat Demir, a fictional character
- Psychic, a person who professes an ability to perceive information through extrasensory perception
- "Sensitive" (song), a 1989 song by The Field Mice
- "Sensitive", a 2022 song by Meghan Trainor from the album Takin' It Back
- "Sensitive", a 1983 song by Re-Flex from the album The Politics of Dancing
- "Sensitive", a 2016 song by Robbie Williams from the album The Heavy Entertainment Show

== See also ==
- Sensitivity (disambiguation)
