= The Sugargliders =

Australian indie pop band

- Origin: Melbourne, Australia
- Genres: Indie pop, Indie rock
- Years active: 1989–1994
- Labels: Summershine; Sarah Records
- Spinoffs: The Steinbecks
- Past members: Josh Meadows; Joel Meadows

The Sugargliders were an indie pop band from Melbourne, Australia, comprising brothers Josh and Joel Meadows and a changing lineup of other players. Between February 1989 and June 1994 they played more than 90 live shows in Australia and the UK and released ten singles and one compilation album. After disbanding The Sugargliders the Meadows brothers re-emerged in The Steinbecks.

== History ==
Josh Meadows was 19 years old and his brother Joel was 16 when they first started playing gigs in Melbourne pubs under the name The Sugargliders. The brothers were fans of Billy Bragg, The Housemartins, The Smiths, Aztec Camera, Lloyd Cole and Orange Juice, and these influences were evident in their guitar-based pop. Their early songs featured simple arrangements, with only sparse drum or drum machine backing and lyrics that dealt with political subjects as often as they did with unrequited love.

The Sugargliders got their start playing support for Melbourne bands Captain Cocoa, Ripe and the Fish John West Reject. They developed a devoted following through regular live performances, a constantly evolving set of original material and the support of Melbourne independent radio stations and street press. The band's sound developed with the addition of Marc Fulker on drums (in 1991–1992) and Robert Cooper on bass (1992–1994).

The band became known for its unique blend of sparse, melodic pop and lyrics that were described as "disarmingly naïve" and "like eavesdropping on another's secrets". Steve L Burt wrote that "The last person to comment so incisively, and with such a sense of having been hurt, on boy-girl stuff may have been the early Elvis Costello; but where he always blamed his ex-girlfriends, the Sugargliders always blame themselves".

They released three singles for hip Melbourne label Summershine Records in 1990 and 1991 and one for UK's Marineville before finding a home at legendary Bristol pop stable Sarah Records in 1992.

The Sugargliders toured England in late 1992, playing shows with Sarah Records label mates Boyracer, Heavenly, Blueboy, Brighter and others. While in London they recorded their seventh and most well-known single "Ahprahran", a melancholy lament about inner Melbourne suburb Prahran, with producer Ian Catt.

Back in Australia, The Sugargliders' live line-up often included Robert Cooper (bass), Adam Dennis (trumpet, guitar) and Bianca Lew (drums). This was to become the first line-up of the Meadows brothers' next band, The Steinbecks.

Tired of being pigeonholed as acoustic pop, the brothers decided to end the band in mid-1994. Music press interviews reveal some of the thinking behind the decision. "The Sugargliders were developing into something which involved a whole lot more people," Joel told Cameron Adams from Beat in November 1994. "We had a choice of trying to change The Sugargliders or make a clean break and start something new.".

The band was quiescent for nearly two decades until Melbourne label Popboomerang convinced Josh and Joel that it was time to make the best Sugargliders material available widely again. The brothers curated a retrospective album "Nest with a view 1990-1994", complete with extensive liner notes. The album was released in 2012 through Popboomerang in Australia and Matinée Records in the USA. No future performances by The Sugargliders are planned, however a launch event featured short sets from artists associated with the band, with each artist performing one cover of a Sugargliders song.

== Discography ==
=== Singles ===
- 1990 - "Sway" (Shine 004)
- 1991 - "Furlough/Give Me Some Confidence" (Shine 007)
- 1991 - "Butterfly soup" (Shine 012)
- 1991 - "Another Faux Pas In The Cathedral Of Love" (Marine 3)
- 1992 - "Letter From A Lifeboat" (Sarah 63)
- 1992 - "Seventeen" (Sarah 67)
- 1993 - "Ahprahran" (Sarah 72)
- 1993 - "Will We Ever Learn?" (Sarah 83)
- 1993 - "Trumpet Play" (Sarah 77)
- 1993 - "Top 40 Sculpture" (Sarah 86)

=== Compilations ===
- 1994 - "We're All Trying To Get There" (Sarah 619)
- 2012 - "A Nest With A View 1990-1994" (Popboomerang PB085)
