= Coastal (The Field Mice album) =

Compilation album by The Field Mice
- Released: 1991
- Genre: Indie pop, twee pop, jangle pop
- Length: 62:39
- Label: Sarah Records

The Field Mice chronology
| Skywriting (1990) | Coastal (1991) | For Keeps (1991) |

Professional ratings
Review scores
| Source | Rating |
|---|---|
| Allmusic | 4/5 stars |
| NME | (7/10) |
| Q | 4/5 stars |

Coastal is a compilation album by The Field Mice.

This is a best-of collection featuring a selection of Field Mice singles, EP and album tracks from 1988 to 1991. The minimalist cover, as with other Field Mice releases such as "Snowball" and "So Said Kay EP", is an intentional nod to Factory Records' designs for the likes of New Order (to which this album's design owes a significant debt to the latter's singles compilation "Substance"). Bobby Wratten of the band has always expressed his admiration of New Order and Factory Records' often minimalistic sleeve design concepts.

== Track listing ==
1. "September's Not So Far Away" – 6:13
2. "So Said Kay" – 5:05
3. "The Last Letter" – 2:44
4. "Sensitive" – 5:05
5. "This Love Is Not Wrong" – 3:21
6. "If You Need Someone" – 3:44
7. "Anyone Else Isn't You" – 4:12
8. "Couldn't Feel Safer" – 3:46
9. "Let's Kiss and Make-up" – 6:10
10. "Below the Stars" – 5:35
11. "Quicksilver" – 5:01
12. "When Morning Comes to Town" – 5:16
13. "It Isn't Forever" – 6:01
14. "Between Hello and Goodbye" – 2:27
