= The Autumn Store Part 1 =

Single by the Field Mice
- A-side: "If You Need Someone"
- B-side: "The World to Me"
- Released: January 1990
- Genre: Indie pop; twee pop
- Label: Sarah

The Field Mice singles chronology
| "I Can See Myself Alone Forever" (1989) | "The Autumn Store Part 1" (1990) | "The Autumn Store Part 2" (1990) |

"The Autumn Store Part 1" is a single by the Field Mice, featuring the song "If You Need Someone" on the A-side and "The World to Me" on the B-side. It was released as a 7" vinyl record in 1990, through Sarah Records.

== Track listing ==
7" single (SARAH 024)

1. "If You Need Someone" – 3:46
2. "The World to Me" – 3:41
