= Unholy Soul =

Studio album by The Orchids
- Released: May 1991
- Recorded: Glasgow, 1991
- Genre: Twee pop, dream pop, jangle pop
- Label: Sarah Records
- Producer: Ian Carmichael

Professional ratings
Review scores
Source	Rating
Allmusic	link

Unholy Soul is the second album by The Orchids, released in 1991.

The album contains an unlisted track "Definition of a Bastard" which comes after track 7. The original CD numbering however did not take this into account and so from track 7 onwards the numbers and tiles do not correlate; and "Waiting for the Storm" has no ident at all. As was usual for albums on Sarah Records, no singles were released from it. The later 2005 reissue contained two singles.

"A beautiful album – timeless melodies for sure." (Melody Maker, 1991)

== Track listing ==
1. "Me and the Black and White Dream"
2. "Women Priests and Addicts"
3. "Bringing You the Love"
4. "Frank De Salvo"
5. "Long Drawn Sunday Night"
6. "Peaches"
7. "Dirty Clothing"
8. "Moon Lullaby"
9. "Coloured Stone"
10. "The Sadness of Sex (Part 1)"
11. "Waiting for the Storm"
12. "You Know I'm Fine"

=== 2005 re-issue ===
1. "Me and the Black and White Dream"
2. "Women Priests and Addicts"
3. "Bringing You the Love"
4. "Frank De Salvo"
5. "Long Drawn Sunday Night"
6. "Peaches"
7. "Dirty Clothing"
8. "Moon Lullaby"
9. "Coloured Stone"
10. "The Sadness of Sex (Part 1)"
11. "Waiting for the Storm"
12. "You Know I'm Fine"
13. "Bemused, Confused and Bedraggled" – From "Penetration" EP, Sarah Records, February 1991
14. "Pelican Blonde" – From "Penetration" EP
15. "Tropical Fishbowl" – From "Penetration" EP
16. "How Does That Feel" – From "Penetration" EP
17. "Sigh" – From "Penetration" EP
18. "Something for the Longing" – Single A-side, Sarah Records, February 1990
19. "Farewell Dear Bonnie" – Single B-side
20. "On a Sunday" – Single B-side
