= Lyceum (album) =

Studio album by The Orchids
- Released: August 1989
- Recorded: Glasgow, 1989
- Genre: Twee pop
- Label: Sarah Records
- Producer: The Orchids and Ian Carmichael

Professional ratings
Review scores
Source	Rating
Allmusic	link
NME	(7/10) link

Lyceum is an album by The Orchids, released on Sarah Records in 1989.

It was the first album release by the group (and also by the label) and was originally only available as an 8 track, 10" mini-album on vinyl. As was usual for albums on Sarah Records, no singles were released from it, although the later 2005 reissue contained all the early singles.

It was reviewed in Melody Maker as "Another fountainhead of unqualified greatness".

== Track listing ==
1. "It's Only Obvious"
2. "A Place Called Home"
3. "Caveman"
4. "York Song"
5. "Carrole-Anne"
6. "Hold On"
7. "Blue Light"
8. "If You Can't Find Love"

=== 2005 re-issue ===
1. "It's Only Obvious"
2. "A Place Called Home"
3. "Caveman"
4. "York Song"
5. "Carrole-Anne"
6. "Hold On"
7. "Blue Light"
8. "If You Can't Find Love"
9. "I've Got a Habit" – First single on Sarah Records, 1988
10. "Apologies" – Single B-side
11. "Give Me Some Peppermint Freedom" - from Shadow Factory compilation, Sarah Records 1989
12. "Defy the Law " - From "Underneath the Window" EP, Sarah Records 1988
13. "Underneath the Window, Underneath the Sink" - From "Underneath the Window" EP
14. "Tiny Words" - From "Underneath the Window" EP
15. "Walter" - From "Underneath the Window" EP
16. "What Will We Do Next" - What Will We Do Next Single A-side Sarah Records 1989
17. "As Times Goes By" - What Will We Do Next Single B-side
18. "Yawn" - What Will We Do Next Single B-side
19. "Ill Wind That Blows" - 7" A-side, Caff 1990
20. "All Those Things" - 7" B-side, Caff 1990
