= Epicurean (disambiguation) =

Epicureanism is a system of philosophy developed by Epicurus ca. 300 BCE.

Epicurean or epicure may also refer to:

- Epicure (gourmet), a person interested in food, sometimes with overtones of excessive refinement
- The Epicurean, 1827 novel written by Thomas Moore
- Epicurean paradox, an argument about the problem of reconciling evil with an omnipotent deity
- Marius the Epicurean, 1885 philosophical novel written by Walter Pater
- Epicurean (supermarket), a supermarket chain in Antigua and Barbuda

== Music ==
- Epicurean (album), a compilation of early work by The Orchids, released by Sarah Records in 1992
- Epicure (band), an Australian rock band
- Épicure (opera), an 1800 opera

== See also ==
- Epicurious, a brand and web site dedicated to food and cooking
- Epicurus (341 BC – 270 BC), ancient Greek philosopher
