= The Autumn Store Part 2 =

Single by the Field Mice
- A-side: "Song Six"
- B-side: "Anyone Else Isn't You"; "Bleak"
- Released: January 1990
- Genre: Indie pop; twee pop
- Label: Sarah

The Field Mice singles chronology
"The Autumn Store Part 1" (1990)	"The Autumn Store Part 2" (1990)	"So Said Kay" (1990)

"The Autumn Store Part 2" is a single by the Field Mice, featuring the song "Song Six" on the A-side and the songs "Anyone Else Isn't You" and "Bleak" on the B-side. It was released as a 7" vinyl record in 1990, through Sarah Records.

== Track listing ==
7" single (SARAH 025)

1. "Song Six" – 5:01
2. "Anyone Else Isn't You" – 4:12
3. "Bleak" – 5:07
