= Striving for the Lazy Perfection =

Studio album by The Orchids
- Released: January 1994
- Recorded: June–October 1993
- Venue: Glasgow
- Genre: Indie pop, twee pop, chamber pop
- Label: Sarah
- Producer: Ian Karmichael

Professional ratings
Review scores
| Source | Rating |
|---|---|
| Allmusic | 4.5/5 stars |
| Melody Maker | (favourable) |

Striving for the Lazy Perfection is an album by The Orchids, released in 1994. It was the last release by the group before they split up the following year.

Striving for The Lazy Perfection was the group's third album (excluding the compilation Epicurean) and its mixture of musical styles was heavily at odds with the usual perception of Sarah Records as a twee pop label. With the assistance of long-serving producer Ian Carmichael (also a member of the dance music group One Dove), the group recorded an album which took in styles ranging from their traditional melancholy guitar pop to rock numbers with a harder edge, upbeat pop songs and dancefloor-friendly electronic music.

As was usual for albums on Sarah Records, no singles were released from it, though the title track did appear on a split 7-inch on the Bring On Bull label. Although the 7-inch fades out early, it is otherwise the same version as appears on the album.

The album was well received by critics but sold poorly at the time. It was reissued in 2005 with five bonus tracks. A music video, featured on The Orchids' official YouTube channel, was later produced for the title track using footage of the Cannondale Pro Cycling Team synchronised to the music.

== Track listing ==
1. "Obsession N° 1" – 3:57
2. "Striving For The Lazy Perfection" – 3:56
3. "The Searching" – 3:25
4. "Welcome To My Curious Heart" – 4:40
5. "Avignon" – 3:02
6. "A Living Ken And Barbie" – 6:36
7. "Beautiful Liar" – 3:46
8. "A Kind Of Eden" – 4:15
9. "Prayers To St Jude" – 2:52
10. "Lovechild" – 4:51
11. "Give A Little Honey" – 4:31
12. "I've Got To Wake Up To Tell You My Dreams" – 3:38
13. "The Perfect Reprise" – 1:34

The US release included "I Was Just Dreaming" and "Between Sleeping and Waking".

=== 2005 re-issue ===
1. "Obsession N° 1" – 3:57
2. "Striving For The Lazy Perfection" – 3:56
3. "The Searching" – 3:25
4. "Welcome to My Curious Heart" – 4:40
5. "Avignon" – 3:02
6. "A Living Ken And Barbie" – 6:36
7. "Beautiful Liar" – 3:46
8. "A Kind of Eden" – 4:15
9. "Prayers to St Jude" – 2:52
10. "Lovechild" – 4:51
11. "Give a Little Honey" – 4:31
12. "I've Got to Wake Up to Tell You My Dreams" – 3:38
13. "The Perfect Reprise" – 1:34
14. "Thaumaturgy" - From "Thaumaturgy" Single A-side, Sarah Records, September 1992
15. "I Was Just Dreaming" - Single B-side
16. "Between Sleeping and Waking" - Single B-side
17. "It's Ours" - Unreleased demo
18. "The Letter" - Unreleased demo
