= Where'd You Learn to Kiss That Way? =

Compilation album by The Field Mice
- Released: 1998
- Genre: Indie pop, twee pop
- Label: Shinkansen Recordings

The Field Mice chronology
For Keeps (1991)	Where'd You Learn to Kiss That Way? (1998)

Professional ratings
Review scores
Source	Rating
Allmusic	link

Where'd You Learn to Kiss That Way? is a compilation album by The Field Mice.

== Track listing ==
Disc 1

1. "Five Moments" – 5:16
2. "If You Need Someone" – 3:43
3. "Sensitive" – 5:02
4. "Couldn't Feel Safer" – 3:44
5. "Below the Stars" – 5:32
6. "Coach Station Reunion" – 3:07
7. "Everything About You" – 2:23
8. "It Isn't Forever" – 5:59
9. "Between Hello and Goodbye" – 2:26
10. "And Before the First Kiss" – 5:53
11. "Tilting at Windmills" – 4:35
12. "Missing the Moon" – 6:59
13. "Let's Kiss and Make Up" – 6:09
14. "Triangle" – 6:06
15. "Canada" – 3:25
16. "Anyone Else Isn't You" – 4:11
17. "September's Not So Far Away" – 4:11

Disc 2

1. "Emma's House" – 3:36
2. "Landmark" – 5:08
3. "Willow" – 4:20
4. "Holland Street" – 2:51
5. "Clearer" – 3:54
6. "Quicksilver" – 4:59
7. "Star of David" – 5:20
8. "When Morning Comes to Town" – 5:14
9. "The Last Letter" – 2:43
10. "Indian Ocean" – 5:04
11. "This Love Is Not Wrong" – 3:18
12. "Fabulous Friend" – 2:52
13. "White" – 4:47
14. "When You Sleep" – 3:32
15. "An Earlier Autumn" – 2:01
16. "End of the Affair" – 4:12
17. "This Is Not Here" – 5:11
18. "A Wrong Turn and Raindrops" – 4:20
19. "So Said Kay" – 5:04

The version of "Triangle" on this compilation fades out nearly three minutes earlier than its original appearance on Skywriting. In addition, "This Is Not Here" (which originally appeared on For Keeps) is mixed differently and has a newly recorded (1998) vocal track.
