= Emma's House =

Single by The Field Mice
- Released: November 1988
- Genre: Indie pop, twee pop
- Label: Sarah Records

The Field Mice singles chronology
"Emma's House" (1988)	"Sensitive" (1989)

"Emma's House" is the debut single by the Field Mice. It was released as a 7" vinyl record on Sarah Records in November 1988. It reached number 20 on the UK Independent Chart in December that year.

The title track was included in Pitchfork 500 : Our Guide to the Greatest Songs from Punk to the Present.

== Track listing ==
7" Single (SARAH 012)

1. "Emma's House" – 3:36
2. "When You Sleep" – 3:31
3. "Fabulous Friend" – 2:52
4. "The Last Letter" – 2:43
