= The Shrinking Violets =

Australian band

The Shrinking Violet were an Australian band from Sydney active from 1987 to 1990. They recorded with Phantom Records.

== Members ==
- Marcus Clement: Vocals, Guitar
- Julian Knowles: Guitars, Vocals, Keyboards (see Even As We Speak, Big Heavy Stuff)
- Barry 'Fuzz' Hayes: Bass, Vocals
- Andrew Clement: Drums

== Discography ==
- 7" Vinyl Single (Purple Vinyl): "Everything" b/w "She Said" - Phantom Records 1988. Its highest chart position was number 3, On the Street Independent Charts, Australia, 1988
- 12" Vinyl Album (Yellow Vinyl): Mask - Phantom Records1989. Its highest chart position was number 6, On the Street Independent Charts, Australia, 1989
- 12" Vinyl Compilation Assorted Desecrations and Mutations Phantom Records included tracks "Love to Rule" (cover of The Sunnyboys first EP track), "Take Me Away' (Cover of The Kelpies)
- "Never Too Late" - track included on compilation Young Blood II - RooArt Records 1990
