= Skywriting (album) =

Studio album by The Field Mice
- Released: June 1990
- Genre: Indie pop, twee pop
- Length: 34:28
- Label: Sarah Records

The Field Mice chronology
Snowball (1989)	Skywriting (1990)	Coastal (1991)

2005 Reissue cover

Professional ratings
Review scores
Source	Rating
AllMusic	3/5 stars
Pitchfork Media	6.6/10

Skywriting is the second album by the Field Mice.

It is often regarded as the most experimental of their three albums: featuring six wildly eclectic tracks ranging from post-acid house electronica (the side-long opener "Triangle"), country and western (side two's opener "Canada"), Go-Betweens-influenced jangle pop ("Clearer") and New Order-type sequencer/guitars ("It Isn't Forever"), to wistful, atmospheric, slow-motion ambience ("Below The Stars") and bizarre sample-strewn noise-collages (final track "Humblebee").

== Track listing ==
1. "Triangle" – 8:55
2. "Canada" – 3:28
3. "Clearer" – 3:56
4. "It Isn't Forever" – 6:01
5. "Below the Stars" – 5:36
6. "Humblebee" – 6:32

=== 2005 bonus tracks ===
The following tracks appear on the 2005 reissue of the album from LTM recordings.

7. "Landmark"
8. "Quicksilver"
9. "Holland Street"
10. "Indian Ocean"
11. "So Said Kay"

Disc Two

1. "If You Need Someone"
2. "The World to Me"
3. "Song Six"
4. "Anyone Else Isn't You"
5. "Bleak"
6. "I Thought Wrong"
7. "Right as Rain"
8. "A Heart Disease Called Love"
9. "This Is Not Here (1998)"
10. "Other Galaxies"

"This Is Not Here (1998)" is the remixed version first issued on Where'd You Learn to Kiss That Way?. The original version appears on For Keeps. "A Heart Disease Called Love" is a cover of a John Cooper Clarke song.
