= Sensitive (song) =

Single by The Field Mice
- Released: 27 February 1989
- Genre: Indie pop, Twee pop
- Label: Sarah Records

The Field Mice singles chronology
"Emma's House" (1988)	"Sensitive" (1989)	"I Can See Myself Alone Forever" (1989)

"Sensitive" is the second single by The Field Mice. It was released as a 7" vinyl record on Sarah Records in February 1989, and included a fold-out poster depicting a leaf. Sensitive, on which the band's sound verged on shoegazing, has been described as "an anthemic statement of purpose...a defence of feeling...and a comment on the way sensitivity is criticized, or punished even". The single reached number 12 in the UK Independent Chart in March that year. "Sensitive" was also voted at number 26 in the 1989 Festive 50. Both tracks from the single were later included on the CD reissue of the band's debut mini-album Snowball.

== Track listing ==
7" Single (SARAH 018)

1. "Sensitive" - 5:03
2. "When Morning Comes to Town" - 5:14
