= Fat Tulips =

Indie pop band from Nottingham, England (1987–1994)

- Origin: Nottingham, England
- Genres: Indie pop, indie rock
- Years active: 1987–1994
- Labels: Heaven; Vinyl Japan
- Past members: Mark D Matt Johnson; Sheggi C. Paul Huckerby; Sarah C Katie Keen

Fat Tulips were an indie pop band from England, who released one album, on the Vinyl Japan label, and over 10 singles on the band's own Heaven Records and others.

== History ==
The Fat Tulips were formed in the late 1980s in Peterborough by Mark D. Their first release was a flexi disc called You Opened Up My Eyes and featured Sarah C. on vocals. Sarah quickly left the band.

Mark then recruited new members consisting of Katie Keen on vocals, Paul Huckerby on bass, Shelagh Clarkson on guitar and Matthew Johnson on drums.

Soon after the release of their single "Where's Clare Grogan Now" (played by John Peel), Katie left the band and Sheggi became the new singer.

Subsequent releases, including the EP Four Songs for Simon, Ferensway and The Tulip Explodes, led to a recording contract with the London based Vinyl Japan label, home and future home of BMX Bandits, the McCluskey Bros, and Thee Headcoats.

The first of their Vinyl Japan output was an EP entitled Nostalgia and was recorded by Ken McPherson at his studio in Burton upon Trent. A tour of Germany supporting Throw That Beat in the Garbagecan soon followed. The band's debut album, Starfish, also recorded by Ken McPherson, came out in 1994 and was followed by two more singles, "New Spring Rites for Sarah" and "Driving Me Wild" before the band called it a day.

== Heaven Records ==
The Heaven Records record label was started by the Fat Tulips in 1989 to release their own debut 7-inch single "Where's Clare Grogan Now?", the band's homage to the singer in Altered Images.

The label is co-owned by guitarist / songwriter Mark D of the Fat Tulips, Confetti and Fat Tulips drummer Matthew Johnson. Heaven is based in Burton Joyce, Nottingham. The label went on to release 7-inch singles by other bands including The Melons, Vicarage Garden, Confetti, Strawberry Story, Throw That Beat in the Garbage Can, The Golden Dawn, Velocity Girl, Unisex, The Rosehips, and Girl of the World.

== Discography ==
=== Albums and EPs ===
- Early Years EP (1987) 7-inch EP
- Four Songs for Simon (1990) 7-inch EP
- Ferensway (1991) 7-inch EP
- The Tulip Explodes (1991) 7-inch EP
- Take Me Back to Heaven (1991) 7-inch EP
- Nostalgia (1992) 7-inch EP
- Albie (1992) 7-inch
- Driving Me Wild (1994) 7-inch/CD
- Starfish LP/CD

=== Singles ===
- "Sweet William" (1989) split flexi w/ The Rosehips
- "Where's Clare Grogan Now" (1989) 7-inch single
- "4 Bands 4 Songs" (1990) split flexi w/ The Applicants, The Haywains, Paintbox
- "The Way Things Are" (1991) flexi
- "Heaven" (1992) split flexi w/ Confetti
- "New Spring Rites for Sarah" (1994) 7-inch single

=== Compilation appearances ===
- El Dorado (1990) Various artists
- The Waaaaah! CD (1991) Various artists

== See also ==
- Mark D
- Confetti
