= What Do I Wish for Now? (Singles + Extras 1994–2004) =

Compilation album of singles by Aberdeen
- Released: 2006
- Recorded: 1994–2006
- Genre: Twee pop
- Length: 68:02
- Label: LTM Recordings

Professional ratings
Review scores
Source	Rating
AllMusic	link
Pitchfork Media	7.7/10.0 link

What Do I Wish for Now? (Singles + Extras 1994–2004) is a compilation album by Aberdeen released in 2006, a year after the band's breakup.

The album features all of Aberdeen's singles, B-sides and songs that previously only appeared on various artists albums, presented in chronological order. For this release, the first three tracks (which were originally released together) were remastered. The accompanying booklet contains a history of the band (originally published on the Under the Radar website in 2002) and retrospective quotations from the band.

== Track listing ==
1. 'Byron' (3:42)
2. 'Toy Tambourine' (3:22)
3. 'Fran' (2:55)
4. 'Fireworks' (3:14)
5. 'When It Doesn't Matter' (3:59)
6. 'Super Sunny Summer' (3:06)
7. 'Snapdragon' (3:45)
8. 'I Think I'm Falling' (3:42)
9. 'Marine Parade' (2:07)
10. 'She Never Understood' (5:30)
11. 'Sink or Float' (3:27)
12. 'Drive' (4:16)
13. 'The Boy Has Gone Away' (3:29)
14. 'Miss You Now You're Gone' (3:38)
15. 'Emma's House' (3:55)
16. 'Florida' (4:50)
17. 'Late Bloomr' (4:16)
18. 'Kyoto Death Song' (4:41)
