= Sensitization (disambiguation) =

Sensitization is an example of non-associative learning.

Sensitization may also refer to:

- Sensitization (immunology), a concept in immunology
- Sensitization effect, the creation of galvanic corrosion cells within the microstructure of an alloy
- Drug sensitization, also called Reverse tolerance
- "Sensitized", a song by Kylie Minogue from X

== See also ==
- Sensitivity (disambiguation)
- Sensitizer (disambiguation)
