= Secret Shine =

British indie band

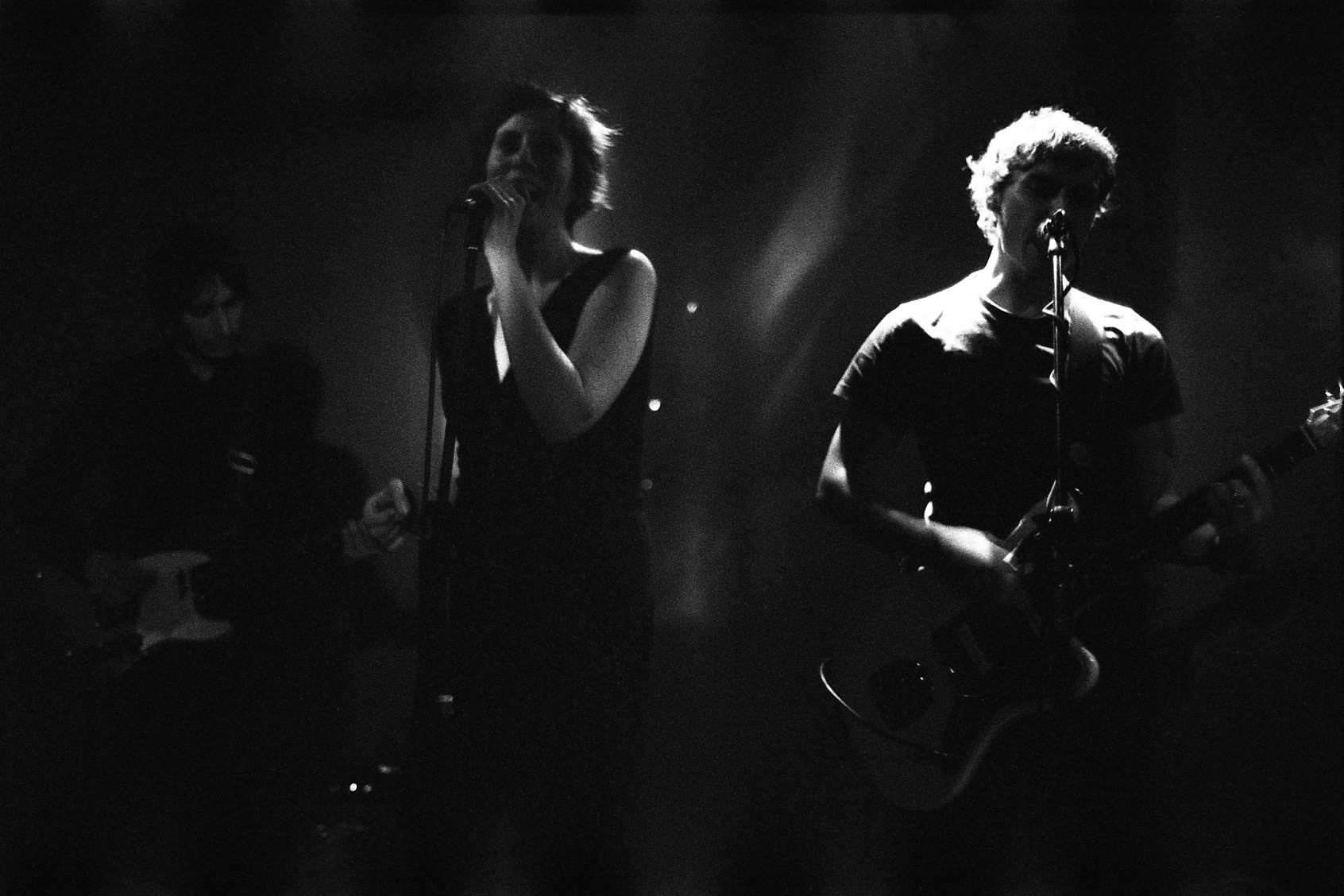
- Secret Shine in Berlin in 2009

Background information
- Also known as: Amelia's Dream
- Origin: Bristol
- Genres: Indie rock; shoegazing; dream pop
- Years active: 1991–1996; 2004–present
- Labels: Sarah; A Turntable Friend; Clairecords; Razorblade
- Members: Scott Purnell; Jamie Gingell; Kathryn Smith; Dean Purnell; Tom Adams
- Past members: Nick Dyte; Paul Vowles; Dean Tyler; Tim Morris; Richy Lee

Secret Shine are a British indie band formed in the early 1990s, who were signed to Sarah Records. Their early releases with Sarah and A Turntable Friend followed a pop style, before the band went in a more shoegaze direction with the 1992 release Untouched, triggering comparisons with Slowdive and My Bloody Valentine.

== Career ==
=== 1990–1996 ===
The group originally formed under the name Amelia's Dream. After sending a three-song demo to Sarah Records, Scott Purnell and Jamie Gingell recorded their first single for the label, "After Years". After recruiting three more members (Nick Dyte, Dean Purnell, and Paul Vowles) they recorded "Unbearable", a single for the German label A Turntable Friend. The addition of Dean Tyler to the lineup was followed by the single "Ephemeral" on Sarah. Later, Purnell and Gingell recorded some demos that became the Untouched album.

In 1993 the album was recorded and released, along with the single "Loveblind". The addition of vocalist Kathryn Smith saw the band enter the Indie charts and become part of the emerging shoegaze scene. At that point, the band took a hiatus as Purnell and Gingell returned to complete their final year of university, but the band subsequently reformed and recorded the Greater than God EP.

After the recording of the Each to the Other flexidisc, Dean Tyler left the band, followed by Nick Dyte. Tim Morris joined on drums, the rest of the lineup being Jamie Gingell (vocals and bass), Scott Purnell (guitars), Dean Purnell (guitars), and Kathryn Smith (vocals). The next single, "Wasted Away", was released on Spoiler Records as Sarah had recently folded. After playing a gig in Oxford in early 1996, the band decided to stop, though they never officially split.

=== 2004–present ===
In 2004, a retrospective collection called After Years was released by the Tonevendor label, containing all their Sarah material (apart from the first single, and including the Untouched album), which became a catalyst for the band reforming. Around this time, Tim Morris died, and the band reformed to record an acoustic eight-track tribute record, Morris.

Another album, All of The Stars, was released on 8 April 2008, followed by The Beginning and the End on 5 January 2011.

In October 2014 Secret Shine signed with shoegaze and dream pop record label Saint Marie Records. The next full-length album, There Is Only Now, was released on 17 March 2017.

On 25 June 2020, the band self-released a new single "Ember". In an interview around that time the band said that this was intended to be the first of five single releases during 2020-2021 that would form the basis of a new album in 2021, to mark the band's 30th anniversary. Another single, "Empyrean", was released on 26 September 2021.

== Discography ==
=== Albums ===
Title	Label and cat#	Date	Format(s)
Untouched	Sarah 615	March 1993	LP, CD
After Years	Tonevendor	February 2004	CD
Morris – Acoustic Tribute Album	None	May 2005	CD
All of the Stars	Clairecords FERN074	April 2008	CD
The Beginning and the End	Secret Shine shine01 (Self-Released)	January 2011	CD
There Is Only Now	Saint Marie Records	March 2017	LP, CD

=== EPs ===
Title	Label and cat#	Date	Format(s)
After Years	Sarah 53	September 1991	7"
Greater than God	Sarah 89	May 1994	10" & CD
Elemental	Razorblade RZ01	February 2006	CD
Beyond Sea and Sky	Razorblade RZ03	October 2006	CD

=== Singles ===
Title	Label and cat#	Date	Format(s)
"Unbearable" "My Only Friend"	A Turntable Friend 007	September 1991	7"
"Ephemeral" – "Honey Sweet" "Secret Shine"	Sarah 61	April 1992	7"
"Loveblind" "Way Too High" "Honey Sweet" (CD only)	Sarah 71	April 1993	7" & CD
"Wasted Away" "Wish Coming True"	Spoiler SSS001	February 1995	7"
"Each Time" "Anything About Me"	self-released	July 2014	7"
"Ember"	self-released	June 2020	Digital download and streaming
"Empyrean"	self-released	September 2021	Digital download and streaming

=== Tracks on compilations ===
Album title	Label and cat#	Track(s)
There and Back Again Lane	Sarah 100	"Temporal"
Battery Point	Sarah 359	"Deep Thinker"
Gaol Ferry Bridge	Sarah 530	"Loveblind"
Fountain Island	Sarah 583	"Grey Skies"
Engine Common	Sarah 628	"Honey Sweet"
In This Place Called Nowhere	Quattro 2011, Sarah Japan	"After Years"
La rue du chat qui peche	Quattro 2024, Sarah Japan	"Loveblind" "Temporal"
Birth of the True	Sugarfrost Frosty2	"Take me Slowly"
Test Tones Vol. 1.1	Clairecords FERN 035	"Way Too High"
Dear Future	King Records KICM 3239	"Dear Future"
