= The Golden Dawn (Scottish band) =

- Origin: Glasgow, Scotland
- Genres: Indie pop, Indie rock
- Years active: 1986-199?
- Labels: Sarah, Heaven, Spirophone
- Members: Robert Smith (vocals, guitar); Ulric Kennedy (vocals, bass); Kenny Forte (guitar); Eugene Dawydiak (keyboards); Peter Claughan (drums)
- Past members: Pers (drums); Sharon Scott (drums)

The Golden Dawn were an indie pop/indie rock band from Glasgow, Scotland formed in 1986, who were signed to Sarah Records on the strength of a 9-track demo. They had two hits on the UK Indie Chart in 1988 and 1989, with what have been described as "awesomely ragged, feedback-riddled singles". The band were dropped by Sarah Records, when the tracks the band put forward for a third single, "No Reason Why" and "Luminous", for the label were rejected. These songs would eventually be released in 2000 on Heaven.

Band members Robert Smith and Kenny Forte went on to form Christine's Cat (who released a 5" flexi-disc, "Your Love Is", on Sarah Records), while Smith later resurfaced as The Besotted (who released a single, "Kaleidoscope" on the Blam-A-Bit label) and as a member of Meth O.D.who released several singles and albums throughout the 1990s.
Ulric Kennedy revived his pre-Golden Dawn band The Catalysts following the release of their early demos as "The Catalysts EP" by Felicite Singles Club in 2002, belatedly following it up with the "Long Distance EP" (Spirophone, 2006). Kennedy has also worked as a producer, most notably on releases by Roy Moller (Book Club Records) and The Happy Couple (Matinee/Felicite).

== Live performances ==
With the exception of their last performance, The Golden Dawn gave all their concerts a title that would be used in promotional posters and flyers.

=== "Death Of The Love Generation", Fury Murry's, 21 June 1987, Glasgow ===
Setlist: "Spring-Heeled Jack", "The Sun Never Shines For Me", "I Love You More Than Marilyn Monroe", "Chase My Blues Away", "George Hamilton's Dead", "The Sweetest Touch", "Song For Jane", "Fire".

=== "Playing Soft Tonight", Texas Fever, 27 November 1987, Glasgow ===
Setlist: "The Railway Track", "Our Children", "Chase My Blues Away", "Siren Song", "George Hamilton's Dead", "The Sweetest Touch", "I Love You More Than Marilyn Monroe", "My Secret World", "Pretty Poison", "Fire", "Spring-Heeled Jack", "Black".

=== "So Cool, So Right", Rooftops, 8 July 1988, Glasgow ===
Setlist: "The Railway Track", "Black", "Surf Song", "George Hamilton's Dead", "The Sweetest Touch", "The Sun Never Shines For Me", "No reason Why", "Siren Song", "Let's Build A Dyson Sphere", "My Secret World", "My Secret World", "Our Children", "Fire".

=== "Musick In Theory And Practice", Hollywood Studios, 9 October 1988, Glasgow ===
Setlist: "The Railway Track", "Our Children", "Surf Song", "Black", "Let's Build A Dyson Sphere", "No Reason Why", "George Hamilton's Dead", "Siren Song", "Fire".

=== Maryhill Community Centre, 13 May 1989, Glasgow ===
Setlist: "The Railway Track", "Surf Song", "Black", "George Hamilton's Dead", "Let's Build A Dyson Sphere", "Our Children", "Spring-Heeled Jack", "No Reason Why", "Fire".

== Discography ==
Chart placings shown are from the UK Indie Chart.

=== Demos ===
First Demo (1986): "Is This What We Call Love?", "Thousand Years", "Stranded"

Second Demo (1987): "Spring-Heeled Jack", "Sun Never Shines For Me", "Chase My Blues Away", "I Love You More Than Marilyn Monroe", "Shining Stars", "My Secret World", "George Hamilton's Dead", "The Sweetest Touch", "Fire"

=== Singles ===
- "My Secret World" (1988), B-Sdies: "Spring-Heeled Jack", "The Railway Track", Sarah Records Catalogue Number 009 (#14)
- "George Hamilton's Dead" (1989), B-Sides: "The Sweetest Touch", "Let's Build A Dyson Sphere", Sarah Records Catalogue Number 017 (#19)
- "No Reason Why" (2000), B-side "Luminous" Heaven Records

=== Compilation appearances ===
- Airspace! (1989) Breaking Down ("George Hamilton's Dead")
- The Velvet Dawn Flexi (1989) Raving Pop Blast! ("The Sun Never Shines")
- Shadow Factory (1989) Sarah ("My Secret World")
- Air Balloon Road (1989) Sarah ("My Secret World", "George Hamilton's Dead")
- Airpsace II (1990) Breaking Down ("No Reason Why")
- Temple Cloud (1990) Sarah ("George Hamilton's Dead")
- And They Call It Pop (19??) Fragrant ("Luminous")
- Everlasting Happiness (19??) ("Chase My Blues Away", "Fire")
