= Homesick and Happy to Be Here =

Studio album by Aberdeen
- Released: 2002
- Recorded: 2001
- Genre: Twee pop
- Length: 44:43
- Label: Better Looking
- Producer: Aberdeen with David Newton

Professional ratings
Review scores
Source	Rating
AllMusic	4/5 stars
Pitchfork Media	7.0/10

Homesick and Happy to Be Here is an album by the Los Angeles pop band Aberdeen, released in 2002.

== Critical reception ==
CMJ New Music Report deemed Homesick and Happy to Be Here "a gentle collection of guitar pop with elegant vocals." The Los Angeles Times wrote that "the album is a charming combination of strummy bedroom pop, fuzzy and smoldering guitars, and girl-boy vocals highlighted by [Beth] Arzy's plaintive entreaties."

AllMusic called the album "a roomy, positively beaming sort of record of diamond-sharp mid-tempo indie pop, a uniquely delayed first attempt that runs somewhere between Jeepster earnestness and the flagrant sparkle of the Trash Can Sinatras' Cake."

== Track listing ==
1. 'Handsome Drink' (3:16)
2. 'Sink or Float' (3:27)
3. 'Clouds Like These' (3:51)
4. 'Sunny in California' (3:50)
5. 'Thousand Steps' (5:22)
6. 'Homesick' (5:21)
7. 'Cities & Buses' (4:33)
8. 'Drive' (4:15)
9. 'In My Sleep' (4:50)
10. 'That Cave... That Moon' (5:52)
