= Missing the Moon =

Single by the Field Mice
- Released: August 1991
- Genre: Indie pop; twee pop
- Label: Sarah
- Producer: Ian Catt

The Field Mice singles chronology
"September's Not So Far Away" (1991)	"Missing the Moon" (1991)	"Burning World" (1991)

"Missing the Moon" is a single by the Field Mice. It was released as a 12" vinyl record. It was the group's final proper single release (a live cover of Loop's "Burning World" was later issued as a flexidisc) and marks the culmination of their experiments with electronica, being a heavily synthesised dance pop single. Annemari Davies sings the verses, Bobby Wratten the choruses (with backing vocals by Davies).

"Missing the Moon" was the first 12" single released on Sarah Records. Interviewed in Melody Maker in 1996 to mark the closure of the label, founder Matt Haynes chose "Missing the Moon" as his favourite Sarah Records release, though he also claimed that many fans of the label "hated" it due to its dance crossover style and use of the 12" format.

== Reception ==
The song was the Single of the Week in New Musical Express with an enthusiastic review by Ian McCann.

The single was voted number 45 in John Peel's Festive Fifty for 1991, and 35 in Tom Ewing's top 100 Singles Of The 90s.

== Track listing ==
12" single (SARAH 057)

1. "Missing the Moon" – 7:02
2. "A Wrong Turn and Raindrops" – 4:21
3. "An Earlier Autumn" – 2:02
