= Mark D =

British artist and musician

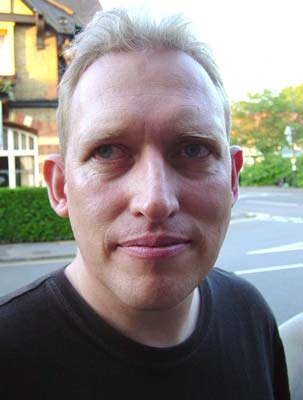
- Born: Mark Randall
- Known for: Painting
- Movement: Stuckism

Mark D, born Mark Randall, is a British punk musician (guitarist and songwriter). He is also associated with the Stuckist group of artists. Mark D was born and spent his childhood in Peterborough. He now lives in Nottingham.

== Music ==
From university onwards, Mark D (D standing for "degenerate") played in various bands including the Fat Tulips, Confetti (when he was known as David), the Pleasure Heads (when he was known as Mark Randyhead), Oscar, Servalan and Sundress, and appeared on dozens of releases. He published and edited fanzines, including the underground C86 fanzine Two Pint Take Home. He is a co-owner of Heaven Records.

The Fat Tulips were formed in 1987 and have been described as "incredibly skilled in the art of buzzing electric guitars, ferocious tempos, pristine pop melodies and lyrics that weren't nearly as sweet as they sounded at first listen." The Fat Tulips broke up in the mid-1990s.

== Painting ==
An interest in the music of Billy Childish led onto Childish's paintings, which he acquired, and subsequently also the work of other artists in the Stuckist group. He contacted two artists who had been exhibited by the Stuckists, Stella Vine and Gina Bold, both of whom refused to sell him work, because of his connection with Childish. Vine responded with an email, which said, "Go fuck yourself." He was encouraged and given advice by Stuckist co-founder, Charles Thomson, without whom Mark D said, "I could easily have given up on doing my own work."

His paintings make visual and verbal comments on well-known figures in the art world, starting with Billy Childish, Tracey Emin, Stella Vine and Damien Hirst. He describes Emin as "without doubt a very talented artist whose work I greatly admire."

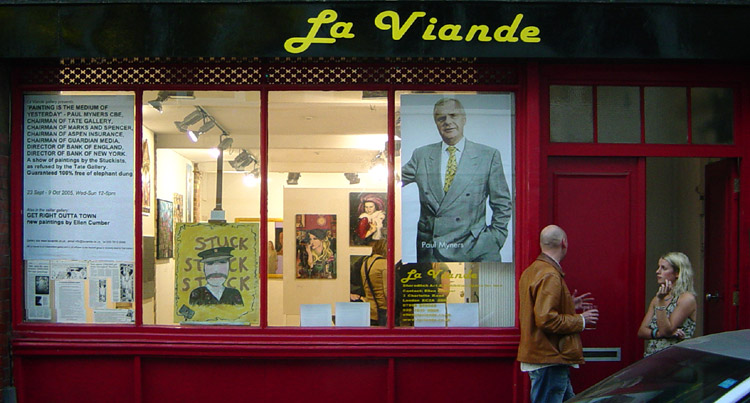
Mark D's painting in the window of the Stuckist show, "Painting is the Medium of Yesterday", 2005.

Mark D first exhibited in September 2005 with the Stuckists at La Viande gallery, Shoreditch, in a show ''Painting Is the Medium of Yesterday"—Paul Myners CBE, Chairman of Tate Gallery, Chairman of Marks and Spencer, Chairman of Aspen Insurance, Chairman of Guardian Media, Director of Bank of England, Director of Bank of New York. A Show of Paintings by the Stuckists, as Refused by the Tate Gallery. Guaranteed 100% Free of Elephant Dung.

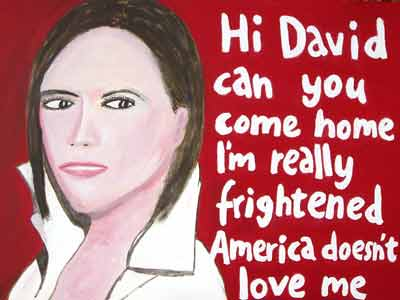
Mark D. Victoria Beckham: America Doesn't Love Me.

His solo show, Mark D and the Stuckists v Tracey Emin and Damien Hirst, was at the Art Organisation gallery in March 2007. It included a display of material about Stuckist demonstrations. As well as his own paintings he showed paintings by other Stuckist artists from his collection, which he jointly owns with his wife, Tully, and states is "the world's largest collection of Stuckist paintings".

In February 2008, he staged a show of his paintings, which satirise Stella Vine's images of Princess Diana and Kate Moss, replacing the former with Victoria Beckham and showing Moss eating slugs. The exhibition, held jointly with Abby Jackson at La Viande gallery in Shoreditch, London, was called Disney Heroines Committing Suicide.

Some outstanding musicians have proved that all you need are 3 chords and a cheap guitar to come up with a classic. I find it much more interesting to listen to some low budget production record full of life and energy with lots of good ideas, (e.g. early Clash and Velvet Underground, The Vaselines, The White Stripes and, of course, Billy Childish with the Buff Medways etc.) than some over-produced bland pomp like Athlete, Coldplay or U2.

Charles Thomson described his work as "brilliant punk paintings".

== Gallery ==
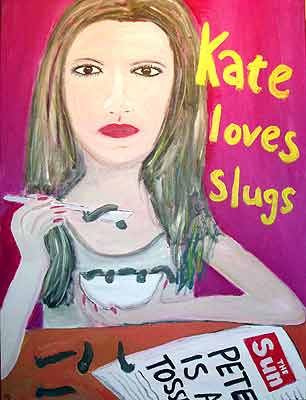
Mark D. Kate Moss: Kate Loves Slugs.

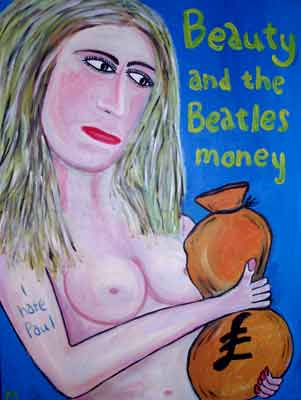
Heather Mills: Beauty and the Beatles Money

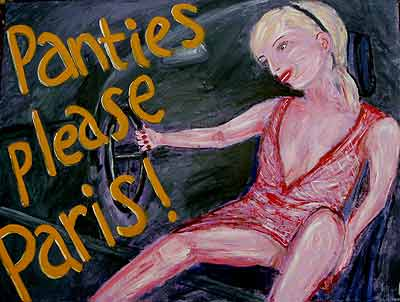
Paris Hilton: Panties Please Paris

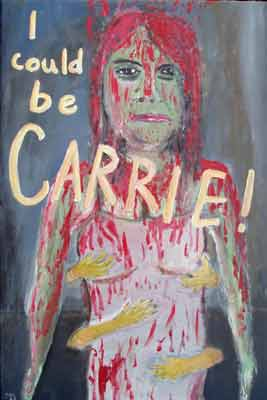
Tracey Emin:I Could Be Carrie

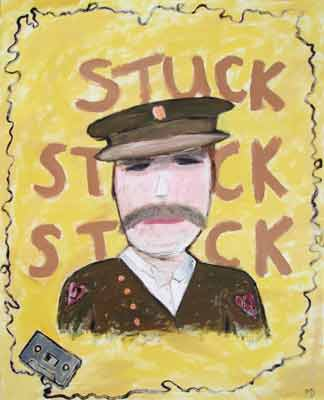
Billy Childish: Truth Lies and Audiotape

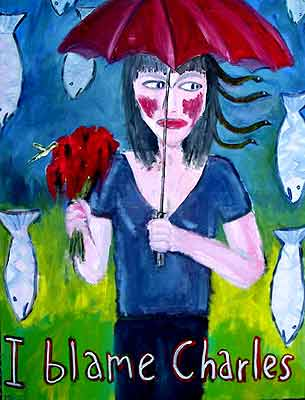
Gina Bold: I Blame Charles

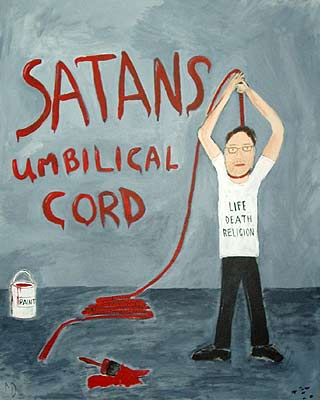
Damien Hirst: Money for Old Rope

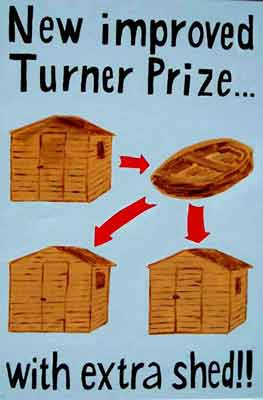
Shed Boat Shed Shed

== See also ==
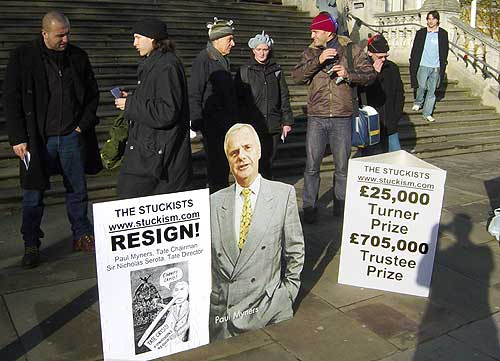
Mark D's painting on a placard during a Stuckists demonstration at Tate Britain, 6 December 2005.

- Stuckism
- The Upper Room (paintings)
- Fat Tulips
