= The Melons =

- Origin: Nottingham, England
- Genres: Indie pop
- Years active: 1993–1997
- Labels: Heaven Records; Sunday Records; Damaged Goods; Pickled Egg Records; Elefant Records; Sorted Records

The Melons were an indie pop band formed in Nottingham, England in 1993, by Helen Melon (vocals) and Shelly Melon (songs, instruments), aka: Vanessa and Sheggi, Nottingham music scene veterans.

For their first live appearance they were joined by guitarist Noel Melon and bassist Tim Melon, but for all subsequent appearances they were joined by Colin Altuccini (guitar) and Nigel Turner (bass). Drums were provided by a drum machine until late 1995, when drummer Rob Scott joined and took over those duties. For a number of live appearances they were joined by Roger Melon on mandolin.

Katy and Vanessa appeared on all the recordings by The Melons. Altuccini and Turner appeared on all recordings after "Strictly Melonhead" and Rob Melon appeared on the "Fast Lane" single.

The track "Fire Engine Girl", from the "Show Me Wishes More Than These EP" flexidisc, was played by Mark Radcliffe on his evening show on BBC Radio 1. This led to The Melons playing two live sessions on his show, on 18 May 1995 and 6 March 1996.

The Melons appeared live on stage only fifteen times, but managed to play with Heavenly, Prolapse, Bis, Modesty Blaise, The Television Personalities, Helen Love and Super Furry Animals.

Altuccini and Helen Melon appeared as Mr and Mrs Cantaloup, and Turner as Mr Honeydew, in a number of episodes of Chez Lester, a soap opera on Leicester's Cable 7 community TV channel. In episode 63, they performed The Melons track, "Little Death Wishes".

== Discography ==
=== Singles / EPs ===
- "Show Me Wishes More Than These EP" (7" flexi, 1993, Heaven Records, HV07)
- "Strictly Melonhead" (7”, 1994, Sunday Records, Sunday 034)
- "From Hell to Helsinki" (7”, 1995, Damaged Goods, Damgood 79)
- "Fast Lane" (7”, 1996, Damaged Goods, Damgood 91)
- "Black and Blue" / "Eskimo" (7”, 1997, Pickled Egg Records, Egg1)

=== Tracks on compilation albums ===
- "Eskimo" on Casablanca (1997, Elefant Records, ER-1056)
- "Big Freeze" on Suction Prints (1998, Sorted Records, SRLP4)
