= Epicurean (album) =

Epicurean - A Soundtrack

Compilation album by The Orchids
- Released: August 1992
- Recorded: Glasgow, 1989-1991
- Genre: Indie pop, twee pop, dream pop, jangle pop, chamber pop
- Label: Sarah Records
- Producer: Ian Carmichael, and The Orchids

Professional ratings
Review scores
Source	Rating
Allmusic	link
NME	(7/10) link

Epicurean was a compilation of early work by The Orchids, released by Sarah Records in 1992.

== Track listing ==
1. "Peaches"
2. "A place called Home"
3. "Tiny Words"
4. "Moon Lullaby"
5. "Walter"
6. "It's Only Obvious"
7. "Long Drawn Sunday Night"
8. "Blue Light"
9. "Yawn"
10. "Sigh"
11. "Something For The Longing"
12. "The York Song"
13. "Bemused, Confused and Bedraggled"
14. "Caveman"
15. "Underneath The Window, Underneath The Sink"
16. "Pelican Blonde"
17. "Women Priests And Addicts"
18. "Carrole-Anne"
19. "Tropical Fishbowl"
20. "The Sadness Of Sex (Part 1)"
