= Good to Be a Stranger =

Good to be a Stranger

Studio album by The Orchids
- Released: March 2007
- Recorded: Glasgow, August–December 2006
- Genre: Indie pop, jangle pop, twee pop
- Label: Siesta Records
- Producer: The Orchids

Professional ratings
Review scores
Source	Rating
AllMusic	link

Good to be a Stranger is an album by The Orchids, released in 2007. It was recorded by the group when they reunited in 2006 with new members Ronnie Borland and Keith Sharp.

"Good to Be a Stranger is buttoned-down guitar pop at its most shuffling, but when you consider where these lads have been (and just as important, where they're from), it takes this release beyond your standard reunion fare. However, their fans will notice that creative dotage and standard rust hasn't eroded the Orchids' ability to craft toothsome pop delightfully belying their gritty background. "The Last Thing (On Your Mind)" tingles with its bits of flute, while the opening horns on "I Need You to Believe in Me" and the silvery strings on the choruses of "Do It for Yourself" add requisite passion. "Xylophone Song" and "You Could Do Something to Me" feature softhearted, circular melodies reminiscent of anything the band ever released on Sarah."

This was the group's fourth album. Remixes of "Another Saturday Night" and "I Need You to Believe in Me" by Ian Carmichael, who produced the earlier albums, were released later.

== Track listing ==
1. "Good to Be a Stranger"
2. "Take My Hand"
3. "Xylophone Song"
4. "I Need You to Believe in Me"
5. "The Last Thing (on your mind)"
6. "Another Saturday Night"
7. "Down to the Ocean"
8. "Feel the Magic"
9. "Do It for Yourself"
10. "You Could Do Something to Me"
