= Blueboy (band) =

English indie pop band

- Origin: Reading, Berkshire, England
- Genre: Indie pop
- Years active: 1989–1999, 2023–
- Labels: Sarah Records; Shinkansen Recordings; Prenew
- Members: Paul Stewart; Gemma Townley; Mark Cousens; Martin Rose
- Past members: Keith Girdler (deceased); Harvey Williams; Lloyd Haggar; Cath Close; James Neville; Ian Gardner

Blueboy are an indie pop band formed in Reading, Berkshire who were signed to Sarah Records and later Shinkansen Recordings. Core members Keith Girdler and Paul Stewart also recorded as Arabesque and Beaumont. After breaking up in 1998 and Girdler's passing in 2007, Stewart resumed the band in 2023 with several of its previous members.

== History ==
Blueboy formed around 1989 and initially consisted of Keith Girdler (on vocals) and Paul Stewart (on guitars), formerly of little-known band Feverfew. They soon signed to Sarah Records, releasing the home-recorded single "Clearer" in 1991, and took on more members, including singer/cellist Gemma Townley and second guitarist Harvey Williams (of The Field Mice/Another Sunny Day). "Clearer" was followed by several singles and two albums on Sarah, If Wishes Were Horses and Unisex. In October 1994, Blueboy recorded a session for John Peel's BBC Radio 1 show. Their final release before going on hiatus, The Bank of England, was released in 1998 on Sarah head Matt Haynes' new label, Shinkansen Recordings. By then, Girdler and Stewart were the only original members of the band. Girdler and Stewart were also involved in two other bands, Arabesque and Beaumont, and Girdler also recorded with Lovejoy. Townley later joined Trembling Blue Stars, as did Williams.

Keith Girdler was diagnosed with cancer in 2004 and he died on 15 May 2007. Prior to his death he was working as volunteer manager for Age Concern in Eastbourne.

In 2008, Siesta Records issued a compilation album called Country Music (Songs for Keith Girdler). The compilation was put together by Richard Preece (of Lovejoy) to raise money for the Martletts Hospice in Hove who cared for Girdler.

In 2018, Blueboy's music was released to Bandcamp as part of the release of all the Sarah Records back-catalogue.

In April 2020, during the COVID-19 pandemic, Paul Stewart recorded acoustic versions of some Blueboy songs and posted them to the "OfficialBlueboy" Youtube channel to connect with those interested in the band.

October 2023 saw a reunion described as "almost accidental" when Townley (now going by Gemma Malley) and Stewart played at the launch of These Things Happen: The Sarah Records Story. This was followed by a new single in May 2024, "One", which was recorded as a four-piece with Stewart and Townley rejoined by Mark Cousens on bass and Martin Rose on drums. To mark the release of "One" and celebrate the 30th anniversary of Unisex, Blueboy performed a full-band show on the 18th of May at the Water Rats in London. Another new single, "Deux", followed on the 2nd of November.

== Discography ==
=== Albums ===
Year	Album	Label
1992	If Wishes Were Horses	Sarah Records
1994	Unisex	Sarah Records
1998	The Bank of England	Shinkansen Recordings

=== Singles ===
- "Clearer" (1991), Sarah
- "Popkiss" (1992), Sarah
- "Cloud Babies" (1993), Sarah - flexi-disc
- "Meet Johnny Rave" (1993), Sarah
- Some Gorgeous Accident EP (1993), Sarah
- "River" (1994), Sarah
- Bikini EP (1995), Aquavinyle
- "Dirty Mags" (1995), Sarah
- "Love Yourself" (1996), Shinkansen
- Marco Polo EP (1998), Shinkansen
- One (2024), Prenew

=== Compilations ===
- Speedboat (1993 - Quattro Records)

=== Discography as Arabesque ===
- Roma EP EP (1995), Siesta
- The Grooming Gambit EP (1997), Siesta

=== Discography as Beaumont ===
- This Is... (2000), Siesta
- Discotheque a la Carte (2001), Siesta
- Tiara (2003), Siesta
- No Time Like The Past (2005), Siesta

== Compilation album appearances ==
- Grimsby Fishmarket 4 Norrkoeping 0, featured "Chelsea Guitar"
- In This Place Called Nowhere (1992) Quattro, featured "Clearer"
- Sound of Music - An Anti-Racist Benefit (1993) Bring on Bull, featured "My Favourite Things"
- La Rue du Chat Qui Pêche (1993) Sarah/Quattro, featured "Elle" and "Air France"
- Gaol Ferry Bridge (1994) Sarah, featured "Try Happiness" and "Air France"
- Engine Common (1995) Sarah, featured "Clearer" and "Popkiss"
- Battery Point (1995) Sarah, featured "Dirty Mags", "River", and "Toulouse"
- There and Back Again Lane (1995) Sarah, featured "The Joy of Living"
- PREGO! The Menu of Trattoria (1995) Trattoria, featured "My Favourite Things"
- Country Music: Songs for Keith Girdler (2008) Siesta, featured "80's Diaries"
