= For Keeps (album) =

Studio album by The Field Mice
- Released: October 1991
- Genres: Indie pop; twee pop; shoegaze; dream pop
- Length: 51:23
- Label: Sarah Records
- Producers: Ian Catt; The Field Mice

The Field Mice chronology
Coastal (1991)	For Keeps (1991)	Where'd You Learn to Kiss That Way? (1998)

2005 Reissue cover

Professional ratings
Review scores
Source	Rating
AllMusic	4/5 stars
Pitchfork Media	7.9/10
Stylus Magazine	(B)

For Keeps is the third and final album by The Field Mice. It was also their very first (and only) full-length release on Sarah Records - their previous two, Skywriting and Snowball, being mini-albums. "For Keeps" adheres to the Field Mice blueprint of ambient electronica combined with wistful acoustic/jangle pop with Bobby Wratten's lovelorn lyrical obsessions, best represented on the alternately reflective and soaring highlight that is "Star of David".

Despite the middle section of side two being taken up with three successive slow-paced and pastoral-sounding ballads, the album still demonstrates a certain eclecticism that one comes to expect from The Field Mice. Opener "Five Moments", for instance, is a beautifully atmospheric showcase of co-vocalist Anne-Marie Davies' characteristically ethereal vocals. The album's most uptempo [and euphoric] track, "Coach Station Reunion", cheekily steals the guitar riff from The Beatles' "Doctor Robert" via an electric Byrds-ian Rickenbacker guitar, whilst "This Is Not Here" gives the origin of its title away with its blatant Lennon-esque stylings fronted by some psychedelic guitars and phased vocal effects. Two instrumentals bookend the second half: the first, "Tilting at Windmills", shows a more ambient side to the band, whilst the album's rockiest moment; the seven-minute "Freezing Point" which features frazzled Loop-like repetition and caustic guitars at its final coda, brings things to a noisy conclusion.

== Track listing ==
All tracks are written by Anne Mari Davies, Robert Wratten, Michael Hiscock, Harvey Williams and Mark Dobson, except where noted.

No.	Title	Writer(s)	Length
1.	"Five Moments"		5:16
2.	"Star of David"		5:22
3.	"Coach Station Reunion"		3:10
4.	"This Is Not Here"		4:58
5.	"Of the Perfect Kind"		6:11
6.	"Tilting at Windmills"	Davies; Wratten; Hiscock	4:38
7.	"Think of These Things"	Wratten; Hiscock	4:17
8.	"Willow"	Davies; Wratten; Williams	4:20
9.	"And Before the First Kiss"	Davies; Wratten; Williams; Hiscock	5:55
10.	"Freezing Point"		7:19
Total length:			51:23

2005 remastered edition bonus tracks
No.	Title	Writer(s)	Length
11.	"Missing the Moon"		7:02
12.	"A Wrong Turn and Raindrops"	Wratten	4:21
13.	"An Earlier Autumn"		2:02
14.	"September's Not So Far Away"		4:10
15.	"Between Hello and Goodbye"	Davies; Wratten	2:29
Total length:			71:27

== Personnel ==
The Field Mice

- Anne Mari Davies – vocals, guitars, keyboards
- Robert Wratten – vocals, guitars
- Michael Hiscock – bass
- Harvey Williams – guitars, keyboards
- Mark Dobson – drums

Additional personnel

- Ian Catt – additional instrumentation, engineering, production
- Julien Potter, Phil Skegg – artwork
