= Aberdeen (band) =

- Origin: Los Angeles, California
- Genres: Twee pop
- Years active: 1993–1995, 2001–2005, 2011
- Labels: Sarah Records (1994-1995); Sunday Records (1995); Tremolo Arm Users Club (2001-2005); LTM
- Past members: John Girgus; Beth Arzy; Jenni Fields; Brian Espinosa; Jonny Joyner; Kelly Davis

Aberdeen was an American twee pop group.

== History ==
The band formed in 1992 and in 1994 released two singles on the seminal British label Sarah Records; they were one of the only American acts on Sarah. Aberdeen also released recordings through Sunday Records and guitarist and co-founder's own label The Tremolo Arm Users Club. They disbanded shortly after Sarah Records folded. They reformed in 2001, signed to Tremolo, and released a full-length album, Homesick and Happy to be Here, two singles, and a maxi-CD (see discography below).

In 2002, the band embarked on a US tour with Robert Wratten, playing solo acoustic performances as Trembling Blue Stars. In 2003, the band again played with Robert but as Trembling Blue Stars for a series of Los Angeles shows at Cafe Club Fais Do-Do.

Possibly the band's biggest exposure came when one of their songs, 'Sink or Float' was featured on Buffy the Vampire Slayer. The song was also included on the UK edition of the series's second soundtrack album, Radio Sunnydale.

Aberdeen broke up again in 2005 as their members drifted to other projects, though they released a career retrospective CD, What Do I Wish for Now? (Singles + Extras 1994–2004), the following year on LTM. Lead singer Beth Arzy has also been a member of Trembling Blue Stars since 2000, and contributed to albums by The Occasional Keepers.

Aberdeen's last performances were at The San Francisco Pop Fest on 05/26/2011 and at The EchoPlex in Los Angeles, opening for 14 Iced Bears and Phil Wilson on 6/5/11. Scheduled performances at Berlin Popfest that same year were ultimately cancelled.

In 2014, John Girgus released a cassette compilation of four-track demos titled It Was the Rain: Lost Recordings 1993-1995 on UsedBinPop Recordings.

== Discography ==
=== Albums ===
- Homesick and Happy to Be Here (Tremolo Arm Users Club, 2002)
- What Do I Wish for Now? (Singles + Extras 1994–2004) (LTM Recordings, 2006)
- It Was the Rain: Lost Recordings 1993-1995) (Used Bin Pop Recordings, 2014)

=== Singles ===
- "Toy Tambourine" (Sarah Records, 1994)
- "Fireworks" (Sarah Records, 1995)
- "Snapdragon" (Sunday Records, 1995)
- "Sink or Float" (Tremolo Arm Users Club, 2002)
- "The Boy Has Gone Away" (Tremolo Arm Users Club, 2003)
- "Florida" (Tremolo Arm Users Club, 2005)
