= Broken by Whispers =

Studio album by Trembling Blue Stars
- Released: 7 March 2000
- Length: 53:36
- Label: Sub Pop

Trembling Blue Stars chronology
Lips That Taste of Tears (1998)	Broken by Whispers (2000)	Alive to Every Smile (2001)

Broken by Whispers is the third studio album by English band Trembling Blue Stars. It was released on 7 March 2000, by Sub Pop.

== Critical reception ==
Professional ratings
Aggregate scores
Source	Rating
Metacritic	78/100
Review scores
Source	Rating
AllMusic	3.5/5 stars
The A.V. Club	4/5 stars
Pitchfork	(6.4/10)
Rolling Stone	3.5/5 stars

Broken by Whispers was met with "universal acclaim" reviews from critics. At Metacritic, which assigns a weighted average rating out of 100 to reviews from mainstream publications, this release received an average score of 78, based on 8 reviews.

== Track listing ==
Broken by Whispers track listing
No.	Title	Length
1.	"Ripples"	5:21
2.	"She Just Couldn't Stay"	4:07
3.	"Sometimes I Still Feel the Bruise"	4:26
4.	"To Leave It Now"	3:57
5.	"Fragile"	5:50
6.	"I No Longer Know Anything"	4:45
7.	"Back to You"	6:40
8.	"Birthday Girl"	4:22
9.	"Snow Showers"	5:50
10.	"Sleep"	4:23
11.	"Dark Eyes"	3:55
Total length:		53:36
