= The Sea Urchins =

Indie pop band from England (1986–1991)

- Origin: West Bromwich, England
- Genres: Indie pop
- Years active: 1986–1991
- Label: Sarah
- Past members: James Roberts; Robert Cooksey; Simon Woodcock; Patrick Roberts; Bridget Duffy; Mark Bevin; Darren Martin

The Sea Urchins were an indie pop band from West Bromwich, England formed in 1986. They were the first band to release a single on Sarah Records.

== History ==
The initial line-up was James Roberts (vocals), Simon Woodcock (guitar), Robert Cooksey (guitar), Mark Bevin (bass), Bridget Duffy (tambourine, organ), and Patrick Roberts (drums). Their first two releases were flexi discs given away with fanzines in 1987. Bevin left, to be replaced by Darren Martin. Their "Pristine Christine" single was the first Sarah Records release, and is highly coveted among vinyl record collectors. With the following year's double-A-side "Solace"/"Please Rain Fall" they began to show more mod-rock influences. Both singles were successful in indie terms, but Sarah Records were unwilling to commit to an album, and Duffy and Martin left. Woodcock took over on bass, with James Roberts adding guitar. The band released one more single for Sarah ("A Morning Oddyssey" in 1990), but disagreements about the next single saw them move on to Cheree Records, who issued "Please Don't Cry" in 1991. The band split up in summer 1991. Two albums were subsequently released; Sarah Records issued a compilation of the band's material for the label, including the flexi-disc tracks, as Stardust in 1992, while Fierce Recordings issued a live album in 1994.

James Roberts, Cooksey, and Woodcock later formed the band Delta. James Roberts, Patrick Roberts, and Robert Cooksey also formed The Low Scene.

== Members ==
- James Roberts (born 4 March 1968) - vocals, acoustic guitar
- Robert Cooksey (born 14 November 1969) - lead guitar
- Simon Woodcock (born 2 December 1969) - rhythm guitar, bass
- Bridget Duffy (born 28 June 1970) - vox organ, tambourine (1986–1989)
- Patrick Roberts - drums
- Mark Bevin (born 21 January 1970) - bass (1986–1987)
- Darren Martin - bass guitar (1987–1989)

== Discography ==
=== Albums ===
- Stardust (1992), Sarah
- Live in London (1994), Fierce

=== Singles ===
- "Pristine Christine" (1987), Sarah (UK Indie No. 11)
- "Please Rain Fall"/"Solace" (1988) Sarah (UK Indie No. 4)
- Recorded 30.10.88 (1988), Fierce
- "A Morning Odyssey" (1990), Sarah
- "Please Don't Cry" (1991), Cheree

=== Compilation appearances ===
- "Cling Film" on The Kvatch flexi (1987), Kvatch
- "Summershine" on Sha-La-La Flexi 5 (1987), Sha La La
- "Pristine Christine" on There And Back Again Lane (1995), Sarah
- "Pristine Christine" on Rough Trade Shops Indiepop 1 (2004), Rough Trade
- "Pristine Christine" on CD86 (2006), Sanctuary
