= Sensitizer =

Sensitizer or sensitiser may refer to:

- Chemical sensitizer, a chemical that causes allergic reaction in normal tissue after exposure
- Explosive sensitizer, a chemical that promotes the rate of propagation of an explosive; see Chemical explosive#Sensitizer
- Photosensitizer, a chemical that is involved in photoelectrochemical processes

== See also ==
- Sensitization (disambiguation)
- Sensitivity (disambiguation)
