= Vanilla Chainsaws =

Former Australian rock band

- Origin: Sydney, New South Wales, Australia
- Genres: Australian rock
- Years active: 1986–1995
- Labels: Phantom; Glitterhouse; Polygram
- Past members: Mark Alexander; Simon Drew; Peter Kelly; Cameron Lee; Duilio Hernandez; Andrew Marks; Chekov Helmke; Henning Worner; Rudy Morabito; Sabina Collins; Murray Shepherd; Gerard Presland

Vanilla Chainsaws were an Australian rock band, which formed in 1986 by Mark Alexander on guitar, Simon John Drew on vocals and guitar, Peter L. W. Kelly on drums and Cameron Lee on bass guitar. They issued two albums, Vanilla Chainsaws (1989) and Red Lights (1991) before disbanding in 1995.

== History ==
Vanilla Chainsaws were formed in Sydney in 1986 as an Australian rock quartet by Mark Alexander on guitar, Simon John Drew on vocals and guitar, Peter L. W. Kelly on drums (ex-Tactics, Flies) and Cameron Lee on bass guitar. Drew later recalled, "Me and Mark weren't really thinking about starting a band at all, but the other two guys said, 'Look, if you're gonna start a band, we'd love to do it'."

They released their debut single, "T.S. (Was It Really Me?)", in August of the following year via Phantom Records. Noise for Heroes' Steve Gardner felt, "[it] was a solid starter with a thick, dense guitar sound and lyrics about turn-of-the-century industrialization..."cities of grey and all that sort of thing." The "T.S." in the title refers to T. S. Eliot, who gets quoted in the song. Jim Dwyer of Tharunka was equivocal, "I still don't know what to think about this debut single [... it] suggests that this band would be well worth seeing live [... and] seems to have a lot of energy that has been toned down in its production [...] If they are as good live as people say they are, this song should explode into sheer energy. Their second single, "Like You", appeared in March 1988. Duilio Hernandez (ex-No Man's Land) replaced Kelly on drums before its release.

The new line-up of Vanilla Chainsaws issued a five-track extended play, Wine Dark Sea, in mid-1988, which was recorded at Blue Harbour and Rich studios with John Bee producing. Gardner described how, "[it] seems to try to go beyond the supercharged sound of the singles, with more moderate tempos and more subtlety." The title track was released as a single in August of that year. The group undertook an overseas tour and were signed to German label, Glitterhouse Records, in 1989. Also in that year they released a self-titled album on that label, which compiled the first two singles and the five-track EP.

The line-up changed again, with Alexander and Drew (now on bass guitar) joined by Andrew Marks on drums. The group toured the East Coast of United States and the United Kingdom. When Marks left they used German musicians, Chekov Helmker on drums and Henning Worner on bass guitar (with Drew back to 2nd guitar), to complete their European tour. In December 1989, while in Germany, they recorded a six-track EP, Thousand (1990), for Glitterhouse, Alexander and Drew were joined by Bill Walsh (of Cosmic Psychos) on drums for the sessions.

Late in 1990, Alexander and Drew returned to Australia, where they were rejoined by Lee and Kelly to undertake an Australian tour in April of the following year. Peter D. J. Kelly joined on bass guitar to record the Red Lights EP, however Lee continued in the band playing bass. In December 1991, Phantom Records issued the group's second album, Red Lights. Peter L. W. Kelly (drums) left the group early in 1992 (he was later a member of New Christs).

== Members ==
- Mark Alexander – guitar
- Simon Drew – vocals, guitar, bass guitar
- Peter Kelly – drums
- Cameron Lee – bass guitar
- Duilio (Jules) Hernandez – drums
- Andrew Marks – drums
- Chekov Helmke – drums
- Henning Worner – bass guitar
- Rudy Morabito – bass guitar
- Sabina Collins – bass guitar
- Gerard Presland
- Murray Shepherd – drums

== Discography ==
=== Albums ===
- Vanilla Chainsaws (compilation album, 1989) – Glitterhouse Records (GR 0053) European release only
- Red Lights (1991) – Phantom Records (PHMCD-17)

=== Extended plays ===
- Wine Dark Sea (mid-1988) – Phantom Records (PHMLP 3)
- Thousand (1990) – Glitterhouse Records (GR 0083)
- Watching Me (1992) – Polygram Records (ID-0005-2)

=== Singles ===
- "T.S. (Was It Really Me?)" (August 1987) – Phantom Records (PH 23)
- "Like You" (March 1988) – Phantom Records (PH 28)
- "Wine Dark Sea" (August 1988) – Phantom Records (PH 32)
