= Purple Avengers =

Australian musical group

- Origin: Brisbane, Queensland, Australia
- Genres: Psychedelic rock, Indie rock
- Years active: 1990–1998, 2010
- Label: Phantom Records
- Past members: Karl Nielsen; Richard Marshall; John Mulroney; Garth Cooke

Purple Avengers was an Australian indie rock band from Brisbane formed in 1990.

== Overview ==
Purple Avengers first formed at the beginning of the 1990s having been four school friends from Brisbane, Australia. The band released two albums, with the first album "Starlights Journey Home" being re-released when the band was signed by Sydney-based label Phantom Records. The band released two more EPs through Phantom Records through the 1990s (Emma Peel Sessions, Dragonfly). Prior to these recordings the Purple Avengers also released an independently recorded and pressed 7" single ("When Will the World Stop Spinning Blues").

The first EP, Emma Peel Sessions, got its name from an amalgam of the 1960s TV icon Emma Peel from The Avengers and influential British music broadcaster John Peel and his long running John Peel Sessions radio show.

The line up consisted of electric guitar, electronic organ, electric bass and drums. The band was strongly influenced by Psychedelic rock and heavy rock sounds, being known for playing long and complex songs in their early performing days in Brisbane. This was balanced by grunge influenced songs of more conventional length as the band developed through the 1990s as it gigged and toured Australia.

The band's song "Another World" was featured on the compilation album, Behind the Banana Curtain by radio station 4ZZZ.

The band reformed in 2010 to play at a one-off show to celebrate BUMS (Brisbane Underground Music Scene) 20 Year Anniversary gig.

== Discography ==
=== Albums ===
- Starlights Journey Home (1992) - independent release by the band
- Starlights Journey Home (1995) - Phantom Records reissue
- Kool Ray (1998)

=== EPs ===
- Emma Peel Sessions (1993)
- Dragonfly (1995)

=== Singles ===
- "When Will the World Stop Spinning Blues" [7" vinyl] (1991)
