= Phantom Records =

Australian record store and record label

- Founded: 1979
- Founder: Dare Jennings, Lee Taylor, John Foy
- Genre: indie rock, indie pop, post-punk, detroit, power-pop, surf
- Country of origin: Australia
- Location: Sydney

Phantom Records was an Australian record store and independent record label established in 1978 on Pitt Street in Sydney. Phantom Records was one of Australia's first indie labels, and the store was known for its guerilla marketing strategies.

== History ==
Phantom Records opened on 17 October 1978 as a record store on Pitt Street in Sydney. The store was opened by Dare Jennings, in partnership with former White Light Records staff Lee Taylor and John Foy. It began with ex-White Light stock and was fronted by a large window, emblazoned with the slogan "Phantom Records – The Big Beat in the Heart of the Vinyl Jungle". During its first months, Jules R. B. Normington, former manager of the import vinyl store Revolver Records and Australian punk band Radio Birdman, worked for the store from Los Angeles, sending rare 60's punk/psychedelic/garage/surf/mod/R&B/soul records to Sydney.

Normington returned to Australia on 9 July 1979 to join Jennings as a managing partner of the store, and Phantom became a specialist store in "punk, soul, surf, psychedelic, sixties garage and nothing else". The store also employed Steve Stavrakis, later the founder of Waterfront Records. In late 1979, Normington and Jennings decided to launch a Phantom record label. Around the same time, John Foy was expanding the store's T-shirt printing business with posters. He named his poster range Skull Printworks. After spending most of 1980 in the US, Foy returned to Phantom T-shirts and continued with Skull Printworks, producing posters for a number of Phantom Records releases. Foy eventually left Phantom to join Red Eye Records, where he established his own independent label of the same name.

On 30 April 1980 the Phantom label released its first single, "Face with No Name" by The Passengers, with "Cool in the Tube" by Surfside 6 following seven days later. Phantom Records went on to release the debut records of bands including the Hoodoo Gurus, Sunnyboys, Flaming Hands, Stephen Cummings, Machinations, The Kelpies, and an early EP by The Cockroaches.

Record covers from the label's releases often featured artwork by local artists such as Libby Blainey, John Foy, Paul Worstead, and Gerard Rouen. Normington and Jennings had plans to license releases from international artists, but only released one single by Stiv Bators and The Dead Boys. All other releases on Phantom were by Australian artists. Although the shop's stock was primarily based on Normington's tastes, artists were only signed to the label when both Normington and Jennings agreed they would buy their records themselves. Phantom inspired other labels such as Waterfront Records and Citadel Records catering to the emerging local scene.

The label's momentum slowed in the mid 1980s. During this period, Jennings began to focus on his 100% Mambo clothing company and gradually reduced his role with Phantom, and Normington was focused on the range of records and magazines available in the store.

In 1987 Normington renewed his interest in the label, with releases by The Hummingbirds, The Sparklers, The Deadly Hume, The Mark of Cain, Even As We Speak and Vanilla Chainsaws. In the late 1980s, Normington formed a small new label called Messiah Complex devoted to "crushing and fierce garage-punk and grunge 45's only", which released records by Big Chief, Superchunk, Mudrac, Sugar Shack, and Sydney punk band Downtime.

After several years, with Jennings leaving the company altogether, Sebastian Chase, formerly of rooArt Records, became a partner in Phantom Records. In 1991 Chase had left rooArt after a split with partner Chris Murphy, and approached Phantom. Normington and Chase signed bands including Def FX and the Whitlams, and formed a subsidiary label called Freakzone, which released the first several releases by funk band SWOOP.

Eventually, Phantom was divided into three companies: the shop, the record labels, and a music collectibles arm. Normington increasingly focused on Phantom Collectibles. Every three or four months, he published auction catalogues under the title: "Plunder The Vaults". Finally, the label declined in activity due to business differences between Chase and Normington, and the shop closed in April 1998. In 1999, Normington formed Laughing Outlaw Records with writer Stuart Coupe as a partner. Normington left Phantom in 2000 to run a music collectables business, cutting his ties with Laughing Outlaw two years later.

== Notable artists ==
First phase (Jennings and Normington)

- Sunnyboys
- The Visitors
- Le Hoodoo Gurus
- Machinations
- The Cockroaches
- Sardine v
- The Rockmelons

Second phase (Normington only)

- Shrinking Violets
- The Hummingbirds
- Even As We Speak
- Vanilla Chainsaws
- The Mark of Cain
- Crow

Third phase (Normington and Chase)

- Def FX
- Nitocris
- The Whitlams
- Purple Avengers
- Bugbears
- MeMeMe
- Burning Winter

== See also ==
- List of record labels
