= Northern Picture Library =

British dream pop group

- Origin: United Kingdom
- Genres: Dream pop, ambient pop
- Years active: 1993–1995
- Labels: Vinyl Japan, Sarah Records, LTM
- Past members: Bobby Wratten; Anne Mari Davies; Mark Dobson

Northern Picture Library was a British dream pop group, formed in 1993 by Bobby Wratten and Anne Mari Davies, both former members of The Field Mice. They were soon joined by former Field Mice drummer Mark Dobson.

The group adopted a more abstract, ambient and synthesiser-based sound than the more guitar pop approach of The Field Mice. Their debut single, "Love Song For The Dead Che", was a cover of a song by 1960s psychedelic group United States of America. Both it and the following album, Alaska, won critical acclaim, however sales were poor even compared to The Field Mice's records. The group members' personal problems (various members succumbed to depression, stagefright and substance abuse) made touring difficult and thus also made it difficult for the group to promote their records effectively. Two more EPs followed before the group dissolved. Wratten later went on to form Trembling Blue Stars with Davies also joining the group in a later incarnation.

In 2005 the entire Northern Picture Library back catalogue was released on two CDs on the LTM label.

== Discography ==
=== Singles ===
- "Love Song for the Dead Che" (12"/CD, Vinyl Japan, September 1993)
- "Blue Dissolve EP" (12"/CD, Vinyl Japan, June 1994)
- "Paris EP" (CD, Sarah Records, September 1994)

The "Paris EP" was also issued as two separate 7" singles, "Paris" and "Last September's Farewell Kiss".

=== Albums ===
- Alaska (1994)
- Still Life (singles compilation, 2000)
- Postscript (singles and out-takes, 2004)

=== Musicians ===
- Robert Wratten - Guitars, vocals
- Anne Mari Davies - vocals, keyboards
- Rob Waters - Bass
- Mark Dobson - drums
- Ian Catt - Production, Samplers
