= Trembling Blue Stars =

British band

Trembling Blue Stars was the London-based band music project of Robert Wratten, started in 1996. Later consisting of Harvey Williams, Jonathan Akerman, Keris Howard, Michael Hiscock, and Beth Arzy who replaced Annemari Davies in 2000. Initially begun as a side project of Wratten's previous band Northern Picture Library, Trembling Blue Stars became Wratten's main band when Northern Picture Library broke up in 1995. Wratten took the name of his band from The Story of O by Pauline Réage. Trembling Blue Stars are characterized by melancholic songs with shimmering guitars and introspective lyrics. Many of their early lyrics address Wratten's relationship with Annemari Davies, who had been in The Field Mice and Northern Picture Library with him. AllMusic lists New Order, Orchestral Manoeuvres in the Dark and Scott Walker among the group's influences.

The first Trembling Blue Stars album, Her Handwriting, was released in 1996 on Shinkansen Recordings (the successor of Sarah Records), to critical acclaim. Wratten afterwards assembled a band, which at various times included Davies, Gemma Townley, Cath Carroll and Ian Catt, as well as Michael Hiscock, Keris Howard (previously of the Sarah Records-era band Brighter) and Harvey Williams. Producer Ian Catt has worked on every Trembling Blue Stars release.

Lips That Taste of Tears, the band's second album, was released in April 1997. The album received acclaim again, although the group proved reluctant to tour extensively. Broken By Whispers, their third long player, was released in 2000 and saw them getting more press and radio play. "Dark Eyes" was voted Single of the Week on Mark Radcliffe's show on BBC Radio 1. The overall mood was melancholic, but Broken By Whispers saw the band experimenting with more bass and synth sounds. Indeed, this album was picked up by Seattle's Sub Pop Records and gave the band their first release in North America. They also recorded a live session on the John Peel show in 2001.

In 2001, Trembling Blue Stars released Alive To Every Smile, which still featured Annemari Davies on vocals, along with Beth Arzy. The album was widely acclaimed and added more synth and beats, notably to one of their best known songs, "The Ghost of an Unkissed Kiss", which combined a dance-pop sensibility with more traditional indie sounds. Multiple EP releases appeared in between albums. The band also gathered together singles for the compilation A Certain Evening Light in 2003. In 2005, their fifth album The Seven Autumn Flowers was released on Bar/None Records in both the USA and UK after a break with Shinkansen. A brief mini-tour of the US in late 2005 promoted it. Their sixth album The Last Holy Writer was released through Elefant Records in 2007, with tracks from it featured in the Australian feature film The Sculptor.

Trembling Blue Stars issued their seventh album Fast Trains and Telegraph Wires in October 2010, but split at the end of that year following the release of a final farewell EP, Correspondence.

== Discography ==
=== Albums ===
- Her Handwriting, April 1996
- Lips That Taste of Tears, February 1998
- Broken by Whispers, February 2000
- Alive to Every Smile, October 2001
- The Seven Autumn Flowers, January 2005
- The Last Holy Writer, April 2007
- Fast Trains and Telegraph Wires, October 2010

=== EPs/Singles ===
- ABBA on the Jukebox, 1996
- The Rainbow, November 1997
- Dark Eyes, October 1999
- Doo-Wop Music, 1999
- She Just Couldn't Stay, January 2000
- Ghost of an Unkissed Kiss, September 2001
- Slow Soft Sighs, April 2002
- Southern Skies Appear Brighter, June 2004
- Bathed In Blue, March 2005
- Beautiful Blank, 2007
- Exploring the Shadows, November 2007
- Correspondence, 2011

=== Anthologies ===
- A Certain Evening Light, June 2003

=== Side Projects ===
The Occasional Keepers, The Beauty of an Empty Vessel, 2005

Love Goes On (Tribute to Grant McLennan), November 2007

Future Conditional, We Don't Just Disappear, 2007

The Occasional Keepers, True North, 2008

== See also ==
- The Field Mice
- Northern Picture Library
- Aberdeen
