= The Orchids =

Scottish band

The Orchids are a Scottish band. Formed in Penilee in Glasgow in 1985, the Orchids released a series of underground singles on Sarah Records. The group's line-up was James Hackett (vocals), Pauline Hynds Bari (vocals), John Scally (guitar), Chris Quinn (drums), Matthew Drummond (guitar), and James Moody (bass). Their producer, Ian Carmichael, often played keyboards on their records. They changed their line-up in 1993 when Moody left. Ronnie Borland, a long time collaborator and supporter of the band, then took over on bass. They went quiet after their 1994 album release, their last on Sarah Records, resurfacing in 1995 to play at the Sarah Records farewell party. After that they took a break until 2004 when they reformed.

Starting with a melancholy guitar pop sound on Lyceum and contemporaneous singles, they moved on to become more keyboard and sample/effects-based for their second and third albums, Unholy Soul and Striving For the Lazy Perfection, developing a more electronic sound, possibly as a result of their producer, Ian Carmichael, who was a member of dance band One Dove.

Their entire back catalogue was re-released on CD on LTM in 2005. In 2007, they released their fourth album, Good to Be a Stranger. The album was issued on Madrid based label Siesta, with the band playing live gigs for the first time in eleven years. In 2010, the group released a fifth album, The Lost Star, through Pebble Records, mixed by a returning Ian Carmichael. In October 2014, they released their sixth album, Beatitude#9, under another Spanish record label, Acurela.

In September 2017, to celebrate the 30th anniversary of their first physical release (a flexi disc on the sha la la label), they released a retrospective featuring 20 "best of" songs from their singles and albums, plus an 18 track rarities disc. Titled, Who Needs Tomorrow... A 30 Year Retrospective, was released on Cherry Red Records.

Their most recent album, Dreaming Kind, was released on Skep Wax Records on 2 September 2022.

== Discography ==
=== Singles ===
- "I've Got A Habit" (Sarah 2, February 1988)
- "Underneath The Window, Underneath The Sink" (Sarah 11, November 1988)
- "What Will We Do Next" (Sarah 23, September 1989)
- "An Ill Wind That Blows" (Caff Records 11, September 1990)
- "Something For The Longing" (Sarah 29, February 1990)
- "Penetration EP" (Sarah 42, February 1991)
- "Thaumaturgy" (Sarah 66, September 1992)
- "She's My Girl" (Pebble 001, May 2010)
- "The Way That She Moves" (Pebble 009,

=== Albums ===
- Lyceum (Sarah 401, August 1989)
- Unholy Soul (Sarah 605, May 1991)
- Striving For the Lazy Perfection (Sarah 617, January 1994)
- Good to Be a Stranger (Siesta 226, February 2007)
- The Lost Star (Pebble 002, October 2010)
- Beatitude#9 (Acuarela, October 2014)
- Dreaming Kind (Skep Wax, 2022)

The first three of these albums were reissued with bonus tracks on LTM in 2005.

=== Compilation albums ===
- Epicurean (Sarah, August 1992)
- Who Needs Tomorrow... A 30 Year Retrospective (Cherry Red Records, September 2017)

== See also ==
- List of bands from Glasgow
- List of Scottish musicians
