= Sensitivity =

Sensitivity may refer to:

== Science and technology ==
=== Natural sciences ===
- Sensitivity (physiology), the ability of an organism or organ to respond to external stimuli
  - Sensory processing sensitivity, a personality trait in humans
- Sensitivity and specificity, statistical measures of the performance of binary classification tests
- antimicrobial susceptibility, often called "sensitivity"
- Allergic sensitivity, the strength of a reaction to an allergen
- The inverse of resistance (ecology), the ability of populations to remain stable when subject to disturbance

=== Electronics ===
- Sensitivity (electronics). Two contrasting definitions of sensitivity are used in the field of electronic sensors and instruments
  - Sensitivity first definition: the ratio between output and input signal, or the slope of the output versus input response curve of a transducer, microphone or sensor
  - Sensitivity second definition: the minimum magnitude of input signal required to produce an output signal with a specified signal-to-noise ratio of an instrument or sensor
    - Sensitivity in a receiver indicates the receiver's capability to extract information from a weak signal

=== Mathematics ===
- Sensitivity (control systems), variations in process dynamics and control systems
- Sensitivity analysis, apportionment of the uncertainty in the output of a mathematical model among its inputs
- Sensitivity and specificity, statistical measures of the performance of binary classification tests

=== Other uses ===
- Sensitivity (explosives), the degree to which an explosive can be initiated by impact, heat or friction
- Film speed, photographic film's sensitivity to light

== Entertainment ==
- "Sensitivity" (Shapeshifters song), the fourth single from music group Shapeshifters
- "Sensitivity" (song), a song by rhythm and blues singer Ralph Tresvant
- "Sensitivity" (Suspects), a 2014 television episode

== Other uses ==
- Information sensitivity, a property of information that may result in damage if disclosed
- Price sensitivity, in economics

== See also ==
- Sensibility
- Sensitization (disambiguation)
- Sensitizer (disambiguation)
