= Snowball (album) =

Studio album by the Field Mice
- Released: 1989
- Genre: Twee pop; jangle pop; dream pop
- Length: 33:56
- Label: Sarah

The Field Mice chronology
| Snowball (1989) | Skywriting (1990) |

2005 Reissue cover

Professional ratings
Review scores
| Source | Rating |
|---|---|
| AllMusic | 3/5 stars |
| NME | 7/10 link |
| Pitchfork | 7.8/10 |
| Stylus Magazine | B− link |

Snowball is the debut album by the English band the Field Mice. It was originally released as a 10" vinyl LP in 1989 through Sarah Records.

== Track listing ==
1. "Let's Kiss and Make Up" – 6:13
2. "You're Kidding Aren't You" – 2:30
3. "End of the Affair" – 4:14
4. "Couldn't Feel Safer" – 3:47
5. "This Love Is Not Wrong" – 3:21
6. "Everything About You" – 2:30
7. "White" – 4:17
8. "Letting Go" – 6:33

=== 2005 bonus tracks ===
The following tracks appear on the 2005 reissue of the album from LTM recordings.

9. "Sensitive"
10. "When Morning Comes to Town"
11. "Emma's House"
12. "When You Sleep"
13. "Fabulous Friend"
14. "The Last Letter"
15. "I Can See Myself Alone Forever"
16. "Everything About You" (alternate version)
17. "That's All This Is"
