= Even as We Speak =

Australian indie band

Even As We Speak
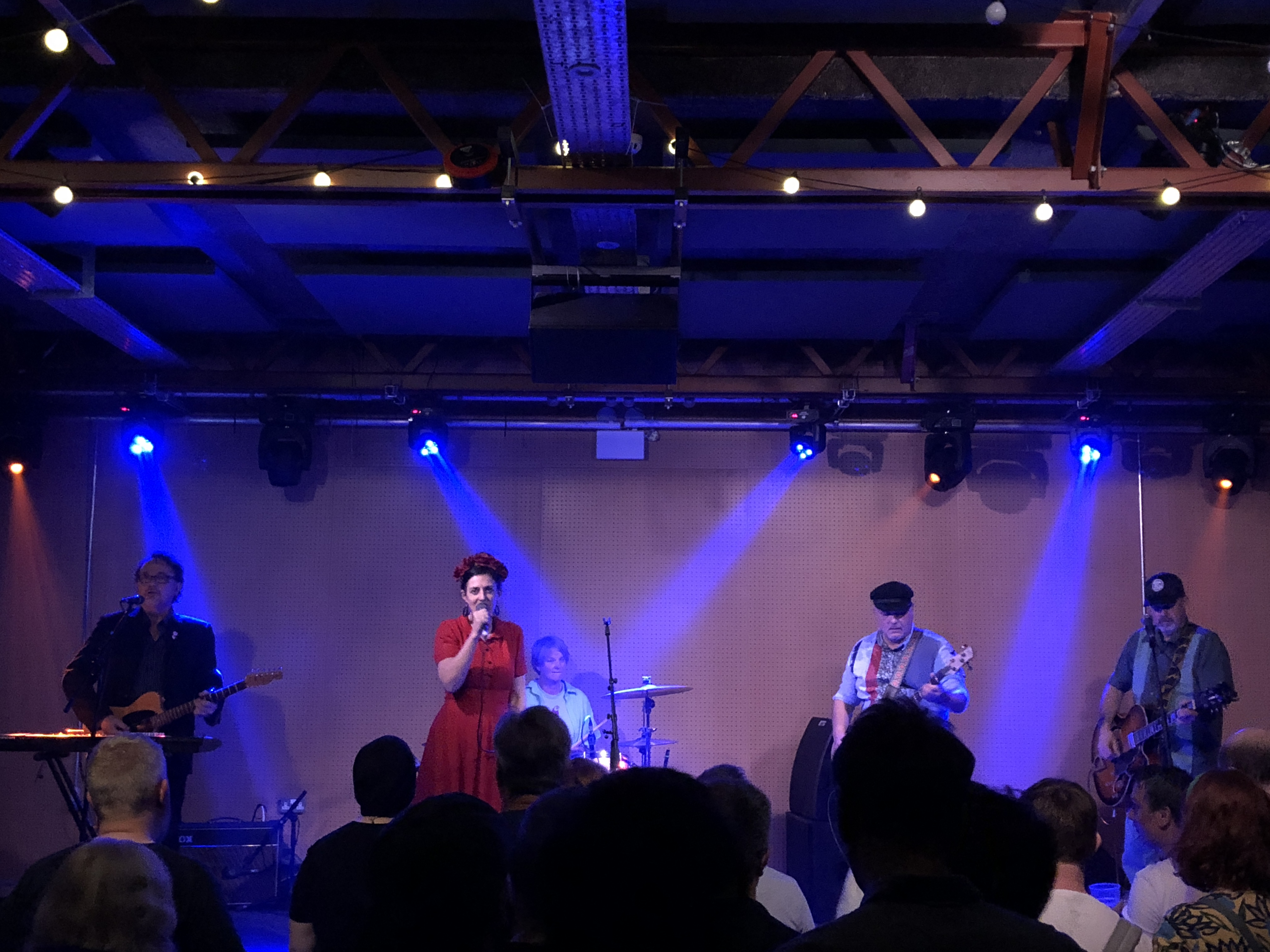
- Even as We Speak performing live at Brudenell Social Club, Leeds, UK in 2018

Background information
- Origin: Australia
- Genres: Indie pop, indie rock
- Years active: 1986–present
- Labels: Sarah Records, Phantom Records, Egg Records, Big Home Productions, Emotional Response Records
- Members: Mary Wyer; Matthew Love; Rob Irwin; Julian Knowles; Anita Rayner
- Past members: Neil Johnson; Scott Leishman; Bjarn; Paul Clarke; Paul Field

Even As We Speak is an Australian indie band from Sydney. Formed in the mid-1980s, founding members Matthew Love (guitar, banjo, vocals) and Mary Wyer (vocals, guitar) were later joined by Rob Irwin (bass) Anita Rayner (drums, banjo, mandolin), Paul Clarke (guitar, vocals), and Julian Knowles (keyboards, guitar, production). Their albums include Feral Pop Frenzy (1993); A Three Minute Song Is One Minute Too Long (2005); Yellow Food: The Peel Sessions (2014); Feral Pop Frenzy (2018); and Adelphi (2020), as well as many singles and EPs.

== History ==
After a series of vinyl releases on Australian independent labels including Phantom Records, and success on the Australian indie scene, they came to the attention of BBC Radio 1 DJ John Peel who started to play the band's Phantom Records single "Goes So Slow" on his show. This brought them to the attention of UK audiences and began a relationship with British indie label Sarah Records. The band released several singles and an album on Sarah Records, three of which reached the Top 5 of the Melody Maker and New Musical Express UK independent music charts in 1992 and 1993.

Between 1992 and 1993, the group recorded three sessions for John Peel and one session for Mark Goodier for BBC Radio 1. They were among the few Australian bands to record Peel Sessions – others were The Birthday Party, The Triffids, The Go-Betweens, and Laughing Clowns. These sessions were released as the album Yellow Food: The Peel Sessions in June 2014. A session was also recorded for Radio France.

Wyer formed a pop rock band, Her Name in Lights, which issued their debut album, Into the Light Again, in October 2004. Egg Records of Glasgow has compiled Even As We Speak's five Australian vinyl singles into a 17-song CD, A Three Minute Song is One Minute Too Long (2007).

In 2016, the band reformed (minus Paul Clarke) to play NYC Popfest, and added some further shows to mark the release of Yellow Food: The Peel Sessions, a compilation album of the complete sessions recorded for the BBC between 1992 and 1993. This led to the band recording and releasing a 5-track EP of new material,The Black Forest on 10-inch vinyl and CD through Emotional Response Records in the US in September 2017.

In 2018, a 25-year re-issue of the Sarah Records LP Feral Pop Frenzy was released on Emotional Response Records and also as a Rough Trade coloured vinyl exclusive in the UK and US. The band toured the UK in July 2018 headlining a bill with a classic Sarah Records lineup of Secret Shine, Boyracer, and Action Painting!, finishing with a headline slot on the Loco Stage at the Indietracks festival.

The full-length album Adelphi was released 24 July 2020 on Shelflife Records. A music video for the song "Leaves" from the album was shot by cinematographer Bonnie Elliott and directed by Matias Bolla, featuring Wyer's daughter Manar.

== Discography ==
=== Albums ===
- Feral Pop Frenzy (1993), Sarah Records – 12-inch/CD
- Feral Pop Frenzy (1993), Quattro – Japan CD, includes extra tracks
- A Three Minute Song Is One Minute Too Long (2005), Egg Records – CD compilation
- Yellow Food: The Peel Sessions (2014), Feral Pop Records – digital release
- Yellow Food: The Peel Sessions (2017), Emotional Response Records – U.S. limited edition CD
- Feral Pop Frenzy (2018), Emotional Response Records – U.S. 25-year 12-inch red/white spatter vinyl reissue
- Feral Pop Frenzy (2018), Rough Trade Records – exclusive 25-year white vinyl reissue
- Adelphi (2020), Shelflife Records

=== Singles and EPs ===
- "Small Fish in a Big Machine" (1986), Voyeur Records – 7-inch 45 rpm
- I Won't Have to Think About You (1987), Big Home Productions – 7-inch EP
- "Blue Suburban Skies" (1987), Big Home Productions – 7-inch 45 rpm
- "Goes So Slow" (1989), Phantom Records – limited edition red 7-inch vinyl
- Outgrown This Town (1990), Phantom Records – 12-inch EP
- Nothing Ever Happens (1990), Sarah Records – 7-inch EP
- One Step Forward (1991), Sarah Records – 7-inch 33⅓ rpm EP
- "Beautiful Day" (1991), Sarah Records – 7-inch
- Blue Eyes Deceiving Me (1993), Sarah Records – 7-inch/CD EP
- "Even As We Speak/In a Day" (2000), Gifted Records – 7-inch 33⅓ rpm split single
- "Such a Good Feeling" (2017), Emotional Response Records – U.S. digital release
- The Black Forest (2017), Emotional Response Records – U.S. 10-inch vinyl, CD and digital EP
- "Blue Suburban Skies" (2020), Optic Nerve Records – U.K. 7-inch 45 rpm (Limited edition coloured vinyl)

== See also ==
- List of Peel Sessions
