= Another Sunny Day =

Indie pop band

- Origin: London, England
- Genres: Indie pop
- Years active: 1986–1992
- Labels: Sarah
- Past members: Harvey Williams; Michael Hiscock; Bob Wratten; Julien Henry; Matthew Drummond

Another Sunny Day was an indie pop solo project of Harvey Williams, signed to Sarah Records. Williams later recorded two albums under his own name.

== History ==
The band was a solo project for Harvey Williams (born in Newlyn, Cornwall), started while studying at Plymouth Polytechnic in 1986. Williams graduated and then pursued a career in music. Williams signed a deal with Sarah Records and the first Another Sunny Day release was the "Anorak City" flexi-disc in April 1988, which came with the Are You Scared To Get Happy? fanzine, and was named 'Single of the Week' by NME. The debut single proper was "I'm in Love with a Girl Who Doesn't Know I Exist", released two months later, which was again named 'Single of the Week'. Williams relocated to London in early 1989. The next release was in May 1989 – the "What's Happened?" single, followed later that year by "You Should All Be Murdered" and a limited 7-inch single on Bob Stanley's Caff label, with a cover version of Orchestral Manoeuvres in the Dark's "Genetic Engineering". While Williams recorded alone, he was joined by friends including Bobby Wratten, Michael Hiscock and Matthew Drummond for live shows. A couple more singles preceded the only Another Sunny Day album, London Weekend. Williams then joined Blueboy, before recording under his own name, releasing one album on Sarah and one on Shinkansen Records, and later went on to collaborate on several records by other groups including The Field Mice (for whom he became a permanent member) and The Hit Parade. Harvey Williams was working at the BBC in 2002, while also a member of Trembling Blue Stars.

Cherry Red Records re-issued the London Weekend album in August 2009; This release included six additional tracks: "Genetic Engineering", "Kilburn Towers", "It's OK If You Don't Love Me", "The Boy From St Ives", "I'm In Love With a Girl Who Doesn't Know I Exist" (four-track version), "Things Will Be Nice" (four-track version).

== Discography ==
=== Singles ===
Title	Release date	Label	Notes	UK Independent Singles Chart
"Anorak City"	1988	Sarah	6" flexi-disc	
"I'm in Love with a Girl Who Doesn't Know I Exist"	1988	Sarah		12
"What's Happened"	1989	Sarah		19
"You Should All Be Murdered"	1989	Sarah		15
"Genetic Engineering"	1989	CAFF		
"Rio"	1990	Sarah		
"New Year's Honours"	1992	Sarah		

=== Albums ===
- London Weekend (1992) Sarah - compilation

=== Compilation appearances ===
- "I Want You" on Something's Burning in Paradise (1988)

=== as Harvey Williams ===
- Rebellion (1994), Sarah
- California (1998), Shinkansen

=== with The Hit Parade ===
- Sixteen Weeks (1993), Polystar
