= The Field Mice =

English indie pop band

- Origin: London, England
- Genres: Indie pop; twee pop
- Years active: 1987–1991
- Label: Sarah Records
- Past members: Robert Wratten (Bobby Wratten); Michael Hiscock; Harvey Williams; Mark Dobson; Anne Mari Davies

The Field Mice were an English indie pop band on the independent record label Sarah Records. Originally a two-piece but ultimately expanding to five members, they released three albums and numerous singles and EPs on the label, recorded a session for John Peel and had top 20 success in both the UK Independent singles and albums charts.

== Career ==
The Field Mice initially formed as a duo from the south London suburb of Mitcham comprising Robert Wratten (vocals and guitar) and Michael Hiscock (bass guitar). The pair had first met in the lower sixth form at Tamworth Manor School as 16-year-olds, drifting apart until being reunited following a chance meeting in the Croydon branch of Our Price two years later. Wratten and Hiscock were initially inspired by post-punk bands including Joy Division, New Order and Echo & the Bunnymen.

The group's first single, "Emma's House", was released in November 1988, and reached number 20 in the UK Independent Chart. But it was with their second single "Sensitive" that they first received significant critical attention, with the unique feat of Les Inrockuptibles naming it a unanimous single of the month among their writers, giving them a top-20 indie hit and with a subsequent placing in John Peel's 1989 Festive Fifty. Debut mini-album Snowball reached number 3 on the UK Indie Albums Chart.

The original duo were joined by Harvey Williams (of Another Sunny Day) on guitar in July 1989, initially to bolster the band's live sound, the two-part The Autumn Store single set having been still recorded as a two-piece, with the first recorded fruits of this new line-up being the Skywriting mini-LP and the So Said Kay EP. Williams was less entrenched in the group's established post-punk influences; he introduced Wratten to the Beach Boys' catalogue, and the pair further bonded over shared inspirations such as Kraftwerk, OMD and the Jam.

In late 1990 the band then expanded further to include Anne Mari Davies (whose bandmate in The Purple Tulips Chris Cox handed Wratten a demo cassette and letter from her when The Field Mice supported The Wake at the University of Sheffield) on vocals, keyboards and guitar, and Mark Dobson (whom the band had first met at the Camden Falcon on the occasion of Williams' live debut) on drums. This five-piece line-up later recorded what was to be their final album, For Keeps.

Over a five-year career, the band were often dogged with the reputation of having a post-C86 indie pop, or generic Sarah Records sound, despite producing tracks with numerous styles and influences. Early singles and even their sleeves harked back to early Factory Records bands such as New Order and The Wake, with many tracks often featuring sequencers and samples. Many of the group's recordings, notably "Triangle" and their epic seven-minute swan song, "Missing the Moon" (the second of their two Festive Fifty entries), displayed a strong influence from the popular dance music of the time. Most of the group's records were produced by Ian Catt, whose studio was in his parents' house's spare bedroom and was just around the corner from where Wratten lived. Catt later went on to develop the pop dance sound of "Missing the Moon" further with Saint Etienne (whose second single was a cover version of the Field Mice's "Let's Kiss and Make Up").

== Split and legacy ==
The Field Mice split up in 1991 after a fractious tour to promote the For Keeps album, during which, at King Tut's Wah Wah Hut in Glasgow, Wratten announced to the rest of the band he was leaving. The following date, at Tufnell Park Dome in London, proved to be the band's final act.

Later, Wratten and Davies, who had begun a relationship during the last year of the band's existence, briefly formed Yesterday Sky with Dobson before the trio became the more synth-oriented outfit Northern Picture Library. Following the end of his relationship with Davies, Wratten went on to form Trembling Blue Stars in 1995 and then Lightning in a Twilight Hour. Hiscock's later band The Gentle Spring released their debut album, Looking Back at the World, in 2025.

A double-album compilation of the now long-deleted Field Mice releases, Where'd You Learn to Kiss That Way?, was released in 1998 and sold more copies than any Field Mice record ever sold at the time. Their entire back catalogue was reissued on CD for the first time by LTM Recordings in 2005.

== Discography ==
Studio albums

- Snowball (Sarah 402, 1989)
- Skywriting (Sarah 601, 1990)
- For Keeps (Sarah 607, 1991)

Compilation albums

- Coastal (Sarah 606, 1991)
- Where'd You Learn to Kiss That Way? (Shinkansen 014, 1998)

Singles and extended plays

- "Emma's House" (7", Sarah 012, 1988)
- "Sensitive" (7", Sarah 018, 1989)
- "I Can See Myself Alone Forever" b/w "Everything About You" (7", CAFF 2, 1989)
- "The Autumn Store Part 1" (7", Sarah 024, 1990)
- "The Autumn Store Part 2" (7", Sarah 025, 1990)
- So Said Kay (10", Sarah 038, 1990)
- "September's Not So Far Away" b/w "Between Hello and Goodbye" (7", Sarah 044, 1991)
- "Missing the Moon" (12", Sarah 057, 1991)
- "Burning World" (Loop cover) (7", BULL 4–0, 1991)

Peel session

- "Anoint"/"Sundial"/"Fresh Surroundings"/"By Degrees" (Recorded on 1 April 1990 and originally broadcast on John Peel's radio programme, on 23 April 1990 on BBC Radio 1). All four songs were written specially for this session and were not released on any of their records.
