= Sarah Records =

British independent record label

- Founded: November 1987
- Founder: Clare Wadd and Matt Haynes
- Defunct: August 1995
- Genre: C86; Indie pop Twee pop
- Country of origin: United Kingdom
- Location: Bristol, England
- Official website: Sarah Records Website

Sarah Records was a British independent record label active in Bristol between 1987 and 1995, best known for its recordings of indie pop, which it released mostly on 7" singles. On reaching the catalogue number SARAH 100, the label celebrated its 100th release by throwing a party and shutting itself down. In March 2015, NME declared Sarah to be the second greatest indie label of all time, behind only 4AD.

== Origins ==
The label was formed in Bristol in 1987 by Clare Wadd and Matt Haynes and grew out of the fanzine scene at the time, Haynes having previously edited Are You Scared To Get Happy? and Wadd Kvatch. Both these fanzines had given away flexidiscs, with Are You Scared To Get Happy? being part of the Sha-la-la organisation, a record label set up solely to produce flexidiscs. Several Sarah releases were fanzines and flexidiscs as, along with the 7"s, it was thought they summed up the aesthetic and politics of the label better than 12" singles and albums. The label also refused to participate in the multi-formatting that was common at the time, or even include singles on albums, feeling that these practices were unfair on fans. In 1990 Wadd and Haynes told Melody Maker that it was "a record company run from a record buyer’s point of view ... you shouldn’t rip off the people who support you".

== Music ==
Sarah Records was usually perceived as being grounded in the jangly indie-pop sensibility of C86 – though greater influences included the late Seventies DIY scene and stylish, imaginative independent labels such as Postcard Records, Factory and Creation; as well as mid-Eighties fanzine culture. Many Sarah bands, notably The Field Mice and The Orchids, also experimented with dance sounds. Other bands on the label included Heavenly, East River Pipe, The Hit Parade, Even As We Speak, Boyracer, Brighter, Blueboy, Another Sunny Day, Shelley and St. Christopher.

== Politics ==
"It's just POLITICS, not as some distant unreal end, but as something encaptured in everyday life" declared the sleevenotes to the label's first compilation LP, Shadow Factory, and the label always saw itself as political, a response to its years of operation being "the years when CDs took over and vinyl died, when majors set up fake indies and indie became a genre not an ideology ... the years of Margaret Thatcher and John Major, of Clause 28 and the Poll Tax; the years when Lad Culture took hold." Because much of the politics was represented by the label's actions rather than its music, this aspect of Sarah was often missed; but Wadd and Haynes always hoped that those buying the records would discover the politics “by osmosis. One day, they’d suddenly stop and think, ‘Hang on, why do I have to spend £3.49 on this Pastels twelve-inch from Creation when the Sea Urchins seven-inch on Sarah only costs £1.49 and they both have three songs on?’ And then they’d set fire to the Houses of Parliament.” Haynes did admit, though, that "few people spotted that our sleeves didn’t use the female image as decoration, that singles didn’t appear on albums (except compilations), and that compilations didn’t include ‘previously unreleased’ tracks, so maybe our politics was too subtle." The politics was also always tempered by humour: 12" singles were used as a self-consciously hyperbolic metaphor for capitalism, the capitalist mindset of record collectors was mocked by randomly distributing postcards that formed a jigsaw of Bristol Temple Meads railway station in the sleeves of ten 7"s whose labels featured photos of consecutive stations on the local Severn Beach Line, and the label announced its Autumn 1992 release schedule by taking out quarter-page adverts in the music press, denouncing capitalism and the refusal of bands to accept responsibility for their own marketing practices.

== Bristol ==
Being based in Bristol was very important to Sarah; despite neither being from Bristol, both Wadd and Haynes loved the city and wanted to make the political point that to run a successful record label you didn't have to move to London. Each 7" single featured a picture of the city on its centre label, the label's compilation albums were named after places in and around Bristol (and numbered after the buses that went there) and the city's road layout provided the board for Saropoly – the board game about running an indie record label (packaged as a 7" single) that was the label's fiftieth release.

== Press response ==
Although Sarah releases were featured 15 times as Singles of the Week in NME and Melody Maker, the UK press was mostly hostile, something Wadd and Haynes attributed to male journalists missing the point, being annoyed by it, or worrying that liking a label with a girl's name, co-run by a woman, would bring their own masculinity into question.

The sexism of the music press was a major issue for the label. As Wadd wrote in a letter to Melody Maker, "your treatment of women reinforces the status quo of a woman’s role being largely decorative – an object, a stage-prop to be placed at the front of photos … a puppet to smile and dance while the boys at the back (the 'brains') pull the strings. It’s hard enough for a woman to carve herself an independent role in music. Stupid basic things like going to gigs on your own and getting back afterwards have to be considered on top of society’s everyday constraints … Add to that the implicit criterion that to succeed you need to be physically desirable. What about the not-so-beautiful, the women who aren’t so confident about their appearance/sexuality? … You end up with half the population having no creative input.

"Yet even that is eerily disguised because it’s always the purely stereotypical (and therefore hardly qualifying as positive discrimination) FEMALE image within a band that the male writer/camera seeks out." The label was always better received outside the UK, with bands playing to big audiences in Europe and Japan, and, after the label had ended, the attitude of the UK press gradually shifted. In March 2015, NME put Sarah at number 2 in its list of greatest indie labels of all time, saying "Sarah’s legacy is in thinking gloriously big, and believing that a label is more than a catalogue of disparate releases."

== Ending and aftermath ==
=== A day for destroying things ===
Sarah ceased operations in August 1995 with the release of There and Back Again Lane, a booklet telling the story of the label along with a CD of representative tracks. A party was held on the Thekla, a boat moored in Bristol's Floating Harbour, and half-page adverts entitled "a day for destroying things" were taken out in both NME and Melody Maker. "We don't do encores", the advert announced, and the label has stuck by this sentiment, with no further releases.

=== Retrospective film, books and exhibition ===
A film about the label, My Secret World, made by Lucy Dawkins for Yes Please! Productions, was previewed at the Arnolfini Gallery in Bristol on 3 May 2014 as part of the exhibition 'Between Hello and Goodbye: The Secret World of Sarah Records', and had its official premiere at the Hackney Picturehouse in London on 12 April 2015. A book, Popkiss: The Life and Afterlife of Sarah Records, by Michael White, was published by Bloomsbury on 19 November 2015. On 16 October 2023, a second book about Sarah Records was published, called These Things Happen: The Sarah Records Story, written by Jane Duffus. This hardback book contains interviews with members of every single band signed to the label, as well as a large number of previously unseen pictures.

=== Shinkansen Recordings ===
After Sarah ended, Haynes established Shinkansen Recordings in 1996. Named after the Japanese "bullet train", the label was originally going to be called "Metropolitan", but there was already a record label of that name. Shinkansen released new recordings by ex-Sarah artists (including Blueboy and Harvey Williams) as well as other acts including Fosca, Trembling Blue Stars and Tompot Blenny. Haynes went on to edit a zine, Smoke: a London Peculiar, dedicated to writing and art inspired by London.

== See also ==
- Sarah Records discography
- List of record labels
- List of independent UK record labels
