= Scarlet's Well =

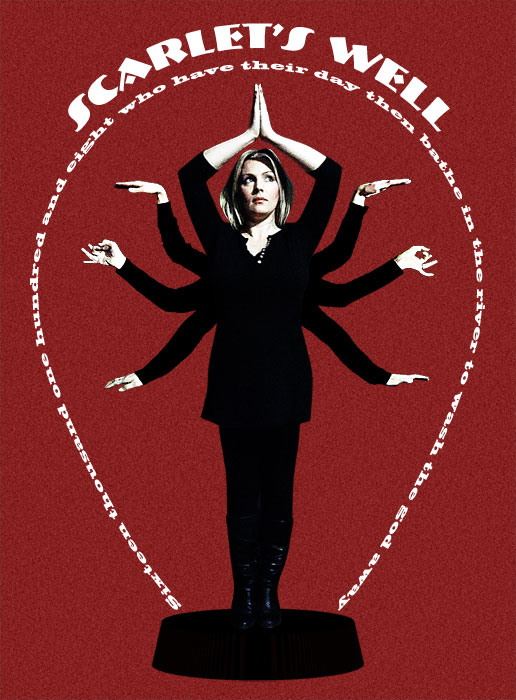

Background information
- Genres: Indie pop
- Years active: 1998–2010
- Website: scarletswell.co.uk

Scarlet's Well were a British pop band formed in 1998 by Bid of The Monochrome Set, after the latter band amicably split for the second time.

They originally started as a studio project, the first four albums featuring a total of ten lead vocalists, including Bid (the only male voice), Zarif and Alice Healey, the latter being the only member other than Bid who has appeared on all albums.

A live band was formed at the beginning of 2004, with the help of Dickon Edwards, who appeared as lead guitarist at the first gig. Since then, they have been through various line-up changes with the last listed below.

Using a wide range of instruments on the albums ("rock", folk and orchestral), the music has been variously described as "gypsy folk to English psychedelic rock", "hybrid English pop and Baroque music", "a rich, lush and densely layered confection", and "sprightly guitar pop".

Conceptually "an ongoing and open-ended musical", set partly in a fictitious village in South West England called Mousseron ("a sickly village situated somewhere east of the Azores, and only slightly north of the Styx", many of the songs are "richly-textured, well-spun yarns driven by a cast of colourful eccentrics", yet "the songs still function as pop in the sweetest sense".

Though most of the material was written by Bid, collaborators have included Alex Kapranos ("The Spell" on the "Strange Letters" album) and David Shrigley ("Maybe", though this song only appeared on his "Worried Noodles" album); past and present members of the band have also contributed, with some lyrics made of poems by Christina Rossetti, Alfred, Lord Tennyson, and Edgar Allan Poe.

A few of the songs are supposed to have been material never completed by The Monochrome Set ("Miss Twinkle's Been on Holiday Again", "Why Do Spirits Haunt Ruby Auburn?", "My Little Doll", "Piepentube"), and "Walking with the Beast" (from "Dante's Casino") was re-recorded for "The Dream Spider of the Laughing Horse".

All the studio albums have been released by the Spanish label Siesta Records, in the digipak format with a 16-page colour booklet, "lavishly illustrated" with "exquisite artwork which fits in perfectly with the gothic fantasy"

== Album discography ==
- Strange Letters (1999)
- The Isle of the Blue Flowers (2000)
- Alice in the Underworld (2002)
- The Dream Spider of the Laughing Horse (2004)
- Unreal (live and studio, with musicians from other bands) (2006)
- Black Tulip Wings (2006)
- Gatekeeper (2008)
- Unreal II (live and studio, with musicians from other bands, Red Velvet Records) (2010)
- Society of Figurines (2010)

== Members ==
- Bid – guitar/vocals (The Monochrome Set)
- Alice Healey – vocals
- Jennifer Denitto – drums/vocals (Linus, The Low Edges)
- Peter Momtchiloff – guitar (Talulah Gosh, Heavenly, Would-be-goods)
- Helena Johansson – violin/mandolin
- Deb Van Der Geugten – bass (Linus)
- Sian Chaffer – keyboards/vocals

Previous members included Martin White (The Mystery Fax Machine Orchestra, solo music & comedy), Dickon Edwards (Orlando, Spearmint and Fosca), Kate Dornan (Fosca and The Mystery Fax Machine Orchestra), Toby Robinson and Zarif.
