= YouCaring =

Crowdfunding website

- Website type: Crowdfunding
- Available in: English
- Headquarters: San Francisco, California, US
- Founders: Brock Ketcher, Naomi Ketcher, Luke Miner
- Website: youcaring.com
- Commercial: Yes
- Launched: 2011
- Current status: acquired by Gofundme 2018

YouCaring was a crowdfunding website for personal, medical, and charitable causes. The company was a Certified B corporation based in San Francisco, California. YouCaring did not take a percentage of funds raised on its site, or charge those raising funds a fee (any fees associated with third-party credit card processors such as PayPal are paid by donors). The company relied on voluntary donations from donors to fund operations. YouCaring was acquired by GoFundMe in 2018.

== History ==
YouCaring was founded in 2011 by Brock Ketcher, Naomi Ketcher, and Luke Miner. After returning from two years of international mission trips, the friends wanted to continue to give back. They created a free crowdfunding website so people could raise money to overcome hardship. In May 2016, YouCaring became a Certified B Corporation. YouCaring released internal fundraising data to show which cities in America were (by their own estimation) the most compassionate. In March 2017, YouCaring acquired GiveForward. In April 2018, Fast Company reported that campaigns on YouCaring had raised over $1 billion, when they announced that GoFundMe had agreed to acquire YouCaring.

== Business model ==
YouCaring users created crowdfunding campaigns to raise money for personal, medical, and charitable causes. Nearly 50% of the money raised was for medical expenses. Users wrote an explanation of their needs, set the amount they needed to raise, uploaded supporting photos and video, and shared their fundraisers through social channels and email. Donations were made using credit card processors PayPal, WePay, or Stripe. YouCaring trademarked the name Compassionate Crowdfunding to describe its service. YouCaring didn't charge a fee to those raising funds, but a third-party credit card processing fee existed. Operating costs (including salaries for YouCaring employees) were funded by voluntary donations.

== Fee structure ==
YouCaring asked that the donor provide a "Tip" to YouCaring. The credit card processing fee was 2.9% plus $0.30 per donation, which was paid by the donor.

== Controversy ==
Many journalists have pointed to crowdfunding for medical expenses as evidence for the failings of for-profit healthcare in the US and elsewhere. Some of that criticism has also been extended to crowdfunding sites.

== Notable fundraisers ==
A fundraiser via YouCaring in 2017

- Help Save Matthew! – Aidez-nous à sauver Matthew!. Matthew Schreindorfer was diagnosed with acute lymphoblastic leukemia shortly after his wedding. Matthew and his wife Katie raised $700k so Matthew could participate in a clinical trial.
- The Ridley Sandler Memorial Foundation, Inc. After their daughter's death, Riley's parents started the Riley's Way Foundation to help her joyful spirit and compassionate nature live on. Their community raised $560,000 to honor Riley and help children facing major obstacles reach their full potential.
- Fire Relief, Recovery, and Resiliency Fund for Oakland Fire. Following the tragic Oakland Ghost Ship fire that took 36 lives in December 2016, the Oakland, California nonprofit Gray Area Foundation for the Arts started a fundraiser for a relief fund. The foundation raised $924,820 to support the more than 300 people affected by the tragedy.
- Oakland Fire Relief. The Oakland A's baseball team started a relief fund on YouCaring in response to the Oakland Ghost Ship fire. Together with local sports teams the Golden State Warriors and Oakland Raiders, the A's donated a total of $150,000. Sutter Health also pledged $75,000. The fundraiser raised a total of $555,747.
- Heat for the Sisters. When a 150-year-old convent needed major heating repairs, its nuns turned to crowdfunding. More than 1,500 donors helped raise $160,686 to buy four new boilers, repair the chapel, and fix a leak into their Records and Archive Rooms.
- Restore WA Soldiers Home Cemetery – Orting. A patriotic family decided to help restore the Washington State Soldiers Home Cemetery in Orting. The family raised $254,109 on YouCaring and rallied volunteers to complete the project.
- Help We Are Messengers replace their vehicle. The band We Are Messengers were in a serious car accident that destroyed their vehicle and tour equipment. Band members used crowdfunding to purchase a new tour van and necessary music equipment, raising a total of $77,542.
- Girls who survived Portland's MAX Attack. Three strangers stepped in to defend two young girls from racial slurs on the Portland, OR MAX train. Sadly, two men were killed and the other was wounded for standing up to hate speech. A crowdfunding campaign was created to help the girls heal from this trauma. The surviving defender posted a Facebook Live video that went viral, urging people to support the young girls through the YouCaring fundraiser, which raised $148,675 for basic necessities and mental health services.
- Help Kati defeat Ehlers–Danlos medical expenses! Kati McFarland is a college student who has Ehlers–Danlos Syndrome, Postural Orthostatic Tachycardia, Gastroparesis, and Mast Cell Activation Disorder. She is raising funds to help pay for her extensive medical expenses. McFarland confronted Arkansas senator Tom Cotton about the need for the Affordable Care Act (ACA) at a town hall meeting; her story was picked up on CNN and other news sources.
- #LiveLikeSusie Memorial Fund for Lung Cancer Research. Adam Klein, winner of reality show Survivor: Millennials vs. Gen X, created a fundraiser on YouCaring for lung cancer research to honor his late mother.
- Musical group Doomtree created a YouCaring campaign for rapper P.O.S to help cover the secondary costs associated with a kidney transplant.
- Dickon Edwards, former lead singer of Fosca and guitarist/lyricist for Orlando used the site to help raise money for funeral costs for his brother Tom, guitarist for Adam Ant.
- Science fiction author Jay Lake used the website to pay for whole genome sequencing, towards the "small possibility that the results of such a test...may suggest a treatment path" for his colon cancer, which since 2008 has "progressed from a single tumor to metastatic disease affecting the lung and liver, recurring after multiple surgeries and chemotherapy courses." After his successful campaign, Lake publicly criticized PayPal for the terms and processes the company uses when it thinks there's a fraud risk. His experience was cited in news coverage over PayPal's public promise to introduce "aggressive changes" to its frozen funds policy.
- Houston Flood Relief Fund. Hurricane Harvey severely damaged many homes and personal belongings, and caused large amounts of damage to Texas and Louisiana. This fundraiser is for all of the victims of this storm. As of September 1, 2017, the goal has been raised multiple times after surpassing each prior one, and is currently at $20,000,000. Many celebrities and organizations have partaken in this campaign, such as Drake, Ellen DeGeneres and Walmart, and the Tennessee Titans.
- YoXMéxico. 2017 Central Mexico earthquake struck at 13:14 CDT (18:14 UTC) on 19 September 2017 with a magnitude estimated to be Mw 7.1 and strong shaking for about 20 seconds. This fundraiser is for all of the victims of this earthquake and was initiated by Mexican soccer players Javier Hernández and Miguel Layún.
- A number of publications have implored donations to YouCaring to celebrate Giving Tuesday.
