= Saint Christopher in popular culture =

Saint Christopher, a 3rd-century Christian considered a saint across several Christian denominations, has been adapted to a number of settings in popular culture.

== Saint Christopher personifications, apparitions ==
=== Literature ===
- Saint Christopher was a play performed in 1609 in Yorkshire by Lord Cholmeley's Men which resulted in the group's trial in the Court of Star Chamber.
- Saint Christopher (novel) is a novella set in the Middle Ages written in the 1890s by the Portuguese writer José Maria de Eça de Queirós.
- Saint Christopher is the patron saint of the Saltee Islands in Airman, a 2008 book by Eoin Colfer.
- In James McKenzie's novel Janis and Saint Christopher, Saint Christopher safely guides French explorers to the Australian mainland and becomes the patron saint of the city of Saint Christopher.

=== Film ===
- In Robert Altman's 1978 science fiction film Quintet, a Latin-speaking gambler named Saint Christopher rules over a future ice-age city.
- In the 1996 World War II film The Ogre a recurring theme is the comparison of the main character, Abel, nicknamed "The Ogre", with a demoted saint, Saint Christopher. It begins with Abel praying to Saint Christopher to burn down his school. In the final scene, Abel rescues a boy from the Nazis by carrying him across a swamp.
- In the 1980 film The Ninth Configuration (also known as Twinkle, Twinkle, "Killer" Kane) based on the American novel written by William Peter Blatty, a Saint Christopher's medal serves as a primary plot device when the protagonist Cutshaw finds the St. Christopher's medal he gave to a soldier and believes it is a sign of life after death.
- In the 2019 Netflix series The Order, some main characters are members of a werewolf clan called: “The Knights of Saint Christopher.”
- In the 2007 film Gone Baby Gone a missing Catholic child is noted to wear a medallion depicting Saint Christopher, referred to as "The Medallion of Saint Christopher". When the child's killer is identified, the killer is wearing it.

=== Music ===
- In the second verse of the song The Risen Lord from his 1988 album Flying Colours, singer Chris De Burgh sings a version of Saint Christopher's meeting with the Christ child at the river.
- Dennis DeYoung of the rock band Styx wrote the song "Christopher, Mr. Christopher" for Styx's 1974 album Man of Miracles.
- Tom Waits wrote the song "Hang on St. Christopher", released on the album Franks Wild Years in 1987, in which he implores Saint Christopher to watch over him as he pushes his hot-rod cars and motorcycles to their limits. Waits also mentions him on "Tom Traubert's Blues."
- The band Fosca released a song entitled "Letter to Saint Christopher" on their 2002 album Diary of an Antibody. In it, the protagonist asks Saint Christopher if he will "ever reach point B", using the story of Christopher and the young child's journey across the river as a metaphor for moving on from an unhappy life.
- The New Jersey hard rock band Saraya on their 1989 self-titled debut album had the track St.Christopher Medal. Declaring a young persons concern of whom was there now to protect them through their travels now that St.Christopher was no longer a Saint.
- The chorus of the song Zed and Two Naughts by The Mars Volta references Saint Christopher.
- The artist Frank Turner wrote the song "St Christopher is Coming Home", released on his album Love, Ire, and Song in 2009.
- Terri Hendrix's title track of The Spiritual Kind album describes St. Christopher in a verse, noting that while his sainthood is seemingly in dispute, he is still a "guide for the spiritual kind".
- Saint Christopher is mentioned in the song 'Minor Character' by Lloyd Cole (& The Commotions) on his album 'Easy Pieces'. (Saint Christopher Sunday / Otherwise uneventful).
- Saint Christopher is the subject of the song 'Meu Glorioso São Cristovão' by Jorge Ben and Gilberto Gil on their album 'Gil e Jorge'.
- Saint Christopher is the name of a single and studio album by Peter Capaldi from Doctor Who.

== Saint Christopher medals and likenesses ==
=== Literature ===
- In Truman Capote's novella Breakfast at Tiffany's, the narrator gives Holly Golightly a St. Christopher's medal for Christmas, "[b]ut at least it came from Tiffany's."
- In Stephen King's novel The Green Mile, the protagonist John Coffey, a giant African-American with healing ability, is given a Saint Christopher medal after healing a woman. This scene was included within the 1999 film adaptation of the book.
- In Geoffrey Chaucer's The Canterbury Tales, in the General Prologue, the Knight's Yeoman is described as wearing "A Cristopher on his breast of silver sheen."
- In Barbara Kingsolver's first novel, The Bean Trees, a Guatemalan refugee, Esperanza, wears a Saint Christopher pendant and calls him the patron saint of refugees. She later gives the pendant to a three-year-old orphaned girl named Turtle.
- In the third Nikki Heat novel, Heat Rises, Jameson Rook wears a St. Christopher medal that he is given by Faustino Velez Arango when he finds Nikki near the end.
- In Ken Kesey's novel Sometimes a Great Notion, a scene depicts Indian Jenny searching for a misplaced St. Christopher medal.

=== Film ===
- In the 1957 movie The Spirit of St. Louis, (1957), Charles Lindbergh (played by James Stewart) is given a St. Christopher medal before his big flight, which he refuses to accept in order to save every unnecessary ounce of weight. His friend instead hides the medal in the aircraft, to make sure that the saint would be with him for the long and dangerous trip.
- In the 1974 movie Murder on the Orient Express, the Swedish missionary Greta Ohlsson (Ingrid Bergman) wears a Saint Christopher medallion, the apparent loss of which causes her to panic before boarding the train in Istanbul, although she finds it shortly afterward.
- In the 1978, film, The Ninth Configuration, written and directed by William Peter Blatty, who also wrote The Exorcist, a Saint Christopher Medal figures prominently in the plot.
- In the 1983 movie The Outsiders, the character Dallas Winston is seen wearing a St. Christopher necklace.
- In the 1993 movie Kalifornia, Brad Pitt's character Early Grayce sticks a small statue of Saint Christopher on the dash of the car in one scene and tells David Duchovny's character Brian Kessler "Just in case".
- In 2003's The Magdalene Sisters, Crispina and her sister both own St. Christopher medals
- In the 2004 film The Machinist, Trevor Reznik (Christian Bale) is often shown wearing a St. Christopher medal.
- In the 2003 movie Cowboys & Angels, Shane Butler (Michael Legge) is given a Saint Christopher pendant by his mother just before leaving his parents’ home for the first time. He later gives the pendant to his friend, Vincent.
- In the 2003 film Seabiscuit, Marcela (Elizabeth Banks) hands Red (Tobey Maguire) a pendant of St. Christopher before Seabiscuit's final race at Santa Anita for good luck.
- In the 2004 movie Crash, Peter Waters (Larenz Tate) carries around a pocket sized statue of Saint Christopher. Waters hitches a ride from police officer Tom Hansen (played by Ryan Phillippe) who has the same statue figure on his dashboard. When Hansen laughs at the thought that Waters has one too, and Waters reaches to pull his statue from his pocket, the cop suspects a gun and shoots him. When Hansen approaches the dead man's body, he discovers the statue in his hand, not a gun.
- In the 2004 movie The Butterfly Effect, the story's main character, Evan Treborn (Ashton Kutcher) is seen wearing a Saint Christopher pendant throughout the entire movie in each stage of his life.
- In the movie Airplane!, a St. Christopher statue sits on top of the glare shield in the cockpit, and hides its face as the situation aboard the aircraft deteriorates.
- In the Joss Whedon's 2005 film Serenity, Jayne Cobb (Adam Baldwin) takes a St. Christopher medal off a dead security guard and wears it for the rest of the film.
- In the 2006 film The Wind that shakes the barley, Sinéad gives Damian her brother Michaels St Christopher Medal after he was executed by the Black and Tans. Damian returns the Medal to Sinéad with his final letter to her the night before he is executed.
- In the 2009 film, Bunny and the Bull, Eloisa, a Spanish waitress who believes in superstitions, panics when she believes her St. Christopher medallion has been stolen and is scared to travel without it.
- In the 2010 movie, The Book of Eli, Eli (Denzel Washington) wears a Saint Christopher pendant on a chain.
- In the 2013 film Gravity, Dr. Ryan Stone (Sandra Bullock) sees an icon in an evacuated Russian space station depicting Saint Christopher carrying the Christ-child on his shoulder across a river. The plot turns at this point with a paranormal event inspiring Dr. Stone to shake off despair and through a form of prayer, courage, and ingenuity find a way to escape.
- In the 2013 movie Red 2, Dr. Bailey (Anthony Hopkins) is looking for his Saint Christopher medal in his cell in the insane asylum while Frank Moses (Bruce Willis), Sarah Ross (Mary-Louise Parker), and Marvin Boggs (John Malkovich) are trying to enlist his help.
- In the 2016 film, The Shallows, Nancy Adams (Blake Lively) is shown wearing a Saint Christopher necklace throughout the movie.
- In the 2024 film, Madame Web, the titular character (Dakota Johnson) is shown wearing a Saint Christopher necklace throughout the movie, having been passed down to her from her late mother, Constance Webb (Kerry Bishé)

=== Television ===
- In the TV series Fear the Walking Dead (2020, Season 6, Episode 2), Daniel gives Strand a medallion of Saint Christopher, telling him it helps people to bear heavy burdens, and that Strand needs it more than he does. Strand later gives the medallion to Alicia, and it appears several more times throughout the series.
- In the TV series The Boys (2020, season 2, Episode 8), Bill Butcher gives Ryan a medal of Saint Christopher claiming it belonged to Becca, Ryan's mother and Butcher's wife, and that it should protect him.
- In the TV series Bones (season 4, episode 24), Agent Seeley Booth gives his brother Jared, who wants to travel in India by motorbike, a pendant of Saint Christopher.
- In the TV series Life on Mars DCI Sam Tyler John Simm is seen wearing a pendant of St. Christopher throughout the series.
- In the Netflix TV series Dark, a St. Christopher pendant is a recurring object.
- In the first chapter of Lost in Space (2018), Dr. Zoe Smith found her St. Christopher necklace near the crashed spaceship.
- In the TV series You Candace's necklace is a St Christopher medallion.
- In the Netflix TV series The Order, one of the university's secret societies is called, "The Knights of Saint Christopher."

=== Celebrity ===
- During the Beatles’ visit to New York City in August 1964, a fan named Angie McGowan grabbed a St. Christopher's medal from the neck of drummer Ringo Starr. McGowan later returned the medal in a much-publicized event.
- NASCAR champion Alan Kulwicki, a Roman Catholic, always raced with a St. Christopher devotional medal in his car.
- One Direction singer Harry Styles famously wore a St. Christopher medallion while touring. He gave it to a young girl in Ghana named Fridous during One Direction's trip for Red Nose Day
- Isabel Jeans, a British actress in many films, including Gigi, chose an SC Medal as her luxury on an island whilst interviewed in 1953 on the BBC "Desert Island Discs" show, broadcast on 24 April 1953.

=== Other ===
- The motorcycle apparel company Icon Motosports has been sewing a St. Christopher medallion into a hidden pouch in the breast pocket of their jackets since 2005.
- The German car manufacturer Porsche published its inaugural issue of Christophorus magazine, one of the oldest customer publications, in July 1952.
