= Didn't I Break My Heart Over You =

2000 single by Rachel Stamp

Single by Rachel Stamp

from the album "Hymns For Strange Children"
- B-side: "Black Tambourine", "Carmelita"
- Released: February 7, 2000 (UK)
- Genre: Alternative rock, glam rock
- Length: 9:43
- Label: Cruisin' Records
- Songwriter(s): Rachel Stamp, Warren Zevon
- Producer(s): John Fryer

Rachel Stamp singles chronology
"Spank" (1999)	"Didn't I Break My Heart Over You" (2000)	"Hey Hey Michael You're Really Fantastic... Live!" (2000)

Vinyl cover

"Didn't I Break My Heart Over You" is a single by London glam rock band, Rachel Stamp. This single was the band's second release via the Cruisin' Records label, and reached Number Three on the NME Independent Singles Chart in February, 2000. The single was released on two formats (CD single and a limited edition 7" vinyl) two weeks prior to the release of the "Hymns For Strange Children" album and featured two songs left over from the album recording sessions - "Black Tambourine" (a live favourite) and a cover of the Warren Zevon song, "Carmelita". There was no promotional video made to promote this release.

== CD single ==
Released February 7, 2000
(CR RS 002)

=== Track listing ===
1. Didn't I Break My Heart Over You (single edit)
2. Black Tambourine
3. Carmelita

=== Facts ===
- The single was released as a CD single and limited edition 7" vinyl of 500 copies.
- "Didn't I Break My Heart Over You" was originally recorded for the unreleased WEA album, "Fight the Force of Evil". The song was re-recorded for the "Hymns For Strange Children" album and edited for release as a single.
- "Black Tambourine" is included on the "Now I'm Nailed To Your Bedroom Wall, I've Only Got Myself To Blame" compilation and the live album, "Stampax" (which features a live performance of the song recorded during the band's 21 date "Hymns For Strange Children Tour" of the UK)
- "Carmelita" is a cover of a Warren Zevon song. This recording was later included on the tribute album, "Hurry Home Early: The Songs of Warren Zevon" in 2005 (released through Wampus Media)
- Talking about the recording to Wampus Media in 2005, Will Crewdson discussed the band's decision for covering the song:

"This was one of the fastest and most relaxing recording sessions we've ever done. We're longtime admirers of the incomparable Mr. Zevon's way with a song and hopefully we caught some of the magical vibe of the original in our own style. Notice our Ronstadt-esque placing of the verses -- although I did read that it was Warren's original intention to have them in this order -- it's a tribute to everyone!"
