= Monsters of the New Wave =

Single by Rachel Stamp

Single by Rachel Stamp

from the album "Hymns For Strange Children"
- B-side: "Black Cherry" (Live); "Please Don't Touch" (Live)
- Released: 2 October 2000 (UK)
- Genre: Alternative rock, glam rock
- Length: 9:34
- Label: Cruisin'
- Songwriter(s): 1, 2: Rachel Stamp; 3: Heath/Robinson
- Producer(s): 1: John Fryer

Rachel Stamp singles chronology
"Hey Hey Michael You're Really Fantastic... Live!" (2000)	"Monsters of the New Wave" (2000)	"Black Cherry" (2002)

"Monsters of the New Wave 7" Single"

Single by Rachel Stamp

"Monsters of the New Wave (Swedish release)"

Single by Rachel Stamp

from the album "Hymns For Strange Children"
- B-side: "I Got The Worm" (live), "Spank" (live)
- Released: June 2000 (Sweden)
- Length: 9:08
- Label: Raw Power Records
- Songwriter(s): Rachel Stamp
- Producer(s): John Fryer, Max Bisgrove & Rachel Stamp

"Monsters of the New Wave" is a single by London glam rock band, Rachel Stamp. This single was the band's final single release via the Cruisin' Records label and received the Single of the Week in Kerrang! magazine, October 2000. The single was released on two formats (CD single and a limited edition 7" vinyl) and a promotional video for the single was filmed by Paul Harries. The single was also released across Europe through Raw Power Records with a different track listing and artwork.

== UK CD Single & 7" Vinyl ==
Released October 2, 2000
(CR RS 005)

=== Track listing ===
1. Monsters of the New Wave
2. Black Cherry (live)
3. Please Don't Touch (live)

=== Facts ===
- "Monsters of the New Wave" was released as a CD single and limited edition 7" vinyl of 500 copies.
- The artwork for the CD single was by Michael Corran. The artwork was inspired by a Sweet album.
- The single features two tracks left over from the "Stampax" live album - an early live version of "Black Cherry" and a cover of the Johnny Kidd and the Pirates song, "Please Don't Touch". These songs were recorded on the "Hymns for Strange Children Tour" of the UK, early 2000.
- "Monsters of the New Wave" was the last single the band released through Cruisin' Records. The song can also be found on the "Now I'm Nailed To Your Bedroom Wall, I've Only Got Myself To Blame" compilation.

== European CD single ==
Released June 2000
(RP-010)

=== Track listing ===
1. Monsters of the New Wave
2. I Got The Worm (live)
3. Spank (live)

=== Facts ===
- Released via Raw Power Records across Europe to coincide with a European Tour in support of "Hymns for Strange Children".
- The single was deleted after the tour and was only released on CD
- Features the same B-sides as the "Hey Hey Michael You're Really Fantastic... Live!" CD single
- Artwork by Matt Abenny

== Promotional video ==
- A promotional video for the single was directed by Paul Harries.
- David Ryder-Prangley: "directed by PAUL HARRIES. i like this one - us in a white studio at the height of ultra cartoon phase of the band. apparently picked out by MARILYN MANSON on some tv show as a favourite although i'm not sure what the exact story is... line up as above with also shaheena..." (taken from a fan site interview, 2004)
