= David Ryder Prangley =

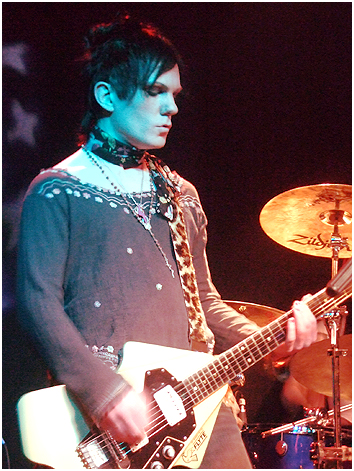

Background information
- Born: David Ryder Prangley
- Origin: Dinas Powys, Wales
- Genres: Electronica, new wave, rock
- Occupation: Musician
- Instruments: Guitar, bass guitar, vocalist
- Years active: 1982–present
- Formerly of: Sister Witch

David Ryder Prangley is a Welsh musician best known for his work with the glam punk band Rachel Stamp, and as bass player for Adam Ant.

== Biography ==
Born in Dinas Powys, Wales, Ryder Prangley started his music career aged nine years old as a member of Welsh language boy-band Bechgyn Sêren (often referred to as the 'Welsh Menudo'). At 13, Ryder Prangley took up guitar and toured and recorded with Rock Bottom (alongside the future Games Workshop and Blizzard Entertainment artist/designer Mark Gibbons) before taking up singing and forming Rockets (later Hollyweird). After limited local success in the Cardiff area including an appearance on ITV's Welsh music showcase Rough Mix, Ryder Prangley moved to London in 1994 and formed Rachel Stamp (as lead singer and bassist) with guitarist Will Crewdson.

Having signed a publishing deal with David A. Stewart's Anxious Music on the strength of a demo tape produced by Thighpaulsandra, Rachel Stamp signed a recording contract with WEA after playing only four gigs but the liaison was cut short when the band's A&R man Clive Black (who signed the group) left the label. The album recorded for WEA ('Rachel Stamp Fight The Force of Evil') remains unreleased. However, after the addition of Robin Guy and Shaheena Dax to the band, Rachel Stamp achieved commercial and critical success in the UK with three independently released albums (Hymns For Strange Children, Stampax and Oceans of Venus) reaching the UK Independent Chart top ten. During this time, Ryder Prangley was known for his androgynous appearance and fashion sense. Melody Maker called him 'the most beautiful frontman since David Sylvian' After a 2003 tour of the US supporting Pigface, and a final single "Honey" / "Queen of the Universe", Rachel Stamp went on hiatus before reforming in 2009 for a sell out show at London's Islington Academy in support of the Serena/Cargo release Now I'm Nailed To Your Bedroom Wall, I've Only Got Myself To Blame – The Best of Rachel Stamp.

In 2005, Ryder Prangley formed David Ryder Prangley and the Witches (as lead singer and guitarist) with a revolving group of musicians. The band played several concerts but never recorded (a conscious decision by Ryder Prangley to 'eliminate any commercial expectations'). During this time Ryder Prangley acted in the pilot for the comedy movie Big FM, playing the part of a Welsh glam rock DJ and also moved into music production, producing the first two singles by My Passion ("Bitter Too" and "Hot in the Doll's House"), the first single "Diamonds" by Lilygun, the double A-side single "Straight To Video" / "Marlborough Road" for Jonny Cola & the A-Grades, amongst others. He was also a member of Paul St Paul and the Apostles led by Paul St Paul, alias Xavior Roide (previously frontman of the Romo band DexDexTer) who had supported the Witches on tour in 2005 as a solo vocal/piano act. He also became involved in London's East End cabaret scene, regularly performing at Hanky Panky Cabaret where he invented the 'sans bouche' mime style after being drafted into a production of The Importance of Being Earnest at the last minute and not having time to learn the lines. From 2008 to 2010, Ryder Prangley toured as bass guitarist with former Bay City Rollers guitarist Eric Faulkner. He has also performed as bass guitarist with Adam Ant, LIVAN, Angie Bowie and Peter Murphy.

Ryder Prangley has directed music videos for former Flesh For Lulu singer Nick Marsh's A Universe Between Us album, and music videos for Lilygun, Liza Bec and Laurie Black. He wrote and recorded music for the short film Annabelle's Tea Party and collaborated on a comic book (Vampire Deluxe) with New York artist Lawrence Gullo. In April 2012, he produced the second EP by London art rock band, Partly Faithful, called The Beehive. The EP featured vocals from former Screaming Banshee Aircrew frontman Ed Banshee and Savages guitarist Gemma Thompson.

From 2014 to 2015, Ryder Prangley performed with the band T. Rextasy as bass guitarist and continued production work with Alberteen, John E. Vistic, Alexa De Strange and Bordello Rose. On 16 January 2015, he released "David Ryder Prangley's Birthday Suite", a three song medley that was recorded, mixed and released in an eight-hour period as a limited edition download, available for only 48 hours. In 2015, he formed the band Sister Witch with vocalist Lux Lyall. Their debut album 7 was released on 7 July 2016. He also co-wrote and played guitar on Lux Lyall's debut album Vamp, released on 24 August 2020.

On 14 February 2020, he released his first solo album, Black Magic & True Love which was described by Prog magazine as 'sassy, shimmy-hipped, yet sophisticated: elegant escapism'. A follow-up album Vampire Deluxe was released on 4 July 2021. In August 2021, he worked again with Adam Ant as COVID-19 isolation cover for Ant's regular bassist Joe Holweger.

Preceded by Bruce Witkin	Adam Ant bassist 2010	Succeeded by Tom Edwards
