= Will Crewdson =

British musician

- Origin: London
- Genres: Rock, electronic, new wave
- Occupation: Musician
- Instrument: Guitar

Will Crewdson is a London-based guitarist, writer, and producer best known for his work with the following bands and artists: Rachel Stamp, Adam Ant, The Selecter, Flesh for Lulu, Bow Wow Wow, Gaye Bykers on Acid, Tom Jones, She Made Me Do It, Sigue Sigue Sputnik, Celine Dion, Appleton (music duo) and Johnette Napolitano. He also records and performs solo under the moniker Scant Regard.

== Career ==
=== Rachel Stamp ===
Crewdson spent 10 years touring and recording with the rock band Rachel Stamp, who, at one point, became the only unsigned band to sell out the London Astoria. They also played gigs with Iggy Pop, Korn, No Doubt, The Tubes and Cheap Trick and toured the USA extensively in 2003 with the industrial supergroup Pigface.

The band was formed in London in 1994 by Crewdson and singer/bassist David Ryder Prangley. They had several record deals, the biggest of which was with WEA.

Rachel Stamp reformed in 2009 and have continued to play live since then.

=== Collaboration with Johnette Napolitano ===
In 2005 Crewdson concentrated on writing and recording with Johnette Napolitano, the former singer with LA legends Concrete Blonde. The critically acclaimed Napolitano solo album Scarred was released on Hybrid Recordings in 2007. The majority of the songs were co-written and produced by Will who also provided bass, keyboards and programming to the tracks.

After this he collaborated with the US director/writer Tom DiCillo as one half of The Black and Blue Orkestre.

=== Adam Ant guitarist ===
In 2010, Crewdson played live, recorded and musically directed for Adam Ant's solo band. Gigs included a sell-out show at London's Scala. He also helped organize a tribute to the late Adam and the Ants guitarist, Matthew Ashman again at the London Scala on 21 November 2010. Crewdson played lead guitar on the night with the remaining members of Ashman's bands, Bow Wow Wow and Chiefs of Relief (featuring Paul Cook from Sex Pistols on drums and Billy Morrison on vocals) as well as performing another set with Adam Ant.

=== Other collaborations and live work ===
He then worked with Greek singer LIVAN touring and writing with him. Live work with this artist included opening for Alice Cooper, Aerosmith, New Model Army and Peter Murphy.

As well as these projects, Crewdson has also played guitar for the following: Bow Wow Wow, Malcolm McLaren, Tom Jones, Bryan Ferry, Martin Degville, Celine Dion, Appleton, Pigface, Tyler James, T-Rexstasy and Dragons.

=== Flesh for Lulu ===
In 2013, Nick Marsh announced that he was forming a new line-up of Flesh for Lulu which included Crewdson on guitar. Flesh played in the UK and Spain with this lineup right up to Marsh’s death from cancer in 2015. They also did a full UK tour supporting Goo Goo Dolls.

=== Rejoining Adam Ant ===
Crewdson rejoined Adam Ant in early 2014 as joint lead guitarist for his UK live shows which included a one-off Hammersmith Apollo gig. Ant's classic Dirk Wears White Sox album was played in its entirety at this show, which was later released as the concert DVD Dirk Live at the Apollo. He was also featured in Jack Bond's full-length documentary about Ant, The Blueblack Hussar which was released on DVD in July 2014. Crewdson was sole guitarist for Ant following the sudden death of bandmate Tom Edwards during a US tour in January 2017 until the recruitment of replacement Adam Leach later that year.

He has toured extensively throughout the UK and USA with Adam and continues to do so to this day.

=== The Selecter ===
In 2015, Crewdson joined The Selecter on guitar. He toured the world with them for 5 years and provided guitar on their 2017 Daylight (The Selecter album) album.

=== Gaye Bykers on Acid ===
In August 2023 Will started playing with Gaye Bykers on Acid commencing with a high profile set at Rebellion Festival. For these gigs he goes under the pseudonym Billy Boy Byker.

=== Scant Regard ===
Crewdson has released eight solo albums under the name Scant Regard. This is mainly instrumental electronic-led guitar-driven music taking in influences from punk, techno, dub, surf style rock'n'roll and Spaghetti Western soundtracks sometimes featuring guest vocalists including Pauline Black, Mary Byker and Maggie K De Monde from Scarlet Fantastic.

He also provided the recurring intro and outro theme music for Richard Herring’s award winning RHLSTP podcast.

Scant Regard’s one man show has been seen live in the UK, USA, Europe and Australia. He has also supported bands such as EMF, Jesus Jones, Spear of Destiny (band) and Electric Six.

=== She Made Me Do It ===
2015 saw him release his first album with electronic rock band She Made Me Do It, which features Shaheena Dax from Rachel Stamp on vocals and bass. They are still releasing new albums and EPs as well as playing live, supporting such bands as Goodbye Mr Mackenzie, Balaam and the Angel and The Chameleons.

=== Reverend Guitars ===
Crewdson is endorsed by Reverend Guitars.

Preceded by Marco Pirroni	Adam Ant lead guitarist 2010	Succeeded by Tom Edwards
Preceded by Tom Edwards	Adam Ant lead guitarist 2014 – '17; With: Tom Edwards	Succeeded by Himself and Adam Leach
Preceded by Himself and Tom Edwards	Adam Ant lead guitarist 2017 - present With: Adam Leach	Incumbent
