= Romo =

1990s music movement

- Other names: Romantic Modernism
- Stylistic origins: New Romantic; glam rock; dance-pop; disco; hi-NRG; contemporary R&B; Motown; synthpop
- Cultural origins: Mid-1990s, United Kingdom

Other topics
- Britpop; new wave of new wave; indie music

Romo (also known as Romantic Modernism) was a musical and nightclubbing movement, of glam/style pop lineage, in the UK circa 1995–1997, centred on the twin homes of Camden-based clubnight Club Skinny and its West End clone Arcadia, as well as concerts by the chief associated bands.

The Romo movement was essentially a derivation of late-1970s disco and early-1980s club music, with an emphasis on the extroverted sartorial style and decadent air of New Romantic-era bands such as Japan and Soft Cell. Nonetheless, contemporary features in Melody Maker (where the genre was championed mainly by Simon Price and Taylor Parkes – it was dismissed by the rival NME) tended to downplay the nostalgic connection with New Romantic, emphasising Romo's innovation and contemporary relevance.

Much championed by the said writers at the Melody Maker as a stylish and poppy backlash against the dressed-down style and raw jangly sound of the Britpop movement, while variously fêted and lambasted by others in the media as a New Romantic revival (a tag rejected by those on the scene), Romo's legacy has been chiefly in club culture as it heralded a new generation of glam/ style-orientated club nights which would continue through the 2000s.

== History ==
=== Birth of Romo ===
Club Skinny was created in spring 1995 by promoters Kevin Wilde and Paul "HiFi" Nugent as a club playing stylish 1980s pop as an antidote to the fashion for indie-derived Britpop. The club was originally located at Camden's Laurel Tree venue, then the home of top Britpop clubnight Blow Up. Wilde and Nugent regarded it as a subversive and "punk" act to host their glamorous pop night at a major epicentre of the indie/Britpop movement they were opposing. Although initially forced to make the compromise of including concerts by upcoming Britpop bands in order to attract punters, the club gained momentum after members of Persecution Complex, a female David Bowie-influenced band noted for their flamboyant dress sense, became regulars at the club, attracting a flow of further flamboyant club-goers in their wake.

A further development was the recruitment of two glamorous 1980s-styled bands Plastic Fantastic and DexDexTer. The former was a Brighton-based Roxy Music/Japan-influenced outfit fronted by former Scorpio Rising/Supercharger frontman Stuart Miller with bassist John Gold and German brothers Conrad and Shadric Toop on guitars/keyboards interchangeably. The latter were initially known as MkII featuring Basques Even and Gage on keyboards and bass, guitarist Gjeih and Irish singer Xav aka Xavior (born Paul Wilkinson, also formerly known as Paul Roide) a future Placebo keyboardist. The two Basques had been making synth-based music in Spain for several years before relocating to England and recruiting Xav and Gjeih. The two bands were duly scheduled to double-headline the 17 August edition of Club Skinny.

In addition, one of the aspiring Britpop bands who had been playing at the club, Viva, led by Derek 'Del' Gray, were inspired by the club to reinvent themselves as a pure pop/disco outfit in the same vein as ABC circa The Lexicon of Love. Wilde would subsequently become the manager of both Viva and DexDexTer.

=== Discovery by Simon Price of Melody Maker ===
Melody Maker writer Simon Price was already alert to the existence of Plastic Fantastic and had previously linked them, together with Sexus, a Manchester-based "intelligent handbag" duo consisting of singer David Savage and keyboard player Paul Southern (together formerly indie guitar duo Sanity Plexus) and a non-glamorous electronic act called Boutique, as "New Romo" [sic] in a June 1995 review for Sexus's debut single "Edenites". His colleague Everett True also heavily used the term Romo for a Plastic Fantastic review that summer.

Price was invited to the aforementioned double bill edition of Club Skinny. With the event judged a success by the audience, musicians, promoters and Price himself, he not only began to cover the scene enthusiastically in his writing, converting his colleague Taylor Parkes along the way, but also, together with Toby Slater, opened up a second clubnight for the scene in Soho, named Arcadia. This was based at L'Equippe Anglais in Duke Street but later moved to legendary Soho drag bar Madame Jojo's.

Club Skinny meanwhile also relocated to HQ's (now known as Lockside), a venue in Camden Lock Market close to Dingwalls, starting with the club's 31 August 1995 edition. A Plastic Fantastic/ Viva/ DexDexTer triple bill at the venue on 28 September 1995 was reviewed by Parkes in memorable fashion:

There must be 350 people in here at least. Satin, snakeskin, PVC, epaullettes, peroxide, a certain seriousness in the eyes, a certain determination about the lips.

By this time, more acts were emerging from the scene. Orlando who had played live as an indie band in 1993-1994 before withdrawing to reinvent themselves as an "alienated" white soul duo consisting of singer Tim Chipping, guitarist/lyricist Dickon Edwards and some sidemen, approached Club Skinny to relaunch themselves as a live act. Punk trio Xerox Girls likewise reinvented themselves as a glacial synth/electro duo Hollywood consisting of singer Hannah Edgren and keyboardist Stacey Leigh, with third member David Gray (Leigh's then-boyfriend) retained as a synthesiser programmer. Gray would later become Orlando's live drummer while Nugent would take over the management of both bands.

=== Mainstream media attention ===
The scene began to achieve mainstream media coverage with a feature on Arcadia in Katie Puckrick's Sunday Show featuring live footage of Plastic Fantastic and Sexus (by now a full part of the Romo scene) and interviews with the two aforementioned bands, Xavior from DexDexTer and Simon Price, and queue/crowd/dancefloor footage of Arcadia featuring Wilde, Grey, Chipping, Edwards, Edgren and Leigh. By the end of 1995, media coverage of Romo had included TV coverage on ITV, Sky News and an unspecified Japanese TV news programme, radio coverage on BBC Radio 1 and BBC World Service and print media coverage in Time Out, The Observer, The Guardian, The Sunday Times, as well as colour features in style magazines The Face and i-D. Tabloid newspaper the Daily Star also printed an enthusiastic but largely inaccurate full page article depicting the scene as a straightforward New Romantic revival.

Melody Maker meanwhile continued its enthusiastic coverage, culminating in a cover-featured Romo special defining the scene. The cover image was a group shot of Chipping, Miller, Savage and Xavior clad in their Romo finery, while the feature identified seven core bands – the aforementioned Orlando, Plastic Fantastic, DexDexTer, Sexus, Hollywood, Viva, and linking in one non-scene band Minty, the former musical project of the late Leigh Bowery being continued after his death by his widow Nicola and various artistic friends, most notably singer Matthew Glammore and guitarist Richard Torry.

More significant was the inclusion of a "Romanifesto" by Price and Parkes which ideologically defined Romo as the rejection of authenticity in music in favour of creative artifice, a militant pop sensibility (which placed Romo in direct opposition to both rockism and the values of alternative music) and the ideal of recreating/reinventing oneself as a glamorous Star-type persona.

=== Melody Maker cassette and package tour ===
The 9 March 1996 edition of Melody Maker gave away a compilation cassette of Romo bands entitled Fiddling While Romo Burns. Five bands featured on the tape – DexDexTer, Hollywood, Plastic Fantastic, Viva (whose track Now was co-produced by Marc Almond and Neal X) and Orlando – Sexus and Minty having by now decided to keep their distance from the scene. Despite Minty's non-involvement in the tape, its individual members and collaborators contributed to the continuing flow of fresh Romo acts such as Elizabeth Bunny and Massive Ego, the latter featuring a young Dan Black on guitar.

Other newcomers to the scene were Universe (a similar "perfect pop" concept to Viva) and Acacia (an earlier incarnation of which featured future Mercury Music prize winner Talvin Singh.) German pop act Sin With Sebastian also played Arcadia during this time. Romo club culture also continued to develop with the launch by Price and Gray of Saturday night clubnight Paris 6 am at Oscars nightclub in Leicester Square as well as two clubs organised by other parties – The Cell at Gossips in Dean Street promoted by Stewart Ubik and the Roxy Motel Club at The Fridge in Brixton.

The climax of all this activity was a package tour of Romo bands, also entitled "Fiddling While Romo Burns", featuring a quadruple bill of Orlando, Plastic Fantastic, Hollywood and DexDexTer (with live drummer Laura "Elle" Schellino). Although the showcase London concert (also featuring Viva) at the LA2 venue was a 750 capacity sellout and reasonable crowds were also attracted to the Brighton and Manchester shows, other provincial dates on the tour – mostly at student venues that were the fodder of the very indie music that the militantly pop Romo movement opposed – failed to attract large audiences and those that did attend were generally sceptical.

More seriously, the strain of having to live, eat and sleep together rather than merely go nightclubbing together had severely strained relations between the bands. Chipping was relatively diplomatic about this in one interview at the time: "There's a definite reason why we have two tourbuses. It's to do with the fact that some bands just won't tour with each other, not because they dislike each other, they just have different... living styles."

Nevertheless, by the end of the tour, all of the seven core acts originally featured in the Melody Maker special had recording contracts with either major or big independent labels – Orlando with WEA subsidiary Blanco y Negro Records, Plastic Fantastic with Mercury Records, Sexus with ZTT, Hollywood with U2's Mother Records label, DexDexTer with Island Records subdivision Trade2, Viva with Planet3 Records and Minty (whose transvestite drummer Trevor Sharpe had filled in as drummer for Plastic Fantastic on the tour) with Candy Records.

=== Later period ===
After the tour, Price wrote an editorial in Melody Maker declaring the movement dead as it had achieved its aims but was now being soured by the revivalist portrayal in the mainstream media. Despite this, the scene in London continued with more bands emerging such as Anglo-Japanese female quartet Étoile as well as the arrival in Britain of Donovan Leitch's band Nancy Boy.

Another late major addition to the scene at around this time was Belvedere Kane, fronted by Romo scene face Barry Stone, later of the Jewels And Stone writing/production partnership. Belvedere Kane would later release a single "Never Felt As Good" which reached #86 on the charts and would later be covered by Massive Ego on their 2007 debut album Nite Klub Skewl. They also recorded an album Such Trying Times which was eventually released in 2026. In his review of Belvedere Kane's gig, Price recanted his "Romo is dead" declaration, dismissing it as a red herring tactic and further adding that the continued spread of Romo was by now beyond even his control. At around this time, a first anniversary party was held for Club Skinny headlined by Crush, the band of former Byker Grove TV stars Donna Air and Jayni Hoy.

However in July 1996, feeling that their clubnights were being soured by continued tensions in the scene, Nugent, Wilde, Price and Slater discontinued both Club Skinny and Arcadia. Romo activities continued at the individual bands' concerts, although one Plastic Fantastic concert at Dingwalls from this time ended in a mass brawl after a hat was thrown onstage. The band also had a residency at the Dublin Castle, Camden during this period, although this was terminated by management after an incident where stage invaders performed a sex show.

The bands mostly concentrated on their recording contracts at this point – in late 1996 Hollywood released a heavily remixed single "Apocalypse Kiss" and both Edgren and Leigh participated in performance art side project "Anti-Marilyn." Edgren was spotted (by Dickon Edwards) fronting a new band in 1998 and she and Leigh would later reunite as Fubar. Plastic Fantastic – having previously released the Eno-influenced "Fantastique no.5" - left Mercury due to a dispute over the mix of planned second single "Plastic World." The band had accumulated between two and three albums' worth of recorded tracks which would be eventually uploaded by Shadric Toop to an official posthumous Youtube channel circa 2019. Back in early 1997, the band dissolved and Miller revived his old band Supercharger. Sexus, who had also released a second single '"The Official End Of It All" and recorded an album The Boyfriend Olympics, similarly fell out with ZTT over the mix of planned third single "How Do You Kiss". After the fallout, they were frozen into inactivity due to a dispute with management over their final payout from ZTT but would eventually re-emerge in 2002 as the Psychodelicates with a download/mail order album Psychodelicates Go Adventuring. The album was reissued on Spotify under the Sexus bandname in 2021, followed by a compilation of mostly Romo-era Sexus, Good Boys Gone Bad the next year. Vintage Sexus tracks have since sporadically continued to surface on Spotify.

Viva meanwhile, despite continuing to demo material, never released any records and would later rename themselves Scala 5 and revert to a heavier guitar sound before their demise circa 2000. Personal differences between Xavior and his bandmates led to the demise of DexDexTer in early 1997 just as their single "Another Car Another CarCrash" was released with a follow-up "Chemistry of Youth" also ready for release. Both parties remained signed tor Trade2; the bandmates recorded a set of four demos for the label as "ExDexTer" but were swiftly dropped as eventually was Xavior in 1998 after he had recorded an unreleased solo album, Chainsaw Mass Appeal and appeared in the film Velvet Goldmine. After several years producing, playing keyboards for Placebo and recording further unreleased solo albums, he would reemerge as a frontman in the late 2000s fronting Paul St Paul and the Apostles with David Ryder Prangley. His ex bandmates Even and Gage later worked together as Sparking Toys 1997-2016 collaborating with various musicians (including Alan Parsons' son Jeremy "Jel" Parsons) - since 2016 Even has worked alone as ArtEfficient Intelligenz.

Thus by the middle of 1997 it was left to Orlando and Minty to be the most prolific – and in that sense the most successful – Romo bands as they were the only two of the seven core acts to reach the stage of releasing their respective albums. Orlando had already released two singles "Just for a Second" and The Magic EP in late 1996 (the latter of which achieved #96 on the UK Singles Chart) and a third, "Nature's Hated" in spring 1997. They also had toured extensively with Kenickie and scored the only UK Top 75 chart hit of any core Romo act with their contribution to the Fever Pitch soundtrack EP, a cover of Tim Hardin's "How Can We Hang On to a Dream". They released their album Passive Soul in October that year before Dickon Edwards departed to found Fosca. Tim Chipping would continue to use the Orlando band name for a planned folk-orientated second album under the working title Sick Folk (to have included a collaboration with Kenickie/Rosita members Marie Du Santiago and Emmy-Kate Montrose), before finally dissolving Orlando in Spring 2000.

Minty, likewise, having released singles "Useless Man", "Plastic Bag" (a No. 2 hit in the Netherlands), "That's Nice" and "Nothing", released their parent album Open Wide in late 1997 before also disbanding, with some members later forming rock band The Servant. With all the core bands and major London clubnights now defunct (or at least no longer in their Romo incarnations), the Romo scene effectively came to an end.

== Legacy ==
In Romo's wake over the next several years came a fresh wave of glam/style orientated clubnights. One of the first of these was Club Kitten, the successor to Club Skinny, based at the latter's old location of HQ's in Camden and featuring Stuart Miller as DJ. Club Kitten, together with The Pony Club in Regent Street, became the hub for a late Romo/post-Romo "New Glam" scene featuring Persecution Complex and post-DexDexTer Xavior. Another important post-Romo club was Stay Beautiful, run by Simon Price at various London locations from 2000–2009 and in Brighton 2011-2016.

Several other Romo musicians ran glam/style orientated club nights – notably Minty vocalist Mathew Glammore's "Kashpoint" (at a January 2004 instalment of which Glammore performed a medley of old Minty songs and a March 2005 instalment of which featured a Minty reunion), Xavior's "Hanky Panky Kabaret" clubnight (and associated meetings in London's Wolsey restaurant) and Dickon Edwards' "Beautiful And Damned" and "Against Nature". Wilde and Nugent would later unleash another scene – the Club Rampage/Club P*rnstar "Bratpop" scene in late 1998 (also the beneficiary of a Melody Maker cover special).

Other promoters also hosted such glam/style-orientated clubnights in the 2000s – most notably Glam-Ou-Rama, which later relocated to Tel Aviv. Romo Night in Sweden, first established in 1996 during the original London scene's lifetime, was still active as of 2003.

Romo was also frequently cited as a precedent for (if not actually an influence on) the electroclash scene of the early 2000s. The Disciples by James Mollison, a book of photographs of music fans, includes a spread of photos of fans at a London concert by major electroclash act Fischerspooner, mostly dressed in Romo-style attire (one of whom is Simon Price). Simon Reynolds deemed electroclash to be "a better-timed Romo, an attempted eighties resurrection bang on the twenty-year anniversary."

Writing and production team Xenomania, who became critically and commercially successful in the 2000s for their work with groups such as Girls Aloud and Sugababes, started out as remixers for songs by several Romo bands, including Hollywood's "Apocalypse Kiss" and Sexus' "How Do You Kiss?". According to Tom Ewing of Freaky Trigger, writing in 2003, Xenomania's Romo roots could be heard in their then-current work. Writing in 2004 in regards to Xenomania's commercial success, Ewing said: "You can find Romo links everywhere if you look!" Ewing also compared Hollywood (whose repertoire had included "Lost in Moscow 3am") to Russian duo t.A.T.u., who he said were "entirely Romo, though it would be more accurate to say that Romo was a spirited runt in a litter that also birthed them."

== Musical characteristics ==
One wing of Romo bands, such as Plastic Fantastic and DexDexTer cleaved towards flamboyant art-glam. Although actually mostly referencing Brian Eno's Here Come the Warm Jets (particularly the tracks "Baby's on Fire" and "Needles in the Camel's Eye"), Fantastique no.5 was reviewed in the NME by Pulp members Russell Senior and Candida Doyle as "Ro-mu - as in Roxy Music. The influences are that transparent!"

Other bands such as Viva, Belvedere Kane, Sexus and to a lesser extent Orlando, took inspiration from the nightclub-orientated Hi-NRG/Handbag house chart pop of the mid 1990s. Viva bassist Lee David described how his band's sound "came from going to clubs and seeing what got people dancing." Sexus's sound was characterised by Price as "intelligent handbag." Musically, Orlando combined the synthesised dance-pop of 1990s boybands and American swingbeat acts with verbose lyrics in the general style of Morrissey and Richey Edwards.

The dance-pop influences seeped through to the scene's art-glam wing also - interviewing Plastic Fantastic, Melody Maker's David Bennun suggested that the band's preferred mix of Plastic World (by dance producer Howard Hughes) "sounds like Hawkwind gone disco." Hollywood's single "Apocalypse Kiss" (transformed from the original dark electropop 1995 demo to a piano house sound by remixers Apollo 440) was described by Tom Ewing of Freaky Trigger as "gothy handbag with big production and those flattened Europop vowels."

Despite the Romo scene being a backlash against the values of Britpop and indie, Stephen Thomas Erlewine of AllMusic nonetheless characterised it as "a fey, arty offspring of Britpop," noting that the genre took influence from "a touch of irony, modernist art, a healthy love of the Style Council and the Spice Girls, inspiration from Pulp, jealousy of Menswear, a vague idea of Roxy Music, heritage in the Smiths and the Manics, and a minor obsession with Dead Poets Society." Erlewine furthermore summarised that "Romo essentially boiled down to a cross between Adam Ant, Roxy Music, Pulp, and Blur, with a hint of an idea of what Bowie may have meant."

== Criticism ==
Being as it was an attack on the very notion of authenticity in music, Romo's inauthenticity was itself declared pernicious by its opponents. While Erlewine praised Fiddling While Romo Burns he nonetheless complained "...There's nothing but style and artifice here, and at crushing levels ... it's filled with affectation and pretension." Others were more blunt about this, such as Super Furry Animals frontman Gruff Rhys. "I hate Romo" he declared, "it's so plastic!"

In his book Shock and Awe: Glam Rock and Its Legacy (2016), Reynolds praised Price and Parkes for penning "a brilliant Romanifesto", but considered many Romo bands – namely DexDexTer, Plastic Fantastic, Sexus and Viva – to "fall a good way short of the rhetoric." He believed Romo was unsuccessful because it was "premature, breaking the twenty-year revival rule by trying to stage an early-eighties resurrection a half-decade ahead of schedule."

== Discography of core bands ==
Two of the seven core bands from the Melody Maker Romo Special released one studio album each. Six of the seven released at least one single during the Romo era. Melody Maker also released a compilation tape of the scene including a track by the remaining core band.

Two more Romo studio albums were recorded - one by a third core band, the other by the lead singer, turned solo artist, of a fourth core band. The latter was fully mastered for release before being rejected by the record label; the former reached the stage of preliminary mixes which the band uploaded posthumously to their official site. The third core band also released a posthumous compilation album and repackaged - under their Romo era name - a later-period studio album originally released under a different bandname.

The fourth and the remaining three core bands also released sufficient tracks for at least one album each, two of these four spawning enough for multiple albums. This material surfaced either as promotional cassettes at the time or else subsequently as uploads by band members to official posthumous accounts for each band on download sites.

=== Genre compilation ===
- Fiddling While Romo Burns - compilation cassette included with Melody Maker, 9 March 1996
1. DexDexTer – "Creature Feature"
2. Hollywood – "Lights Camera Revolution" (Dave Ball mix)
3. Plastic Fantastic – "Complimentary Electron"
4. Viva – "Now" (Marc Almond/ Neal X version)
5. Orlando – "Nature's Hated" (first version)

=== Orlando ===
See Orlando discography

=== Minty ===
See Minty discography

=== Sexus ===
Tracks marked with an asterisk were uploaded to the Psychodelicates website in the early 2000s

Compilation Album:

- Good Boys Gone Bad (2021 Remasters) (Spotify, 2022)
1. "Life on Earth"
2. "16 Is a Dangerous Age"*
3. "The Town Where No-one Gets Off"*
4. "Nico Would Have Loved You" (recorded 2003)*
5. "Jet Girl Loves Astroboy"
6. "Doing The Right Thing (is the Right Thing To Do)"*
7. "Where The Wild Things Are"
8. "Glamour"
9. "Good Boy Gone Bad"*
10. "Boyfriend in the Hospital"*
11. "Rope Heaven by the Neck"
12. "Unrepentant"*

Track 4 was one of two new 2003 songs uploaded (along with "Inner Space Outer Space" as mentioned below) to the Psychodelicates website upon recording. Track 11 is from the "Edenites" CD single - see below.
All other songs were recorded for the planned album The Boyfriend Olympics - by the end of their time with ZTT, the band intended to remix these for release to a more guitar-based sound such as on tracks 1 and 5 and "Still Sulking After All These Years" and "Loud Love" below.
In June 2021, two tracks from the Psychodelicates' 2002 album Psychodelicates Go Adventuring – "Angels Know My Name" and "Psychodelica" – were remastered and reissued on Spotify under the Sexus bandname, followed by the full album shortly afterwards.

Singles:
Lifetime:

- "Edenites" (Svelte Records, SVC 1, 1995)
1. "Edenites"
2. "Cheap Thrills and Expensive Regrets"
3. "Rope Heaven by the Neck"
- "The Official End of It All" (ZTT ZANG77CD, 1996) - UK #90
1. "The Official End of It All"
2. "Longing Without Belonging"
3. "King of the Fairground Swing"
- "How Do You Kiss?" (ZTT, ZANG 86 CD 1996, withdrawn – promo copies circulate)
1. "How Do You Kiss?"
2. "Joe January"*
3. "Beaten Up by Girls"*

Posthumous:

- "Where The Wild Things Are" (Spotify 2021)
1. "Where The Wild Things Are"
2. "Wild Things"* (an early 1995 experimental workout version of Track 1.)
- "Northern Boys" (Spotify 2023)
1. "Northern Boys" (A live clip of this song featured on Katie Puckrick's Sunday Show BBC2 1995)
- "Inner Space Outer Space" (Spotify 2023)
1. "Inner Space Outer Space"* (recorded 2003)
- "Loud Love" (Spotify 2023)
1. "Loud Love"
- "Still Sulking After All These Years" (Spotify 2025)
1. "Still Sulking After All These Years"
2. "Loud Love"
- "Patron Saint of the Unemployed"
1. "Patron Saint of the Unemployed"(Spotify 2026)

The two ZTT singles also each included a remix of the respective lead tracks. Both were reissued in full on iTunes as most of ZTT – The Singles Collection – Volume 3 Several other tracks from the Good Boys Gone Bad compilation are available as one track singles on Spotify and other platforms

=== Hollywood ===
Single:

- "Apocalype Kiss" (Mother Records, MUMCD 79, 1996)
1. "Apocalypse Kiss" (plus remixes)

Promo cassette 1995:

- "Lights Camera Revolution" (first version)
- "Bored Stupid"
- "Lost in Moscow 3am"
- "Apocalypse Kiss" (first version)
- "Kung Fu Bitch"
- "Tuning Into Search Control"
- "Last Train to London"
- "Black Champagne"
- "Statuesque"
- "50 Ways to Kill Your Lover"
- "Positive/Negative (And The Grey Connection)"

=== Plastic Fantastic ===
Single:

- "Fantastique No.5" (Mercury – PFCD 001 1996) - UK #94
1. "Fantastique No.5"
2. "Titled"

Also included remixes of lead track

Downloads:

The following Plastic Fantastic songs, unreleased during the band's lifetime, were posted to the band's official Plastic Fantastic '96 YouTube Channel and Soundcloud accounts by guitarist/keyboard player Shadric Toop between 2016 and 2019. Songs marked with an asterisk were previously uploaded by Nugent to the This Is Romo website circa 2002.

- "Plastic World" *
- "My Friend's Electric" *
- "Jesus Loves That Rock 'N Roll" *
- "Godzilla Versus the Mighty Quaalude" *
- "Obsession"
- "Dripping On You"
- "Future Is"
- "21st Century Lobster"
- "Elvis Played Disco"
- "Cadillac Attack"
- "Bitter Tales Of An Englishman"
- "Some Kind Of A Hell"
  (aka "Blood Flowers")
- "How The West Was Won"
- "Hex"
- "Siegfried Follies"
- "Do You No. 6"
- "Making The Most Of Your Bedroom"
- "Different Ways To Hurt Yourself"
- "Speaking To Dogs"
- "Seratonin"
- "Luna Landa"
- "Point Blank Mystery"

=== Viva ===
Downloads:

The following Viva tracks were uploaded by Nugent to the This Is Romo website circa 2002.

- "Now" (Marc Almond/ Neal X version)
- "The Devil You Love"
- "We Want Everything"
- "Girl Racer"

Further Viva tracks were posted by the band to an official posthumous Myspace account in the late 2000s:
(The three songs marked with an asterisk are from a May 1997 recording session and reflect a move by the band away from their Romo-era sound towards heavier guitar rock):

- "Now" (Pete Schwier version)
- "Heaven"
- "Skyscrapers"
- "Fly Your Own Flag"
- "Now And Forever"
- "Beautessen" *
- "Beauty Sleep" *
- "Neon Smile" *

Live excerpts of two further Viva songs, "This Is Your Life" and "Tomorrow's World" as well as an early arrangement of "Now" exist on a Japanese TV feature on Romo.

=== DexDexTer ===
Single:

- "Another Car Another CarCrash" (Trade 2 – TRD SC CD 002 1996)
1. "Another Car Another CarCrash" (released version)
2. "Headlites/Headlines"
3. "Car Trex"

A second single for Trade 2 (Chemistry of Youth (version 3)/ Flower Power/ Supa Bupa) was recorded but unreleased.

Promo cassette singles (1995):

- "Chemistry of Youth" (version 2) / "V.D."
- "April 31st" / "Winter Again"

Downloads:
The following tracks, recorded in the same or similar sessions to the promo cassette tracks, were uploaded by the band's keyboard player Even to his Soundcloud account in 2021 (along with much of the above-listed material and a new 2021 recording by Even and Gjeih of the band's song "Yet I May Be") and subsequently shared by Even to Simon Price's Facebook group for Romo:

- "Maybe I'm Not" (two versions)
- "Remember The Sunset"
- "Empty Screen"
- "Friendly Fire"
- "Night Talk"
- "Rosa Mystica"
- "Silver Images"
- "Another Car Another CarCrash"
  (version 1)
- "Chemistry of Youth" (version 1)
- "April 31st and The Day After"
- "Winter Again and Blue Planet"
  (three versions)

Xavior's 1997 Chainsaw Mass Appeal album for Island Records, including a fourth version of "Chemistry of Youth", as well as his former bandmates' "ExDexTer" audition session for the label that same year, also circulated as bootlegs among the Club Skinny/Arcadia attendees community. So too did unofficial copies of the above-listed DexDexTer and Hollywood cassette tracks and Arcadia co-promoter/DJ Toby Slater's "Brattish" synthpop project demo, most of the eleven songs on which were re-recorded as guitar-based indie pop by his later band Catch.
