= I Wanna Be Your Doll =

Single by Rachel Stamp

from the album "Hymns For Strange Children"
- B-side: "Girl You're Just A Slave To Your Man", "Calling All Destroyers"
- Released: March 2nd, 1999 (UK)
- Genre: Alternative rock, glam rock
- Length: 9:13
- Label: Madfish/Snapper
- Songwriter(s): 1, 2: Rachel Stamp; 3: Marc Bolan
- Producer(s): 1: John Fryer

Rachel Stamp singles chronology
"I Got The Worm" (1998)	"I Wanna Be Your Doll" (1999)	"Spank (single)" (1999)

== Overview ==
The single for "I Wanna Be Your Doll" was the only Rachel Stamp single to be released via the Snapper/Madfish label. The release of the single was followed by a tour of the UK titled the "Permanent Damage Tour". A promotional video, directed by Corin Hardy was made to promote the single.

== CD single ==
Released March 2, 1999
(SMASCD104)

=== Track listing ===
1. I Wanna Be Your Doll
2. Girl You're Just A Slave To Your Man
3. Calling All Destroyers

=== Facts ===
- This was the band’s only release through the Madfish/Snapper label.
- The single was only released on CD and reached Number 15 in the NME Indie chart and 160 in the UK Singles Chart.
- The single’s cover was inspired by a photo of Marlene Dietrich.
- "I Wanna Be Your Doll" – produced, engineered and mixed by John Fryer – was also included on the band's debut album, "Hymns For Strange Children".
- A live version of "Girl, You're Just A Slave To Your Man" was included on the "Stampax" album.
- “Calling All Destroyers” is a cover of a T. Rex song from their "Futuristic Dragon" album, released in 1976.
- Tracks 2 and 3 were recorded by Harvey Birrell.

== Promotional Video ==
- The promotional video for "I Wanna Be Your Doll" was directed by Corin Hardy. The video was banned by MTV due to scenes of doll mutilation.
- David Ryder-Prangley: "...rejected by MTV for having scenes of dolls being mutilated. Features me, Will and Robin..." (taken from a fansite interview, 2004) [1]
