= Black Cherry =

Black Cherry may refer to:

- Prunus serotina
- Dark-skinned cultivars of Prunus avium, such as Kordia cherry
- Black Cherry (Goldfrapp album), 2003
- Black Cherry (Goldfrapp song), 2003
- Black Cherry (Kumi Koda album), 2006
- Black Cherry (Rachel Stamp song), 2002
- Black Cherry (wrestler), a Japanese professional wrestler
- Black Cherry (band), a London, UK electronic indie band
- Black Cherry, a graphic novel by Doug TenNapel
