= Bring Me the Head of Rachel Stamp EP =

Bring Me The Head of... Rachel Stamp EP

EP by Rachel Stamp
- Released: November 11, 1996 (UK)
- Genre: Alternative rock; glam rock
- Length: 13:03
- Producer: Mal Campbell; Tony Wilson; Bobby Nolan

Rachel Stamp chronology
Hey Hey Michael You're Really Fantastic (1996)	Bring Me The Head of... Rachel Stamp EP (1996)	My Sweet Rose EP (1997)

Bring Me The Head of... Rachel Stamp 10" Vinyl

Madonna... Cher... Promo CD

Bring Me the Head of... Rachel Stamp EP is the first EP by British rock band Rachel Stamp. It was also their final release through major label WEA. It was released in November 1996 on three formats - CD single, Limited Edition 10" vinyl of 1000 copies and cassette. A promotional single was also issued to radio stations featuring the EP's first track, "Madonna... Cher...". Unlike previous singles, there was no promotional video made to promote the EP.

== CD single, 10" vinyl and cassette ==
Released November 11, 1996
(WEA086CD/WEA086TE)

=== Track listing ===
1. "Madonna... Cher..."
2. "Tammy Machine"
3. "Every Night I Pray for the Bomb"
4. "Mike Rowe's Christmas Cupboard"

=== Facts ===
- The EP would be Rachel Stamp's third and final release through WEA
- Released on CD, Cassette and a numbered Limited Edition Lime Green 10" vinyl of 1000 copies
- The 10" has "I Hear Your Momma's Coming Home" etched on the centre ring of Side A and "My Wife's Out On the Razzle-Dazzle" on Side B.
- "Madonna... Cher..." was to be included on the band's unreleased WEA album, "Fight The Force of Evil". It later appeared on the band's Sweet Shop compilation. "Every Night I Pray for the Bomb" also appears on the CD version of the Rachel Stamp best of compilation - "Now I'm Nailed To Your Bedroom Wall, I've Only Got Myself To Blame" .
- "Tammy Machine" features Mike Rowe on backing vocals. The song features a dubbed live audience over a studio recording of the song.
- "Mike Rowe's Christmas Cupboard" is an instrumental that was written and recorded on the same day
- Front cover picture by Masoud Golsorkhi

=== "Madonna... Cher..." promo CD single ===
Released November 1996
(WEA086CDDJ)

1. "Madonna... Cher..."
- To promote the release of the EP, a 1 track CD single of "Madonna... Cher..." was issued to radio stations around the UK.
