= Spank (song) =

Single by Rachel Stamp

from the album "Hymns For Strange Children"
- B-side: "Pink Skab", "Stealing Clothes From Shelley Barrett"
- Released: September 20, 1999 (UK)
- Genre: Alternative rock, glam rock
- Length: 9:13
- Label: Cruisin' Records
- Songwriters: 1, 2: Rachel Stamp; 3: Crewdson/Ryder-Prangley
- Producers: 3: Rachel Stamp & Dave Eringa

Rachel Stamp singles chronology
"I Wanna Be Your Doll" (1999)	"Spank" (1999)	"Didn't I Break My Heart Over You" (2000)

"Spank" is a single by London glam rock band, Rachel Stamp. This single was the first release via the Cruisin' Records label, an independent record label set up by the band's manager, Sil Wilcox, and distributed across the UK by Pinnacle. There was no promotional video made to promote this release; however, a live video of "Spank" (directed by Corin Hardy and filmed at the band's Hallowe'en show at the London Astoria in 2000) later appeared as a bonus multimedia track on the "Black Cherry" CD single (released in 2002).

== CD single ==
Released September 20, 1999
(CR RS 001)

=== Track listing ===
1. Spank [single mix]
2. Pink Skab
3. Stealing Clothes From Shelley Barrett

=== Facts ===
- "Spank" and "Pink Skab" were included on the band's debut album, "Hymns For Strange Children". However, the version of "Spank" that appears on the album was remixed by Katharine Blake and features a different vocal take.
- Katharine Blake plays strings on 'Spank'.
- 'Spank' and 'Pink Skab' were recorded by Harvey Birrell, who has also worked with, amongst others, Therapy?, Ministry, Buzzcocks and Chrome Hoof.
- This was the last single to feature a song from the band's unreleased album (recorded for WEA in 1996). "Stealing Clothes From Shelley Barrett" was produced by Rachel Stamp and Dave Eringa at Rockfield Studios and was played on the same piano used by Freddie Mercury during the recording of "Bohemian Rhapsody".
- "Pink Skab" and "Stealing Clothes From Shelley Barrett" were recently included on the Rachel Stamp best of compilation, "Now I'm Nailed To Your Bedroom Wall, I've Only Got Myself To Blame", released in 2009. The compilation takes its name from the lyrics to "Pink Skab".
- "Stealing Clothes From Shelley Barrett" was also included on the band's "Sweet Shop" compilation, released in 2004.
- A live recording of "Spank" was released as a B-side on the "Hey Hey Michael You're Really Fantastic... Live!" CD single and the Swedish release of the "Monsters of the New Wave" CD single (released via Raw Power Records in 2000).
