= Pop Singer =

1996 single by Rachel Stamp

Single by Rachel Stamp

from the album Fight the Force of Evil (unreleased album recorded for WEA)
- B-side: "Sluts & Sharks"
- Released: February 26, 1996 (UK)
- Genre: Alternative rock, glam rock
- Length: 5:42
- Label: WEA
- Songwriter(s): Rachel Stamp
- Producer(s): Dave Eringa & Rachel Stamp

Rachel Stamp singles chronology
"Pop Singer" (1996)	"Hey Hey Michael You're Really Fantastic" (1996)

"Pop Singer 7" Single"

Single by Rachel Stamp
- Released: February 26, 1996 (UK)
- Length: 5:43
- Label: WEA

"Pop Singer (radio edit) Promo CD"

Single by Rachel Stamp
- Length: 2:50
- Label: WEA

"Pop Singer" is the debut single from London-based glam rockers Rachel Stamp. It was released in February, 1996 through WEA. The single was released as a 2 track CD single and limited edition pink 7" vinyl of 1000 copies. A promo video was also made for the single's release.

== CD single and 7" Vinyl ==
Released February 26, 1996
(WEA036CD/WEA036)

=== Track listing ===
1. Pop Singer
2. Sluts & Sharks

=== Facts ===
- The band’s debut single through WEA Records
- Released on CD and Limited Edition Pink 7" Vinyl of 1000 copies
- The CD’s label has a special print, which makes it look glittery under the light
- The 7” features an extended intro to “Pop Singer”
- The 7" also has "Lick It Up Baby, Lick It Up" etched on to the center ring of Side A and "Christ On A Bike" on Side B!

=== "Pop Singer" Promo CD single ===
Released February 1996
(WEA036CDDJ)

=== Track listing ===
1. Pop Singer (radio edit)

=== Facts ===
- The promo single features a radio edit of "Pop Singer" featuring a slightly different mix of the song as well as all of the swearing removed
- Received one airplay on Virgin Radio when Chris Evans mistook the single for a Spice Girls CD on his morning radio show

== Promotional video ==
- The promotional video for "Pop Singer" was directed by Max and Dania and filmed in early 1996.
- The video was rarely played on TV and remains in the WEA vaults
- David Ryder-Prangley: "Pop Singer" was directed by MAX and DANIA who also made FIVE's 'everybody get up'. As far as i know this never got shown anywhere and features myself, will, cliff harris and mike rowe. i don't have a copy. i generally hate our videos..." (taken from a Rachel Stamp fansite interview, 2004)
