= Hey Hey Michael You're Really Fantastic =

Single by Rachel Stamp

from the album Fight the Force of Evil (unreleased album recorded for WEA)
- B-side: "Science Fiction", "n.a.u.s.e.a."
- Released: 5 August 1996 (UK)
- Genre: Alternative rock, glam rock
- Length: 9:51
- Label: WEA
- Songwriter(s): Rachel Stamp
- Producer(s): Dave Eringa & Rachel Stamp, Bobby Nolan

Rachel Stamp singles chronology
"Pop Singer" (1996)	"Hey Hey Michael You're Really Fantastic" (1996)	"Bring Me the Head of Rachel Stamp EP" (1996)

"Hey Hey Michael You're Really Fantastic" is a song by Rachel Stamp, released as the second single through WEA. It was released in August 1996 on three formats, CD single, Limited Edition 12" vinyl of 1000 copies and cassette. A promotional video was also made to promote the release. The song is the only Rachel Stamp track to be released twice as a single, with a limited edition live version of the song being issued in 2000 during the band's "Hymns For Strange Children Tour" of the UK.

"Hey Hey Michael... 12" single"

Single by Rachel Stamp
- B-side: "Science Fiction", "n.a.u.s.e.a."
- Released: 5 August 1996 (UK)
- Genre: Alternative rock, glam rock
- Length: 9:51
- Label: WEA
- Songwriter(s): Rachel Stamp
- Producer(s): Dave Eringa & Rachel Stamp, Bobby Nolan

"Hey Hey Michael... (radio edit) Promo CD"

Single by Rachel Stamp
- Genre: Alternative rock, glam rock
- Length: 3:39
- Label: WEA
- Songwriter(s): Rachel Stamp
- Producer(s): Dave Eringa & Rachel Stamp

== CD single, 12" vinyl and cassette ==
Released 5 August 1996
(WEA049CD/WEA049T/WEA049C 0630-14728-4)

=== Track listing ===
1. "Hey Hey Michael You're Really Fantastic" (single edit)
2. "Science Fiction"
3. "n.a.u.s.e.a."

=== Facts ===
- The second single through WEA
- Released on CD, Cassette and a Limited Edition Numbered 12" Vinyl of 1000 copies
- "Science Fiction" was frequently used to open shows at early Rachel Stamp gigs
- The recording of "n.a.u.s.e.a." features Jon Lee of Feeder, on backing vocals
- The tracks included on this single are also on the band's "Sweet Shop" compilation including a full-length version of "Hey Hey Michael..."

=== "Hey Hey Michael..." promo CD single ===
Released August 1996
(WEA036CDDJ)

=== Track listing ===
1. Hey Hey Michael You're Really Fantastic (radio edit)

=== Facts ===
- The promo single features an exclusive radio edit of the song

== Promotional video ==
- The promotional video for "Hey Hey Michael..." was directed by Chris Williams
- David Ryder-Prangley: "Hey Hey Michael...” was directed by CHRIS WILLIAMS and camerawork by some bloke who did the PRODIGY 'firestarter' video... i almost got blinded by an ultraviolet light in a bit that didn't make it to the final cut. got shown maybe once on mtv and on Swedish TV. the guitars and bass we used in this video were stolen. they wouldn't let us have fire. i don't like it. (taken from a fansite interview, 2004)

"Hey Hey Michael You're Really Fantastic... Live!"

Single by Rachel Stamp

from the album "Stampax"
- B-side: "I Got The Worm (live)", "Spank (live)"
- Released: 15 May 2000 (UK)
- Genre: Alternative rock, glam rock
- Length: 11:36
- Label: Cruisin'
- Songwriter(s): Rachel Stamp
- Producer(s): Gareth Parton & Rachel Stamp

Rachel Stamp singles chronology
"Didn't I Break My Heart Over You" (2000)	"Hey Hey Michael You're Really Fantastic... Live!" (2000)	"Monsters of the New Wave" (2000)

== Live version ==
To promote the forthcoming release of Rachel Stamp's live album Stampax, the band released a limited edition CD single of "Hey Hey Michael You're Really Fantastic", recorded live during their "Hymns For Strange Children Tour" of the UK in 2000. The single also featured two live recordings of "I Got The Worm" and "Spank" as B-Sides that were not included on the album.

== CD single ==
Released 15 May 2000
(CR RS 004)

=== Track listing ===
1. Hey Hey Michael You're Really Fantastic (live)
2. I Got The Worm (live)
3. Spank (live)

=== Facts ===
- "Hey Hey Michael..." is the only Rachel Stamp single to be released twice: initially as a studio recording with the WEA line-up and then as a live single featuring the current foursome
- Released as a limited edition CD single of 1000 copies
- Artwork and design by Michael Corran. The artwork has a similar design to the original single release of "Hey Hey Michael You're Really Fantastic".
- All tracks were recorded live on the "Hymns For Strange Children Tour" of the UK in early 2000
- The recordings were mixed by Gareth Parton for this release. "Hey Hey Michael..." was remixed by Max Bisgrove for inclusion on the "Stampax" album.
