= I Got the Worm =

Single by Rachel Stamp

from the album "Hymns for Strange Children"
- B-side: "Queen Bee", "Heroine"
- Released: June 29, 1998 (UK)
- Genre: Alternative rock, glam rock
- Length: 9:32
- Label: Bitch Vinyl
- Songwriter: Rachel Stamp
- Producers: John Fryer, Dave Eringa & Rachel Stamp, Bobby Nolan

Rachel Stamp singles chronology
"My Sweet Rose EP" (1997)	"I Got the Worm" (1998)	"I Wanna Be Your Doll" (1999)

"I Got the Worm" is Rachel Stamp's second release via their own "Bitch Vinyl" imprint. "I Got the Worm" was produced by John Fryer and Rachel Stamp. Like the "My Sweet Rose EP", this single also features two tracks taken from the band's unreleased WEA album, "Fight the Force of Evil", as B-Sides. A promotional video was made for this release.

== CD single ==
Released June 29, 1998
(STAMP005CD)

=== Track listing ===
1. I Got the Worm
2. Queen Bee
3. Heroine

=== Facts ===
- Released on CD Single via Bitch Vinyl
- "I Got the Worm" was produced by John Fryer. The single was later included on the band's debut album, "Hymns for Strange Children, released in 2000. [1]
- The single also features “Queen Bee” and “Heroine” from the unreleased WEA album, "Fight the Force of Evil".
- The single features a remix of "Queen Bee" by Mike 'Spike' Drake
- Early pressings of the single featured an alternative mix of “Queen Bee”. This early mix was by Bobby Nolan who had worked with the band on the recording sessions of the unreleased WEA album. This mix can be found on the band's "Sweet Shop" compilation CD. [2]
- "Heroine" was one of the band's earliest recordings and was also included on the limited-edition version of "Oceans of Venus", released in the USA
- A promotional video of "I Got the Worm" also exists. It is unknown who directed the video but it features live footage of the band performing the song and lots of low budget video effects.
