= Mike Rowe (musician) =

British musician

- Born: 1970 (age 55–56); Buckinghamshire, England
- Genres: Rock; Britpop; Alternative rock; Pop rock
- Occupations: Musician; session keyboardist; record producer; musical director
- Instruments: Keyboards; piano; Hammond organ; Wurlitzer; Fender Rhodes; Mellotron; synthesizer
- Years active: 1994–present
- Member of: Noel Gallagher's High Flying Birds
- Formerly of: Oasis; Sheryl Crow; Rachel Stamp; Double Six; Future Sound of London; Amorphous Androgynous
- Website: mikeyrowe.co.uk

Mike Rowe (born 1970) also credited as Mikey Rowe is a British musician. He was a member of Oasis from 1996–2002 and Sheryl Crow's touring band from 1999–2010. He has been the keyboardist for Noel Gallagher's High Flying Birds from 2011. The band won a Q Award in 2015 for the album Chasing Yesterday.

== Early life ==
Rowe was born in 1970 in Buckinghamshire, England. He grew up in Aston Clinton, in a musical household and his two older brothers are musicians. Rowe began playing piano at the age of two or three, learning by ear along to Beatles records; self-taught, he doesn't read music. Rowe attended Aylesbury Grammar School. In Aylesbury, he played in the band "The Advocates".

== Career ==
=== Early career (1994–1996) ===
Rowe was a founding member of the glam rock group, Rachel Stamp, joining after answering an advertisement in the Melody Maker. He earned a reputation as a session player in the London music scene. Rowe played with others including Future Sound of London.

=== Oasis (1996–2002) ===
Rowe joined Oasis in 1996, shortly after the release of (What's the Story) Morning Glory?. His first appearance with the band was at the Royal Festival Hall, London on 23 August 1996 for an MTV Unplugged concert. At the time, Rowe was not expected to continue playing with the band. However, Noel Gallagher then invited Rowe to record with him at Abbey Road Studios, beginning a 30 year working relationship.

During his six years with Oasis, the band released Be Here Now (1997), Standing on the Shoulder of Giants (2000), Heathen Chemistry (2002), Don't Believe the Truth (2005) and the compilation The Masterplan (1998). He also appeared on the BBC's Later... with Jools Holland on 1 April 2000.

He departed the band in 2002 and was replaced by Jay Darlington.

=== Sheryl Crow touring band (1999–2010) ===
In 1999, while still working with Oasis, Rowe began performing with Sheryl Crow, starting with the Sheryl Crow and Friends: Live from Central Park concert on 14 September 1999. In 2009, he celebrated 10 years with the band. He left Oasis to join Crow's band full-time. He was with the band for eleven years.

=== Noel Gallagher's High Flying Birds (2011–present) ===
Rowe was one of the first musicians that Noel Gallagher recruited for Noel Gallagher's High Flying Birds after Oasis disbanded in 2009. Rowe has played keyboards on the group's albums Noel Gallagher's High Flying Birds (2011), Chasing Yesterday (2015), Who Built the Moon? (2017), and Council Skies (2023).

Noel Gallagher and Mikey Rowe performing at Metropolis Studios, London, for the Apple TV+ documentary Once in a Lifetime Sessions (2018).

In 2018, Rowe appeared in the Apple TV+ documentary, Once in a Lifetime Sessions with Noel Gallagher. On the 2023 tour, Gallagher frequently played an acoustic version of the song Dead In The Water, accompanied solely by Rowe.

Noel Gallagher and Mikey Rowe at Metropolis Studios, 2018.

In addition to studio recording, Rowe serves as the musical director for the band's live performances.

=== Other session work ===
Rowe has recorded with artists including David Gilmour, Mick Jagger, Ed Sheeran, Stevie Nicks, Nas, Damian Marley, and Stereophonics.

He contributed to the SuperHeavy (2011) project, featuring Mick Jagger, Joss Stone, Damian Marley, and A. R. Rahman. He played keyboards on Stevie Nicks's In Your Dreams (2011), David Gilmour's Rattle That Lock (2015), Ed Sheeran's ÷ album (2017), and four Stereophonics albums (2013–2022). He was also the organist on the soundtrack for the film The Trial of the Chicago 7 (2020).

In 2016, he was the keyboardist on Druv Kent's single "What It's All About".

== Discography ==
=== With Oasis ===
Year	Title	Role
1996	MTV Unplugged (released 2021)	Keyboards, piano
1997	Be Here Now	Keyboards
1998	The Masterplan	Keyboards
2000	Standing on the Shoulder of Giants	Keyboards
2002	Heathen Chemistry	Piano
2005	Don't Believe the Truth	Keyboards

=== With Noel Gallagher's High Flying Birds ===
Year	Title	Role
2011	Noel Gallagher's High Flying Birds	Keyboards
2015	Chasing Yesterday	Keyboards
2017	Who Built the Moon?	Additional keyboards
2021	Back the Way We Came: Vol. 1 (2011–2021)	Keyboards
2023	Council Skies	Keyboards

=== With Sheryl Crow ===
Year	Title	Role
1999	Sheryl Crow and Friends: Live from Central Park	Keyboards
2008	Detours	Flute sample, sampler

=== Other selected credits ===
Year	Artist	Title	Role
2010	Nas & Damian Marley	Distant Relatives	Keyboards
2011	SuperHeavy	SuperHeavy	Keyboards, organ, piano, synthesizer
2011	Stevie Nicks	In Your Dreams	Keyboards
2012	Bill Fay	Life Is People	Hammond organ, Rhodes, Mellotron, Wurlitzer
2015	David Gilmour	Rattle That Lock	Keyboards
2017	Ed Sheeran	÷ (Divide)	Keyboards
2020	The Trial of the Chicago 7	Soundtrack	Organist
