= Rachel Stamp =

English rock band

- Origin: London, England
- Genre: Rock
- Years active: 1994–present
- Label: Serena/Cargo Records
- Members: Shaheena Dax; Will Crewdson; David Ryder Prangley
- Past members: Thighpaulsandra; Mike Rowe; Cliff Harris; Belle Star; Alan van Kleef; Robin Guy
- Website: www.myspace.com/rachelstamp

Rachel Stamp are an English rock band formed in London in 1994. Their debut album, Hymns For Strange Children, was released in 2000, followed by Oceans of Venus two years later.

== History ==
Rachel Stamp were formed in 1994 when David Ryder Prangley met Will Crewdson before recruiting Cliff Harris and Mike Rowe. The band signed to WEA Records, but were dropped without releasing the album they had recorded after Clive Black, who had signed the band, left the label. Harris and Rowe left soon after before Crewdson and Ryder Prangley recruited drummer Robin Guy and released several E.P.s through their own label 'Bitch Vinyl'. The band built up a considerable live following and received favourable coverage from magazines such as Kerrang!, Melody Maker and Metal Hammer. They appeared in the film 'G.M.T. Mean Time' produced by Taylor Hackford. Keyboard player Shaheena Dax joined the band in time to record Hymns For Strange Children, their first official album release. It was recorded in two weeks with John Fryer as record producer, and upon its release went to the top of the NME's Independent Chart. Around this time the band headlined the Astoria Theatre in London.

The band next signed to Pure Stirling Records, who released their second album Oceans Of Venus in the UK. It was subsequently released in the US by Captiva Records, and in Germany through Sony Music. The video for the single 'Black Cherry' was playlisted on music channel VH1. Robin Guy left the band before Rachel Stamp headed to the USA to play as part of the 'United II' tour featuring Pigface and Dope. Shortly after this the band became inactive for a few years despite never officially splitting up. In 2009, Guy returned to the group for a headline show at London's O2 Academy Islington to support their best of compilation album, Now I'm Nailed To Your Bedroom Wall, I've Only Got Myself To Blame. This was followed by a short UK tour in late 2009.

In 2010, Will Crewdson and David Ryder-Prangley played alongside Adam Ant on guitar and bass for performances around London. Ant and former longtime collaborator Marco Pirroni had previously guested with Rachel Stamp at a 1997 gig at the original Camden Monarch. Crewdson later returned to Ant's band as joint guitarist in early 2014 (appearing on the concert DVD Dirk Live At The Apollo) and is still presently a member. He was sole guitarist for Ant following the sudden death of bandmate Tom Edwards during a US tour in January 2017 until the recruitment of replacement Adam Leach later that year. Crewdson has also worked with LIVAN, fronted by Greek-born musician Cosmas Livanos.

In 2025, the band played at The 100 Club as openers for The Gospel.

== Critical reception ==
Of their 2025 performance at The 100 Club, Rockshot Magazine said: "Rachel Stamp may never have reached the mainstream success they deserved, but nights like this prove their enduring magic. After personal loss and years away, they returned not just intact but revitalised — still one of the most exciting, unpredictable, and heartfelt live bands around."

== Post band ==
=== Will Crewdwon ===
Will Crewdson and Sheheena Dax formed a band She Made Me Do It. They released two EPs - "She Made Me Do It" and Garbos Pool and, in January 2015, supported Sigue Sigue Sputnik at Electrowerkz. John Robb (Louder Than War) made them his artist of the day in September 2013.

=== Robin Guy ===
Robin Guy has performed with various bands including Faith No More, Bruce Dickinson, Eric Faulkner's Bay City Rollers, Sham 69 and The Business.

=== David Ryder Prangley ===
David Ryder Prangley performed with Adam Ant, Peter Murphy, Angie Bowie, Eric Faulkner's Bay City Rollers. In 2020, he released his debut solo album 'Black magic & True Love'.

=== Clif Harris ===
Cliff Harris went on to join Liberty 37.

=== Mike Rowe ===
Mike Rowe has performed with Oasis, Noel Gallagher and Sheryl Crow.

=== Robin Guy ===
Drummer Robin Guy died from cancer on 12 September 2024, at the age of 54.

=== Belle Star ===
Belle Star died in early 2023.

== Members ==
=== Current ===
- David Ryder Prangley - bass guitar and vocals
- Will Crewdson - lead guitar
- Shaheena Dax - keyboards

=== Former ===
- Thighpaulsandra - synthesisers (1995)
- Mike Rowe - synthesisers (1995–1997)
- Cliff Harris - drums (1995–1997)
- Robin Guy - drums (1997–2002, 2009–2024; his death)
- Belle Star - drums (2003–2005) (also member of Killing Miranda)
- Alan van Kleef - drums (2003–2004) (also member of Ariel-X)

== Discography ==
=== Studio albums ===
- Hymns for Strange Children (released 21 February 2000, on CD (CR RS 003))
- Oceans of Venus (UK Version) (released 13 May 2002, on CD (CD SML 500))(Limited US Edition) (released 18 March 2003, on CD (CRO301)) (US Version) (released 21 October 2003, on CD (UIN 1079))

=== Compilation albums ===
- Sweet Shop (Limited Edition) (released 3 May 2004, on CD (RS SS 001))
- Now I'm Nailed to Your Bedroom Wall, I've Only Got Myself to Blame (released 27 April 2009. Serena Records)

=== Singles/EPs ===
- "Pop Singer" (released 26 February 1996, on CD and limited edition pink 7" vinyl (WEA036CD/WEA036))
- "Hey Hey Michael You're Really Fantastic" (released 5 August 1996, on CD, cassette and limited edition 12" vinyl (WEA049CD/WEA049T))
- "Bring Me The Head of Rachel Stamp EP" (released 11 November 1996 on CD and limited edition green 10" vinyl (WEA086CD/WEA086TE))
- "My Sweet Rose" (released 8 December 1997, on CD and limited edition 7" vinyl (STAMP004CD/STAMP004))
- "I Got the Worm" (released 29 June 1998, on CD (STAMP005CD))
- "I Wanna Be Your Doll" (released 2 March 1999, on CD (SMASCD104))
- "Spank" (released 20 September 1999, on CD (CR RS 001))
- "Didn't I Break My Heart Over You" (released 7 February 2000, on CD and limited edition 7" vinyl (CR RS 002/CR RS 7002))
- "Hey Hey Michael You're Really Fantastic... Live!" (released 15 May 2000, on limited edition (1,000 copies) CD (CR RS 004))
- "Monsters of the New Wave" (European Version) (released June 2000, on CD (RP-010))
- "Monsters of the New Wave" (UK Version) (released 2 October 2000, on CD and limited edition 7" vinyl (CR RS 005/CR RS 7005))
- "Stampax" (released 1 September 2000, on CD (CR RS 006))
- "Black Cherry" (released 22 April 2002, on 2CDs and limited edition cherry 7" vinyl (CD SML 001/CD SML 001X)
- "Honey" / "Queen of The Universe" (released 15 November 2004, on double A-side CD (STAMPCD012))

=== Box set ===
- "Stampax" (Box set) / "Hymns for Strange Children" [repackaged] (released 16 October 2000 (CR RS 003L))

=== Unreleased ===
- Fight the Force of Evil (unreleased album recorded for WEA between 1996 and 1997, but included on the 2004 'Sweet Shop' release)
- "Do Me In Once and I'll Be Sad.../Home Made Sex Change" (unreleased double A-side single for Pure Stirling, 2002)
- Ravenous (unfinished studio album, 2004)
