= Black Cherry (Rachel Stamp song) =

2002 single by Rachel Stamp

Single by Rachel Stamp

from the album Oceans of Venus
- B-side: "Superstars of Heartache", "Executioner's Nightmare Song"
- Released: 22 April 2002 (UK)
- Genre: Alternative rock, glam rock
- Length: 9:51
- Label: Pure Stirling
- Songwriter(s): Rachel Stamp
- Producer(s): Roger Tebbutt

Rachel Stamp singles chronology
"Monsters of the New Wave" (2000)	"Black Cherry" (2002)	"Honey/Queen of the Universe" (2004)

"Black Cherry"

Single by Rachel Stamp

from the album Oceans of Venus
- B-side: "Jet Black Supersonic", "Spank" (live video)
- Released: 22 April 2002 (UK)
- Length: 6:09
- Label: Pure Stirling
- Songwriter(s): 'Black Cherry': Ryder-Prangley/Crewdson 'Jet Black Supersonic': Ryder-Prangley/Dax 'Spank': Rachel Stamp
- Producer(s): 'Black Cherry': Roger Tebbutt & Rachel Stamp 'Jet Black Supersonic': Andy Hawkins

"Black Cherry" is a single by London glam rock band, Rachel Stamp. This single was the band's only single release via Pure Stirling and is the band's most successful single to date (reaching Number 71 on the UK Singles Chart in April 2002). The single was released across 2 CD Singles and a 7" Vinyl, with each release featuring exclusive B-sides. A promotional video for the single was filmed by Paul Harries and received a lot of airplay on Kerrang TV! and MTV2 in the UK.

== CD 1 & 2 ==
Released April 22, 2002
(CD SML 001 / CD SMLX 001)

=== CD 1 Track listing ===
1. Black Cherry (radio edit)
2. Superstars of Heartache
3. Executioner's Nightmare Song

=== CD 2 Track listing ===
1. Black Cherry (album version)
2. Jet Black Supersonic
3. Spank (Live at the London Astoria) (video)

== 7" Vinyl ==
Released April 29, 2002
(SML 001)

=== Track listing ===
1. Black Cherry (album version)
2. 2501 Astral Drive

== Facts ==
- "Black Cherry" was released across 2 CD singles and a limited edition 7" single pressed on purple vinyl.
- Each single featured an exclusive B-Side. CD1 featured "Executioner's Nightmare Song", a song that had been played live during the band's "Monsters of the New Wave Tour" in 2000. CD2 featured live favourite, "Jet Black Supersonic", which can also be found on the "Now I'm Nailed To Your Bedroom Wall, I've Only Got Myself To Blame" compilation. These two songs were produced by Andy Hawkins; the former was mixed by Fulton Dingley, the latter by Roger Tebbutt.
- The 7" single features an instrumental track produced by David Ryder-Prangley and was inspired by "1970's sci-fi movies like "Logan's Run"
- CD 2 featured a bonus video of the band performing "Spank" at their sold out Halloween show at the London Astoria during their "Monsters of the New Wave" Tour, October 2000. The video was directed by Corin Hardy.

== Promotional video ==
- A promotional video for the single was directed by Paul Harries.
- David Ryder-Prangley: "directed by PAUL HARRIES. the most successful vid we've done. all over mtv and kerrang channel. i like this too although it was absolutely freezing all day..." (taken from a fan site interview, 2004)

== Kerrang! Review ==
"THERE'S SOMETHING irresistible about Rachel Stamp's dogged campaign to bring a little perverted glamour back into rock n' roll.

Ideally 'Black Cherry' should only be listened to at Madison Square Garden as thunderous flashbombs illuminate garish under-dressed trannies administering 'oral relief' to the original members of Kiss. Back in the real world, however, David Ryder-Prangley's cartoon bad-ass vocals and filthy riffing with have you rifling through your mum's stiletto collection and tottering around your kitchen in ecstatic glee. Er, ... I've said too much haven't I?"

Reviewed by Paul Brannigan, Kerrang, April 2002 (rating KKK)
