= Diary of an Antibody =

Studio album by Fosca
- Released: August 12, 2002
- Recorded: 2002
- Genre: Indie pop
- Length: 33:31
- Label: Shinkansen Records
- Producer: Ian Catt

Fosca chronology
On Earth to Make the Numbers Up (2000)	Diary of an Antibody (2002)	The Painted Side of the Rocket (2008)

Professional ratings
Review scores
Source	Rating
AllMusic	4/5 stars

Diary of an Antibody is the second album by the English indie pop band Fosca. It was released on August 12, 2002.

== Critical reception ==
AllMusic wrote that Fosca "once again prove why their new wave-inspired sound, while often inspired by the sounds of yesterday, are fresh and exciting, without the slightest hint of sounding contrived." Exclaim! wrote that "they have a well-coiffed, well-dressed singer (Dickon Edwards), all the right synth-heavy instrumentation and campy subject matter, but somehow the final result doesn't have the punch that it should." Scram Magazine called the album "precious and arch London pop."

== Track listing ==
1. "Secret Crush on the Third Trombone" - 2:35
2. "Idiot Savant" - 2:14
3. "The Director's Cut" - 3:02
4. "Oh Well There's Always Reincarnation" - 2:11
5. "Universal Gatecrasher" - 3:28
6. "Supine on the Astroturf" - 4:28
7. "I'm on Your Side" - 3:10
8. "Letter to Saint Christopher" - 3:35
9. "I Know I Have Been Happier" - 5:48
10. "Rude Esperanto" - 3:04

== Personnel ==
- Dickon Edwards (Guitar, Lead Vocals)
- Rachel Stevenson (Keyboards, Vocals)
- Kate Dornan (Keyboards, Recorder, Vocals)
- Sheila B (Cello)
