= Livan (band) =

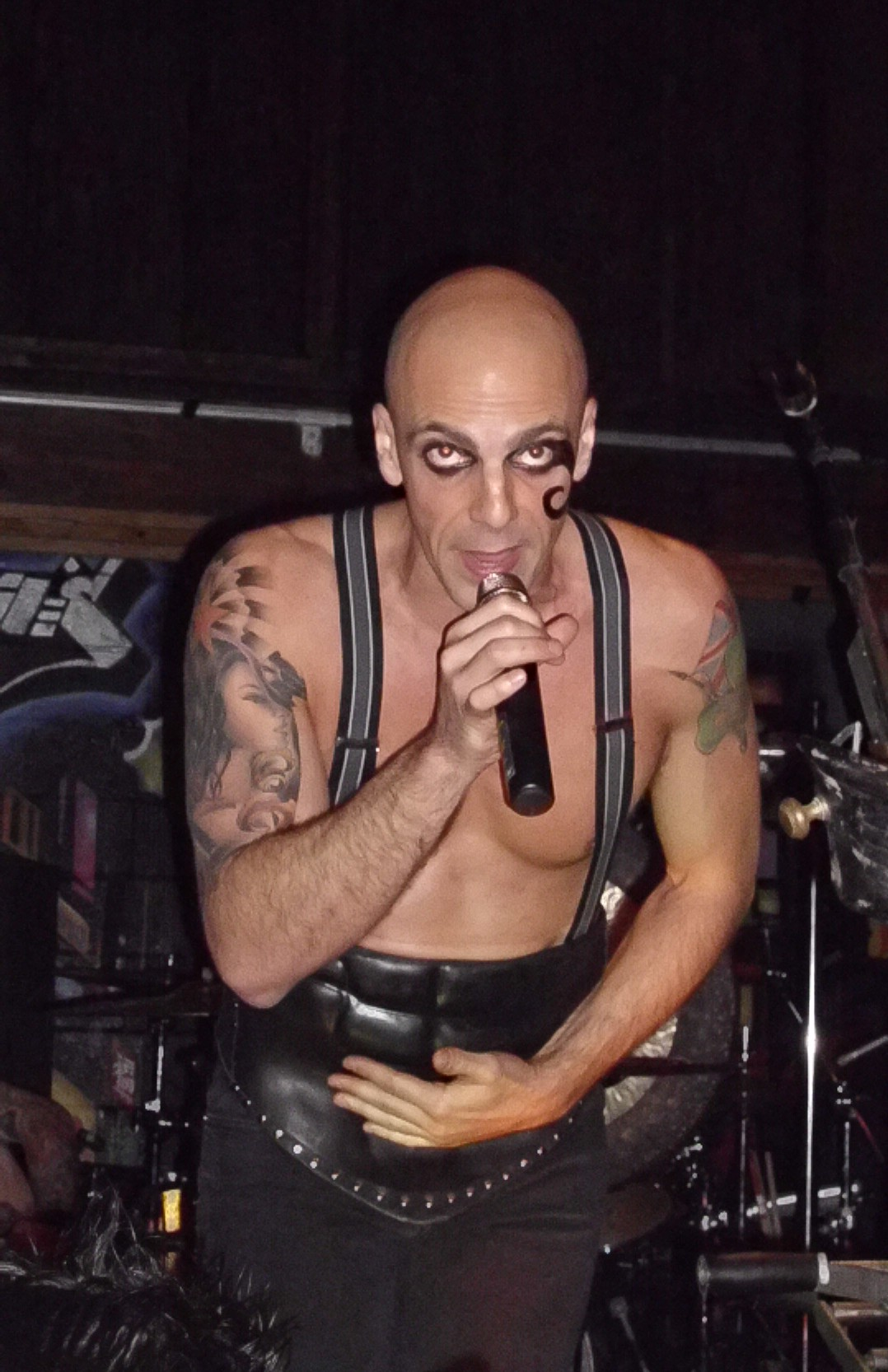

Background information
- Origin: London, England
- Genres: Alternative rock
- Years active: 2007 – present
- Members: Livan, Will Crewdson, Damon Wilson, John Robertson, David Ryder Prangley
- Website: www.livan.co.uk

LIVAN is a UK-based alternative rock band founded by Greek-born singer Livan that also features guitarist Will Crewdson (Rachel Stamp, Malcolm McLaren and Johnette Napolitano) and drummer Damon Wilson (Ray Davies, Joss Stone). The band has toured with artists like Aerosmith, Alice Cooper and Peter Murphy among others.

Greek-born Livan (aka Cosmas Livanos) is the grandson of former Greek Prime Minister Panagiotis Kanellopoulos.

== Members ==
- Livan (aka Cosmas Livanos) – vocals, guitar (2007–present)
- Will Crewdson – Lead guitar, backing vocals (2008–present)
- Jason Suttie – Keyboardist, (2007)
- John Robertson – Keyboardist, (2007–present)
- David Ryder Prangley – Bass guitar, (2007–present)
- Seven Antonopoulos – drums, (2011–present)
- Damon Wilson – drums, (2008–2011)

== Discography ==
=== Singles ===
- "Undead"
- "Life Is Smiling"
- "If Only" / "If Jesus Lived Today"
- "King of the World"
- "Happy Returns"
- "Where I Bleed"
- "Faces for the Future"

=== Studio albums ===
Democr[i]cy

- Released: 2008
- Format: CD
- Tracks: Life Is Smiling, Democricy, Once Again, No Mans Land, Crawl, If Only, If Jesus Lived Today, Undone, Stay Awake, Scars, Ride To Freedom

Happy Returns

- Released: 2009
- Format: CD
- Tracks: King of the World, Happy Returns, Kiss and Tell, Where I Bleed, Shout, When the Lights Go Down, The Machine, Underground, Still Around, Ghost, Liberated Mr. Hyde

Off The Grid (EP)

- Released: 2010
- Format: CD
- Tracks: Undead, Little White Lies, Meet Me on the Other Side, the Silence, Sad, King of the World, the Joker

Off The Grid (Extended)

- Released: 12 April 2011
- Format: CD
- Tracks: Undead, Little White Lies, Meet Me on the Other Side, the Silence, Sad, King of the World, the Joker, Where I Bleed, When The Lights Go Down, No Mans Land, Happy Returns

Beggars and Believers

- Released: 7 April 2013
- Format: MP3
- Label: Pumpkin Music
- Tracks: Obsessed, Strange, She Walks in Beauty, The Waiting Game, Anarchy, War Paint, Carousel, Beggars and Believers, Darkness, End of the World

== Reception ==
Michelle St. James (Shakefire.com) described LIVAN's music as "industrial pop punk/alt-rock" going on to say that it "sounds gritty, raw, and fun with crashing guitar and thumping bass lines". Jack Feerick (Pop Dose) said that the "Happy Returns" album was "currently rockin' my world down to a nub" and went on to describe the title track as sounding like "the Kaiser Chiefs meets The The with vocals by a slumming Peter Murphy". Rob Smy (Spinner) compared LIVAN to Placebo and Nine Inch Nails. However, Patrick Slevin (Aquarian Weekly) described LIVAN's vocals as an "acquired taste".

Writing for the Associated Press, critic Wayne Parry said "Livan defies easy categorization. His voice has the snarl of Johnny Rotten and the exaggerated bass of Iggy Pop. His shaved head evokes Rob Halford, and his stage presence evokes Freddie Mercury, clad one night in hot pink spandex and combat boots, the next in a leather fringed kilt. And he rocks."
