= Hymns for Strange Children =

Studio album by Rachel Stamp
- Released: February 21, 2000
- Recorded: 1998–2000
- Genre: Alternative rock, glam rock
- Length: 38:14
- Label: Cruisin'
- Producer: John Fryer

Rachel Stamp chronology
Hymns for Strange Children (2000)	Stampax (2000)

Singles from Hymns for Strange Children
- 1. "My Sweet Rose EP" Released: December 8, 1997; 2. "I Got the Worm" Released: June 29, 1998; 3. "I Wanna Be Your Doll" Released: March 2, 1999; 4. "Spank (single)" Released: September 20, 1999; 5. "Didn't I Break My Heart Over You" Released: February 21, 2000; 6. "Monsters of the New Wave" Released: October 2, 2000

Professional ratings
Review scores
Source	Rating
Classic Rock	7/10 marks
Encyclopedia of Popular Music	3/5 stars
Kerrang!	4/5 stars
The List	4/5 stars
Melody Maker	2/5 stars
NME	6/10
Rock Sound	3/5 stars

Hymns for Strange Children is the début album from London-based glam rockers Rachel Stamp. It was released in 2000 on Cruisin' Records. Recorded by John Fryer in as little as two weeks, Rachel Stamp's debut album was a long time in the making. After Rachel Stamp were dropped from WEA in 1997, the original debut album, Fight the Force of Evil, was in serious doubt of ever seeing a release, but the band released a string of hit independent singles, all of which appear on this album.

The album was reissued at the end of the year as a numbered Limited Edition of 1500 2-CD box set with the live album Stampax. The catalogue number was CRRS 003L.

== Track listing ==
1. Monsters of the New Wave
2. Brand New Toy
3. I Got the Worm
4. I Wanna Be Your Doll
5. Ladies + Gents
6. Spank (Katharine Blake mix)
7. Didn't I Break My Heart Over You
8. Take a Hold of Yourself
9. Pink Skab
10. Dirty Bone
11. My Sweet Rose [new version]

=== Limited edition track listing ===
CD1: Hymns for Strange Children [repackaged]

1. Monsters Of The New Wave
2. Brand New Toy
3. I Got the Worm
4. I Wanna Be Your Doll
5. Ladies+Gents [listed on the back of the album as 'Ladies & Gents']
6. Spank [Katherine Blake mix]
7. Didn't I Break My Heart Over You
8. Take a Hold of Yourself
9. Pink Skab
10. Dirty Bone
11. My Sweet Rose [new version]

CD2: Stampax

1. Brand New Toy
2. Dead Girl
3. Tammy Machine
4. True Love
5. Madonna... Cher...
6. Queen Bee
7. Black Tambourine [listed on the back of the album as 'Black Tamborine']
8. Feel Like Makin’ Love
9. I Like Girlz [listed on the back of the album as 'Like Girlz']
10. Girl You're Just a Slave to Your Man
11. Hey Hey Michael You're Really Fantastic
12. Je Suis Maisee
13. n.a.u.s.e.a

== Charts ==
Chart performance for Hymns for Strange Children
Chart (2000)	Peak Position
UK Independent Albums (OCC)	23
UK Albums (OCC)	127
