= Spearmint (band) =

English indie pop band

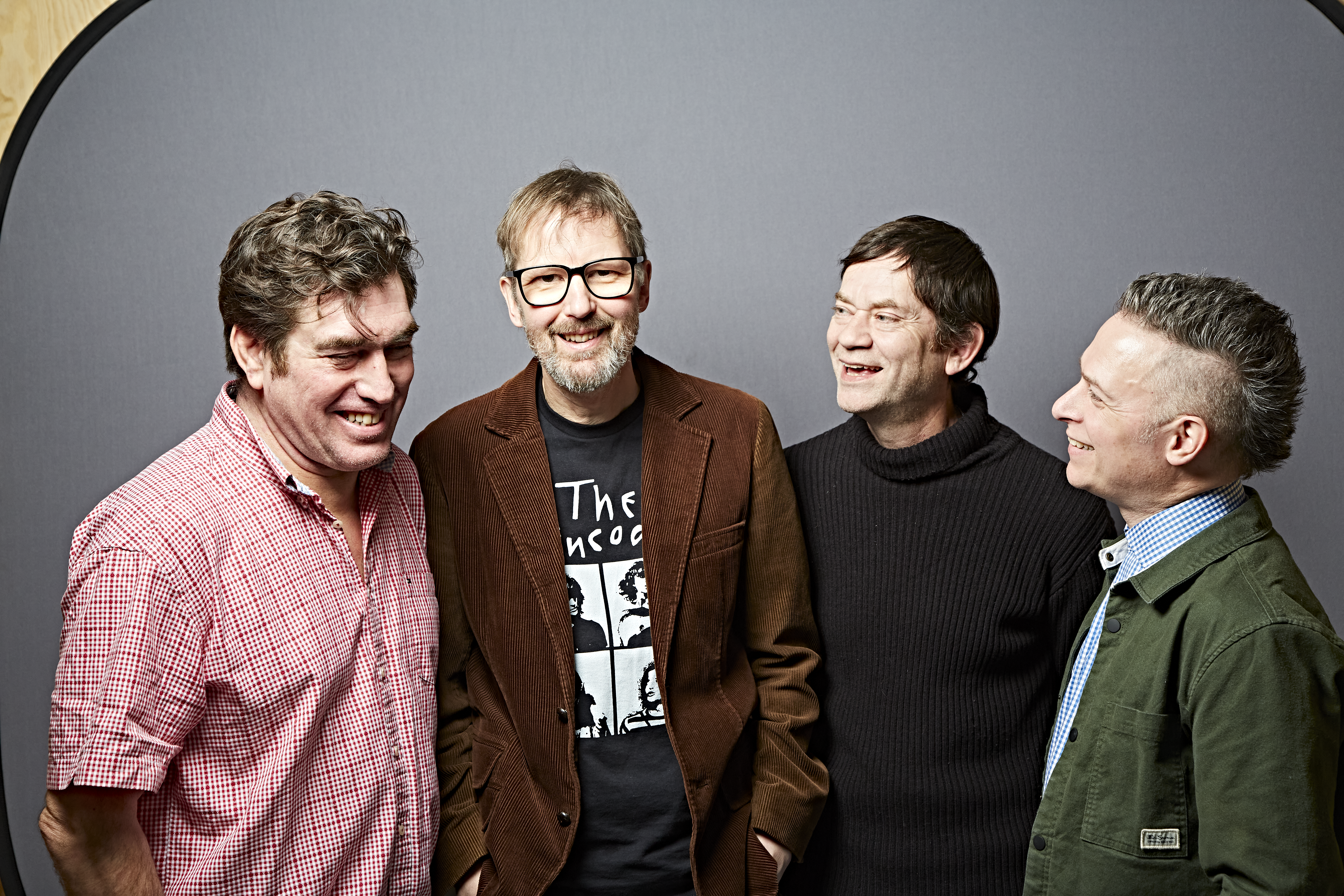

Background information
- Origin: London, England
- Genres: Indie pop, post-Britpop
- Years active: 1995–present
- Label: hitBACK
- Members: Shirley Lee; Simon Calnan; James Parsons; Ronan Larvor
- Past members: Martin Talbot; Dickon Edwards; Andy Lewis

Spearmint are a London-based independent band founded in 1995, comprising Shirley Lee (guitar, singing), Simon Calnan (keyboards, singing), James Parsons (guitar, bass) and Ronan Larvor (drums).

Original bassist Martin Talbot left the band after five shows, being replaced by Parsons in September 1995. Following Talbot's death, the band dedicated their debut album A Week Away to him in 1999. The dedication was repeated in 2009 when a 10th anniversary edition of the album was issued, including a new seven-song-cycle 'Life In Reverse', also in memory of Talbot.

All the group's records have been released on their own 'hitBACK' label, enabling them to maintain control over their artistic output. Most recent album 'Holland Park' is the 57th release on the label.

The band have worked together continuously since 1995, even while Parsons released a side project by Telley in 2009, and Lee released a solo double-album in 2011. At various times, the group has also been aided by Dickon Edwards, Andy Lewis and Rhodri Marsden.

The group has received coverage in the NME, Time Out, Melody Maker and Uncut magazines. and were referenced in the film (500) Days of Summer wherein Joseph Gordon-Levitt's character states “It pains me we live in a world where nobody's heard of Spearmint.”

In 2009, Image Comics of Berkeley, California released the book 'This Is A Souvenir', a collection of graphic novellas based on the songs of Spearmint and Shirley Lee.

Spearmint released their tenth album 'This Candle Is For You' in late 2023. The album was very positive received critically, with Mojo placing it at number 53 in their Top 100 albums of 2023.

== Album discography ==
Studio albums

- A Week Away (1999)
- Oklahoma (2000)
- A Different Lifetime (2001)
- My Missing Days (2003)
- The Boy and the Girl That Got Away (2005)
- Paris in a Bottle (2006)
- A Week Away re-issue including Life In Reverse (2009)
- News from Nowhere (2014)
- It's Time to Vanish (2016)
- Are You from the Future? (2019)
- Holland Park (2021)
- This Candle Is For You (2023)
- Chase Me (2026)

Compilation albums

- Songs for the Colour Yellow (1998)
- A Leopard and Other Stories (2004)

Side projects

- Shirley Lee: s/t (2005)
- Telley: Now I'm The Big Sister (2009)
- Shirley Lee: Winter, Autumn, Summer, Spring (2011)
