= Orlando (band) =

English musical group

- Origin: England
- Genre: Romo
- Years active: 1993–2000
- Label: Blanco y Negro
- Past members: Dickon Edwards; Tim Chipping; Neil Turner; Mike Austen; David Gray

Orlando (styled Orlando) were an English Romo band of the 1990s. They were one of seven core Romo acts featured by Melody Maker in their guide to the Romo scene and were subsequently cited as being "figureheads" of the scene. As well as substantial coverage in Melody Maker, the band also received press coverage from the NME, Select Smash Hits and Penthouse UK.

The band consisted of Dickon Edwards, Tim Chipping, Neil Turner, Mike Austen and David Gray. Musically, Orlando combined the synthesised dance-pop of 1990s boybands and American swingbeat acts with verbose lyrics in the general style of Morrissey and Richey Edwards.

== Career ==
Orlando first played live on the London indie circuit as a generic alternative rock band in 1993–1994. They later withdrew from the scene to reinvent themselves as an "alienated" white soul duo consisting of Chipping and Edwards plus sidemen Turner and Austen. In early 1995, they issued the EP Reproduction Is Pollution under the name Shelley on Sarah Records. The band approached founding Romo clubnight Club Skinny in Camden to relaunch themselves as a live act. David Gray, synth programmer for fellow Romo band Hollywood (and formerly their drummer in their previous incarnation as punk trio Xerox Girls) later become Orlando's live drummer while Club Skinny co-promoter Paul "Hi Fi" Nugent became the band's manager.

In March 1996, the band's song "Nature's Hated" was included in Melody Maker's covermount cassette Fiddling While Romo Burns and a single track CD was put on sale at dates of the similarly named Romo package tour in which Orlando participated. In the summer of that year Orlando released their first single, "Just for a Second." In Autumn of that year they released the Magic EP which achieved No. 96 on the UK Singles Chart. A new version of "Nature's Hated", the group's third single, was released in 1997, and they also contributed a cover of Tim Hardin's "How Can We Hang on to a Dream" to the soundtrack of the film Fever Pitch.

In September 1997, the band released their album, Passive Soul, through the label Blanco y Negro. It made both the Melody Maker and Gay Times albums of the year list The album is now hard to find and commands upwards of £30 on the collectors market.

Shortly after the release of the album, Edwards left the band to form Fosca, who released three albums between 2000 and 2008. Chipping took over as lyricist and the new Orlando recorded a second album Sick Folk with a new folk music sound. Orlando disbanded in spring 2000 with the album still unreleased. In 2002, Chipping uploaded six songs from Sick Folk to his own website.

Chipping later embarked on an acting career; his credits included playing a gay Star Trek fan, in cosplay as Mr Spock, in the BBC comedy series Little Britain. In 2012, in his capacity as Music Editor of the website Holy Moly, Chipping was appointed as a Pundit by the BBC for their Sound of 2012.

== Discography ==
Orlando discography
- Studio albums: 1
- Singles: 5
- Music videos: 3

The discography of Orlando consists of one studio album, five singles/EPs, three music videos and one original appearance on another release.

An out-takes compilation and part of an unreleased second studio album have been made available posthumously as downloads.

=== Album ===
- Passive Soul, Blanco Y Negro (1997)
1. "Introduction"
2. "Furthest Point Away"
3. "Just For A Second"
4. "Nature's Hated"
5. "On Dry Land"
6. "Contained"
7. "Afraid Again"
8. "Happily Unhappy"
9. "Don't Sleep Alone"
10. "Save Yourself"
11. "Three Letters"
12. "Here (So Find Me)"
13. "Hero" (bonus track - acoustic version)

=== Singles/EPs ===
- Reproduction Is Pollution EP (credited as Shelley), Sarah Records (1995)
1. "Reproduction Is Pollution"
2. "Prejudice"
3. "Hero" (original full band version)
- "Nature's Hated" (tour promotional single) (1996)
1. "Nature's Hated" (first version)
- "Just for a Second", Blanco Y Negro (1996)
1. "Just For A Second"
2. "Something To Write Home About"
3. "The Trouble With You" (interview with backing music)
- The Magic EP, Blanco Y Negro (1996) - UK No. 96
1. "Don't Kill My Rage"
2. "Fatal"
3. "Contained"
4. "Up Against It"
- "Nature's Hated", Blanco Y Negro (1997)
1. "Nature's Hated"
2. "Someday Soon"
3. "You've Got The Answer Wrong"
4. "Nature's Hated" (first version)

=== Downloads ===
- Sick Folk (selected tracks from unreleased second album of same name)
1. "Out of Harm's Way"
2. "Where I'm from's Not Where I'm Going"
3. "Where Will It All End?"
4. "I'm Alright"
5. "So Often the Way"
6. "Free"
- Some Debris from the Orlando Vaults (Passive Soul-era rarities)
1. "Don't Sleep Alone" (GLR session)
2. "Reach Out for Me" (BFBS session)
3. "Acetone"
4. "A Life's Aside"
5. "Sidelined Youth"
6. "The Theme from Orlando" (live concert introduction tape)
7. Radio One Newsbeat interview

=== Compilation appearances ===
- Fiddling While Romo Burns (compilation cassette included with Melody Maker 9 March 1996)
1. "Nature's Hated" (first version)

Also includes tracks by Plastic Fantastic, DexDexTer, Hollywood and Viva

- The Fever Pitch EP soundtrack, Blanco Y Negro (1997) - UK No. 65
1. "How Can We Hang On to a Dream?"

Also includes tracks by the Pretenders, the La's and Nick Hornby

== Videography ==
=== Music videos ===
Year	Song	Director	Notes	Sources
1995	"Prejudice"		Filmed on the set of Top of the Pops	
1996	"Just for a Second"	Eric Watson		
1996	"Don't Kill My Rage"	Eric Watson		

=== Video press kit ===
Orlando - A Popumentary 1995

== Concert tours ==
=== Headlining ===
- Fiddling While Romo Burns: Club Skinny/Arcadia on the March joint tour with Plastic Fantastic, Hollywood and DexDexTer, plus Viva on London LA2 date, rotating running order, March 1996, 10 dates

(An Orlando headline tour was booked for early 1997 but cancelled due to logistical issues. Support band Acacia nonetheless completed the schedule of bookings, upgraded to headline act.)

=== Opening act ===
- Kenickie UK tours September–October 1996, January–February 1997
