= Dickon Edwards =

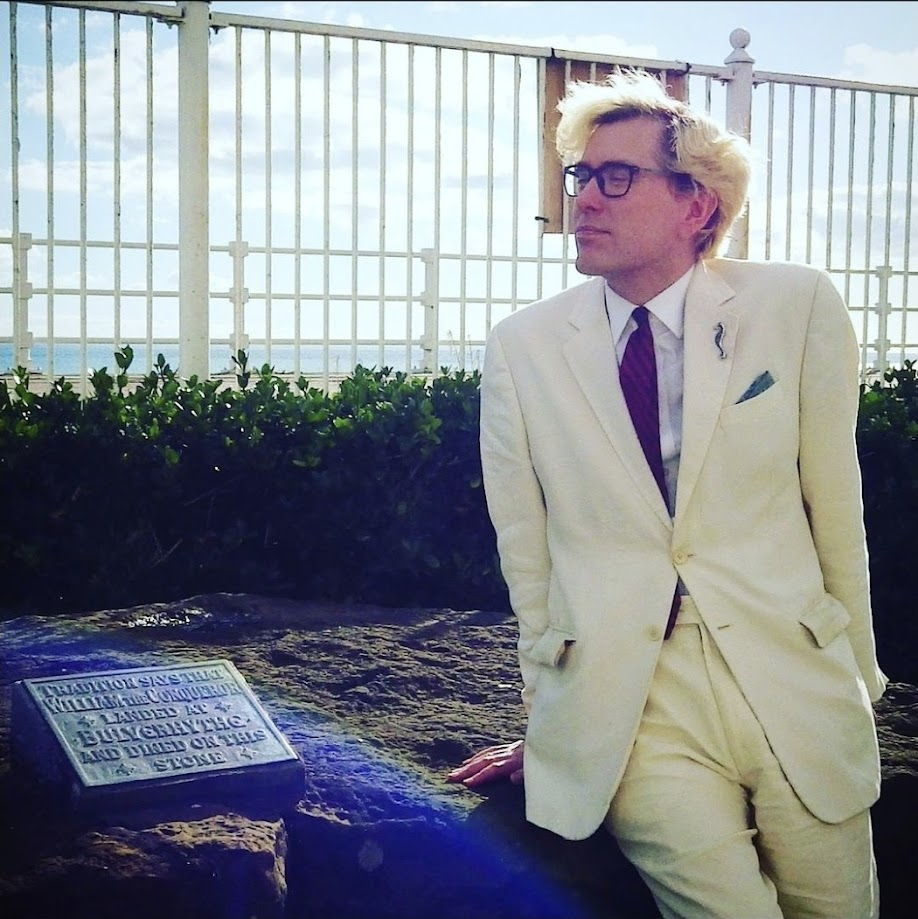

Background information
- Also known as: Dickon Angel
- Born: Richard Edwards; 3 September 1971 (age 55); Ipswich, Suffolk, England
- Genre: Indie pop
- Occupations: Musician, Writer
- Instruments: Vocals, guitar
- Formerly of: Shelley, Orlando, Fosca, Spearmint, Scarlet's Well
- Website: dickonedwards.com

Dickon Edwards (born Richard Edwards; 3 September 1971), also known as Dickon Angel, is a St Leonards-on-Sea-based indie pop musician and diarist.

He was a founding member of the bands Orlando and Fosca, and briefly played guitar in the band Spearmint. He also wrote the lyrics for a song on the Scarlet's Well album Black Tulip Wings, 'Narcissus in the Maze'.

He has kept a blog called The Diary at the Centre of the Earth since 8 December 1997 (predating the 1999 coining of the term "blog" - he terms it an "online diary"). Excerpts from the blog were included in Travis Elborough and Nick Rennison's A London Year the follow-up title A Traveller's Year, Our History of the 20th Century, and Bus Fare and the blog was also featured in an edition of the BBC1 arts programme Imagine. In May 2017, it was recognised as the UK’s longest running web diary by the Centre for Life-Writing Research at King’s College London, as part of their exhibition Dear Diary.

In September 2004 he wrote the afterword for a new edition of Jerome K. Jerome's The Idle Thoughts of an Idle Fellow.

In September 2007, he contributed an account of his first trip to Tangier with Shane MacGowan, plus a set-list from his club night Beautiful & Damned, plus a photo of himself with Anne Pigalle, walking a lobster in homage to the French poet Gérard de Nerval, to The Decadent Handbook, edited by Rowan Pelling.

In March 2008 he released a printed collection of lyrics titled The Portable Dickon Edwards, which was released in a limited edition alongside Fosca's The Painted Side of the Rocket album.

Edwards was one of 57 modern dandies featured in the 2013 book by Rose Callahan (photographs) and Nathaniel 'Natty' Adams (words) I Am Dandy: The Return of the Elegant Gentleman.

In 2021, Edwards completed a PhD on Ronald Firbank and the Legacy of Camp Modernism at Birkbeck College, University of London.

In October 2025 a collection of Edwards' diary entries from 1997 to 2007, edited by Robert Wringham and with an introduction by Travis Elborough, was published by P & H Books, entitled Diary at the Centre of the Earth. Vol. I. The book also contained 'supplementary material' in the form of magazine articles and interviews, together with 2025 annotations.

In June 2026 he wrote the foreword to Jules Scheele's graphic novel adaptation of Virginia Woolf's Orlando.

== Personal life ==
Known for his dandy aesthetic, Dickon has peroxide blond hair and is often seen in a white, blue, or silver-grey three-piece suit, the silver-grey suit being a bequest from fellow London dandy Sebastian Horsley. Edwards is a son of the quiltmaker and author Lynne Edwards MBE, and the cartoonist Brian "Bib" Edwards. His brother was the Adam Ant guitarist, Tom Edwards.
