= Stampax =

Live album by Rachel Stamp
- Released: 1 September 2000
- Recorded: 2000
- Genre: Alternative rock, glam rock
- Length: 44:10
- Label: Cruisin' Records
- Producer: Gareth Parton, Max Bisgrove

Rachel Stamp chronology
'Hymns for Strange Children' (2000)	Stampax (2000)	'Oceans of Venus' (2002)

Singles from Stampax
- 1. "Hey Hey Michael You're Really Fantastic... Live!" Released: 15 May 2000

Stampax is a live album by the English glam rock band Rachel Stamp. It was recorded during the band's 2000 Hymns for Strange Children tour and released on 1 September 2000 on Cruisin' Records.

== Background ==
Stampax was originally intended to be a live recording of just one gig from the Hymns for Strange Children tour, but due to the demand from fans for more rare material, the band recorded other gigs for the album. Another title proposed for the album was Old Enough to Bleed.

Originally issued as an “Internet Only and Mail Order” release that was only available through the official Rachel Stamp website, Stampax wasn’t issued to stores as a single CD until late September 2002. The album was also released as a special bonus CD with the limited-edition version of Hymns For Strange Children. It is currently out of print.

Stampax was mastered and edited by Max Bisgrove, who had previously worked with David Bowie and Iggy Pop.

== Track listing ==
1. Brand New Toy
2. Dead Girl
3. Tammy Machine
4. True Love
5. Madonna... Cher...
6. Queen Bee
7. Black Tambourine
8. Feel Like Makin’ Love
9. I Like Girlz
10. Girl You’re Just A Slave To Your Man
11. Hey Hey Michael You’re Really Fantastic
12. Je Suis Maisee
13. n.a.u.s.e.a

The live album features an original take on Bad Company’s “Feel Like Makin’ Love”.

Live outtakes from the album can be found as B-Sides to the "Hey Hey Michael You're Really Fantastic...Live!" CD single and "Monsters of the New Wave" CD and 7" Vinyl singles. These include live versions of "I Got The Worm", "Spank", an early version of "Black Cherry" and a cover of Johnny Kidd and the Pirates' "Please Don't Touch".
