= Fosca (band) =

British band

- Origin: London, England
- Genres: Electro/Indie pop (2000–2008) indie pop/C86 (music) (1998–1999) hard rock (1997–1998)
- Years active: 1997 - 2009
- Labels: But Is it Art? (2007–2009); Shinkansen Records (2000–2002); Something Velvet Records (1999); Bluefire Records (1998)
- Members: Dickon Edwards; Rachel Stevenson; Tom Edwards; Kate Dornan
- Past members: Alex Sharkey; Sheila B Charley Stone; Sav; Peter Theobalds; David Gray
- Website: Official website

Fosca was a British band, combining indie pop songwriting with synthpop instrumentation. Initially, the band was formed by bassist Peter Theobalds and Orlando guitarist/lyricist Dickon Edwards (later guitarist for Spearmint) plus Orlando drummer David Gray, before settling into being a vehicle for Edwards and his songs. Over the next decade, Edwards fronted several (predominantly female) lineups of the band including guitarist Charley Stone (formerly of Gay Dad and later of The Priscillas). They released a total of three studio albums between 2000-2008. The band was named after the protagonist in Stephen Sondheim's Passion based upon the translation of Lawrence Venuti of the novel Fosca by Iginio Ugo Tarchetti, 1869. They received press coverage from The Independent.

== History ==
The original version of Fosca was founded in the summer of 1997 as a hard rock side project by Dickon Edwards, then concurrently the guitarist and lyricist for the Romo band Orlando, together with Orlando's live drummer David Gray and a bass player named Peter Theobalds. Edwards recruited laddish lead vocalist Sav in what he would later describe as "an experiment of the Laddish Lion lying down with the Limp-wristed Lamb.". This line-up performed five concerts between September 1997 and February 1998 - the first two predating Dickon's final appearance with Orlando, which he left to concentrate on Fosca. The final concert featured Charley Stone as guest guitarist.

They also recorded four tracks for a putative EP, one of which, The Leopard Of Lime Street would, later in 1998, feature on a volume of the sampler album series "Snakebite City" on Bluefire Records. In February 1998, Dickon removed Sav from the band as he felt the singer, "through not being an immediately apparent misfit, with consummate irony didn’t fit in Fosca." Initially, David Barnett, the future Suede biographer auditioned to replace Sav, however by April 1998 Theobalds and Gray had drifted away to a new band Akercocke, while Stone was otherwise committed to the band Gay Dad.

After several months of inactivity, a new version of Fosca debuted on Friday 25 September 1998 at Queeruption in London. From this point forward, Dickon himself became the frontman for the band. For the first show, the band included seven members, while the next, on New Year's Eve 1998, featured only three. In early 1999, Fosca made their first attempt at recording debut album On Earth To Make The Numbers Up at Riverside Studios in Hammersmith, London. This was eventually aborted after the budget ran out and one track, Storytelling Johnny was accidentally wiped by the DAT recording machine. However, one track from these sessions, File Under Forsaken, would later be released as the lead track for Fosca's debut single Nervous, London along with two additional tracks featuring Rachel Stevenson on folk-style lead vocals.

The remaining eight songs for the album were rerecorded in 2000 with a new synth-based sound not dissimilar to that of Orlando, and released, still under the title On Earth To Make The Numbers Up, and preceded by the single The Agony Without the Ecstasy on Shinkansen Recordings (an offshoot of Sarah Records who in early 1995 had released the Reproduction Is Pollution EP by Orlando under the alternative name Shelley). By this time, the band had stabilized into Dickon Edwards on vocals and guitar, Rachel Stevenson on keyboards and vocals, Alex Sharkey also on keyboards and vocals and Sheila B on cello. In 2001 the band released Supine On The Astroturf as the first single from their second album. By the time follow-up single Secret Crush On Third Trombone and the parent album Diary Of An Antibody were recorded and released in 2002, Sharkey had been replaced by Kate Dornan, formerly the editor of Orlando website Orlando Magic.

After a gap of some six years due to the collapse of Shinkansen, Fosca signed with the Swedish independent record label But Is It Art?, on which they released a live album in 2007, followed by their third studio album The Painted Side of the Rocket in Sweden on 5 March 2008. UK release on 28 April. The label also released a book of Dickon's lyrics for Fosca and Orlando, The Portable Dickon Edwards. Lyrics and Other Alibis 1993-2008. By then, the current line-up was Dickon Edwards on vocals and guitar, Rachel Stevenson on keyboards and vocals, Kate Dornan on keyboards and vocals, Dickon's brother Tom Edwards on guitar and former member Charley Stone returning to perform live on guitar. A further single, "The Man I'm Not Today" / "My Diogenes Heart" was released later in 2008. Dickon disbanded Fosca in March 2009, with the final concert being at Klubb Republik in Norrköping, Sweden on 14 March.

Tom Edwards died January 24, 2017 while touring as guitarist for Adam Ant in whose band he had played since 2011.

== Discography ==
=== Studio albums ===
- On Earth to Make the Numbers Up (Shrinkhansen, 2000)
- Diary of an Antibody (Shrinkhansen, 2002)
- The Painted Side of the Rocket (But Is It Art?, 2008)

=== Live albums ===
- Fosca in Concert (But Is It Art?, 2007)

=== EPs ===
- Nervous, London (Something Velvet, 1999)
- The Agony Without the Ecstasy (Shrinkhansen, 2000)
- Supine on the Astroturf (Shrinkhansen, 2001)
- Secret Crush on the Third Trombone (Shrinkhansen, 2002)
- The Man I'm Not Today (But Is It Art?, 2008)

=== Compilations ===
- Snakebite City (Bluefire, 1998)
  - 1.The Leopard of Lime Street
