= Now I'm Nailed to Your Bedroom Wall, I've Only Got Myself to Blame =

Compilation album by Rachel Stamp
- Released: April 27, 2009
- Recorded: Between 1996 and 2004
- Genre: Alternative rock, glam rock
- Length: 71:02
- Label: Serena/Cargo Records
- Producer: Dave Eringa, Rachel Stamp, Bobby Nolan, John Fryer & Roger Tebutt

Rachel Stamp chronology
Sweet Shop (2004)	Now I'm Nailed to Your Bedroom Wall, I've Only Got Myself to Blame (2009)

Professional ratings
Review scores
Source	Rating
Rock Sound	8/10 stars

Now I'm Nailed to Your Bedroom Wall, I've Only Got Myself to Blame is a compilation album by London-based glam rockers Rachel Stamp. It was released in April 2009 via Serena/Cargo Records. The album takes its name from the lyrics of the Rachel Stamp song, "Pink Skab".

== The Album ==
Released April 27, 2009 on CD & Digital Download (SRCD 9001)

== Track listing ==
The tracks chosen for the compilation were selected by David Ryder-Prangley. The album was mixed, edited and mastered by Drew Richards with sleeve notes written by Simon Price. Originally, the album was to be released with a bonus DVD, but after reviewing the material, the band have decided to release the DVD separately later this year. The album features many rare tracks such as "Dead Girl" (which was only available on a free CD given away with Kerrang! magazine and the band's Sweet Shop compilation CD) and "Every Night I Pray for the Bomb" (which was only available on the "Bring Me the Head of Rachel Stamp EP")

=== CD version ===
1. Black Cherry (album version)
2. Queen of the Universe
3. Dead Girl
4. Hey Hey Michael You're Really Fantastic (single edit)
5. My Sweet Rose (single version)
6. I Like Girlz
7. I Got the Worm
8. Do Me In Once and I'll Be Sad, Do Me In Twice and I'll Know Better (radio edit)
9. Black Tambourine
10. Monsters of the New Wave
11. True Love
12. Twisted
13. Les Oceans De Venus
14. I Wanna Be Your Doll
15. Every Night I Pray for the Bomb
16. Pink Skab
17. Jet Black Supersonic
18. Stealing Clothes From Shelley Barrett
19. Witches of Angelholm
20. Didn't I Break My Heart Over You (radio edit)

=== Digital download ===
The digital download version of the album replaces "Hey Hey Michael You're Really Fantastic" and "Every Night I Pray for the Bomb" with "Home Made Sex Change" and "Creeps". "Home Made Sex Change" was given away as a free download on the band's official website in 2002 and "Creeps" was available as a free track on a Metal Hammer compilation CD, given away with a copy of the magazine in November, 2004.

1. Black Cherry (album version)
2. Queen of the Universe
3. Dead Girl
4. My Sweet Rose (single version)
5. I Like Girlz
6. I Got the Worm
7. Do Me In Once and I'll Be Sad, Do Me In Twice and I'll Know Better (radio edit)
8. Black Tambourine
9. Monsters of the New Wave
10. True Love
11. Twisted
12. Les Oceans De Venus
13. I Wanna Be Your Doll
14. Pink Skab
15. Jet Black Supersonic
16. Stealing Clothes from Shelley Barrett
17. Witches of Angelholm
18. Didn't I Break My Heart Over You (radio edit)
19. Home Made Sex Change
20. Creeps

== Production and promotions ==
To promote the release, Rachel Stamp reformed for a sold out, one off show at the O2 Islington Academy, London on April 10, 2009.
