= Know Me (Frankie Rose song) =

Single by Frankie Rose

from the album Interstellar
- Released: 2012
- Genre: Indie-pop, rock
- Length: 2:53
- Label: Slumberland, Memphis Industries

Frankie Rose singles chronology
"Thee Only One" (2009)	"Know Me" (2012)

"Know Me" is a song by American musician Frankie Rose. It was the leading single of the album Interstellar and was also released as part of an eponymous EP. It was track 2 of the album. A music video for the song was published in July 2012. Reviews from DIY and Pitchfork noted the use of reverb on Rose's vocals and drew comparisons to The Cure. Consequence of Sound, DIY, and NME likened the guitar sound to that of Johnny Marr.
