= Sumerian Kyngs =

- Origin: Brighton, UK
- Genres: Psychedelic Space rock Jam Groove
- Years active: 2004-present
- Labels: 2 Right Records
- Members: Steve Cartwright (tenor sax/vocals); Monty Oxymoron (keyboards/percussion); Andy Baynton-Power (bass guitar); Stuart McKay (harmonicas); Cliff Dowding (synthesizers/lights); Trevor Nobes (guitar); Graham Durrant (drums); Joe Loughrell (vocals)
- Past members: Ross Clifford (vocals/guitar); Tony Green d. May 2021 (vocals); Marc Jenner d. Nov 2011 (drums); Richard Lanchester (drums/percussion); Dave Berk (drums) Phil Boucherat (alto sax); Eva Thompson (sitar); The Hobbit (accordion); Mickey Wynne (guitars); Simon Myers (drums)

The Sumerian Kyngs are an eight piece British space rock band. They are best known for their pounding live performances, layered instrumentation and laser light shows.

== History ==
Founded in Brighton in 2004 by Ross Clifford (vocals and guitar), Steve Cartwright (tenor sax), Phil Boucherat (alto sax), Simon Myers (drums) and The Damned's Monty Oxymoron (keyboards and percussion), the Sumerian Kyngs debuted at the Marlborough Theatre, Brighton, for the Real Music Club.

Constantly experimenting, the band has undergone many line-up changes over the years. After Marc Jenner (drums) replaced Myers in 2006, the band expanded its line-up, recruiting Andy Baynton-Power (bass), Stuart McKay (harmonicas), Eva Thompson (sitar), Mickey Wynne (guitars) and The Hobbit (accordion). Boucherat and Thompson left in 2007 and Cliff Dowding (synthesizers and lighting) joined in 2008. Jenner left in 2009 due to ill health and was replaced by Richard Lanchester (drums).

In 2010 Clifford, Wynne and The Hobbit left the band to pursue separate creative interests. They were replaced by Tony Green (vocals) and Trevor Nobes (guitar). Dave Berk (drums), a founder member of Johnny Moped, replaced Lanchester in 2014.

The Sumerian Kyngs then signed with Brighton label 2 Right Records and made their first studio album, Post Art Pop Offensive. Due to the revival of Johnny Moped, Berk left shortly after and was replaced by Graham Durrant (drums), formerly of 14 Iced Bears.

Tony Green died in May 2021. Joe Loughrell (of the Noir Mates and Eggtimer) took over vocals duties in early 2022.

The Sumerian Kyngs gig regularly in the Brighton area and have appeared at many festivals - including Kozfest and Beautiful Days.

== Robert Rankin connection ==
In the Robert Rankin novel Necrophenia, the main character, Tyler, fronts a boy-band with the similar name the Sumerian Kynges. The author has admitted that he saw a Sumerian Kyngs poster displayed in a Brighton pub and decided to adapt and use the name. He has since met the Sumerian Kyngs and they played twice at parties he threw, including his 60th birthday party.

== The Real Music Club ==
The Sumerian Kyngs are regular performers and contributors to the Real Music Club in Brighton.

== Discography ==
1. One Nice Little EP (2009) Limited edition EP, Privately released.
2. Ziggurat Battery (2012) Privately released.
3. Fiat Tagliero (2013) Privately released.
4. Post Art Pop Offensive (2015) 2 Right Records.

== See also ==
- The Damned (band)
- Monty Oxymoron
- Robert Rankin
- Johnny Moped
- 14 Iced Bears
