= Veronica Falls (album) =

Studio album by Veronica Falls
- Released: 20 September 2011
- Recorded: 2009–2011
- Length: 36:27
- Label: Slumberland, Bella Union
- Producer: Veronica Falls

Singles from Veronica Falls
- 1. "Found Love in a Graveyard" Released: 9 February 2011; 2. "Beachy Head" Released: 21 September 2011; 3. "Bad Feeling" Released: 30 August 2011

Veronica Falls is the debut album by English indie pop band Veronica Falls. The album was released on September 20, 2011, in the United States through Slumberland Records, and in the European Union through Bella Union.

== History ==
In 2010, Veronica Falls released two singles - "Found Love in a Graveyard" and "Beachy Head" - on the American label Captured Tracks.

After releasing their first two singles, the band released their self-titled debut album in September 2011 on Slumberland Records in the United States and Bella Union in the European Union, to generally favorable reviews. The album was recorded with veteran producer Guy Fixsen. The album was followed by a single, "Bad Feeling", in August 2011.

== Reception ==
Professional ratings
Aggregate scores
Source	Rating
Metacritic	71/100
Review scores
Source	Rating
AllMusic	5/5 stars
Clash	7/10
Drowned in Sound	9/10
The Fly	4/5 stars
The Guardian	3/5 stars
NME	6/10
Pitchfork	7.7/10
PopMatters	8/10
Q	3/5 stars
Spin	7/10

Veronica Falls received positive reviews from music critics. At Metacritic, which assigns a normalized rating out of 100 to reviews from mainstream critics, the album received an average score of 71 based on 19 reviews, indicating "generally favourable reviews". AllMusic critic Tim Sendra wrote that Veronica Falls "sounds effortless and truly organic in the best sense of the word, like four people blending together to make one perfectly formed sound." Dom Gourlay of Drowned in Sound called it "an album with no discernible weak links", noting that "the final quarter is where Veronica Falls finds itself elevated alongside 2011's best." Now's Joanne Huffa wrote that despite the songs' "effortlessly crafted" sound, "there's a complexity to the melodies and structures that surprises on repeat listens." Pitchfork's Lindsay Zoladz noted "a striking physicality to these songs, and Guy Fixsen and Ash Workman's production makes every tambourine beat hit with the clarity of a shattering window." Jon Caramanica of The New York Times wrote, "The boy-girl harmonies on this album at least suggest the possibility of outside points of view, but really, Ms. Clifford's tension is everything."

Consequence of Sound's Andy Morgan concluded that while the album's "sense of restraint feels deliberate, it does raise hopes that the band will fully go off the deep end the next time around. Nevertheless, Veronica Falls is an overall engaging album of contrasts." Ben Hewitt of BBC Music wrote that "Despite the odd patch of fluffier filler, it's still filled with enough dark delights to send tingles up and down your spine." Barry Nicolson of NME was more reserved in his praise and wrote that while Veronica Falls are "a hard band to fall in love with, this record is ridiculously easy to admire." Helen Clarke of MusicOMH felt that the band "have carved into a niche that will always have a small but loyal following which will baffle those on the outside. Newcomers would do well to do their homework first, and enjoy this debut with a thousand points of reference."

Veronica Falls was placed at number six in Rough Trade's year-end list of the best albums of 2011.

== Track listing ==
No.	Title	Length
1.	"Found Love in a Graveyard"	3:59
2.	"Right Side of My Brain"	2:52
3.	"The Fountain"	3:22
4.	"Misery"	3:45
5.	"Bad Feeling"	3:09
6.	"Stephen"	2:26
7.	"Beachy Head"	2:34
8.	"All Eyes on You"	3:10
9.	"The Box"	2:01
10.	"Wedding Day"	1:58
11.	"Veronica Falls"	2:38
12.	"Come on Over"	4:33
Total length:		36:27

== Chart positions ==
Chart (2011)	Peak position
UK Albums Chart	150

== Tour Dates ==
Tour dates confirmed by the band official website

Date	City	Country	Venue
27 October 2011	London	United Kingdom	Barfly
4 November 2011	Ghent	Belgium	Democrazy
5 November 2011	Hamburg	Germany	Molotw
6 November 2011	Berlin	Germany	Roter Salon
8 November 2011	Paris	France	Le Point Ephemere
10 November 2011	Luxembourg	France	EXIT07
11 November 2011	Amsterdam	Netherlands	London Calling
13 November 2011*	Manchester	United Kingdom	FAC 251
14 November 2011*	Newcastle	United Kingdom	The Cluny
15 November 2011*	Leeds	United Kingdom	Brudenell
16 November 2011*	Wrexham	Wales	Central Station
17 November 2011*	London	United Kingdom	ULU
23 November 2011	Barcelona	Spain	Primavera Club
24 November 2011	Madrid	Spain	Primavera Club
8 December 2011^	London	United Kingdom	The Lexington
16 December 2011	Stockholm	Sweden	Debaser Slussen

(*) These shows featured with Dum Dum Girls
(^) This show featured with Wild Flag

== Personnel ==
Additional credits confirmed by Allmusic:

Veronica Falls

- Roxanne Clifford - lead vocals, guitar
- Patrick Doyle - drums, vocals
- Marion Herbain - bass guitar
- James Hoare - guitar, vocals

Production

- Engineering - Ash Workman, Simon Trout, Guy Fixsen
- Mastering - Guy Davie
- Mixing - Ash Workman, Woodie Taylor
- Vocal Engineer - Charlie Alex March
