= Red (EP) =

EP by Weekend
- Released: September 20th, 2011
- Recorded: Summer 2011 at Function 8 Studios - San Francisco, California
- Genres: Indie rock, post-punk, noise pop
- Length: 21:52
- Label: Slumberland Records
- Producers: Monte Vallier and Weekend

Weekend chronology
Sports (2010)	Red (2011)	Jinx (2013)

Professional ratings
Review scores
Source	Rating
Allmusic	4/5 stars
Pitchfork Media	(7.4/10)
Drowned In Sound	(8/10)
Consequence of Sound	4/5 stars
PopMatters	(5/10)

Red is the second EP by the band Weekend. The EP was released on September 20, 2011, from Slumberland Records.

== Release ==
Slumberland Records released Red EP in September 2011 with catalog number SLR 157 on compact disc, 12" vinyl, and to digital retailers. The first pressings were colored red. Limited edition pressings came on clear vinyl with gold splatter.

== Reception ==
Metacritic gave Red a "generally favorable" score of 74 out of 100 based on five professional reviews.

== Track listing ==
1. "Sweet Sixteen" - 4:20
2. "Hazel" - 3:51
3. "Your Own Nothing" - 4:13
4. "The One You Want" - 3:31
5. "Golfers" - 5:57
