= Sarandon =

Sarandon may relate to:

- Susan Sarandon (born 1946), American actress
- Chris Sarandon (born 1942), American actor
- Sarandon (band), English rock group
