= Dead to Me =

Dead to Me may refer to:

== Music ==
- Dead to Me (band), an American punk rock band
- Dead to Me (album), by Girls Names, 2011
- Dead to Me, a 2000 album by STEMM
- "Dead to Me", a song by Blackbear from Anonymous
- "Dead to Me", a song by Ded from Mis-An-Thrope
- "Dead to Me", a song by Melanie Martinez from Dollhouse
- "Dead to Me", a song by Kali Uchis from Isolation

== Television ==
- Dead to Me (TV series), a 2019 black comedy television series
