= The Mantles =

Garage rock band from San Francisco

- Origin: San Francisco, California, United States
- Genres: Indie rock, indie pop, jangle pop, garage rock
- Years active: 2004–2019
- Labels: Siltbreeze, Slumberland
- Past members: Michael Olivares; Virginia Weatherby; Jermaine Collins; Matt Roberts; Drew Cramer; Matt Kallman; Justin Loney

The Mantles were a garage rock band from San Francisco, active from 2004 to 2019.

== Background ==
The band's principal members were Michael Olivares and Virginia Weatherby, a married couple, and Matt Roberts, who played bass. Olivares and Weatherby met when Olivares worked at a record store. The couple lived in Bernal Heights, and later relocated to the Temescal neighborhood in Oakland.

The band toured and released music sporadically, with Olivares claiming that "none of us have ever imagined quitting our day jobs. If we made a 'career' out of music, we'd be on the streets." Their 2013 album, Long Enough to Leave, was the first album of theirs recorded in a studio; according to Roberts, previous albums had been recorded "in our friend's basements."

== Reception ==
Three of their albums have been reviewed by Pitchfork magazine: 2009's The Mantles (6.8/10); 2013's Long Enough to Leave (7.5/10); and 2015's All Odds End (7.5/10). Long Enough to Leave was also positively reviewed by the Washington Post.
