= First String Teenage High: The Songs of Tullycraft Played By People Who Aren't =

Compilation album
- Released: 2003
- Genre: indie pop / twee
- Label: AAJ Records/bumbleBear Records/Unchikun Records

First String Teenage High: The Songs of Tullycraft Played By People Who Aren't is a tribute album to the seminal twee band Tullycraft. The compilation features cover versions of Tullycraft songs performed by 24 indie artists. The album was originally released on AAJ/BumbleBear Records in 2003. In 2009 Unchikun Records re-released the album digitally. A second tribute album titled Wish I'd Kept A Scrapbook: A Tribute to Tullycraft was released on Unchikun Records in 2010.

== Track listing ==
No.	Title	Cover artist	Length
1.	"Pedal"	Pipper The Kissing Cat	1:28
2.	"8 Great Ways"	Murder Beach	2:16
3.	"Josie"	Invaders From A Forbidden Planet	2:58
4.	"Break Seaside and Over"	Kanda	1:29
5.	"Snap Tight Wars"	Snowfort Inc.	3:43
6.	"Bailey Park"	Crewsin' For A Brewsin'	3:01
7.	"Pink Lemonade"	Seasick Crocodile	2:00
8.	"Surfer Girl"	Blister Fist	2:48
9.	"Actives & Pledges"	Hollie Impossible	2:03
10.	"Spoiler / Wanted To"	Eric Metronome	3:35
11.	"Wild Bikini"	Saltine Crack Whores	3:34
12.	"Superboy & Supergirl"	My Place In Space	2:27
13.	"She's Got the Beat"	Boyracer	1:36
14.	"The Lives of Cleopatra"	Beltline	4:49
15.	"My Date With Rachael Sweet"	Kisswhistle	2:25
16.	"Bee Sting Stings"	Yars Revenge	3:17
17.	"Meet Me in Las Vegas"	Gang Wizard	2:37
18.	"Knee High Susan"	Winnebago	2:58
19.	"Stay Cool I'll See You This Summer"	The Boys' Star Library	2:53
20.	"Miss Douglas County"	Genoe	4:08
21.	"Sweet"	Bugs Eat Books	2:42
22.	"1st String Teenage High"	Dipstick & Eggnog	4:22
23.	"Skyway"	Fairmount Fair	2:38
24.	"Wish I'd Kept A Scrapbook"	Jimmy & Dana	2:55

== Personnel ==
- arranged by Jimmy Hughes
- mastered by Chris Bracco

== See also ==
Tullycraft
