= Kyoko (disambiguation) =

Kyoko is a Japanese feminine given name.

Kyoko may also refer to:

- Kyoko (novel), a 1995 novel by Ryu Murakami
- 35441 Kyoko, a main-belt asteroid discovered in 1998
- Kyoko, a musical project of Beatnik Filmstars singer Andrew Jarrett
