= Jinx (Weekend album) =

Studio album by Weekend
- Released: July 23, 2013
- Genres: Shoegazing; indie rock; lo-fi
- Length: 45:49
- Label: Slumberland

Weekend chronology
Red (2011)	Jinx (2013)

Singles from Jinx
- 1. "Mirror" Released: July 2, 2013

Professional ratings
Aggregate scores
Source	Rating
Metacritic	79/100
Review scores
Source	Rating
Allmusic	4/5 stars
Consequence of Sound	4/5 stars
Paste	8.1/10
Pitchfork	(6.9/10)
Slant	2.5/5 stars

Jinx is the second studio album from American band Weekend. It was released in July 2013 under Slumberland Records.

== Track list ==
No.	Title	Length
1.	"Mirror"	5:55
2.	"July"	3:54
3.	"Oubliette"	5:02
4.	"Celebration, FL"	4:58
5.	"Sirens"	3:06
6.	"Adelaide"	4:30
7.	"It's Alright"	3:30
8.	"Rosaries"	4:46
9.	"Scream Queen"	4:08
10.	"Just Drive"	6:00
