= Fairweather Friend (album) =

Studio album by the Umbrellas
- Released: January 26, 2024
- Genre: Indie pop
- Length: 34:54
- Label: Slumberland
- Producer: The Umbrellas

The Umbrellas chronology
The Umbrellas (2021)	Fairweather Friend (2024)

Fairweather Friend is the second studio album by American indie pop band the Umbrellas, released on January 26, 2024, through Slumberland Records. It received acclaim from critics.

== Critical reception ==
Professional ratings
Aggregate scores
Source	Rating
Metacritic	84/100
Review scores
Source	Rating
AllMusic	4/5 stars
Clash	8/10
Uncut	8/10

Fairweather Friend received a score of 84 out of 100 on review aggregator Metacritic based on four critics' reviews, indicating "universal acclaim". Uncut wrote that "the band's sophomore effort feels like more than a photocopy of past indie-pop glories thanks to the surprisingly punchy contributions by bassist Nick Oka and drummer Keith Frerichs and the degree of craft and care evident even in songs as breezy as 'When You Find Out'". AllMusic reviewer Fred Thomas felt that the Umbrellas "follow a blueprint mapped out by the greats of obscure, lovelorn indie pop, continuing the introverted jangle of Sarah Records, the fuzzy excitement of K Records-style melodic punks like Tiger Trap, and the romantic pop of elder indie greats like Orange Juice and Felt". Clash's Robin Murray called it "bigger, more assured than the debut, fully embracing the volume, the blistering dynamic of the live shows. It's also more refined, with The Umbrellas chipping away at the source material, taking time over every single note."

== Track listing ==
All tracks are written by Keith Frerichs, Matthew Ferrara, Morgan Alice, and Nick Oka.

Fairweather Friend track listing
No.	Title	Length
1.	"Three Cheers!"	3:16
2.	"Goodbye"	3:55
3.	"Toe the Line"	2:16
4.	"Echoes"	3:25
5.	"Say What You Mean"	4:28
6.	"Games"	2:02
7.	"Gone"	3:48
8.	"When You Find Out"	3:29
9.	"Blue"	4:19
10.	"P.M."	3:56
Total length:		34:54

== Personnel ==
The Umbrellas

- Matt Ferrara – vocals, guitar, keyboards
- Keith Frerichs – twelve-string guitar, drums, vocals
- Morgan Stanley – vocals, guitar
- Nick Oka – bass guitar
