= Kill Twee Pop! =

Studio album by Sarandon
- Released: 2008
- Recorded: InFX, London/OneCat
- Genre: Indie rock
- Label: Slumberland
- Producer: Anthony Chapman/Jon Clayton

Sarandon chronology
| The Completist's Library (2006) | Kill Twee Pop! (2008) |

Professional ratings
Review scores
| Source | Rating |
|---|---|
| Absolutepunk | (favourable) |
| Allmusic | 3/5 stars |
| Americana UK | 6/10 stars |
| Playback:stl | (favourable) |
| PopMatters | 7/10 stars |
| Soundsxp | (favourable) |

Kill Twee Pop! is the first studio album by Sarandon, following the retrospective The Completists Library. It was released in 2008 on Slumberland Records, and featured the latest line-up of the band, with singer/guitarist Crayola joined by Tom Greenhalgh on drums and former Big Flame member Alan Brown on bass.

Tim Sendra, writing for Allmusic, described the album as "the sound of angry, political musicians who aren't afraid to be fractured, jarring, and off-putting".

== Track list ==
1. "Kill Twee Pop!" (1:40)
2. "Welcome" (2:01)
3. "Lippy" (1:31)
4. "Remember Mavis?" (3:11)
5. "The Completist's Library" (2:28)
6. "Joe's Record" (1:50)
7. "Very Flexible" (2:44)
8. "Good Working Practice" (1:51)
9. "Mike's Dollar" (2:58)
10. "The Discotheque Is My Lover" (2:25)
11. "Mark" (2:03)
12. "Massive Haircut" (1:55)

== Credits ==
- Crayola – vocals, guitar, lyrics
- Alan Brown – bass guitar
- Tom Greenhalgh – drums
- Stephen Gilchrist – drums ("Joe's Record")

with:

- Ian Masters – vocals on "Kill Twee Pop!"
- John Robb – vocals on "Kill Twee Pop!"
- Nick Hobbs – vocals on "Kill Twee Pop!"
- P6 – vocals on "Kill Twee Pop!"
- Joe Morris – clapping on "Joe's Records"
- Rhodri Marsden – clapping on "Joe's Record"
- Anthony Chapman – recording engineer
- Jon Clayton – recording engineer
