= Beachy Head (song) =

Single by Veronica Falls

from the album Veronica Falls
- Released: 14 June 2010 (UK); 21 September 2010 (US)
- Recorded: 2010
- Genre: Alternative
- Length: 2:34
- Label: No Pain in Pop (UK); Captured Tracks (US)
- Songwriter(s): Veronica Falls
- Producer(s): Veronica Falls

Veronica Falls singles chronology
"Found Love in a Graveyard" (2010)	"Beachy Head" (2010)	"Bad Feeling" (2011)

"Beachy Head" is a song by British indie pop band Veronica Falls. The song was first released in the UK by independent record label No Pain in Pop on 14 June 2010, as a single with the B-side "Staying Here". The US release on 21 September 2010 came exactly one year before the release of the band's first album, Veronica Falls.

== Reception ==
Allmusic picked "Beachy Head" as one of the highlights of the album. Consequence of Sound found a connection between this song and the band's first single "Found Love in a Graveyard" and wrote: "On the deceptively upbeat "Found Love in a Graveyard", Veronica Falls tell the tale of falling for a ghost, and dips into surf-rock on the irresistible "Beachy Head", an ode of longing for a popular suicide locale." The referenced locale is Beachy Head in East Sussex, the highest seaside cliff in Great Britain. The site is notorious for its frequent employment in suicides.

== Video ==
A music video directed by Phillipa Bloomfield was released in June 2010.

== Track listing ==
1. "Beachy Head" - 2:34
2. "Staying Here" - 2:16
