= Found Love in a Graveyard =

Single by Veronica Falls

from the album Veronica Falls
- Released: February 09, 2010
- Recorded: 2009–2010
- Genre: Alternative
- Length: 3:59
- Label: Captured Tracks, Trouble Records
- Songwriter: Veronica Falls
- Producer: Veronica Falls

Veronica Falls singles chronology
"Found Love in a Graveyard" (2010)	"Beachy Head" (2010)

"Found Love in a Graveyard" is the first single of the debut self-titled studio album Veronica Falls by British indie pop band Veronica Falls. The single released a year before the release of the album on February 9, 2010, which gained positive reviews from critics.

== Receptions ==
Tim Sendra of Allmusic was positive on it and picked it as one of the highlights of the album. Michael Hann of The Guardian was also positive on the song and called it: "romance with the afterlife". Now found it good as an opening track of the album and said: "the London quartet waste no time setting up the parameters of their sound". Consequence of Sound connected the song to the band's later single Beachy Head and said: "On the deceptively upbeat "Found Love in a Graveyard", Veronica Falls tell the tale of falling for a ghost, and dips into surf-rock on the irresistible "Beachy Head", an ode of longing for a popular suicide locale". NME focused more on the vocal of the song and said: "even as vocalist Roxanne Clifford swoons longingly at ghosts in "Found Love In A Graveyard". Pitchfork gave a mixed review to the song and said: "it starts out rather dark before popping with energy".

== Track listing ==
Capture Tracks Edition:

1. "Found Love In a Graveyard" - 3:59
2. "Starry Eyes" - 2:38

Trouble Records Edition:

1. "Found Love In a Graveyard" - 3:59
2. "Stephen" - 2:26
