= Sleepyhead (band) =

Indie rock band

- Origin: New York, New York, United States
- Genres: Indie rock, Indie pop
- Years active: 1989-present
- Labels: Slumberland, Homestead, Carrot Top
- Members: Rachael McNally; Chris O’Rourke; Derek Van Beever
- Past members: Mike Galinsky; Dan Cuddy

Sleepyhead is an American indie rock band formed in 1989 in New York, New York, United States.

== Discography ==
- Punk Rock City USA (Slumberland; April 1993)
- Starduster (Homestead; 1994)
- Communist Love Songs (Homestead; 1996)
- Wild Sometimes (Carrot Top Records; May 2014)
- Future Exhibit Goes Here (Drawing Room Records; May 2018) - compilation of second and third records as above
