= Honey Bunny (disambiguation) =

Honey Bunny is a female rabbit cartoon character and the girlfriend of Bugs Bunny. Honey Bunny, Honeybunnies, or Honeybunny may also refer to:

- "Honey Bunny", "Pumpkin"'s pet name for Yolanda, his girlfriend and fellow robber in the film Pulp Fiction (1994)
- Honeybunny (2004), a thriller short film directed by Noah Harald and starring Fiona Gubelmann, Alex Weed, and Michael Yavnielli
- Honey Bunny! (manga), a manga by Ryo Ikuemi, published by Shueisha
- "Honey Bunny" (12 September 1998), an episode of Casualty, directed by Paul Wroblewski, written by Jeff Povey, and starring Derek Thompson, Ian Bleasdale, Jonathan Kerrigan
- Honey Bunny, an Indian animated TV series
- "The Honeybunnies" (26 November 1985), an episode of George Burns Comedy Week

== See also ==
- Honey Bunch
- Honeybun
- Honeybunch
