= Boyracer =

English rock band

Boyracer (sometimes styled Boyracer UK) is an English rock band from Leeds, England.

== History ==
The English rock band Boyracer was founded in Leeds, England by vocalist and guitarist Stewart Anderson in 1990. The band was named after the term boy racer. They released their first single in 1991. Richard Adams left the group in 1993, after which the group released its first EP, Naked. They then arranged to release further recordings via Sarah Records including two more EPs in 1993. Both James Chadwick and Simon Guild departed early in 1994, and Anderson put together a new line-up before releasing the group's debut full-length for Slumberland Records.

More lineup changes ensued in 1994 while the group continued to put out releases, with a number of 7 inch EPs and they toured the United States for the first time at the beginning of 1995. Later that year they signed with MCA imprint Zero Hour Records. The label dropped them while they were doing a nationwide U.S. tour. They then released several singles on independent American labels over the course of 1996. Early in 1997, the group split up, but in 2000 Anderson reconstituted the band with several new members and new material.

In 2010 the band played two shows in Los Angeles and San Francisco as part of the Slumberland Records 20th Anniversary showcase. The group played another show in Flagstaff, Arizona at the end of October 2011. Following a short hiatus, Boyracer hit the road again, touring the United States and playing beloved small venues. Anderson's label, Emotional Response Records, collaborated with Slumberland Records to launch the hugely successful Oakland Weekender festival in 2022.

== Members ==
Current

- Stewart Anderson – vocals, bass, guitar, drums (1989–present)
- Matty Green – (1994–1997, 2000-present)
- Christina Riley – guitar, vocals (2019–present)

Former members

- Laura Bridge (1989-1991, 2020)
- Simon Guild – guitar (1990–1994)
- Richard Adams – bass (1990–1993)
- James Chadwick – drums (1990–1994)
- Stewart Turner – guitar (1992-1993)
- Nicola Hodgkinson – bass (1994–1997)
- Kevin Paver – drums (1994)
- Ged McGurn – drums (1994–1997, 2007, 2018)
- Jen Turrell – bass (2000–2018)
- Frank Jordan – drums (2000–2002)
- Ara Hacopian – drums, guitar, keyboards (2001–2020)

== Discography ==
=== LPs ===
- Louisville - Leeds - TKO! (A Turntable Friend – TURN 18 1993 split with Hula Hoop)
- More Songs About Frustration and Self-Hate (Slumberland Records, 1994)
- In Full Colour (Zero Hour Records – ZH 1140 1996)
- To Get a Better Hold You've Got To Loosen Your Grip (555 Recordings, 2002)
- Girlracer (555 Recordings, 2003) split with Kanda
- Happenstance (Happy Happy Birthday To Me Records – HHBTM063 2004)
- Absence Makes the Heart Grow Harder (Foxyboy – foxy008 2004)
- A Punch Up The Bracket 555 Recordings – 555CD72 2006
- Boyracer Jukebox Vol 1 (555 Recordings, 2007)
- Flickering B+W (555 Recordings, 2007)
- Sunlight is the Best Antiseptic (555 Recordings, 2008)
- Fling Yr Bonnet Over the Windmill (Emotional Response Records, 2020)
- On a Promise (Emotional Response Records, 2020)
- Assuaged (Emotional Response Records, 2021)
- Seaside Riot (Emotional Response Records, 2024)

=== Singles ===
- Boyracer / The Ropers – Tour Split I Wish I Was A Slumberland Record – WISH 005 1994
- Hula Hoop / Boyracer (7 Fluff (2) – danny 9 1992)
- Railway (7 Fluff (2) – honey 2 1992
- Naked (7 A Turntable Friend – TURN 14 1992
- Boyracer / Sabine (7 Wurlitzer Jukebox – WJ01, Flower Me! Records – none 1993 split Sabine
- West Riding House (Zero Hour – ZERO HOUR 1 1995
- Electricity (A Turntable Friend – TURN 23F 1995
- A Mistake That Cost You Dearly (Honey Bear Records – HB014 1996
- One Side Of Boyracer Slumberland Records – SLR 49 1996
- Boyracer / My Favorite – False Economy / Modulate A Turntable Friend – TURN 28 1996
- Rhythm Of The Chicken Shake Jigsaw – PZL003 1996
- Present Tense Happy Go Lucky – HAPPY11, 555 Recordings – 55505 1997
- Don't Want Anything To Change 555 Recordings – 55535 2002
- Boyracer / Dr. König Arthus Open Records (3) – Open 012 2005
- Happy Happy Birthday To Me 2007 Singles Club #4 Happy Happy Birthday To Me Records – HHBTM 095 - SC4 2007 split Faintest Ideas
- Boyracer / Beatnik Filmstars split 555 Recordings – 55545 2007
- Boyracer / Mytty Archer – Boyracer / Mytty Archer 555 Recordings – 55544, Brittle Records – BR-04 2007
- Boyracer / Possum Moods / Hulaboy – Boyracer / Possum Moods / Hulaboy 2007 555 Recordings – 55543
- The Cannanes / Mytty Archer / Boyracer – The Cannanes / Mytty Archer / Boyracer 2008 555 Recordings – 55548, Jellyfant – 7jf05
- Que Possum / Boyracer – Que Possum / Boyracer 2008 555 Recordings – 55547
- The How / Boyracer – The How / Boyracer 555 Recordings – 55551, I Wish I Was A Slumberland Record – wish013 2010
- American Culture / Boyracer – American Culture / Boyracer Emotional Response (2) – ER-11 2014
- Boyracer / Huon – Bonus Disc! 555 Recordings – 555CD86 2008 split Huon
- Bored and Lonely - Boyracer (Emotional Response Records 2019)

=== EPs ===
- Best Flipstar EP (Lo-Fi Recordings (2) – low 3 1994)
- Pure Hatred 96 EP Sarah Records – SARAH 96 1994)
- 285 Clock Cake (Hedonist Productions – CAKE 001F 1993
- Go Flexi Crazy (Pure Hatred – Pure Hatred One & Two 1993
- From Purity to Purgatory EP (Sarah Records – SARAH 85, 1993)
- B Is for Boyracer EP (Sarah Records, Sarah Records – SARAH 76 CD 1993)
- (1994 ep) AUL 36X EP Slumberland Records – SLR 035 1994
- We Are Made of the Same Wood (Slumberland Records, A Turntable Friend – TURN 24, Slumberland Records – SLR 048 1995)
- Pain, Plunder and Personal Loss (Happy Go Lucky – HAPPY05 1995)
- Racer 100 EP (Blackbean And Placenta Tape Club – BBPTC 020 1996
- Check Yr F**king Hi$tory EP (555 Recordings – 555CD68 555 Recordings, 2003)
- Boyracer – We Have Such Gifts EP 555 Recordings – 55537 2004
- Fool Around with Boyracer 12" EP (Parapop Recordings, 2004)
- Yorkshire Soul Yellow Mica Recordings – YMR 010 2004
- It's Not True Grit, It's Real Dirt 555 Recordings – 55542 2005
- Insults and Insights EP (Kittridge Records – KITT-018 Kittridge Records, 2005)
- Winners Losers, Cuts and Bruises EP (555 Recordings – 555LP69, 555 Recordings, 2005)
- I Know What Boys Like EP freakScene. – scene 006 2014
- First String Teenage High: The Songs of Tullycraft Played By People Who Aren't (Compilation; AAJ/BumbleBear Records, 2003)
- Happenstance EP (Happy Happy Birthday to Me Records, 2004)

=== Lives and compilations ===
- Acoustically Yours (555 Recordings, 2003)
- Live At Staches, Columbus Ohio Blackbean And Placenta Tape Club – BBPTC 084 1997
- Live On WAMH Rocket Racer – RR001 1997
- B-sides and Besides (555 Recordings, 2002)
- A Punch Up the Bracket (555 Recordings, 2005)
- Punker Than You Since '92 (555 Recordings, 2006)
