= Cause Co-Motion! =

US musical group

CaUSE Co-MOTION!
- Origin: Brooklyn, New York
- Genres: Indie rock, post-punk, lo-fi
- Years active: 2005–2010
- Labels: Various
- Members: Arno - vocalist/guitarist Alex - lead guitarist Jock - drummer Liam - bass player
- Website: www.causeco-motion.com

CaUSE Co-MOTION! was an indie/punk/post-punk band from Brooklyn, New York that were active from 2005 to 2010. The band released one album, It's Time!, in 2008.

== History ==
New York City quartet CaUSE Co-MOTION! formed in the mid-2000s and featured vocalist/guitarist Arno, lead guitarist Alex, drummer Jock and bass player Liam. The band expressed a desire to only be referred to by their first names in interviews with the press. CaUSE Co-MOTION would specifically cite British-based bands Television Personalities, Swell Maps and The Raincoats as influences, as well as 1960's pop. The band began by recording a string of 7-inch singles for small labels such as Can't Cope!, Cape Shok, and What's Your Rupture?. The group would also feature on several on compilations, most notably the What's Your Rupture? label sampler alongside indie pop bands Comet Gain and Love Is All. In September 2008, the group released the I Lie Awake EP with Slumberland Records. A compilation album entitled It's Time! was released the following month, featuring singles that were previously only found on vinyl. All fourteen songs on the album were produced by Tim Barnes, known for his production work with bands The Rogers Sisters and Sonic Youth.

The band opened for Scottish rock band Franz Ferdinand at the Music Hall of Williamsburg in Brooklyn, NY in October 2008. They later toured with fellow New York City based band Crystal Stilts in October and November 2008, with the nine date tour beginning in Brooklyn and ending in Seattle, WA. The band's final release would be their 2009 EP Because Because Because, consisting of six songs with a total runtime of ten minutes.

== Discography ==
=== EPs ===
Date	Title	Format	B-Sides	Label
2006	Only Fades Away	7-inch	Split with Jowe Head and No Men	
2007	Baby Don't Do It	7-inch EP	'This Just Won't Last', 'This Tie Next Year' and 'Take a Look'	
2007	Which Way Is Up	7-inch EP	Falling Again	
2008	Who's Gonna Care	7-inch EP	'Don't You Know?', 'Say What You Feel' and 'When Will It Finally End?'	
2008	I Lie Awake	7-inch EP	'You Don't Say' and 'Cry For Attention'	Slumberland
2009	Because Because Because	12-inch EP	'Leave It All', 'You Lose', etc.	Slumberland

=== Albums ===
Year	Album information	Chart positions	
Year	Album information	US	UK
2008	It's Time! - Singles & EP's, 2005-08: 1st Compilation album; Released: October 2008; Label: Slumberland		
