= Jeanines =

Indie pop band from Brooklyn

- Origin: New York City
- Genres: Indie pop, twee pop
- Years active: 2018–present
- Labels: Slumberland Records
- Members: Alicia Hyman; Jed Smith; Maggie Gaster

Jeanines are an American indie pop band from New York City. The group is currently signed to Slumberland Records.

== History ==
Jeanines began in the late 2010s with singer Alicia Hyman and bassist/drummer Jed Smith. They put two demos online in early 2018, followed by more later in the year. In 2019, Jeanines released their debut self-titled album. Smith had previously been in My Teenage Stride.

In 2022, the duo followed up their debut with their second full-length album titled Don't Wait for a Sign. The album received positive reviews. They released their third album How Long Can It Last on June 27, 2025. It featured contributions from the group's live bassist Maggie Gaster.

== Discography ==
=== Studio albums ===
- Jeanines (2019)
- Don’t Wait For A Sign (2022)
- How Long Can It Last (2025)
