= Dead to Me (album) =

Studio album by Girls Names
- Released: 25 April 2011
- Recorded: June–October 2010
- Studio: Start Together Studios, Belfast
- Genre: Alternative rock; post-punk; surf rock
- Length: 28:19
- Label: Tough Love Records (Europe); Slumberland Records (USA)
- Producer: Barrett Lahey; Girls Names

Girls Names chronology
You Should Know by Now EP (2010)	Dead to Me (2011)	The New Life (2013)

Singles from Dead to Me
- 1. "I Lose" Released: 23 November 2010

Dead to Me is the debut album by Northern Irish band Girls Names. It was released on 25 April 2011 by Tough Love in Europe and Slumberland Records in the USA.

== Background and recording ==
The songs on Dead to Me were recorded and ready to put out by October 2010 but the band had to wait until the following April for the album's release. Lead singer Cathal Cully claims this was the reason for the album's title, stating that, in the intervening time, the band had grown tired of the songs and was experimenting with a different sound, meaning that "Dead to Me literally was dead to us by the time it was committed to wax".

Opening track "Lawrence" was named after Felt singer Lawrence, with Cully explaining that the song was a homage to the British band's song "All the People I Like Are Those That Are Dead" from the 1986 album Forever Breathes the Lonely Word. It was used in a 2013 advertising campaign for the Northern Ireland Tourist Board.

"I Lose" was written in response to San Francisco band Brilliant Colors' song "You Win", for a split 7-inch single featuring both bands.

== Critical reception ==
Professional ratings
Aggregate scores
Source	Rating
Metacritic	75/100
Review scores
Source	Rating
AllMusic	3.5/5 stars
AU	8/10 stars
Cokemachineglow	7.4 stars on a 10-point scale
Consequence of Sound	B
NME	3.5/5 stars
Pitchfork	7.5/10
State.ie	3.5/5 stars
Tiny Mix Tapes	3/5 marks

Dead to Me has received mostly positive reviews. The album currently has a 75 out of 100 on the review aggregating site Metacritic, indicating "generally favorable reviews".

== Track listing ==
All songs written by Cathal Cully.

No.	Title	Length
1.	"Lawrence"	2:56
2.	"I Could Die"	2:20
3.	"When You Cry"	3:02
4.	"No More Words"	2:53
5.	"Nothing More to Say"	2:08
6.	"I Lose"	3:45
7.	"Cut Up"	2:50
8.	"Bury Me"	3:20
9.	"Kiss Goodbye"	2:45
10.	"Séance on a Wet Afternoon"	2:59

== Personnel ==
- Claire Miskimmin: bass guitar, backing vocals
- Neil Brogan: drums, percussion, piano
- Cathal Cully: guitar, organ, vocals
