= Frankie Rose =

American musician and songwriter (born 1979)

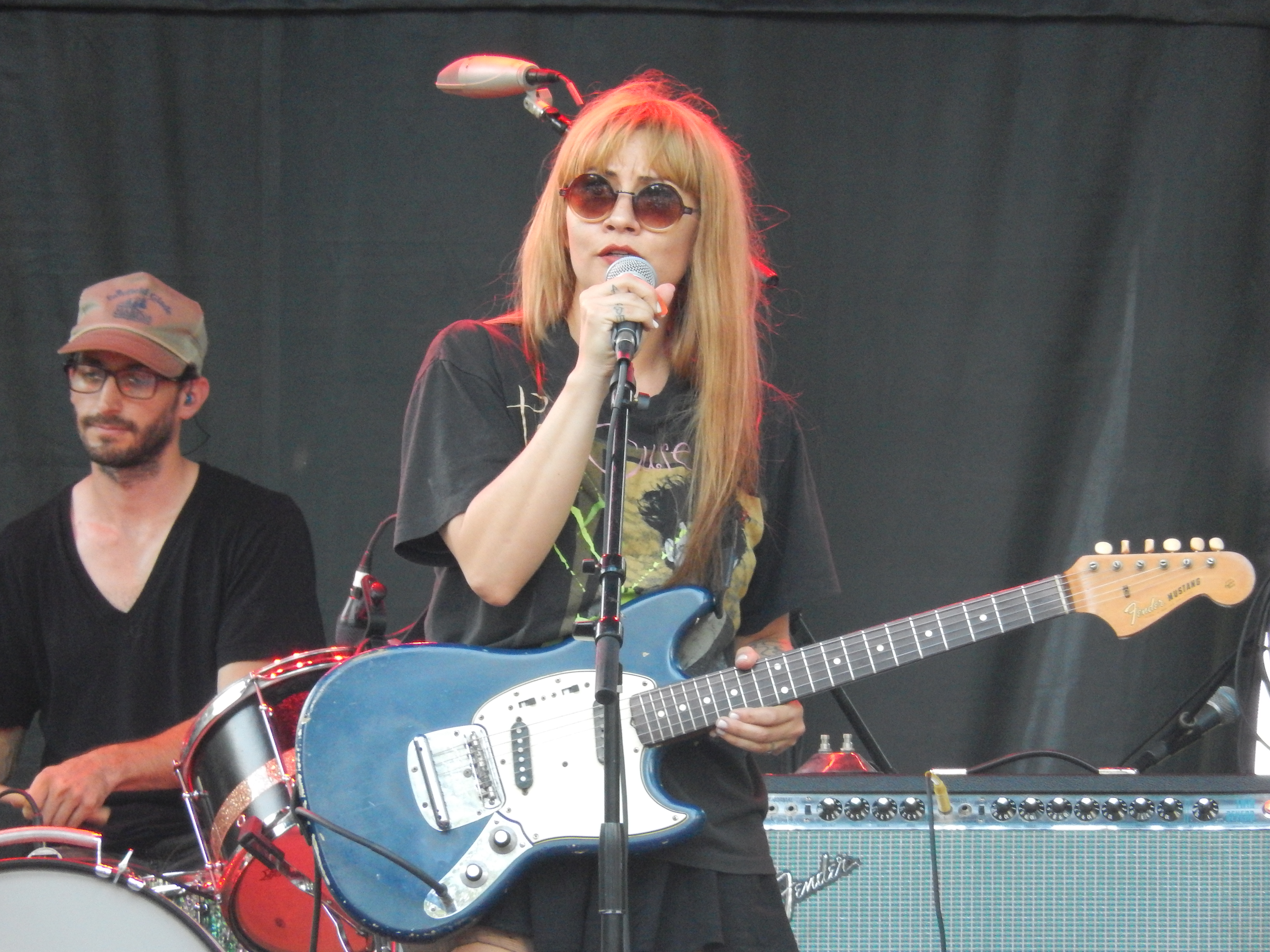
- Rose performing in Chicago at the Pitchfork Music Festival in 2013

Background information
- Born: January 18, 1979 (age 47)
- Occupations: Musician, songwriter
- Instruments: Drums, guitar, synth
- Labels: Slumberland, Fat Possum
- Website: www.frankierose.info

Frankie Rose (born January 18, 1979) is an American musician and songwriter. She was an original member of Crystal Stilts, Dum Dum Girls, Vivian Girls and Beverly.

== Career ==
Formerly of bands Vivian Girls and Beverly, Frankie was the drummer for the acts Crystal Stilts and Dum Dum Girls. Rose released her first single "Thee Only One" on Slumberland Records in 2009 under Frankie Rose and the Outs and followed up in 2010 with a full-length album as Frankie Rose. Her second full-length album, Interstellar, was released in February 2012 and earned a "Best New Music" designation from Pitchfork.^{[2]} Her third album titled Herein Wild was released by Fat Possum in 2013. She lives in Brooklyn, New York, and released her fourth album, Cage Tropical, in August 2017.

In 2017, Rose released a track-for-track cover album of the Cure's Seventeen Seconds.

In March 2023, Rose released her seventh solo album Love as Projection, and announced a tour of the US and Canada for April, May, and June. She will be joined by Donzii, Postcards from Paradise, Romeo Blu, Offerings, and SRSQ.

In June 2026, Rose announced new album Hila would be released on 18th September by Born Losers in most of the world and Night School in Europe and the UK. The album was produced by Rose at her home studio, and will feature contributions from drummer Justin Welch of Elastica and Lush.

== Discography ==
=== Albums ===
- Frankie Rose and the Outs (Slumberland, 2010)
- Interstellar (Slumberland, 2012)
- Herein Wild (Fat Possum, 2013)
- Careers (Kanine, 2014) – as Beverly
- Cage Tropical (Slumberland/Grey, 2017)
- Seventeen Seconds (Slumberland, 2019)
- Love as Projection (Slumberland, 2023)
- Hila (Self Released/Born Losers Records, 2026)

=== EPs ===
- Night Swim (Slumberland, 2012)

=== Singles ===
- "Thee Only One" (Slumberland, 2009)
- "Know Me" (Slumberland, 2012)
