= Girls Names =

Irish band

- Girls Names performing at Primavera Sound, Barcelona, in June 2012

Background information
- Origin: Belfast, Northern Ireland
- Genres: Post-punk, Surf rock, Noise pop, Lo-fi, Alternative rock
- Years active: 2009–2019
- Labels: Slumberland Records; Tough Love; Captured Tracks; CF Records
- Past members: Cathal Cully; Neil Brogan; Claire Miskimmin; Philip Quinn; Gib Cassidy; Sarah Grimes
- Website: www.girlsnamesband.com

Girls Names was a band from Belfast, Northern Ireland, formed in 2009 by Cathal Cully and Neil Brogan. Before they disbanded in 2019, the released four albums—Dead To Me, The New Life, Arms Around a Vision, and Stains on Silence—as well as several EPs, singles, and split singles.

== History ==
Cathal Cully and Neil Brogan became friends in 2008 and, in January 2009, Camlough native Cully agreed to create a band to support US surf pop band Wavves at a show in Belfast venue Laverys Bunker the following month, despite never having been in a band himself. He asked Brogan, from Bangor, to join him for the show as drummer, meaning Brogan had to learn to play the drums for the performance. The duo recorded a number of cassette-only demo releases which they put out through Cass/Flick Records (later renamed CF Records), a label founded by Brogan in 2006. In June of that year, they recorded a demo of the song "Cold Hands, Warm Heart" and contacted the Brooklyn-based indie label Captured Tracks. The label's founder, Mike Sniper, was impressed with the track and said he would be willing to release a record for them if they had more songs. They returned to him in November with 11 tracks, resulting in the release of Girls Names EP in April 2010. In the weeks before the EP's release, Cully and Brogan recruited Claire Miskimmin as bassist with the band, and Cully has claimed he had to teach Miskimmin to play the instrument before she could join them on tour.

Girls Names released a split single with San Diego quintet Heavy Hawaii in April 2010 and the eight-song mini-album You Should Know By Now in May, on British indie label Tough Love, featuring songs recorded before those that appeared on Girls Names EP. Between June and October 2010, the trio recorded their debut album at Belfast's Start Together Studios. One of the album's tracks, "I Lose", was released on a split 7-inch single with Brilliant Colors in November 2010 – the Girls Names song written in response to the all-female San Francisco trio's flip-side track "You Win". The limited edition single was released on Slumberland Records in the US and Tough Love in Europe. The 11-track album, Dead To Me, was released on the same labels in April 2011, and received an average score of 75% on review aggregating website Metacritic, indicating "generally favorable reviews". However, by the time of the album's release, the band was claiming that they had a new album ready to record and had already changed their style of music. They released a download-only single, "Black Saturday", in October 2011.

In early 2012, local musician Philip Quinn, who also performed at the time with the band Charles Hurts, was added to the line-up as guitarist and keyboardist, playing his first show with the band on 29 March in Belfast's Mandela Hall, by which stage the band was only playing one song from Dead To Me in their set. In July 2012, they released the song "A Troubled See" on a split 7-inch single with London band Weird Dreams and October saw the release of "The New Life", the first single and title track from the band's forthcoming second album, with both new songs showcasing a shift in direction from the looser noise-pop of their earlier releases towards a krautrock, motorik-influenced sound and longer song lengths. "Hypnotic Regression", the second single from The New Life, was released as a download-only single in December. The album was released on 18 February 2013. Prior to a European tour to promote The New Life, the band announced Brogan would be taking some time off from Girls Names and would be replaced for the tour by Gib Cassidy of Dublin-based group Logikparty. Brogan later announced his full departure from the band and permanent replacement by Cassidy via the band's Facebook page on 30 July 2013. Cassidy was a member of the band for their third album, Arms Around A Vision, which was released on 2 October 2015, and for the resulting tour. However, he would depart the band just over a year later.

On 29 March 2018, the now three-piece announced the release of their new album titled Stains on Silence on their Facebook page.

On 31 January 2019, the band disbanded. Posting on Instagram, frontman Cully said, "So after a whole decade we've decided to call time on the band. It's been some journey from absolutely nothing – literally absolutely nothing, no clue but naïvety, ignorance and some youthful idealism. But ten years is a long time to be neither here nor there."

== Side projects ==
Brogan performs his own material as a guitarist and vocalist in Sea Pinks and frequently enlisted Cully and Miskimmin on bass and drums respectively, for live shows between 2010 and 2012. Later, members of Charles Hurts played as Brogan's backing band. Sea Pinks has released seven albums (Youth Is Wasted in September 2010, Dead Seas in September 2011, Freak Waves in September 2012, Dreaming Tracks in September 2014, Soft Days in January 2016, Watercourse in May 2017 and Rockpool Blue in September 2018). Brogan describes Sea Pinks' style as having "substituted Girls Names' shades of grey for a sunnier disposition and more stripped-down sound". He also runs the Belfast-based indie label CF Records (formerly known as Cass/Flick and Caff/Flick), which put out the first Girls Names releases as well as recordings by Cloud Nothings, Mount Eerie, High Places, Lucky Dragons, Thread Pulls, No Monster Club and Patrick Kelleher.

Miskimmin and Brogan swap bass and guitar playing duties in Cruising along with Grimes on drums and singer Benni Johnson of Logikparty (who Cassidy also performed with). They released a cassette single via Soft Power Records and a vinyl EP via Tough Love Records.

Gross Net is the solo industrial/electronic alias of Philip Quinn since the departure of founding member Christian Donaghey in 2015. Art For Blind Records released their initial release in 2014, while first album Quantitative Easing was released by Touch Sensitive Records in 2016 and second LP, Gross Net Means Gross Net, was released by Los Angeles-based label Felte Records in August 2019.

Quinn also performed in Charles Hurts, initially a solo project which later included Steven Henry on bass and Davey Agnew on drums. Charles Hurts has released two EPs on CF Records.

Cathal Cully occasionally performs with Belfast psychedelic drone pop band Documenta, fronted by songwriter Joe Greene.

Miskimmin now plays bass in alternative rock act New Pagans, who won Best Live Act at the Northern Ireland Music Prize in 2020. They released their first album The Seed, The Vessel, The Roots and All in 2021.

== Discography ==
=== Albums ===
- You Should Know By Now (Tough Love/Slumberland Records, May 2010)
- Dead to Me (Tough Love/Slumberland Records, April 2011)
- The New Life (Tough Love/Slumberland Records, February 2013)
- Arms Around a Vision (Tough Love, October 2015)
- Stains on Silence (Tough Love, June 2018)

=== EPs ===
- C1001/02 (double cassette EP, CF Records, September 2009) – limited to 25 copies
- Girls Names EP (12-inch/download, Captured Tracks, April 2010)
- You Should Know By Now (12-inch/download, Tough Love, May 2010) – limited to 200 copies
- The Next Life (12-inch/download, Tough Love/Slumberland Records, October 2013) – available on limited white vinyl (US), limited clear vinyl (UK) and black vinyl
- Zero Triptych (12-inch/download, Tough Love, May 2015)

=== Singles ===
- "Black Saturday" (download only, Tough Love/Slumberland Records, October 2011)
- "The New Life" (12-inch on white vinyl/download, Tough Love/Slumberland Records, November 2012) – limited to 300 copies
- "Hypnotic Regression" (download only, Tough Love/Slumberland Records, December 2012)

=== Split singles ===
- "Split" (CF Records, May 2010) (split cassette with Heavy Hawaii) – limited to 100 copies
- "I Lose"/ "You Win" (Tough Love/Slumberland Records, November 2010) (split 7-inch with Brilliant Colors) – limited to 600 copies
- "A Troubled See" / "House of Secrets" (Tough Love/Slumberland Records, July 2012) (split 7-inch blue/purple vinyl with Weird Dreams) – limited to 300 copies
