= Veronica Falls =

British band (2009–2014)

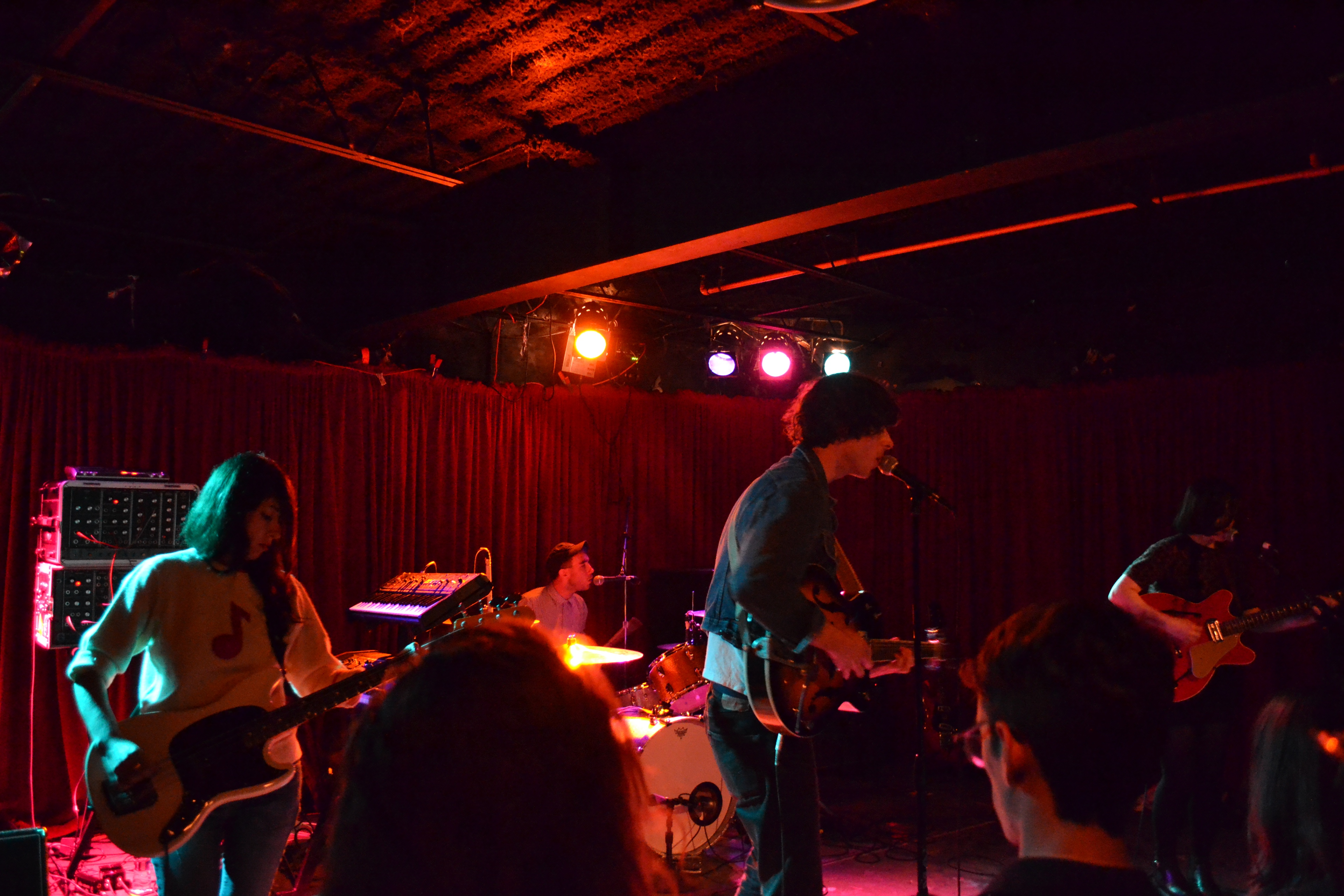
- Veronica Falls performing in 2011

Background information
- Origin: London, England
- Genres: Indie pop, indie rock
- Years active: 2009–2014
- Labels: Slumberland, Bella Union, Captured Tracks
- Spinoffs: The Proper Ornaments; Ultimate Painting; Boys Forever; Patience
- Past members: Roxanne Clifford; Marion Herbain; James Hoare; Patrick Doyle
- Website: veronicafalls.com

Veronica Falls were a British indie pop band that formed in London in 2009. The band consisted of Roxanne Clifford and James Hoare, both on vocals and guitar, Marion Herbain on bass guitar and Patrick Doyle on drums and backing vocals. The members of the band were formerly in the bands The Royal We and Sexy Kids. The band released several singles in the United Kingdom and the United States throughout the 2010s.

Veronica Falls came to prominence with the release of their self-titled debut album in 2011. The album entered the UK Albums Chart at No. 150.

== History ==
=== Formation and early work (2009–2010) ===
In 2009, Roxanne Clifford and Patrick Doyle from Sexy Kids teamed up with James Hoare of Your Twenties. Clifford and Doyle met Hoare at a Comet Gain show. After a meeting with Hoare, their friend Marion Herbain accepted to join the band to form Veronica Falls.

In 2010, Veronica Falls released two singles, "Found Love in a Graveyard" and "Beachy Head", on the American label Captured Tracks.

=== Veronica Falls (2011) ===
After releasing their first two singles, the band recorded with veteran producer Guy Fixsen. They released their debut album Veronica Falls in September 2011 on Slumberland Records in the United States and Bella Union in the European Union, to generally favorable reviews. The album was preceded by the release of a single, "Bad Feeling", in August 2011.

=== Waiting for Something to Happen (2013) ===
In February 2013, the band released their second album, Waiting for Something to Happen. It was co-produced by Rory Attwell. The album's release was preceded by the "My Heart Beats" and "Teenage" singles in 2012. A music video for "Teenage" was released in November 2012.

=== 2014–present ===
Since 2014, individual members of the band have been involved in separate projects. James Hoare formed The Proper Ornaments with Max Claps and released the album Wooden Head in 2014. He then co-led the band Ultimate Painting until the band's split in February 2018. Drummer Patrick Doyle worked under the name Boys Forever and released a self-titled album on 5 August 2016. Singer Roxanne Clifford began to release music as Patience in 2016. Patrick Doyle died on 4 March 2018.

== Personnel ==
- Roxanne Clifford – lead vocals, guitar
- Marion Herbain – bass
- James Hoare – guitar, vocals
- Patrick Doyle – drums, vocals (d. 2018)

== Discography ==
=== Albums ===
- Veronica Falls (2011)
- Waiting for Something to Happen (2013)

=== EPs ===
- 5 Demos (2011)
- Six Covers EP, vinyl on Rough Trade (2011) US tour CD (2012)
- Demos + More, cassette limited Veronica Falls/Brilliant Colors split (2012)
- Six Covers Vol. 2, vinyl on Rough Trade (2013) US tour CD (2013)

=== Singles ===
Title	Release date	Album	Format
"Found Love in a Graveyard"	9 February 2010	Veronica Falls	Digital download and 7" record
"Beachy Head"	21 September 2010	Veronica Falls	Digital download and 7" record
"Bad Feeling"	30 August 2011	Veronica Falls	Digital download and 7" record
"My Heart Beats"	3 April 2012	Waiting for Something to Happen	7" black & white splatter record
"Teenage"	17 December 2012	Waiting for Something to Happen	7" record & Digital
"Waiting For Something To Happen"	18 June 2013	Waiting for Something to Happen	7" record & Digital
"Broken Toy"	22 October 2013	Waiting for Something to Happen	7" record & Digital

== See also ==
- British rock
