= The New Life (album) =

Studio album by Girls Names
- Released: 18 February 2013
- Recorded: August 2011, June–October 2012
- Studios: Start Together Studios, Belfast
- Length: 43:07
- Label: Tough Love Records
- Producer: Cathal Cully

Girls Names chronology
Dead to Me (2011)	The New Life (2013)	Arms Around A Vision (2015)

Singles from The New Life
- 1. "The New Life" Released: 13 November 2012; 2. "Hypnotic Regression" Released: 10 December 2012

Professional ratings
Aggregate scores
Source	Rating
Metacritic	76/100
Review scores
Source	Rating
All Music Guide	4/5 stars
AU	8/10
Consequence of Sound	3/5 stars
Drowned in Sound	9/10
Exclaim!	5/10
The Fly	4/5 stars
The Irish Times	3/5 stars
NME	8/10
Paste	7.3/10
Pitchfork	6.5/10
PopMatters	6/10 stars
Q	4/5 stars
The Line of Best Fit	5/10 stars
Under the Radar	7.5/10 stars

The New Life is the second album by Northern Irish band Girls Names. It was released on 18 February 2013 by Tough Love Records in Europe and on 12 March 2013 by Slumberland Records in the USA. Its release was preceded by the album's title track "The New Life" as a single on 13 November 2012 and the song "Hypnotic Regression" as a download-only single on 10 December 2012. The album cover features a photograph by Rob Peart. The New Life received an aggregate score of 76 out of 100 according to review aggregator website Metacritic, indicating "generally favorable reviews".

An EP of remixes of tracks from The New Life, entitled The Next Life, was released in October 2013 in digital and vinyl formats. Both formats also include a cover version of the Brian Eno song, "Third Uncle".

== Track listing ==
All songs written by Cathal Cully.

No.	Title	Length
1.	"Portrait"	0:50
2.	"Pittura Infamante"	4:55
3.	"Drawing Lines"	4:50
4.	"Hypnotic Regression"	3:48
5.	"Occultation"	5:13
6.	"A Second Skin"	4:05
7.	"The Olympia"	4:06
8.	"Notion"	2:54
9.	"Projektion"	4:50
10.	"The New Life"	7:36
Total length:		43:07

iTunes bonus track
No.	Title	Length
11.	"Visions"	3:36
Total length:		46:43

== Personnel ==
- Neil Brogan: drums
- Cathal Cully: guitars, synths, keys, drum machines, vocals
- Claire Miskimmin: bass guitar
- Philip Quinn: synth on "Projektion" and "Occultation"
