= Interstellar (album) =

Studio album by Frankie Rose
- Released: February 21, 2012 (US), March 19, 2012 (UK)
- Studio: Thermometer Factory
- Genres: Dream pop, shoegaze, synth pop
- Length: 32:30
- Labels: Slumberland, Memphis Industries
- Producer: Le Chev

Frankie Rose chronology
Frankie Rose and the Outs (2010)	Interstellar (2012)	Herein Wild (2013)

Singles from Interstellar
- 1. "Know Me" Released: 2012

Interstellar is a studio album by American musician Frankie Rose, released in 2012. It was her second LP as a solo artist, following her 2010 debut Frankie Rose And The Outs.

== Writing and recording ==
The album was recorded at the Thermometer Factory studio in the Park Slope neighborhood of Brooklyn, New York City. It was produced by Le Chev, who previously produced Passion Pit, collaborated with Fischerspooner, and remixed the song Candy off Frankie Rose's first album Frankie Rose And The Outs. Le Chev assisted Rose in using synthesizers in her songs.

Album reviews noted the album's departure from Frankie Rose's previous lo-fi sound.

== Release and promotion ==
Interstellar's leading single was Know Me, for which a music video was published in July 2012. The album was released on February 21, 2012 through Slumberland Records in the United States. In the United Kingdom the album was released on March 19 through the Memphis Industries label.

== Reception ==
The album was Stereogum's "Album Of The Week" and "Best New Music" at Pitchfork. Its title track was Pitchfork's "Best New Track".

== Track list ==
All lyrics are written by Frankie Rose; all music is composed by Frankie Rose

No.	Title	Length
1.	"Interstellar"	3:28
2.	"Know Me"	2:52
3.	"Gospel/Grace"	3:02
4.	"Daylight Sky"	2:46
5.	"Pair Of Wings"	4:03
6.	"Had We Had It"	3:05
7.	"Night Swim"	2:34
8.	"Apples For The Sun"	4:04
9.	"Moon In My Mind"	3:09
10.	"The Fall"	3:27
Total length:		32:30

== Personnel ==
- Frankie Rose – Electric guitar, lead vocals
- Le Chev – Producer
