= Rocketship (band) =

American indie pop band

- Origin: Sacramento, California, United States
- Genres: Indie pop, twee pop, shoegazing
- Years active: 1993–present
- Labels: Nonstop Cooperative, Slumberland, Bus Stop, Darla
- Members: Dusty Reske; Ellen Osborn
- Past members: Heidi Barney; Verna Brock; Jim Rivas; Robert Cartright
- Website: rocketshipmusic.com

Rocketship is an American indie pop band formed in Sacramento, California, United States, in 1993, and currently based in Portland, Oregon. Led by singer-songwriter and guitarist Dustin Reske with bassist Verna Brock, keyboardist Heidi Barney and drummer Jim Rivas, the group released the single "Hey, Hey, Girl" in 1994 and the album A Certain Smile, a Certain Sadness in 1996. After the album's release, the original line-up dissolved and Reske continued Rocketship essentially as a solo project, releasing the singles "Honey, I Need You" and "Get on the Floor (And Move It)" in 1997 and the albums Garden of Delights in 1999, Here Comes... Rocketship in 2006, and Thanks to You in 2019.

Rocketship's sound can be described as 1960s-style twee pop, characterized by ringing guitars, droning organs and shoegazing influences. AllMusic has further categorized some of the styles as space age pop, dream pop and indie pop. However, as a solo project, Reske has taken the sound in an ambient direction.

In May 2014, Rocketship performed for the first time in several years, during both SF Popfest and NYC Popfest festivals.

== Discography ==
=== Albums ===
- A Certain Smile, a Certain Sadness (February 13, 1996)
  - Slumberland Records SLR 40
  1. "I Love You Like the Way That I Used to Do"
  2. "Kisses Are Always Promises"
  3. "Heather, Tell Me Why"
  4. "Let's Go Away"
  5. "I'm Lost Without You Here"
  6. "Carrie Cooksey"
  7. "We're Both Alone"
  8. "Friendships and Love"
- Garden of Delights (1999)
  - Drive-In Records drive26
  1. "We Took the High Road"
  2. "Butterflies"
  3. "Carved by Winds and Waters"
  4. "Artesian Wells"
  5. "Furness"
  6. "The Deadly Fisher"
  7. "Jewels from Many Lands"
- Here Comes... Rocketship (February 2006)
  - Nonstop Cooperative Records; CD-R only available online
  1. "The Scene Section"
  2. "You're Too Young"
  3. "Oh! Woe Is Me"
  4. "The Foxes' Teeth"
  5. "No More Tomorrows"
  6. "They March in Line"
  7. "The Passersby"
  8. "I'm Gonna Take Your Place"
  9. "This Modern Livin'"
  10. "Good Intentions"
  11. "Noose and Saddle Blues"
  12. "Our New Track"
- Thanks to You (October 11, 2019)
  - Darla Records
  1. "Under Streetlight Shadows"
  2. "Nothing Deep Inside"
  3. "I Just Can't Get Enough of You"
  4. "A Terrible Fix"
  5. "Outer Otherness"
  6. "What's the Use of Books?"
  7. "Broken Musicbox"
  8. "Milk-Aisle Smiles"
  9. "City, Fair"
  10. "I Don't Know Why I Still Love You"

=== Singles ===
- "Hey, Hey, Girl" (1994)
  - 7" single; The Bus Stop Label BUS034
  1. "Hey, Hey, Girl"
  2. "Naomi and Me"
  3. "People I Know"
- Split single with Henry's Dress (May 1996)
  - 7" single; I Wish I Was a Slumberland Record WISH 006
  1. Henry's Dress – "Over 21"
  2. Henry's Dress – "Can't Make It Move"
  3. Rocketship – "It's Going to Be Soon"
- "Honey, I Need You" (1997)
  - 7" single; The Bus Stop Label BUS057
  1. "Honey, I Need You"
  2. "She's Gonna Make Me Cry"
- "Get on the Floor (And Move It)" (May 1997)
  - 7" single; Jigsaw Records PZL005
  1. "Get on the Floor (And Move It)"
  2. "All the Pleasures"
- Split EP with Trace (August 2003)
  - 2-CD set; Omnibus Records omni030
  1. Rocketship – "The Quad"
  2. Rocketship – "James, That's All Over Now"
  3. Rocketship – "You'll Regret It Someday"
  4. Rocketship – "Never Going to Let You"
  5. Rocketship – "Post-Work Comedown"
  6. Trace – "Annuals"
  7. Trace – "Poles and Mountains"
  8. Trace – "Say It All Was True"
  9. Trace – "I Want Less"
  10. Trace – "You Should Know It"
  11. Trace – "Hall of Doom"
  12. Trace – "Do Loops"

== Members ==
=== Current ===
- Dusty Reske - Vocals, Various Instruments (1993-present)
- Ellen Osborn - Vocals, Various Instruments (2015-present)

=== Former ===
- Verna Brock - Bass (1993-1996)
- Heidi Barney - Keyboards (1993-1996)
- Jim Rivas - Drums (1993-1996)
