= 14 Iced Bears =

British indie pop band

- Origin: Brighton, England
- Genre: Indie pop
- Years active: 1985–1992, 2022
- Labels: Thunderball, Borderline, Slumberland, Frank, Sarah
- Past members: Rob Sekula; Kevin Canham; Alan White; Dominic Minques; Nick Emery; Nick Roughley; Steve Ormsby; Bill Cox; Will Taylor; Graham Durrant; Tim White; Rob Colley; Sue Freeman

14 Iced Bears were a British indie pop band associated with the C86 music scene. Formed in Brighton in 1985, by Robert Sekula and Nick Emery the band featured a shifting line-up of musicians across their seven-year existence, centred on songwriter and vocalist Rob Sekula and guitarist/songwriter Kevin Canham. Their jangly indie pop was characterised by a fuzzy protopunk-influenced guitar sound, and saw them receive modest critical acclaim in Britain's music press as well as prompting disc jockey John Peel to recruit them to record a couple of sessions for his programme on BBC radio. The group released a handful of singles, including "Come Get Me" on the influential Sarah label, and two full-length albums: the eponymous 14 Iced Bears (1988), and Wonder (1991).

They reformed in 2010 and toured the US east coast, the US west coast in 2011, as well as some concerts in London, including a John Peel night with Vic Godard, Viv Albertine and the TV Personalities. Robert Sekula announced from the stage of Indietracks Festival 2012 on 7 July that their set had been their first at an outdoor festival. In July 2013, they released a 2-CD retrospective of their total output Hold on Inside on Cherry Red Records. The month previously, their track "Balloon Song" was included in the comprehensive 1980s indie compilation CD Scared to Get Happy, which featured bands such as The Stone Roses, Primal Scream and The Jesus and Mary Chain (Cherry Red Records).

Robert Sekula has released solo projects since 2019 on Bandcamp and Precious Recordings of London.

== Musical style ==
AllMusic considers the band to be representative of the neo-psychedelia and psychedelic pop styles.

== Influence ==
In 2003, 14 Iced Bears were mentioned in the song "Twee" by Tullycraft, and "The Balloon Song" was recorded by The Aislers Set for their 2001 album, The Last Match.

== Discography ==
=== Albums and EPs ===
- 14 Iced Bears (Thunderball Records, 1988)
- Precision (Thunderball Records, 1990) – a compilation of singles
- Wonder (Borderline Records, 1991)
- Let the Breeze Open Our Hearts (Overground Records, 1998) — compilation of singles and first album
- In the Beginning (Slumberland Records, 2001) – a compilation of previously released material and live recordings
- Hold on Inside (Cherry Red, 2013) — compilation spanning all the band's releases

=== Singles ===
14 Iced Bears

- "Inside" / "Bluesuit" / "Cut" (Frank Records, 1986)
- "Balloon Song" / "Like a Dolphin" (Frank Records, 1987)
- "Balloon Song (live) (7" flexi, split with the Hermit Crabs)
- "Lie To Choose" (Penetration, 1987) (7" flexi, split with Splendour in the Grass)
- "Come Get Me" (Sarah Records, 1988)
- "World I Love" (Thunderball Records, 1989)
- "Mother Sleep" (Thunderball Records, 1989)
- "Falling Backwards"/"World I Love" (Surfacer, 1989) (split EP with Crocodile Ride)
- "Hold On" (Borderline Records, 1991)
- "Inside" / "Balloon Song" (Slumberland Records, 2001)

Solo Robert Sekula

- "Not Santa Claus" (Bandcamp.com, 2019)
- "Pamela" (Bandcamp.com 2022)
- "Not Santa Claus (Sno-Fi mix)" (Bandcamp.com 2022)
- "Asyd Mouse ep" (Precious Recordings of London/Bandcamp 2025)

=== Various compilations ===
- CD86 (Sanctuary Records Group, 2006)
- Scared to Get Happy (Cherry Red, 2013)
