= Weekend (American band) =

- Origin: San Francisco, California, U.S.
- Genres: Shoegaze, lo-fi, post-punk
- Years active: 2009–present
- Labels: Slumberland Records
- Members: Shaun Durkan; Kevin Johnson; Abe Pedroza
- Past members: Taylor Valentino
- Website: weekendtheband.bandcamp.com

Weekend is an American lo-fi or shoegaze trio from San Francisco, California. The band formed in 2009 and released two EPs, with the full-length debut album Sports coming on Slumberland Records in 2010. The album received an 8.2 rating from Pitchfork Media. It also received 4/5 stars on Tinymixtapes and was also reviewed by National Public Radio, the Portland Mercury, Boston Phoenix, NME, Drowned in Sound, Brooklyn Vegan, The Onion's AV Club, and PopMatters.

Sports was also mentioned in Sports Illustrated alongside the more commercially successful album with the same name by Huey Lewis and the News.

Their song "End Times" was used in a commercial to promote Season 6 of Dexter.

The band released their second album, Jinx, on July 23, 2013, on Slumberland Records.

In late 2018, Weekend toured with Nothing and Thursday.

== Discography ==
=== Albums ===
- Sports (2010, Slumberland)
- Jinx (2013, Slumberland)

=== EPs ===
- Red (2011, Slumberland)

=== 10" Singles ===
- All-American (2010, Mexican Summer)

=== 7" singles ===
- End Times (2011, Slumberland, Neon transparent yellow)

=== Split 7" singles ===
- Weekend's End Times b/w Young Prisms' I Don't Get Much (2010, Transparent)
