= Violens =

American band

- Origin: New York
- Genres: pop-psych; synth-pop; thrash metal
- Years active: 2007–2012
- Labels: Friendly Fire Recordings; Deadly People; Slumberland Records; Static Recital
- Past members: Jorge Elbrecht; Iddo Arad; Myles Matheny

Violens was an American synth-pop band. Jorge Elbrecht and Iddo Arad formed the band in 2007 while living in Brooklyn, New York, and Myles Matheny joined them in 2009. In 2008, the band released their self-titled extended play under the Deadly People record label. Their debut album Amoral was released in 2010, later followed by the second album True, released in 2012.

In addition, they have released two mixtapes titled Winter 2009 Mixtape and Summer 2010 Mixtape with collaborations by other artists and bands including MGMT and Chairlift.

The band's name derives from the combination of the words "violence" and "violins".

== History ==
Prior to the band's formation, Elbrecht met Iddo Arad in Miami in 1996. Arad performed with Elbrecht's art collective, Lansing-Dreiden, in New York and Miami in the early 2000s.

Following the last music release by Lansing-Dreiden, the band relocated to Brooklyn and began performing as Violens. The band was formed in late 2007 by Jorge Elbrecht as an outlet for his song writing, with the help of Iddo Arad. They released their debut, self-titled EP on October 27, 2008 under the Deadly People record label. Before starting work on their debut album, Violens toured in the US and Europe in 2009, opening for Deerhunter, Bat for Lashes, and Grizzly Bear. Violens went on tour with White Lies through November to December 2009. In early 2010, Myles Matheny joined the band.

In May 2010, the debut album Amoral was announced to be released in November of the same year. A British tour was also announced for November and December. The album was released early in the UK on October 3, 2010 under the Friendly Fire Recordings and Static Recital record labels. In 2011, the band began releasing singles "to test out production ideas and gauge fan reaction" which were then collectively released as a compilation titled Nine Songs. While on tour, the band recorded "30 or 40" demos, of which 4 ended up on the upcoming album. Leading up to the release of their second album, Violens toured on the east coast from March to May 2012. The second album, True, was released on May 15, 2012 under Slumberland Records, featuring vocals by Caroline Polachek, who had previously worked with them on songs from Violens' mixtapes.

Their self-titled debut EP charted on the "Official Physical Singles Chart" in the UK on February 15, 2014, peaking at number 95.

Since the release of True, the band has not released any new material. Jorge Elbrecht continues releasing solo music under his name, with his solo debut album Here Lies being released in 2018.

== Musical style ==
Violens are related to such genres as 1960s psychedelic pop, thrash metal, Miami freestyle, dream-pop, experimental, lo-fi and pop-rock. They have been compared to other bands such as OMD, Depeche Mode, Joy Division, New Order, and The Cure.

== Discography ==
Violens have released 2 studio albums, 1 EP, and 2 mixtapes from 2008 to 2012.

=== Studio albums ===
Title	Details
Amoral	Released: October 3, 2010; Label: Friendly Fire Recordings; Formats: CD, Vinyl, digital download
True	Released: May 12, 2012; Label: Slumberland Records; Formats: CD, Vinyl, digital download

=== Extended plays ===
Title	Details
Violens	Released: October 27, 2008; Label: Deadly People; Formats: CD, digital download

=== Miscellaneous ===
Title	Details
Winter 2009 Mixtape	Released: 2009; Label: self-released; Type: Mixtape; Formats: CD, digital download
Summer 2010 Mixtape	Released: 2010; Label: self-released; Type: Mixtape; Formats: CD, digital download
Nine Songs	Released: 2011; Label: self-released; Formats: digital download
