= Honeybunch =

US musical group

- Origin: Providence, Rhode Island, United States
- Genres: Indie pop
- Years active: Since 1987
- Labels: Bus Stop, Slumberland, K, Summershine
- Members: Jeffrey Underhill; Peter Reilly; Christine Jansky
- Past members: Chris Adams; Frank Mullen; Claudia Gonson; Lisa Underhill; Rafael Attias; Ron Marinick

Honeybunch is an indie pop band from Providence, Rhode island formed in 1987 by future Velvet Crush member Jeffrey Underhill, releasing a string of records before splitting up in 1995. The band reformed in 2003.

== History ==
The band was formed in 1987 by Jeffrey Underhill (vocals, guitar), with Peter Reilly (bass, vocals), Christine Jansky (drums), Chris Adams (keyboards), & Claudia Gonson (drums). The band's debut release was the "Hey Blue Sky!" single on Bus Stop Records in 1989. The band then moved on to Slumberland Records, who issued the next two singles in 1990-1991. Several more releases followed on Summershine, and Four-Letter Words, with the last on K Records. Borchardt (Underhill) also played in Velvet Crush from 1989 - 1996 . He also contributed to various other projects including singing on the first album by The 6ths, and playing guitar on Pernice Brothers & related records, Doug Shepherd's band, the 'Mericans, the Masons, Cosmic Gospel Hour, Long Trees, and Death Vessel .

A compilation of the band's work was issued in 1997, Time Trials 1987-1995 on Summershine in the US, and Elefant in Spain.

The band were a major influence on many American indie pop and "cuddlecore" bands that followed, with Allmusic stating "their smooth, minimal three-piece pop approach and independent aesthetics served as a template for countless other scenes and projects".

The band continued on with a new line-up of Jeffrey Underhill (vocals, guitar), Lisa Underhill (vocals, keyboards) and Rafael Attias (guitar), for a new EP on Bus Stop in 2003. The EP was described by the Boston Phoenix as "vintage pop, with flourishes of rootsiness, the Association, and the early electronic pop of Depeche Mode". PopMatters said of the EP "Honeybunch is a perfect moniker for such sweet tasting music".

== Discography ==
=== Singles ===
- "Hey Blue Sky!" (1989) Bus Stop
- "Candy Breath" (1990) Slumberland
- "Crooked Mile" (flexi) (1991) Four Letter Words
- "Mine Your Own Business" (1991) Slumberland
- "Walking Into Walls" (1991) Summershine
- "Nothing But Trouble" (flexi) (1991) Milky Way
- "Endure Me" (flexi) (1992) Four Letter Words
- "Count Your Blessings" (1994) K
- Honeybunch EP (2003) Bus Stop

=== Albums ===
- Time Trials 1987-1995 (1997) Summershine, Elefant Records
