= Beatnik Filmstars =

British Lo-fi pop group

- Origin: Bristol, England
- Genres: Lo-fi, indie rock
- Years active: 1990–1998, 2004–2008
- Labels: La-Di-Da; Mobstar; Merge; The Track & Field Organisation; The international Lo-Fi Underground; Slumberland
- Past members: Andrew Jarrett; Jon Kent; Jeremy Butler; Andy Henderson; John Austin; Tim Rippington; Ian Roughley; Jerry Francis; Tom Adams; Geoff Gorton; Maurice Roche
- Website: beatnikfilmstars.co.uk

Beatnik Filmstars were a British Lo-fi pop group formed in Bristol in 1990. After splitting up in 1998, going on to side projects Kyoko and Bluebear, they re-formed in 2004, releasing several more albums before splitting again in 2008.

== History ==
Singer Guitarist Andrew Arthur Jarrett started Beatnik Filmstars when the band he was previously in (The Groove Farm) split up. Formed in 1990, the first line up also featured former Groove Farm members Jon Kent (guitar) and Jeremy (Jez) Butler (Drums) along with bass player Andy Henderson.

The band's first album Maharishi was released in 1991. It found them getting lumped into the shoegazing scene, with songs that featured loud/quiet/loud passages, and swirly guitar sounds. But Jarrett was more influenced by US sounding bands and the band soon broke away from their 'shoegaze' phase.

Their second and third albums (Laid Back & English and Astronaut House) found them experimenting with more Lo-Fi sounds and guitar noise. Released on the UK indie label La Di da Records, and newly formed La Di Da/Caroline Records in the USA. The band had now changed line up with John Austin and Tim Rippington (formerly of The Flatmates and 5 Year Plan) both joining as guitarists replacing Kent. And Ian Roughley taking over drums. While Henderson was replaced by Jez Francis on bass. By the time the band had released their next album Beezer (a collection of singles and sessions) on the US label Slumberland, Tom Adams had replaced Roughley on drums. The band's first US tour was supporting The Flaming Lips after hooking up with US management Hellfire.

The next album Phase 3 was to be one of the band's biggest sellers. Released on their own Mobstar label in the UK and the independent No Life Records in the US, reviews commented on the lo-fi recording quality and the pop style songs, with one reviewer calling the band "the English Guided By Voices", and others making similar comparisons. The band were also compared to Sebadoh, Pavement, Sonic Youth, and The Fall. John Peel was a big supporter of the band on their home turf and between 1994 and 1998 they recorded five Peel sessions, as well as once being invited to sit in and chat with him during one of his broadcasts. The next album In Hospitalable was released on US label Merge Records. Again reviews were mostly positive, although most referred to the album title as In Hospitable!.

This was followed by one more album Boss Disque again released on Merge Records and also the German label Noise-o-lution. Their second tour of the US found them supporting Merge label mates and label owners Superchunk, as well as one show with Guided by Voices. The band's albums were selling well, and making headway in the college radio charts, but the band were finding it a struggle back on home ground. During a tour of Germany in 1998 the band cracked and fell to pieces. Jarrett, Adams and Austin went on to record three albums of lo-fi quietcore music under the name Kyoko. But these failed to sell well despite getting good reviews. Jarrett also recorded as Bluebear, releasing an album and two EPs in 2002.

=== Reformation ===
In 2004 Jarrett brought Beatnik Filmstars back to life with Rippington and Adams back in place along with new members Geoff Gorton (bass) and Maurice Roache (keyboards). The band released their attempt at a pure pop record on the UK's Track & Field Indie label. Jarrett later described it as 'a half successful album'.

Another collection album Barking followed on The International Lo-Fi Underground, collecting together various singles and unused tracks. The next album Shenaniganism (Tape Hiss & Other Imperfections) was released in 2007, with the first 500 CD's each coming with a hand made sleeve. But the band was once again beginning to feel boxed into style and the band's final album The Purple Fez Club 72 saw them breaking away to a more mellow sound, with hints of alt country seeping into their pop songs, the band now being compared with Lambchop. Again reviews were mostly favourable, but the band were finding it hard to connect with any labels or people with clout enough to help them move forward, so after one final download only album, Broken Bones, Jarrett called time for good.

Now working under the name Our Arthur, Jarrett continues to write and perform pop songs and includes in live shows, songs from his time with both Beatnik Filmstars and The Groove Farm.

== Discography ==
=== Albums ===
- Maharishi (1991), Big Sky
- Laid-back and English (1993), La-Di-Da
- Astronaut House (1994), La-Di-Da
- Phase 3 (1997), Mobstar
- In Hospitalable (1997), Merge
- Boss Disque (1998), Merge
- Forensic Evidence Suggests Foul Play (2006), Zenith Consol Tone
- In Great Shape (2006), The Track & Field Organisation
- Shenaniganism (Tape Hiss and Other Imperfections) (2007), The International Lo-Fi Underground
- The Purple Fez 72 Club Social (2008), Satisfaction

=== Mini-albums ===
- All Pop Stars Are Talentless Slags (1997), Mobstar/Scratch

=== Compilations ===
- Beezer (1995), Slumberland/Mobstar
- Barking (A Collection of Oddities) (2007), The International Lo-Fi Underground
- Left Hooks (Songs That Got Nowhere) (2007), The International Lo-Fi Underground - A collection of unreleased tracks & out-takes
- Cat Scan Aces (2007), Panda

=== Singles, EPs ===
- "Clothes" (1992), Summershine
- Summer Party II Bomb EP (1993), Tranquil (flexi-disc)
- Revolt into Style EP (1993), La-Di-Da
- Lap Dog Kiss EP (1993), La-Di-Da
- "Bigot Sponger Haircut Policy" (1994), Mobstar
- "Apathetic English Swine" (1994), La-Di-Da
- Bridegrooms EP (1995), Lo-Fi Recordings
- New Boyfriend And Black Suit EP (1995), Mobstar
- Pink Noize EP (1995), Slumberland
- Blue Noize EP (1996), Happy Go Lucky
- Supremer Queener EP (1996), Mobstar
- Off-White Noize EP (1998), Merge
- Curious Role Model EP (2007), The International Lo-Fi Underground
- Wild-eyed & Restless & Free EP (2007), The International Lo-Fi Underground
- Tap Oh Nix EP (2007), The International Lo-Fi Underground (3" CD)
- Boyracer/Beatnik Filmstars split EP (2007), 555 Recordings – split with Boyracer
- "Slow Decay"/"Hospital Ward" (2008), The International Lo-Fi Underground
- "Slow Decay"/"Crushed" (2009), Satisfaction

=== Kyoko ===
Albums

- One:Mini (1999), Mobstar (mini-album)
- Co-incidental Music (2001), 555 Music
- Unpure Disco (2001), Pet Sounds

Singles

- "17 Stitches" (1999), Mobstar

=== Bluebear ===
- Brain Dead A&R Man Blues EP (2002), Mobstar
- Food Fight at the Last Chance Saloon (2002), Mobstar
- Lo-Fidelity Radio Friendly Summer Hit (2002), Mobstar
