= Henry's Dress =

Rock band from New Mexico

- Genre: Noise pop
- Years active: 1993–1997
- Label: Slumberland Records
- Past members: Amy Linton; Matt Hartman; Hayyim Sanchez

Henry's Dress was an American noise pop band from Albuquerque, New Mexico (later moving to San Francisco, California), consisting of Amy Linton and Matt Hartman, who both acted as singer, guitarist and drummer at various times, and Hayyim Sanchez as bassist, which was formed in 1993. They were signed to Slumberland Records who released the band's debut single, a split single with Tiger Trap, a self-titled ten-inch EP, and acclaimed full-length Bust 'Em Green. They toured with Rocketship, with whom they released a split 7-inch, and then disbanded in 1997. Linton was later in The Aislers Set and Go Sailor.

The band's influence has been observed in the work of Los Angeles-based art rock band Julie.

== Musical style and influences ==
Some of the band's songs incorporated elements of surf punk, garage rock and girl group music. The influence of American punk rock band the Ramones is apparent in the group's sound. The band's vocals have drawn comparisions to the band Josey and the Pussycats from the American animated television series of the same name. AllMusic stated that "when each song is happening, the differences between the styles is entirely obliterated into a single, bulldogging nirvana, a car crash of pop."

== Discography ==
- "1620" (7", Wish I Was a Slumberland Record, November 1993)
- "Astronautical Music Festival" (Split 7" w/ Tiger Trap, Slumberland Records, February 1994)
- "Henry's Dress" (10", Slumberland Records, April 1995)
- "All This Time for Nothing" (Split 7" w/ Flake, 1995)
- Bust 'Em Green (LP, Slumberland Records, March 1996)
- "Over 21" (Split 7" w/ Rocketship, Wish I Was a Slumberland Record, May 1996)
