= Evans the Death =

English indie rock band

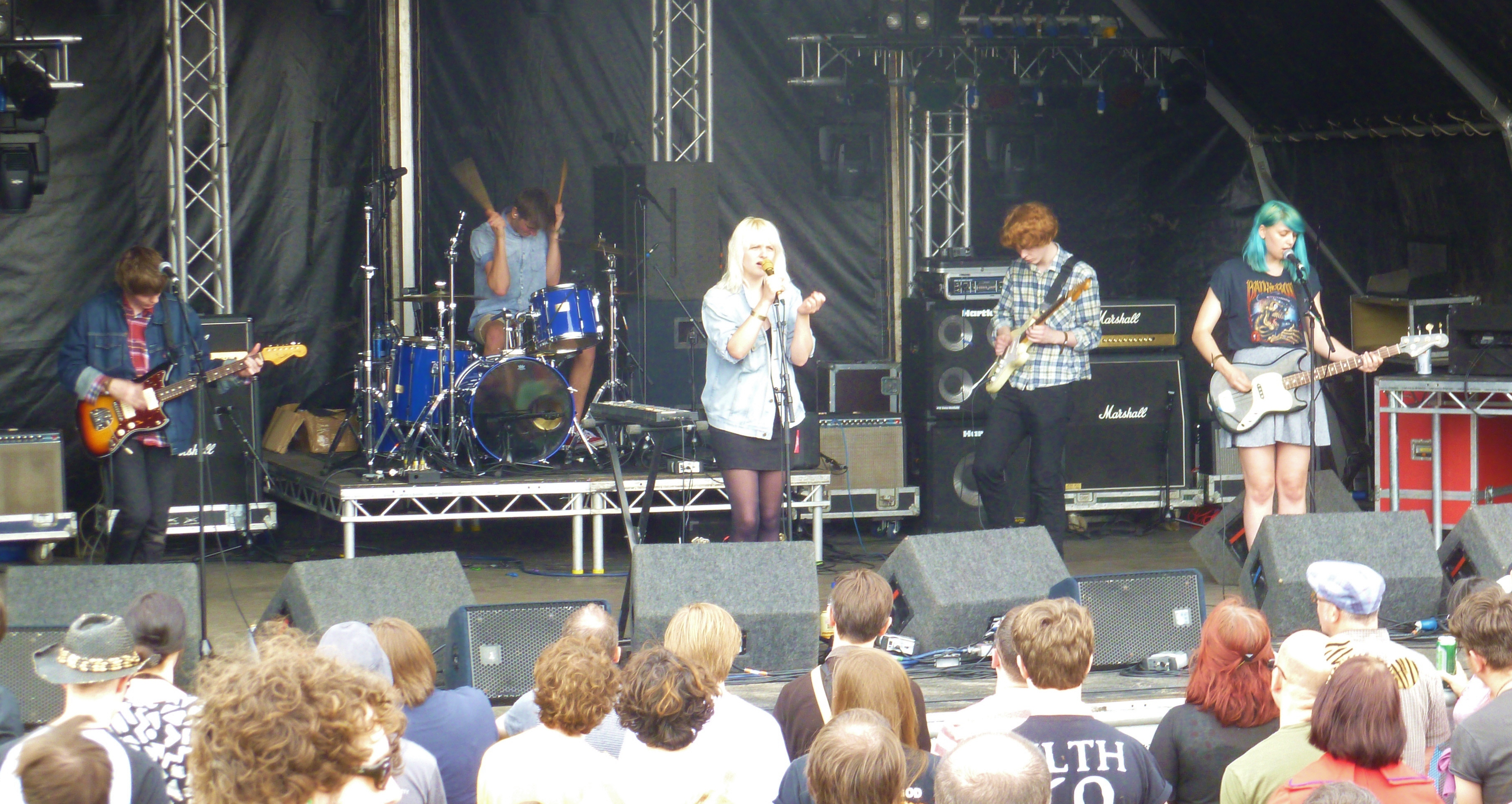
- Evans the Death in 2012.

Background information
- Origin: London, England
- Genre: Indie rock
- Years active: 2011–2017
- Labels: Fortuna Pop! (UK); Slumberland (US)
- Members: Katherine Whitaker; Dan Moss; James Burkitt; Daniel Raphael; Olly Moss
- Past members: Robert Mitson; Alanna McArdle; Matt Gill
- Website: www.evansthedeath.co.uk

Evans the Death were an English indie rock band formed in London in 2011. The band consisted of brothers Dan and Olly Moss (guitars), Katherine Whitaker (vocals), Daniel Raphael (bass) and James Burkitt (drums). They released three albums.

== Career ==
Their debut self-titled full-length album was released on 2 April 2012 via Fortuna Pop! and was produced by ex-Test Icicles guitarist Rory Atwell. The album was preceded by two singles, double A-Side "I'm So Unclean/Threads", on Fortuna Pop! on 6 September 2011 and "Telling Lies" on 27 February 2012. The album received critical acclaim, with Rolling Stone commenting "Raw emotion blends with slashing, whirling guitars to inject paralysis with weird power" and Q Magazine praising the way in which the band "Manage to make humdrum everyday existence sound quite magical.". Artrocker premiered a stream of the album a week prior to release. Throughout 2012, the band toured with bands including The Pains Of Being Pure At Heart, The Wave Pictures, Let's Wrestle, and Trailer Trash Tracys, prompting Clash Magazine to hail them as "one of the most exciting prospects on the [live] circuit".

The band's name references the undertaker in Dylan Thomas' Under Milk Wood. The band's late 2012 "Catch Your Cold" single featured a cameo appearance from comedian Stewart Lee on its B-side. In 2013 the band purposely distanced themselves from the indie-pop movement while they were going through a number of line-up changes.

Their second album, Expect Delays, was released on 3 March 2015.

Olly Moss released his debut solo release Beach Bodies:2008-2014, as Smiling Disease, on Memorials of Distinction on 5 April 2015.

Vanilla, the band's third album, was released in July 2016.

On 23 August 2017 they announced they were disbanding, with a final show planned for 23 September.

== Discography ==
=== Albums ===
- Evans the Death (Fortuna Pop! UK /Slumberland U.S., 2012)
- Expect Delays (Fortuna Pop! UK /Slumberland U.S., 2015)
- Vanilla (Fortuna Pop! UK, 2016)

=== Singles ===
- "I'm So Unclean" / "Threads" (Fortuna Pop! UK /Slumberland U.S., 6 September 2011)
- "Telling Lies" (Fortuna Pop! UK /Slumberland U.S., 27 February 2012)
- "Catch Your Cold" (Fortuna Pop! UK /Slumberland U.S., 15 October 2012)
