= Sarandon (band) =

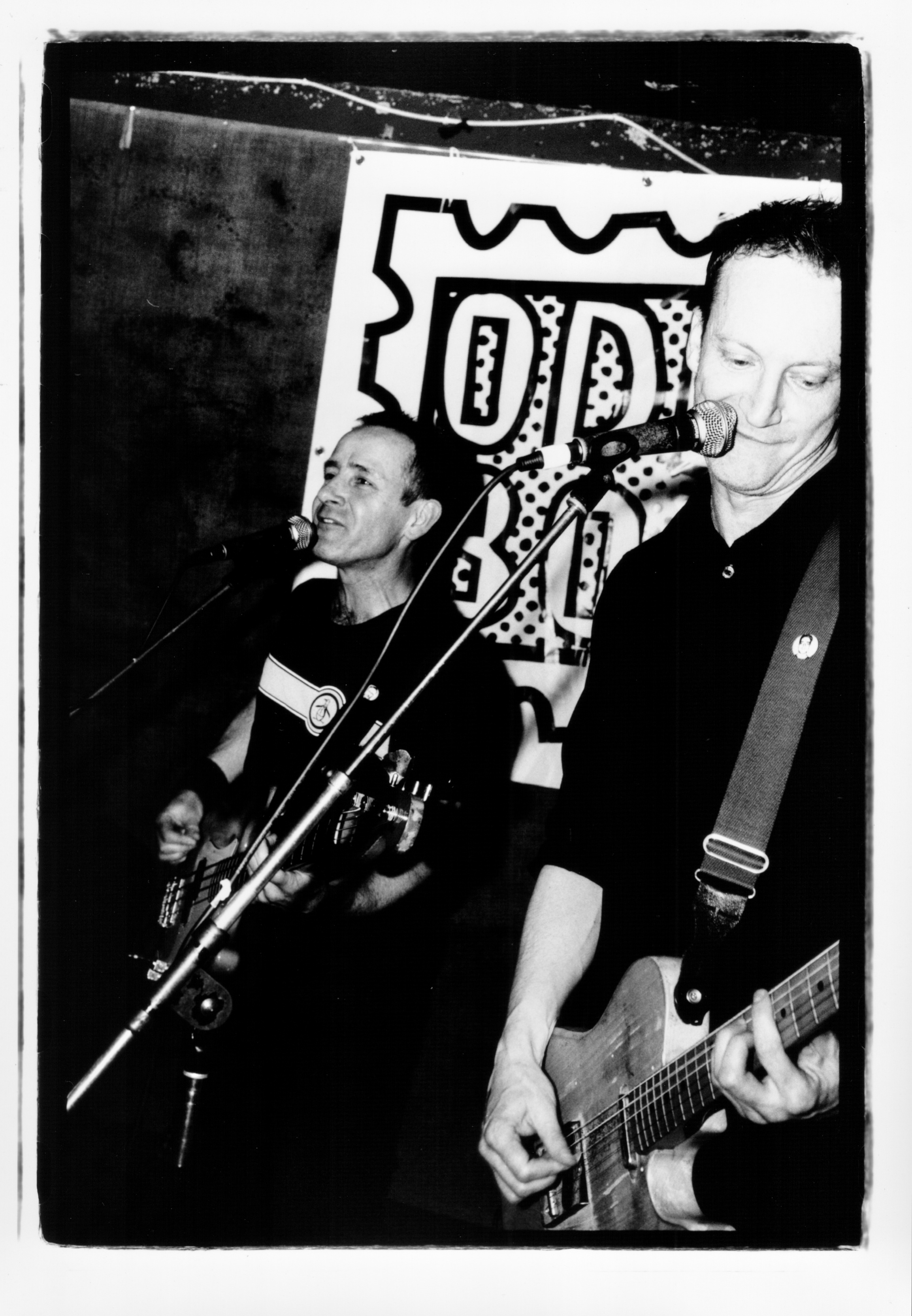
- Sarandon in 2011

Background information
- Origin: London, England
- Genres: Indie rock, post-punk revival
- Years active: 2003 - present
- Labels: Wrath, Slumberland, HHBTM, Odd Box
- Members: Simon Williams; Alan Brown; Tom Greenhalgh
- Past members: Joe Morris; Stephen Gilchrist; Simon Poole; James Higgott

Sarandon are an English indie rock group, formed in London in 2003, who have so far released two albums.

== History ==
Initially formed by singer/guitarist Simon Williams (aka Crayola), drummer James Higgott (formerly of HOST) and bass player Joe Morris (also of The Reverse), the group played their debut show in central London after having rehearsed only once before going into the studio to record their first record, The Miniest Album.

Much was made of the debut record being a 7" vinyl single containing 7 songs and so the band decided to release a series of such records. After the second release, The Big Flame (named in honour of their favourite band), James was replaced on drums by Simon Poole, a longtime musical colleague of Crayola. The new line-up recorded two further 7 track 7" records, The Feminist Third and The June Bride, before having all four records compiled into a single CD release entitled The Completist's Library by the record label Wrath in the UK and HHBTM in the US. All four records were produced by Anthony Chapman, formerly of Collapsed Lung, who has also produced Bis, Spearmint, Ten Benson, Klaxons, The Keatons and Crazy Gods of Endless Noise. The June Bride takes its name from another of the band's favourite bands and featured guest appearances from Big Flame's Alan Brown and The June Brides' Phil Wilson. The collection has been described as "an awful lot of fun".

In October 2006 the band were joined by Stephen Gilchrist, replacing Simon Poole on drums - Stephen is best known as Graham Coxon's drummer. He also performs in his own group, Stuffy & the Fuses, as well as working as a drum tutor.

In January 2007 Joe decided to take a sabbatical and was replaced by Alan Brown - a founder member of Big Flame and The Great Leap Forward, who has played drums with A Witness and more recently performed as one third of Marshall Smith.

Stephen got too busy for his own good and in September 2007 was replaced by Tom Greenhalgh on drums. The new line-up immediately recorded a cover version of an old June Brides song, "Every Conversation" and a new studio album entitled Kill Twee Pop!, which was released early in 2008 on Slumberland Records. The album was positively received by critics, and has been described as "a campaign ad to return to the avant punk rock intonations of the late 70’s and early 80’s.", "outlandish, concise and exuberant enough to attract many lovers of rhythmically and lyrically sharp rock", and "like an XTC album played by bonkers Ritalin unachievers", with SoundsXP saying "both for restoring the reputation of a certain strand of 80s indiepop and in making refreshingly askew new music with a wicked sense of humour, Sarandon ought to be applauded".

Sarandon have recorded sessions for BBC Radio 1's One Music show and Marc Riley’s BBC 6 Music show, Rocket Science.

In October 2009 John Robb's book Death To Trad Rock was published by Cherry Red Books. It includes a whole chapter devoted to Crayola and Sarandon and their place in the history of the UK independent music scene. As a celebration of the book a 7" single was released by Slumberland Records, a split between Sarandon and Robb's former band The Membranes.

August 2010 saw the band go into the new studio complex at Bucks University, again with Anthony Chapman producing, to record a new album. Entitled Sarandon's Age Of Reason, the album is something of a concept album with narration provided by The Shend of The Cravats and The Very Things. They were joined on piano by Rhodri Marsden and the album is introduced by Robert Lloyd of The Nightingales. The album was released in early 2011 by Slumberland Records in the USA and Odd Box Records in the UK.

Sarandon continue to record and perform sporadically.

== Band members ==
=== Current members ===
- Simon Williams - Vocals/guitar (2003 – present)
- Alan Brown - Bass (2007 – present)
- Tom Greenhalgh - Drums (2007 – present)

=== Past members ===
- Joe Morris (2003–2007)
- Stephen Gilchrist (2006–2007)
- Simon Poole (2004–2006)
- James Higgott (2003–2004)

== Discography ==
=== Singles ===
- The Miniest Album (Jul 2004, Run Out, RUN001 [7"])
- The Big Flame (June 2005, Banazan, BAN20 [7"])
- The Feminist Third (Dec 2005, Wrath, WRATH32 [7"])
- The June Bride (May 2006, Wrath, WRATH38 [7"])
- "Joe's Record" (October 2007, Slumberland, SLR072 [7"])
- "Every Conversation" (split with Phil Wilson) (December 2007, Every Conversation, March 2008 [7"])
- "Other People's Records" (December 2008, Little Car Records, MINI01 [7"])
- "Spike Milligan's Tape Recorder" (split with The Membranes) (October 2009, Slumberland, SLR109 [7"])

=== Albums ===
- The Completist’s Library (Aug 2006, Wrath, WRATH40CD [CD]; Jan 2007, HHBTM, HHBTM083 [CD])
- Kill Twee Pop! (April 2008, Slumberland [10"], [CD])
- Sarandon's Age Of Reason (January 2011, Slumberland [12"], Odd Box Records [CD])
