= The School (British band) =

Welsh indie pop group

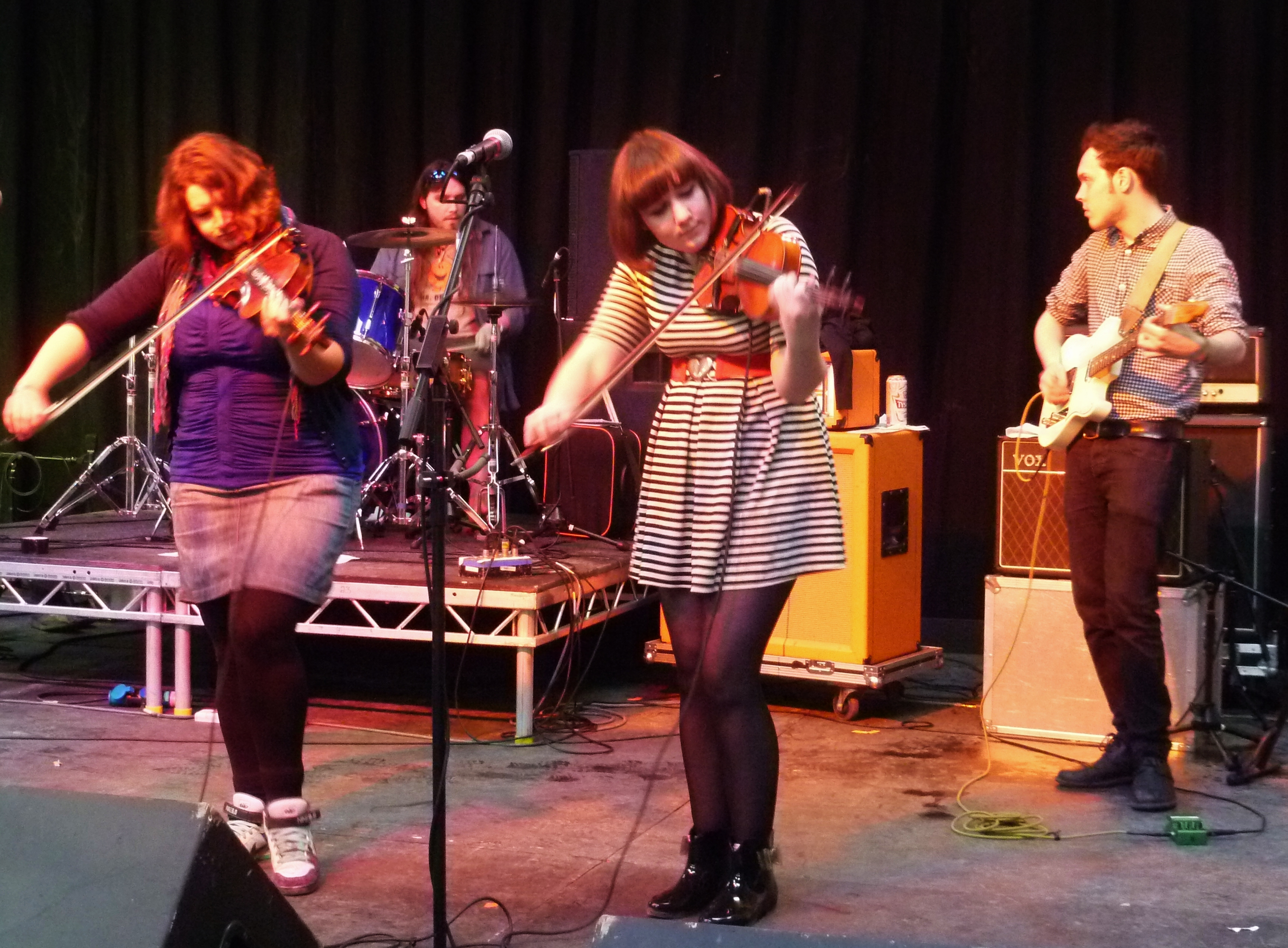

Background information
- Origin: Cardiff, Wales
- Genres: Pop
- Years active: 2007–present
- Label: Elefant Records
- Members: Liz Hunt; Ryan Cox; Steph Doble; Fran Dimech; Kay Russant; Kit Denison; Andy Regan

The School are a band based in Wales, founded in 2007. In 2008, they released their first single, All I Wanna Do, and their first EP, Let It Slip. Their debut album was Loveless Unbeliever, and was released in 2010. Their second album was titled Reading Too Much Into Things Like Everything, and was released in 2012. Their label is Elefant Records.
