= Slumberland Records =

- Founded: 1989
- Genre: Indie pop
- Country of origin: U.S.
- Location: Oakland, California
- Official website: slumberlandrecords.com

Slumberland Records is an American independent record label, formed in 1989 in Washington, D.C., and based in Oakland, California. The label has released recordings by Velocity Girl, Honeybunch, Lilys, Tony Molina, Stereolab, Evans The Death, St. Christopher, Boyracer, Beatnik Filmstars, 14 Iced Bears, and The Pains of Being Pure at Heart.

== History ==
Inspired by independent punk labels such as K Records, Slumberland was founded in 1989 as a collective effort consisting of members of D.C. area bands Velocity Girl and Big Jesus Trash Can as a mecca for indie pop bands, seldom heard outside of the K Records label.

The debut Slumberland Records release was "What Kind of Heaven Do You Want?", a shared 7" featuring early line-ups of Velocity Girl, Black Tambourine, and Powderburns. The record was sold in December 1989, limited to 1000 copies with some sort of hand coloring.

By 1992, Slumberland Records was exclusively managed by Michael Schulman, who had been a DJ on WMUC-FM. That year operations were moved from Silver Spring, Maryland to Berkeley, California.

In 1993, Slumberland Records started a in-company record promotion label called "I Wish I Was a Slumberland Record", using colored vinyl instead of black vinyl for up-and-coming bands. The debut release for the WISH label was Sleepyhead's "Sick of Heaven" 7".

In 2001, Slumberland Records went on a temporary hiatus after The Saturday People self-titled full-length but returned in 2003 to release the vinyl version of The Aislers Set third full-length How I Learned to Write Backwards.

The label once again returned to active status in 2006, releasing albums by The Lodger, Sarandon, Crystal Stilts, Cause Co-Motion!, as well as numerous 7" singles.

== Catalog ==
=== DRYL catalog discography (1989–1992) ===
Release Number	Artist	Title	Format	Released
DRYL 1	V/A	What Kind of Heaven Do You Want	7"	Dec 1989
DRYL 2	Powderburns	Powderburns	12"	Apr 1990
DRYL 3	Whorl	Mind Revolution	7"	Mar 1990
DRYL 4	Velocity Girl	I Don't Care If You Go	7"	Aug 1990
DRYL 5	Honeybunch	No More I Told You So's	7"	Mar 1991
DRYL 6	Jane Pow	Warm Room	7"	Feb 1991
DRYL 7	Lilys	February Fourteenth	7"	Mar 1991
DRYL 8				
DRYL 9	Black Tambourine	By Tomorrow	7"	Nov 1991
DRYL 10	Velocity Girl	My Forgotten Favorite	7"	Jan 1992
DRYL 11	Whorl	Maybe It's Better	7"	Feb 1992
DRYL 12	Lorelei	The Bitter Air	7"	Feb 1992
DRYL 13	Small Factory	What To Want	7"	Apr 1992
DRYL 14	Honeybunch	Mind Your Own Business	7"	Jun 1992
DRYL 15	Swirlies	Didn't Understand	7"	Feb 1992

=== SLR catalog discography (1992–present) ===
Release Number	Artist	Title	Format	Released
SLR 08	V/A	Just A Taste	CD	Mar 1996
SLR 16	Linda Smith	Til Another Time	7"	Nov 1993
SLR 17	The Ropers (band)	Sunbathe EP	7"	May 1993
SLR 18	Sleepyhead	Punk Rock City USA	7"	May 1993
SLR 19	St. Christopher	Radio France Sessions EP	7"	Nov 1993
SLR 20	Lilys	In The Presence of Nothing	LP	Sep 1992
SLR 21	Sleepyhead	Punk Rock U.S.A.	LP	Apr 1993
SLR 22	Stereolab	Switched On	LP	Oct 1992
SLR 23	Velocity Girl	6 Song EP	CD	Feb 1993
SLR 24	Stereolab	John Cage Bubblegum	7"	Jan 1993
SLR 25	Jane Pow	Love It, Be It / State	CD	Jun 1993
SLR 26	Small Factory	Lose Your Way	7"	May 1994
SLR 27	Bright Colored Lights	Open Your Eyes	7"	Oct 2000
SLR 28	Boyracer	More Songs About Frustration and Self Hate	LP	Jul 1994
SLR 29	The Earthmen	Cool Chick #59	7"	May 1993
SLR 30	The Parasites (band)	Something To Hold Onto	7"	Sep 1993
SLR 31	V/A	Why Popstars Can't Dance	CD/2xLP	Oct 1994
SLR 32	Lorelei	Asleep EP	7"/CD	Oct 1993
SLR 33	Tiger Trap / Henry's Dress	Astronautical Music Festival	7"	Feb 1994
SLR 34	Henry's Dress	Henry's Dress EP	10"/CD	Jan 1995
SLR 35	Boyracer	AUL 36X EP	7"	Jan 1994
SLR 36	Go Sailor	Long Distance	7"	Jul 1995
SLR 37	Black Tambourine	Complete Recordings	10"/CD	Apr 1999
SLR 38	The Ropers	I Don't Mind EP	7"/CD	May 1994
SLR 39	Belreve	Belreve EP	7"/CD	Jan 1995
SLR 40	Rocketship	A Certain Smile, A Certain Sadness	LP/CD	Jan 1996
SLR 41	The Softies	Loveseat	7"	Jul 1994
SLR 42	KG	Embryo	7"	1999
SLR 43	Beatnik Filmstars	Pink Noize	7"	May 1995
SLR 44	Lorelei	Everyone Must Touch The Stove	LP/CD	Sep 1995
SLR 45	Glo-Worm	Wishing Well	7"	May 1995
SLR 46	Hood	Cabled Linear Traction	LP/CD	Jun 1995
SLR 47	The Softies	The Softies	10"/CD	Mar 1996
SLR 48	Boyracer	We Are Made of the Same Wood	10"/CD	Jan 1996
SLR 49	Boyracer	One Side of Boyracer	7"	Oct 1996
SLR 50	The Ropers	All The Time	LP/CD	Sep 1995
SLR 51	Nord Express	Nord Express	12"/CD	Mar 1996
SLR 52	The Aislers Set	Been Hiding	7"	Feb 1992
SLR 53	The Ropers	Revolver	7"	Sep 1995
SLR 54	Henry's Dress	Bust 'Em Green	LP/CD	Feb 1996
SLR 55	The Aislers Set	Terrible Things Happen	LP/CD	Sep 1998
SLR 56	Nord Express	Sharky	7"	Jan 1997
SLR 57	Nord Express	Central	LP/CD	May 1997
SLR 58	Beatnik Filmstars	Beezer	CD	Feb 1996
SLR 59	Hood	Silent '88	LP/CD	Sep 1996
SLR 60	The Saturday People	Slipping Through Your Fingertips	7"	Feb 2000
SLR 61	The Suncharms	Red Dust	7"	Oct 2018
SLR 62	The Aislers Set	The Last Match	LP/CD	May 2000
SLR 63	The Saturday People / The Clientele	split	7"	Jul 2001
SLR 64	Amy Linton & Stewart Anderson	The Lights Are Out	7"	May 2000
SLR 65	14 Iced Bears	In the Beginning	CD	Aug 2001
SLR 66	The Aislers Set	The Red Door	7"	May 2001
SLR 67	The Saturday People	The Saturday People	LP/CD	Nov 2001
SLR 68	The Aislers Set	How I Learned To Write Backwards	LP/CD	Feb 2003
SLR 69	The How	Happy Matt	7"	Sep 2006
SLR 70	The Crabapples	Crabapples For Change	7"	Sep 2006
SLR 71	The Lodger	Grown-Ups	LP/CD	Jun 2007
SLR 72	Sarandon	Joe's Record	7"	Oct 2007
SLR 73	Longhalsmottagningen	s/t	7"	Feb 2008
SLR 74	Roy Moller / The Hermit Crabs	Searching For The Now 1 split	7"	Feb 2008
SLR 75	The Aislers Set / The How	split	7"	Oct 2008
SLR 76	Bye! / The Happy Couple	Searching For The Now 2 split	7"	Feb 2008
SLR 77	Sarandon	Kill Twee Pop!	10"/CD	Apr 2008
SLR 78	Phil Wilson	Industrial Strength	2x7"	Aug 2008
SLR 79	Sexy Kids	"Sisters Are Forever"	7"	Nov 2008
SLR 80	The Lodger	Life Is Sweet	LP/CD	May 2008
SLR 81	A Sunny Day In Glasgow / The Sunny Street	Searching For The Now Vol. 3	Split 7"	Jun 2008
SLR 82	The Pains of Being Pure At Heart / Summer Cats	Searching For The Now Vol. 4	Split 7"	Jun 2008
SLR 83	Cause Co-Motion!	I Lie Awake EP	7"	Sep 2008
SLR 84	Crystal Stilts	Alight of Night	LP/CD	Oct 2008
SLR 85	The Pains of Being Pure At Heart	"Everything With You"	7"	Oct 2008
SLR 86	Bricolage	"Turn U Over"	7"	Nov 2008
SLR 87	Cause Co-Motion!	It's Time!	CD	Oct 2008
SLR 88	Bricolage	Bricolage	LP/CD	May 2009
SLR 89	The Pains of Being Pure At Heart	The Pains of Being Pure At Heart	LP/CD	Feb 2009
SLR 90	The Bats	"Don't You Rise"	7"	Oct 2009
SLR 91	Crystal Stilts	"Love Is a Wave"	7"	Mar 2009
SLR 92	The Pains of Being Pure At Heart	"Young Adult Friction"	7"	Mar 2009
SLR 93	Cause Co-Motion!	Because Because Because	12"	May 2009
SLR 94	Liechtenstein / The Faintest Ideas	Searching For The Now 5 Vol. 5	Split 7"	Aug 2009
SLR 95	The School / George Washington Brown	Searching For The Now Vol. 6	Split 7"	Aug 2009
SLR 96	Liechtenstein	Survival Strategies In A Modern World	10"/CD	Jun 2009
SLR 97	Gregory Webster	"The Promised Land"	7"	Oct 2009
SLR 98	The Champagne Socialists	"Blue Genes"	7"	Jul 2009
SLR 99	Dum Dum Girls	"Bhang Bhang, I'm A Burnout"	7"	Nov 2010
SLR 100				
SLR 101	Summer Cats	Songs For Tuesdays	LP/CD	Jul 2009
SLR 102	Brown Recluse	The Soft Skin	12"	Sep 2009
SLR 103	The Pains of Being Pure At Heart	"Come Saturday"	7"	Sep 2009
SLR 104	Sic Alps	"L. Mansion"	7"	Aug 2009
SLR 105	The Pains of Being Pure At Heart	"Higher Than The Stars"	7"/12"/Remix-12"/CD	Sep 2009
SLR 106	Pants Yell!	Received Pronunciation	LP/CD	Nov 2009
SLR 107	Devon Williams	"Sufferer"	7"	Sep 2009
SLR 108	Brilliant Colors	Introducing	LP/CD	Nov 2009
SLR 109	Sarandon / The Membranes	"Spike Milligan's Tape Recorder"	Split 7"	Oct 2009
SLR 110	Frankie Rose	"Thee Only One"	7"	Oct 2009
SLR 111	Black Tambourine	Black Tambourine	LP/CD	Mar 2010
SLR 112	Chin Chin	Sound of the Westway	LP	Apr 2010
SLR 113	Manatee	"Indecision"	7"	May 2010
SLR 114	Summer Cats	"Your Timetable"	7"	Mar 2010
SLR 115	Brilliant Colors	"Never Mine"	7"	Apr 2010
SLR 116	The Lodger	Flashbacks	LP/CD	Apr 2010
SLR 117	Neverever	Angelic Swells	LP/CD	May 2010
SLR 118	Tender Trap	"Do You Want A Boyfriend?"	7"	Jun 2010
SLR 119	Tender Trap	Dansette Dansette	LP/CD	Jun 2010
SLR 120	The Pains of Being Pure At Heart	"Say No To Love"	7"	Jun 2010
SLR 121	Procedure Club	Doomed Forever	LP/CD	Jun 2010
SLR 122	Spectrals	"7th Date"	7"	Jun 2010
SLR 123	Brown Recluse	Evening Tapestry	LP/CD	Mar 2011
SLR 124	Frankie Rose and The Outs	Frankie Rose and The Outs	LP/CD	Sep 2010
SLR 125	Weekend	Sports	LP/CD	Nov 2010
SLR 126	Crystal Stilts	"Shake the Shackles"	7"	Oct 2010
SLR 127	Phil Wilson	"I Own It"	7"	Oct 2010
SLR 128	Phil Wilson	God Bless Jim Kennedy	LP/CD	Nov 2010
SLR 129	Brave Irene	Brave Irene	12"/CD	Mar 2011
SLR 130	Girls Names / Brilliant Colors	"I Lose" / "You Win"	Split 7"	Nov 2010
SLR 131	Sarandon	Sarandon's Age of Reason	LP/CD	Mar 2011
SLR 132	Crystal Stilts	In Love With Oblivion	LP/CD	Apr 2011
SLR 133	Devon Williams	Euphoria	LP/CD	Aug 2011
SLR 134	The Pains of Being Pure At Heart	"Heart in Your Heartbreak"	7"	Dec 2010
SLR 135	The Pains of Being Pure At Heart	Belong	LP/CD	Mar 2011
SLR 136	Devon Williams	"Your Sympathy"	7"	Jun 2011
SLR 137	Art Museums	"Dancing With A Hole In Your Heart"	7"	Jun 2011
SLR 138	Girls Names	Dead to Me	LP/CD	Apr 2011
SLR 139	Gold-Bears	Are You Falling in Love?	LP/CD	May 2011
SLR 140	The Pains of Being Pure At Heart	"Belong"	7"	Mar 2011
SLR 141	Weekend	"End Times"	7"	May 2011
SLR 142	Terry Malts	I'm Neurotic	LP/CD	Apr 2011
SLR 143	Kids On A Crime Spree	We Love You So Bad	12"/CD	May 2011
SLR 144	Go Sailor	Go Sailor	LP	Jun 2011
SLR 145	Joanna Gruesome	"Sugarcrush"	Digital	Nov 2013
SLR 146	Brilliant Colors	Again and Again	LP/CD	Jul 2011
SLR 147	Big Troubles	"Sad Girls"	7"	Aug 2011
SLR 148	Big Troubles	Romantic Comedy	LP/CD	Sep 2011
SLR 149	Frankie Rose	"Know Me"	7"	Jan 2012
SLR 150	Frankie Rose	Interstellar	LP/CD	Feb 2012
SLR 151	Neverever	Shake-a-Baby	12"/CD	Jan 2012
SLR 152	Veronica Falls	"Bad Feeling"	7"	Aug 2011
SLR 153	Veronica Falls	Veronica Falls	LP/CD	Sep 2011
SLR 154	Spectrals	"Get a Grip"	7"	Oct 2011
SLR 155	Spectrals	Bad Penny	LP/CD	Oct 2011
SLR 156	Sea Lions	Everything You Always Wanted to Know About Sea Lions But Were Afraid to Ask	LP/CD	Nov 2011
SLR 157	Weekend	Red	12"/CD	Sep 2011
SLR 158	English Singles	Backstreet Pages	7"	May 2012
SLR 159	Terry Malts	"Something About You"	7"	Oct 2011
SLR 160	Big Troubles	"She Smiles For Pictures"	7"	Nov 2011
SLR 161	Manatee	"Single Payer Class War"	Flexi 7"	Nov 2011
SLR 162	Devon Williams	"Revelations"	Digital Download	Nov 2011
SLR 163	Terry Malts	Killing Time	LP/CD	Feb 2012
SLR 164	Roommates	"Winnifred"	7"	Mar 2012
SLR 165	Evans The Death	"Telling Lies"	7"	Mar 2012
SLR 166	Evans The Death	Evans The Death	LP/CD	May 2012
SLR 167	Allo Darlin'	"Capricornia"	7"	Mar 2012
SLR 168	Allo Darlin'	Europe	LP/CD	Apr 2012
SLR 169	Violens	True	LP/CD	May 2012
SLR 170	Black Tambourine	OneTwoThreeFour	2x7"	May 2012
SLR 171	Lorelei	Enterprising Sidewalks	LP/CD	Aug 2012
SLR 172	Violens	"Totally True"	7"	Apr 2012
SLR 173	Veronica Falls	"My Heart Beats"	7"	Apr 2012
SLR 174	Echo Lake	Wild Peace	LP/CD	Jun 2012
SLR 175	The June Brides	"A January Moon"	7"	Jun 2012
SLR 176	Girls Names / Weird Dreams	split	7"	Jun 2012
SLR 177	Allo Darlin'	"Europe"	7"	Jun 2012
SLR 178	Allo Darlin'	"Northern Lights"	7"	Oct 2012
SLR 179	The Pains of Being Pure At Heart	"Jeremy"	7"	Oct 2012
SLR 180	Evans The Death	"Catch Your Cold"	7"	Oct 2012
SLR 181	Frankie Rose	Night Swim	CD	Oct 2012
SLR 182	Girls Names	"The New Life"	12"	Nov 2012
SLR 183	Weekend	Jinx	LP/CD	Jun 2013
SLR 184	Wax Idols	Discipline & Desire	LP/CD	Mar 2013
SLR 185	Veronica Falls	Waiting for Something to Happen	LP/CD	Feb 2013
SLR 186	Veronica Falls	"Teenage"	7"	Mar 2013
SLR 187	Girls Names	The New Life	LP/CD	Feb 2013
SLR 188	Golden Grrrls	Golden Grrrls	LP/CD	Mar 2013
SLR 189	The Mantles	Long Enough to Leave	LP/CD	Jun 2013
SLR 190	Devon Williams	Gilding the Lily	LP/CD	June 2014
SLR 191	English Singles	"Ordinary Girls"	7"	May 2013
SLR 192	Kids On A Crime Spree	"Creep the Creeps"	7"	Apr 2013
SLR 193	Spectrals	Sob Story	LP/CD	Jun 2013
SLR 194	Veronica Falls	"Waiting for Something to Happen"	7"	Jun 2013
SLR 195	Terry Malts	Nobody Realizes This Is Nowhere	LP/CD	Sep 2013
SLR 195x	Terry Malts	"I Could Be Happy"	Flexi 7"	Sep 2013
SLR 196	Black Hearted Brother	Stars Are Our Home	LP/CD	Oct 2013
SLR 197	Joanna Gruesome	Weird Sister	LP/CD	Sep 2013
SLR 198	Girls Names	The Next Life EP	12"	Oct 2013
SLR 199	Veronica Falls	"Broken Toy"	7"	Oct 2013
SLR 200	The Proper Ornaments	Wooden Head	LP/CD	Jul 2014
SLR 201	Literature	Chorus	LP/CD	Aug 2014
SLR 202	Tony Molina	Dissed and Dismissed	LP	Mar 2014
SLR 203	Withered Hand	New Gods	LP/CD	Mar 2014
SLR 204	Gold-Bears	Dalliance	LP/CD	June 2014
SLR 205	The Pains of Being Pure at Heart	"Simple and Sure"	7"	June 2014
SLR 206	Terry Malts	Inside EP	7"	Sep 2014
SLR 207	The June Brides	"She Seems Quite Free"	7"	Sep 2014
SLR 208	Allo Darlin'	We Come from the Same Place	LP/CD	Oct 2014
SLR 209	Joanna Gruesome / Perfect Pussy	Astonishing Adventures Comic/Split EP	7"	Nov 2014
SLR 210	The Mantles	"Memory"	7"	Dec 2014
SLR 211	Young Guv	Ripe 4 Luv	LP/CD	Mar 2015
SLR 212	Evans the Death	Expect Delays	LP/CD	Mar 2015
SLR 213	Linden	Rest and Be Thankful	LP/CD	Jun 2015
SLR 214	Joanna Gruesome	Peanut Butter	LP/CD	May 2015
SLR 215	Expert Alterations	Expert Alterations EP	12"	Jun 2015
SLR 216	The Mantles	All Odds End	LP/CD	Oct 2015
SLR 217	Mercury Girls	"Ariana"	7"	May 2016
SLR 218	Bent Shapes	Wolves of Want	LP/CD	Mar 2016
SLR 219	Pete Astor	Spilt Milk	LP	Feb 2016
SLR 220	Mercury Girls / The Spook School / Wildhoney / Tigercats	Continental Drift	Split LP/CD/CS	Aug 2016
SLR 221	Tony Molina	Confront the Truth	LP	Oct 2016
SLR 222	Terry Malts	Lost at the Party	LP	Oct 2016
SLR 223	Real Numbers	Wordless Wonder	LP	Oct 2016
SLR 224	The Proper Ornaments	Foxhole	LP	Jan 2017
SLR 225	Young Guv	Traumatic	7"	Jun 2017
SLR 226	Frankie Rose	Cage Tropical	LP	Aug 2017
SLR 227	The Spook School	Could It Be Different?	LP	Feb 2018
SLR 228	Tony Molina	Kill the Lights	LP	Jul 2018
SLR 229	David Lance Callahan	Strange Lovers	7"	Jan 2019
SLR 230	Dolly Dream	The Way to Heaven	7"	Jan 2019
SLR 231	Rat Columns	Sometimes We're Friends	7"	Oct 2018
SLR 232	D.A. Stern	Aloha Hola	LP	Mar 2018
SLR 233	Smokescreens	Used to Yesterday	LP	Jul 2018
SLR 234	Peel Dream Magazine	Modern Meta Physic	LP	Oct 2018
SLR 235	The Wolfhounds	Hands in the Till: The Complete John Peel Sessions	LP	Aug 2018
SLR 236	Papercuts	Parallel Universe Blues	LP	Oct 2018
SLR 237	Business of Dreams	Ripe for Anarchy	LP	Feb 2019
SLR 238	Various Artists	Nosh Lately? A Tribute to the Beastie Boys	7"	Sep 2018
SLR 239	Wildhoney	Naive Castle	7"	Aug 2019
SLR 240	Jeanines	Jeanines	LP	Jun 2019
SLR 241	East Village	Hotrod Hotel	LP	Jan 2020
SLR 242	Smiles	Gone For Good	7"	Aug 2019
SLR 243	Lake Ruth	Extended Leave	7"	Nov 2019
SLR 244	Failed Flowers	Faces	7"	Nov 2019
SLR 245	Pale Lights	You and I	7"	Apr 2020
SLR 246	Odd Hope	All the Things	7"	Apr 2020
SLR 247	Devon Williams	A Tear in the Fabric	LP	May 2020
SLR 248	Flowers	Erik	7"	Dec 2020
SLR 249	Neutrals	Personal Computing	7"	Dec 2020
SLR 250	The Springfields	Singles 1986-1991	CD	Nov 2019
SLR 251	Peel Dream Magazine	Agitprop Alterna	CD	Apr 2020
SLR 252				
SLR 253	Smokescreens	A Strange Dream	CD	Oct 2020
SLR 254	Real Numbers	Brighter Then	12"	Mar 2021
SLR 255	Lunchbox	After School Special	CD	Oct 2020
SLR 256	Peel Dream Magazine	Moral Panics	12"	Dec 2020
SLR 257	The Reds, Pinks and Purples	Uncommon Weather	LP	Apr 2021
SLR 258	The Umbrellas	The Umbrellas	LP	Aug 2021
SLR 259	Artsick	Fingers Crossed	LP	Jan 2022
SLR 260	Chime School	Chime School	CD	Nov 2021
SLR 261	Kids on a Crime Spree	Fall in Love Not in Line	LP	Jan 2022
SLR 262	Jeanines	Don't Wait for a Sign	LP	Apr 2022
SLR 263	The Reds, Pinks and Purples	Summer at Land's End	LP	Feb 2022
SLR 264				
SLR 265	Papercuts	Past Life Regression	LP	Apr 2022
SLR 266	The Reds, Pinks and Purples	They Only Wanted Your Soul	LP	Oct 2022
SLR 267	Frankie Rose	Love As Projection	LP	Mar 2023
SLR 268				
SLR 269	The Umbrellas	Write It in The Sky	7"	Jun 2022
SLR 270	Tony Jay	Perfect Words	LP	Sep 2023
SLR 271				
SLR 272	Peel Dream Magazine	Pad	LP	Oct 2022
SLR 273	Chime School	Coming To Your Town	7"	Apr 2023
SLR 274	Blue Ocean	Fertile State	LP	Oct 2023
SLR 275				
SLR 276	The Reds, Pinks and Purples	The Town That Cursed Your Name	LP	Mar 2023
SLR 277	Torrey	Torrey	LP	Mar 2023
SLR 278	Jeanines	Each Day	7"	Jul 2023
SLR 279	The Laughing Chimes	Laurel Heights	7"	Sep 2023
SLR 280	Lightheaded	Combustible Gems	LP	May 2024
SLR 281	Birdy	Some Dusty	LP	Jul 2024
SLR 282	The Umbrellas	Fairweather Friend	LP	Jan 2024
SLR 283	Neutrals	New Town Dream	LP	May 2024
SLR 284	Humdrum	Every Heaven	LP	Oct 2024
SLR 285	Lunchbox	Pop and Circumstance	LP	May 2024
SLR 286	The Laughing Chimes	Whispers In The Speech Machine	LP	Jan 2025
SLR 287	Chime School	The Boy Who Ran The Paisley Hotel	LP	Aug 2024
SLR 288	The Reds, Pinks and Purples	Unwishing Well	LP	Apr 2024

=== WISH catalog discography (since 1993) ===
Release Number	Artist	Title	Format	Released
WISH 01	Sleepyhead	Sick of Heaven	7"	Jul 1993
WISH 02	Henry's Dress	1620	7"	Nov 1993
WISH 03	Rose Melberg / Magpies	Cupid / I Want A Love I Can See	7" Flexi	Jul 1994
WISH 04	Jupiter Sun	s/t	one-sided 12"	Aug 1994
WISH 05	Boyracer / The Ropers	split	7"	Jul 1994
WISH 06	Henry's Dress / Rocketship	split	7"	May 1996
WISH 07	The Aislers Set / #Poundsign#	split	7"	Apr 1999
WISH 08	The Aislers Set	The Snow Don't Fall	7"	Dec 2000
WISH 09	14 Iced Bears	Inside	7"	May 2001
WISH 10	The Crabapples	You'll See Me	3.5" Floppy Disk	Sep 2003
WISH 11	The Mantles	Bad Design	7"	Oct 2009
WISH 12	V/A	The First Twenty Years	CD	Nov 2009
WISH 13 / 55551	The How / Boyracer	split	7"	Mar 2010
WISH 14 / Take A Day #4	Go Sailor	Long Distance (Alternate Mix)	7"	Mar 2010
