= Indie pop =

Genre of pop music

- Stylistic origins: Pop; indie rock; post-punk; bubblegum
- Cultural origins: Late 1970s, United Kingdom
- Derivative forms: Alternative pop; chillwave; Shibuya-kei

Subgenres
- Chamber pop; twee pop

Fusion genres
- Indietronica

Local scenes
- Dunedin

Other topics
- Indie rock; alternative dance; alternative R&B; anorak; art pop; avant-pop; C86; dream pop; experimental pop; jangle pop; lo-fi music; new wave; noise pop; pop punk; progressive pop

Indie pop (also typeset as indie-pop or indiepop) is a music genre and subculture that combines guitar pop with a DIY ethic in opposition to the style and tone of mainstream pop music. It originated from British post-punk in the late 1970s and subsequently generated a thriving fanzine, label, and club and gig circuit. Compared to its counterpart, indie rock, the genre is more melodic, less abrasive, and relatively angst-free. In later years, the definition of indie pop has bifurcated to also mean bands from unrelated DIY scenes/movements with pop leanings. Subgenres include chamber pop and twee pop.

== Characteristics ==
Indie pop is defined by its DIY ethos, upbeat melodies, and an overarching sense of "authenticity." It primarily takes influences from post-punk, jangle pop, and its counterpart, indie rock. While sharing overarching similarities, indie pop is more melodic, simplistic, and accessible, eschewing the more abrasive and conventional aspects of indie rock. Music journalist Nitsuh Abebe noted in Pitchfork that:

Indie pop is not just "indie" that is "pop." Not too many people realize this, or really care either way. But you can be sure indie pop's fans know it. They have their own names for themselves ... the music they listen to ... their own canon of legendary bands ... and legendary labels ... their own pop stars ... their own zines ... websites ... mailing lists ... aesthetics ... festivals ... iconography ... fashion accessories ... and in-jokes ... in short, their own culture.

Music critic Simon Reynolds says that indie pop defines itself against "charting pop". Abebe explains:

One of those things was the idea that rock music was supposed to be cool – "cool" meaning sexy, tough, arty, fiery, or fantastical... The charts had "cool" covered – these kids, in their basements and bedrooms, were trying to hand-craft a mirror-image of it, a pop world where they were the stars... and a little bit of a raspberry blown at the larger musical world, which (sensibly) went right on preferring something more interesting than average white kids playing simple pop songs.

Indie pop was an unprecedented contrast from the gritty and serious tones of previous underground rock styles, as well as being a departure from the glamour of contemporary pop music. Distinguished from the angst and abrasiveness of its indie rock counterpart, the majority of indie pop borrows not only the stripped-down quality of punk, but also "the sweetness and catchiness of mainstream pop".

Indie pop and twee music scenes have often vocally rejected the sexist, homophobic, and racist attitudes of both mainstream and underground music scenes. However, while it has often been more inclusive than other forms of independent music in terms of gender and sexual orientation, its lack of racial diversity has been noted by critics.

== History ==
=== Forerunners ===
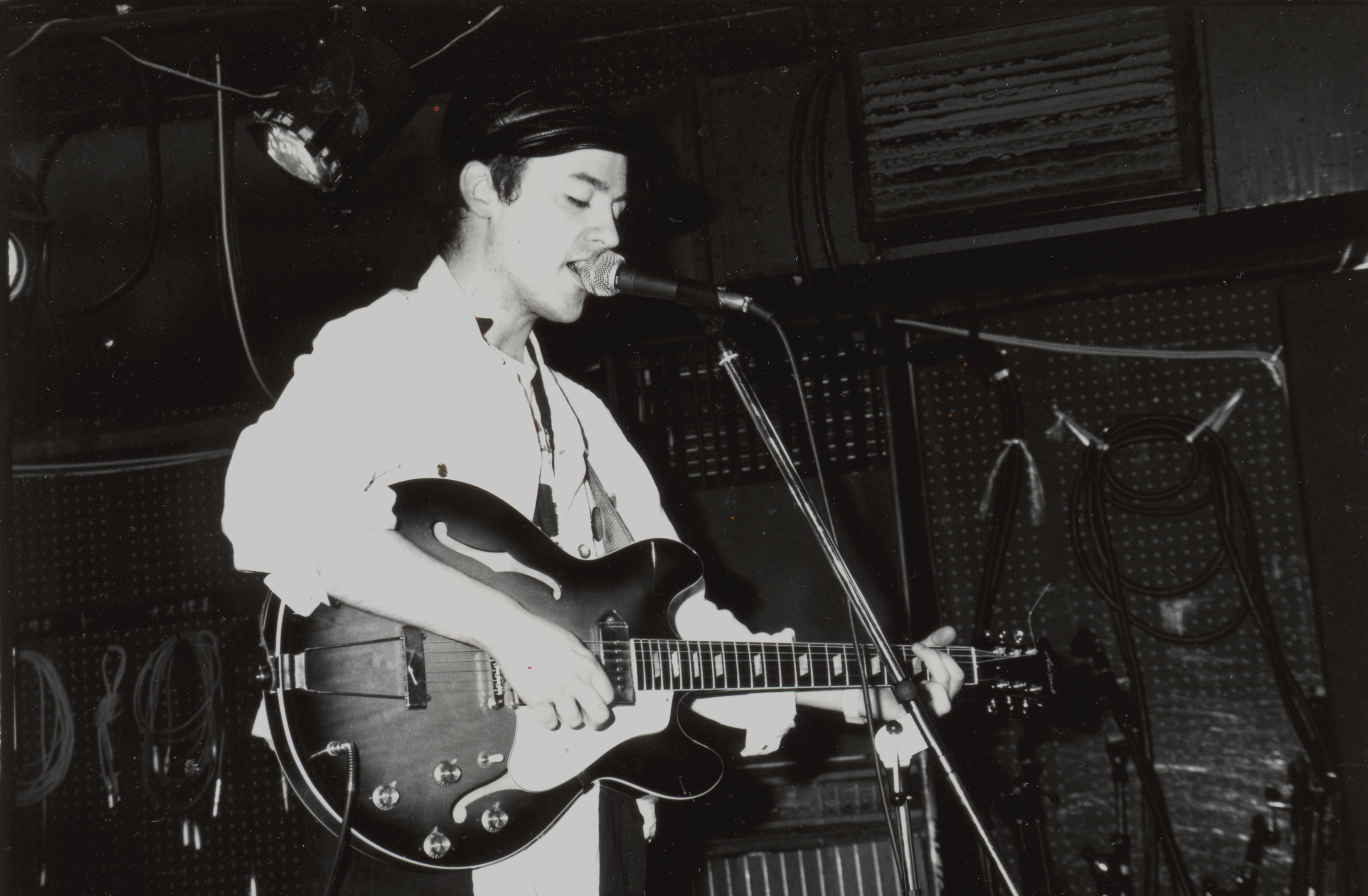
Dan Treacy's Television Personalities have been accredited as forerunners to indie pop.

According to Emily Dolan, indie pop is predicated on the music of the Velvet Underground, and "some of rock's more quirky and eccentric figures", such as Jonathan Richman. Abebe identifies the majority of indie as "all about that 60s-styled guitar jangle" as credited to bands like the Byrds. Other influences and precursors include the Beach Boys' Smiley Smile, Paul and Linda McCartney's Ram, as well as the power pop of the dB's and Alex Chilton's Big Star labeled the "power pop group to which all good indie melodicists pray".

Despite their relatively minor commercial success, the Television Personalities are highly regarded by critics and have been widely influential, especially on the C86 generation, while also inspiring Alan McGee to start Creation Records. Reynolds has said that "what we now know as indie music was invented in Scotland", with reference to the emergence of Postcard Records in 1979. Subsequently, Pitchfork cites Scottish post-punk bands such as Orange Juice, the Vaselines, and Josef K as influential to indie pop as well as female led post-punk bands the Raincoats, Marine Girls, Young Marble Giants and the Chefs. However, some have posited that the concept of indie music did not crystallize until the late 1980s and early 1990s.

Brisbane band the Go-Betweens were an early influential indie pop band, releasing their first single "Lee Remick" in 1978. Other influences include the Deep Freeze Mice and the Monochrome Set, the latter's early singles greatly influenced the indie pop band the Smiths, who went on to be one of the most important and commercially successful bands in the genre.

The Cure's early singles have been described as an influence on indie pop with their later song "Friday I'm in Love" being labeled by NME as a "bona fide indie pop masterpiece".

New Zealand's Dunedin sound was a key influence on indie music, with bands such as the Chills, the Clean, Tall Dwarfs, the Verlaines, the Bats and Straitjacket Fits setting the stage for indie pop music.

=== 1980s ===
Both indie and indie pop had originally referred to the same thing during the late 1970s, originally abbreviations for independent and popular. Inspired more by punk rock's DIY ethos than its style, guitar bands were formed on the then-novel premise that one could record and release their own music instead of having to procure a record contract from a major label.

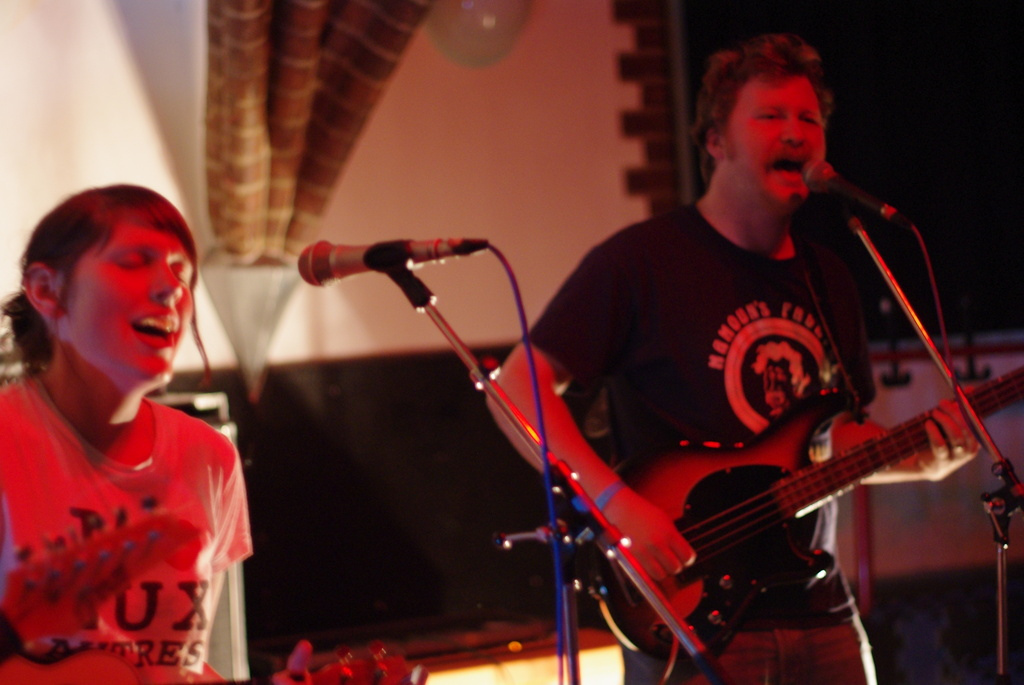
Indie pop band Allo Darlin' performing at Indie Pop Days (2010)

Manic Street Preachers bassist Nicky Wire remembers that it was the bands' very independence that gave the scene coherence:

"People were doing everything themselves—making their own records, doing the artwork, gluing the sleeves together, releasing them and sending them out, writing fanzines because the music press lost interest really quickly."

Names that indie pop fans use for themselves are popkids and popgeeks, and for the music they listen to, p!o!p, twee, anorak and C86.

Abebe says that the Scottish group the Pastels typified the "hip end of 'anorak': Their lazy melodies, lackadaisical strum, and naive attitude transformed the idea of the rock band into something casual, intimate, and free from the pretense of cool". Stephen Pastel's label 53rd & 3rd also put out other influential bands; such as the sole album from the initial-run of The Vaselines, which was famously appreciated by Kurt Cobain, as well as releases by Shop Assistants, Talulah Gosh and BMX Bandits.

Quinn Moreland, writing for Pitchfork, said the influence of English band Felt's 1986 album Forever Breathes the Lonely Word can be heard in later groups such as The Field Mice, and "from C86 all the way to Slumberland".

American indie pop band Beat Happening's 1985 eponymous debut album was influential in the development of the indie pop sound, particularly in North America.

=== C86 ===
Most of the modern notion of indie music stems from NME's 1986 compilation C86, which collects many guitar bands who were inspired by the early psychedelic sounds of 1960s garage rock. Pitchfork credits the C86 compilation as leaving a mark on "various waves of indie pop since the tape was first released in 1986".

Although many music critics such as Everett True, a former NME writer, argued that C86 was neither a label nor a defining factor behind indie pop—adding that "C86 didn't actually exist as a sound or style"—they still acknowledged that there wasn't much of an indie pop subculture before the tape's release, noting that prior to the compilation, the indie pop scene mostly amounted to "[...] boys like Bobby Gillespie and Edwyn Collins wearing their hair like members of The Byrds."

Bob Stanley (former Melody Maker journalist and founding member of the pop band Saint Etienne) acknowledges that participants at the time reacted against the lazy labelling, but insists they shared an approach:

"Of course the 'scene', like any scene, barely existed. Like squabbling Marxist factions, groups who had much in common built up petty rivalries. The June Brides and the Jasmine Minks were the biggest names at Alan McGee's Living Room Club and couldn't stand the sight of each other. Only when The Jesus and Mary Chain exploded and stole their two-headed crown did they realize they were basically soulmates".

Many of the actual C86 bands distanced themselves from the scene cultivated around them by the UK music press - in its time, C86 became a pejorative term for its associations with so-called "shambling" (a John Peel-coined description celebrating the self-conscious primitive approach of some of the music). The scene included bands like the Pastels, Talulah Gosh, the Bodines, the Shop Assistants and the Brilliant Corners, all of which were featured on either the original compilation or the expanded box set released in 2014.

=== 1990s ===
In the early 1990s, British indie pop influenced and branched off to a variety of styles. The US, which did not have as much of a scene in the 1980s, had many indie pop enthusiasts by the mid 1990s.

Following on from the aforementioned Postcard Records, in the UK, Bristol-based Sarah Records became the archetypal indie pop record label. They began releasing 7-inch singles in 1987 by bands with overt feminist and left wing principles that made "sweet pop". They released bands such as Heavenly, St. Christopher, the Field Mice, and Even As We Speak, before stopping in 1995.

In 1990, Rough Trade Records released the "indie pop classic" Reading, Writing and Arithmetic, the debut album by English band The Sundays.

Scotland's Belle and Sebastian began releasing albums in 1996, with their fandom initially spreading by word-of-mouth. They used a more lush instrumentation than the typical rock band format, with their songs including trumpets and violins, closer to what is called chamber pop.

In the US, Beat Happening's Calvin Johnson had founded K Records in Olympia, Washington, in 1982. During the 1990s the label released bands such as Lois, Tiger Trap, the Softies, All Girl Summer Fun Band, and Gaze. K and later labels like Slumberland (Velocity Girl, Rocketship, Henry's Dress, Black Tambourine) and Harriet (Tullycraft, the Magnetic Fields) encouraged the genre's spread across the country.

In Canada, in the mid-1990s, the band Cub was at the forefront of a subgenre of indie pop dubbed cuddlecore. Other Vancouver indie pop bands of the time include Gaze, and former Cub member Neko Case's later band Maow.

In Australia, Melbourne label Candle Records put out music by bands and musicians with wistful and humorous lyrics, like the Lucksmiths.

=== 2000s ===
Slumberland Records continued to release bands into the 2000s. By the end of the decade a scene of bands in New York emerged who explicitly claimed the label's releases as an influence. Slumberland went on to work with several of these including the Pains of Being Pure at Heart, Cause Co-Motion!, and Crystal Stilts. Fellow New Yorkers, Vivian Girls, were also often compared to C86, the Olympia music scene surrounding K Records, and Slumberland.

In Cardiff, Wales, Los Campesinos! formed in 2006 and The School formed in 2007. The School released albums on Spanish indie pop label Elefant Records.

=== 2010s ===
In the UK the record label Fortuna Pop! in London, though active since 1995, rose to prominence in the 2010s with indie pop bands like Allo Darlin', Evans the Death, the Spook School, and more indie-punk crossover bands like Joanna Gruesome, and Martha. The label had been sharing releases with Slumberland since co-releasing the Aislers Set's The Last Match in 2000, and after that many bands signed initially to just one of the labels had albums released by Fortuna Pop in the UK and Slumberland in the U.S. This was ended by Fortuna Pop's eventual closure in 2016.

In 2010, London based band Veronica Falls released two singles on the American label Captured Tracks. They went on to release two albums, Veronica Falls (2011) and Waiting For Something to Happen (2013), on Bella Union in the UK / EU and Slumberland in the US.

Glasgow based band Sacred Paws began releasing music in 2015, formed by Ray Aggs and Eilidh Rogers who initially met when their old bands Trash Kit and Golden Grrrls played a show together.

=== 2020s ===
Slumberland Records are still a going concern having celebrated their 35th year in early 2025. A concert to celebrate the milestone included recent signings Jeanines and Lightheaded, as well as older act Lorelei.

== Related genres ==
=== Twee pop ===
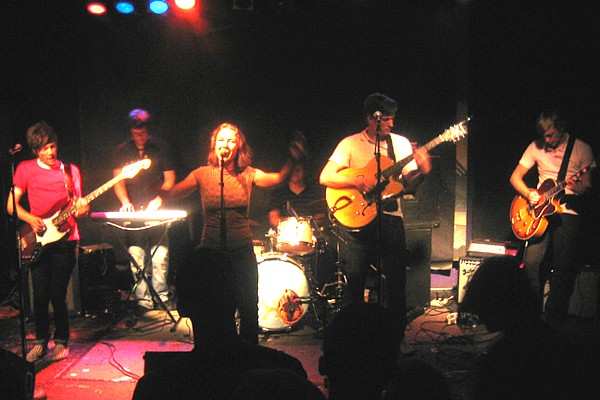
Acid House Kings, a twee pop band

Twee pop is a subgenre of indie pop that originates from C86. Characterised by its simplicity and perceived innocence, some of its defining features are boy-girl harmonies, catchy melodies, and lyrics about love. For many years, most bands were distributed by Sarah Records (in the UK) and K Records (in the US).

=== Shibuya-kei ===
Shibuya-kei is a Japanese style from the 1990s that was embraced by indie pop enthusiasts, partly because many of its bands were distributed in the United States through major indie labels like Matador and Grand Royal. Out of all the Japanese groups from the scene, Pizzicato Five was the closest to achieving mainstream success in the US.

=== Chamber pop ===
Chamber pop is a subgenre of indie pop that features lush orchestrations. Heavily influenced by Brian Wilson and Burt Bacharach, the majority of Louis Phillipe's productions for él Records embodied the sophisticated use of orchestras and voices that typified the style, whilst the Divine Comedy were the most popular chamber pop act of the Britpop era.

== See also ==
- List of indie pop artists
