= Jasper Leach discography =

Jasper Patrick Leach has released music as the frontman of Burner Herzog, Brasil, and The Myonics, and has contributed to numerous releases by other artists as a producer, engineer, and instrumentalist.

== Discography ==
=== Studio albums ===
Year	Title	Artist	Label	Format	Role
2012	Pagans	The Myonics	Mt. Kagorama (MYNX-001)	LP, digital	Vocals, producer
2013	Brasil	Brasil	Self-released	LP, digital	Lead vocals, guitar, Casiotone
2016	At Paradise Park	Brasil	Death Records (cassette); self-released (digital)	Cassette, digital	Lead vocals, guitar, piano, monotron
2020	Big Love	Burner Herzog	Paisley Shirt Records (PSR-32)	Cassette, CD, digital	Songwriter, lead vocals, lap steel, marimba; mixer ("Lucky Star")
2023	Random Person	Burner Herzog	Take-A-Turn Records	LP, digital	Songwriter, lead vocals, guitar, additional keyboards

=== EPs ===
Year	Title	Artist	Label	Format	Role
2010	Digits	The Myonics	Self-released	Digital, cassette	Producer; guitar, bass, synth, vocals
2012	White Light/White Heat	Jasper Patrick Leach	Self-released	Cassette (limited 42), digital	Performer, producer, mixer (track-for-track cover album of The Velvet Underground's White Light/White Heat)
2017	Wonderful American	Burner Herzog	Death Records	Cassette, digital	Songwriter, multi-instrumentalist; co-producer (with Paul Korte)

=== Singles ===
Year	Title	Artist	Label	Role
2016	"Dark Places"	Burner Herzog	Self-released	Songwriter, multi-instrumentalist (debut single)

=== Production and engineering credits ===
Year	Artist	Title	Label	Role
2017	Preening	Plaza Demo	Self-released	Recording engineer
2017	Animal I	Blank Square	Castle Face Records	Producer, engineer
2018	Marinero	High Tone	Big Crazy	Recording, mixing, mastering
2018	Tony Molina	Kill the Lights	Slumberland Records	Recording engineer; drums and tambourine on "Jasper's Theme" (named for him)
2018	New Circle	Memento	Smoking Room (SR-025)	Recording, mixing, mastering
2020	R.E. Seraphin	Tiny Shapes	Paisley Shirt Records / Mt.St.Mtn.	Recording engineer, mixer, co-producer; electric guitars, keys, percussion, backing vocals
2020	Toner	Silk Road	Smoking Room (SR-040)	Mixed and mastered (at Alcatraz Manor, Berkeley)
2022	Tony Molina	In the Fade	Run for Cover Records	Co-produced with Molina
2023	Ted Nash & Kristen Lee Sergeant	Holidays	Sunnyside (SSC-1731)	Assistant engineer
2024	Yea-Ming & The Rumours	I Can't Have It All	Dandy Boy Records (DBR-040)	Mixer; percussion; organ on "Pretending"; vocals on "Alice Sings"
2025	Chris Portka	The Album Everyone Wants	CGT Records & Software	Co-producer, engineer, mixer; bass, piano, organ, guitar, backing vocals

=== Musician credits ===
Year	Artist	Title	Label	Role
2011	The Symbolick Jews	Slave to Love	Self-released	Guitar, bass, vocals, accordion
2012	The Symbolick Jews	"Pretty Girl" (single)	Self-released	Bass, guitar
2013	Glass Cake	Lunar Caustic (EP)	Self-released	Bass
2017	Qualia	Aside	Self-released	Bass on "the way we never were"; harmony vocals (Qualia Choir)
2019	Tony Molina	Songs from San Mateo County	Smoking Room Records	Bass, acoustic and 12-string guitar, tambourine and organ on "Word Around Town"
2020	Bill Baird	Flower Children's Children's Children	Self-released	Lead guitar; co-writer ("Limp Limo")
2021	Bill Baird	Dead Man	Self-released	Guitar
2022	Bill Baird	∞ Infinite Eye ∞	Self-released	Lead guitar ("Slump City"); slide guitar ("Mad Mother")
2022	The Lost Days	In The Store	Speakeasy Studios	Piano, hammond organ
2022	Tony Molina	In the Fade	Run for Cover Records	Guitar, bass, piano, mellotron, Hammond organ, tambourine, backing vocals

=== Other contributions ===
Leach served as musical director for the 2011 reunion of Cold Sun at Austin Psych Fest, the band's only public performance in over four decades. He has also performed live with the Tony Molina Band, Smiles, Bill Baird, Primal Wound, and Glass Cake, and has produced material by Pamela and HLYR.
