= Zücker =

Studio album by Fastbacks
- Released: 1993
- Genres: Pop-punk, alternative rock
- Length: 33:02
- Label: Sub Pop

Fastbacks chronology
Very, Very Powerful Motor (1990)	Zücker (1993)	Answer the Phone, Dummy (1994)

Zücker is the third studio album by the Fastbacks, released in 1993 on Sub Pop. Pitchfork wrote that it "was as close as they came to an alt-rock breakout."

The twelfth track, "Please Read Me", is a cover of a Bee Gees song from the 1967 album Bee Gees 1st.

== Critical reception ==
Professional ratings
Review scores
Source	Rating
AllMusic	4.5/5 stars
Robert Christgau	(neither)
Select	3/5 medals
Spin Alternative Record Guide	7/10

Trouser Press wrote that "while Bloch works overtime on his fretwork, Warnick and Gargiulo singly and collectively manage the best-ever Fastbacks singing — none of which alters the group’s underlying lack of gravity." The Chicago Tribune called the album "wall-to-wall punk-pop, enough to restore one's faith in the potency of a good tune played fast and hard."

== Track listing ==
All songs written by Kurt Bloch, except where noted.

1. "Believe Me Never" – 3:03
2. "Gone to the Moon" – 1:50
3. "Hung on a Bad Peg" – 1:46
4. "Under the Old Lightbulb" – 1:35
5. "Never Heard of Him" – 1:47
6. "When I'm Old" – 3:37
7. "All About Nothing" – 2:27
8. "Bill Challenger" – 1:17
9. "Parts" – 1:46
10. "Kind of Game" – 2:35
11. "They Don't Care" – 2:32
12. "Please Read Me" (Barry Gibb, Robin Gibb) (Bee Gees cover)– 2:06
13. "Save Room for Me" – 3:13
14. "That Was" – 3:08

== Personnel ==
- Kim Warnick – Vocals, bass
- Kurt Bloch – Guitar
- Lulu Gargiulo – Guitar
- Rusty Willoughby – Drums
