= In the Store =

Studio album by the Lost Days
- Released: 17 March 2023
- Studios: Nick Bassett's home studio, Oakland
- Genres: Indie folk; jangle pop; lo-fi
- Label: Speakeasy Studios SF

The Lost Days chronology
Lost Demos (EP) (2021)	In the Store (2023)

In the Store is the debut studio album by American indie folk duo the Lost Days, the project of Tony Molina and Sarah Rose Janko of Dawn Riding.

== Background and recording ==
The Lost Days formed in 2021 after Tony Molina and Sarah Rose Janko met at a memorial service for a mutual friend. The pair began playing guitar and singing together at Janko's warehouse apartment in East Oakland. They released the five-song EP, Lost Demos, on cassette in April 2021 through the Oakland label The Long Road Society.

Janko subsequently moved to New Orleans, and the COVID-19 pandemic limited in-person collaboration. Molina wrote a second batch of songs with Janko's voice in mind and sent demos to her remotely.

The duo recorded In the Store on eight-track tape at musician Nick Bassett's home studio in Oakland. Bassett contributed drums and keyboards. Jasper Leach played piano and Hammond organ on the title track. In an interview with the music blog Since I Left You, Molina described the album as a thematic exploration of alcoholism, the self-involvement it produces, and ultimate recovery from it.

== Music and lyrics ==
In the Store consists of 10 short songs in a lo-fi folk-pop style, recorded to analog tape. Only one song crosses the two-minute mark. Reviewers described the album as nocturnal and hushed, with whispered vocals—particularly from Janko—and muted full-band arrangements. Critics identified the influence of the Byrds, Bill Fox, Dear Nora, and Guided by Voices.

Lyrically, the album addresses alcoholism, depression, and complex personal relationships. In an interview with Since I Left You, Molina said that:

The whole album is about alcoholism and from the perspective of someone who sees the world through an alcoholic lens. The thing about alcoholics is that we have a lot in common and share similar stories and experiences...As a person in recovery, I felt like I needed to document these things at the time when I was going through it.

Molina has been sober since August of 2022. In an interview with Yellow Green Red, he credits his sobriety, and quitting social media, with giving him newfound clarity and perspective.

== Release and reception ==
Speakeasy Studios SF, the San Francisco independent label run by Molina's wife, Alicia Vanden Heuvel of the Aislers Set, released In the Store on 17 March 2023. The title track and "For Today" were released as advance singles in February 2023. The music videos for "In the Store," "Gonna Have to Tell You," and "For Today" were directed by Vanden Heuvel.

The album received favorable reviews from independent music outlets. Writing for Ticketmaster's Discover, Mark Grassick called the album "a brief but beautiful album of nocturnal indie folk" and described its hushed arrangements as "late-night music". Jennifer Kelly of Dusted praised the songwriting and identified the production as following in the DIY home-recording tradition of Guided by Voices' early-1990s cassette work. Christopher Anthony Brown of The Fire Note highlighted the album's emotional weight and concision.

== Track listing ==
All songs written by Tony Molina.

In the Store track listing
No.	Title	Length
1.	"Gonna Have to Tell You"	1:51
2.	"In the Store"	1:02
3.	"For Today"	1:06
4.	"Long Before You Know"	1:20
5.	"Wherever You Go"	1:00
6.	"Be Around"	1:04
7.	"Out the Door"	1:13
8.	"So Much Pain"	1:00
9.	"Wrong Tonight"	2:27
10.	"Goodbye, So Long"	1:25
Total length:		13:33

== Personnel ==
Adapted from the album's Bandcamp credits.

- Tony Molina – vocals, guitar, songwriting
- Sarah Rose Janko – vocals
- Nick Bassett – drums, keyboards
- Jasper Leach – piano, Hammond organ (on "In the Store")
