= Very, Very Powerful Motor =

Studio album by Fastbacks
- Released: 1990
- Genres: Punk rock, indie rock
- Length: 33:02
- Label: PopLlama

Fastbacks chronology
And His Orchestra (1987)	Very, Very Powerful Motor (1990)	Zücker (1993)

Very, Very Powerful Motor is the second studio album by the Fastbacks, released in 1990 on PopLlama Records.

The second track, "Apologies," is a cover of a Pointed Sticks song.

== Critical reception ==
Professional ratings
Review scores
Source	Rating
AllMusic	4.5/5 stars
Spin Alternative Record Guide	8/10

Trouser Press wrote that the album "gives Bloch’s pop-rooted songs rocking arrangements that occasionally overwhelm them." Greil Marcus, in Artforum, called it "unreconstructed punk with a lot of melody, no apologies ... and Kim Warnick, for whom singing flat is just a form a realism."

== Track listing ==
All songs written by Kurt Bloch, except where noted.

1. "In the Summer" – 3:23
2. "Apologies" (Nick Jones) – 1:50
3. "Trouble Sleeping" – 3:18
4. "Better Than Before" – 3:25
5. "What to Expect/Dirk's Car Jam" – 5:02
6. "Says Who?" – 4:12
7. "Last Night I Had a Dream That I Could Fly" – 5:13
8. "I Won't Regret" – 3:25
9. "I Guess" – 2:41
10. "Always Tomorrow" – 4:25
11. "I'll Be Okay" – 5:00
12. "Everything I Don't Need" – 3:22

== Personnel ==
- Kim Warnick – vocals, bass
- Kurt Bloch – guitar
- Lulu Gargiulo – guitar
- Nate Johnson – drums
