= Ovens (band) =

American power pop band from the San Francisco Bay Area

- Origin: Millbrae, California, U.S.
- Genres: Power pop, lo-fi, indie rock, hardcore punk
- Years active: 2003–2009
- Labels: tUMULt; Catholic Guilt Records; Melters; Tankcrimes
- Past members: Tony Molina

Ovens was an American hardcore and power pop band from Millbrae, California, active from approximately 2003 to 2009. The band was founded by vocalist and guitarist Tony Molina, who went on to a solo career on Slumberland, Matador, and Run for Cover Records. Ovens recorded prolifically during the mid-2000s, producing enough material for what producer Andee Connors described as "five full-length albums," the bulk of which was compiled on a 44-track self-titled CD released in 2009. The album was reissued on vinyl for the first time by Tankcrimes in December 2022.

Scott Russell of Paste wrote: "To best appreciate Bay Area guitar-pop wizard Tony Molina, one must first appreciate Ovens, the unsung band in which he laid the foundations for his solo sound."

== History ==
Molina formed Ovens in the Bay Area around 2003, after briefly operating under the name The Peels, which was changed following a naming conflict with a band from Seattle. The band recorded extensively throughout the mid-2000s across a series of sessions, working in a style that blended power pop melody, influenced by Weezer, Teenage Fanclub, and Guided by Voices, with the concise, aggressive structures of the Bay Area hardcore punk scene in which Molina had come up.

In 2009, tUMULt Records—run by Andee Connors of the San Francisco record shop Aquarius Records—compiled the band's recordings into a 44-track self-titled CD. Connors wrote of the release: "These guys accomplish more in 30 seconds than most pop bands can pull off over the course of a full album. And they accomplish more in these 44 songs than most bands manage in their whole careers."

A 7-inch of eight songs from the band's 2008 recording sessions was released by Catholic Guilt Records in 2011. In 2014, Melters Records, the label that had released Molina's solo debut Dissed and Dismissed the previous year, issued a 4-track 7-inch of songs recorded in 2005 by Kurt Bloch of The Fastbacks and mastered by Paul Oldham.

Molina disbanded Ovens around 2009. A reworking of the Ovens song "Song for Friends," titled "Song for Friends (Slight Return)," appeared on his solo album In the Fade (2022).

== 2022 reissue ==
In October 2022, Tankcrimes announced a vinyl reissue of the 2009 CD as a double LP pressed at 45 RPM, with the album made available on streaming platforms for the first time simultaneously. The pressing comprised 200 copies on black vinyl and 1,800 on white vinyl (catalog TC131). The reissue received coverage at Stereogum, Paste, Treble, and The Fire Note, among other outlets.

The Fire Note described the compilation as capturing "44 tracks in one glorious hour of listening," adding that "OVENS captures so much of what has made Tony Molina one of the great underground artists of his generation."

== Discography ==
Title	Year	Format	Label	Notes
Ovens	2009	CD (44 tracks)	tUMULt	Compiled from mid-2000s sessions; first release of the recordings
Ovens 7"	2011	7" vinyl (8 tracks)	Catholic Guilt Records	Songs from 2008 recording sessions
7"	2014	7" vinyl (4 tracks)	Melters (MELT004)	Recorded in 2005 by Kurt Bloch; mastered by Paul Oldham
Ovens	2022	2×LP, 45 RPM (Tankcrimes TC131)	Tankcrimes	First vinyl pressing of the 2009 CD; first time on streaming platforms; 200 black / 1,800 white vinyl
