= Aquarius Records =

Aquarius Records may refer to:

- Aquarius Records (store), a record store in San Francisco, California
- Aquarius Records (Canada), a Canadian independent record label
- Aquarius Records (Croatia), a Croatian record label
- Aquarius Records (Paris), a French record label distributed by President Records
- Aquarius Records, a Jamaican record store and record label operated by Herman Chin Loy
