= Flop (band) =

American rock band (1990–1995)

- Flop in 1993

Background information
- Origin: Seattle, Washington
- Genres: Pop punk; power pop; punk rock
- Years active: 1990–1995
- Labels: Lucky; Dashboard Hula Girl; Frontier; Sony 550; Munster; Super Electro
- Past members: Rusty Willoughby; Bill Campbell; Paul Schurr (1990–1994); Dave Fox (1994–1995); Nate Johnson

Flop was an American rock band from Seattle. The band formed in 1990, released recordings on the Frontier and Sony 550 record labels, and made a brief appearance in Doug Pray's motion picture documentary Hype!.

== History ==
=== The Beginning (1990–1991) ===
Flop's original four members consisted of lead singer, guitarist and songwriter Rusty Willoughby, guitarist Bill Campbell, bassist Paul Schurr, and drummer Nate Johnson. Willoughby, Campbell and Schurr lived together with a few other friends in a large Craftsman-style house in Seattle's U-District near the University of Washington campus.

Willoughby, Campbell and Schurr began jamming together during the declines of their respective bands Pure Joy, Chemistry Set and Seers of Bavaria. Johnson, drummer for seminal Seattle punk band The Fastbacks, frequented many of the parties at the U-District house and eventually joined them, completing the foursome. Never intending to actually become a real band, they toyed with many self-deprecating names including "Butt Sweat and Tears" and "The Value Village People". Eventually however they lied their way into a show and needed an official name and inspired by the headline for a review of a local play in the newspaper "Resounding Flop" was shortened to "Flop" and a band was born.

The band's first live performance was opening for Game Theory at the University of Washington's Husky Union Building ballroom. The promoters originally booked Willoughby's band Pure Joy for the show but Flop played instead, thus notifying his former bandmates of Pure Joy's demise. Pure Joy was still listed as the supporting act on fliers and advertisements.

Flop's live performances over its first two years were marked with near fall-down drunkenness, numerous pitchers of beer poured on band members and audiences alike, and many broken instruments (both theirs and others). Flop was banned from two clubs, one in Vancouver and one in Bellingham during this period.

The band's debut record, The Losing End, was released in 1990 as a 45-RPM 7-inch EP, and contained four tracks of Flop's earliest material: "The Losing End", "Somehow", "Dissipate" and "Fucking Thing" (shortened to "Ucking" on the sleeve and "F* Thing" on the vinyl artwork at the demand of the record-pressing plant's religious owners). The record was released on the Lucky Records recording label, with cover art provided by Willoughby's brother Randy Willoughby.

Shortly after The Losing End, Flop released its first single, Drugs, featuring a cover version of "Action" by Sweet. Willoughby has openly expressed disapproval of the record, along with apologies to the record label Dashboard Hula Girl Records, citing unsatisfactory editing and the poor quality of the songs themselves. The sleeve art contains two photos of cadavers in mid-autopsy, taken from one of Schurr's pre-med manuals.

Following the release of Drugs, Johnson left on an Alaska vacation (i.e., gutting fish in a fish-canning boat), putting the band on a year-long hiatus. After Johnson's return to Seattle, the band came back to the studio to record their 1992 debut album, Flop and the Fall of the Mopsqueezer!.

=== Flop and the Fall of the Mopsqueezer! (1992–1993) ===
Flop and the Fall of the Mopsqueezer! was recorded primarily at Egg Studios in Seattle by Kurt Bloch, and was released by Lisa Fancher's Frontier Records (the vinyl version of the album released on Dashboard Hula Girl Records). Four of the album's sixteen tracks, "I Told A Lie", "Anne," "Tomato Paste" and "Hello," would later be included on the band's Munster Records 7-inch EP, We Are You.

According to Rusty Willoughby, the album's basic tracks were recorded hours after a Flop performance in Vancouver, and it was Johnson's return to Seattle from Alaska that "energized" the band into creating the record.

=== Whenever You're Ready (1993–1994) ===
Flop and the Fall of the Mopsqueezer! drew the attention of young A&R man Stuart Meyer at Epic Records, who offered the band a recording contract (Stuart later attributed his subsequent move to Seattle and current work at Sub Pop Records to the personal and business relationships he made while wooing Flop to Epic). The band was signed to Epic during the height of "alternative music" and Seattle-band popularity. Flop recorded its first, and only, major label release, Whenever You're Ready, with The Fastbacks' Kurt Bloch. The record was then mixed by Martin Rushent (renowned for his work with artists like Buzzcocks and Human League), and was released in 1993 on Sony 550, an imprint label of Epic Records headed by now music mogul Polly Anthony. It was "crammed with wonky lyrics, self-consciously clever song structures, and earnest vocals".

The band, as did many independent bands signed to major labels at the time, found their ideals and work ethic at odds with the corporate Epic engine, and as a result the record quickly became a low priority for the label's marketing and promotion departments. The record was not commercially successful and the band was dropped by the label.

Following several national and regional club tours, some headlining, others supporting acts like The Lemonheads and The Screaming Trees, Schurr left the band. He was replaced by former Posies bassist Dave Fox following Flop's month-long European tour with The Posies.

=== World of Today (1995) ===
Having already recorded another album's worth of music, Flop returned to Frontier Records to release its third and final LP, World of Today, a selection of songs with themes ranging from the death of Kurt Cobain to life stories of arsonists. Shortly after its release, Johnson, arguably the heart of the band, left for Europe. Flop disbanded shortly thereafter, playing its final show at The Casbah in San Diego.

=== Reunion Show (2012) ===
On August 18, 2012, Flop reunited to play at Whiting Tennis' "Annual Country Mouse / City Mouse House Party" in a north Seattle neighborhood. The band played 18 songs, 14 with original bassist Paul Schurr and 4 with "World of Today" bassist Dave Fox. The reunion took place when Nate traveled from Budapest to the US to attend his parents' 50th Wedding Anniversary. Nate had not played drums in six years; Paul and Bill had not played in over ten years. Edwin Fotheringham designed a poster for the reunion which was screen printed and sold to the 100 (or so) family, friends, and fans in attendance, with proceeds going to the Music for Marriage Equality organization.

== Critical reception ==
Flop has been referred to as a band with "dangerous tendencies toward dubious ostentation," "dry-witted, intelligent pop" and "too idiosyncratic to be lumped in with what most people think of as 'the Seattle sound'".

== Style and influences ==
=== Musical style ===
The music performed by Flop was described by Michael Sutton of AllMusic as "pure power pop" and "recalling the punk-fueled energy of The Jam and Buzzcocks".

=== Influences ===
The band has noted a wide range of influences, including Buzzcocks, Patsy Cline, David Bowie and the Beatles.

== Discography ==
=== Albums ===
- Flop and the Fall of the Mopsqueezer! (Frontier Records - 1992)
- Whenever You're Ready (Sony 550 - 1993)
- World of Today (Frontier Records - 1995)

=== EPs and singles ===
- The Losing End (Lucky Records - 1990)
- Drugs (Dashboard Hula Girl Records - 1990)
- Anne (1993)
- We Are You (Munster Records - 1993)
- Regrets (Sony 550 - 1993)
- The Great Valediction (Sony 550 - 1993)
- Act 1 Scene 1 (Super Electro - 1995)
- Place I Love (1995)

=== Compilation albums ===
- Another Damned Seattle Compilation (Dashboard Hula Girl Records - 1990)
- American Pie 2 (Rubber Records - 1996)
- Hype! soundtrack (Sub Pop - 1996)
