= On This Day (album) =

Studio album by Tony Molina
- Released: November 14, 2025
- Recorded: 2023–2025
- Studios: Home studio, San Francisco; Atomic Garden, Oakland (Hammond organ and piano)
- Genres: Folk pop, power pop, baroque pop, lo-fi
- Length: 22:31
- Label: Slumberland Records / Olde Fade / Speakeasy Studios SF
- Producers: Tony Molina, Alicia Vanden Heuvel

Tony Molina chronology
In the Fade (2022)	On This Day (2025)

On This Day is an album by Bay Area musician Tony Molina, released on November 14, 2025, as a three-way co-release between Slumberland Records, Olde Fade (Molina's own imprint), and Speakeasy Studios SF. It contains 21 songs with a total runtime of 22 minutes and 31 seconds, recorded to half-inch 8-track analog tape at Molina and Alicia Vanden Heuvel's home studio in San Francisco, with additional recording at Atomic Garden in Oakland.

The album was issued on black vinyl LP, compact disc, and digital download. A limited edition pressing included a bonus 7" flexi containing two additional covers: Kaleidoscope's "Dear Nellie Goodrich" and Nico's "Somewhere There's a Feather."

== Background ==
The album was co-produced by Molina and his wife, Alicia Vanden Heuvel of the Aislers Set, who also contributed piano, Hammond organ, Mellotron, vocals, and drums on several tracks. Jack Shirley, a longtime Molina collaborator, engineered the Hammond organ and piano sessions at Atomic Garden in Oakland. Nick Bassett mixed the album.

The album was announced on September 23, 2025, alongside three advance tracks: "FC '23", "Faded Holiday", and a cover of Eric Andersen's "Violets of Dawn". A fourth advance single, "Have Your Way", was released on October 14, 2025. To coincide with the release, Molina undertook a brief East Coast tour supported by Jeanines and Lightheaded, playing dates in Washington D.C., Richmond, Philadelphia, and New York.

== Critical reception ==
Professional ratings
Review scores
Source	Rating
The Big Takeover	Positive
The Fire Note	Positive
Post-Trash	Positive
Scene Point Blank	7.9/10
The Vinyl District	Positive

On This Day received positive reviews from independent music publications. The Big Takeover described it as "an apex of his refined craft" and called Molina "a unique, essential voice in contemporary guitar-driven pop." Post-Trash called him "a standard bearer of analog jangle pop" and likened his melodic instincts to those of Brian Wilson. Scene Point Blank awarded the album 7.9 out of 10, noting Molina's evolution toward folk-rock while calling him "the same old pessimistic guitar virtuoso." The Vinyl District described it as "a gem... blending folk-pop, chime-pop, and baroque-pop."

== Track listing ==
No.	Title	Length
1.	"On This Day '24"	0:15
2.	"FC '23"	1:27
3.	"Faded Holiday"	0:50
4.	"Lie to Kick It"	0:51
5.	"Despise the Sun"	1:01
6.	"No Place to Turn"	1:03
7.	"Have Your Way"	0:58
8.	"Take Some Time"	0:56
9.	"Broken Down"	1:00
10.	"Just as the Tide Was Flowing" (traditional; popularized by Shirley Collins)	1:20
11.	"Ovens Theme Pt. 5"	0:46
12.	"Livin' Wrong"	1:45
13.	"Been Wronged"	0:40
14.	"Transplant Blues"	1:07
15.	"Ghosts of Punishment Past"	0:58
16.	"Out from the Dark"	0:45
17.	"Don't Belong"	1:06
18.	"Inside Your Mind Pt. 2"	1:14
19.	"Violets of Dawn" (Eric Andersen cover)	2:15
20.	"Ovens Theme Pt. 6"	0:29
21.	"Meet the Author"	1:45
Total length:		22:31

== Personnel ==
- Tony Molina – vocals, guitars, production
- Alicia Vanden Heuvel – piano, Hammond organ, Mellotron, vocals, bells, shaker, drums (tracks 7, 9), guitar (track 5), production
- Steve Kerwin – drums (tracks 2, 12, 15, 17, 19)
- Stephen Oriolo – guitar (tracks 12, 15, 19)
- Rachel Orimo – vocals (tracks 2, 4, 9, 10, 12, 19)
- Gary Olson (The Ladybug Transistor) – trumpet
- Jack Shirley – engineering (Atomic Garden, Oakland)
- Nick Bassett – mixing
- Chloe Ginnever – cover photography
