= Rusty Willoughby =

American musician (born 1966)

- Born: 30 June 1966 (age 60); Staten Island, New York, U.S.
- Origin: Vashon Island, Washington, United States
- Genre: Rock
- Instruments: Guitar, Drums, Singing
- Formerly of: Flop, Pure Joy, Cobirds Unite, Llama
- Website: https://rustywilloughby.bandcamp.com/

Rusty Willoughby (born June 30, 1966) is an American musician born in Staten Island and currently living in Vashon, Washington, a suburb of Seattle. As of 2011, he has been vocalist, songwriter and guitarist or bass guitarist for several Seattle based bands: Pure Joy (1984–1989, 1997–2004), Flop (1990–1995), Llama (2005–2008), and Cobirds Unite (2010–). He also briefly played drums for the Fastbacks. He also played with Kurt Bloch of the Fastbacks, Jonathan Poneman (co-founder of the record label Sub Pop), and Scott Sutherland (of Seattle bands Model Rockets and Chemistry Set) in a Cheap Trick cover band called Sick Man of Europe, and appeared in the film Hype!, a documentary directed about the popularity of grunge rock.

== Musical style ==
In a 1999 review of Willoughby's self-titled solo album, Don Yates of KEXP-FM described his "Beatlesque songcraft" as "bring[ing] to mind the starker side of Elliott Smith."

== Discography ==
=== Solo albums ===
- Rusty Willoughby self-released, 1999)
- Filament Dust (self-released, 2009)
- Cobirds Unite (self-released, 2010)
- Adult Soft Record (self-release, 2012)
- Anti (self-released, 2013)

=== Solo singles ===
- "Here Come the Weakened" / "And the World Moves On" (Sub Pop, 1999, 7-inch vinyl)

=== Flop albums ===
- Flop and the Fall of the Mopsqueezer! (Frontier Records - 1992)
- Whenever You're Ready (Sony 550 - 1993)
- World of Today (Frontier Records - 1995)

=== Flop EPs and Singles ===
- The Losing End (Lucky Records - 1990)
- Drugs (Dashboard Hula Girl Records - 1990)
- Anne (1993)
- We Are You (Munster Records - 1993)
- Regrets (Sony 550 - 1993)
- The Great Valediction (Sony 550 - 1993)
- Act 1 Scene 1 (Super Electro - 1995)
- Place I Love (1995)

=== Pure Joy albums and EPs ===
- Pure Joy (Dwindle Music, 1986, EP)
- Carnivore (PopLlama, 1989)
- Sore Throte, Ded Goat (No Threes, 1989 or 1990, EP)
- Unsung (Flydaddy, recorded 1987, released 1994)
- Getz the Worm (Flydaddy, 1997)
- Gelatin and Bright (Book Records, 2003)
