= In the Fade (Tony Molina album) =

Studio album by Tony Molina
- Released: August 12, 2022
- Recorded: 2020–2021
- Studios: Atomic Garden (East Palo Alto, CA); House of Faith (Oakland, CA)
- Genres: Power pop, indie rock, folk pop
- Length: 18:00
- Label: Summer Shade / Run for Cover Records
- Producers: Tony Molina, Jasper Leach

Tony Molina chronology
Songs from San Mateo County (2019)	In the Fade (2022)	On This Day (2025)

In the Fade is an album by Bay Area musician Tony Molina, released on August 12, 2022, on Summer Shade, an imprint of Run for Cover Records. It is his fifth solo album and his first release on a label other than Slumberland Records since his early career. Produced by Molina and Jasper Leach, the album was recorded at Atomic Garden in East Palo Alto and House of Faith in Oakland, with engineering by Jack Shirley and Bart Thurber respectively. Vocalist Sarah Rose Janko, Molina's collaborator in The Lost Days, contributed guest vocals.

The album features "Song for Friends (Slight Return)," a reworking of a song originally recorded by Molina's former band Ovens in 2008, and closes with a cover of "Fluff," an instrumental by Tony Iommi from Black Sabbath's Vol. 4 (1972).

== Background ==
Molina recorded In the Fade during 2020 and 2021, a period of reduced live performance due to the COVID-19 pandemic. The album was announced in June 2022 alongside the single "The Last Time," which premiered at Stereogum. Two further singles, "I Don't Like That He" and "Not Worth Knowing," were released a few weeks before the album.

The album's initial vinyl pressing was limited to 250 copies on black vinyl, followed by subsequent colour variants.

== Critical reception ==
Professional ratings
Review scores
Source	Rating
AllMusic	4.5/5 stars
Bandcamp Daily	Album of the Day
The Needle Drop	80/100
Paste	80/100
Treble	Positive

In the Fade received broadly positive reviews. Bandcamp Daily named it Album of the Day, describing it as "the cleanest, clearest distillation of an aesthetic the 36-year-old has continued to explore since forming his first band, Ovens, in San Francisco in the early 2000s." AllMusic awarded it 4.5 out of 5 stars. Scott Russell of Paste awarded it 80 out of 100, writing that the album "is Molina's entire truth, and he knows that if you've come this far with him, or are this late to the party, you'll want to hear it all." Jeff Terich of Treble called it "his most ambitious album to date as well as his strongest set of songs." Anthony Fantano of the Needle Drop gave the album a score of 8 out of 10, remarking: "At 18 minutes, this is basically Tony's Lawrence of Arabia."

== Track listing ==
No.	Title	Length
1.	"Aye Aye My My (Into the Fade)"	0:34
2.	"The Last Time"	1:24
3.	"Not Worth Knowing"	1:55
4.	"Leave This Town"	1:50
5.	"Don't Be Far"	1:05
6.	"Song for Friends (Slight Return)" (originally recorded by Ovens (2008))	1:02
7.	"Ovens Theme pt. 4"	0:32
8.	"Fuck Off Now"	0:59
9.	"I Don't Like That He"	1:28
10.	"All I've Known"	1:23
11.	"Burn Everyone"	1:36
12.	"Four Sided Cell"	1:31
13.	"Years Ago pt. 2"	1:32
14.	"Fluff" (Tony Iommi / Black Sabbath cover)	1:29
Total length:		17:29

== Personnel ==
- Tony Molina – vocals, guitar, drums, production
- Jasper Leach – piano, organ, bass, guitar, vocals, production
- Jack Shirley – engineering, mixing, mastering (Atomic Garden, Oakland)
- Bart Thurber – engineering (House of Faith, Oakland)
- Sarah Rose Janko – guest vocals
- Josh Mendoza - drums on track 3, 6, 13
- Garitt Heater - bass on track 2, 4, 8
- Frank Marchi - bass on track 6, 13
- Andrew Kerwin - lead guitar on track 13
- Nick Bassett - drums on track 11
