= Songs from San Mateo County =

Compilation album by Tony Molina
- Released: July 19, 2019
- Recorded: 2009–2015
- Genres: Power pop, lo-fi, indie rock, hardcore punk
- Length: 14:56
- Label: Smoking Room (SR030)

Tony Molina chronology
Kill the Lights (2018)	Songs from San Mateo County (2019)	In the Fade (2022)

Songs from San Mateo County is a compilation album by Bay Area musician Tony Molina, released on July 19, 2019, on the Smoking Room label. The album collects 14 previously unreleased and unfinished recordings made between 2009 and 2015, drawing on material from Molina's solo work and his earlier bands Ovens and Violent Change.

== Background ==
Molina assembled the album from recordings spanning the years before and during his solo career. The material predates his breakthrough debut Dissed and Dismissed (2013) and was recorded across a period during which Molina was active in the Bay Area underground punk and power pop scenes. The album was released on vinyl, cassette, and digitally through Smoking Room, an independent label that had also issued Molina's live cassette West Bay Grease (2017). It includes several songs previously released on West Bay Grease and Embarrassing Times.

Scott Russell of Paste called the album "his best yet," praising its economy and replay value: "14 minutes and 56 seconds… one of the most fun and re-listenable records so far in 2019."

== Critical reception ==
Professional ratings
Review scores
Source	Rating
All About Jazz	Positive
The Fire Note	Positive
Northern Transmissions	Positive
Paste	Positive
Post-Trash	Positive
Punknews.org	Positive

Songs from San Mateo County received positive reviews. All About Jazz called it "a cohesive, thrilling power pop record," while Post-Trash described it as delivering "fifteen more minutes of quality Tony Molina shreddery." The Fire Note awarded the album its "Headphone Approved" designation.

The album received an aggregate critic score of 78 on Album of the Year based on five reviews.

== Track listing ==
No.	Title	Length
1.	"Intro"	0:13
2.	"#1 Riff"	0:28
3.	"Not the Way to Be"	1:14
4.	"Can't Find My Way"	0:48
5.	"Don't See the Point"	0:54
6.	"I'm Not Down"	1:58
7.	"Fallin'"	1:15
8.	"Been Here Before"	0:57
9.	"Word Around Town"	1:13
10.	"Hard to Know"	0:43
11.	"Where'd You Go"	0:51
12.	"Separate Ways"	1:57
13.	"Don't See Me Now"	1:02
14.	"Outro"	1:10
Total length:		14:56
