= Whenever You're Ready =

Whenever You're Ready may refer to:

- Whenever You're Ready (album), a 1993 album by Flop
- "Whenever You're Ready" (The Zombies song), 1965
- "Whenever You're Ready" (Five Star song), 1987
- "Whenever You're Ready" (The Good Place), the series finale of The Good Place
- "Whenever You're Ready", a 2017 song by Europe from the album Walk the Earth
