= Sicko (band) =

American rock group

- Origin: Seattle, WA, United States
- Genres: Punk rock, pop punk
- Years active: 1991–2001, 2018–Present
- Labels: eMpTy; Top Drawer; Munster; Mutant Pop; Red Scare Industries
- Members: Denny Bartlett; Ean Hernandez; Josh Rubin

Sicko is an American rock group from Seattle, Washington, formed in 1991. Exceptionally, the three-piece pop punk group has maintained a constant membership for every recording as a band. This line-up is Denny Bartlett (guitar, bass, vocals), Ean Hernandez (guitar, bass, vocals), and Josh Rubin (drums, brother of Aaron Rubin from The Mr. T Experience). Although the band wrote and recorded an extensive catalog of original material throughout the mid-1990s, the group is perhaps best known for its punk-flavored cover of the song "Closer To Fine", originally written and recorded by the folk duo Indigo Girls.

Sicko released four full-length albums and five 7" eps as well as a retrospective CD with unreleased and rare material, a released demo and a tour video. They also appeared on approximately fourteen compilations on labels such as Lookout! Records and Liberation Records. They once exchanged covers with Cub. The vast majority of their recorded output was recorded by Kurt Bloch of The Fastbacks and released on Seattle-based punk label eMpTy Records. One EP and the retrospective CD were released on Mutant Pop Records. Three Sicko songs were featured on the Xbox game Project Gotham Racing 2 alongside artists like The Flaming Lips and Princess Superstar.

During its heyday - roughly 1993 to 1998 - Sicko actively played in numerous clubs throughout the Seattle area, and toured the United States, Spain, and Japan. A typical Sicko set would last about twenty songs lasting about 45–50 minutes, in a blistering, no-interruptions manner reminiscent of the Ramones or The Fastbacks (whose lo-fi style resembled Sicko, possibly in part due to Kurt Bloch's production input in the studio). Denny and Ean would typically switch places on the bass and guitar duties halfway through the set (and often handing each other their instruments while on stage). Sicko often split the bill with other bands that would eventually go on to achieve more national acclaim, including a show with Harvey Danger in 1994 at the (now defunct) Lake Union Pub, and several shows with The Presidents of the United States of America. The Sicko web site is still up at Sicko.com and was refreshed in October 2017.

On August 26, 2009, Red Scare Industries announced that they would be re-issuing the band's catalog digitally.

Sicko reformed to play one show on January 19, 2018, in support of the Seattle Pop Punk Festival.

On September 13, 2019, Sicko released a new compilation "In the Alternate Timeline" on Red Scare Records. In support, Sicko played shows in October and November 2019 in Seattle, Portland, San Francisco, and New York.

On September 1, 2024, Sicko self re-released their four full-length albums on LP and CD through their own record label Top Drawer Records, and reformed once again in support of the Seattle Pop Punk Festival.

== Albums ==
- You Can Feel the Love in this Room (eMpTy Records) 1994
  - Recorded and Mixed by Mr. Kurt Bloch at Egg Studio, Winter 1993. Released March 22, 1994
  - We recorded and mixed everything in about four days. I remember Kurt having a family emergency in the middle of recording so Scott McCaughey and Conrad Uno helped out pressing the buttons. The way it worked out, the solo on On the Clock was recorded two weeks after the rest of the tracks. Country is the only song not recorded at that session - it was recorded during the Red 7" session. The vinyl version included the bonus track Pain In The Ass, which incidentally is the first song we ever played together
- Laugh While You Can Monkey Boy (eMpTy Records) 1995
  - Recorded and Mixed by Mr. Kurt Bloch at House of Leisure January 7–8, 1995. Released May 24, 1995
  - We originally planned this to be an EP, but there were just enough tracks on it to call it a LP...at least that's what Blake from eMpTy said at the time. We recorded and mixed in two marathon days (poor Kurt was a good sport). The recording studio was in a big, boomy room, which I think is why the record sounds like it does. It's long since been bulldozed and replaced with condos. It was during this session that a photographer from The Rocket came and took our picture for the cover (an uncommon occurrence to be sure).
  - Vinyl released in Spain on Muster Records
- Chef Boyrudum (eMpTy Records) 1995
  - Recorded and Mixed by Mr. Kurt Bloch with "Pedal Board" Pete Gerrald at Hanszek Audio July 26–30, 1995. Released October 24, 1995
  - This was certainly our most ambitious project spending a whopping five days recording and mixing almost 20 songs
  - Vinyl released in Spain on Munster Records and on CD in Japan on Real Cool Records. Japanese CD contained the bonus track 80 Dollars from the Red 7" session
- You Are Not The Boss Of Me (eMpTy Records) 1997
  - Recorded and Produced by Pete Gerrald at Hanszek Audio, Summer 1997. Released October 28, 1997
  - This album is a collection of songs recorded over two sessions one in late 1996 and another in mid-1997
  - CD also released in Japan on Pizza of Death Records and in Europe. The Japanese CD has the bonus track 8.6 by the fabulous Japanese band Husking Bee. You can hear the real lyrics on their album "Grip". The European CD has a rather bad cover of Astro Zombies by The Misfits
- A Brief History of Sicko (Mutant Pop Records) 2000
  - Compiled from various studio and live recordings. Released posthumously on January 20, 2000
  - This is a collection of random tracks including our first ever demo tape (horrible) and one of our last shows (also pretty bad). But, tucked in there are some good tracks that we released on Mutant Pop and a cover of Panama, which is about how all Sicko practices ended
- In the Alternate Timeline (Red Scare Records) 2019
  - A compilation of previously released and remastered tracks

== Singles ==
- For a Longer and Better Life EP (Top Drawer Records) 1992
- Count Me Out 7" (eMpTy Records) 1993
- Split 7" w/ The Mr. T Experience (Top Drawer Records) 1993, (eMpTy Records) 1998
- Three Tea 7" (Mutant Pop) 1997

== Compilations ==
- V/A eMpTy Records Sampler vol. 1 (eMpTy Records) 1994
- V/A Viva La Vinyl (Deadbeat/Campground) 1994
- V/A 13 Soda Punx Compilation (Top Drawer Records/Munster Records) 1995
- V/A Teenage Kicks (Custodial Records) 1995
- V/A Punk Uprisings (Lookout! Records) 1995
- V/A La 1st Internacional (Munster Records) 1996
- V/A Keep The Beat (Hairball 8 Records) 1996
- V/A From Another World vol. 3 (Free with The Thing Magazine, Athens, Greece) 1996
- V/A La 2a Internacional (Munster Records) 1997
- V/A Poop Mixed With Pee (PooPee Records) 1997
- V/A eMpTy Sampler vol. 2 (eMpty Records) 1997
- V/A Joe Queer Presents More Bounce to the Ounce (Lookout! Records) 1997
- V/A Coolidge 50 (Coolidge Records) 1998
- V/A Killed By Crackle (Crackle Records) 2000
