= Answer the Phone, Dummy =

Studio album by Fastbacks
- Released: 1994
- Genre: Alternative pop
- Label: Sub Pop
- Producer: Kurt Bloch

Fastbacks chronology
Zücker (1993)	Answer the Phone, Dummy (1994)	Alone in a Furniture Warehouse (1996)

Answer the Phone, Dummy is an album by the American band Fastbacks, released in 1994. The band supported the album with a North American tour.

== Production ==
The album was produced by Kurt Bloch, who also wrote the songs. For the first time in their career, Fastbacks were able to record an album in a single studio, from beginning to end. The band used six different drummers during the recording sessions for Answer the Phone, Dummy.

== Critical reception ==
Professional ratings
Review scores
Source	Rating
AllMusic	3/5 stars
Chicago Tribune	3.5/4 stars
Daily Breeze	3.5/4 stars
MusicHound Rock: The Essential Album Guide	3/5 stars
Spin Alternative Record Guide	7/10

Trouser Press wrote that, "between the ganged-up female vocals and the raggedy, surging electric sound, the Fastbacks here resemble a looser-limbed Breeders." Greil Marcus, in Artforum, thought that, "as always, the smallest incidents of memory or present-day this-’n’-that rush forward with a sense of fate and consequence, practical joke and tragedy, puzzlement and wonder." The Chicago Tribune stated that "bassist Kim Warnick and guitarist Lulu Gargiulo are the primary vocalists, and they bring a diehard optimism to even Bloch's most plaintive laments ... Fastbacks deliver fashion-resistant songcraft straight out of the Buzzcocks/Ramones school of pop thrills."

The Times Colonist called the album "an off-centre, modern pop song cycle that is barbed with lyrical and sonic hooks," writing that "Warnick and Gargiulo's garage sale harmonies have an unpretentious, cheesy charm." The Vancouver Sun determined that, "with thrash, crash and some careful guitar musicianship, the band plays solid 'alternative' fare with a healthy dose of humor." The Daily Breeze concluded that "the band has found ways to upgrade its musical proficiency while losing none of its freshness."

AllMusic wrote that, "while Kurt Bloch wrote a batch of great tunes (as usual), this set lacks a certain aural cohesion the pacing is inconsistent, with the album sometimes struggling to maintain a steady momentum."

== Track listing ==
All tracks are written by Kurt Bloch.

No.	Title	Length
1.	"Waste of Time"
2.	"On the Wall"
3.	"Went for a Swim"
4.	"Old Address of the Unknown"
5.	"Back to Nowhere"
6.	"BRD 'Coated'"
7.	"I Found the Star"
8.	"And You"
9.	"On Your Hands"
10.	"I'm Cold"
11.	"T.H.I.N.K."
12.	"In the Observatory"
13.	"Trumpets Are Loud"
14.	"Meet the Author"
15.	"Future Right"
