= Confront the Truth =

2016 EP by Tony Molina

EP by Tony Molina
- Released: October 28, 2016
- Recorded: 2015–2016
- Studios: Atomic Garden (Palo Alto, CA); Turk and Taylor (San Francisco, CA)
- Genres: Acoustic, folk pop, power pop
- Length: 10:00
- Label: Slumberland

Tony Molina chronology
Six Tracks EP (2014)	Confront the Truth (2016)	Songs from San Mateo County (2019)

Confront the Truth is an EP by Bay Area musician Tony Molina, released on October 28, 2016, on Slumberland Records. The eight-track EP marked a significant stylistic departure from Molina's earlier guitar-driven work, replacing electric crunch with sparse acoustic arrangements. It runs approximately ten minutes.

Songs were recorded and mastered at Atomic Garden in Palo Alto, with the exception of track eight, "Banshee," which was recorded at Turk and Taylor in San Francisco to a Tascam 688. Layout, design, and photography were by Sean Hewitt.

== Background ==
The EP represented a departure from the electric power pop of Molina's debut Dissed and Dismissed (2013) and the Six Tracks EP (2013). Slumberland Records described the record as owing "as much to early Bee Gees and Teenage Fanclub's mellower moments as they do to Georges Harrison and Martin," and noted that it packs "more melodic flair and emotional truth into 11 minutes than most bands manage in an hour." The EP's closing track, "Banshee," is a cover of a Thin Lizzy instrumental.

Liner notes were written by Doug Mosurock, who described the EP as "a significant advancement in his style and approach" and observed that the music "is at once what I believe to be the quintessential encapsulation of the turmoil of West Coast youth."

== Critical reception ==
Professional ratings
Review scores
Source	Rating
AllMusic	Positive
The Fire Note	Positive
Indie Music Review	Positive

The Fire Note described the EP as "a new approach for Molina," noting that "the music here is gentle, fragile and carries more emotional weight" than his earlier releases, and singling out Molina's vocal performance: "you get to hear Molina's true singing voice and guess what — he can really sing!" Indie Music Review called the opening track "Lisa's Song" "completely blown away by as it immediately pulled me in by how gentle yet powerfully moving it was."

In a 2026 interview, Tony Molina claimed that "No One Told He" from Confront the Truth was his worst song, adding that:

I was real faded and very sick in all aspects when this song ["No One Told He"] came about. I think at the time in my barely-functioning, cooked-ass brain I thought I was doing some kind of ‘68 Beatles / George Harrison nod with this one. Now in 2026, I have the mental clarity to realize that this song is more of a nightmare early ’70s soft rock AM radio, Crosby Stills & Nash, barefoot-bearded guy, CIA plant, hanging in the Canyon asshole nightmare song from hell. Basically everything gross, swagless and bad is front and center in this song.

Molina added that "I made a lot of bad music in my drinking years, I just think ["No One Told He"] is number one."

== Track listing ==
No.	Title	Length
1.	"Lisa's Song" (instrumental)
2.	"I Don't Want to Know"
3.	"Old Enough to Know"
4.	"No One Told He"
5.	"Hung Up on the Dream"
6.	"See Me Fall"
7.	"Over Now"
8.	"Banshee" (Thin Lizzy cover)
Total length:		10:00

== Personnel ==
- Tony Molina — vocals, guitar
- Recorded and mastered at Atomic Garden, Palo Alto, CA (tracks 1–7)
- Track 8 recorded at Turk and Taylor, San Francisco, CA to Tascam 688
- Layout, design and photography by Sean Hewitt
