= Kill the Lights (Tony Molina album) =

Studio album by Tony Molina
- Released: July 27, 2018
- Genres: Power pop; indie rock; folk rock
- Label: Slumberland

Tony Molina chronology
| Confront the Truth (2016) | Kill the Lights (2018) | Songs from San Mateo County (2019) |

Kill the Lights is an album by Bay Area musician Tony Molina, released on July 27, 2018 on Slumberland Records. It was the fourth solo release under his own name following Dissed and Dismissed (2013/2014), the Six Tracks EP (2013), and Confront the Truth (2016).

== Critical reception ==
Kill the Lights was named Stereogum's Album of the Week upon its release in July 2018. The album also received positive coverage from Paste and Vice magazines. It received a critic score of 77 on Album of the Year, aggregating nine critical assessments.

== Track listing ==
| No. | Title | Length |
|---|---|---|
| 1. | "Nothing I Can Say" | 1:11 |
| 2. | "Wrong Town" | 1:16 |
| 3. | "Afraid to Go Outside" | 1:19 |
| 4. | "Now That She's Gone" | 1:15 |
| 5. | "Jasper's Theme" (written for Jasper Leach) | 2:01 |
| 6. | "Give He Take You" | 1:24 |
| 7. | "When She Leaves" | 1:23 |
| 8. | "Look Inside Your Mind / Losin' Touch" | 2:26 |
| 9. | "Before You Go" | 1:10 |
| 10. | "Outro" | 1:01 |
| Total length: | | 14:00 |
