= Alicia Vanden Heuvel =

American musician and producer based in the San Francisco Bay Area

Alicia Vanden Heuvel is a Bay Area-based musician, producer, recording engineer, and music video director. She is best known as the bassist of the Aislers Set, and as the owner and operator of Speakeasy Studios, an independent recording studio and record label.

== Musical work ==
Vanden Heuvel has been the member of at least eighteen bands, including the Aislers Set, the Tony Molina Band, Poundsign, Magic Trick, and Still Flyin'.

== Production work ==
Vanden Heuvel runs Speakeasy Studios, a San Francisco-based recording studio and (as of 2022) record label. She has also directed multiple music videos for bands on Speakeasy Studios, including three videos for The Lost Days.

== Personal life ==
Vanden Heuvel is married to singer-songwriter Tony Molina. The couple co-produced and recorded Molina's 2025 album On This Day in their home studio, which was co-released on Vanden Heuvel's label, Speakeasy Studios SF.

== Discography ==
=== Studio albums ===
==== The Aislers Set ====
Year	Title	Artist	Label	Format	Role
1998	Terrible Things Happen	The Aislers Set	Slumberland Records	CD, LP	Bass
2000	The Last Match	The Aislers Set	Slumberland Records	CD, LP	Bass
2003	How I Learned to Write Backwards	The Aislers Set	Slumberland Records/Suicide Squeeze Records	CD, LP	Bass

==== Other bands ====
Year	Title	Artist	Label	Format	Role
1996	The Almondy Many	Poundsign	Fantastic Records	LP	Guitar, Vocals, Design
1998	Wavelength	Poundsign	Fantastic Records	CD, LP	Guitar, Vocals, Keyboards, Bass, Drums
1999	Summer in Minsk	Essiar	Radio Khartoum	CD, Mini-album	Performer
2002	Underneath the Marquee	Poundsign	Fantastic Records	CD, LP	Guitar, Drums, Piano, Synthesizer, Bass
2011	Tim Cohen's Magic Trick	Tim Cohen's Magic Trick	Captured Tracks	LP	Performer
