= The Lost Days =

American indie pop duo

- Origin: Oakland, California, U.S.
- Genres: Jangle pop; indie folk; lo-fi
- Years active: 2021–present
- Labels: Speakeasy Studios SF; The Long Road Society
- Members: Tony Molina; Sarah Rose Janko

The Lost Days are an American musical duo from Oakland, California, consisting of singer-songwriter Tony Molina and Sarah Rose Janko of the band Dawn Riding. The pair formed the project in 2021 after meeting at a memorial service for a mutual friend, and have released an EP and a full-length album of lo-fi, home-recorded folk-pop songs.

The duo's debut album, In the Store, was released on 17 March 2023 by Speakeasy Studios SF, an independent label run by Alicia Vanden Heuvel of The Aislers Set.

== History ==
Molina met Janko at a memorial service for a mutual friend in the early 2020s. The two had been fans of each other's musical projects, and began playing acoustic guitars and singing together at Janko's warehouse apartment in East Oakland.

In April 2021, the duo released a five-song extended play, Lost Demos, on cassette through the Oakland label The Long Road Society; it was later issued on vinyl. After Janko moved to New Orleans and the COVID-19 pandemic limited in-person collaboration, Molina wrote a second batch of songs with Janko's voice in mind and sent demos to her remotely.

The pair recorded their debut album, In the Store, at musician Nick Bassett's home studio in Oakland using a Yamaha MT8X eight-track tape recorder. Bassett contributed drums and keyboards, and Jasper Leach played piano and Hammond organ on the title track. The 10-song album, which runs approximately 14 minutes, was released on 17 March 2023.

== Musical style ==
The Lost Days play short, lo-fi folk-pop songs recorded to analog tape in a DIY home-recording tradition. Critics have identified the influence of the Byrds, Bill Fox, Dear Nora, and Guided by Voices, particularly the cassette-recorded aesthetic of Guided by Voices' early-1990s output.

== Discography ==
=== Albums ===
- In the Store (Speakeasy Studios SF, 2023)

=== Extended plays ===
- Lost Demos (The Long Road Society, 2021)
