= Tony Molina =

American singer-songwriter and guitarist

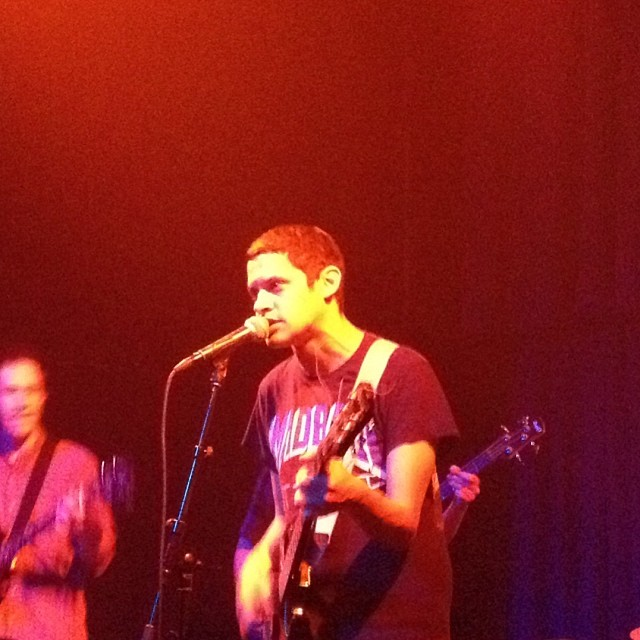

Background information
- Born: 1985 (age 40–41)
- Origin: Millbrae, California
- Genres: indie rock; power pop; hardcore punk
- Years active: 2001 - present
- Labels: Slumberland, Matador
- Member of: The Lost Days
- Formerly of: Dystrophy; Ovens; Violent Change
- Website: Bandcamp

Tony Molina (b. 1985) is an American singer-songwriter and guitarist from Millbrae, California. He began playing in hardcore punk bands as a teenager and young adult before establishing himself as a solo performer of indie rock and power pop songs. He has released albums on Slumberland and Matador Records.

Molina was previously a member of Ovens and Violent Change. His solo career began in 2008, when two friends could not show up to a recording session, and asked him to take the session for them. Molina agreed, and recorded his solo songs during that session. These recordings became his debut solo album, Embarrassing Times.

Molina’s second solo album, Dissed and Dismissed, was awarded a score of 7.5 out of 10 by Pitchfork Magazine. His follow-up album, Kill the Lights, was named Stereogum's album of the week in July 2018, and received praise from Paste and Vice magazines. Molina also recorded and toured with The Softies and released material as The Lost Days, a duo with Sarah Rose Janko of Dawn Riding.

Molina is married to Alicia Vanden Heuvel of the Aislers Set. The couple co-produced and recorded Molina's 2025 album On This Day in their home studio, which was co-released on Vanden Heuvel's label, Speakeasy Studios SF. Vanden Heuvel also directed several music videos for In the Store, Molina and Janko's debut album as the Lost Days.

In 2026, Paste listed Molina as one of the 75 best guitarists of the 21st Century.

== Discography ==
=== Studio albums ===
Title	Year	Label	Notes
Embarrassing Times	2013	650 Tapes (2009), Catholic Guilt Records (2023)	Debut album. Initial release was 50 cassette copies, offered for free with mail-order copies of Ovens's self-titled record from Aquarius Records. Re-released on vinyl in 2023.
Dissed and Dismissed	2013	Melters / Slumberland	Originally released in a limited pressing of 500 copies; reissued by Slumberland in 2014
Kill the Lights	2018	Slumberland Records	Named Stereogum's Album of the Week
Songs from San Mateo County	2019	Smoking Room	Rarities compilation of unreleased and unfinished material recorded 2009–2015
In the Fade	2022	Summer Shade / Run for Cover Records	
On This Day	2025	Slumberland Records / Speakeasy Studios SF / Olde Fade	21 tracks in 23 minutes

=== EPs ===
Title	Year	Label	Notes
Six Tracks EP	2013	Matador Records	Released as part of Matador's Singles Going Home Alone series; B-side features a cover of Metallica's "Orion"
Confront the Truth	2016	Slumberland Records	Eight-track acoustic EP
West Bay Grease	2017	Smoking Room	Solo live cassette recorded at 1234 Go Records, Oakland; limited to 50 copies
Pacific Northwest Tour	2023		Tour EP

=== Collaborative releases ===
Title	Year	Artist	Label
Live in San Francisco	2021	Rose Melberg & Tony Molina	Self-released
Tony Molina & The Softies	2023	Tony Molina & The Softies	Slumberland Records

== Band discography ==
Molina has recorded as a member of several bands throughout his career.

=== Violent Change ===
Title	Year	Label
Suck on the Gun	2012	Melters

=== Caged Animal ===
Title	Year	Label
Caged Animal EP	2013	Melters

=== Ovens ===
Title	Year	Format	Label	Notes
Ovens	2009	CD (44 tracks)	tUMULt	Compiled from mid-2000s sessions; first release of the recordings
Ovens 7"	2011	7" vinyl (8 tracks)	Catholic Guilt Records	Songs from 2008 recording sessions
7"	2014	7" vinyl (4 tracks)	Melters (MELT004)	Recorded in 2005 by Kurt Bloch; mastered by Paul Oldham
Ovens	2022	2×LP, 45 RPM (Tankcrimes TC131)	Tankcrimes	First vinyl pressing of the 2009 CD; first time on streaming platforms; 200 black / 1,800 white vinyl

=== The Lost Days ===
Title	Year	Format	Label	Notes
Lost Demos	2021	Cassette, LP	The Long Road Society, Mapache Records (rerelease)	First release
In The Store	2023	LP, CDr	Speakeasy Studios SF	
