= Tiny Shapes =

2020 studio album by R.E. Seraphin

Studio album by R.E. Seraphin
- Released: March 13, 2020
- Studio: Alcatraz Manor, Berkeley, California
- Genre: Power pop, jangle pop, indie rock
- Label: Paisley Shirt Records, Mt. St. Mtn.
- Producer: Jasper Leach, R.E. Seraphin

R.E. Seraphin chronology
Tiny Shapes (2020)	A Room Forever (2021)

Tiny Shapes is the debut studio album by American indie rock musician R.E. Seraphin (Ray Seraphin), released in March 2020 through Paisley Shirt Records and Mt. St. Mtn. The album was produced by Seraphin and Jasper Leach at Alcatraz Manor in Berkeley, California. In 2025, Tiny Shapes was reissued by Take A Turn Records on a double LP paired with Seraphin's 2021 follow-up EP, A Room Forever.

== Background and recording ==
Seraphin was previously the frontman of the San Francisco group Talkies before launching the R.E. Seraphin project as a solo vehicle. Tiny Shapes was recorded with Jasper Leach, who served as co-producer, engineer, and multi-instrumentalist on the sessions. Leach contributed electric guitar, keyboards, percussion, and backing vocals in addition to his production work.

== Reception ==
Tiny Shapes received favorable reviews from independent music publications. Writing for Counterzine, Trent Schwartz called the album "a true joy from end to end" and noted its blend of power pop hooks with the "frenetic energy" of post-punk. The cassette-focused publication Tabs Out reviewed the album as part of its coverage of contemporary indie cassette releases. In Maximum Rocknroll, Allan McNaughton compared the song "Fortuna" to "All My Senses" by Grant Hart.

Tim Hinely of Dagger Zine praised the album's songwriting and Seraphin's vocal delivery. The blog I Don't Hear A Single reviewed the album in April 2020, and When You Motor Away reviewed it alongside A Room Forever the following year.

Following the 2025 reissue, The Big Takeover reviewed the combined Tiny Shapes / A Room Forever double LP, with a substantial reassessment of both releases. The Glasgow-based record shop and reviewer Monorail Music also published a long-form review of the reissue.

== Personnel ==
Personnel adapted from Bandcamp liner notes.

- R.E. Seraphin – vocals, guitars, songwriting
- Jasper Leach – co-producer, recording engineer, mixer, electric guitar, keyboards, percussion, backing vocals

== Release history ==
Year	Label	Format	Notes
2020	Paisley Shirt Records, Mt. St. Mtn.	LP, cassette, digital	Original release
2025	Take A Turn Records	2×LP, digital	Reissue paired with A Room Forever EP (2021)
