= Violent Change =

American lo-fi rock band from the San Francisco Bay Area

- Origin: San Francisco Bay Area, California, U.S.
- Genres: Lo-fi; noise pop; indie pop; power pop; post-punk
- Years active: 2011–present
- Labels: Melters Records; Catholic Guilt Records; It Takes Two Records; Sloth Mate Productions
- Members: Matt Bleyle
- Past members: Tony Molina • Sterling Mackinnon

Violent Change is a Bay Area lo-fi rock project founded in 2011 by singer-songwriter Matt Bleyle (also credited as Gladys Bleyle). Bleyle is the band's sole constant member, serving as vocalist, chief songwriter, producer, and engineer, with a rotating cast of collaborators contributing across recordings and live performances. The band has released material on several independent labels, including Melters Records, Catholic Guilt Records, It Takes Two Records, and Bleyle's own Sloth Mate Productions.

Violent Change emerged from the same Bay Area underground scene that produced Ty Segall, Thee Oh Sees, Life Stinks, and CCR Headcleaner, though the band's music was characterized by critics as darker and more introspective than the prevailing garage-rock sound of the early 2010s. The band's recordings, typically made on cassette and released in small vinyl pressings, became sought-after objects in underground record-collecting circles.

== Background ==
Matt Bleyle grew up in Mill Valley, California. As a teenager, he discovered punk and hardcore after growing disillusioned with commercial radio. His first band, Psycho 78, formed in the late 1990s after Bleyle was recruited as a drummer by singer Bobby Adopted. The band rehearsed in a grange hall across from San Quentin State Prison and opened for British punk group the Partisans.

Bleyle then co-founded the Abi Yoyos in 2001 with Shawn Mehrens and Jeff Mitchell. The group's name was drawn from an African folktale adapted by folk singer Pete Seeger. The Abi Yoyos released a 7" single, "The World Is Not My Home," and the full-length album, Mill Valley. The Abi Yoyos dissolved in 2007.

Bleyle next formed Sopors, described by Aquarius Records as "a short-lived SF band that existed in the same scene that birthed pop geniuses the Ovens," praising the band's "insane catchiness" and "most irresistible hooks" set against "churning lo-fi riffage." He also briefly played with Yankee Kamikaze, and participated in the hardcore group Caged Animal alongside Tony Molina. He contributed to Rat Columns, a project led by Australian songwriter David West.

== History ==
=== Formation and debut EP (2012) ===
Violent Change began as a series of home recordings Bleyle started in 2011, initially distributed as hand-dubbed cassette tapes that sold out quickly. Tony Molina and Sterling Mackinnon, early members, encouraged Bleyle to take the recordings into a live setting.

The band's first official release, the four-track EP Suck on the Gun, appeared on Melters Records in October 2012 as the label's inaugural release (catalog: MELT001). The initial lineup featured Bleyle alongside Molina, Mackinnon on guitar, and Rohit Rao on drums. A release show was held at The New Parish in Oakland, with support from POW!, Scrapers, and Die Hard.

=== Self-titled debut LP (2013) ===
Violent Change's self-titled debut album was released in early 2013 on Catholic Guilt Records, a San Francisco label run by Michael Harkin, in a pressing of 330 copies on black vinyl. The album was assembled largely from cassette recordings Bleyle made between autumn 2011 and summer 2012, the majority recorded by himself alone. Four tracks--"I Don't Know Why," "Detention Camp," and two Molina-penned songs, "Word Around Town" and "No One Left To Blame"--were recorded with the full band; Mackinnon also contributed accordion to "Sleeping Fuhrer." The live band at the time of release consisted of Bleyle, Mackinnon (guitar), Jake Bayley (bass), and Blaine Patrick (drums).

Bleyle recorded the album in a converted meat-locker rehearsal space in the Tenderloin district of San Francisco. The SF Weekly noted this location as emblematic of a generation of San Francisco musicians "exiled deep underground, or to the city's margins, where they turn frustration over a prohibitively expensive renters' market into brash and urgent music." In a 2013 scene report, the SF Weekly placed Violent Change's debut alongside those of Life Stinks, CCR Headcleaner, and Scraper as suggesting "a music scene thriving anew, but darkened and on-edge."

The East Bay Express described the album's songwriting as centering on "fully realized songs about strange subjects obscured by poor recording," singling out "Word Around Town" for "hijack[ing] the bittersweet melancholy of Nineties' college rock to produce a break-up song with a soaring guitar solo." The Catholic Guilt Records label called it "a future classic of the pop underground" and "easily our favorite San Francisco album since the Hospitals' Hairdryer Peace." The East Bay Express later selected "Walmart Parking Lot," the album's closing track, as one of the definitive local rock moments of 2013, calling it "one of the finest local rock statements of 2013."

=== A Celebration of Taste (2014) ===
After Molina and Rao left the project, Bleyle recorded the band's second album, A Celebration of Taste, almost entirely alone, with contributions from Mackinnon and Blaine Patrick. The 13-track LP was released on Melters Records in June 2014, available only on vinyl and not digitally streaming.

The East Bay Express described the album as exploring "the sonic decay of magnetic tape and overdriven gear," concluding: "Rather than sounding torn between two styles, Bleyle makes a case for fusing them together. Call it a gorgeous wreck." The record's cover song--an unreleased Phil Ochs track, "You Can't Get Stoned Enough"--was read by one critic as key to the album's emotional logic, "the sound of a voice crying in the wilderness."

=== VC3 (2016) ===
The band's third LP, VC3, was co-released by Melters Records and It Takes Two Records in September 2016 (catalog: MELT008 / ITT-003). The live band at the time included Jess Sylvester, Alexa Pantalone, and Stanley Martinez, drawn from Bay Area acts Rays and Life Stinks. Vice's Noisey music channel described it as "heart-on-sleeve hazy pop," comparing Bleyle's approach to Guided by Voices, Chris Bell's I Am the Cosmos, Chris Knox, and Ray Davies. The Melters Bandcamp page placed the album alongside Shoes' One in Versailles and Chris Bell's I Am the Cosmos as a work of "lonesome romanticism."

The East Bay Express included VC3 on its list of the top sixteen Bay Area music releases of 2016, writing: "Matt Bleyle plays most of the instruments on Violent Change's four records released since 2012, which sets a roughshod rock foundation beneath his arresting melodies... the struggle between grandeur and grime is more compelling than either quality can achieve alone."

=== Later releases (2020–present) ===
Following a seven-year gap between studio albums--during which Bleyle underwent surgeries and the band continued to perform live--Violent Change released the Squandered 7" on Sloth Mate Productions in 2020. A split record with Honey Radar was released in 2022 on Chunklet Industries. The fourth LP, Starcastle, followed in 2023, produced primarily by Stanley Martinez, who had become Bleyle's chief creative collaborator.

In 2024, Bleyle released a separate collaborative LP as Cuneiform Tabs, a correspondence recording project with Sterling Mackinnon (of The False Berries), compiled from eighteen months of recordings exchanged between California and the UK, limited to 200 copies.

=== Sloth Mate Productions ===
Bleyle founded Sloth Mate Productions as an independent record label, co-operating it with Stanley Martinez. In 2024, Bandcamp Daily profiled Sloth Mate as part of a feature on Bay Area tape labels, quoting Bleyle on the release show for Oakland group Children Maybe Later's 2022 debut What a Flash Kick! at The Rite Spot, a Mission District bar and venue: "There was something magical about that combination. Maybe it was hearing songs about vampires while people were eating spaghetti."

== Musical style ==
AllMusic describes Violent Change as "a lo-fi noise pop group led by San Francisco garage punk regular Matt Bleyle, submerging heartbroken melodies in tape fuzz," noting that the band's "heart-on-sleeve power pop tunes" are "submerged in feedback, effects, and tape hiss so that the lyrics (which are often breakup-themed) are barely intelligible," while "the feelings of loneliness and heartache are clearly audible."

Critics have placed the band in the tradition of Guided by Voices and the lo-fi aesthetic of Pavement, while also noting debts to post-punk and the Dunedin sound of New Zealand. The SF Weekly situated Violent Change within a cohort of San Francisco bands that, unlike the preceding garage-pop scene, channeled the city's economic pressures into "brash and urgent music" with a distinctly "darker and on-edge" qualit, and noted that Violent Change's debut insert artwork bore the slogan "Hate is not an enemy."

== Discography ==
=== Violent Change ===
Year	Title	Label	Catalog #	Format
2012	Suck on the Gun	Melters Records	MELT001	7" EP
2013	Violent Change	Catholic Guilt Records	--	LP (330 copies)
2013	Basement Chain	Melters Records	--	Cassette
2014	A Celebration of Taste	Melters Records	--	LP
2014	Violent Change 7"	Melters Records	--	7"
2015	Everybody Loves Chris	Melters Records	--	Cassette/Digital
2016	Violent Change S/T CS	Sloth Mate Productions	--	Cassette
2016	VC3	Melters Records / It Takes Two Records	MELT008 / ITT-003	LP
2020	Squandered	Sloth Mate Productions	--	7"
2022	Honey Radar / Violent Change (split)	Chunklet Industries	--	LP
2023	Starcastle	Sloth Mate Productions	--	LP
