= Big Love (Burner Herzog album) =

Studio album by Burner Herzog
- Released: July 24, 2020
- Studios: Donut Time Audio, Santo, Alcatraz Manor, New, Improved Recording, Pacifica Community Television, and Oakland Music Complex
- Genres: Indie rock, psychedelic pop
- Label: Paisley Shirt Records
- Producers: Paul Korte, Chris Daddio

Burner Herzog chronology
Wonderful American (2017)	Big Love (2020)	Random Person (2023)

Big Love is a studio album by Burner Herzog, the recording project of songwriter Jasper Leach. The album was released on July 24, 2020, by Paisley Shirt Records on cassette and CD. Big Love was preceded by the 2017 mini-album Wonderful American and followed by Burner Herzog's 2023 album Random Person.

== Background and recording ==
Big Love was recorded across six San Francisco Bay Area studios: Donut Time Audio and Santo in Oakland; Alcatraz Manor in Berkeley; New, Improved Recording and Oakland Music Complex in Oakland; and Pacifica Community Television in Pacifica, California. The album was co-produced by Paul Korte and Chris Daddio and mastered by Will Kreppel. Korte had also co-produced Burner Herzog's previous release, Wonderful American (2017).

== Release and reception ==
Big Love was released on July 24, 2020, during the COVID-19 pandemic, precluding a conventional tour cycle. The album was streamed in advance by Austin Town Hall, and the video for "Lucky Star" premiered on Week in Pop in December 2020. RIFF Magazine published a full review of the album, praising Leach's songwriting and the album's tonal range.

In an interview with The Family Reviews, Leach cited Fleetwood Mac's Tango in the Night as an influence on the album's composition, especially the bonus CD with "Beach Boys homages, Stonesish druggy rants, Sabbath-like thunder, a Kraftwerk-y instrumental, and a shocking number of other tracks that wouldn't sound out of place on an indie album today." Leach was also inspired by how his bandmate Tony Molina would create a song entirely in the studio, starting with the drums.

In a 2023 retrospective for RIFF Magazine tied to the release of Random Person, critic David Gill characterized Big Love as a key entry in Burner Herzog's discography and discussed its songwriting and production approach.

== Track listing ==
All tracks are written by Jasper Leach, except where noted.

No.	Title	Writer(s)	Length
1.	"Bob Dylan Is a CIA Man"		3:36
2.	"Rubble"		2:53
3.	"Hard Times"		3:08
4.	"You and I" (Silver Apples cover)	Simeon Coxe	3:53
5.	"Lucky Star"		3:03
6.	"Prayer Candles"		3:23
7.	"I Need Your Love"		2:46
8.	"Big Man"		4:29
Total length:			27:22

== Personnel ==
Credits adapted from the album's Bandcamp release page.

- Burner Herzog (Jasper Leach) –– songwriting, vocals, multiple instruments
- Paul Korte – producer
- Chris Daddio – producer; additional instrumentation
- Will Kreppel – mastering; additional instrumentation
- Charlemagne Charmaine – performer
- Brian Davy – performer
- Eric Mohammed – performer
- Alison Niedbalski – performer
- Manny Chocano – additional instrumentation
- Tyler English – pedal steel guitar
- Blaine Patrick – additional instrumentation
- Zachary Thorne – trumpet
- Mike Harris – cover art
