= Dawn Riding =

American folk band

- Origin: Oakland, California, U.S.
- Genres: Americana; Indie folk; Alt-country
- Years active: 2019–present
- Labels: The Long Road Society; Speakeasy Studios SF
- Members: Sarah Rose Janko; Hall McCann; Jasmyn Wong

Dawn Riding is an American folk band from Oakland, California. The group is led by singer-songwriter Sarah Rose Janko. The group has released three studio albums: Last Spring (2019), The Light (2021), and You're Still Here (2022). Critics describe the band's sound as Americana with elements of folk, country, and dream pop, anchored by Janko's storytelling-focused songwriting.

== History ==
Dawn Riding formed in Oakland with Sarah Rose Janko on lead vocals and acoustic guitar, Jasmyn Wong on drums, and Hall McCann on harmony vocals and electric guitar. The debut, Last Spring, came out in 2019 on the Bay Area label The Long Road Society.

The seven-track The Light followed on 25 June 2021. Reviewers called it a country-rooted "drama-noir love story" with elements of dream pop and indie rock.

In 2021, Janko relocated to New Orleans. She returned to the San Francisco Bay Area during the COVID-19 pandemic to record Dawn Riding's third album, You're Still Here. Alicia Vanden Heuvel of the Aislers Set produced the record at her Speakeasy Studios SF home studio in San Francisco. The eight-song album was released on 11 November 2022 by The Long Road Society and Speakeasy Studios SF.

Around this period, Janko also began the duo The Lost Days with Bay Area songwriter Tony Molina.

== Musical style ==
Critics describe Dawn Riding's music as Americana with elements of folk, country, and dream pop. Americana UK noted that Janko's vocals alternate between soft and powerful tones. Her songs cover troubled relationships and political themes. "The Difference" from You're Still Here references the 2020 protests following the murder of George Floyd and the killing of Breonna Taylor. "Change in Tide" is an elegy for a friend who died of COVID-19. Janko has cited Lucinda Williams and Townes Van Zandt as influences on her songwriting.

== Discography ==
=== Studio albums ===
- Last Spring (The Long Road Society, 2019)
- The Light (The Long Road Society, 2021)
- You're Still Here (The Long Road Society / Speakeasy Studios SF, 2022)
