= The Last Match (album) =

Studio album by The Aislers Set
- Released: June 6, 2000
- Studio: Band members' home studios
- Genre: Indie pop
- Length: 35:43
- Language: English
- Label: Slumberland Records

The Aislers Set chronology
Terrible Things Happen (1998)	The Last Match (2000)	How I Learned to Write Backwards (2003)

The Last Match is the second full-length studio album by American indie pop band The Aislers Set, released by Slumberland Records in 2000. It has received positive reviews from critics.

== Reception ==
Editors at AllMusic rated this album 4.5 out of 5 stars, with critic Tim DiGravina writing that the band's style rises above its pop influences, such as Pet Sounds and His Name Is Alive and while he continued that "the album suffers due to the band's style browsing, these songs "suggest... that there's a great album lurking just beyond their influences and retro desires". At Exclaim!, Cam Lindsey reviewed all three of the band's full-length studio albums upon their 2014 rerelease, scoring them a 9 out of 10, stating that this album has more of a band feel than the previous album that was dominated by songwriter and vocalist Amy Linton which brings "more cohesion to the songs". Editors at Pitchfork scored this release 8.1 out of 10 and critic Jason Heller called this release a "near-perfect unpacking of" the band's influences and continued that "listening to the album is like popping bubble wrap, and just as satisfyingly addictive". Writing for PopMatters in 2014, John L. Murphy rated the band's first two albums a 7 out of 10 and characterized it as "a challenge that perplexes as well as pleases the listener" that "can feel epic, if uneven, too". Jim Glauner wrote an overview of the band for Trouser Press where he called The Last Match "better realized and more self-assured" than the debut.

== Track listing ==
All songs written by Amy Linton, except where noted.

1. "The Way to Market Station" – 3:13
2. "Hit the Snow" – 2:45
3. "Chicago New York" (Wyatt Cusick) – 2:21
4. "One Half Laughing" – 2:02
5. "Been Hiding" – 2:03
6. "Balloon Song" (The 14 Iced Bears) – 2:40
7. "Lonely Side of Town" (Cusick) – 1:50
8. "Last Match" – 3:12
9. "Christmas Song" [liner notes state that the song "wrote itself"] – 2:14
10. "The Walk" (Linton and Dustin Reske) – 2:53
11. "The Red Door" – 2:47
12. "Fairnt Chairnt" – 2:50
13. "We Give Up" (Cusick) – 1:57
14. "Bang Bang Bang" – 3:03

== Personnel ==
"The Way to Market Station"

- Amy Linton – instrumentation, vocals

"Hit the Snow"

- Jen Cohen – organ
- Wyatt Cusick – guitar, toy xylophone, acoustic bass, Casio keyboards
- Amy Linton – guitar, percussion, vocals
- Yoshi Nakamoto – drums
- Alicia Vanden Heuvel – bass guitar

"Chicago New York"

- Wyatt Cusick – guitar, bass guitar, organ, percussion
- Amy Linton – guitar
- Yoshi Nakamoto – drums

"One Half Laughing"

- Jen Cohen – organ
- Amy Linton – guitar, percussion, vocals
- Yoshi Nakamoto – drums
- Alicia Vanden Heuvel – bass guitar

"Been Hiding"

- Wyatt Cusick – guitar
- Amy Linton – drums, bass guitar, guitar, vocals

"Balloon Song"

- Jen Cohen – bass guitar
- Amy Linton – guitar, tambourine, vocals
- Yoshi Nakamoto – drums
- Alicia Vanden Heuvel – organ

"Lonely Side of Town"

- Wyatt Cusick – all instrumentation other than drums
- Yoshi Nakamoto – drums

"Last Match"

- Jen Cohen – organ
- Wyatt Cusick – guitar
- Amy Linton – trumpet, organ, vocals
- Yoshi Nakamoto – drums
- Alicia Vanden Heuvel – bass guitar

"Christmas Song"

- Amy Linton – guitar, trumpet, organ, percussion
- Yoshi Nakamoto – drums

"The Walk"

- Wyatt Cusick – piano, vocals
- Amy Linton – guitar, bass guitar, percussion, vocals
- Yoshi Nakamoto – drums
- Dustin Reske – organ
- Alicia Vanden Heuvel – vocals

"The Red Door"

- Jen Cohen – organ
- Wyatt Cusick – guitar, vocals
- Amy Linton – guitar, vocals
- Yoshi Nakamoto – drums
- Alicia Vanden Heuvel – bass guitar, vocals

"Fairnt Chairnt"

- Jen Cohen – organ
- Amy Linton – guitar, trumpet, percussion, vocals
- Yoshi Nakamoto – drums
- Alicia Vanden Heuvel – bass guitar

"We Give Up"

- Jen Cohen – organ
- Wyatt Cusick – guitar, vocals
- Amy Linton – guitar, vocals
- Yoshi Nakamoto – drums
- Alicia Vanden Heuvel – bass guitar

"Bang Bang Bang"

- Amy Linton – guitar, bass guitar, melodica, trumpet, tack piano, vocals

Additional personnel

- Alistair Fitchett – liner notes
- Record Technology Incorporated – 3757 – audio mastering

== See also ==
- List of 2000 albums
