= Six Tracks EP =

2013 EP by Tony Molina

Studio album by Tony Molina
- Released: October 1, 2013
- Genre: Power pop, indie rock, lo-fi, punk rock
- Length: 13:10
- Label: Matador Records
- Producer: Bart Thurber

Tony Molina chronology
Dissed and Dismissed (2013)	Six Tracks EP (2013)	Confront the Truth (2016)

Six Tracks EP is an EP released by Tony Molina on Matador Records in 2013.

== Contents ==
True to its name, Six Tracks EP contains six songs on a 7" single, all but one of them under 90 seconds long. All songs were written by Molina, except for the last track, Orion, a Metallica cover.

== Release ==
The EP was part of Matador's "Singles Going Home Alone" series, a subscription series that sent subscribers a new 7" vinyl record every month, plus a 13th single at the end of the year. This series included releases by Superchunk, Mission of Burma, and Steve Gunn.

The first single released from Six Tracks EP was "Breakin' Up," which Pitchfork's Lindsay Zoladz described as "economical" and a "power-pop gem." Stereogum's reviewer praised the song, writing that it "stuffs so much feeling (not to mention a great guitar solo) into such a short run time that it totally justifies many, many replays." Spin's reviewer described the song as "a 90-second slice of power-pop genius."

== Post-release tours ==
Molina toured with Fucked Up to promote the EP in October 2013. In 2014, he toured with Against Me! throughout the United States.

== Track listing ==
No.	Title	Length
1.	"Lazy"	1:21
2.	"Bad Weather"	0:53
3.	"Breakin' Up"	1:29
4.	"Over It"	0:53
5.	"Moving to Pacifica"	0:41
6.	"Orion" (Metallica cover)	3:51
