= Random Person =

2023 album by Burner Herzog

Studio album by Burner Herzog
- Released: October 6, 2023
- Recorded: November 2021 – April 2022
- Studios: BC Studio, Gowanus, Brooklyn
- Genre: Indie rock
- Label: Take a Turn Records
- Producer: Martin Bisi

Burner Herzog chronology
Big Love (2020)	Random Person (2023)

Random Person is the second studio album by Burner Herzog, the recording project of American musician Jasper Leach. Take a Turn Records released it on October 6, 2023. The album was produced, engineered, and mixed by Martin Bisi at his BC Studio in Gowanus, Brooklyn, and mastered by Jack Shirley at Atomic Garden East in Oakland, California.

== Background and recording ==
Random Person is the first Burner Herzog release recorded after Leach's relocation from the San Francisco Bay Area to New York City. In interviews, Leach has cited the geography of his new home, including Prospect Park, the Maspeth UPS depot, and East Williamsburg, as inspiration for the album's lyrics. Leach also referenced G. I. Gurdjieff's Beelzebub's Tales to His Grandson as a thematic influence on the album.

Recording took place at BC Studio in Gowanus between November 2021 and April 2022 with producer Martin Bisi, known for his work with Sonic Youth, Swans, and John Zorn. The album features guest contributions from trombonist Peter Zummo on the track "Bliss of Love," as well as backing vocals from Alison Niedbalski. Cover photography is by Samantha Veneros, with cover design by Loren Crosier.

== Reception ==
In a long-form essay for RIFF Magazine's "Professor Music" column, critic David Gill described the album as "lonesome jukebox rock and roll" and characterized it as the work that "got me through some rough months" in 2023. Gill singled out the pedal steel guitar on "Memo to Persephone" and described "Metric Halo" as the album's "grunge epic." New Noise Magazine premiered the music video for "Metric Halo" in September 2023, calling Random Person "the best work of Leach to date."

== Tour ==
Burner Herzog supported the album's release with the project's first viable touring run, an October 2023 East Coast run with dates at Gold Sounds in Brooklyn, O'Brien's in Boston, Launderette in Philadelphia, and Prime Location in Kingston, New York.

== Track listing ==
All tracks written by Jasper Leach (as Burner Herzog), except where noted.

No.	Title	Writer(s)	Length
1.	"Lucky Girl"		2:54
2.	"Sometimes It's Hard to Break Free"		3:28
3.	"Nobody Sees Me Like You Do"	Yoko Ono	3:32
4.	"The Pure of Heart (Are the First to Go)"		3:47
5.	"Memo to Persephone"		4:11
6.	"I Wanna Make You Happy"		2:43
7.	"Patient Zero"		3:35
8.	"Random Person"	Nick Freundlich, Burner Herzog, Michael Vattuone, and Sam Weiss	4:39
9.	"Bliss of Love"		5:11
10.	"(Somewhere Inside A) Metric Halo"		3:28

== Personnel ==
Credits adapted from the album's Bandcamp release page.

- Jasper Leach – songwriting, vocals, multiple instruments
- Nick Freundlich – bass, backing vocals
- Sam Weiss – lead guitar, acoustic, backing vocals
- Michael Vattuone – drums, percussion, synth, backing vocals
- Alison Niedbalski – synth, piano, backing vocals
- Martin Bisi – producer, engineer, mixing
- Jack Shirley – mastering (at Atomic Garden East, Oakland)
- Peter Zummo – trombone (on "Bliss of Love")
- Samantha Veneros – cover photography
- Loren Crosier – cover design
