= Whenever You're Ready (album) =

Studio album by Flop
- Released: 21 September 1993
- Studios: Hanzsek Audio, Seattle, Washington
- Genres: Power pop; punk rock
- Length: 44:32
- Labels: 550 Music; Epic; Frontier
- Producer: Martin Rushent

Flop chronology
Flop and the Fall of the Mopsqueezer! (1992)	Whenever You're Ready (1993)	World of Today (1995)

Singles from Whenever You're Ready
- 1. "Regrets" Released: 1993; 2. "The Great Valediction" Released: 1994

Whenever You're Ready is the second studio album by Seattle rock band Flop. The band's only major label release, the album was released in September 1993.

== Recording ==
Whenever You're Ready was recorded at Hanzsek Audio in Seattle, Washington. The record was produced by punk-era producer Martin Rushent.

== Release ==
Whenever You're Ready was released on 21 September 1993. The record was issued in Europe on CD by 550 Music, in Japan through Epic, and in the United States by 550, Epic and Frontier Records jointly. On cassette, the album saw release in the US through 550. Whenever You're Ready was made available digitally in 2019.

== Musical style ==
The music of Whenever You're Ready has been described as "idiosyncratic power pop that paired soaring, Beach Boy harmonies and fuzzy guitars".

== Commercial performance ==
Whenever You're Ready was apparently deemed a commercial failure by Sony, with the record failing to chart. Nevertheless, J.D. Considine of the Baltimore Sun remarked that the band were "doing pretty well" with the record, having attracted college radio airplay and even making an appearance on MTV's "120 Minutes".

== Allusions ==
A demo version of the album track "Julie Francavilla" appeared in the 1996 documentary Hype!, and was included on Hype! The Motion Picture Soundtrack.

== Track listing ==
All tracks are written by Rusty Willoughby, except where noted

No.	Title	Writer(s)	Length
1.	"A. Wylie"		2:30
2.	"Regrets"		3:14
3.	"Julie Francavilla"		2:09
4.	"Pluto"		3:03
5.	"En Route to the Unified Field Theory"		4:20
6.	"A Fixed Point"		2:58
7.	"A Popular Donkey"	Nate Johnson	0:22
8.	"The Great Valediction"		1:51
9.	"Mendel's White Trash Laboratory"		2:31
10.	"Z² + C"		1:50
11.	"Sorry Henry Maartens"		2:41
12.	"Night of the Hunter"		1:45
13.	"Port Angeles"		2:34
14.	"Eat"		2:04
15.	"Woolworth"		2:38
16.	"Pts. 1 & 2"		4:07
17.	"Need Retrograde Orbit"		3:55

== Personnel ==
Flop

- Rusty Willoughby - vocals, guitar
- Bill Campbell - guitar
- Paul Schurr - bass, background vocals
- Nate Johnson - drums

Additional musicians

- Kim "Car Crash" Carter - cello
