= Burner Herzog =

American indie rock project of Jasper Leach

- Origin: Oakland, California, U.S.
- Genres: Indie rock, psychedelic rock, psychedelic pop, power pop
- Years active: 2015–present
- Labels: Paisley Shirt Records, Death Records, Take A Turn Records

Burner Herzog is the recording project of American musician Jasper Leach, based in Oakland, California and later New York City.

== History ==
Leach launched Burner Herzog as a solo pop project in early 2016, following his work as the frontman of Bay Area bands The Myonics and Brasil. The project's debut single, "Dark Places," premiered in Impose Magazine's "Week in Pop" column, and was simultaneously announced by The Bay Bridged.

In September 2017, Burner Herzog released the mini-album Wonderful American on the Oakland-based cassette label Death Records. The Bay Bridged described the release as a continuation of the songwriting approach Leach had explored on the "Dark Places" single.

Burner Herzog's first full-length album, Big Love, was released on July 24, 2020, by San Francisco–based Paisley Shirt Records (catalog number PSR-32) on cassette and compact disc. The album was co-produced by Paul Korte and Chris Daddio across six Bay Area studios, and includes a cover of Silver Apples' "You and I." It received a full review in RIFF Magazine and was featured by Austin Town Hall, and Leach gave a release-cycle interview to The Family Reviews.

After relocating from Oakland to Queens, Leach recorded Burner Herzog's second full-length album, Random Person, with producer Martin Bisi at BC Studio in Brooklyn. Random Person was released on October 6, 2023, by Take A Turn Records. Writing for RIFF Magazine, critic David Gill called Random Person "the album that saved me," discussing the album's songwriting, production, and Burner Herzog's broader discography. A music video for the single "Metric Halo" premiered through New Noise Magazine that September. Leach was also interviewed about the project by UK outlet Music Love Music.

== Personnel ==
Burner Herzog is primarily a vehicle for Leach's songwriting and lead vocals, with a rotating cast of collaborators across releases. Recurring collaborators on the project's recordings have included Paul Korte (producer on Wonderful American and Big Love), Alison Niedblaski, Chris Daddio, Will Kreppel, and Brian Davy.

The present lineup of the band is Kyle Carlson (guitar), Nick Freundlich (bass), Oliver O'Haver (guitar), and Michael Vattuone (drums).

== Discography ==
=== Studio albums ===
- Big Love (2020, Paisley Shirt Records, PSR-32)
- Random Person (2023, Take a Turn Records)

=== Mini-albums and EPs ===
- Wonderful American (2017, Death Records)

=== Singles ===
- "Dark Places" (2016)
- "Metric Halo" (2023)
