= How I Learned to Write Backwards =

- One version of the cover that features several full buildings; the other version has a closeup on a few buildings

Studio album by The Aislers Set
- Released: February 18, 2003
- Recorded: 2002
- Studio: Amy's Garage, San Francisco, California, US
- Genre: Indie pop
- Length: 30:10
- Language: English
- Label: Slumberland Records/Suicide Squeeze Records

The Aislers Set chronology
The Last Match (2000)	How I Learned to Write Backwards (2003)

How I Learned to Write Backwards is the third full-length studio album by American indie pop band The Aislers Set, released in 2003. It has received positive reviews from critics.

== Reception ==
Editors at AllMusic rated this album 4.5 out of 5 stars, with critic Fred Thomas writing that How I Learned to Write Backwards is the "brightest album from San Francisco retro-minded indie pop sweethearts the Aislers Set", which continues to draw on primary songwriter Amy Linton's 1960s pop inspirations while adding "looming paranoia and youthful lightheartedness" that he compares to Laura Nyro and Judee Sill that makes "a masterwork in an unflinchingly great catalog, easily their most comprehensive statement and full of a foggy kind of bliss that no other band after them ever quite replicated". At Exclaim!, Cam Lindsey reviewed all three of the band's full-length studio albums upon their 2014 rerelease, scoring them a 9 out of 10, stating that this album recalls several 1960s girl groups mixed with "sadness", "dour minimalism", and "thrashing noise pop" that results in emotional catharsis. Editors at Pitchfork scored this release 8.0 out of 10 and critic Jason Heller called this release songwriter Amy Linton's most assured, and her self-observational lyrics about pensive days and sleepless nights circumvent the band's carefully constructed cuteness and slip straight into the heart" with a mix of uplifting sounds and "a deflated ennui". Writing for PopMatters in 2014, Zachary Houle rated this album a 7 out of 10, called the music "arguably the band’s darkest hour, [but] still affirming and affecting, the final piece in a wonderful trilogy of albums". Jim Glauner wrote an overview of the band for Trouser Press where he called How I Learned to Write Backwards "for the most part excellent" with lyrics that "exude a newfound subtle confidence".

== Track listing ==
All songs written by Amy Linton, except where noted.

1. "Catherine Says" – 2:29
2. "Emotional Levy" – 3:04
3. "Languor in the Balcony" – 1:58
4. "Mission Bells" – 4:01
5. "Sara's Song" – 2:50
6. "Attraction Action Reaction" – 3:41
7. "Through the Swells" – 2:09
8. "The Train #1" – 1:34
9. "The Train #2" – 1:04
10. "Unfinished Paintings" – 4:00
11. "Melody Not Malaise" – 3:25

== Personnel ==
The Aislers Set

- Jen Cohen
- Wyatt Cusick
- Amy Linton
- Yoshi Nakamoto
- Alicia Vanden Heuvel

Adjunct members

- Stormy Knight
- Dan Lee
- Gary Olson

Additional personnel

- Alan Douches – audio mastering at West West Side Music
- Sara Jaffe
- Dallas Kavanaugh
- Record Technology Incorporated – 8917 – audio mastering
- Jon Reuter

Re-release credits

- John Greenham – remastering at Infrasonic Sound in Los Angeles, California
- Kenji Kitahama – resequencing
- Amy Linton – resequencing

== See also ==
- List of 2003 albums
