= R.E. Seraphin =

American indie rock musician

- Born: Ray Seraphin
- Origin: Vallejo, California, U.S.
- Genres: Indie rock, power pop, jangle pop
- Years active: 2008–present
- Labels: Mt. St. Mtn., Paisley Shirt Records, Take A Turn Records, Safe Suburban Home Records
- Website: reseraphin.com

Ray Seraphin, who records as R.E. Seraphin, is an American indie rock singer, guitarist, and songwriter based in Vallejo, California. A veteran of the San Francisco Bay Area and Austin, Texas underground rock scenes, he previously fronted the power-pop band Talkies before beginning his solo career in 2020.

== Discography ==
=== Albums ===
- Tiny Shapes (2020, Paisley Shirt Records / Mt. St. Mtn.)
- Fool's Mate (2024, Take A Turn Records / Safe Suburban Home Records)
