= Terrible Things Happen =

Studio album by the Aislers Set
- Released: July 31, 1998
- Studio: Amy's Garage, San Francisco, California, US
- Genre: Indie pop
- Length: 44:54
- Language: English
- Label: Slumberland
- Producer: Amy Linton

The Aislers Set chronology
Terrible Things Happen (1998)	The Last Match (2000)

Terrible Things Happen is the debut album by American indie pop band the Aislers Set, released by Slumberland Records in 1998. It has received positive reviews from critics.

== Reception ==
Editors at AllMusic rated this album 4 out of 5 stars, with critic Fred Thomas writing that "Terrible Things Happen finds the band still in a very fresh, embryonic state" that shows songwriter Amy Linton's 1960s musical influences that makes "a strong collection... gathering together the raw materials of Linton's knack for homespun production, heartbreaking melodies, and unexpected songwriting twists that would just get stronger and stronger as the band marched on". At Exclaim!, Cam Lindsey reviewed all three of the band's full-length studio albums upon their 2014 rerelease, scoring them a 9 out of 10, stating that this album includes many pop styles from the 1960s and "the nosier side of C86", resulting in "a template for a whole new generation to ape a decade later". Editors at Pitchfork scored this release 7.8 out of 10 and critic Jason Heller called this release "a sea change" that marked Linton's songwriting from the more punk-influenced work in Henry's Dress with "layered harmonies, dynamic shifts between distorted riffs and acoustic strumming, adventurous arrangements, and dreamy, chanson ambience straight out of a David Lynch roadhouse". Writing for PopMatters in 2014, John L. Murphy rated the band's first two albums a 7 out of 10, alongside the band's 2000 effort The Last Match and called the music on this debut album "a fresh template" that includes several influences that previous critics have heard in the band's music and continued that "updating the sounds of the past, post-punk and girl-group, on this reissue, these songs remain some of Linton’s best". Jim Glauner wrote an overview of the band for Trouser Press where he called Terrible Things Happen a document of Linton's signature sound among a muddy mix and he praised her vocals and musicianship.

== Track listing ==
All songs written by Amy Linton, except where noted.

1. "Friends of the Heroes" – 3:27
2. "California" – 3:13
3. "Holiday Gone Well" – 3:25
4. "Alicia's Song" – 4:28
5. "I've Been Mistreated" – 2:29
6. "Mary's Song" – 5:17
7. "Why Baby" (Wyatt Cusick) – 1:54
8. "Long Division" – 2:33
9. "London Madrid" – 3:38
10. "Cocksure Whistler" – 2:22
11. "Army Street" – 3:24
12. "Falling Buildings" – 2:44
13. "Jaime's Song" – 4:02
14. "My Boyfriend (Could Be a Spanish Man)" – 1:57

== Personnel ==
The Aisler Set

- Wyatt Cusick – guitar on "Mary's Song", "Why Baby", "Long Division", and "Falling Buildings"
- Amy Linton – guitar, instrumentation, vocals, production, artwork
- Yoshi Nakamoto – drums on "Mary's Song", "Why Baby", "Long Division", and "Falling Buildings"
- Alicia Vanden Heuvel – bass guitar on "Mary's Song", "Why Baby", "Long Division", and "Falling Buildings"

Additional personnel

- George Horn – audio mastering at Fantasy Studios
- Chris Daddio – mixing to digital audio tape on "I've Been Mistreated" and "My Boyfriend (Could Be a Spanish Man)"
- Jamie McCormick – audio engineering on "I've Been Mistreated" and "My Boyfriend (Could Be a Spanish Man)"
- Mike Schulman – layout

== See also ==
- List of 1998 albums
