= Fastbacks =

Pop punk band from Seattle

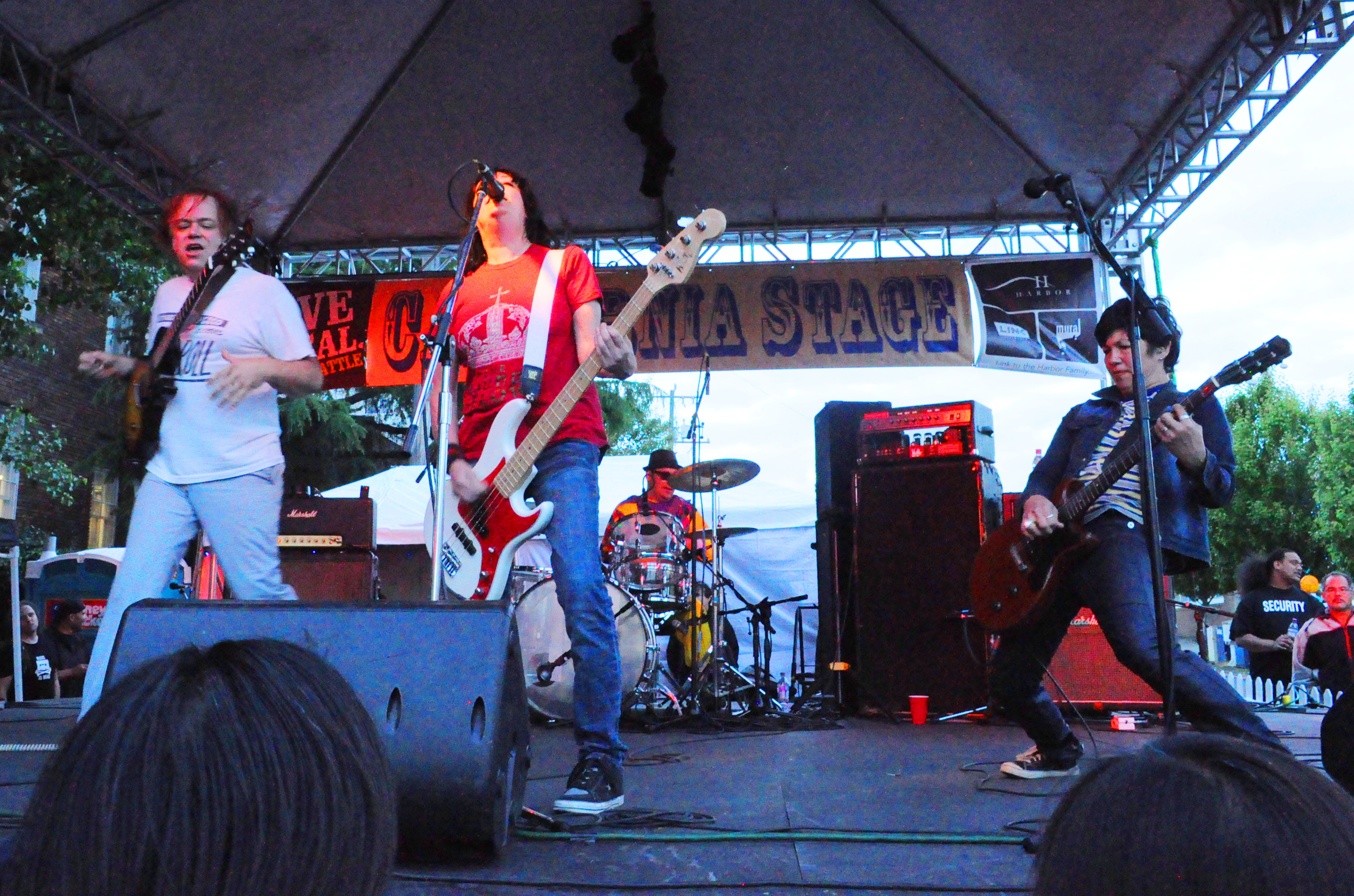
- The Fastbacks at a 2011 reunion gig. Left to right: Kurt Bloch, Kim Warnick, Mike Musburger (rear), Lulu Gargiulo

Background information
- Origin: Seattle, Washington, U.S.
- Genres: Pop punk
- Years active: 1979–2002; 2011; 2018
- Labels: Sub Pop, PopLlama
- Past members: Kurt Bloch; Lulu Gargiulo; Kim Warnick; Duff McKagan; Mike Musburger; Richard Stuverud; Nate Johnson; Rusty Willoughby

Fastbacks are a Seattle, Washington, punk rock band. Formed in 1979 by songwriter/guitarist Kurt Bloch (born August 28, 1960), and friends Lulu Gargiulo (guitar and vocals, born October 12, 1960) and Kim Warnick (bass and vocals, born April 7, 1959), they disbanded in 2001 but have reunited multiple times. Their sound mixes a generally punk rock approach to vocals and sound textures with poppy tunes and strong musicianship.

Although these three band members have remained fairly constant, they have gone through numerous drummers, including Duff McKagan, later of Guns N' Roses. MTV's web page on the Fastbacks says that estimates at the number of Fastbacks drummers "range from 12 to 20." For much of the band's heyday, Mike Musburger filled this role, but other Fastbacks drummers before him (or when he took occasional breaks) included Bloch himself, Richard Stuverud (perhaps best known from War Babies, Fifth Angel and his collaborations with Pearl Jam's Jeff Ament, including Three Fish, Tres Mts. and RNDM), Nate Johnson and Rusty Willoughby (both of whom also played in both Flop and Pure Joy), John Moen (of the Dharma Bums, later of Steven Malkmus's Jicks and The Decemberists), Jason Finn (of the Presidents of the United States of America), Dan Peters of Mudhoney, and Tad Hutchison of the Young Fresh Fellows. Several of these people also served at times as drummers in The Squirrels, a similarly long-lived band, and the Fastbacks' sometime label-mates on PopLlama Records, who bring a similar mix of strong musicianship and punk attitude to even poppier material.

Contributing to the band's 2001 breakup was Kim Warnick's move to the band Visqueen in 2001 through 2004. In summer 2010 Kim Warnick started a new band with Mikey Davis (Alien Crime Syndicate, Tommy Stinson) called Cali Giraffes.

The Fastbacks reunited for a one-off live performance 8 July 2011 at the West Seattle Summer Music Festival, featuring the core trio of Bloch, Warnick, and Garguilo, along with Mike Musburger on drums, their first official show together since their 2001 breakup.

They later reunited in September 2018 for a benefit concert, in aid of fellow Seattle musician Andrew McKeag.

Following a series of archival releases, the Fastbacks released the new single "A Quiet Night" in February, 2023.

== Discography ==
=== Albums ===
- 1987: ...And His Orchestra (PopLlama)
- 1990: Very, Very Powerful Motor (PopLlama)
- 1991: Never Fails, Never Works (Blaster!) - UK compilation of EPs
- 1992: The Question is No (Sub Pop) - compilation
- 1993: Zücker (Sub Pop)
- 1994: Answer the Phone, Dummy (Sub Pop)
- 1996: New Mansions in Sound (Sub Pop)
- 1999: The Day that didn't Exist (spinART)
- 2024: For WHAT Reason! (No Threes)

=== Compilations ===
- 2016: Now is the Time (No Threes) compilation
- 2018: If You Want To Slow Down, Step On The Gas (Bandcamp) - compilation recorded between 1985 and 1990
- 2020: Zucker 2020 (Bandcamp) - expanded and remixed version of 1993 album

=== Singles ===
- 1981: "It's Your Birthday" / "You Can't Be Happy" (No Threes)
- 1989: "Wrong Wrong Wrong" / "In America" - (Subway) - UK
- 1989: "In The Winter" / "It Came To Me In A Dream" (Subway) - UK
- 1990: "Lose" (Steve Priest Fan Club) - split with Gas Huffer
- 1991: The Answer Is You ("My Letters"/"Whatever Happened to ?"/"Impatience"/"Above the Sunrise") (Sub Pop) 2-single set
- 1992: "Run No More" / "Really" (Who Cares?)
- 1992: "Now Is the Time" / "Sometimes" / "Was Late" (Ded Beet)
- 1993: "They Don't Care" / "Out of the Charts" - (PopLlama)
- 1993: "Gone to the Moon" - "Go All the Way" (Sub Pop)
- 1994: "Wait It Out" / "The Jester" (Munster)
- 1995: Rat Race / I Live In A Car / Telephone Numbers (Gearhead Records) - Split with The Meices
- 1996: Just Say (Sub Pop)
- 1996: All In Order / Answer The Phone, Dummy / Allison (Birdtime Bird Co.)
- 1996: And After All / Marionette (Birdtime Bird Co.)
- 2011: Come On Come On / I Can't Hide (Super Fan)
- 2023: A Quiet Night / Outer Space (No Threes)

=== EPs ===
- 1982: Fastbacks Play Five of Their Favorites (No Threes)
- 1984: Everyday Is Saturday (No Threes)
- 1989: "In The Summer/You Can't Be Happy/Everything I Don't Need/Queen of Eyes" (No Threes/SPFC)
- 1993: Gone To The Moon (Sub Pop)
- 1996: Alone In A Furniture Warehouse Scaring You Away Like A Hotel Mattress (Munster) - Spain
- 1998: Win Lose or Both (PopLlama)

=== Contributed tracks to ===
- 1981: Seattle Syndrome Volume One (Engram) track 6, "Someone Else's Room"
- 1986: Let's Sea (K Records) track A-4, "Don't Eat That, It's Poison"
- 1986: Monkey Business: Green Monkey Records 1986 Compilation (Green Monkey) track 8, "Time Passes"
- 1988: Sub Pop 200 (Sub Pop) track 10, "Swallow My Pride" (Green River cover)
- 1991: Another Damned Seattle Compilation (Dashboard Hula Girl) track 18, "Hit or Miss" (The Damned cover)
- 1992: on International Pop Underground Convention (K Records) track 19, "Impatience" (live)
- 1992: International Pop Underground Convention' (K Records) track 19, "Impatience"
- 1992: Hodge Podge & Barrage from Japan (1 + 2 Records) track 9, "Trouble Sleeping"
- 1992: Estrus Gearbox (Estrus) track 2, "Hot Rods To Heaven"
- 1992: 20 More Explosive Fantastic Rockin' Mega Smash Hit Explosions! (Pravda) track 2-6 "Rocket Man"
- 1993: ...And The Fun Just Never Ends (Lost And Found) track 8, "You Can't Be Happy"; track 8, "Love You More" - Germany
- 1993: Say Hello To The Far East (Sony Records) track 1, "Go All The Way"
- 1994: 13 Soda Punx (Munster / Top Drawer) track 5, " I'm Cold"
- 1994: "Whole Wide World" - The Subway Organisation Label 1986-1990 (Midi Inc.) track 14, "In The Winter"
- 1994: The World of The Zombies (PopLlama) track 6, "Hung Up On A Dream"; track 9, "Just Out Of Reach"
- 1995: 20 Supersonic Mega Explosive Hits (Runt) track 19, "Rocket Man" - Italy
- 1995: Oh Canaduh! (A Collection of Canadian Punk Rock Covers) (Lance Rock) track 8, "Won't Have To Worry"
- 1995: Screaming Life (Sub Pop) track 9, "What's It Like" - included with the book Screaming Life: A Chronicle of the Seattle Music Scene (HarperCollins)
- 1996: Bite Back / Live at the Crocodile Cafe's (PopLlama) track 5, "Always Tomorrow"
- 1996: Home Alive - The Art of Self Defense (Epic) track 1-3, "Time & Matter"
- 1996: Hype! The Motion Picture Soundtrack (Sub Pop) track 1, "K Street" (Live); track 22, "Just Say"
- 1996: Paydirt (Sub Pop) track 7, "I Can't Win"; track 17, "No Information"
- 1997: Dictators Forever Forever Dictators Vol. II (Roto) track 16, "Exposed" - Spain
- 2001: Give the People What We Want : The Songs Of The Kinks (Sub Pop / Burn Burn Burn / Right Now) track 12, "Waterloo Sunset"
- 2004: Truth Corrosion and Sour Bisquits (Book Records)
- 2013: What Have We Wrought? A Mike Atta Benefit Compilation (Burger / Gasatanka / Munster) track 1-6, "Fast Enough"

=== Live ===
- 1988: Bike • Toy • Clock • Gift - self-released as a tape in 1988, re-released on No Threes Records in 1989, CD released in 1994 on Lucky Records
- 1991: In America (Smilin' Ear) (2×7")
- 1996: Here They Are... Live At the Crocodile... (Lance Rock) - Canada
- 2021: Mural Amphitheater, Seattle, WA August 25, 1986 (Bandcamp) - archival live recording

=== Video ===
- 2004: Hype! The Sound of a Musical Explosion DVD (Republic)
