= Cold Sun =

Texan psychedelic rock band

Cold Sun was an Austin, Texas psychedelic rock group most active from 1968-1973, founded by Billy Miller and Tom McGarrigle. Their one album, Dark Shadows, was not released until 1989, but was praised by Jello Biafra, who called Dark Shadows “the best psychedelic album I know of,” and Julian Cope, who claimed Miller “invented post-punk in 1970.”

== Name changes ==
According to Miller, the band went through several name changes. They were called Cauldron for “a few weeks” before becoming Amethyst, then The Daily Planet, Dark Shadows, and finally Cold Sun. The band’s name comes from the cold sun paradox. The band was signed to the record label Sonobeat, but their recordings were not released.

The band moved in the same circles as Roky Erickson, and some members of Cold Sun went on the join the Aliens, Erickson’s backing band.

== Release of Dark Shadows ==
Dark Shadows was recorded in 1970, but was not released until 1989 or 1990, and in a pressing of a few hundred copies. The album was reissued in 2008, with the original tracks and two live cuts from 1972. A vinyl pressing was released in 2024.

== Reunion and second album ==
In 2011, the band reunified for the Austin Psych Fest (now the Levitation Festival) with Miller, McGarrigle, and Jasper Leach as music director. Their set was apparently not well-received, with one reviewer describing how the band “emptied the full room down to three-dozen or so curious onlookers.” Cold Sun’s second album, Rites of Osiris, was recorded and produced, but has not been released.
