= Kim Warnick =

American guitarist

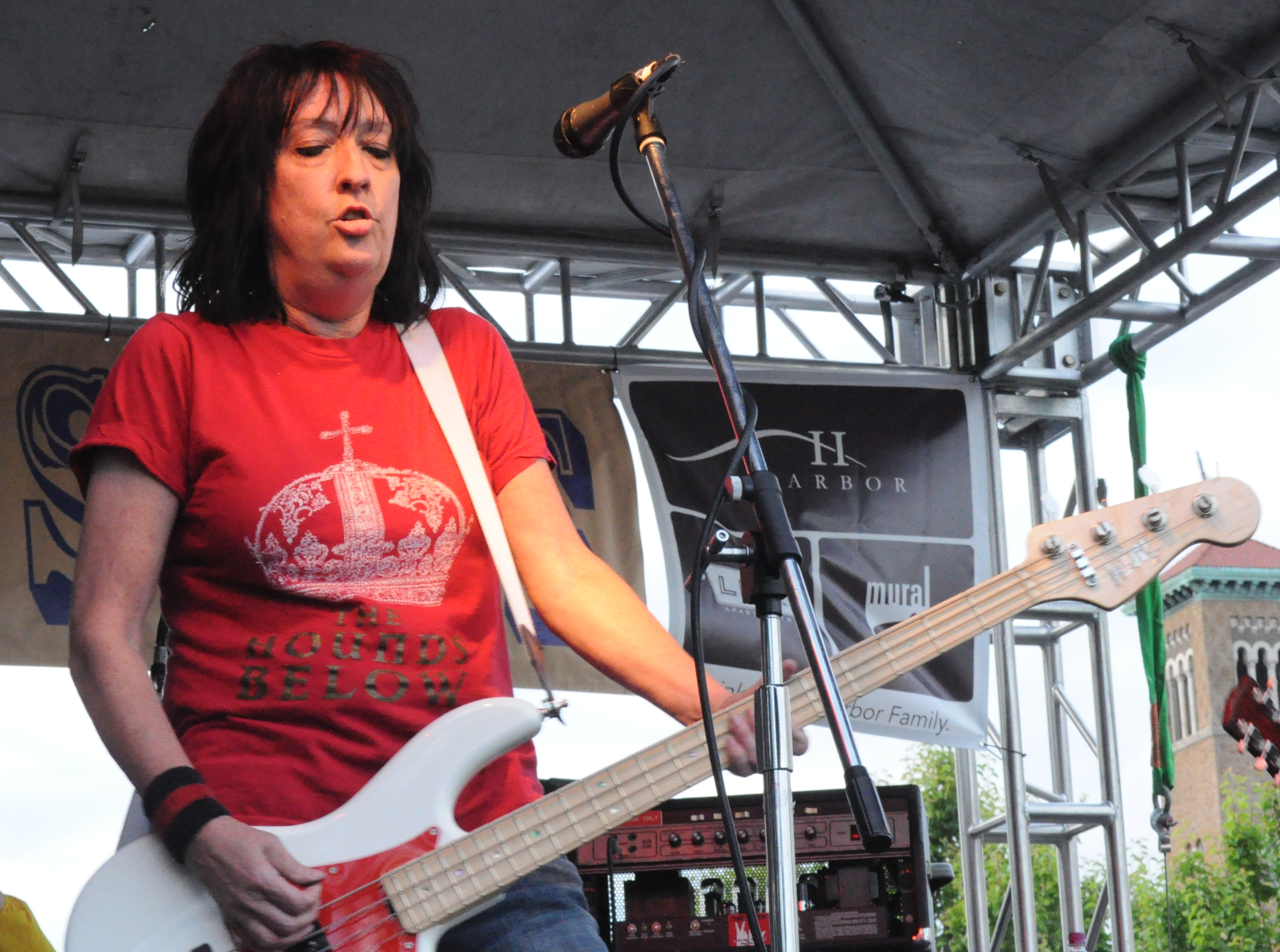
Warnick playing bass guitar in 2011

Kim Warnick (born April 7, 1959) is an American rock musician (bassist and vocalist), a former member of Seattle-based bands The Fastbacks (1979–2002) and Visqueen (1998–2004). Described by KIRO-FM in 2016 as a "legendary musician and vocalist," she is the former wife of Ken Stringfellow of The Posies. Officially she retired in 2004, and suffered some serious health issues in the following years, but recovered and has participated in Fastbacks reunion shows, the first of which was in 2011, headlining the West Seattle Summer Fest.

With the Fastbacks, Warnick opened for Seattle shows by acts such as Joan Jett and The Ramones, toured Japan with Seaweed and the Supersuckers, and supported Pearl Jam on a tour that went as far as Istanbul.

The reunited Fastbacks performed at SPF 30 on August 8, 2018, an outdoor concert celebrating the 30 year anniversary of Sub Pop Records, Warnick's prior employer and the band's label.
