= Dissed and Dismissed =

Studio album by Tony Molina
- Released: February 26, 2013
- Genre: Power pop, indie rock, lo-fi, punk rock
- Length: 11:53
- Label: Melters (2013); Slumberland Records (2014)

Tony Molina chronology
Embarrassing Times (2009)	Dissed and Dismissed (2013)	Six Tracks EP (2013)

Dissed and Dismissed is the second solo album by Bay Area musician Tony Molina, originally self-released on the Melters label in early 2013 in a limited pressing of approximately 500 copies, then reissued by Slumberland Records on March 25, 2014. The album contains 12 songs with a total runtime of under 12 minutes, a structural concision that became central to its critical reception and Molina's reputation as a songwriter.

== Background ==
Molina, born and raised in Millbrae, California, had spent the previous decade playing in Bay Area hardcore and punk bands including Dystrophy, Ovens, Lifetime Problems, Caged Animal, and Violent Change before recording Dissed and Dismissed as a solo project. Music critic Sam Lefebvre, writing for the East Bay Express, described the album as distilling "the slacker clichés and self-deprecation of 90s indie rock into absurdist hyperbole," noting that Molina "appropriates unapologetically" from touchstones including Thin Lizzy, Radiohead, and The Replacements, "but distills the past into bursts of reverence less than a minute long." The album's initial pressing sold out rapidly; word of mouth spread sufficiently that Matador Records commissioned the follow-up Six Tracks EP for their Singles Going Home Alone series before Slumberland reissued the album in 2014.

Hannah Lew, the bassist from Grass Widow, directed the music video for "Don't Come Back."

== Critical reception ==
Professional ratings
Aggregate scores
Source	Rating
Metacritic	75
Review scores
Source	Rating
The Line of Best Fit	7/10
Pitchfork	7.5/10
PopMatters	7/10
The Quietus	Positive

The Slumberland reissue received broadly positive reviews from independent music publications. Pitchfork awarded the album a score of 7.5 out of 10. The Quietus published a full review praising the album's economy, writing that it "is basically all gold" and drawing comparisons to Weezer, Teenage Fanclub, Guided by Voices, and Dinosaur Jr. PopMatters scored the album 7 out of 10, describing it as "a fascinating album" that "presents us with both representation and escape." The Line of Best Fit awarded it a score of 7 out of 10, noting it "combines Molina's hardcore background with jangling melody perfectly at times."

== Track listing ==
No.	Title	Length
1.	"Nowhere to Go"	0:48
2.	"Change My Ways"	1:12
3.	"Can't Believe"	1:02
4.	"Tear Me Down"	0:43
5.	"Nothing I Can Do"	1:03
6.	"Sick Ass Riff"	0:25
7.	"See Me Through"	0:41
8.	"Don't Come Back"	1:32
9.	"Spoke Too Soon"	0:42
10.	"The Way Things Are"	1:02
11.	"Wondering Boy Poet" (Guided by Voices cover)	0:46
12.	"Walk Away"	1:24
Total length:		11:56
