= Lucky Records =

Lucky Records is the name of several different record labels.

== Lucky Records – Tokyo ==
Lucky Records of the 1930s was a record label based in Tokyo, Japan, which specialized in issuing American popular music to the Japanese audience.

Lucky was founded in November 1934 by the Lucky Record Co. Tokyo, owned by the Saito Shoten cotton importing business. It made arrangements with the American Record Corporation to issue material from ARC labels in Japan. Its most successful imports were the recordings of Bing Crosby. Many of the other Lucky Records issues are surprisingly eclectic, including recordings by Eddie Condon, Red Allen, Cab Calloway and Duke Ellington, but also rural southern blues records otherwise unissued outside of the United States in the era (and in the US mostly restricted to labels catering to the African American market). Lucky issues also included accordion bands, Hawaiian music, calypso music and Argentine tangos. It is unclear if this material was specifically selected, or if some was simply chosen at random by someone at either Lucky or ARC.

== Lucky Records – Los Angeles ==
Lucky Records of the 1950s was a Los Angeles–based label run by John Dolphin.

== Lucky Records – Bootlegs ==
Lucky Records of the 1960s and 1970s was a bootleg label, issuing recordings of live performances of noted rock & roll artists (including Elvis Presley and Bob Dylan) on vinyl records.

== Lucky Records – Seattle ==
Lucky Records of the 1990s, described by one website as "Canadian surf and rock'n'roll", is based in Seattle, Washington, US.

== See also ==
- List of record labels
