= Jasper Leach =

American musician, recording engineer, and writer

- Born: 1986 (age 39–40)
- Origin: Los Angeles, California
- Genres: psychedelic rock; indie rock; experimental music
- Years active: 2008 - present
- Labels: Death Records, Mt. Kagorama
- Formerly of: Brasil; The Myonics
- Website: Instagram

Jasper Patrick Leach (born c. 1986) is an American musician, recording engineer, and music journalist based in New York City. He is the frontman of the psychedelic rock group Burner Herzog and previously led the Oakland indie rock band Brasil (2012-circa 2016) and the San Francisco psychedelic collective The Myonics (2006–2012). He was also the musical director for the reunion of Cold Sun at 2011’s Austin Psych Fest.

As a journalist, Leach contributed an oral history of the Athens, Georgia rock band Harvey Milk to Maggot Brain Issue 17 (2024), published by Third Man Records. He contributed a feature essay on Mayo Thompson's album Corky's Debt to His Father to Maggot Brain Issue 18 (2024), which editor Mike McGonigal described as "a stunningly good and very deep dive." In 2016, he co-authored an academic article on the same album for Southwestern American Literature.

He has production and engineering credits on releases for Slumberland Records and Castle Face Records, including Tony Molina's Kill the Lights (Slumberland, 2018), for which Molina named the track "Jasper's Theme" in his honor.

== Musical career ==
=== The Myonics ===
Leach founded The Myonics as a solo project in 2006, gradually expanding the group through several lineups, including one with Bill Miller from Cold Sun, before its dissolution in 2012. The San Francisco Bay Guardian described their sound as "offensive psych-rock."

The group's studio album Pagans, released on Mt. Kagorama in March 2012, was recorded over a roughly two-year period, mostly at Expression College. Leach cited the length of the recording process as one of the primary reasons he chose to pay for studio time when recording with Brasil. SF Weekly premiered the band's first music video, for "I Don't Give a Fuck About You," and likened the band's sound to Ariel Pink, Guided by Voices, and early Pavement.

=== Brasil ===
Following the dissolution of The Myonics in 2012, Leach formed the Oakland rock band Brasil with guitarist Paul Korte (formerly of The Symbolick Jews), bassist Tom Ferguson, and Myonics drummer Michael Vattuone. The band's self-titled debut, recorded in three days at Tiny Telephone with engineer Jay Pellicci, was self-released in October 2013. The East Bay Express called it "one of 2013's most diverse and rewarding local rock 'n' roll albums."

In April 2014, Brasil recorded a live set of Pavement covers at Awaken Cafe in Oakland and released it digitally as Pavement, acknowledging the comparisons the band had drawn since its formation. A second studio album, At Paradise Park, followed in July 2016 on Grabbing Clouds Records and Tapes and Long Live Death Records. Brasil became inactive around 2016 as Leach shifted his focus to his solo project Burner Herzog.

=== Burner Herzog ===
Leach launched Burner Herzog as a solo pop project in early 2016. As Burner Herzog, Leach released an EP, Wonderful American, and an album, Big Love, before relocating from the Bay Area to Queens, New York. His second album, Random Person, was produced by Martin Bisi.

== Discography ==
=== The Myonics ===
- Digits EP (2010, Self-released)
- Pagans (2012, Mt. Kagorama)

=== Brasil ===
- Brasil (2013, Self-released)
- Pavement (2014, Self-released)
- At Paradise Park (2016, Death Records)

=== Burner Herzog ===
- Wonderful American EP (2017, Death Records)
- Big Love (2020, Paisley Shirt Records)
- Random Person (2023, Take-A-Turn Records)

=== Solo Projects ===
- White Light, White Heat (2012, Self-released) - track-for-track cover of The Velvet Underground's album, White Light/White Heat
