= Aquarius Records (store) =

Independent record store in San Francisco

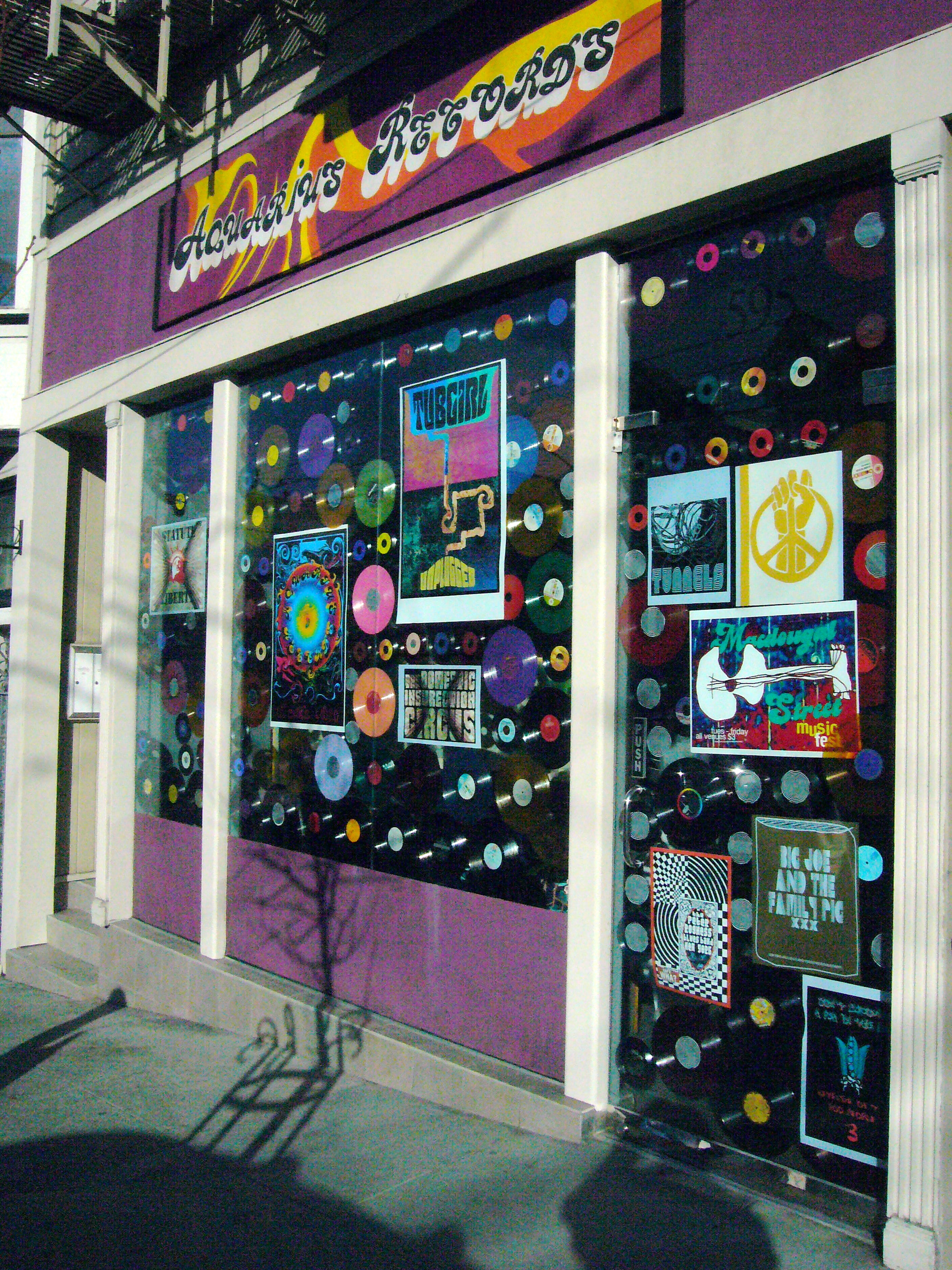
Aquarius Records storefront re-created for Harvey Milk film in 2008

Aquarius Records was an independent record store in San Francisco, California, established in 1970. Aquarius was known for carrying an obscure selection of psychedelia, metal, and world music, and had an extensive mail order catalog. The store's selection was relatively small and was chosen and annotated by the staff of music aficionados. They claimed to have coined the modern alias dronology for the drone music genre. It is the subject of the documentary It Came From Aquarius Records that premiered as part of the 2022 San Francisco Documentary Festival.

== History ==
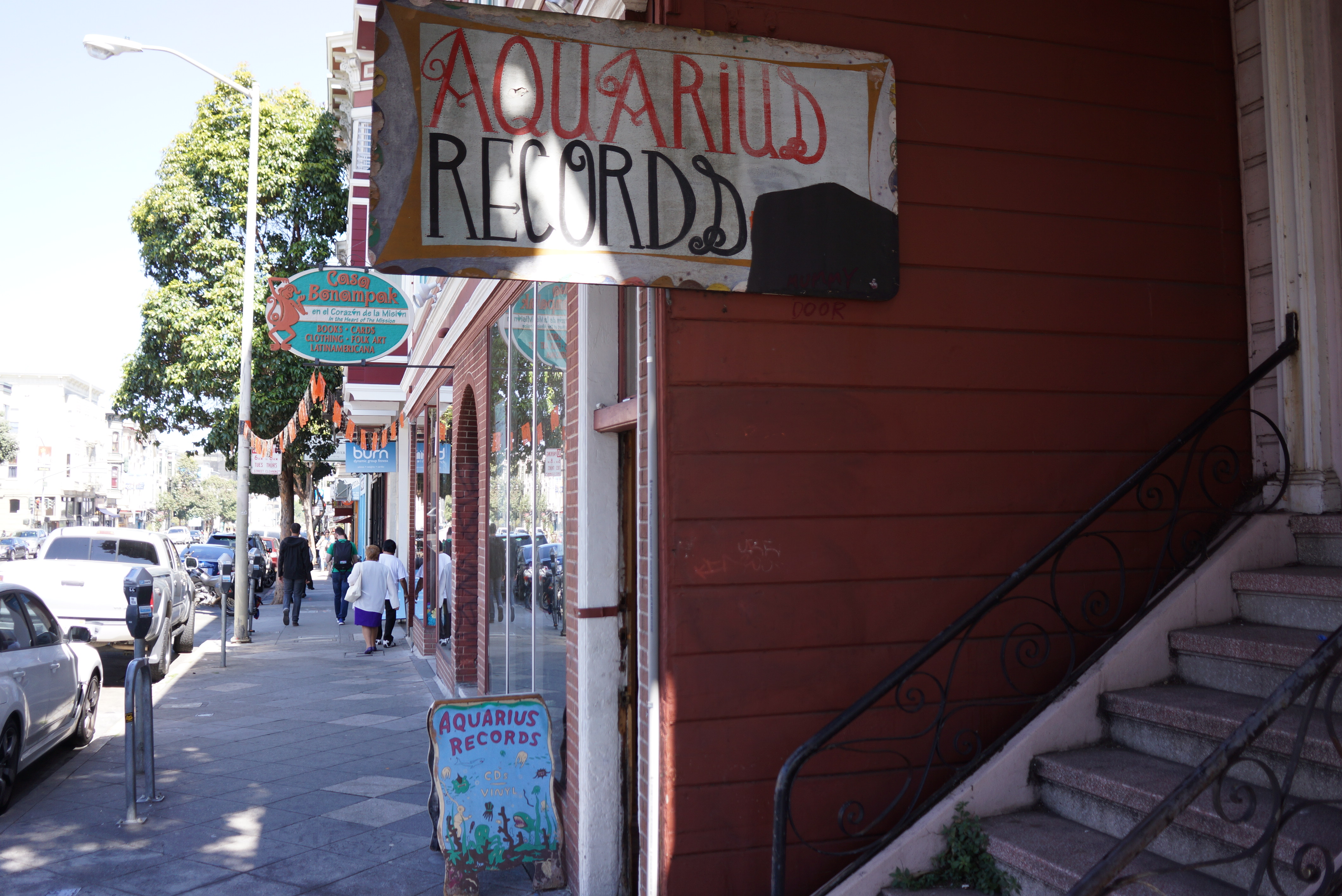
Store on Valencia Street in 2015

The first Aquarius Records store was located in the Castro area of San Francisco. The first store was on 19th Street, followed by two locations on Castro Street, including one next door to Harvey Milk's camera store. Chris Knab bought the store in 1972 and in 1978 he co-founded the independent punk rock and new wave music record label 415 Records with Harvey Milk's friend, and his, Howie Klein. Around 1983, the store moved to 3961 24th Street, in the Noe Valley neighborhood. In 1996, new owner Windy Chien moved the store to 1055 Valencia Street in the Mission District. Aquarius Records closed its doors in 2016.
