= The Aislers Set =

American indie pop band

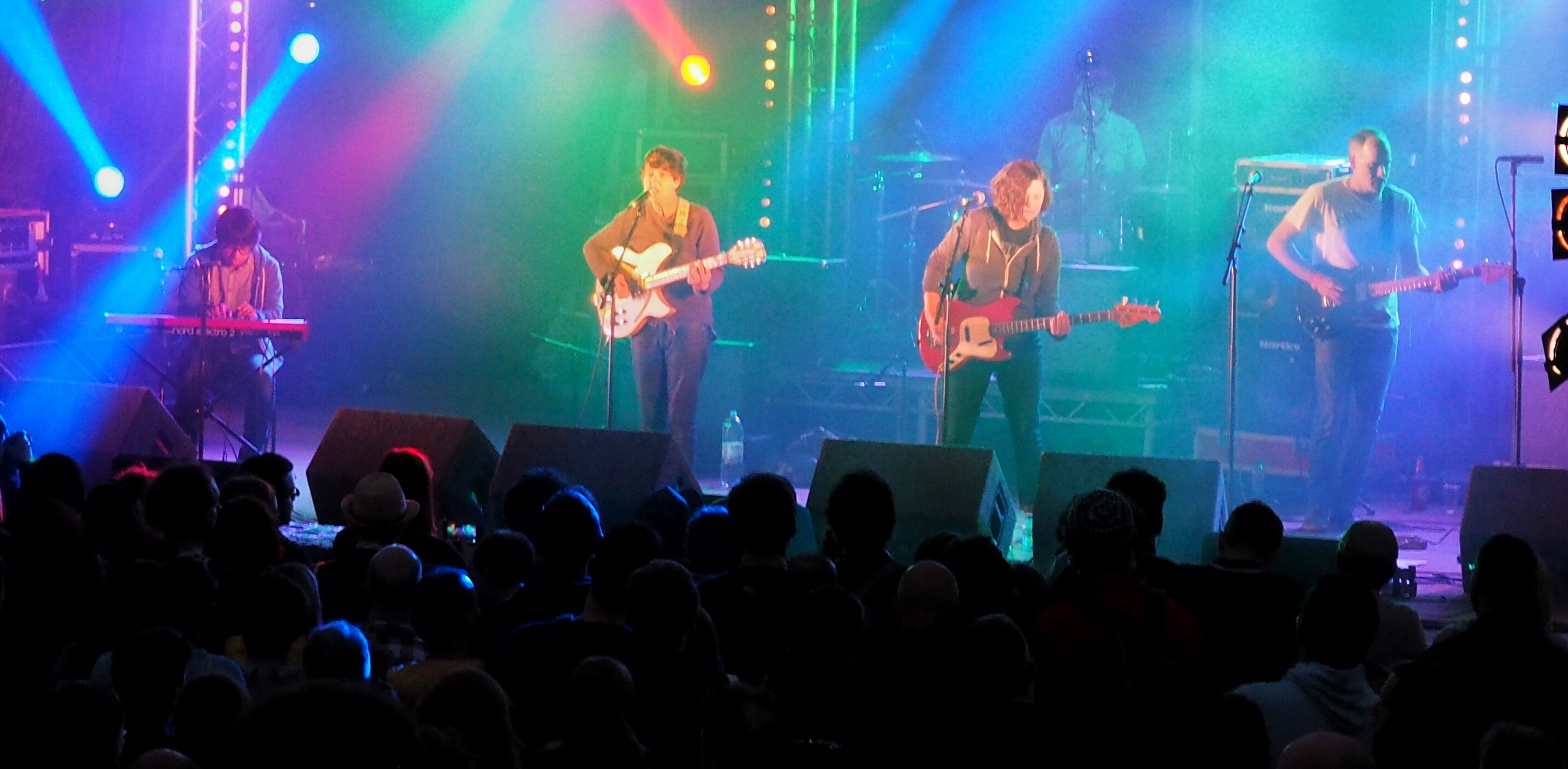
- The Aislers Set at Indietracks in 2016

Background information
- Origin: San Francisco
- Years active: 1997–present
- Labels: Slumberland, Suicide Squeeze
- Members: A. V. Linton; Wyatt Cusick; Yoshi Nakamoto; Alicia Vanden Heuvel; Jen Cohen; Dan Lee
- Website: Official site

The Aislers Set is an American indie pop band that formed in San Francisco in 1997, after the breakup of chief songwriter Amy Linton's (currently goes by AV Linton or just Linton) former band Henry's Dress. The Aislers Set's music is often interpreted as adjacent to C86-style British indie pop. The founding members were AV Linton (guitar, vocals, multi-instrumentalist), Wyatt Cusick (guitar, vocals, multi-instrumentalist), Alicia Vanden Heuvel, (bass, vocals, piano, multi-instrumentalist), Yoshi Nakamoto (drums), and Jen Cohen (organ). The band was primarily active from 1998 to 2003, touring the U.S., Europe, and Japan, releasing three self-recorded albums, numerous singles and even recording a Peel Session in 2001.

== History ==
The first record, Terrible Things Happen (1998), was initially performed and recorded entirely by Linton before meeting who would become the live players and future collaborators in the band. Linton was interested in forming a band to play the songs they had recorded alone, and played the tape for friends Alicia Vanden Heuvel (Poundsign) and Wyatt Cusick (Trackstar), who, after listening to the songs, agreed to play. Cusick and Vanden Heuvel invited their friend Yoshi Nakamoto to these first rehearsals. A band formed and the group re-recorded a couple of songs so that the new members would be represented on the album. Additionally, Cusick wrote one song to contribute to the album. Terrible Things Happen was released in 1998, and the album received glowing reviews in CMJ, The Big Takeover, and numerous indie pop zines, earning enough of a following to generate a tour of Japan in April 1999, with new member, Jen Cohen (Skypark) on keyboards. Terrible Things Happen (as with the rest of the Aislers Set's music) was recorded in Linton's tiny basement studio onto an Otari 1/2" analog tape machine, and cut directly to lathe at Fantasy Studios by mastering engineer George Horn, an entirely analogue process.

Spin.com placed the band's second album The Last Match on its Top 20 of 2000, saying, "Linton has cleared the cobwebs off the Pop conundrum and dolled them up in a perfect dress." On Salon.com, Greil Marcus wrote, "They make dream pop feel as easy to make as a can of soup, and as dangerous: Watch that jagged edge." The album was recorded by the band on Otari 8 track and mixed onto an Otari 1/4" 2 track, again in Linton's basement and Cusick and Vanden Heuvel's home studio. High praise followed in the New York Times, NME, Gear, and Alternative Press, and the band set out on lengthy tours supporting acts such as Sleater Kinney and Bratmobile.

In early 2001, the band set off on a three-week tour of Europe which was highlighted by an invitation to record a session for legendary British DJ John Peel. They recorded four tracks for the show which was aired twice by Peel. He said of the band "If you were in one of your difficult moods you could argue that there are lots of bands making that kind of noise particularly in the United States of America. And you'd say well, why are Aislers Set better than any of the others and I'd have to say, well I don't know they just sort of are..."

In 2002 the band was invited by Belle and Sebastian for a week-long tour of the East Coast, culminating in a show at New York City's Hammerstein Ballroom in front of over 3,000 people. Stevie Jackson of Belle and Sebastian was later quoted in a 2003 SF Weekly article, observing that "[t]hey are one of the best groups in America as far as I'm concerned".

Late in 2002, the San Francisco Chronicle included The Aislers Set in its list of "Young Artists on the Verge", writing, "The Aislers Set's reinvention of '60s pop resurrects walls of garage guitars and rich, Spector-esque sound, insouciance combined with insightful lyrics. But this quintet makes the past feel contemporary, borrowing from punk and pop to create a 21st century cool sound".

In 2002, The Aislers Set had to cancel an entire tour. On the evening before this lengthy tour Linton was hospitalized and unable to walk for many months after. After months of hospital visits and tests the results were inconclusive and could not explain the temporary paralysis or pain Linton suffered during this time.

The Aislers Set's third album, How I Learned to Write Backwards, came out in spring 2003. Some of songs are just Linton experimenting with and getting back to making and recording music after recovering from many stressful months of hospitalisation and insufficient diagnosis. Others were fully fleshed out songs. It was recorded on a 16 track that the band purchased themselves, after expanding the space in Linton's basement studio. NME wrote "Sleighbells, Cuban trumpets, half-inched Smiths lyrics and chasms of lovely echo all add to an insomnia-like reverie that clings on long after its mere half-hour is up." "When The Aislers Set hit their mark, they unveil a knack for tying together extremes without ever settling for the middle ground" said MOJO magazine. Pitchfork Media stated with respect to the 2003 version of The Aislers Set: "Here, Linton's indie quintet becomes a pop orchestra. The band's music is denser than ever before, laden with sleigh bells, handclaps and horns piled atop the conventional guitars, drums, bass and keyboards – and all are drenched in cavernous reverb, providing the ambiance and intimacy of a gigantic, empty concert hall".

The band toured for most of 2003 including a month-long stint supporting Yo La Tengo and a week supporting The Shins.

Since late 2003 the band has been on hiatus with Linton having moved to New York City and Cusick moving to Gothenburg, Sweden.

On Christmas Day 2010, the band made a new song, "Cold Christmas".

In September 2014, the group reunited to play four West Coast shows in celebration of their LP reissues.

== Members ==
- A V Linton – vocals, guitar, bass, drums, keyboards, trumpet
- Wyatt Cusick – guitar, vocals
- Yoshi Nakamoto – drums
- Alicia Vanden Heuvel – bass
- Jen Cohen – organ
- Dan Lee – organ

== Contributing members ==
- Gary Olson/Ladybug Transistor – trumpet
- Kevin Barker/Currituck County – guitar
- Michael O'Neill – bass
- Alan Wiley — tuba/trombone

== Discography ==
- Terrible Things Happen LP/CD (Slumberland Records, September 1998)
- The Last Match LP/CD (Slumberland Records, May 2000)
- How I Learned to Write Backwards LP (Slumberland Records, February 2003), CD (Suicide Squeeze Records)
- "Been Hiding" b/w "Fire Engines" 7-inch (Slumberland Records)
- "The Walk Pt.1" split 7-inch w/ Poundsign (Slumberland Records)
- "Not to Young to Get Married" split 7-inch w/ Poundsign
- "Hey Lover" split 7-inch w/ The How
- "Yeah Yeah" split w/ The Fairways
- "The Snow Don't Fall" one sided 7-inch (Slumberland Records)
- "The Red Door" 7-inch (Slumberland Records)
- " Attraction Action Reaction" 7-inch (Suicide Squeeze Records)
- "Mission Bells" 12-inch (Suicide Squeeze Records)

The Aislers Set's albums were also released in Australia by the Lost & Lonesome Recording Co.; The Last Match was released in the UK by 555 Recordings and Fortuna Pop!.
