= Kurt Bloch =

American musician

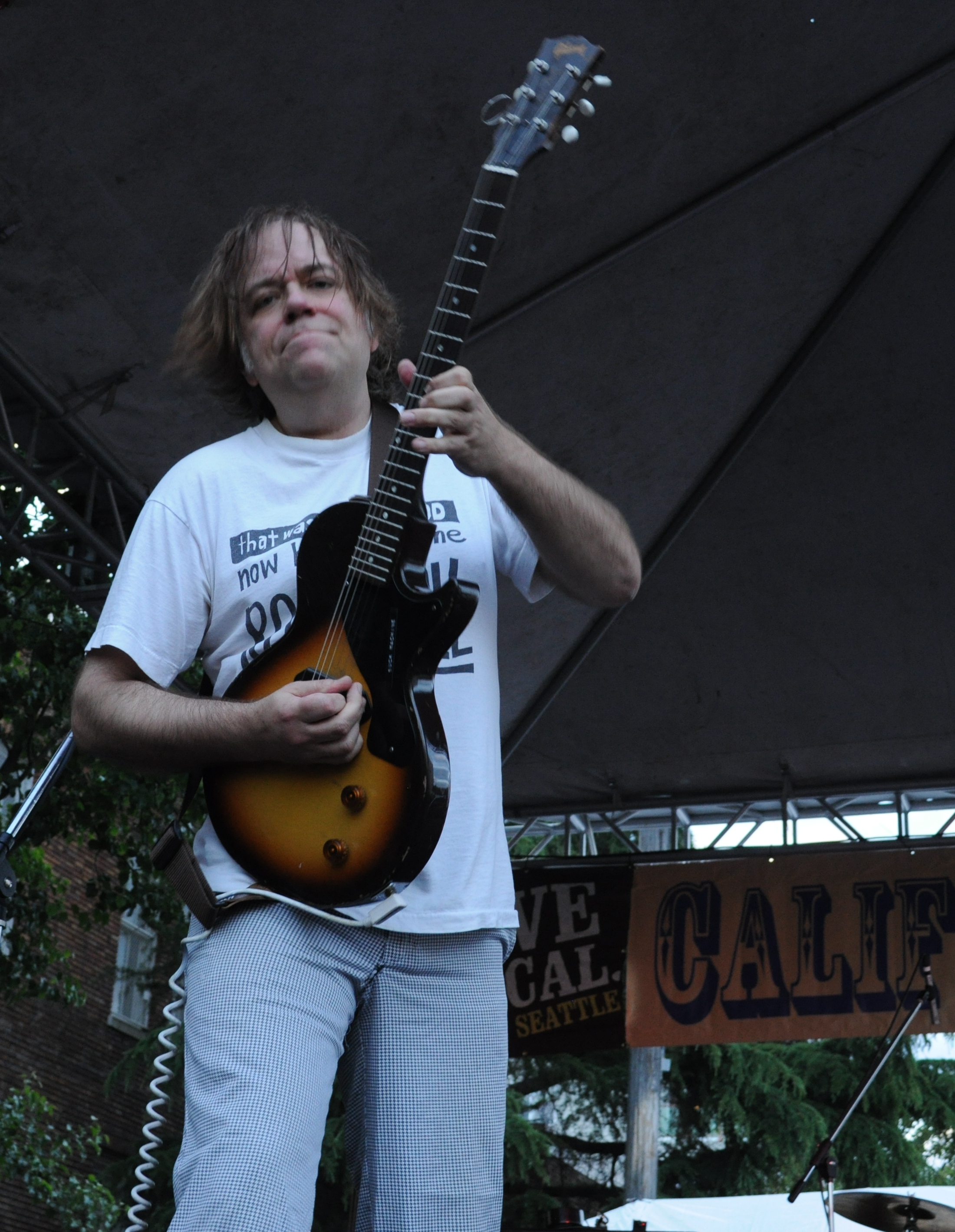
- Bloch with guitar, 2011

Background information
- Born: August 28, 1960 (age 64)
- Genres: Hard rock
- Occupation(s): Musician, Record producer
- Instrument: Guitar

Kurt Bloch (born August 28, 1960) is an American songwriter, guitarist, engineer and record producer.

== Music career ==
Bloch is best known as songwriter and lead guitarist of Fastbacks, and is a member of The Young Fresh Fellows.

=== Record Production ===
Bloch has recorded tracks and produced albums for The Presidents of the United States of America, Tokyo Dragons, Robyn Hitchcock, Les Thugs, Flop, Sicko, The Minus 5, The Venus 3, and more recently the Tall Birds.

Nashville Pussy's song "Fried Chicken and Coffee", produced by Bloch, was nominated for the 1999 Grammy Award for Best Metal Performance.

=== Thee Sgt. Major III ===
He is a member of Thee Sgt. Major III (earlier known as Sgt. Major), along with ex-Posies drummer Mike Musburger, The Young Fresh Fellows bassist Jim Sangster, and Cantona singer and guitarist Leslie Beattie. Bill Coury (ex-Visqueen) previously shared lead vocal duties, but has since left the band.

=== The Beltholes ===
Bloch plays guitar for and produces Seattle-based prog-rock band The Beltholes, who released the 2007 album "For Whom the Beltholes" on the Burn Burn Burn label. The band also includes Kwab Copeland and Fred Speakman (lead vocals), and Anthony Clementi (bass).

=== The Yes Masters ===
2017 saw the release of the self-titled debut by The Yes Masters, featuring Kurt Bloch (lead vocals, electric guitar, production, engineering), Rick Foundation (drums), and Matt Scientist (bass, vocals) on the No Threes label.

=== Filthy Friends ===
Also in 2017, Bloch joined Corin Tucker of Sleater Kinney, Peter Buck of R.E.M., Scott McCaughey and Linda Pitmon to form the band Filthy Friends and release their album Invitation. Bill Rieflin has also been cited as a drummer in the band.

== Discography ==
=== The Beltholes ===
- 2007: For Whom The Beltholes (Burn Burn Burn Records)

=== Fastbacks ===
See Fastbacks discography

=== Sgt. Major ===
- 2004: Rich, Creamery Butter (Book Records BOOK 6)

=== Thee Sgt. Major ===
LP

- 2010: The Idea Factory (Book Records)

Single

- 2009: Ice Cold Ten (Book Records)

=== The Yes Masters ===
- 2017: The Yes Masters (No Threes Records N3-017)

=== The Young Fresh Fellows ===
See The Young Fresh Fellows discography
