= Band Aid (film) =

- Theatrical release poster
- Directed by: Zoe Lister-Jones
- Written by: Zoe Lister-Jones
- Produced by: Natalia Anderson; Zoe Lister-Jones
- Starring: Zoe Lister-Jones; Adam Pally; Fred Armisen; Susie Essman; Retta; Hannah Simone; Ravi Patel; Brooklyn Decker
- Cinematography: Hillary Spera
- Edited by: Libby Cuenin
- Music by: Lucius
- Production companies: Mister Lister Films; QC Entertainment
- Distributed by: IFC Films
- Release dates: January 24, 2017 (Sundance); June 2, 2017 (United States)
- Running time: 91 minutes
- Country: United States
- Language: English
- Box office: $248,370

Band Aid is a 2017 American comedy-drama film, written and directed by Zoe Lister-Jones in her directorial debut. It stars Lister-Jones, Adam Pally, Fred Armisen, Susie Essman, Retta, Hannah Simone, Ravi Patel and Brooklyn Decker. Lister-Jones also co-wrote the original songs in the film with multi-instrumentalist Kyle Forester.

With the exception of actors, the film was produced with an all-female crew. The film had its world premiere at the Sundance Film Festival on January 24, 2017. It was released on June 2, 2017, by IFC Films.

== Plot ==
A married couple (Zoe Lister-Jones, Adam Pally), who fight non-stop, attempt to save their marriage by turning their arguments into songs.

== Cast ==
- Zoe Lister-Jones as Anna
- Adam Pally as Ben
- Fred Armisen as Dave
- Susie Essman as Shirley
- Hannah Simone as Grace
- Retta as Carol
- Ravi Patel as Bobby
- Brooklyn Decker as Candice
- Erinn Hayes as Crystal Vichycoisse
- Jesse Williams as Skyler
- Jamie Chung as Cassandra Diabla
- Nelson Franklin as Ned
- Angelique Cabral as Lauren
- Majandra Delfino as Maria
- Gillian Zinser as Sheena

Colin Hanks, Daryl Wein, and Chris D'Elia cameo as Uber passengers, Elisha Yaffe appears as a bartender, and Ryan Miller appears as a member of Skyler's drum circle.

== Production ==
In July 2016, it was announced Zoe Lister-Jones would write, direct, produce and star in the film alongside Hannah Simone, Colin Hanks, Brooklyn Decker, Jesse Williams, Susie Essman, Ravi Patel, Jamie Chung, Chris D’Elia, and Jerry O'Connell. Lister-Jones is serving as a producer under her Mister Lister banner, alongside QC Entertainment who will finance the film. Lucius composed the film's score.

=== Filming ===
Principal photography began in July 2016. It was filmed with an all-female crew.

== Release ==
The film had its world premiere at the 2017 Sundance Film Festival on January 24, 2017. Shortly after, IFC Films and Sony Pictures Worldwide Acquisitions acquired U.S. and international distribution rights, respectively. It was released on June 2, 2017.

=== Critical reception ===
Band Aid received positive reviews from film critics. It holds an 88% approval rating on review aggregator website Rotten Tomatoes, based on 74 reviews, with a weighted average of 6.9/10. The site's critical consensus reads, "Band Aid tells a solidly affecting story of a relationship on the rocks -- and marks star Zoe Lister-Jones, who also wrote and directed, as a tremendous triple threat worth watching." On Metacritic, the film holds a rating of 67 out of 100, based on 21 critics, indicating "generally favorable" reviews.

Andrew Barker of Variety gave the film a positive review, writing: "It lives and dies on Lister-Jones and Pally's chemistry, which the film is just as willing to test as to nurture." Sheri Lindin of The Hollywood Reporter also gave the film a positive review, writing: "An exuberantly low-key charmer that uses a light, wry touch to tackle such weighty matters as artistic drive and inertia and the male–female divide, while offering new fuel for drummer jokes." David Ehrlich of Indiewire also gave the film a positive review, writing: "The sweet and sincere Band Aid makes a convincing case that relationships are all about how you heal from them."
