= Zoe Lister-Jones =

American actress and screenwriter (b. 1982)

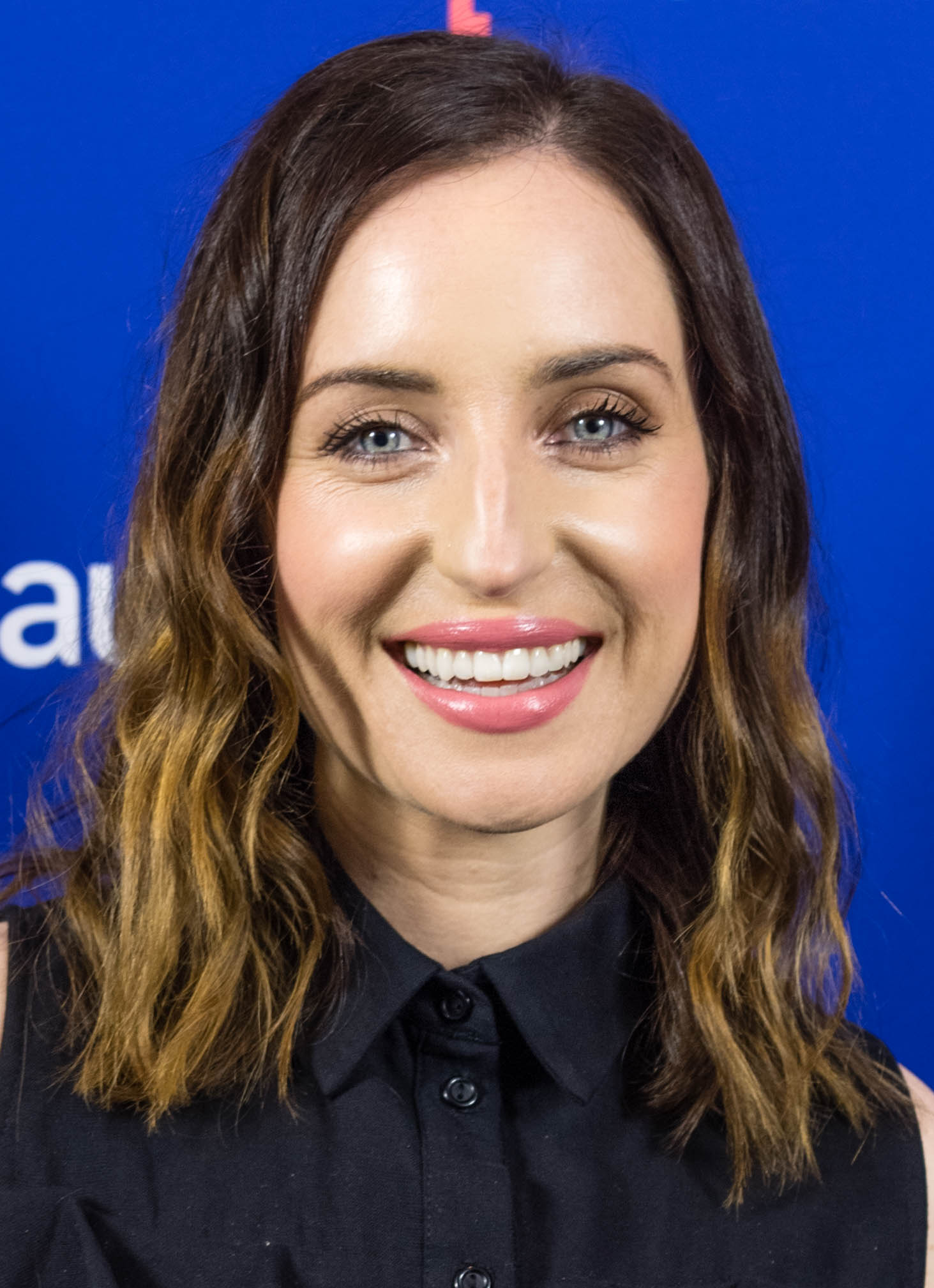
- Lister-Jones at 2017 Montclair Film Festival
- Born: September 1, 1982 (age 44); Brooklyn, New York City, U.S.
- Education: New York University (BFA)
- Occupations: Actress; director; producer; screenwriter
- Years active: 2004–present
- Spouse: Daryl Wein (m. 2013; div. 2021)
- Parents: Bill Jones (father); Ardele Lister (mother)

Zoe Lister-Jones (born September 1, 1982) is an American actress and filmmaker who co-starred as Jen Collins Short in the CBS sitcom Life in Pieces from 2015 to 2019. She is also known for her roles in the television shows Delocated (2009–2010), Whitney (2011–2013), and New Girl (2015). Lister-Jones made her directorial debut with the 2017 comedy-drama film Band Aid. In 2020, she wrote and directed the horror film The Craft: Legacy. During the COVID-19 pandemic she co-wrote and co-directed the comedy-drama film How It Ends (2021) with Daryl Wein. In 2023 she produced, wrote, directed, and starred in the comedy series Slip for The Roku Channel, with Dakota Johnson as executive producer under her TeaTime Pictures banner. On December 5, 2023, it was announced that Slip was nominated for two Independent Spirit Awards.

== Early life and education ==
Lister-Jones was born in Brooklyn, New York City. Her mother is the Canadian-born and New York-based video artist Ardele Lister, and her father is the American photographer and media artist Bill Jones. Her mother was born to a Jewish family, whereas her father converted to Judaism. In 2000, she graduated from Edward R. Murrow High School in Brooklyn. She graduated with honors from the Tisch School of the Arts at New York University and studied at the Royal Academy of Dramatic Arts in London. Lister-Jones performed with a rock band. Her mother was president of a local Conservative egalitarian synagogue that the family attended every Saturday, and she also kept a kosher home.

== Career ==
Her debut solo CD was titled Skip the Kiss. Kyle Forester, who composed the score for Breaking Upwards, arranged the music for Skip the Kiss.

Lister-Jones' New York City theater credits include Seminar, The Little Dog Laughed and The New Group's The Accomplices. Her screen credits include the political thriller State of Play, Salt, The Other Guys, The Marconi Bros., Day Zero, as well as quirky independent films such as Armless, Arranged, and Palladio (2005, directed by her father based on the Jonathan Dee novel). On television she has appeared in Law & Order, Law & Order: Criminal Intent, Law & Order: SVU, Law & Order: Trial by Jury, on HBO's Bored to Death, as Kim on Adult Swim's Delocated, as Lily in the cast of the NBC sitcom Whitney, as Kate in Friends with Better Lives, as Councilwoman Fawn Moscato in New Girl, as Jen in Life in Pieces and as Carolyn Hart in the HBO film Confirmation.

In 2004, Lister-Jones wrote and performed the one-woman, ten-character show Co-dependence is a Four Letter Word at New York City's Performance Space 122 (P.S.122).

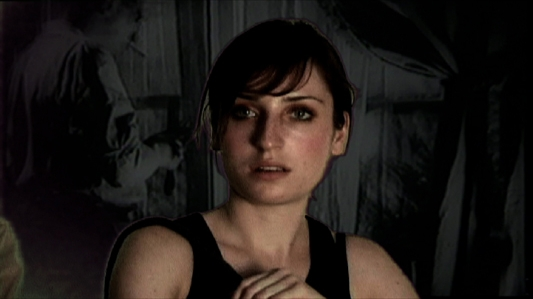
Zoe Lister-Jones in Palladio (2005) by Bill Jones

In 2007, she appeared in the independent film Arranged.

In 2009, Lister-Jones co-starred, co-produced (with Daryl Wein), and co-wrote (with Peter Duchan and Daryl Wein) the independent feature Breaking Upwards, which explores a young New York couple who, battling codependency, strategize their own break up. The film was shot in New York on a budget of $15,000, and was featured in a New York Times article as an example of sweat equity in the independent-film industry. Lister-Jones also wrote the lyrics and performed many of the tracks of the original motion picture sound track. Breaking Upwards premiered at the SXSW Film Festival in March, 2009.

Lister-Jones starred with Sam Rosen in Brady Kiernan's romantic drama Stuck Between Stations (2011) alongside Josh Hartnett and Michael Imperioli. Stuck Between Stations premiered as an official selection of the Viewpoints section at the SVA Theater at the 2011 Tribeca Film Festival in New York City, New York, U.S.A.

Lister-Jones starred in the independent feature film Lola Versus (2012), her second project co-written with director Daryl Wein. Distributed by Fox Searchlight Pictures, Lola Versus opened in theaters Summer 2012. It stars Greta Gerwig, Zoe Lister-Jones, Bill Pullman, Hamish Linklater, Debra Winger, Joel Kinnaman and Ebon Moss-Bachrach. Lola Versus premiered at New York's Tribeca Film Festival in April 2012.

Lister-Jones and Daryl Wein co-wrote Consumed (2015), their third feature-length collaboration directed by Wein. The political thriller, which focuses on the world of genetically modified organisms, began filming in May 2014 in Champaign-Urbana, Illinois with Shatterglass Studios. It stars Lister-Jones, Kunal Nayyar, Taylor Kinney, Victor Garber, Danny Glover, Griffin Dunne, Anthony Edwards, and Beth Grant. Consumed premiered at the Los Angeles Film Festival on June 15, 2015.

In 2017, Lister-Jones made her directorial debut with the indie film Band Aid, starring Lister-Jones, Adam Pally, Fred Armisen, Hannah Simone, Colin Hanks, Brooklyn Decker, Majandra Delfino, Jesse Williams, Susie Essman, Ravi Patel, Jamie Chung, Chris D’Elia, Retta, and Jerry O’Connell. The film features original songs with lyrics, written by Lister-Jones, and music, composed by Kyle Forester (Breaking Upwards). In 2020, she wrote and directed Columbia and Blumhouse's The Craft: Legacy, the sequel to the 1996 film The Craft.

In March 2022, it was announced Lister-Jones would write, direct and star in the comedy series Slip for The Roku Channel, with Dakota Johnson set to executive produce under her TeaTime Pictures banner. On December 5, 2023, it was announced that Slip was nominated twice for the 39th Independent Spirit Awards: Best New Scripted Series and Best Lead Performance in a New Scripted Series.

Lister-Jones co-stars in Pavements, a 2024 American experimental musical biopic concert film directed by Alex Ross Perry. It is a documentary/fiction hybrid film about the American indie band Pavement, incorporating scripted scenes with documentary footage of the band and a musical stage play consisting of songs from their discography. It premiered at the 81st Venice International Film Festival on September 4, 2024 and was released on May 2, 2025.

In January 2025, Lister-Jones was cast in Peacock's The Miniature Wife, along with Sofia Rosinsky, O-T Fagbenle, Sian Clifford and Ronny Chieng. In March 2025, Aasif Mandvi, Rong Fu and Tricia Black joined the cast.

In October 2026, Lister-Jones was cast in the Los Angeles production of Lungs opposite Ashley Zukerman. The two-person play written by Duncan Macmillan and directed by Jack Serio is the first Mainstage production to take place at Huron Station Playhouse.

== Personal life ==
In 2013, Lister-Jones married her acting, writing and production partner Daryl Wein. In 2021, she announced that they had split after a 17-year-relationship. Lister-Jones described how they had been "in and out of an open relationship."

In 2021, Lister-Jones accused actor Chris Noth of sexually harassing her during the filming of a 2005 episode of Law & Order: Criminal Intent.

In February 2024 at the 39th Spirit Awards, Lister-Jones revealed that she is queer and disclosed she is dating filmmaker Sammi Cohen.

== Filmography ==
=== Film ===
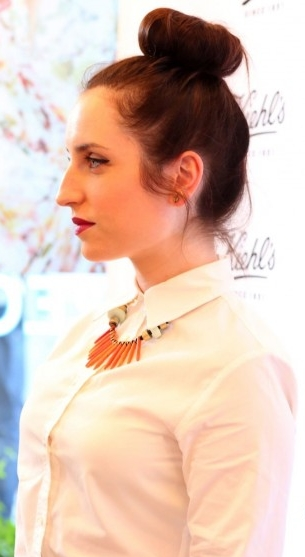
Zoe Lister-Jones at Earth Day party, 3 May 2017

| Year | Title | Role | Notes |
|---|---|---|---|
| 1986 | Zoe's Car | Zoe | Video short |
| 2004 | Nausea 2 | Annie Ball | Video project |
| 2005 | Anna on the Neck | Alessandra | Short film |
| 2005 | Palladio | Molly Howe | Art film |
| 2006 | New Boobs | Patricia Coleo | Short film |
| 2007 | Arranged | Rochel Meshenberg | |
| 2007 | The Last 15 | Stephanie Kirkland | Short film |
| 2007 | Day Zero | Jessica Hendricks | |
| 2007 | Turn the River | Kat | |
| 2007 | Five Difficult Situations | C | Short film |
| 2008 | The Marconi Bros. | Lauren | |
| 2008 | Explicit Ills | Jen | |
| 2008 | Goyband | Hani | |
| 2009 | Breaking Upwards | Zoe | Also writer and producer |
| 2009 | State of Play | Jessy | |
| 2010 | Armless | Jenny | |
| 2010 | Shadows & Lies | Rebecca | |
| 2010 | Salt | CIA Security Hub Tech | |
| 2010 | The Other Guys | Therapist | |
| 2010 | All Good Things | Press Conference Reporter | |
| 2011 | Stuck Between Stations | Rebecca | |
| 2012 | Lola Versus | Alice | Also writer |
| 2014 | Let's Get Digital | Sophie | Short film |
| 2015 | Consumed | Sophie Kessler | Also writer, and producer |
| 2016 | Confirmation | Carolyn Hart | Television film |
| 2017 | Band Aid | Anna | Also writer, lyricist, director, and producer |
| 2020 | The Craft: Legacy | —N/a | Writer and director |
| 2021 | How It Ends | Liza | Also writer and director |
| 2023 | A Good Person | Simone | |
| 2023 | Beau Is Afraid | Young Mona | |
| 2024 | Pavements | Anne | |

=== Television ===
| Year | Title | Role | Notes |
|---|---|---|---|
| 2005 | Law & Order: Trial by Jury | Trisha Ford | Episode: "Pattern of Conduct" |
| 2005 | Law & Order: Criminal Intent | Maya Sampson | Episode: "Diamond Dogs" |
| 2006 | Kidnapped | E.J. | Episode: "Sorry, Wrong Number" |
| 2006 | Law & Order | Hannah Welch | Episode: "Public Service Homicide" |
| 2006 | The Class | Jeanie Callucci | Episode: "The Class Goes to a Bar" |
| 2008 | Law & Order: Special Victims Unit | Faith | Episode: "Unorthodox" |
| 2009 | Washingtonienne | Chiara | Episode: "Pilot" |
| 2009 | State of Romance | Alice | Episode: "Pilot" |
| 2009 | Bored to Death | Michelle | Episode: "The Case of the Stolen Skateboard" |
| 2009–2010 | Delocated | Kim | Recurring role (15 episodes) |
| 2010 | The Good Wife | Charlotte Armitage | Episode: "Bad" |
| 2011–2013 | Whitney | Lily Dixon | Main role, 2 seasons |
| 2014 | Friends with Better Lives | Kate | Main role |
| 2015 | New Girl | Fawn Moscato | Recurring role (5 episodes) |
| 2015–2019 | Life in Pieces | Jen Short | Main role |
| 2023 | Slip | Mae Cannon | Main role, writer, director |
| 2025–present | Long Story Short | Susan Schwartz (voice) | Guest star |
| 2026 | DMV | Dr. Jacobs | Guest star |
| 2026 | Will Trent | Claudia | Guest star |
| 2026 | The Miniature Wife | Vivienne | Main role |

== Theater ==
=== Broadway ===
| Year | Title | Role | Venue | Notes |
|---|---|---|---|---|
| 2006 | The Little Dog Laughed | Ellen | Cort Theatre | |
| 2012 | Seminar | Kate | John Golden Theatre | |

=== Off Broadway ===
| Year | Title | Role | Venue | Notes |
|---|---|---|---|---|
| 2007 | The Accomplices | Betty | The New Group | |
| 2008 | The Marriage of Bette and Boo | Joan | Roundabout Theater Company | |
| 2022 | Slanted! Enchanted! A Pavement Musical | Anne | Sheen Center | |

=== One-woman shows ===
| Year | Title | Role | Venue | Notes |
|---|---|---|---|---|
| 2004 | Codependence Is a Four-Letter Word | Ten characters | P.S. 122 | |

=== Los Angeles ===
| Year | Title | Role | Venue | Notes |
|---|---|---|---|---|
| 2026 | Lungs | W | Huron Station Playhouse | |
