= Kyle Forester =

American singer-songwriter

Kyle Forester is an American multi-instrumentalist, composer, and singer-songwriter, best known as a member of the band Crystal Stilts.

== Biography ==
Born in New York, Forester joined The Ladybug Transistor in 2006, participating in the recording of the Here Comes the Rain EP. He joined Crystal Stilts that same year, first appearing on record on the single "Love is a Wave".

In 2009, Forester composed and recorded the soundtrack for the film Breaking Upwards.

In April 2016, Forester was asked by Jarvis Taveniere to join the DIY pioneers Woods as a multi-instrumentalist focusing on Rhodes, saxophone and percussion. He accepted, but has chosen to miss important gigs to focus on his solo career.

On May 20, 2016, Forester released his debut solo album, Kyle Forester on Flying Moonlight Records.

On February 21, 2020, he released a second solo album, entitled Hearts in Gardens.

== Selected discography ==
As solo artist

- Breaking Upwards (Original Motion Picture Soundtrack) (2009)
- Kyle Forester (2016)
- Hearts in Gardens (2020)

With The Ladybug Transistor

- Here Comes the Rain (2006)
- Can't Wait Another Day (2007)
- Clutching Stems (2011)

With Crystal Stilts

- "Love Is a Wave" b/w "Sugarbaby" 7" (Slumberland Records and Angular Recording Corporation, 2009)
- "Shake the Shackles" 7" (Slumberland Records, 2010)
- In Love with Oblivion (Fortuna Pop! (UK) and Slumberland Records (US), 2011)
- Radiant Door EP (Sacred Bones, 2011)
- "Precarious Stair" b/w "Temptation Inside Of Your Heart" (Little Teddy Recordings, 2011)
- "Through the Floor" 7" (Slumberland Records, 2011)
- Nature Noir (Sacred Bones, 2013)

With People

- 3xaWoman (Telegraph Harp, 2014)
