= Sex Positive (disambiguation) =

Sex positive or sex-positive may refer to:

- Sex Positive, 2008 documentary film directed by Daryl Wein about gay activist Richard Berkowitz
- Sex-positive movement, an ideology which promotes and embraces open sexuality with few limits beyond an emphasis on safe sex and the importance of informed consent
- Sex-positive feminism, aka pro-sex feminism, sex-radical feminism, or sexually liberal feminism, movement that centers on the idea that sexual freedom is an essential component of women's freedom
