= Sam Rosen =

Sam Rosen may refer to:

- Sam Rosen (actor), American actor and writer
- Sam Rosen (comics) (1922–1992), American comics letterer
- Sam Rosen (sportscaster) (born 1947), American sportscaster
- Sam Rosen (sprinter), winner of the 300 yards at the 1925 USA Indoor Track and Field Championships
- Sam Rosen, a character in the Tom Clancy novel Without Remorse
