= Daryl Wein =

American artist, filmmaker, producer and actor (born 1983)

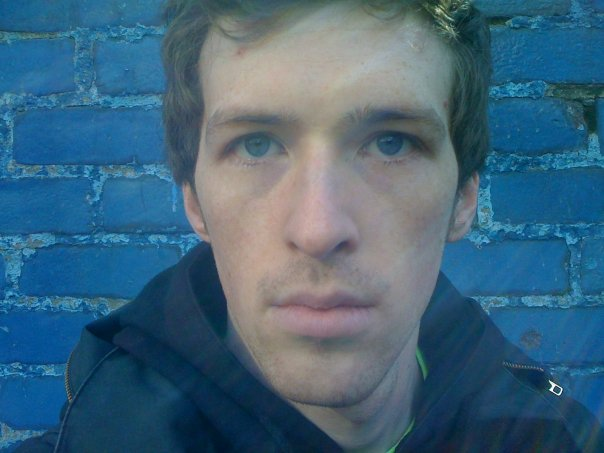
- Wein c. 2007–2008
- Born: Daryl Robert Wein; December 23, 1983 (age 42); Los Angeles, California, U.S.
- Occupations: Filmmaker, actor, producer, artist
- Years active: 2006–present
- Spouse: Zoe Lister-Jones (m. 2013; div. 2021)

Daryl Robert Wein (born December 23, 1983) is an American artist, filmmaker, producer and actor.

== Early life and education ==
Born in Los Angeles, California to Jan Sparling and Mitchell Wein, he was raised in Westport, Connecticut. His father worked as a creative director in advertising. He is Jewish.

Wein graduated from New York University Tisch School of the Arts in 2006. Prior to his senior year of high school, he attended a summer film intensive at the USC School of Cinematic Arts, where he made a 16mm short film.

== Career ==
In 2006, Wein co-wrote and directed Unlocked, a short psychological drama starring Olivia Thirlby executive produced by Stephen Daldry. It was an official selection at the Tribeca Film Festival and the Gijón International Film Festival in Spain.

Wein's debut feature-length film was Sex Positive, a documentary about gay hustler and AIDS activist Richard Berkowitz. Sex Positive was winner of the 2008 OUTFEST Grand Jury Prize for Best Documentary, and an official selection at the 2008 South by Southwest (SXSW) Film Festival, London Film Festival, Independent Film Festival of Boston, and other film festivals around the world. Regent Releasing distributed the film theatrically in North America. It has been released in 8 foreign countries, most notably at the BFI in London. Sex Positive was released on DVD in June 2010.

Wein's first feature-length narrative film was Breaking Upwards (2009), starring Zoe Lister-Jones, Julie White, Peter Friedman, Olivia Thirlby and Andrea Martin. He co-wrote the screenplay with Peter Duchan and Lister-Jones. Breaking Upwards explores a young, real-life New York couple who, battling codependency, decide to intricately strategize their own break up. The film was shot on location in New York and Brooklyn on a budget of approximately $15,000 and lauded as an example of sweat equity in the indie film industry by the New York Times. Breaking Upwards premiered at the SXSW Film Festival in March, 2009. Wein has said the film was inspired by an open relationship he was in, where they decided to strategize their breakup over the course of a year.

Wein is the director of the independent feature film Lola Versus (2012), his second collaboration co-written with Zoe Lister-Jones. Lola Versus premiered at New York's Tribeca Film Festival in April 2012. Distributed by Fox Searchlight Pictures, Lola Versus opened in theaters during the summer of 2012; It stars Greta Gerwig, Zoe Lister-Jones, Bill Pullman, Hamish Linklater, Debra Winger, Joel Kinnaman, and Ebon Moss-Bachrach.

In 2014, Wein wrote and directed the short Let's Get Digital for the SXSW festival. Starring Zoe Lister-Jones, Ryan Hansen, Megan Ferguson, and Jon Heder, the film was an installment of AT&T's short film series "The Network Diaries", part of the Mobile Movement showcase about young Americans communicating through mobile technology and social networking platforms.

Wein and Lister-Jones co-wrote Consumed (2015), their third feature-length collaboration directed by Wein. The political thriller, which focuses on the world of genetically modified organisms, began filming in May 2014 in Champaign-Urbana, Illinois with Shatterglass Studios and subsequently premiered at the Los Angeles Film Festival on June 15, 2015. Mar Vista distributed the film worldwide.

Wein's feature Blueprint (2017), developed with, co-written by and starring Jerod Haynes, chronicles the crisis of a young African American living in South Side of Chicago whose best friend is killed in a police shooting. Blueprint premiered at the Deauville Film Festival on September 6, 2017. The Orchard released the film worldwide.

Wein executive produced Band Aid, written and directed by Zoe Lister-Jones, which premiered at the 2017 Sundance Film Festival. IFC Films released the film and Sony International took foreign.

Wein's next feature, White Rabbit, co-written with and starring Vivian Bang, was a dramatic comedy about a young Korean-American performance artist who struggles to be authentically heard and seen through her DIY performances in modern Los Angeles. It premiered at the Sundance Film Festival on January 19, 2018.

Wein co-directed, co-produced, co-wrote, and co-DP'd the film How It Ends, which premiered at the 2021 Sundance Film Festival and stars Zoe Lister-Jones, Cailee Spaeny, Nick Kroll, Olivia Wilde, Helen Hunt, Lamorne Morris, Fred Armisen, Bradley Whitford, Charlie Day, and Whitney Cummings.

In television, Wein has directed episodes of Mozart in the Jungle for Amazon and Single Parents for ABC.

== Personal life ==
In 2013, Wein married Zoe Lister-Jones. Lister-Jones announced that they had split in September 2021.

== Filmography ==
As filmmaker
Year	Title	Credited as			Distribution	Notes
Year	Title	Director	Producer	Writer	Distribution	Notes
2006	Unlocked	Yes	Yes	Screenplay		Short film
2008	Sex Positive	Yes	Yes	Screenplay		Documentary
2009	Breaking Upwards	Yes	Yes	Screenplay	IFC Films	Feature film
2012	Lola Versus	Yes		Screenplay	Fox Searchlight	Feature film
2014	Let's Get Digital	Yes		Screenplay		Short film
2014	Brooklyn Decker Threesome	Yes				Short film
2014	Mozart in the Jungle	Yes				Web series, episode: "Now, Fortissimo!"
2015	Consumed	Yes	Yes	Screenplay		Feature film
2016	Band Aid		Yes			Feature film
2017	Blueprint	Yes	Yes	Screenplay		Feature film
2018	White Rabbit	Yes	Yes	Screenplay		Feature film
2021	How It Ends	Yes	Yes	Screenplay		Feature film
2022	Something from Tiffany's	Yes	No	No		Feature film
2024	Electra	No	Yes	Screenplay		Feature film

As actor
Year	Title	Role	Notes
2001	Magic Rock	Tanner	
2002	Porn 'n Chicken	Pimply	TV movie
2003	The Hebrew Hammer	Teenage Gentile	
2003	Ed	Student Tommy	TV series, episode: "History Lessons"
2009	Breaking Upwards	Daryl	Movie
2017	Life in Pieces	Elijah	TV series, episode: "Late Smuggling Dreambaby Voucher"
2024	Electra	Dylan Andrews	
