= Downhill (2020 film) =

Comedy drama film by Nat Faxon and Jim Rash

- Theatrical release poster
- Directed by: Nat Faxon; Jim Rash
- Screenplay by: Jesse Armstrong; Nat Faxon; Jim Rash
- Based on: Force Majeure by Ruben Östlund
- Produced by: Stefanie Azpiazu; Anthony Bregman; Julia Louis-Dreyfus
- Starring: Julia Louis-Dreyfus; Will Ferrell
- Cinematography: Danny Cohen
- Edited by: Pamela Martin
- Music by: Volker Bertelmann
- Production companies: Searchlight Pictures; Likely Story; Filmhaus Films
- Distributed by: Searchlight Pictures
- Release dates: January 26, 2020 (Sundance); February 14, 2020 (United States)
- Running time: 86 minutes
- Country: United States
- Language: English
- Box office: $9 million

Downhill is a 2020 American black comedy-drama film directed by Nat Faxon and Jim Rash, who also co-wrote the script with Jesse Armstrong. The film is a remake of Force Majeure (2014) by Swedish director Ruben Östlund. It stars Julia Louis-Dreyfus and Will Ferrell as a married couple going through a rough patch after a near-death encounter during a family ski outing.

Downhill had its world premiere at the Sundance Film Festival on January 26, 2020, and was theatrically released on February 14, 2020, by Searchlight Pictures, the first feature film to be released under the studio's new name following The Walt Disney Company's acquisition of 21st Century Fox. The film received mixed reviews from critics and grossed $9 million worldwide.

== Premise ==
After believing they were about to die in an avalanche during a family ski vacation in Ischgl, Austria, a married couple begin to reevaluate their lives and how they feel about each other.

== Cast ==
- Julia Louis-Dreyfus as Billie Stanton
- Will Ferrell as Pete Stanton
- Miranda Otto as Lady Bobo
- Zoë Chao as Rosie
- Zach Woods as Zach
- Kristofer Hivju as Michel
- Alex Macqueen as Charlie
- Julian Grey as Finn Stanton
- Ammon Jacob Ford as Emerson Stanton
- Giulio Berruti as Guglielmo

== Production ==
It was announced in November 2018 that an English-language remake of the Swedish film Force Majeure would be directed by Nat Faxon and Jim Rash, who both co-wrote the script with Jesse Armstrong. Julia Louis-Dreyfus and Will Ferrell were cast to star. Miranda Otto, Zoë Chao and Zach Woods also joined the cast, in December. Kristofer Hivju appears in the film, the only original cast member from Force Majeure to be involved.

Filming began in January 2019 in Austria.

== Release ==
Downhill had its world premiere at the Sundance Film Festival on January 26, 2020. The film was released on February 14, 2020, replacing Fox's The King's Man, which had been scheduled for that date.

=== Home media ===
Downhill was released on Blu-ray, DVD, and Digital on May 19, 2020 by Walt Disney Studios Home Entertainment.

== Reception ==
=== Box office ===
In the United States and Canada, Downhill was released alongside Sonic the Hedgehog, The Photograph and Fantasy Island, and was projected to gross around $4 million from 2,275 theaters in its four-day opening weekend. It made $2.6 million on its first day and $5.2 million over the four days, finishing tenth.

=== Critical response ===
On review aggregator website Rotten Tomatoes, the film holds an approval rating of 37% based on 211 reviews, with an average of 5.3/10. The site's critical consensus reads, "Fittingly named for a remake whose charms are dwarfed by its superior source material, Downhill is frequently -- and frustratingly -- less than the sum of its talented parts." On Metacritic, the film holds a weighted average score of 49 out of 100, based on 39 critics, indicating "mixed or average" reviews. Audiences polled by CinemaScore gave the film an average grade of "D" on an A+ to F scale, and PostTrak reported it received an average 1 out of 5 stars, with 26% of people saying they would definitely recommend it.

On RogerEbert.com, Nick Allen gave the film 2 out of 4 stars, saying, "It's yet another instance in which it's hard to not think about what could have been, especially since the original did it so much better."
