= Consumed (2015 film) =

- Theatrical release poster
- Directed by: Daryl Wein
- Written by: Daryl Wein; Zoe Lister-Jones
- Produced by: Daryl Wein; Zoe Lister-Jones
- Starring: Zoe Lister-Jones; Anthony Edwards; Victor Garber; Danny Glover; Taylor Kinney; Kunal Nayyar; Beth Grant
- Cinematography: Alex Bergman
- Edited by: Zach Anderson
- Music by: Nima Fakhrara
- Production company: MarVista Entertainment
- Distributed by: MarVista Entertainment
- Release date: June 15, 2015 (Los Angeles)
- Running time: 97 minutes
- Country: United States
- Language: English

Consumed (also known as Food Movie) is a 2015 American political thriller film by Daryl Wein and starring Zoe Lister-Jones, Beth Grant, Anthony Edwards, Victor Garber, Kunal Nayyar, Danny Glover and Taylor Kinney.

== Plot ==
In the summer of 2014, Sophie Kessler, a waitress and single mother, who lives with her diabetic mother Kristin and her son Garret in Iowa, discovers that her son is vomiting in his sleep. Fearing that he had developed a new kind of flu, she rushes him to the doctor who reassures her. Garret then develops a rash that neither a pediatrician, dermatologist, or psychologist can diagnose. Sophie theorizes that Garret might have a disease linked to genetically modified organisms. Sophie then goes to a science lab at the university where her mother works as a secretary and meets scientist, Serge Negani. She then meets Peter Landell, who overhears Sophie talking to Serge about her worries for her son, claiming to be a university scientist, claims about files containing the answers to her questions. Sophie leaves Garret with Eddie, a man she met at Garret's school and sneaks into the university with Peter to find the files, using her mother's keys. After discovering that the files are missing, security guards find them and reveal that Peter is really a janitor.

Serge, who has been researching biotech chickens and GMO reactions on rats with fellow scientist Jacob, discovers the chickens to be dead and looks through Jacob's computer for any information. He finds information, exposing the dangers of the project, prints it, puts it into a box, and into the trunk of his car. He calls Sophie to tell her, but she is stressed after finding out that Eddie works as a cop for the GMO corporation, Clonestra, that owns half of Iowa. She refuses to speak with him and hangs up on him. Serge gets into his car and begins to drive to Sophie's house to show her the information. Serge is then pursued by two of Eddie's friends who run him off an interstate, he crashes and is killed upon impact.

After hearing of the accident on the news, Sophie goes to see Serge's widow, who tells her that Serge's grandfather was a farmer in India who was growing GMO corn, with seeds given by Clonestra, which eventually led to the death of their crops which led his grandfather and other farmers to commit suicide in protest. Sophie then goes to a scrap-metal yard, where Serge's car was taken to once it was destroyed, and retrieves the information and takes it to Clonestra with Eddie's help, leading the CEO, Dan Conoway, to resign, after Kristin posts a YouTube video of Sophie explaining to Dan Conoway about the reasons to label genetically modified food. Some time later, Sophie, Garret, Kristin, Eddie, and Eddie's son, Tommy, go to a football game. Sophie then sees numerous people eating food like hot dogs and popcorn and she begins to experience anxiety with her heart pounding rapidly.

== Cast ==
- Zoe Lister-Jones as Sophie Kessler; a waitress and single mother whose son develops a mysterious illness.
- Danny Glover as Hal Westbrook; an organic farmer.
- Victor Garber as Dan Conway; CEO of Clonestera.
- Taylor Kinney as Eddie Taylor; a GMO cop.
- Anthony Edwards as Jacob Leifman; scientist at university.
- Griffin Dunne as Peter Landell; janitor at university.
- Kunal Nayyar as Serge Negani; an Indian scientist who discovers the negative results of GMO foods.
- Beth Grant as Kristin Kessler; Sophie's diabetic mother and Garrett's grandmother.
- Nick Bonn as Garrett Kessler; Sophie's son and Kristin's grandson who develops a mysterious illness.
- Elizabeth Marvel as Connie Conway; Dan Conway's wife.
- Mouzam Makkar as Mrs. Negani; Serge's widow.
- Lexi DeSollar as Extra

== Release ==
The film premiered at the Los Angeles Film Festival on June 15, 2015. The film was also screened theatrically through GATHR's on-demand distribution platform, allowing communities to host local screenings
