= Crystal Stilts =

American post-punk band

- Origin: New York City, New York, U.S.
- Genres: Noise pop; post-punk; neo-psychedelia; dream pop; garage rock; jangle pop
- Years active: 2003–present
- Labels: Slumberland Records; Sacred Bones Records; Angular Recording Corporation; Little Teddy Recordings; Feathery Tongue
- Members: Brad Hargett; JB Townsend; Kyle Forester; Andy Adler; Keegan Cooke
- Past members: Sean Mafucci; John Ter Louw "Jonny T"; Sean McGahan; Jeff Baron; Chris Millstein; Frankie Rose
- Website: Crystal Stilts official website, Crystal Stilts MySpace page

Crystal Stilts is an American post-punk band from Brooklyn, New York City, though their founding members, Brad Hargett and JB Townsend, were originally from Florida.

== History ==
Crystal Stilts was formed in 2003 by Brad Hargett and JB Townsend. After releasing one single and an EP, the pair expanded to five members before signing to Slumberland Records in the US and Angular Recording Corporation in Europe and releasing their debut, Alight of Night, in 2008. The band played the Pitchfork stage at the 2009 Primavera Sound festival in Barcelona. After a few bouts of touring and some down-time, the band returned in 2011 with the LP In Love With Oblivion, in April 2011 and the Radiant Door EP in November 2011. In 2013 they released their third album, Nature Noir, "expanding their sound to incorporate elements of soul, country, and folk." The group currently resides in Brooklyn, New York.

== Members ==
- Brad Hargett – vocals
- JB Townsend – guitar
- Kyle Forester – keyboards
- Andy Adler – bass
- Keegan Cooke – drums

== Discography ==
=== Studio albums ===
- Alight of Night (Slumberland Records, 2008 and Angular Recording Corporation, 2009)
- In Love with Oblivion (Fortuna Pop! (UK) and Slumberland Records (US), 2011)
- Nature Noir (Sacred Bones, 2013)

=== Singles ===
- "Shattered Shine" b/w "lights" 7" (Feathery Tongue, 2004)
- "Departure" 7" (Angular Recording Corporation, 2009)
- "Love Is a Wave" b/w "Sugarbaby" 7" (Slumberland Records and Angular Recording Corporation, 2009)
- "Shake the Shackles" 7" (Slumberland Records, 2010)
- "Precarious Stair" b/w "Temptation Inside Of Your Heart" (Little Teddy Recordings, 2011)
- "Through the Floor" 7" (Slumberland Records, 2011)

=== EPs ===
- EP (Feathery Tongue, 2005)
- Crystal Stilts EP (Woodsist, re-press 2008)
- Radiant Door EP (Sacred Bones, 2011)
