= Brady Kiernan =

American film director

Brady Kiernan is a filmmaker. His debut feature was Stuck Between Stations, starring Sam Rosen and Zoe Lister-Jones.
