= Cailee Spaeny =

American actress (born 1998)

- Spaeny in 2026
- Born: July 24, 1998 (age 28); Knoxville, Tennessee, U.S.
- Occupation: Actress
- Years active: 2014–present

Cailee Spaeny (/ˈkeɪli ˈspeɪni/ KAY-lee SPAY-nee; born July 24, 1998) is an American actress. Her first major roles were in the science fiction film Pacific Rim Uprising and the neo-noir film Bad Times at the El Royale (both 2018). Her television roles include appearances in the miniseries Devs (2020), Mare of Easttown (2021), and the second season of the anthology series Beef (2026). For producing the latter, she earned a nomination for the Primetime Emmy Award for Outstanding Limited or Anthology Series.

In 2023, Spaeny received critical acclaim for her portrayal of Priscilla Presley in the biographical film Priscilla, for which she received the Volpi Cup for Best Actress and a nomination for a Golden Globe Award. She gained further recognition for her roles in the dystopian drama film Civil War (2024), the science fiction horror film Alien: Romulus (2024), and the murder mystery Wake Up Dead Man (2025).

== Early life ==
Spaeny was born on July 24, 1998, in Knoxville, Tennessee, to Mark and Reja Spaeny. The seventh of nine children, she was raised in Springfield, Missouri, as a Southern Baptist. Growing up, she was in the Springfield Little Theatre group, acting in many plays, and taking acting, voice, and dance classes six days a week. When she was 13, she dropped out of school to pursue acting and briefly worked at Silver Dollar City. In the 2014–2015 season, she landed the role of Dorothy in a stage production of The Wizard of Oz.

== Career ==
=== Early work (2018–2021) ===
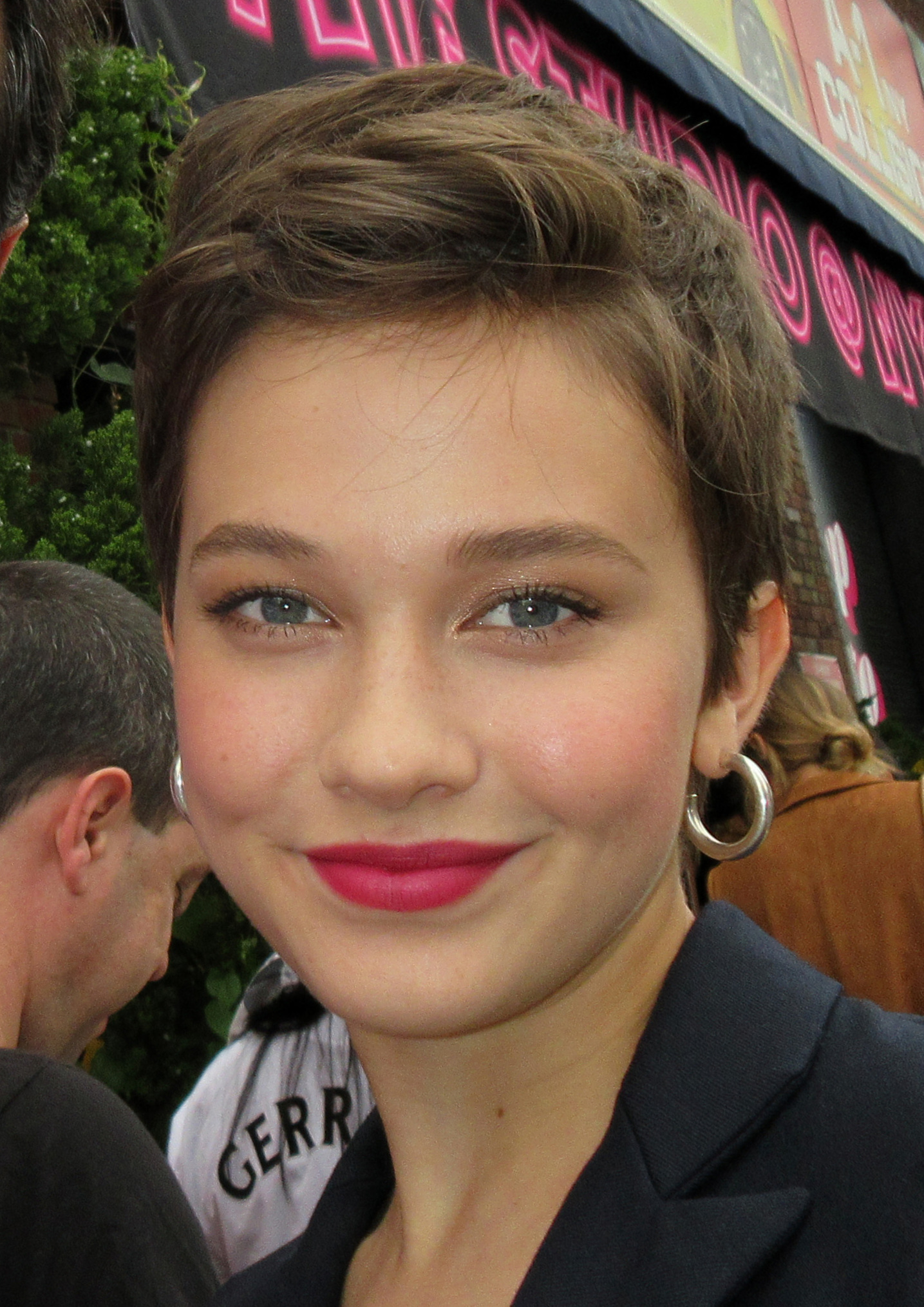
Spaeny in 2018

Spaeny made her film debut in March 2018 in Pacific Rim: Uprising, the sequel to Pacific Rim (2013), directed by Steven S. DeKnight. She played Amara Namani, one of the protagonists, an orphan who becomes a self‑taught engineer. Her performance was generally well-received, especially given that it was her first major film role.

Spaeny appeared in three more films in 2018. In September, she joined the cast of Bad Times at the El Royale, a thriller directed by Drew Goddard, in which she played Rose Summerspring, the younger sister of Emily Summerspring, played by Dakota Johnson. The character is a fragile and impressionable teenager, manipulated by the cult led by Billy Lee, played by Chris Hemsworth. The role highlighted Spaeny's versatility; after playing the determined Amara in Pacific Rim: Uprising, she took on a character marked by vulnerability.

In November, Spaeny appeared in On the Basis of Sex, a biographical legal drama directed by Mimi Leder based on the life and early cases of Ruth Bader Ginsburg, the second woman to serve as a justice of the Supreme Court of the United States. In the film, Spaeny played Jane C. Ginsburg, the elder daughter of Ruth Bader Ginsburg, portrayed by Felicity Jones. In December, she appeared in Vice, a biographical comedy-drama written and directed by Adam McKay about the life of Dick Cheney, played by Christian Bale. In the film, Spaeny played Lynne Vincent, a teenage version of Lynne Cheney, with the adult version portrayed by Amy Adams.

In March 2020, Spaeny made her television debut in the miniseries Devs, created by Alex Garland. She played Lyndon, a central member of the team working on the secret Devs project developed by the technology company Amaya. In October, she starred in The Craft: Legacy, a supernatural horror film written and directed by Zoe Lister-Jones, conceived as a sequel to The Craft (1996). This was Spaeny's first leading role in a film, as well as her first time going through a casting process. The film follows a group of young women who develop supernatural abilities.

In January 2021, Spaeny appeared in How It Ends, an independent apocalyptic comedy also directed by Lister-Jones. She played Young Liza (also called "Little Liza" or "Younger Self"), a teenage version of the protagonist Liza, played as an adult by the director. In April, she joined the cast of the HBO miniseries Mare of Easttown, created by Brad Ingelsby and starring Kate Winslet. Spaeny played Erin McMenamin, a 17-year-old single mother living in Easttown, a small working‑class town in Pennsylvania. Her character faces financial difficulties while caring for her son, who needs an expensive hearing surgery.

=== Breakthrough (2022–present) ===
In April 2022, Spaeny joined the cast of the series The First Lady, which depicts the personal and family lives of three First Ladies of the United States: Eleanor Roosevelt, Betty Ford, and Michelle Obama. Spaeny played Anna Eleanor Roosevelt (also known as Anna Roosevelt Halsted), the only daughter of Franklin D. Roosevelt and Eleanor Roosevelt.

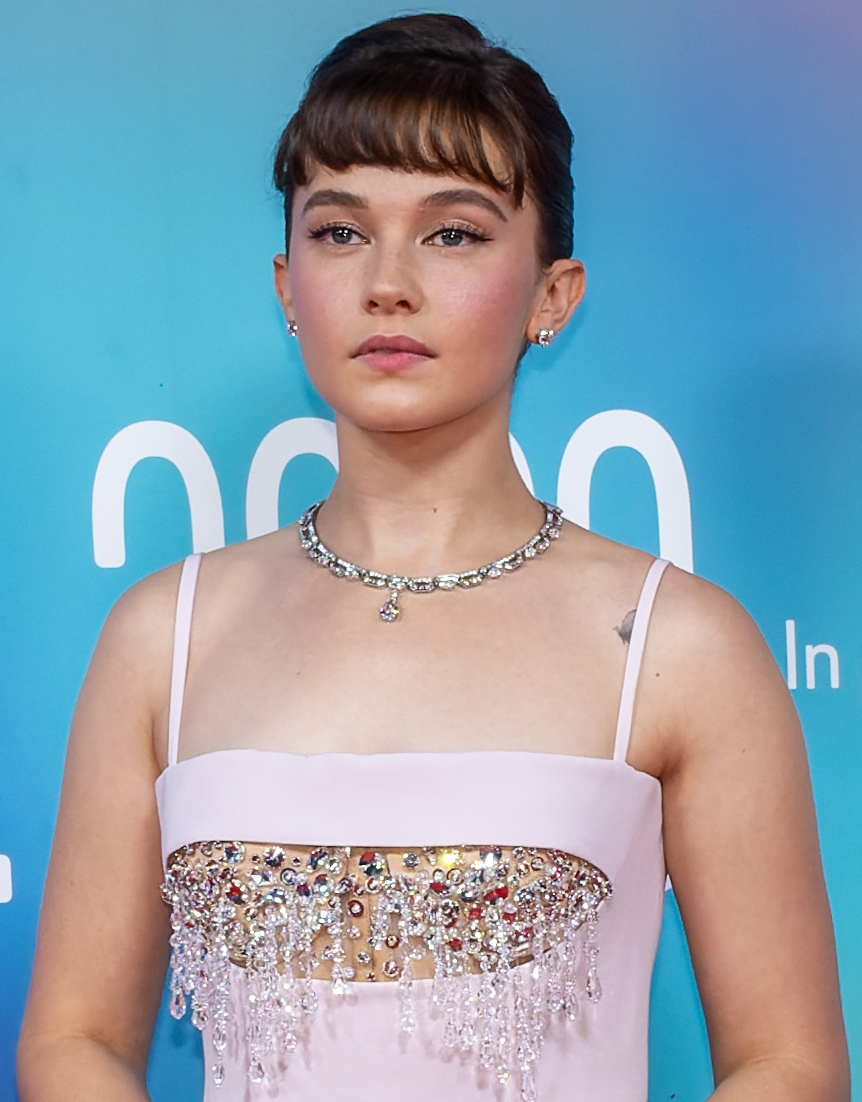
Spaeny at the 2023 BFI London Film Festival

In September, Spaeny was cast as Priscilla Beaulieu Presley in the film Priscilla, directed by Sofia Coppola, alongside Jacob Elordi as Elvis Presley. Based on Priscilla Presley's 1985 memoir Elvis and Me, the film premiered at the 80th Venice International Film Festival. Spaeny was widely acclaimed for her performance, which earned her the Volpi Cup for Best Actress. At the premiere, she watched the film alongside Priscilla Presley herself, who was moved by the work and by Spaeny's performance. Of her preparation for playing the character, Spaeny said: "It was very daunting, but I was very lucky to spend some time with Priscilla, and she was very generous. When you're playing someone so well-known, that support makes all the difference. She was very kind to me and supported me, and that was my main source, besides the book."

In 2024, Spaeny starred in the dystopian war drama and action film Civil War, directed by Alex Garland, with whom she had worked on Devs. She played Jessie Collin, an aspiring war photographer. Also in 2024, she starred in Alien: Romulus, a film directed by Fede Álvarez and produced by Ridley Scott, part of the Alien franchise. She played the space colonist Rain Carradine. Jordan Hoffman of Entertainment Weekly called Spaeny "the finest weapon in the arsenal... differentiating herself quite a bit from the doe-eyed characters she played in Civil War and Priscilla."

In 2025, Spaeny appeared in Wake Up Dead Man, a film in the Knives Out franchise, written and directed by Rian Johnson and starring Daniel Craig. She played Simone Vivane, a former cellist of international renown whose career was interrupted by chronic neuropathic pain.

In 2026, Spaeny starred in the second season of the anthology series Beef, alongside Oscar Isaac, Carey Mulligan, and Charles Melton. She was also cast in Elden Ring, a live-action film adaptation of the eponymous game set for a March 2028 release.

== Filmography ==
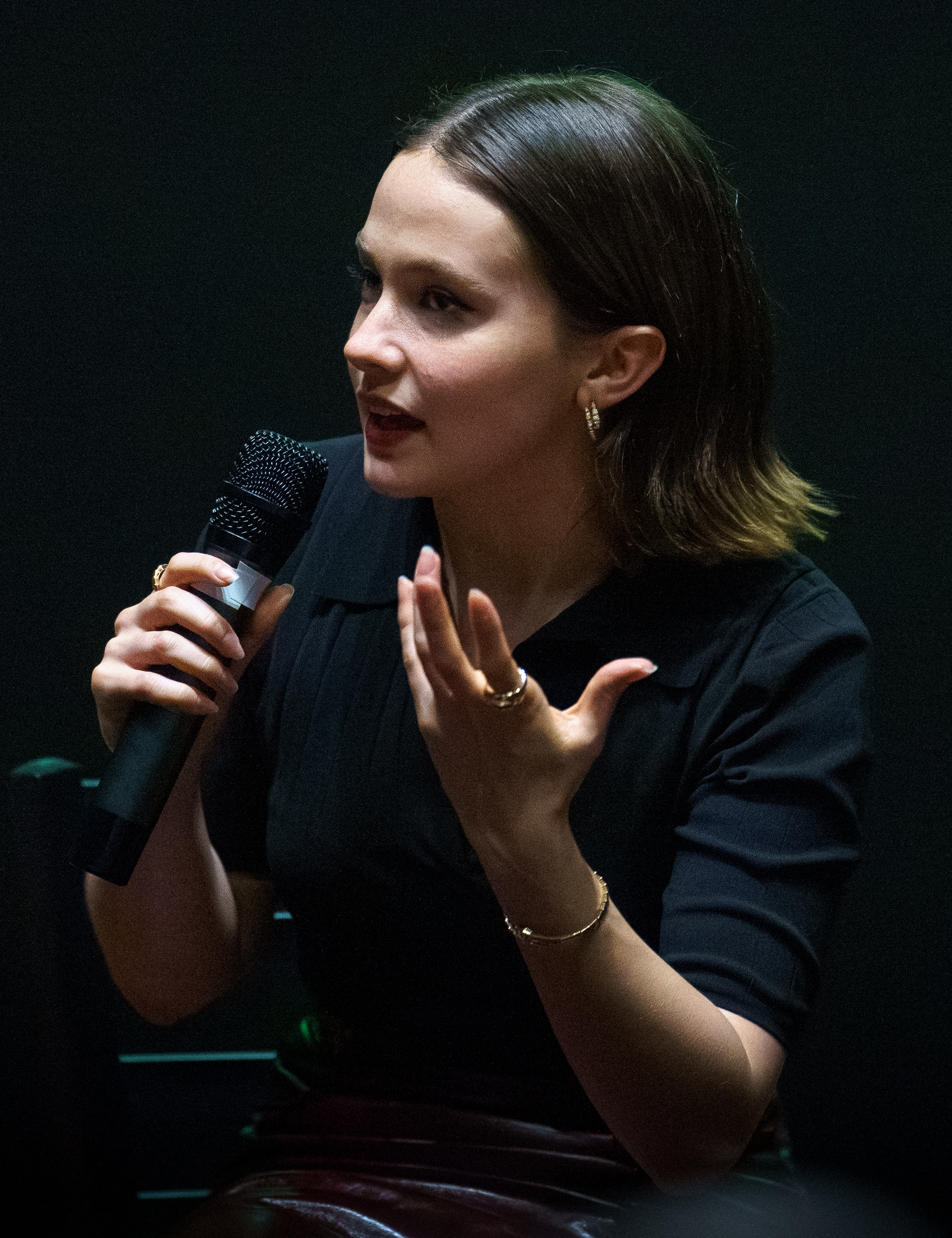
Spaeny speaking at the 2024 South by Southwest Film & TV Festival

Key
†	Denotes films that have not yet been released

=== Film ===
List of Cailee Spaeny's film roles
Year	Title	Role	Notes
2016	Counting to 1000	Erica	Short film
2018	Pacific Rim Uprising	Amara Namani	
2018	Bad Times at the El Royale	Rose Summerspring	
2018	On the Basis of Sex	Jane Ginsburg	
2018	Vice	Lynne Cheney (young)	
2020	The Craft: Legacy	Lilith "Lily" Schechner	
2021	How It Ends	Young Liza	
2022	Unlimited World	Lars	Short film
2023	Priscilla	Priscilla Presley	
2024	Civil War	Jessie Cullen	
2024	Alien: Romulus	Marie Raines "Rain" Carradine	
2025	Wake Up Dead Man	Simone Vivane	
2027	Deep Cuts †	Eileen "Percy" Marks	Post-production
2028	Elden Ring †	TBA	Post-production

=== Television ===
List of Cailee Spaeny's television appearances and roles
Year	Title	Role	Notes
2020	Devs	Lyndon	Miniseries (8 episodes)
2021	Mare of Easttown	Erin McMenamin	Miniseries (5 episodes)
2022	The First Lady	Anna Eleanor Roosevelt Halsted	Recurring role (7 episodes)
2026	Beef	Ashley Miller	Season 2 Also executive producer

=== Video games ===
List of Cailee Spaeny's video game appearances and roles
Year	Title	Role	Notes
2024	Dead by Daylight	Rain Carradine	Playable character; likeness

=== Music videos ===
- "Send Her to Heaven" (2019), by The All-American Rejects

== Awards and nominations ==
Award	Year	Category	Nominated work	Result	Ref.
Chicago Indie Critics	2024	Breakout Artist	Priscilla	Nominated	
Columbus Film Critics Association	2025	Actor of the Year (for an exemplary body of work)	Alien: Romulus / Civil War	Nominated	
Florida Film Critics Circle	2023	Breakout Award	Priscilla	Nominated	
Golden Globe Awards	2024	Best Actress in a Motion Picture – Drama	Priscilla	Nominated	
Gotham Awards	2023	Outstanding Lead Performance	Priscilla	Nominated	
Greater Western New York Film Critics Association	2023	Breakthrough Performance	Priscilla	Nominated	
Hollywood Creative Alliance Midseason Awards	2024	Best Supporting Actress	Civil War	Nominated	
London Critics Circle Film Awards	2024	Breakthrough Performer of the Year	Priscilla	Nominated	
North Texas Film Critics Association	2023	Best Actress	Priscilla	Nominated	
Online Film & Television Association	2023	Breakthrough Performance: Female	Priscilla	Nominated	
Primetime Emmy Awards	2026	Outstanding Limited or Anthology Series	Beef (as producer)	Nominated	
Satellite Awards	2024	Best Actress in a Motion Picture – Comedy or Musical	Priscilla	Nominated	
Saturn Awards	2025	Best Supporting Actress	Alien: Romulus	Nominated	
Venice International Film Festival	2023	Best Actress	Priscilla	Won	
