= In Love with Oblivion =

In Love With Oblivion

Studio album by Crystal Stilts
- Released: April 11, 2011
- Genres: Noise pop; neo-psychedelia; post-punk; shoegaze
- Length: 43:39
- Labels: Slumberland Records (US), Fortuna Pop! (UK)

Crystal Stilts chronology
Alight of Night (2008)	In Love With Oblivion (2011)	Nature Noir (2013)

Singles from In Love With Oblivion
- 1. "Shake the Shackles" Released: 2010; 2. "Through the Floor" Released: March 2011

Professional ratings
Aggregate scores
Source	Rating
Metacritic	(78/100)
Review scores
Source	Rating
AllMusic	4/5 stars
AU Magazine	(9/10)
Beats Per Minute	(8.2/10)
Filter	(8.6/10)
Is this music?	4/5 stars
NME	(8/10)
No Ripchord	4/5 stars
NOW	4/5 stars
The Phoenix	3.5/4 stars
Pitchfork	(7.9/10)
PopMatters	(8/10)
Q Magazine	4/5 stars
Tiny Mix Tapes	4/5 marks

In Love With Oblivion is the second studio album by Brooklyn-based post-punk band Crystal Stilts, which was released on April 11, 2011, in the UK and April 12 in the US. The album is the follow-up to 2010's "Shake the Shackles" 7-inch and 2008's debut Alight of Night.

== Reception ==
It went on to receive much critical acclaim, being praised for expanding and even "perfecting" their sound according to Tim Sendra of the AllMusic guide. The album generated an even higher aggregate score on Metacritic than the band's lauded debut. While Doug Mosurock of Dusted Magazine and Other Music declared it a "blaring masterpiece," Edward Comentale, director of Undergraduate studies at Indiana University, in his 4-star review for Tiny Mix Tapes stated, "As we trek across these dark plains of sound, the manic bop of early rockabilly becomes the dark buzz of surf-rock psychedelia becomes the hip sleaze of States-side punk. Don’t mind the warning beep in the background; sinister American pop — whether it’s Johnny Cash or Jim Morrison or Joey Ramone — never felt so good." AU Magazine, in a 9 out of 10 review, said simply, "Crystal Stilts have scaled the peaks of Noise-pop and have created a sublime album in doing so."

Culturespill did a feature on it in their 'Best Albums of 2011' Series. Rob Gannon of [Sic] Magazine would place in Love with Oblivion at No. 6 in his top 50 albums of 2011, describing it as an "Iconic sounding, 60s psyche-indebted garage masterpiece that reels from classic to classic... Crystal Stilts are fast becoming one of America’s best bands."

Several notable artists in music also expressed their admiration for in Love with Oblivion. Bradford Cox of Deerhunter would go on to name it the album of the year along with companion EP Radiant Door. Martin Bramah, a founding member of The Fall and creative force behind The Blue Orchids, declared in Love with Oblivion his 9th favorite album of all time. He called it "timeless" and said "You can hear all their influences up front, but they’re all put together in a fresh and exciting way, with wit and intelligence and a kind of noir nonchalance." He then relates a humorous anecdote, "Imagine if you will, Jim Morrison's nerdy kid brother unearths a huge, ancient conspiracy and decides to form a garage band so the world might come to understand – yeah, something like that is going on here."

== Track listing ==
1. "Sycamore Tree" – 5:16
2. "Through the Floor" – 2:23
3. "Silver Sun" – 3:03
4. "Alien Rivers" – 7:18
5. "Half a Moon" – 2:44
6. "Flying into the Sun" – 3:34
7. "Shake the Shackles" – 3:57
8. "Precarious Stair" – 3:11
9. "Invisible City" – 4:47
10. "Blood Barons" – 3:57
11. "Prometheus at Large" – 3:34

== Personnel ==
- Brad Hargett – vocals
- JB Townsend – guitar
- Kyle Forester – keyboards
- Andy Adler – bass guitar
- Keegan Cooke – drums
