= White Rabbit (2018 film) =

- Directed by: Daryl Wein
- Written by: Daryl Wein; Vivian Bang
- Produced by: Daryl Wein; Vivian Bang
- Starring: Vivian Bang
- Cinematography: Tyler Beus; Daryl Wein
- Edited by: Spencer Rollins; Daryl Wein
- Release date: January 19, 2018 (Sundance)
- Running time: 71 minutes
- Country: United States
- Language: English

White Rabbit is a 2018 American comedy-drama film directed by Daryl Wein and starring Vivian Bang.

== Cast ==
- Vivian Bang
- Nana Ghana
- Nico Evers-Swindell
- Tracy Hazas as Actress
- Elizabeth Sung
- Michelle Sui

== Reception ==
The film has an 88% rating on Rotten Tomatoes based on 8 reviews. Nick Allen of RogerEbert.com awarded the film three stars.
