= Lola Versus =

- Theatrical release poster
- Directed by: Daryl Wein
- Written by: Daryl Wein; Zoe Lister-Jones
- Produced by: Jocelyn Hayes; Michael London
- Starring: Greta Gerwig; Joel Kinnaman; Zoe Lister-Jones; Bill Pullman; Debra Winger
- Cinematography: Jakob Ihre
- Edited by: Suzy Elmiger; Susan Littenberg
- Music by: Fall On Your Sword
- Production company: Groundswell Productions
- Distributed by: Fox Searchlight Pictures
- Release dates: April 24, 2012 (Tribeca Film Festival); June 8, 2012 (United States)
- Running time: 87 minutes
- Country: United States
- Language: English
- Box office: $455,754

Lola Versus is a 2012 American romantic comedy film directed by Daryl Wein, who co-wrote the screenplay with his partner Zoe Lister-Jones. The film stars Greta Gerwig, Joel Kinnaman, Lister-Jones, Bill Pullman and Debra Winger.

== Plot ==
On her 29th birthday, Ph.D. student Lola accepts a marriage proposal from her longtime artist boyfriend, Luke, and wedding preparations commence. However, weeks before the wedding, Luke loses his nerve and ends the engagement, devastating Lola.

In an attempt to encourage Lola to date other men, her best friend Alice takes her to a nightclub. There, the thought of having one-night stands with strangers sends Lola into a panic attack. Shortly thereafter, Lola visits Henry, a mutual friend of hers and Luke's, and spends the night at his place.

One day, a man named Nick flirts with Lola outside a fish market. Though she is not ready to start dating again, she agrees to take his phone number. On her way to a meeting at her university, Lola is surprised by Luke, who has been second-guessing his decision to cancel the wedding, but she rebuffs him. Lola presents her doctoral dissertation on silence in 19th-century French literature and the lack thereof in modern popular culture, as her professors look on in confusion.

One night, Lola asks Henry to stay over at her place. The two share her bed and eventually kiss, but Henry stops out of respect for Luke. Despite confessing he has always had feelings for Lola, Henry proposes they take things slow. The next day, Lola meets Luke for lunch. After they have sex at Luke's apartment, Lola breaks down in tears and insists she can no longer see him, as she is still heartbroken. While Luke is in the shower, Lola sees text messages from a woman named Peggy on his phone.

Lola and Henry continue to spend time together. While watching Henry perform with his band one night, Lola runs into Luke and Peggy. Outside the venue, Luke tells Lola he has recently started a casual relationship with Peggy. Angered, Lola reminds him that he was the one that wanted time alone, before abruptly revealing she is dating Henry. Back inside, Luke, feeling betrayed, lashes out at both Lola and Henry. Later that night, an intoxicated Lola goes over to Henry's, where they have awkward sex. Afterwards, Henry asserts they do not need to define their relationship.

Lola meets Nick for a dinner date at his place. They later have sex, during which Nick behaves oddly. The next morning, Nick accompanies Lola home. Henry, who had been waiting for Lola on her doorstep, becomes upset upon seeing her with Nick. Lola attempts to apologize to Henry, saying she was unsure if their relationship was exclusive, but he angrily leaves. Lola visits Luke's apartment, where they spend time together and smoke cannabis.

At a house party thrown by Lola, Henry assures her that he is no longer upset with her, while Luke tells her that Henry will move in with him and invites her to their upcoming housewarming party. Some time later, Lola breaks up with Nick. At the housewarming party, Alice and Henry awkwardly reveal to Lola that they have recently started dating. A hysterical Lola berates Alice for not telling her earlier. When Luke joins the conversation, Lola declares that all three of them have abandoned her. Storming off, she wanders the streets at night on a drunken bender, stealing liquor bottles and going to a strip club. The next morning, she awakens outside her apartment.

Realizing she is the only one responsible for her existential crisis, Lola decides to focus on her own self-improvement. She also completes her dissertation. Having made peace with both Alice and Henry, Lola celebrates her 30th birthday with a picnic in the park with her parents and close friends. When Luke appears, he tells Lola that their time apart has helped him realize how much he misses her, and he suggests a reconciliation. Lola kindly rejects his offer, explaining that since she spent all that time obsessing about him, she still needs to be alone for a while.

== Cast ==
- Greta Gerwig as Lola
- Joel Kinnaman as Luke
- Zoe Lister-Jones as Alice
- Bill Pullman as Lenny
- Debra Winger as Robin
- Hamish Linklater as Henry
- Ebon Moss-Bachrach as Nick
- Cheyenne Jackson as Roger
- Jay Pharoah as Randy
- Parisa Fitz-Henley as Peggy
- Adriane Lenox as Professor
- Maria Dizzia as woman subletter

== Reception ==
Lola Versus received mostly mixed reviews. On Rotten Tomatoes, the film holds an approval rating of 35% based on 82 reviews, with an average rating of 5.19/10. The site's critics consensus reads: "It's fun to see Greta Gerwig mature her acting career but Lola Versus – with its unpleasant characters and completely familiar script – does not succeed as her first major leading role." On Metacritic, the film has a weighted average score of 49 out of 100, based on 27 critics, indicating "mixed or average" reviews.
