= Peter Duchan =

American playwright and screenwriter

Peter Duchan is an American playwright and screenwriter, best known for the film Breaking Upwards and the musical Dogfight. He was also personal assistant to actor-director-producer Bob Balaban. He graduated from Northwestern University, where he participated in the Creative Writing for Media Program.

== Breaking Upwards ==
He was Associate Producer of Breaking Upwards, which he co-wrote with director Daryl Wein and actress Zoe-Lister Jones. The film premiered at the SXSW Film Festival (March, 2009) and was released in theaters by IFC Films on April 2, 2010. His short film Unlocked, also a collaboration with Wein, was an Official Selection of numerous festivals, including the Gijón International Film Festival in 2006 and the Tribeca Film Festival in 2007.

== Dogfight ==
He wrote the book of the stage musical adaptation of Dogfight, Nancy Savoca's 1991 film starring River Phoenix and Lili Taylor. The musical, featuring a score by the team, Pasek and Paul, premiered Off-Broadway at Second Stage Theatre on July 16, 2012, after previews from June 27. It was directed by Joe Mantello and choreographed by Christopher Gattelli.

The production earned two 2013 Lucille Lortel Awards for Outstanding Musical and Outstanding Choreographer (Christopher Gattelli). It was nominated for five 2013 Outer Critics Circle Awards, including Outstanding New Off-Broadway Musical and Outstanding Book of a Musical. Additionally, the show was nominated for Drama League Awards for Outstanding Production of a Broadway or Off-Broadway Musical and Distinguished Performance (Lindsay Mendez), as well as the Drama Desk Award for Outstanding Actress in a Musical (Lindsay Mendez). During its development, the musical was the recipient of the 2011 Richard Rodgers Award for Musical Theater given by the American Academy of Arts and Letters.
