= Breaking Upwards =

- Theatrical release poster
- Directed by: Daryl Wein
- Screenplay by: Peter Duchan; Daryl Wein; Zoe Lister-Jones
- Produced by: Daryl Wein; Zoe Lister-Jones
- Starring: Zoe Lister-Jones; Daryl Wein; Julie White; Peter Friedman; Andrea Martin; Pablo Schreiber
- Cinematography: Alex Bergman
- Edited by: Daryl Wein
- Music by: Kyle Forester
- Production company: Mister Lister
- Distributed by: IFC Films
- Release dates: March 14, 2009 (SXSW); April 2, 2010 (United States)
- Running time: 88 minutes
- Country: United States
- Language: English
- Budget: $15,000
- Box office: $77,389 (United States)

Breaking Upwards is a 2009 American romantic comedy-drama film directed by Daryl Wein, starring Zoe Lister-Jones, Wein, Julie White, Peter Friedman, Andrea Martin, and Pablo Schreiber. It explores a 20-something, real-life New York couple battling codependency who intricately strategize their own break-up. Cited as an example of independent film industry sweat equity, the film was shot in Manhattan and Brooklyn on a $15,000 budget. It premiered at the SXSW Film Festival on March 14, 2009, and was released simultaneously at New York City's IFC Center and via video on demand on April 2, 2010.

== Cast ==
- Zoe Lister-Jones as Zoe
- Daryl Wein as Daryl
- Julie White as Joanie
- Andrea Martin as Helaine
- Peter Friedman as Alan
- LaChanze as Maggie
- Ebon Moss-Bachrach as Dylan
- Olivia Thirlby as Erika
- Pablo Schreiber as Turner
- Heather Burns as Hannah
- Tate Ellington as Brian
- Francis Benhamou as Lindsay
- David Call as David
- Sam Rosen as Jack
- Max Jenkins as Frosh
- Michael Benjamin as Polyamorist
- Will Frears as Will
- Matthew Gregory as Polyamorist
- Shira Gregory as Polyamorist
- Ray Iannicelli
- Sondra James
- Ashley Lambert as Yoga Girl
- Charles Socarides as Nikkos
- Michael Warner as Michael
- Audrey Wauchope as Audrey Alison, Waitress

== Festival screenings ==
- South by Southwest Film Festival (USA; March 2009)
- Brooklyn International Film Festival (USA; June 5, 2009)
- Athens Film Festival (under title, Doseis horismou) (Greece; September 19, 2009)
- Titanic International Filmpresence Festival (under title, Szép kis szakítás) (Hungary; April 11, 2010)
- Leiden International Film Festival (Netherlands; October 26, 2010)
