= Vivian Bang =

American actress (born 1973)

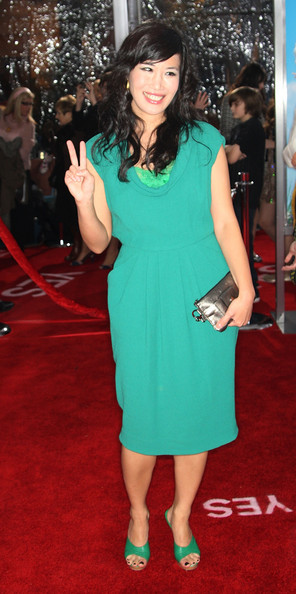
- Bang at the premiere of Yes Man in 2008
- Born: October 23, 1973 (age 52); Seoul, South Korea
- Education: New York University
- Occupation: Actor
- Years active: 2000–present
- Website: vivianbang.com

Vivian Bang (born October 23, 1973) is an American actress. She was a main cast member on television shows Sullivan & Son and Swedish Dicks. She had notable minor film roles as a bridal shower planner in Yes Man (2008) and the hippie girlfriend in Always Be My Maybe (2019).

Her film White Rabbit, directed by Daryl Wein, premiered at Sundance Film Festival in 2018.

== Early life ==
Born in Seoul, South Korea, Bang's family first moved to San Francisco in 1980 before settling down in Atlanta, Georgia. Bang graduated from Dunwoody High School.

She studied experimental theater/performance art at New York University's (NYU) Tisch School of the Arts. She graduated with a BFA in acting in 1996.

== Career ==
=== Film and television ===
She was awarded Best Actress for the Asian American Film Lab short film Elizabeth Ong Is Missing.

Bang played Steve Byrne's sister on the TBS sitcom Sullivan & Son.

Bang took on the leading role in the film White Rabbit, which she co-wrote and co-produced with director Daryl Wein. The film is about a struggling performance artist (Bang) navigating Los Angeles while financially supporting herself using the eponymous freelancing app, TaskRabbit. It premiered at the 2018 Sundance Film Festival as part of the out-of-competition NEXT lineup and was later acquired by Gravitas Ventures.

=== Theater ===
After graduation, she toured with the Big Art Group, an experimental performance troupe.

Her theater credits include roles in Velina Hasu Houston's Calling Aphrodite, Please Stand By with Thumping Claw, Big Art Group's Shelf-Life, Flicker, and the Obie-nominated Benton Kozo.

== Filmography ==
=== Film ===
Year	Title	Role	Notes
1997	Henry Fool	Teenager	
2000	Useless		Short film
2001	The Mitten		Short film
2003	Robot Stories	Receptionist	
2004	Little Black Book	Katie	
2004	Our Time Is Up	Soo-Mi	Short film
2008	Cute Couple		Short film
2008	Yes Man	Germ-Phobic Woman	
2009	Time's [Not] Up		Short film
2010	Jeffie Was Here		
2010	The Talking Head		Short film
2011	Coming & Going		
2011	Boy Toy		
2011	A Holiday Heist		
2013	Slightly Single in L.A.		
2014	Someone Marry Barry		
2014	Sleepover LA		Short film
2014	If You Lived Here You'd Be Home Already		Short film
2018	White Rabbit		
2018	We the Coyotes		
2019	Always Be My Maybe	Jenny	
2020	Runt	Kathy	
2025	The Parenting	Sara	

=== Television ===
Year	Title	Role	Notes
2000	The Corner		1 episode
2000	Sex and the City		1 episode
2003	Becker		1 episode
2005	House		1 episode
2006	Monk		1 episode
2006	How I Met Your Mother		1 episode
2008	Outsourced		
2009	Kath & Kim		2 episodes
2009	Numb3rs		1 episode
2009	iCarly		1 episode
2009	Medium		1 episode
2009–2010	Better Off Ted		3 episodes
2010	ACME Hollywood Dream Role		1 episode
2010	The LXD: The Legion of Extraordinary Dancers		1 episode
2010	Ktown Cowboys		1 episode
2011	Retired at 35		1 episode
2011	Mythomania		4 episodes
2011	Matumbo Goldberg		5 episodes
2012–2014	Sullivan & Son		
2013	Status Updates		9 episodes
2014	Almost Asian		1 episode
2016–2017	Swedish Dicks		
