= Always Be My Maybe =

2019 film by Nahnatchka Khan

- Release poster
- Directed by: Nahnatchka Khan
- Written by: Randall Park; Ali Wong; Michael Golamco
- Produced by: Nathan Kahane; Erin Westerman; Randall Park; Ali Wong
- Starring: Ali Wong; Randall Park; James Saito; Michelle Buteau; Vivian Bang; Daniel Dae Kim; Keanu Reeves
- Cinematography: Tim Suhrstedt
- Edited by: Lee Haxall
- Music by: Michael Andrews; Greyboy
- Production company: Good Universe
- Distributed by: Netflix
- Release date: May 29, 2019
- Running time: 102 minutes
- Country: United States
- Language: English

Always Be My Maybe is a 2019 American romantic comedy film, written by Ali Wong, Randall Park and Michael Golamco and directed by Nahnatchka Khan. It stars Park and Wong as childhood friends Marcus and Sasha, who have not been in touch since a brief teenage fling ended badly. When Sasha returns to San Francisco to open a restaurant and romantic chemistry from their teenager years remains, Marcus' fears and Sasha's fame and demanding career challenge their potential new relationship. James Saito, Michelle Buteau, Vivian Bang, Daniel Dae Kim and Keanu Reeves also star.

The film was released in select theaters on May 29, 2019, and on Netflix on May 31, 2019.

== Plot ==
In 1996, Sasha Tran and Marcus Kim are childhood friends who grow up next door to each other in San Francisco. As Sasha's Vietnamese parents regularly leave her home alone while they tend to their store, Marcus' parents often have her over for dinner, and Marcus' Korean-American mother Judy teaches her to cook.

By 2003, Sasha and Marcus form a close friendship that carries on into their teenage years, but it is broken after his mother dies in an accident. Grieving, the two have sex but a wedge is driven between them when they argue shortly afterwards and they fall out of touch.

Sixteen years later in 2019, Sasha is a celebrity chef and engaged to Brandon Choi, a successful restaurateur. Marcus is still in San Francisco living with his widowed father and performs in a talented but largely unsuccessful band that only plays in his neighborhood. He also has a girlfriend Jenny, an Asian American woman with dreadlocks. Sasha breaks up with Brandon after he delays their wedding yet again. Briefly moving back to the Bay Area to oversee the opening of a new restaurant, she has a chance encounter with Marcus when he and his father are hired to install air conditioning at her temporary home.

After initial friction, they reconnect and become friends again, and Marcus admits to his father he still has feelings for Sasha. But before he can tell her, Sasha announces she has met someone new, and they wind up on a disastrous double date with Marcus' girlfriend and Sasha's new love interest: movie star Keanu Reeves. The long evening ultimately dissolves into chaos as Sasha confesses her longtime childhood crush on Marcus, a brawl breaks out between Marcus and Keanu, and Jenny ends up staying with Keanu for the night. Afterwards Marcus and Sasha have sex.

Sasha and Marcus then begin seeing each other, with Marcus reacquainting Sasha with the home and San Francisco Asian community she had distanced herself from, still harboring resentment of her absentee parents. He takes her to an old favorite Cantonese restaurant from their childhood, which Sasha remembers as terrible but discovers is delicious, marred only by her painful memories.

As Sasha reconnects to the city and the two fall in love, Marcus is taken aback to learn that, as planned, she still intends to move on to New York for her next project, once the San Francisco restaurant has launched. When Sasha asks Marcus to join her, he refuses and she leaves San Francisco alone.

Taken to task by both his father and his bandmates, Marcus realizes that his mother's death has made him scared to move on in life. He then moves out of his childhood home and takes steps to make his band more successful. He calls Sasha regularly with updates but, not receiving any reply, does not pursue her further until he discovers she is secretly supporting his musical ambitions. This emboldens Marcus to surprise Sasha on the red carpet at an awards show in Manhattan, asking for her to take him back and pledging to be wherever she is. She accepts. Reunited, Sasha takes Marcus to the New York restaurant she has been developing: it is named for and features Judy's recipes.

== Cast ==
- Ali Wong as Sasha Tran
  - Miya Cech as 12-year-old Sasha
  - Ashley Liao as 14/16-year-old Sasha
- Randall Park as Marcus Kim
  - Emerson Min as 12-year-old Marcus
  - Jackson Geach as 14/16-year-old Marcus
- James Saito as Harry Kim
- Michelle Buteau as Veronica
  - Anaiyah Bernier as 16-year-old Veronica
- Vivian Bang as Jenny
- Karan Soni as Tony
- Lo Mutuc (Note: Credited as Charlyne Yi) as Ginger
- Susan Park as Judy Kim
- Daniel Dae Kim as Brandon Choi
- Keanu Reeves as himself
- Lyrics Born as Quasar
- Casey Wilson as Chloe
- Raymond Ma as Quoc Tran
- Peggy Lu as Sandy Tran
- Peter New as Goat Guy

== Production ==
=== Development and casting ===
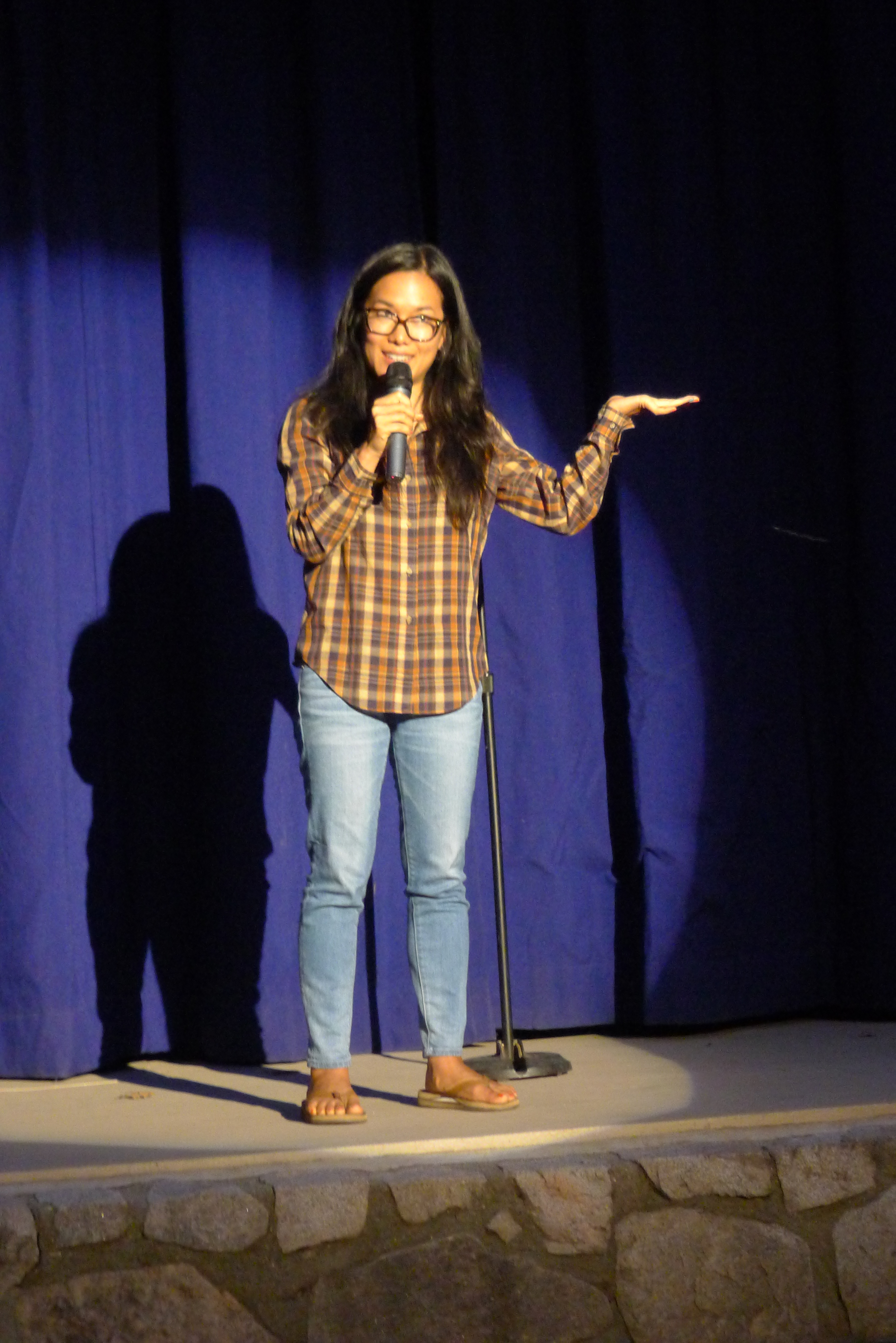
Wong performing in 2013

Ali Wong and Randall Park met in the late 1990s during a "fried-rice cooking competition hosted by a mutual friend from the LCC Theatre Company, an Asian American performance group Park co-founded while attending UCLA." Park and Wong stayed in touch and remained close friends and supportive of each other's projects.

In 2016, Wong mentioned in a New Yorker interview that she and Park had been working for years to develop "our version of When Harry Met Sally...". Vulture's Jackson McHenry wrote a column in enthusiastic support of the project with the headline, "Dear Hollywood, Please Make Ali Wong and Randall Park's Dream Rom-Com." The project picked up steam and in August 2017, Netflix announced it had green-lit an untitled film written by Wong, Park and Michael Golamco, with the former set to costar in the film. In March 2018, Nahnatchka Khan was announced as attached in her directorial debut, with principal photography to begin in Vancouver and San Francisco in May 2018. In May 2018, Keanu Reeves, Daniel Dae Kim, Michelle Buteau, Vivian Bang, Karan Soni, Lo Mutac, James Saito, Lyrics Born, and Susan Park joined the cast of the film, titled Always Be My Maybe.

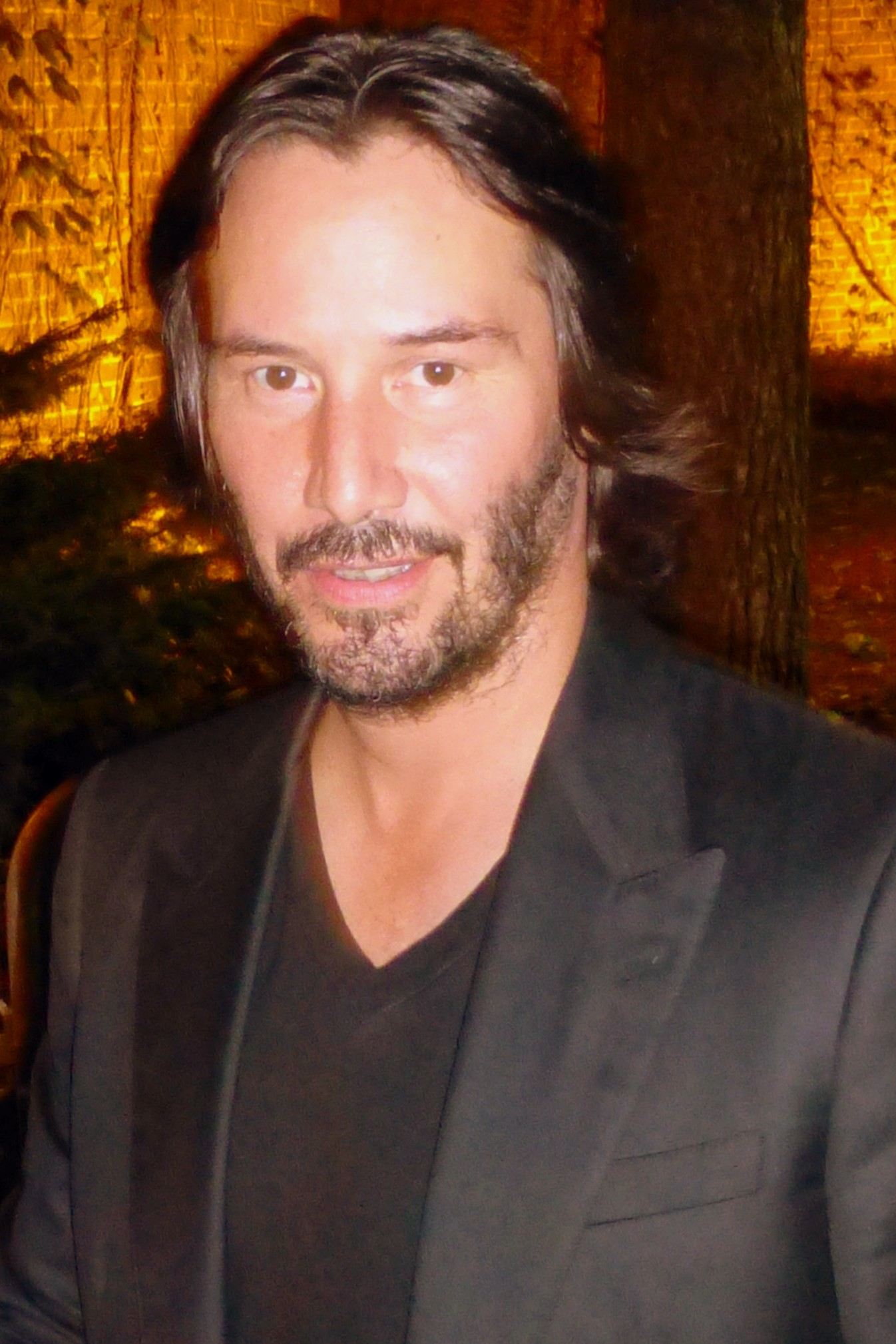
Keanu Reeves was the first choice for Wong's celebrity love interest in the film

Reeves's casting was initially thought to be a pipe dream. "He's the dream guy," said Khan. "Like, we don't know what his schedule is, but this would be amazing." "We all thought it was going to be impossible to get him," said Park. "What was the likelihood of him being available, and then also him being willing to play himself? So let's try to think of other people that we could get." Alternatives to Reeves included Tony Leung, Mark Dacascos, M. Night Shyamalan and Paul Giamatti. Reeves, a big fan of Wong's stand-up, was on-board from the start and found a way to shoot his scene around his schedule. "He was like, 'I would be honored to be part of this love story,'" Khan said.

Reeves went over the script with Wong and Khan at the Chateau Marmont in Los Angeles. "He pitched a couple of things that made it in. Like wearing glasses that had no lens," Wong noted. "And the part in the game night scene where he lists all of these Chinese dignitaries, that was all his idea. And when he says, 'I don't have a problem, Sasha. What's your problem?' and starts air-fighting. It's hard to describe just how shockingly funny he is."

=== Filming ===
Principal photography began on May 30, 2018, in Vancouver. Additional filming took place in San Francisco from July 15 to 26, 2018. Reeves, who was in the middle of filming John Wick: Chapter 3 – Parabellum, flew into the city specifically to shoot his two scenes before returning to New York.

=== Music ===
Park's rap persona in the film is based on his earlier music career as a member of the 1990s Bay Area hip-hop group called Ill Again. The fictional band Hello Peril is a play on the term "yellow peril"—the "alleged threat to Western nations by East Asians". Rapper Lyrics Born appears as a band member. Park co-wrote several rap songs for the movie with hip-hop producer Dan the Automator. The song "I Punched Keanu Reeves" which plays in the end credits, was written by Park as "a tribute to Keanu, because he's such a big part of all our lives and because he actually agreed to be in our movie." Park had to get Reeves's permission for the song. "I sent him an email with some of the lyrics and asked if it would be OK, and he was totally down," Park said. "He even gave some suggestions."

The film's title is a play-on-words of the title of Mariah Carey's 1996 song "Always Be My Baby".

== Release ==
Always Be My Maybe was released in select theaters in the United States on May 29, 2019, and on Netflix on May 31, 2019.

In July 2019, Netflix reported that the film was viewed by 32 million households in its first four weeks of release.

== Reception ==
=== Critical response ===
On Rotten Tomatoes, the film has an approval rating of 89% based on 100 reviews, with an average rating of 7.1/10. The site's critical consensus reads, "Carried by the infectious charms of Ali Wong and Randall Park, Always Be My Maybe takes familiar rom-com beats and cleverly layers in smart social commentary to find its own sweet groove." On Metacritic, the film has a weighted average score of 64 out of 100, based on reviews from 20 critics, indicating "generally favorable" reviews.

Courtney Howard of Variety wrote: "Perhaps the best sequences are multi-purpose. They're both funny and genuine, add a bubbly buoyancy through deft wit and charm, and tweak genre conventions." Peter Travers of Rolling Stone called it "an irresistible romantic romp that turns the familiar into something sweet, sassy and laugh-out-loud funny." Beandrea July of The Hollywood Reporter gave it a mixed review, and wrote: "In shouldering the weight of representing Asian love Always Be My Maybe doesn't quite allow its capable leads to do what has made them stars: just be themselves."

=== Accolades ===
Always Be My Maybe was nominated at the 2019 People's Choice Awards for "The Comedy Movie Star of 2019 - Ali Wong". Randall Park and Dan the Automator were nominated in the category for "Best Original Song - I Punched Keanu Reeves" by the 2019 Houston Film Critics Society Awards, but won the award at the 2019 Chicago Indie Awards.
