= Bill Jones (artist) =

American photographer and artist

Bill Jones is a photographer, installation artist, performer and writer living in Los Angeles, CA. His work is concerned with light as both a physical phenomenon and a metaphorical figure. Jones was part of the Vancouver School of conceptual photography, along with such artists as Rodney Graham, Ian Wallace and Jeff Wall. Jones has three daughters; his youngest daughter (with New York-based, Canadian-born video artist Ardele Lister) is actress and screenwriter Zoe Lister-Jones. He is married to visual artist and writer Joy Garnett.

== Biography ==
Bill Jones' work has been shown in the United States, Canada and elsewhere, including a mid-career retrospective, "Bill Jones: 10 Years of Multiple-Image Narratives," at the International Center of Photography, NY; P.S.1 Contemporary Art Center, LIC, NY; Exit Art, NY; Brooklyn Museum; Vancouver Art Gallery; Jewish Museum, NY; Rotunda Gallery, Brooklyn, NY; Sandra Gering Gallery, NY; Lombard-Freid, NY; Amy Lipton Gallery, NY; White Columns, NY; Paul Petro Gallery, Toronto, ONT; San Francisco Museum of Modern Art; High Museum of Art, Atlanta; Milwaukee Art Museum; Musée National d'Art Moderne, Paris; Kettle's Yard, Cambridge, UK.

Jones' 2003 exhibition "Nite Nite" at Sandra Gering Gallery with musician collaborator Ben Neill started a new development of MIDI-controlled video, whereby performed elements of sampled video are "played" by both VJ and musician. Their collaborations include Palladio, an interactive, playable movie based on the novel by Jonathan Dee that premiered in Glasgow's New Territories Festival and in New York City at Symphony Space (Leonard Nimoy Thalia Theater) in February and March respectively, 2005. Jones' work was also featured in Playvision at the World Financial Center in the Spring of 2006.

Jones' table installation, "Elevations Levitations and the Twist," which was shown at Toronto's A Space in 1974 and is now in the permanent collection of The Art Gallery of Ontario, was presented in the reopening exhibitions of the new Frank Gehry-designed AGO in November 2008.

Jones created "Night Science," a set of interactive video for music composed by long-time collaborator Ben Neill. The primarily black and white imagery evokes a noirish urban vibe inspired by sci-fi noir films such as Jean-Luc Godard's Alphaville. Jones and Neill performed this work live at the Galapagos Art Space in DUMBO, Brooklyn, NY in September 2009 for the Night Science record release party.

Jones' 1971 photo-conceptual piece, "Landscape #1" was included in the traveling exhibition "Traffic: Conceptual Art in Canada c. 1965 to 1980" (2010-2012), the first major account of the development of Conceptual Art in Canada from the mid-1960s to the early 1980s, curated by Grant Arnold, Catherine Crowston, Barbara Fischer, Michèle Thériault with Vincent Bonin, and Jayne Wark. Traffic was organized by the Art Gallery of Alberta, Justina M. Barnicke Gallery (Hart House) and the Vancouver Art Gallery, in partnership with the Leonard and Bina Ellen Art Gallery (Concordia University), Halifax, INK with the support of the University of Toronto Art Centre, Blackwood Gallery, and Doris McCarthy Gallery.

Previously the managing editor of Arts Magazine, Jones conceived and founded Artbyte: The Magazine of Digital Culture in 1998, which he edited for its first two years. He has collaborated with electro-chemist and cancer researcher Merrill Garnett since the publication First Pulse: A Personal Journey in Cancer Research.

Jones is a convert to Judaism.
