= Nature Noir =

Studio album by Crystal Stilts
- Released: September 16, 2013 (UK); September 17, 2013 (US)
- Genre: Noise pop; neo-psychedelia; post-punk; shoegaze
- Length: 33:34
- Label: Sacred Bones
- Producer: JB Townsend

Crystal Stilts chronology
In Love with Oblivion (2011)	Nature Noir (2013)

Singles from Nature Noir
- 1. "Star Crawl" Released: 2013; 2. "Future Folklore" Released: 2013

Professional ratings
Aggregate scores
Source	Rating
Metacritic	(73/100)
Review scores
Source	Rating
AllMusic	4/5 stars
NME	(8/10)
Impact	4.5/5 stars
Blurt Magazine	4/5 stars
EMusic	4/5 stars
This is Fake DIY	(7/10)
Loud and Quiet	(8/10)
Uncut	(7/10)
The Fly	4/5 stars
The List	4/5 stars

Nature Noir is the third studio album by Brooklyn-based band Crystal Stilts, which was released on September 16, 2013 in the UK and September 17 in the US. The album is the follow-up to 2011's In Love with Oblivion and 2008's debut Alight of Night.

== Reception ==
Though met with slightly less fanfare than their first two records, the album was still received warmly by critics, many of whom praised the refinement of the bands songcraft. Again, Tim Sendra of the AllMusic Guide praised the bands evolution. He noted the "shocking amount of refurb the group did... most everywhere you look there's something happening sonically that's not happened on a Crystal Stilts record before," after earlier declaring that, "Crystal Stilts have staked out a place as perhaps the foremost purveyors of dark psychedelic pop their generation has to offer." Impact called it, "their most complete effort yet; a stunning combination of 60s psychedelia, 80s post-punk and timeless noise-pop," while Doug Mosurock, after pronouncing them "the coolest '60s throwback NYC's known in some time," summed up Nature Noir as "Truly beautiful stuff from a group that only improves with each move." Dean Wareham of Luna and Galaxie 500 fame said after hearing Nature Noir, "I’ve loved Crystal Stilts from their first EP and they only get better... at this point they sound only like Crystal Stilts — and are themselves objects of imitation by bands from across the pond."

The Fly ranked Nature Noir as the No. 44 album of 2013.

== Track listing ==
1. "Spirit in Front of Me" – 4:13
2. "Star Crawl" – 3:46
3. "Future Folklore" – 2:34
4. "Sticks & Stones" – 2:35
5. "Memory Room" – 3:37
6. "Worlds Gone Weird" – 2:49
7. "Darken the Door" – 3:51
8. "Electrons Rising" – 3:03
9. "Nature Noir" – 2:48
10. "Phases Forever" – 4:18

== Personnel ==
- Brad Hargett – vocals
- JB Townsend – guitar, producer
- Kyle Forester – keyboards
- Andy Adler – bass guitar
- Keegan Cooke – drums
- Al Carlson, Davey Jewell, Josh Bonati – recording, mastering, mixing
- New Day – cover art
