= How It Ends (2021 film) =

2021 American apocalyptic comedy-drama film

- Official poster
- Directed by: Daryl Wein; Zoe Lister-Jones
- Written by: Daryl Wein; Zoe Lister-Jones
- Produced by: Daryl Wein; Zoe Lister-Jones
- Starring: Zoe Lister-Jones; Cailee Spaeny; Helen Hunt; Olivia Wilde; Fred Armisen; Lamorne Morris; Nick Kroll
- Cinematography: Daryl Wein; Tyler Beus
- Edited by: Daryl Wein; Libby Cuenin
- Music by: Ryan Miller
- Production company: Mister Lister Films
- Distributed by: American International Pictures (through United Artists Releasing)
- Release dates: January 29, 2021 (Sundance); July 20, 2021 (United States)
- Running time: 82 minutes
- Country: United States
- Language: English
- Box office: $16,104

How It Ends is a 2021 American apocalyptic comedy-drama film written, directed, and produced by Daryl Wein and Zoe Lister-Jones. It stars Lister-Jones and Cailee Spaeny, with cameo appearances by 23 others in a series of vignettes, facilitating the reality of 2020 COVID-19 protocols while serving the underlying plot device of walking through the deserted streets of Los Angeles.

The film had its world premiere at the 2021 Sundance Film Festival on January 29, 2021, and was released in the United States on July 20, 2021, by United Artists Releasing.

== Plot summary ==
On the last full day before a meteor arrives on its collision course with Earth, Liza takes stock of her life through a conversation with her "metaphysical" childhood self. The conversation carries through as they walk through the empty streets of Los Angeles to their cousin Mandy's End of the World Party. As they walk, they have short interactions with numerous individuals, including the metaphysical YS of others – the Younger Selves who are now visible due to certain doom having elevated everyone's awareness. The Lizas also stop to visit some family and friends that they want to see before the end.

== Cast ==
- Zoe Lister-Jones as Liza
  - Cailee Spaeny as Little Liza
- Whitney Cummings as Mandy (Liza's friend)
- Tawny Newsome as Celine (Liza's friend)
- Finn Wolfhard as Ezra (the Lizas' cousin)
- Nick Kroll as Gary (the drug buyer)
- Logan Marshall-Green as Nate (the ex Liza still loves)
- Bobby Lee as Derek (Liza's neighbor)
- Fred Armisen as Manny (YS version)
- Glenn Howerton as John (the car thief)
- Bradley Whitford as Kenny (the Lizas' father)
- Ayo Edebiri as Stand Up (the teacher)
- Sharon Van Etten as Jet (the busker)
- Olivia Wilde as Alay (Liza's long avoided friend)
- Paul W. Downs as Sal (the Lizas' childhood first kiss)
- Raymond Cham Jr. as Breakdancer
- Lamorne Morris as Larry (Liza's bad ex)
- Angelique Cabral as Diaz (another Larry ex)
- Rob Huebel as Joe (Dave's neighbor)
- Paul Scheer as Dave (Joe's neighbor)
- Helen Hunt as Lucinda (the Lizas' mother)
- Colin Hanks as Charlie (the scavenger hunter)
- Charlie Day as Lonny (Krista's guy)
- Mary Elizabeth Ellis as Krista (Lonny's gal)
- Pauly Shore as Himself

== Production ==
Wein and Zoe Lister-Jones reached out to numerous actor friends, and even some actors they did not know, to say "If you’re interested in starting to step outdoors in whatever fashion that may be and however energetically, we’ll meet you halfway." The couple felt that their years of experience working a free form style together helped facilitate doing so with such a large and diverse cast, over a series of numerous vignettes.

The film was shot and completed in Los Angeles, California, during the COVID-19 pandemic.

== Release ==
The film had its world premiere at the 2021 Sundance Film Festival on January 29, 2021. It was also scheduled to screen at South by Southwest in March 2021, which ended up being a virtual SXSW festival as the COVID-19 pandemic in Austin remained troubling. In May 2021, American International Pictures acquired worldwide distribution rights to the film, and set it for a release in the United States on July 20, 2021. However, subsequent worldwide waves extended the COVID-19 pandemic through 2021, and the film was released through video-on-demand and streaming services.

== Critical response ==
On Rotten Tomatoes, the film has an approval rating of 69% based on reviews from 78 critics, with an average rating of 6/10. The critics consensus reads: "It can feel more like a collection of skits than a cohesive story, but How It Ends is a comedic vision of the apocalypse with fleeting moments of brilliance." On Metacritic, the film has a weighted average score of 57 out of 100, based on 17 critics, indicating "mixed or average" reviews.

Writing in RogerEbert.com, critic Peter Sobczynski described the film as "a tedious exercise in half-baked whimsy," that "attitude is the only thing the film really has to offer to viewers," and that "although there are a few amusing moments here and there, the comedic situations are too droll for their own good and too often seem to waste potentially interesting ideas." Chris Barsanti wrote in Slant Magazine that "the film’s chill and even-tempered approach to the incredible, which allows for some quietly witty moments, is impressively sustained," but that it "is more committed to [...] individual moments than any dramatic through line." James Scott described the film in The Austin Chronicle as "more in twain than cohered [and that] much of the film fails to create sparks, with romantic B plots, jokes, and even the story resolution of the once-stolen car being returned all smudging off each other like damp matches," but noted that "the film succeeds most in the simplicity of Liza and her younger self as they navigate the tension of finding balance and acceptance of the entire self."
