= Julian Grey =

American actor

- Julian Grey in October 2026
- Born: Los Angeles, California
- Occupation: Actor
- Years active: 2014–present
- Website: itsjuliangrey.com

Julian Grey is an American actor. He stars as PJ, the youngest of the De Angelis siblings, in the upcoming HBO Max series How To Survive Without Me, alongside Ray Romano, Kaley Cuoco, and Joshua Jackson. His film credits include The Matrix Resurrections (2021),The Craft: Legacy (2020), and Downhill (2020). On television, Grey has appeared in AMCs Fear the Walking Dead (2023), Netflix's limited series Godless (2017), and Fox's Wayward Pines (2016).

== Early Life ==
Grey was born in Los Angeles, California, to a German father and an American mother. He holds dual German and American citizenship. He has a twin sister, and an older brother.

== Career ==
Grey made his professional acting debut at age 10 in a 2016 episode of the Fox supernatural series Wayward Pines, opposite Melissa Leo. Later that year, he was cast in a recurring role in the Netflix western miniseries Godless (2017) appearing alongside Scoot McNairy and Merritt Wever.

In 2017, Grey was cast in the drama pilot, Crash & Burn, based on the Michael Hassan novel of the same name.

In 2019, Grey filmed the Searchlight Pictures dark comedy Downhill, in which he portrayed one of the sons of characters played by Will Ferrell and Julia Louis-Dreyfus. The film premiered at the Sundance Film Festival in January 2020 and was released theatrically the following month.

Later in 2019, Grey joined the cast of The Craft: Legacy, a continuation of the 1996 filmThe Craft. He portrayed Abe, the youngest of Adam Harrison (David Duchovny) and stepbrother of Lily (Cailee Spaeny). The film was released on premium video-on-demand in North America on October 28, 2020, and received a limited international theatrical release in select markets.

In 2020, Grey filmed The Matrix Resurrections, directed by Lana Wachowski. He portrayed Brandon, the teenage son of Tiffany / Trinity (Carrie-Anne Moss) and Chad (Chad Stahelski), and appeared in scenes with Keanu Reeves. After filming initial scenes in San Francisco, production was suspended in March 2020 due to the COVID-19 pandemic. It later resumed in Berlin under strict health protocols and wrapped in the fall of 2020. The Matrix Resurrections premiered at San Francisco's Castro Theatre on December 18, 2021, and was released in the United States on December 22, 2021, simultaneously in theaters and on HBO Max as part of Warner Bros.'s day-and-date release strategy.

In 2022, Grey joined the cast of Fear the Walking Dead for the second half of its eighth and final season. He portrayed Klaus, the adopted son of Victor Strand (Colman Domingo), and appeared in four episodes, including the series finale.

In April 2026, Grey was cast as series regular PJ De Angelis in the HBO Max family drama How To Survive Without Me. PJ is the youngest of the De Angelis siblings and lives at home with his widowed father Leo (Ray Romano). The pilot was written by Greg Berlanti and Bash Doran, from a story by Berlanti, Doran, and Robbie Rogers, and the series is produced by Warner Bros. Television. After the pilot was filmed, HBO Max ordered the series for 15 episodes in September 2026. The series stars Ray Romano, Kaley Cuoco, and Joshua Jackson with Rita Wilson, Julia Schlaepfer, Jack Ball, Kylar Miranda, and Grey, as members of the De Angelis family.

== Filmography ==
=== Film ===
film appearances
Year	Title	Role	Notes
2020	Downhill	Finn Stanton	
2020	The Craft: Legacy	Abe Harrison	
2021	The Matrix Resurrections	Brandon	

=== Television ===
Television appearances
Year	Title	Role	Notes
2016	Wayward Pines	Young Jason (age 10)	Episode "Once Upon a Time in Wayward Pines"
2017	Godless	William McNue	Recurring; 6 episodes
2017	Crash & Burn	Young Steve Newman	Pilot (unaired)
2023	Fear the Walking Dead	Klaus	Recurring guest star; 4 episodes
2026	How to Survive Without Me	PJ	Series Regular; 15-episode series
