= Electra (2024 film) =

Film by Hala Matar

- Theatrical release poster
- Directed by: Hala Matar
- Written by: Daryl Wein; Hala Matar; Paul Sado
- Produced by: Daryl Wein; Hala Matar; Jordan Beckerman; Jordan Yale Levine; Tommaso Bertani; Luca Cottafavi
- Starring: Maria Bakalova; Abigail Cowen; Jack Farthing; Daryl Wein
- Cinematography: Michael Alden Lloyd
- Edited by: Matt Berardi; Spencer Rollins
- Music by: Ali Helnwein
- Production companies: Sparling; Yale Entertainment; Ring Film; Vested Interest; Great Escape; Heavyweight
- Distributed by: Level 33 Entertainment
- Release dates: February 9, 2024 (SBIFF); May 2, 2025 (United States)
- Running time: 85 minutes
- Countries: United States; Italy
- Language: English

Electra is a 2024 thriller film directed by Hala Matar (in her feature film directorial debut), who co-wrote the screenplay with Daryl Wein and Paul Sado. The film stars Maria Bakalova, Abigail Cowen, Jack Farthing, and Daryl Wein. It premiered at the 39th Santa Barbara International Film Festival.

== Cast ==
- Maria Bakalova as Francesca
- Abigail Cowen as Lucy
- Jack Farthing as Milo Nix
- Daryl Wein as Dylan Andrews

== Production ==
The film is the feature-length debut of Hala Matar, the first Bahraini woman to make a feature film. It was written by Daryl Wein, Matar, and Paul Sado. Wein and Matar also produced the film with Jordan Yale Levine and Jordan Beckerman of Yale Productions, Tommaso Bertani of Ring Film, and Luca Cottafavi. The film, produced by Yale Entertainment, led by Levine and Beckerman, along with the Italian company Ring Film. The cast is led by Maria Bakalova, alongside Wein, Jack Farthing and Abigail Cowen.

Principal photography took place in Italy in September 2022. Filming lasted for three weeks. Filming locations included a fifteenth century palazzo.

== Release ==
Electra screened at film festivals in 2024 following its world premiere at the 39th Santa Barbara International Film Festival in February 2024. The film was released in the United States on May 2, 2025, by Level 33 Entertainment.

== Reception ==
The film won the Best Set Design award at the Ischian Festival.
