= Sex Positive =

- Theatrical release poster
- Directed by: Daryl Wein
- Produced by: David Oliver Cohen, Daryl Wein (producers), Zoe Lister Jones (associate producer)
- Starring: Richard Berkowitz
- Cinematography: Alex Bregman
- Edited by: Daryl Wein
- Music by: Michael Tremante
- Release date: 2008
- Running time: 75 minutes
- Country: United States
- Language: English

Sex Positive is a 2008 documentary film about Richard Berkowitz directed by Daryl Wein. The film explores Berkowitz's life, presenting him as a revolutionary gay activist whose incomparable contribution to the invention of safe sex has never been aptly credited.

The documentary had footages from Berkowitz, as well as Don Adler, Dotty Berkowitz (his mother), Susan Brown, Dr. Demetre Daskalakis, Richard Dworkin (actor and artist), William A. Haseltine, Larry Kramer, Ardele Lister, Michael Lucas, Francisco Roque (director of Gay Men's Health Crisis), Gabriel Rotello, Joseph Sonnabend, Dr. Bill Stackhouse GMHC Secretary, Krishna Stone (former GMHC director of community relations), Sean Strub and Edmund White.

In 2008, the film won the Grand Jury Award at the Los Angeles Outfest for "Best Documentary Feature".
