= Stuck Between Stations =

- US Theatrical Poster
- Directed by: Brady Kiernan
- Written by: Nat Bennett; Sam Rosen
- Produced by: Spencer Kiernan; Todd Cobery
- Starring: Josh Hartnett; Michael Imperioli; Zoe Lister Jones; Sam Rosen
- Cinematography: Bo Hakala
- Edited by: Sam Heyn
- Music by: Grant Cutler
- Production company: RKB Pictures
- Distributed by: Wrekin Hill Entertainment; NECA Films. (United States); Preferred Content (International)
- Release dates: April 22, 2011 (TFF); November 4, 2011 (New York); March 13, 2012 (DVD)
- Running time: 85 minutes
- Country: United States
- Language: English
- Budget: $20 million

Stuck Between Stations is a 2011 romantic drama film, directed by Brady Kiernan from a script by Nat Bennett and Sam Rosen. The film tells a coming-of-age story about former high school classmates reunited by chance during a chaotic party-filled evening.

Stuck Between Stations premiered as an official selection of the Viewpoints section at the SVA Theater at the 2011 Tribeca Film Festival in New York City, New York, U.S.A. A NYC theatrical release was slated in November 2011.

== Plot ==
A decade after they graduated from high school and went their separate ways, Casper (Sam Rosen), a soldier on bereavement leave from a tour in Afghanistan, and Rebecca (Zoe Lister Jones), a graduate student of comparative literature, reunite by chance and get to know each other over the course of an evening in Minneapolis. The evening includes a bar fight, a house party, a punk-rock circus, a spontaneous burglary, a home Casper did not know he had.

== Cast ==
- Sam Rosen as Casper, a young soldier on bereavement leave from a tour in Afghanistan for the funeral of his hippie-ish father.
- Zoe Lister Jones as 'Becky' Rebecca, graduate student of comparative literature and Casper's high school crush.
- Josh Hartnett as Paddy, a neck-tattooed sort-of-anarchist leader of a bicycle gang and frenemy of Casper's.
- Michael Imperioli as David, a college professor of dubious moral substance and Becky's lover and PhD advisor.
- Nadia Dajani as Sheila, the head of Becky's comparative literature department and David's possessive wife.

== Production ==
Stuck Between Stations is produced by Spencer Kiernan and Todd Cobery for RKB Pictures. The film was shot mainly in Minneapolis. Principal photography began on October 2, 2009.

It was the 2009 indie thriller Four Boxes through one of the actors of the film, Sam Rosen, that led Brady Kiernan to directing Stuck Between Stations. Rosen and his writing partner, Nat Bennett, were working on the screenplay for Stuck Between Stations and in March 2009 submitted it to Kiernan.

Stuck Between Stations is named after the opening track of The Hold Steady's Boys and Girls in America album. "The title [of the film] is mostly a reference to the spirit of the song," Kiernan revealed in a 2009 interview. "This film is about those nights that we've all had where you meet someone, spend the whole night with them and start to maybe fall in love."

On June 7, 2010 the Independent Feature Project (IFP), America's oldest and largest organization of independent filmmakers, announced that Stuck Between Stations was one of the ten projects selected for participation in its 2010’s narrative edition of their prestigious Independent Filmmaker Labs. The Independent Filmmaker Labs are a highly immersive free mentorship program for low-budget (< $1,000,000) first feature films which have shot all or a substantial amount of footage for their features but have not completed post-production. This program is supported by the Academy of Motion Picture Arts & Sciences, Hollywood Foreign Press Association, New York City Department of Cultural Affairs, New York State Council for the Arts, Newman's Own Foundation, SAGIndie and Time Warner. Lab partners include 92YTribeca, The Adrienne Shelly Foundation, BMI, Filmmaker Magazine, Deluxe Post New York, Rooftop Films, and The Workbook Project.

== Release ==
=== Festival screenings ===
| Event | Section | Location | Date(s) | Ref. |
|---|---|---|---|---|
| Tribeca Film Festival | Viewpoints | New York City, New York, United States | April 22, 2011 - April 25, 2011 - April 28, 2011 | |
| Minneapolis-St. Paul International Film Festival | Official Selection | Minneapolis, Minnesota, United States | May 5, 2011 | |
| New Hampshire Film Festival | Official Selection | Portsmouth, New Hampshire, United States | October 15, 2011 | |
| Austin Film Festival | Narrative Feature Competition | Austin, Texas, United States | October 20, 2011 - October 23, 2011 | |

=== Theatrical Release ===
Stuck Between Stations made its New York theatrical premiere at Brooklyn's ReRun Theater with a week-long run, starting November 4, 2011 to November 10, 2011. The film was also released in Minneapolis on December 16, 2011 at St. Anthony Main Theater and in Portland on February 17, 2012 at the Hollywood Theater. The film was made available on DVD and video-on-demand through Lionsgate on March 13, 2012.

== Reception ==
On the review aggregator website Rotten Tomatoes, 63% of 8 critics' reviews are positive, with an average rating of 4.9/10. Metacritic, which uses a weighted average, assigned the film a score of 67 out of 100, based on 4 critics, indicating "generally favorable" reviews.
