= Crystal Stilts EP =

Crystal Stilts

EP by Crystal Stilts
- Released: July 14, 2008
- Recorded: 2004–2005
- Genre: Noise pop, neo-psychedelia, post-punk
- Length: 23:12
- Label: Woodsist, Feathery Tongue

Crystal Stilts chronology
Crystal Stilts (2008)	Radiant Door (2011)

Professional ratings
Review scores
Source	Rating
Allmusic	4/5 stars
Pitchfork Media	(8.3/10)

Crystal Stilts EP is the first EP by the punk rock band Crystal Stilts. It was initially self-released in 2006 on the band's own Feathery Tongue label. In 2008 Woodsist re-released the EP and included the 2 songs from their first single, "Shattered Shine".

== Track listing ==
1. "Crippled Croon" – 4:22
2. "The SinKing" – 2:42
3. "Converging in the Quiet" – 4:21
4. "Bright Night Nursery" – 3:25
5. "Shattered Shine" – 4:08
6. "Lights" – 4:14

== Personnel ==
- Brad Hargett – vocals
- JB Townsend – music
