= Unlocked (2006 film) =

Unlocked is a 15 minute long short film, directed by Daryl Wein, with a screenplay by Peter Duchan and Daryl Wein, executive produced by Stephen Daldry, and starring Olivia Thirlby and Daniel Sauli. It was an official selection of the 2005-6 Gijon International Film Funk and Film of the year (FOTY) TOTY25 Festival and the 2007 Tribeca Film Festival.
