= The Craft: Legacy =

2020 American horror film by Zoe Lister-Jones

- VOD release poster
- Directed by: Zoe Lister-Jones
- Written by: Zoe Lister-Jones
- Based on: Characters by Peter Filardi
- Produced by: Douglas Wick; Lucy Fisher; Jason Blum
- Starring: Cailee Spaeny; Gideon Adlon; Lovie Simone; Zoey Luna; Nicholas Galitzine; Michelle Monaghan; David Duchovny
- Cinematography: Hillary Spera
- Edited by: Libby Cuenin
- Music by: Heather Christian
- Production companies: Columbia Pictures; Blumhouse Productions; Red Wagon Entertainment
- Distributed by: Sony Pictures Home Entertainment
- Release date: October 28, 2020
- Running time: 97 minutes
- Country: United States
- Language: English
- Budget: $18 million
- Box office: $2.3 million

The Craft: Legacy, also known as Blumhouse's The Craft: Legacy, is a 2020 American supernatural horror film written and directed by Zoe Lister-Jones. A legacy sequel to The Craft (1996), the film stars Cailee Spaeny, Gideon Adlon, Lovie Simone, and Zoey Luna as four teenage girls who practice witchcraft as a coven. Additional cast includes Nicholas Galitzine, Michelle Monaghan, and David Duchovny, with Fairuza Balk making a cameo appearance.

The Craft: Legacy was released in the United States through video on demand on October 28, 2020, by Sony Pictures Home Entertainment, with a theatrical release in select international markets beginning the same day. As a global pandemic had closed many of the world’s movie theaters, the film was a box-office bomb, earning $2.3 million worldwide on an $18 million budget, and received mixed reviews from critics. It was nominated for the 2021 GLAAD Media Award for Outstanding Film – Wide Theatrical Release.

== Plot ==
Lily Schechner moves into the town with her therapist mother, Helen, to live with Helen's new boyfriend Adam Harrison and his three sons, Jacob, Isaiah, and Abe. At the new school, she begins her period and bleeds through in class, and is mocked by classmates. When school bully Timmy Andrews antagonizes Lily, she telekinetically pushes Timmy into the lockers.

Her feat is witnessed by three girls, Frankie, Tabby, and Lourdes. When Lily communicates with them telepathically, the girls reveal themselves as fellow witches and invite her to join their coven. With the fourth member, the coven can now perform the complex ritual to freeze time.

The girls experiment with their powers, including levitation. They cast a spell on Timmy, changing his behavior to be more sensitive. After learning of the incident at school, Adam scolds Lily, but Helen defends her. Lily overhears them arguing and goes outside where Abe talks to her about his father's authoritarian beliefs.

Timmy invites the coven to his and apologizes to Lily, eventually making peace with the coven. When Timmy is at Lily's home for a school project, he admits that he is bisexual and had sex with Isaiah, Jacob's elder brother. Later, Lily places a love spell on Timmy and the two kiss. The next morning, during class, the coven is told by their teacher that Timmy allegedly committed suicide the night before. Lily admits to her friends about her kiss and love spell. They sever ties with her and bind themselves from magic.

Sensing something dangerous from Adam, Lily asks Helen to move out, to no avail. Searching Adam's office for something to use against him, Lily finds her own adoption papers. Helen reveals that Lily's biological mother is one of Helen's psychotherapy patients. After Timmy's funeral, Helen tells Lily she agrees to move out. Helen also admits that she knows about her powers. The conversation prompts Helen to ask Lily to give her powers to Helen. When Lily grows suspicious of her, Helen shapeshifts into Adam who has disguised himself with his own magic. Adam tells her he is a member of a pagan cult and that he has been after her powers since the beginning, before knocking her unconscious.

Lily awakens in a forest at night with Adam, who reveals that he murdered Timmy and plans to kill her too. When Timmy's spirit contacts Lily's friends through a Ouija board and tells them about being murdered by Adam, they arrive to save Lily. They try to freeze time, but Adam subdues them quickly. The girls then work together and use their elemental powers to defeat Adam, burning him to death. Later, Lily continues her friendship with the girls and Helen takes her to a mental health hospital to meet her birth mother, who is revealed to be Nancy Downs.

== Cast ==
- Cailee Spaeny as Lilith "Lily" Schechner, the central character
- Gideon Adlon as Frankie, one of the members of the coven and Lily's friend.
- Lovie Simone as Tabby, one of the members of the coven and Lily's friend.
- Zoey Luna as Lourdes, one of the members of the coven and Lily's friend.
- Nicholas Galitzine as Timmy Andrews, Lily's schoolmate
- Michelle Monaghan as Helen Schechner, Lily's adoptive mother
- David Duchovny as Adam Harrison, Lily's stepfather
- Julian Grey as Abe Harrison, Lily's stepbrother
- Charles Vandervaart as Jacob Harrison, Lily's stepbrother
- Donald MacLean Jr. as Isaiah Harrison, Lily's stepbrother
- Hannah Gordon as Ashley
- Chris Tomassetti as Jeremy
- James Madge as Mr. Bly
- Fairuza Balk as Nancy Downs, a witch and Lily's biological mother.

== Production ==
=== Development ===
A straight-to-DVD sequel to The Craft was in the works circa 2010, but never moved forward. In May 2016, Sony Pictures announced that a sequel was in development and would be written and directed by Leigh Janiak. The announcement of the sequel spawned negative reactions from fans of the original.

In March 2019, Zoe Lister-Jones was named as writer and director of the soft reboot, with Jason Blum as producer under his Blumhouse Productions banner, Andrew Fleming (director of the 1996 film) as executive producer, and Columbia Pictures distributing.

=== Casting ===
In June 2019, Cailee Spaeny was set to star in the film. In September 2019, Gideon Adlon, Lovie Simone, and Zoey Luna joined the cast as the other witches. In October 2019, Nicholas Galitzine, David Duchovny, Julian Grey, and Michelle Monaghan were also added, and in November 2019, Donald MacLean Jr. was cast.

=== Filming ===
Principal photography began in October 2019. During filming in Toronto, director Zoe Lister-Jones explained in an on-set interview that The Craft sequel "centers on young people, and young women specifically coming into their power in today's current climate".

=== Music ===
The film's original music, composed by Heather Christian, was released digitally by Madison Gate Records on October 28, 2020.

== Release ==
The Craft: Legacy was released on video on demand by Sony Pictures Releasing on October 28, 2020, followed by a theatrical release internationally. The film was released on Blu-ray and DVD on December 22, 2020, by Sony Pictures Home Entertainment.

== Reception ==
=== Box office ===
In its first weekend the film earned $680,000 while in the following weekend it earned $390,000 and in its third $242,000.

=== Critical response ===
On the review aggregator website Rotten Tomatoes, 47% of 112 critics' reviews are positive, with an average rating of 5.4/10. The website's consensus reads: "Although director Zoe Lister-Jones has forged a new path for the weirdos of today, The Craft: Legacy's spells may only enchant fans of the original." On Metacritic, the film has a score of 54 out of 100 based on reviews from 24 critics, indicating "mixed or average" reviews.

Kate Erbland, writing for Indiewire, said the film is "an entertaining and insightful mashup of tropes, both respectful of what came before and willing to try new tricks". Sheila O'Malley of RogerEbert.com gave the film two stars, saying, "The Craft: Legacy gets sidetracked with the Timmy sub-plot, and the film morphs into a teenage soap opera and/or ABC Afterschool Special."

=== Accolades ===
The Craft: Legacy was nominated for the 2021 GLAAD Media Award for Outstanding Film (Wide Release).

== Future ==
In October 2020, when interviewed about Fairuza Balk's cameo, Zoe Lister-Jones explained that she wrote the script with a continuation in mind. Lister-Jones also revealed that she had met with the original film's actresses during the preparation for Legacy and that she would be interested in making a third installment with an intergenerational storyline.

== See also ==
- List of films about witchcraft
