= Alight of Night =

Studio album by Crystal Stilts
- Released: October 28, 2008 (US), February 19, 2009 (UK)
- Genres: Noise pop; post-punk
- Length: 37:05
- Labels: Slumberland Records (US), Angular Records (UK)

Crystal Stilts chronology
Alight of Night (2008)	In Love with Oblivion (2011)

Professional ratings
Aggregate scores
Source	Rating
Metacritic	(76/100)
Review scores
Source	Rating
Allmusic	4/5 stars
Drowned In Sound	(9/10)
Venus Zine	5/5 stars
Last Broadcast	5/5 stars
Mojo (magazine)	4/5 stars
LAUNCHcast	(9/10)
NME	(8/10)
Pitchfork Media	(8.1/10)
Urb (magazine)	4/5 stars
Spin	3/5 stars
Prefix	(8.5/10)
Strange Glue	(9/10)
The Wire	4/5 stars
Gigwise	(8/10)

Alight of Night is the debut album by noise pop band Crystal Stilts, released in 2008. "Departure" and "Shattered Shine" were released as singles. "The Dazzled" and "Prismatic Room" were also in frequent rotation on Sirius XMU around the album's release.

== Reception ==
Heralded by critics, the album was included in Pitchfork's top 50 albums of 2008 and the NME's top 50 albums of 2009. It was also named album of the year by Stephen Pastel's (of The Pastels) Monorail Music in Glasgow and ranked the #2 Album of the Year by Other Music in New York City.

== Critical Quotations ==
Dot Music: "Alight Of Night is a garage-weaned, art rock, squat-dirty masterpiece."

Drowned in Sound: "Quite simply, Alight Of Night is one of the most breathtaking records these ears have been partial to in a long while, and even if Crystal Stilts never make another record, their legacy is assured."

Prefix Magazine: "Easily the most exhilarating rock 'n' roll record to emerge in 2008."

The Wire: "Crystal Stilts have created one of the most perfectly formed reconciliations of classic rock swagger and zoned dreampop... This is one of the best garage pop sides since The Chills' own "Brave Words."

Strangeglue: "Crystal Stilts have created a record that has truly astounded this writer. A debut with this much promise should not be kept in the dark, it should be shown to the world as an example of how to do it right."

Mojo (magazine): "Alight Of Night is devoid of current context, making for a weird timelessness. A treat."

Gigwise: "With Alight of Night we see glimpses of a new intelligence that divides them from the 80's contemporary... it'd be hyperbolic to try and claim Crystal Stilts are revolutionaries of their genre but they're playing new tricks and they're all the better for it."

== Track listing ==
1. "The Dazzled" – 3:56
2. "Crystal Stilts" – 2:57
3. "Graveyard Orbit" – 3:26
4. "Prismatic Room" – 3:36
5. "The Sinking" – 2:35
6. "Departure" – 4:28
7. "Shattered Shine" – 2:51
8. "Verdant Gaze" – 2:08
9. "Bright Night" – 2:22
10. "Spiral Transit" – 3:45
11. "The City In The Sea" – 4:59

== Personnel ==
- Brad Hargett – vocals
- JB Townsend – guitar
- Kyle Forester – keyboards
- Andy Adler – bass
