= Ardele Lister =

American artist

Ardele Lister is a Canada-born and New York-based video artist working in time-based media.

== Early life ==
Lister was born in Calgary, Alberta, Canada, as the daughter of Rose (née Bercovice) and furrier Jack Lister. She is Jewish.

Lister's degrees of B.A., M.A.A.B.D., British Columbia (Canada) are attested by Rutgers University.

== Art career ==
Lister began making films in the early 1970s. Her films include So Where's My Prince Already? (1976), Spilt (1980), Hello (1984), Behold the Promised Land, and Conditional Love (See Under: Nationalism–Canada) (1997). She also worked on avant-garde television projects such as Pee-wee's Playhouse (CBS) for which she produced the 'Connect the Dots' segments.

Lister's works have been shown internationally in festivals, galleries, museums, and on television, and are in the permanent collections of the Museum of Modern Art (New York), Centre Georges Pompidou (Paris), the Stedelijk Museum (Amsterdam), Academie der Kunst (Berlin), and the National Gallery of Canada (Ottawa). She also has written for and edited art and media publications and founded the magazines Criteria and The Independent.

== Publishing career ==
Lister founded and edited the journal CRITERIA, a Quarterly Review of the Arts, in 1974 in Vancouver. It was initially published under the auspices of the Vancouver Art Gallery, where she produced a weekly television show on the gallery's events and exhibitions, but by 1977 had dis-affiliated. Volumes 1-4 were published until Fall 1978, Volume 4, Number 2. CRITERIA published art projects and writings by Lawrence Weiner, John Baldessari, Robin Blaser, and Ardele Lister; and interviews with Judy Chicago, Martha Wilson, and Dennis Wheeler.

In 1977, while working for the Associated of Independent Video and Film Makers, facilitating an innovative project funded by the National Endowment for the Arts entitled "Short Film Showcase," Ardele Lister created and edited "The Independent," the first magazine devoted to the needs of independent video and film makers. The magazine is still published by the Foundation for Independent Video and Film, in New York, today as a blog.

== Academic career ==
From 1991 to the present, Lister has taught media production and critical studies at Rutgers University, where she is currently Graduate Director of Visual Arts. She has also taught at Montclair State University in New Jersey, School of the Visual Arts, and Center for Media Arts, both in New York City.

Additionally, Lister has written articles for AfterImage, Felix, Collapse, and Heresies.

== Personal life ==
She is the mother of actress Zoe Lister-Jones and the former wife of the American photographer and media artist Bill Jones, who converted to Judaism upon their marriage.

She was president of a local Conservative egalitarian synagogue that the family attended every Saturday, and she also kept a kosher home.

== Notes ==
- Tonkonow, Leslie, “Leslie Tonkonow Interviews Ardele Lister,” Collapse, Vol. 3, December 1997. pp. 154–169.
- McCoy, Pat, “A Brief Conversation Between Ardele Lister and Pat McCoy,” Felix, vol. 1, no. 3. 1997. pp. 79–83.

== See also ==
- Time-Based Art Festival
