= Radiant Door =

EP by Crystal Stilts
- Released: November 15, 2011
- Genre: Noise pop, neo-psychedelia, post-punk
- Length: 21:33
- Label: Sacred Bones
- Producer: JB Townsend

Crystal Stilts chronology
Crystal Stilts EP (2008)	Radiant Door (2011)

Professional ratings
Aggregate scores
Source	Rating
Metacritic	(67/100)
Review scores
Source	Rating
Allmusic	3.5/5 stars
Drowned In Sound	(7/10)
Pitchfork Media	(7.4/10)

Radiant Door is the second EP by the noise pop band Crystal Stilts. It was released in 2011 through Sacred Bones.

== Track listing ==
1. "Dark Eyes" – 4:17
2. "Radiant Door" – 3:11
3. "Still As the Night" – 3:13
4. "Low Profile" – 5:05
5. "Frost Inside the Asylums" – 5:47

== Personnel ==
- Brad Hargett – vocals
- JB Townsend – guitar
- Kyle Forester – keyboards
- Andy Adler – bass
- Keegan Cooke – drums
