= Ebon Moss-Bachrach =

American actor (born 1977)

- Moss-Bachrach at the 2026 New York Film Festival
- Born: March 19, 1977 (age 49); New York City, U.S.
- Education: Columbia University (BA)
- Occupation: Actor
- Years active: 1997–present
- Spouse: Yelena Yemchuk
- Children: 2

Ebon Che Moss-Bachrach (/ˈɛbən mɒs ˈbækˌræk/) (born March 19, 1977) is an American actor. He is known for his role as restaurant manager Richie Jerimovich in the comedy-drama series The Bear (2022–2026), for which he was twice awarded the Primetime Emmy Award for Outstanding Supporting Actor in a Comedy Series in addition to two Golden Globe Award nominations.

Moss-Bachrach has also had major television roles on Girls (2014–2017) and NOS4A2 (2019–2020), and appeared in the first season of Andor (2022). In the Marvel Cinematic Universe, he portrayed David "Micro" Lieberman in the first season of The Punisher (2017), and starred as Ben Grimm/The Thing in the film The Fantastic Four: First Steps (2025) and is set to reprise the role in Avengers: Doomsday (2026) and Avengers: Secret Wars (2027).

He made his Broadway debut from March to July 2026 in Dog Day Afternoon.

== Early life and education ==
Ebon Moss-Bachrach was born on March 19, 1977 in New York City, His parents ran a music school in Springfield, Massachusetts. His middle name of "Che" was given to him by his parents after the famous Argentinian leader and revolutionary Che Guevara. His father was born in Germany to Jewish-American parents.

Moss-Bachrach attended high school at Amherst Regional High School in Massachusetts, and graduated from Columbia University in 1999 with a B.A. in English Literature. He initially was an American history major and a music studies major. During his third year of college, he studied abroad in Alicante, Spain for a semester.

As a child, Moss-Bachrach had a passion for theatre and movies, and also loved to read. Some of his favorite authors were Isaac Asimov and Piers Anthony. He spent much of his childhood indoors, and described his younger self as an "escapist." In high school, Moss-Bachrach joined the school band, and became fond of performing. One of his favorite musical artists was Ornette Coleman.

During his first year of college, Moss-Bachrach took an acting class out of curiosity, and quickly became inspired to pursue theater. After the class, he became an apprentice at the Williamstown Theatre Festival to gain some experience in theater. Moss-Bachrach went on to study acting and the Meisner technique at the William Esper Studio in New York City.

== Career ==
=== 1999–2019: Early roles and Girls ===
Moss-Bachrach started his career taking early roles on stage at the Williamstown Theatre Festival in the late 1990s. He made his A&E television debut in a supporting role in the mystery crime film Murder in a Small Town (1999) which starred Gene Wilder. In 2001, he acted in three films including a small role as a Bellboy in the Wes Anderson directed family dramedy The Royal Tenenbaums. During this time Moss-Bachrach, said he resisted moving to Los Angeles and said he stayed in New York City preferring to act in plays and roles in film and television. On stage, he acted in the 2003 Off-Broadway production of the Lanford Wilson play Fifth of July at the Signature Theatre Company acting opposite David Harbour, Parker Posey and Robert Sean Leonard. During this time took supporting roles in films such as the biographical dramedy American Splendor (2003), the drama Mona Lisa Smile (2003), the fantasy romance The Lake House (2005), and the romance drama Evening (2007). He portrayed John Quincy Adams in the critically acclaimed Emmy-Award winning historical drama miniseries John Adams (2008).

He took a recurring roles in the legal drama series Damages starring Glenn Close and the action series The Last Ship (2014–2015). He supporting film role in the Greta Gerwig-led comedy Lola Versus (2012). He had his television breakout playing Desi in the HBO series Girls, which began as a recurring role before he became a series regular in the series' final three seasons from 2014 to 2017. In an interview with The New York Times he said that "I was begging my agents to get me an audition, and they couldn’t" before he was finally cast in the series. Of his character, he noted of people's perceptions saying, “I got very proprietary and defensive and protective of him." He acted in the Nick Jones off-Broadway play Verité opposite Anna Camp at Lincoln Center. He subsequently appeared as David Lieberman / Micro in the Netflix superhero action series The Punisher (2017).

=== 2020–2024: Stardom with The Bear ===
In 2020, he acted in the CBS All Access true crime drama series Interrogation starring Peter Sarsgaard, David Strathairn, and Kodi Smit-McPhee before it was cancelled after one season. Moss-Bachrach earned critical acclaim and attention for his role as an assistant manager of a sandwich shop, Richie Jerimovich in the FX on Hulu dramedy series The Bear starring opposite Jeremy Allen White. He played the role from 2022 to 2026 and earned numerous accolades for his performance including Primetime Emmy Awards for Outstanding Supporting Actor in a Comedy Series, a Critics' Choice Television Award for Best Supporting Actor in a Comedy Series, and a Actor Award for Outstanding Performance by an Ensemble in a Comedy Series as well as two nominations for the Golden Globe Award for Best Supporting Actor – Series, Miniseries or Television Film.

He played investigative reporter John Carreyrou in the Hulu limited series The Dropout (2022) miniseries about the rise and fall of Elizabeth Holmes plated by Amanda Seyfried. He took the role of Arvel Skeen in the Star Wars series Andor (2022) on Disney+. That same year he reunited with Lena Dunham who directed him in the sex comedy Sharp Stick (2022) playing a supporting role opposite Kristine Froseth and Jon Bernthal. He played a sad-sack ex-boyfriend of Jennifer Lawrence's character in the 2023 comedy No Hard Feelings. During this time he voiced roles in the animated series Bob's Burgers and Krapopolis both in 2024. Also that year he acted in the psychological drama Hold Your Breath (2024) starring Sarah Paulson and Annaleigh Ashford.

=== 2025–present: Career expansion ===
In July 2025, Moss-Bachrach portrayed Ben Grimm / The Thing in The Fantastic Four: First Steps (2025) and is set to reprise the role in Avengers: Doomsday (2026) and Avengers: Secret Wars (2027). He is a signatory of the Film Workers for Palestine boycott pledge that was published in September 2025. He made his Broadway debut in the spring of 2026 opposite Jon Bernthal in Stephen Adly Guirgis's stage adaptation of Dog Day Afternoon. In May 2026, FX released "Gary", a standalone special episode of The Bear streaming separately from the rest of the show's catalogue. The special, written by and starring Moss-Bachrach and Bernthal, is set before the events of the series.

== Personal life ==
Moss‑Bachrach has been married to Ukrainian photographer and artist Yelena Yemchuk since the 2000s; the couple met at a dinner party in New York City and began dating about a year and a half later. They have two daughters, Sasha (b. 2007) and Maribelle (b. 2010), and live together in Brooklyn Heights, New York, with their cat Sonny.

== Filmography ==
=== Film ===
Key
†	Denotes works that have not yet been released

Year	Title	Role	Notes
2001	The Believer	First Waiter	
2001	Never Again	Andy	
2001	The Royal Tenenbaums	Frederick the Bellboy	
2003	American Splendor	MTV Director	
2003	Death of a Dynasty	Dave Katz	
2003	Mona Lisa Smile	Charlie Stewart	
2004	Winter Solstice	Steve	
2004	Poster Boy	Charlie	
2004	Point & Shoot	Chad Rhodes	
2005	The Dying Gaul	Olaf	
2005	Stealth	Tim	
2005	Road	Jay	
2006	Out There	Stan	
2006	Live Free or Die	Alex Gazaniga	
2006	The Lake House	Henry Wyler	
2006	Wedding Daze	Matador	
2007	Chicago 10	Paul Krassner	Voice
2007	High Falls	Jackson	Short film
2007	Suburban Girl	Ethan Eisenberg	
2007	Evening	Luc	
2009	Breaking Upwards	Dylan	
2009	The Marc Pease Experience	Gavin	
2011	Higher Ground	Luke	
2012	Lola Versus	Nick	
2012	Come Out and Play	Francis	
2013	The Volunteer	Ethan	
2013	Gods Behaving Badly	Neil	
2014	We'll Never Have Paris	Guillaume	
2014	The Grey Matter	Simon Peterson	Short film
2017	Tokyo Project	Sebastian	Short film
2018	The Big Take	Max O'Leary	
2019	Good Posture	Don Price	
2019	Blow the Man Down	Gorski	
2019	Lying and Stealing	Ray Warding	
2020	Tesla	Anitai Szigeti	
2022	Sharp Stick	Yuli	
2023	No Hard Feelings	Gary	
2024	Hold Your Breath	Wallace Grady	
2025	The Fantastic Four: First Steps	Ben Grimm / The Thing	
2026	The Man I Love	Gene	
2026	A Long Winter	Lester	
2026	Avengers: Doomsday †	Ben Grimm / The Thing	Post-production
TBA	Foxfinder †	TBA	Filming

=== Television ===
Year	Title	Role	Notes
1999	Murder in a Small Town	Billy	Television film
2001	Law & Order: Criminal Intent	College Boy	Episode: "One"
2002	Porn 'n Chicken	Hutch	Television film
2005	Law & Order: Trial by Jury	Danny Wallace	Episode: "Truth or Consequences"
2006	Law & Order: Special Victims Unit	Justin	Episode: "Informed"
2006	Kidnapped	Tucker	Episode: "Sorry, Wrong Number"
2008	John Adams	John Quincy Adams	Miniseries; 3 episodes
2008	Fringe	Joseph Meegar	Episode: "Power Hungry"
2009	Medium	Simon Burwell	Episode: "The First Bite Is the Deepest"
2009	A NY Thing	Arthur	Television film
2010	Damages	Nick Salenger	8 episodes
2010	Rubicon	Craig Young	3 episodes
2013–2016	Person of Interest	Michael Cole	2 episodes
2014	Believe	Ben Wooten	Episode: "White Noise"
2014–2015	The Last Ship	Niels Sørensen	10 episodes
2014–2017	Girls	Desi Harperin	Series regular; 25 episodes
2017	The Punisher	David Lieberman / Micro	Series regular; 12 episodes
2019–2020	NOS4A2	Chris McQueen	Series regular; 20 episodes
2020	Interrogation	Trey Carano	6 episodes
2022	The Dropout	John Carreyrou	Miniseries, 3 episodes
2022	Andor	Arvel Skeen	3 episodes
2022–2026	The Bear	Richard "Richie" Jerimovich	Series regular; 45 episodes; also wrote episode: "Gary"
2024	Bob's Burgers	Vincent Bartos (voice)	Episode: "To Catch a Beef"
2024	Krapopolis	Opie the Ophiotaurus (voice)	Episode: "Ice Week"
2025	Rick and Morty	Christ Trooper General Reinhard Kincaid (voice)	Episode: "The Last Temptation of Jerry"
2025	Reading Rainbow	Himself	Episode: "No Cats in the Library!"

=== Theatre ===
Year	Title	Role	Venue	Notes
1997	Dead End	T.B.	Williamstown Theatre Festival	Massachusetts
1997	Princess Turandot	Altoum's Men	Williamstown Theatre Festival	Massachusetts
2000	When They Speak of Rita	Jimmy	Primary Stages	Off-Broadway
2000	Side Man	Clifford	San Jose Repertory Theatre	California
2001	36 Views	John Bell	Berkeley Repertory Theatre	California
2002	36 Views	John Bell	The Public Theater	Off-Broadway
2003	Fifth of July	Weston Hurley	Signature Theatre Company	Off-Broadway
2005	On the Mountain	Carrick	Playwrights Horizons	Off-Broadway
2011	Three Sisters	Nicolai Lvovich Tuzenbach	Classic Stage Company	Off-Broadway
2015	Verité	Winston	Lincoln Center Theater	Off-Broadway
2015	Lost Girls	Lou	Lucille Lortel Theatre	Off-Broadway
2026	Dog Day Afternoon	Sal DeSilva	August Wilson Theatre	Broadway

== Awards and nominations ==
Organizations	Year	Award	Category	Result	Ref.
Actor Awards	2023	Outstanding Ensemble in a Comedy Series	The Bear (season one)	Nominated	
Actor Awards	2024	Outstanding Actor in a Comedy Series	The Bear (season two)	Nominated	
Actor Awards	2024	Outstanding Ensemble in a Comedy Series	The Bear (season two)	Won	
Actor Awards	2025	Outstanding Ensemble in a Comedy Series	The Bear (season three)	Nominated	
Actor Awards	2026	Outstanding Ensemble in a Comedy Series	The Bear (season four)	Nominated	
Critics Choice Television Awards	2024	Best Supporting Actor in a Comedy Series	The Bear	Won	
Golden Globe Awards	2022	Best Supporting Actor – Series, Miniseries or Television Film	The Bear	Nominated	
Golden Globe Awards	2024	Best Supporting Actor – Series, Miniseries or Television Film	The Bear	Nominated	
Independent Spirit Award	2023	Best Supporting Performance in a New Scripted Series	The Bear	Nominated	
Los Angeles Film Festival	2005	Jury Prize: Outstanding Performance (shared with Catherine Kellner)	Road	Won	
Online Film & Television Association	2005	Best Guest Actor in a Drama Series	Law & Order: Trial by Jury	Nominated	
Primetime Emmy Award	2023	Outstanding Supporting Actor in a Comedy Series	The Bear (episode: "Ceres")	Won	
Primetime Emmy Award	2023	Outstanding Supporting Actor in a Comedy Series	The Bear (episode: "Forks")	Won	
Primetime Emmy Award	2025	Outstanding Supporting Actor in a Comedy Series	The Bear (episode: "Doors")	Nominated	
