= Sam Rosen (actor) =

American actor and writer

- Born: United States
- Occupations: Actor, film director, screenwriter
- Years active: 2000–present

Sam Rosen is an American actor and writer.

== Film work ==
One of Rosen's earliest film roles, if not his first was playing a white rapist in The Hymens Parable which was directed by Jon Springer. Then he appeared as Eddie in the Bill Semans directed Herman U. S. A. which was released in 2001.

In an International Business Times article about the film Five Days Gone, it said that he bestowed the film with a passionate, memorable performance as the drug addicted boyfriend of Alice (played by director Anna Kerrigan. He was the lead actor and co-writer of the Brady Kiernan directed film Stuck Between Stations. The film which premiered at the Tribeca Film Festival in New York, was about a man and a woman who meet after a fight in a nightclub, who start talking and realize that they have some common history.
