= Madigan Shive =

American singer-songwriter

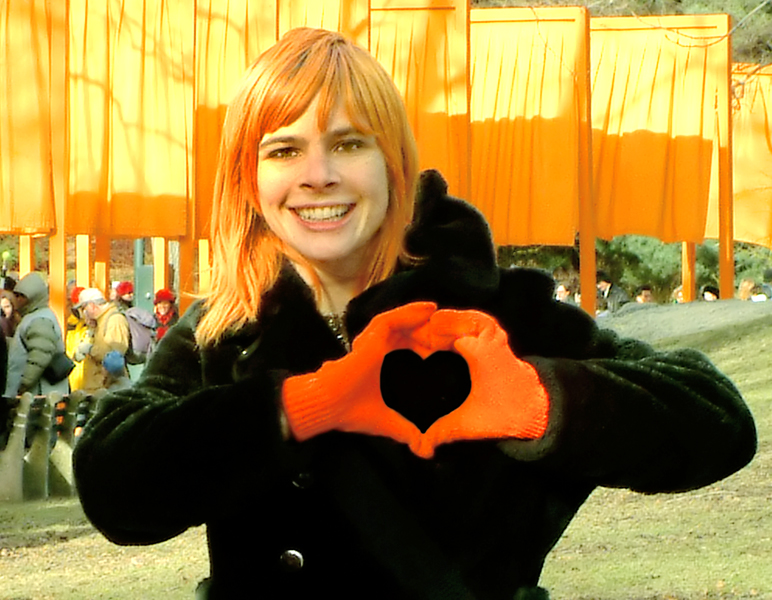
- Shive in Central Park, New York, 2005

Background information
- Born: Seattle, Washington, U.S.
- Genres: avant-garde
- Instruments: Cello, guitar, vocals
- Years active: 1992–present
- Labels: Kill Rock Stars; St. Francis; MoonPuss Music
- Website: bonfiremadigan.com

Madigan Shive, also known as Bonfire Madigan Shive, is an American songwriter, performing artist, community organizer, and musician.

Shive is a cellist, singer and guitarist, formerly of the band Tattle Tale and now fronting her own ensemble, Bonfire Madigan. She composes symphonic pieces and performs for live theatre and film. She was a part of the riot grrrl movement of the 1990s and her songs have been included in independent feature and documentary films.

== Biography ==
Shive's parents were "intentional future community" people; her mother called her Running Pony until she was about six years old, and regularly changed her name. Shive eventually chose one of them, Madigan, as her permanent name when she was a teenager. The family lived in a teepee in Washington for about two years when she was a child, and moved often. She learned to play cello from age nine.

In 1992, at age 17 she formed the Seattle based duo Tattle Tale with Jen Wood. Tattle Tale were a part of the riot grrrl movement. They released an album, Tattle Tale, on the Kill Rock Stars label and an album on St. Francis Records. The band broke up in 1995.

In 1995, Shive formed her own artist run music label, MoonPuss Music and began solo releases as Bonfire Madigan. She released the Rock Stop EP in 1996. The song "Pity Rock" from the EP featured in the film Sleeping Beauties by Jamie Babbit. Babbit also used Tattle Tale's "Glass Vase Cello Case" as the love theme in her film But I'm a Cheerleader (1999). In 1996 Shive also released the Fortunes From The F-Holes album.

In 1997, she formed the ensemble project Bonfire Madigan with original members contrabassist Sheri Ozeki, guitarist Shelley Doty, and percussionist Tomas (Tomas Palermo). The music has been described as "mixes classical stringed elements with modern beats and percussion into a punk-influenced, emotional concoction." Bonfire Madigan continues as a collaborative effort with other rotating musicians.

In 2001, Shive made news while raising money to fight tenant eviction and trying to raise awareness of tenant's and poor peoples' rights.

Shive says she has been actively hearing voices and having experiences of what mainstream psychiatry would call delusions but that she frames differently, including mood extremes, all her life. In 2003 she became a founding collective member of The Icarus Project alongside Sascha Scatter, Jacks Ashley McNamara and Will Hall. The Icarus Project was a mental health organization and network with the view that many phenomena commonly labeled as mental illness should instead be regarded as "dangerous gifts". She has said "We see our madness as a dangerous gift to be cultivated and taken care of, not a disease to be cured". Hall credits Shive as the conceptual origin of Icarus Project's embrace of the harm reduction framework for psychiatric drug withdrawal.

In 2008, Shive was a contributing author to the anthology Live Through This: On Creativity and Self-Destruction on Seven Stories Press.

Shive has made symphonic pieces and performances for live theatre and film since 2006. Chad Jones, reviewing her performance in 'Tis Pity She's a Whore at the American Conservatory Theater for SF Theatre Examiner, wrote "What makes the play worth seeing is the live music provided by punk cellist/vocalist Bonfire Madigan Shive, a fascinating performer who connects to the play more viscerally than the actors."

She is based in the Mexico / US border region of California.

== Discography ==
=== With Tattle Tale ===
- Tell/Yell (Kill Rock Stars, 1993) – demo album on cassette
- Tattle Tale (Kill Rock Stars, 1994) – EP / album on cassette
- Early daze (Pillarbox Red, 1994) – 7-inch EP
- Sew True (St. Francis, 1995) – album on CD
- Alderwood Mall / Loose lips (Chou Chou, 1995) – 7-inch single

=== As Madigan ===
- Plays With Herself (MoonPuss / Live Transmission, 1995) – 7-inch single
- Rock Stop (MoonPuss, 1996) – EP on 12-inch and CD
- Fortunes From The F-Holes (MoonPuss, 1996) – cassette album

=== As Bonfire Madigan ===
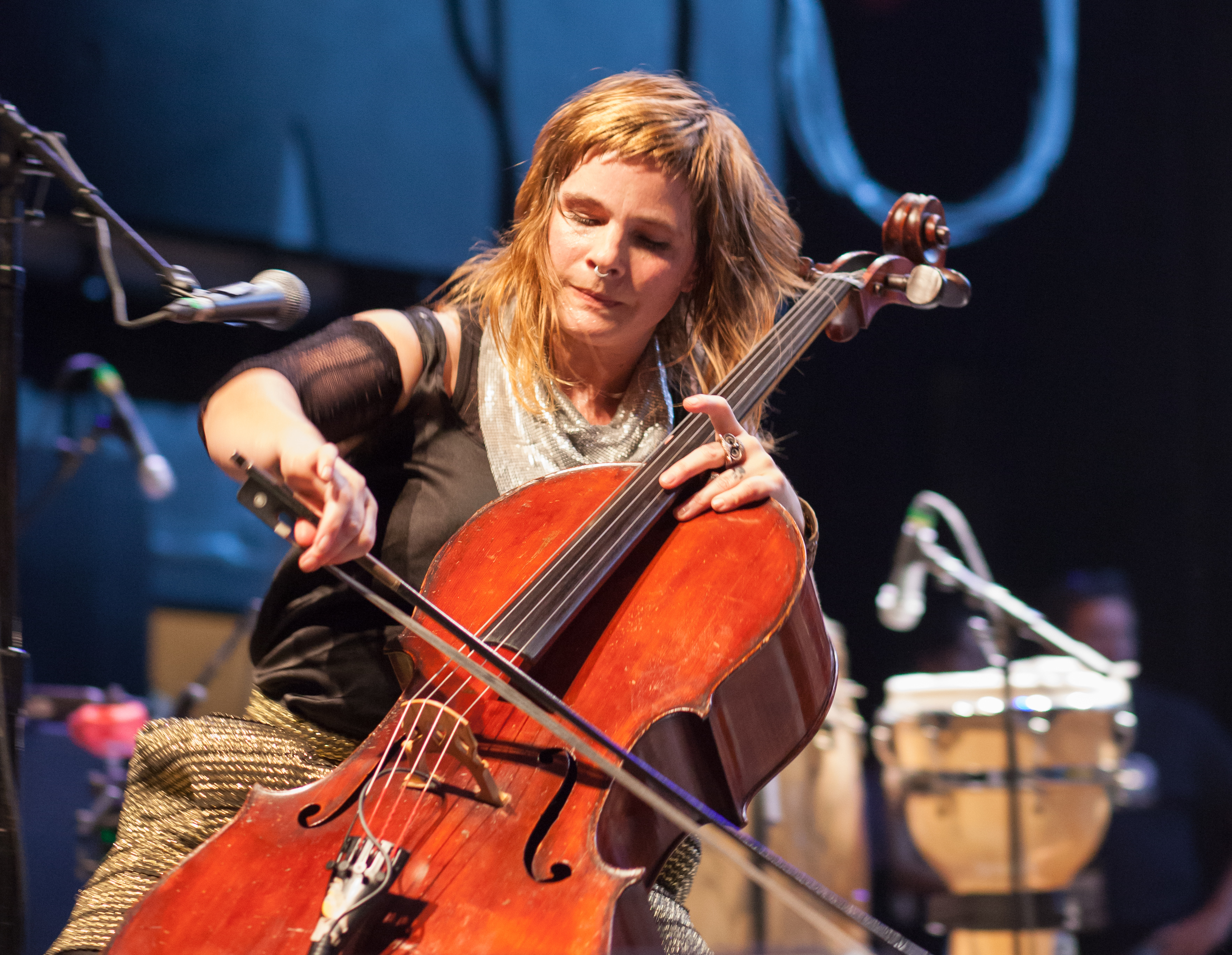
Bonfire Madigan performing at the Regency Ballroom in San Francisco, September 2016.

==== Albums ====
- ...From the Burnpile (Kill Rock Stars, 1998)
- Saddle the Bridge (Kill Rock Stars, 2000)
- Plays for Change (MoonPuss, 2003) – live recording
- I Bleed: a Decade of Song (MoonPuss, 2008) – a compilation of mostly previously released work as Tattle Tale, Madigan and Bonfire Madigan

==== EPs ====
- 88 (MoonPuss, 2002)
- Lady Saves (MoonPuss, 2009) – 12-inch. Includes remixes by Neotropic and Dub I.D. (Tomas Palermo). Edition of 1000 copies.

==== Contributions to other releases ====
- Pixies Fuckin' Die! (LifeLike, 1999) – compilation album of Pixies covers to which Shive contributed "Monkey Gone to Heaven"
- Gone Ain't Gone (ANTI-, 2006) album by Tim Fite – Shive played cello on "The More You Do"

== Theater works ==
- 2006: Prepared solo cello suites for Vigil of Light at Grace Cathedral, San Francisco, CA.
- 2008: Live score written and performed for 'Tis Pity She's a Whore, directed by Carey Perloff, at the American Conservatory Theater, San Francisco, CA. 'Tis Pity She's a Whore is a tragedy written by John Ford.
- 2008: Live material for Twisted Christmas program at Barbican Hall, Barbican Centre, London. Also featured Jarvis Cocker, Patrick Wolf, Sandy Dillon, Daniel Knox, Mary Margaret O’Hara, Smoke Fairies, Foy Vance, Kathryn Williams and Neill MacColl, and Frank Sidebottom.
- 2008: Performing composer for Powerful Voices, Women of Ancient Greek Drama at The Onassis Cultural Center, New York.
- 2010: Original recorded score for The Lion in Winter at Shakespeare Santa Cruz, Santa Cruz, CA.
- 2010: Composer and musical director for a new English translation of Sophocles' Elektra at Getty Villa, J. Paul Getty Museum, Los Angeles, featuring Olympia Dukakis.

== Filmography ==
=== Films about Shive ===
- Whisper Rapture: A Bonfire Madigan Suite (2018) – by Ken Paul Rosenthal, 36-minutes

=== Soundtrack contributions ===
- 1998: "Pity Rock" by Madigan featured in Sleeping Beauties short film by Jamie Babbit.
- 1999: "Glass Vase Cello Case" by Tattle Tale featured in But I'm a Cheerleader feature film by Jamie Babbit.
- 2001: "Snowfell Summer" by Bonfire Madigan featured in Chain Camera feature length documentary film by Kirby Dick.
- 2002: "Scraps" by Bonfire Madigan featured in Better Luck Tomorrow feature film by Justin Lin.
- 2006: "Cage" by Bonfire Madigan featured in Laibach 3: Divided States of America / Laibach Live (2006).

=== Other film contributions ===
- 2002: "7 Mile Lane" performed live by Bonfire Madigan, and an interview with Shive, featured in D.I.Y. or Die: How to Survive as an Independent Artist documentary film by Michael W. Dean. Also includes contributions from Ian MacKaye, J Mascis, John John Jesse, Jim Rose, J. G. Thirlwell, Lydia Lunch, Mike Watt, Richard Kern Ron Asheton, and Dave Brockie.
- 2003: "Mad Skywriting" performed live by Bonfire Madigan in Angel Food by Harper Carter. 26-minute documentary short film following Shive on her solo tour of France.
- 2006: "Mad Skywriting" performed live by Bonfire Madigan in Don't Need You: the Herstory of Riot Grrrl documentary film about the origins of the Riot Grrrl movement.
- 2009: Score, starring role and co-director (with Hilary Goldberg) of Transliminal Criminal short film.
- 2010: Shive contributed cello compositions for Crooked Beauty documentary short film by Ken Paul Rosenthal about artist-activist Jacks McNamara's journey from childhood abuse to psych ward inpatient to mental health advocacy.

== Books with contributions by Shive ==
- Live Through This: On Creativity and Self-destruction. New York, NY: Seven Stories, 2008. ISBN 978-1-58322-827-2. Edited by Sabrina Chapadjiev. Shive contributes a chapter, "Cello Speak: Exploring New Languages for Madness".
