= Tiger trap =

Tiger trap may refer to:

- Trou de loup, also known as tiger trap, a medieval booby trap
- Tiger Trap, an American pop band
  - Tiger Trap (album), their 1993 self-titled debut
