= Tattle Tale =

American musical group

- Origin: Seattle, Washington
- Genres: Folk punk Indie rock
- Years active: 1992–1995
- Labels: Kill Rock Stars; St. Francis Records
- Past members: Jen Wood; Madigan Shive

Tattle Tale was an American musical group that existed between 1992 and 1995. Composed of Jen Wood and Madigan Shive, they were active in the grrrl pop scene, playing what was later to be termed folk punk.

The Seattle-based group's song "Glass Vase Cello Case" was featured in the 1999 film But I'm A Cheerleader by Jamie Babbit.

== Overview ==
The group was formed by Jen Wood and Madigan Shive in 1992 at the ages of 15 and 17 respectively. They played on numerous compilations before releasing their first single, titled "Early Daze," which was followed by their second single, "Alderwood Mall."

On November 9, 1993, they released a self-titled demo cassette on the record label Kill Rock Stars, and on July 14, 1995, they released an album titled Sew True, which is now out of print.

In 1995, the band broke up, with Wood pursuing a solo career and several collaborative efforts including vocals on 2005 releases by The Postal Service, and Shive fronting the chamber-punk group Bonfire Madigan.

== Discography ==
=== Albums ===
- Tell/Yell (1993), Kill Rock Stars – demo album on cassette
- Tattle Tale (1994), Kill Rock Stars – EP / album on cassette
- Sew True (1995), St. Francis – album on CD

=== Singles ===
- Early daze (1994), Pillarbox Red Records – 7-inch EP
- Alderwood Mall / Loose lips (1995), Chou Chou records – 7-inch single

=== Contributions to compilation albums ===
- Julep (1993), Yoyo Recordings – compilation album on vinyl and CD to which Tattle Tale contributed "Fly Away"
- Babble On (1994) – compilation cassette album of bands from the Seattle/Issaquah/Olympia area, to which Tattle Tale contributed "Glass Vase Cello Case" (demo?) and "Arrows"
- Periscope (1994), Yoyo Recordings – compilation album on vinyl and CD to which Tattle Tale contributed "Girls Go To Heaven"
- Move Into The Villa Viillakulla (1996), Villa Villakula Records – compilation album on vinyl and CD to which Tattle Tale contributed "Take 10" and "Erica"
