= Too Pure (disambiguation) =

Too Pure was a London-based independent record label 1990–2008.

Too Pure may also refer to:

- "Too Pure", a song by Sebadoh from their 1996 album Harmacy
- Too Pure (film), produced by Jules Labarthe (1998)
