= Portola =

Portola may refer to:

- Portola (album), a 1998 album by Rose Melberg
- Portola, California
- Portola, San Francisco, California
- Portola Music Festival
- Portola High School (Irvine, California)

== People with the surname ==
- Gaspar de Portolá (ca. 1717-aft.1784), Spanish soldier, first governor of the Californias (Baja and Alta), explorer and founder of San Diego and Monterey

== See also ==
- Portola Hills, California
- Portola Valley, California
- Portola Pharmaceuticals
