= Winter Pageant =

Studio album by the Softies
- Released: 1997
- Genre: Indie rock
- Label: K

The Softies chronology
The Softies (1996)	Winter Pageant (1997)	Holiday in Rhode Island (2000)

Winter Pageant is an album by the American indie rock musical duo the Softies, released in 1997. The sound was occasionally dismissed as "crush-core". The duo supported the album with a North American tour.

== Production ==
The album was recorded without a rhythm section, with one or two guitars as accompaniment. The majority of the songs deal with troubled relationships and broken friendships.

== Critical reception ==
Professional ratings
Review scores
Source	Rating
AllMusic	4/5 stars
NME	6/10
Spin	7/10
Martin C. Strong	5/10

Entertainment Weekly wrote that "Jen Sbragia and Rose Melberg ... strum and twang guitars while delicately harmonizing, their lovely vocals masking bitter lyrics about broken relationships." CMJ New Music Monthly thought that Melberg and Sbragia's voices "are complementary, but there's a cool space between them: a graceful austerity that creates some of the record's most sublime moments." The Oregonian decided that "the Softies are saved from being mired between the twin evils of cutesy candy-coating and abject despair by a queer note of hope found in even their saddest stories."

Spin called the album "music for indoor introverts—solitary souls who still write letters." The Washington Post opined that it "combines '50s lounge music melodies with the '60s pop-rock harmonies of Softie Rose Melberg's previous band, the ebullient Tiger Trap." The Lincoln Journal Star deemed Winter Pageant "deeply honest confessions of lost love, broken promises and lives adrift, set in quiet songs that are near lullabies, but have a lasting power."

AllMusic wrote that "despite the melancholy tone, there is something hopeful in the Softies' resignation, a faith in perfect moments that is as strong as the knowledge of love's frailty."

== Track listing ==
No.	Title	Length
1.	"Pack Your Things and Go"
2.	"So Sad"
3.	"Over"
4.	"No One at All"
5.	"Tracks and Tunnels"
6.	"Excellent"
7.	"My Foolish Way"
8.	"The Best Days"
9.	"Fortune"
10.	"Splintered Hands"
11.	"About You"
12.	"Anywhere but Here"
13.	"Winter Pageant"
14.	"Make Up Your Mind"

== Personnel ==
- Rose Melberg
- Jen Sbragia
