= Jen Wood =

American singer-songwriter

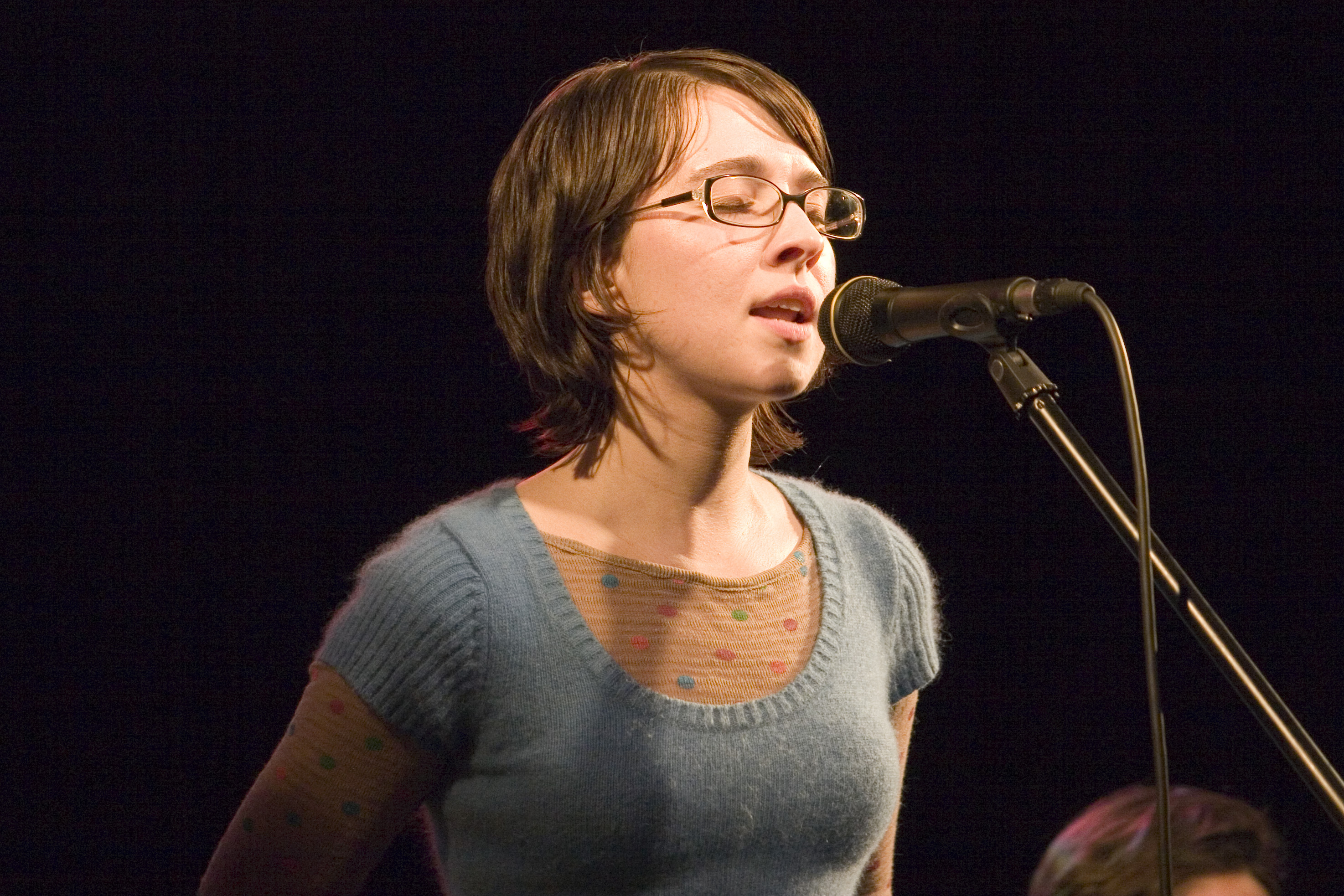
- Wood performing in 2006

Background information
- Born: Jennifer Wood; 1976 (age 49–50); Seattle, Washington, US
- Genres: Alternative rock Indie rock
- Occupation: Musician
- Instruments: Vocals, guitar
- Years active: 1992–present
- Label: Sonic Ritual
- Formerly of: Tattle Tale; The Postal Service

Jennifer "Jen" Wood (born c. 1976) is an American indie rock musician based in Seattle, Washington. A solo artist since 1996, she was previously a member of alternative rock band Tattle Tale.

== Biography ==
In 1992, at the age of fifteen, Wood formed Tattle Tale with school friend Madigan Shive. The band released two albums, Tattle Tale in 1993 and Sew True in 1995. Their song "Glass Vase Cello Case" featured in the 1999 film But I'm a Cheerleader by Jamie Babbit.

In 1996, after the breakup of Tattle Tale, Wood went to Santa Cruz, California and recorded a number of songs which she released as No More Wading.

After recording Getting Past the Static, she moved back to Seattle.

In 2003, she appeared as a guest vocalist on the collaborative effort Give Up by The Postal Service, providing the female vocals for the duet "Nothing Better" and backing vocals on "Such Great Heights." On July 18, 2013, she performed the former song live for the first time at the KeyArena with The Postal Service. She has also collaborated vocally with The Black Heart Procession and Joan of Arc, to name a few.

Her second full-length album, Finds You in Love was released on September 14, 2010 to critical acclaim.

On October 14, 2014, Wood released her third full-length album, Wilderness.

In 2023, Jen Wood toured with The Postal Service and Death Cab for Cutie during their 20th Anniversary Tour, celebrating the releases of Give Up and Transatlanticism, respectively. She performed her vocals from The Postal Service's "Nothing Better".

== Discography ==
- 1993: Tattle Tale (with Tattle Tale)
- 1995: Sew True (with Tattle Tale)
- 1996: No More Wading
- 1997: Getting Past the Static (1997)
- 2000: This Uncontainable Light (EP)
- 2002: Traveling through Roots
- 2003: Jen Wood (EP)
- 2010: Finds You in Love
- 2014: Wilderness

== Compilation Tracks ==
- Tree Southern Polyvinyl Sampler: "Imperfect"
- Post-Marked Stamps Compilation: "Sheltering Arms for the Birds"
- Try For Summer, Plan For Fall: "Circus"
- New Atmosphere for the Future: U.S. Pop Life, Volume 3: "Underestimation"
- Zum Audio Volume 2: "Believe Her"
