= Fair Ain't Fair =

Studio album by Tim Fite
- Released: May 6, 2008
- Genres: Rock, folk, hip-hop
- Length: 46:43
- Label: Anti-

Tim Fite chronology
It's Only Ketchup (2007)	Fair Ain't Fair (2008)	Change of Heart (2009)

Professional ratings
Review scores
Source	Rating
AllMusic	4/5 stars
Paste	(favorable)
PopMatters	7/10 stars
Punknews.org	4/5 stars
Spin	3.5/5 stars

Fair Ain't Fair is Tim Fite's second studio album released on Anti-. As with Gone Ain't Gone, Fite created this album with a mixture of real instrumentation and sampling, resulting in a sound composed of rock, folk and hip-hop elements.

Franz Nicolay, of the Hold Steady, listed the album among his favourite albums of 2008.

== Track listing ==
All songs written by T. Sullivan, except "Harriet Tubman" (T. Sullivan/C. Lind)

1. "Roots of a Tree" (1:54)
2. "Trouble" (3:26)
3. "The Barber" (3:25)
4. "Big Mistake" (3:28)
5. "Inside Man" (2:02)
6. "Rats and Rags" (3:25)
7. "Yesterday's Garden" (3:14)
8. "Thought I Was a Gun" (2:03)
9. "The Names of All the Animals" (4:24)
10. "Motorcade" (1:37)
11. "More Clothes" (3:28)
12. "Harriet Tubman" (1:36)
13. "My Hands" (4:00)
14. "Heaven Is War" (1:46)
15. "Sing Along" (3:29)
16. "Line by Line" (3:26)

== Samples ==
- "Roots of a Tree" samples the song "Kettle" by Frances
- "Trouble" samples the song "When We Were Wolves" by My Latest Novel
- "The Barber" samples the song "Spin Me Around" by Kip Boardman
- "Big Mistake" samples the song "Kitty and Her Beautiful Lady" by Remate
- "Motorcade" samples the song "Black Holes" by Needle
- "Yesterday's Garden" samples the song "Whistle and Water" by East Ghost West Ghost
- "More Clothes" samples the song "Bubbles" by Trunk Federation
- "My Hands" samples the song "I Can't Fall Asleep" by Picastro
- "Sing Along" samples the song "Poison" by Constantines

== Major contributors ==
- Dr. Leisure – Tape sounds, singing, live show
- Rob Bedenoch – Engineering, audio tweaking
- Justin Riddle – Drums, percussion
- Shawna Enyart – Elephants
- Chris Lind – Slack key guitar
- Andy, Matt, and Anti- – Business
- Jacob Harris – Management
- Dan Kinsley – Guitar, piano, mandolin
- Ryan Foregger – Video specialization
- Adam Gustavson – Guitar, banjo, pedal steel, bass
- Dan Saks – Guitar
- Merle Hansen – Viola
- Pepi Ginsberg – singing
- Shars Worden – singing, ghosting
- The Bloody Nose Boys – singing
- Danielle Stech Homsy – singing
- Dave Kutch – Mastering
- Tim Fite – Everything else and nothing else
