= The Softies =

Band

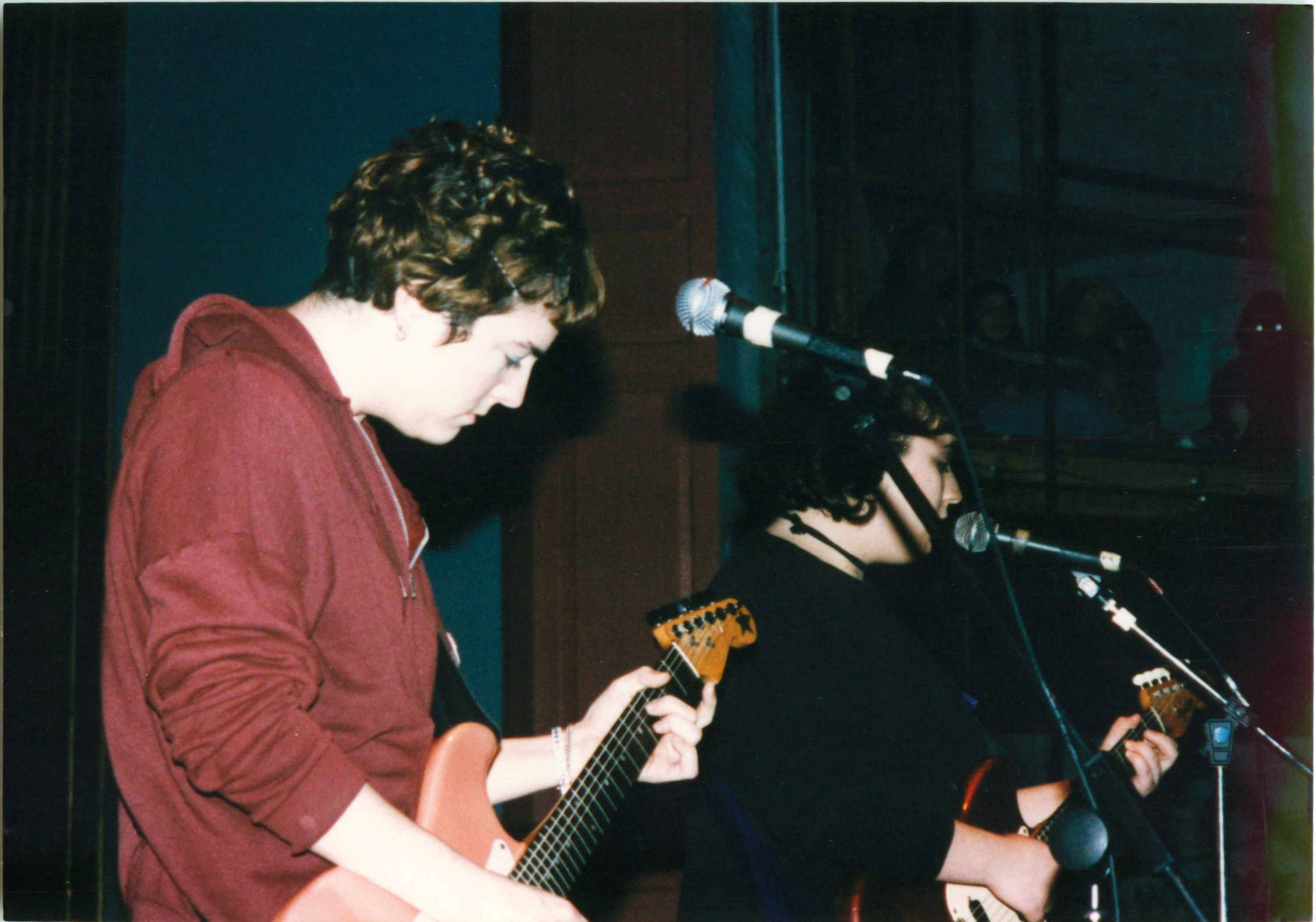
- The Softies onstage at Yoyo A Gogo in 1997

Background information
- Origin: Portland, Oregon
- Genres: Indie pop, cuddlecore
- Years active: 1994–2000, 2012, 2018, 2023–present
- Members: Rose Melberg; Jen Sbragia

The Softies is a musical duo consisting of Rose Melberg and Jen Sbragia, who are known for their minimal approach to pop music.

== History ==
=== Formation and original album run (1994–2000) ===
Beginning in 1994, the band was intended to be a side project for both artists. Along with an eventual career as a solo artist, Rose Melberg performed with Tiger Trap, Gaze, and Go Sailor. Jen Sbragia was known for her work with the band Pretty Face. Sbragia first approached Melberg shortly following a Tiger Trap concert in Sacramento, and the two began collaborating after Tiger Trap disbanded in January 1994.

The pair formed The Softies, a name deriving from a UK new wave group, and recorded the four-song “Love Seat” 7-inch single for Slumberland Records. Shortly after the single's release, Melberg and Sbragia relocated to Portland, Oregon. Calvin Johnson later produced their “He’ll Never Have To Know” single and the band’s debut album It’s Love on the K Records label.

They released an eponymous EP under Slumberland Records in 1996 (recorded before It's Love). Within months, they would record their critically acclaimed full-length Winter Pageant in Melberg’s childhood home in Sacramento, California.

In 2000, they released their final record with K Records, Holiday in Rhode Island. It is sometimes speculated that their albums correspond with the seasons of the year as follows: It's Love (Summer), The Softies (Autumn), Winter Pageant (Winter), Holiday in Rhode Island (Spring).

The band undertook a few tours, including as an opening act for singer/songwriter Elliott Smith.

=== Reformation and later album (2012–present) ===
For the first time since 2000, the Softies toured as part of Chickfactor 2012: For the Love of Pop, with shows in Brooklyn, Portland and San Francisco.

In 2018 the Softies played live again for a benefit concert in Vancouver.

In 2024 the band released The Bed I Made on Father/Daughter Records, their first album in 24 years, and toured North America with Tony Molina.

== Musical style ==
The Softies are known for their delicate instrumentation and intimate lyricisms. Describing them as a "true indie pop" act, AllMusic said the band "live up to their name by crafting quiet, intimate songs that come directly from the heart with no stops along the way." They almost exclusively use two electric guitars and harmonizing vocal melodies for their recorded tracks and live performances, with their prominence in the 1990s Portland music scene being attributed to their "quieter" style. Though the band's music is sometimes categorized as twee pop, Melberg has eschewed the description in favor of indie pop, saying in 2024 that twee was: "not a word we feel connected to."

== Discography ==
=== LPs ===
- It's Love (1995 - LP/CD - K Records - KLP43)
- Winter Pageant (1997 - LP/CD - K Records - KLP61)
- Holiday In Rhode Island (2000 - LP/CD - K Records)
- The Bed I Made (2024 - Father/Daughter Records)

=== Singles & EPs ===
- Loveseat (1994 - 7" 4 track EP - Slumberland Records)
- He'll Never Have to Know (1995 - 7" - K Records - IPU56)
- The Softies (1996 - 10" - Slumberland Records)
- The Best Days (1996 - 7" - K Records - IPU79)
