= Fome Is Dape =

2001 studio album by Little-T and One Track Mike

Studio album by Little-T and One Track Mike
- Released: July 17, 2001
- Genre: Hip-hop
- Length: 59:58
- Label: Lava/Atlantic Records
- Producer: One Track Mike

Professional ratings
Review scores
| Source | Rating |
|---|---|
| AllMusic | 3/5 stars |

Fome Is Dape is the only studio album by American hip-hop duo Little-T and One Track Mike. It was released in 2001 via Lava Records.

The single "Shaniqua" was a hit. It made the top ten on MTV's Total Request Live.

== Critical reception ==
The Honolulu Star-Bulletin called the album "one of the year's more pleasant surprises".

== Track listing ==
1. Intro – 1:11
2. "Fome Is Dape" – 3:19
3. "Immune" – 3:25
4. "Wings" – 4:05
5. "Loosendin'" – 3:48
6. "Kick in the Ass" – 4:01
7. "Sammy" – 4:04
8. "A Little More" – 3:40 featuring Shank Bone Mystic
9. "Untitled" – 0:20
10. "J" – 3:20
11. "Only When It Rains" – 3:29
12. "Guidance Counselor" – 3:01 featuring Slick Rick
13. "Shaniqua" – 3:15
14. "Deadman" – 4:01 featuring Shank Bone Mystic
15. "Sycamore Trees" – 4:19
16. "Outro" – 10:36
  - Includes the hidden track "Little-T and One Track Mike Are Famous," beginning at 6:00 into the song.

== Sampler track listings ==
=== Sampler 1 ===
1. "Fome Is Dape"
2. "Loosendin'"

=== Sampler 2 ===
1. "Intro" (0:51)
2. "Guidance Counselor" (3:23)
3. "Loosendin'" (4:36)
