= Under the Table Tennis =

Studio album by Tim Fite
- Released: 18 May 2010
- Genres: Rock, hip-hop
- Length: 39:19

Tim Fite chronology
Change of Heart (2009)	Under the Table Tennis (2010)	Ain't Ain't Ain't (2012)

Under the Table Tennis is Tim Fite's ninth album.

Like a number of his previous albums, it was released free of charge on his website.

== Track listing ==
1. "For-Closure" (2:57)
2. "Oversight" (1:09)
3. "Someone Threw the Baby Out" (4:20)
4. "Not Covred" (3:08)
5. "Jobs" (2:57)
6. "ExExEx" (1:57)
7. "No Notice" (2:26)
8. "Never Lay Down" (3:46)
9. "Money Back" (3:36)
10. "Napkin" (1:38)
11. "Go Sell It on the Mountain" (3:19)
12. "WYNPM" (3:17)
13. "Support Tim Fite" (1:28)
14. "We Didn't Warn You" (3:29)
