= D.I.Y. or Die: How to Survive as an Independent Artist =

- Directed by: Michael W. Dean
- Produced by: Michael W. Dean
- Starring: Lydia Lunch; Ian MacKaye; J Mascis; Jim Rose; J. G. Thirlwell
- Cinematography: Peter Spicer
- Edited by: Miles Montalbano
- Music by: Fugazi
- Distributed by: Music Video Distributors (MVD)
- Release date: 2002
- Running time: 55 minutes
- Country: United States
- Language: English
- Budget: $5000

D.I.Y. or Die: How to Survive as an Independent Artist is a low-budget documentary film released by Music Video Distributors in 2002. The film is a "celebration of the underdog" and deals with why artists do what they do, regardless of the lack of a continuous paycheck.

== Details ==
The film features some artists that define the DIY ethic and speaks to the overall DIY culture. It features interviews with Lydia Lunch, Ian MacKaye, J Mascis of Dinosaur Jr, Jim Rose, J. G. Thirlwell of Foetus, Mike Watt, Eric McFadden, Richard Kern (filmmaker), Ron Asheton of The Stooges, Madigan Shive of Bonfire Madigan, Lynn Breedlove of Tribe 8 and Dave Brockie of Gwar, among others.

Alicia Dattner appears in the credit sequence as a punk street artist stapling DIY flyers. Original artwork for the credits drawn by Attaboy, co-founder of Hi-Fructose Contemporary Art Magazine.

The DVD was released (under the title "D.I.Y. or Die: Burn This DVD") with no region restrictions or copy protection. Director Michael W. Dean allowed and even encouraged people to make copies for non-commercial use.
