= Jules Labarthe =

American film producer

Jules Labarthe is a cinematographer, film producer and photographer. He studied film at New York University. He met director Jamie Babbit in a coffee shop in Los Angeles and as a result of this meeting was the cinematographer on her 1996 short film Frog Crossing. He has collaborated with Babbit on several other projects including her 1999 feature film But I'm a Cheerleader. He has been the cinematographer on MTV's Undressed and new ABC Family series Greek. He has also produced two short films and one feature, Too Pure (1998).

== Filmography ==
=== Cinematographer ===
- 1996: Frog Crossing (short, dir. Jamie Babbit and Ari Gold)
- 1998: Stray Bullet (dir. Rob Spera)
- 1998: Too Pure (dir. Sunmin Park)
- 1999: The Lovely Leave (short, dir. Claire Stansfield)
- 1999: Sleeping Beauties (short, dir. Jamie Babbit)
- 1999: Undressed (TV)
- 1999: But I'm a Cheerleader (dir. Jamie Babbit)
- 2000: Turbans (short, dir. Erika S. Andersen)
- 2004: Going Upriver: The Long War of John Kerry (dir. George Butler)
- 2004: A Memoir to My Former Self (short, dir. Jamie Babbit)
- 2007: Greek (TV)

=== Producer ===
- 1998: Too Pure
- 1999: The Lovely Leave
- 2000: Turbans
