= Go Sailor =

American twee pop group

- Origin: Berkeley, California
- Genres: Twee pop, cuddlecore
- Labels: Yoyo Recordings, Lookout!
- Past members: Rose Melberg; Paul Curran; Amy Linton

Go Sailor was a short-lived San Francisco and Sacramento based twee pop band. Its members included Rose Melberg of Tiger Trap and The Softies (guitar, vocals), Paul Curran of Crimpshrine (bass) and Amy Linton of Henry's Dress (later of The Aislers Set) (drums). They recorded three 7-inch singles and an album on Lookout! Records in 1996, the latter of which collected the singles tracks and two compilation appearances. After their breakup their songs "Ray of Sunshine" and "Together Forever in Love" were included on the soundtrack to the movie But I'm a Cheerleader.

They reformed for Slumberland Records's 20th anniversary in 2010, followed by the label reissuing their compilation album.

The band reformed again to play at the 2024 edition of Mosswood Meltdown in Oakland.

== Musical style ==
Go Sailor was an indie pop act performing a fusion of twee pop and punk rock. AllMusic opined that the group perfected the "twee punk" style and observed the band's influence within other subsequent waves of indie rock.

== Discography ==
- Fine Day for Sailing 7-inch EP (Yoyo Recordings, 1994)
- Long Distance 7-inch EP (Slumberland, 1995)
- Don't Go 7-inch EP (Lookout! Records, 1996)
- Go Sailor (Lookout! Records, 1996) – This release compiles the three 7-inch EPs plus two compilation tracks.
- Go Sailor (Slumberland, 2011) - This vinyl-only album compiles all three of their singles plus compilation tracks, similar to the Lookout! Records CD issued in 1996.
- "Long Distance (Alternate Mix)" 7-inch single (Slumberland, 2011) - This vinyl-only single sided record was released for the 20th anniversary of Slumberland Records. (on army green vinyl)

=== Compilations ===
- "Last Year" on Periscope, Yoyo Recordings (1994)
