= Stuck (2001 film) =

2001 film by Jamie Babbit

- Opening film title
- Directed by: Jamie Babbit
- Written by: Kelly Souders
- Produced by: Laurie Hansen; Andrea Sperling
- Starring: Jennie Ventriss; Jeanette Miller; Eden Sher
- Cinematography: M. David Mullen
- Edited by: Jim Rhoads
- Music by: Ethan Gold
- Production company: POWER UP films
- Release date: December 9, 2001
- Running time: 7 minutes
- Country: United States
- Language: English

Stuck is a 2001 short film directed by Jamie Babbit and starring Jennie Ventriss, Jeanette Miller, and Eden Sher. It tells the story of an elderly lesbian couple traveling across the desert, who are on the verge of ending their unhappy relationship. It was the first film produced by production company POWER UP and won three film festival awards.

== Plot ==
An elderly woman, Fern (Jeanette Miller), wakes up her girlfriend Irma (Jennie Ventriss). As they get ready to go to a bridge game, a young girl (Eden Sher) rides a scooter down a desert road. Irma makes a lime Jell-O dessert, which Fern is rude about. As Irma drives down the road on their way to the game, Fern berates her for driving too fast. They start arguing and their truck hits the young girl on the scooter. Fern gets out of the truck, announces that the girl is dead, and starts shouting at Irma, insisting that she get out and have a look. Irma locks the truck doors. Fern continues shouting and starts smashing the truck headlights, while Irma refuses to speak or open the doors. Fern threatens to end their 45-year relationship, and when she receives no answer, she takes her ring from her ring finger, throws it at the truck, and walks off down the road. After some time, Irma opens the truck windows and smiles to herself.

== Distribution and awards ==
Stuck premiered on December 9, 2001, and played at the 2002 Sundance Film Festival. It features on Girls on Film, a DVD compilation of short films released by production company POWER UP. In 2002, Stuck won the Jury Prize at the Philadelphia International Gay & Lesbian Film Festival and an Honorable Mention at the Sundance Film Festival. At the 16th London Lesbian & Gay Film Festival, it won the Film4 Prize for Best Short Film. Later that year the "wacky lesbian geriatric melodrama" won the Grand Prize at the PlanetOut.com Short Movie Awards.
