= Katrina Phillips =

American actress and activist

Katrina Phillips is an American actress and activist. She has served as the Chair of Sonoma County, California's Human Rights Commission since July 2022. She has also worked as a counselor for at-risk youth at the Los Angeles LGBT Center, and began volunteering with Sonoma & Napa Pet Rescue and Reunification following the Tubbs Fire in 2017.

== Education ==
Phillips graduated from DePaul University in Chicago, Illinois. She was a member of the university's Theatre School, and performed in the school's stage production The Yellow Boat in 1996.

== Partial filmography ==
=== Film ===
Year	Film	Role	Ref(s)
1999	Payback	Teller	
1999	But I'm a Cheerleader	Jan	

=== Television ===
Year	Film	Role	Notes
2003	Fastlane	Neve the Butch	Episode: "Strap On"
2003	The District	Paula	Episode: "Free Byrd"
2004	The Division	Officer Sheila Brown	Episode: "Rush to the Door"
2005	Blind Justice	Helen Hess	Episode: "Doggone"
