= Payback (1999 film) =

1999 film by Brian Helgeland

- Theatrical release poster
- Directed by: Brian Helgeland
- Screenplay by: Terry Hayes
- Based on: The Hunter by Richard Stark
- Produced by: Bruce Davey
- Starring: Mel Gibson; Gregg Henry; Maria Bello; David Paymer
- Cinematography: Ericson Core
- Edited by: Kevin Stitt
- Music by: Chris Boardman
- Production company: Icon Productions
- Distributed by: Paramount Pictures; Warner Bros.
- Release date: February 5, 1999
- Running time: 101 minutes
- Country: United States
- Language: English
- Budget: $50 million
- Box office: $161.6 million

Payback is a 1999 American action thriller film written and directed by Brian Helgeland in his directorial debut, and starring Mel Gibson, Gregg Henry, Maria Bello, Lucy Liu, Deborah Kara Unger, David Paymer, James Coburn and Kris Kristofferson. It is based on the novel The Hunter by Donald E. Westlake using the pseudonym Richard Stark, which had earlier been adapted into the 1967 film Point Blank.

During post-production, Helgeland was removed by Gibson and the producers, who rewrote and reshot substantial portions of the film, including a different third act and a new villain played by Kris Kristofferson. This version of the film was released by Paramount Pictures on February 5, 1999, and received mixed reviews from critics.

In 2006, Helgeland issued a director's cut, entitled Payback: Straight Up – The Director's Cut, that differs substantially from the version released by the studio.

== Plot ==
Professional criminals Porter and Val Resnick steal $140,000 from a local Chinese Triad. Val betrays Porter, revealing that he needs almost the entire sum to repay his way into the Outfit, the criminal organization controlling the city. Porter is then shot by his wife, Lynn, whom Val has deceived into believing Porter was having an affair with high-end escort Rosie. Left for dead, Porter survives.

Months later, after recovering, Porter sets out to reclaim his $70,000 share. He confronts Lynn and finds her severely addicted to drugs. He destroys her supply in an attempt to help her quit, but she uses a hidden stash and dies of an overdose the next morning. Suspecting Val was funding her addiction, Porter interrogates her dealer, who directs him to Val's middleman, Stegman. Porter orders Stegman to tell Val that he wants his money, then tracks down Rosie, who tells him Val is staying at the Outfit-owned Oakwood Arms hotel.

Porter infiltrates the hotel and ambushes Val during a session with Pearl, a Triad-connected dominatrix. Val explains that he no longer has the money because he gave it to the Outfit. Porter beats him and orders him to produce the $70,000 the next day. Carter, a senior Outfit member, tells Val to dispose of Porter or be killed himself, while secretly sending his henchman Phil to handle Porter. Val has Pearl inform the Triads that Porter stole their money, prompting them to ambush him and run him down with a car. Before they can kill him, corrupt detectives Hicks and Leary intervene, having learned about Porter's pursuit from Stegman, and demand a share of the money in exchange for not implicating him in Lynn's death.

Porter recuperates at Rosie's apartment. She asks why he left her years earlier, and he explains that after they first slept together, he had to drive her to an escort appointment. Rosie replies that he could have taken her somewhere else. After Porter leaves, Val forces his way inside, injures her dog, and attempts to rape her before Porter returns and shoots him. Realizing Val cannot repay him, Porter forces him to reveal the names of Outfit bosses Fairfax and Carter, then kills him. Porter takes Rosie to his secret apartment for safety, but when the phone rings despite nobody knowing the location, he discovers a bomb wired to it and spots Phil waiting outside in a car. Porter sneaks down, cuts the fuel line, and ignites the leaking fuel, killing Phil in the resulting explosion.

Outside Carter's office, Porter meets Hicks, Leary, and Stegman, who also demands a cut. Porter hands Leary the revolver he used to kill Val, ostensibly for safekeeping, while ensuring Leary's fingerprints are left on it. Porter then confronts Carter and forces him to contact Bronson, the head of the Outfit. Porter demands his $70,000, but Bronson refuses, so Porter kills Carter. Outside, he retrieves the revolver and plants it with Val's body alongside Hicks's stolen badge, framing the detectives.

Porter next plans to kidnap Bronson's son, Johnny. En route, echoing their earlier conversation, Rosie says she should have quit escorting, and Porter replies that he should have driven her somewhere else. With Rosie's help, Porter abducts Johnny and later reveals this to Bronson while threatening Fairfax. Hicks and Leary, who are watching nearby, are arrested by Internal Affairs, while Stegman briefly captures Porter before the Triads arrive and kill him. Porter kills the remaining Triad members, except Pearl, before being captured by the Outfit.

Fairfax has Porter brutally beaten, but he refuses to reveal Johnny's location. Bronson arrives with the ransom and vows that Porter will never touch it. His men crush Porter's toes with a hammer until he finally gives them an address leading to his apartment. Bronson, Fairfax, and their men enter while Porter remains tied in the car trunk. Porter breaks free and uses the car phone to call the apartment. Bronson answers, triggering the bomb Phil planted earlier and killing everyone inside. With Johnny left restrained elsewhere, Rosie and Porter drive away with the money to begin a new life.

== Cast ==
- Mel Gibson as Porter
- Gregg Henry as Val Resnick
- Maria Bello as Rosie
- Lucy Alexis Liu as Pearl
- Deborah Kara Unger as Lynn Porter
- David Paymer as Arthur Stegman
- Bill Duke as Detective Hicks
- Jack Conley as Detective Leary
- John Glover as Phil
- William Devane as Carter
- James Coburn as Justin Fairfax
- Kris Kristofferson as Bronson
- Trevor St. John as Johnny Bronson
- Katrina Phillips as Teller
- Freddy Rodriguez as Valet
- Manu Tupou as Pawnbroker

== Production ==
The film was shot from September to November 1997, in Chicago and Los Angeles, though neither city is referred to in the film.

Mel Gibson stated in a short interview released as a DVD extra that it "would've been ideal to shoot in black and white." He noted that "people want a color image" and that the actual film used a bleach bypass process to tint the film. In addition to this, the production design used muted shades of red, brown, and grey for costumes, sets, and cars for further effect.

=== Re-shoots and re-editing ===
Although credited as director, Brian Helgeland's cut of the film was not the theatrical version released to audiences. Helgeland clashed with Mel Gibson over Gibson's ideas for the film. After the end of principal photography, Gibson admitted that he was instrumental in having Helgeland removed as director before the film was released.

A script rewrite by Terry Hayes was ordered. There was initially some uncertainty on who directed the reshoots, with some sources claiming it was the production designer John Myhre. However, Paul Abascal has stated on his website that he in fact directed the new scenes. The new director reshot 30% of the film. The intent was to make the Porter character accessible; as such, the film's tagline became: "Get Ready to Root for the Bad Guy."

A potentially controversial scene between Porter and Lynn which arguably involves spousal abuse was excised and more plot elements were added to the third act. After 10 days of reshoots, a new opening scene and voiceover track also were added, and Kris Kristofferson walked on as a new villain.

== Reception ==
=== Box office ===
Payback was well received at the box office. The film made $21,221,526 in its opening weekend in North America. It eventually grossed $81,526,121 in North America and $80,100,000 in other territories, totaling $161,626,121 worldwide.

=== Critical reception ===
On review aggregation website Rotten Tomatoes, 56% of 77 critics gave Payback a positive review, with an average rating of 5.9/10. The website's critical consensus states, "Sadistic violence and rote humor saddle a predictable action premise." Metacritic assigned the film a weighted average score of 46 out of 100, based on 18 critics, indicating "mixed or average reviews". Audiences polled by CinemaScore gave the film an average grade of "B−" on an A+ to F scale.

Roger Ebert gave the film a three out of four stars, writing in his review: "There is much cleverness and ingenuity in Payback, but Mel Gibson is the key. The movie wouldn't work with an actor who was heavy on his feet, or was too sincere about the material."

=== Legacy ===
Dan Houser and James Worrall cited Payback as a primary influence in creating the 2001 video game Grand Theft Auto III.

== Director's cut ==
Helgeland's version, Straight Up: The Director's Cut, was released on DVD, Blu-ray, and HD DVD on April 10, 2007, after an October 2006 run at the Austin Film Festival. The Director's Cut version features a female Bronson (who is never seen but only heard over the phone voiced by Sally Kellerman), does not include the voice-over by Porter and several Bronson-related scenes, and has a different film score composed by Scott Stambler. The film also features alternative color grading, and does not utilize the bleach bypass process present in the theatrical cut.

During their scuffle (which is longer than in the theatrical version and was the main source of controversy), Porter earlier tells Lynn that his picture with Rosie was taken before they met, thereby rendering her jealousy unjustified. This version has an entirely different, ambiguous ending where Porter is seriously wounded in a train station shootout and driven off by Rosie.

A June 4, 2012, look at "movies improved by directors' cuts" by The A.V. Club described Payback: Straight Up as "a marked improvement on the unrulier original."
