= Jeanette Miller =

American character actress

- Born: July 30, 1932; Pensacola, Florida, U.S.
- Died: November 4, 2016 (aged 84); Valley Village, California, U.S.
- Occupation: Actress
- Years active: 1955–2016
- Television: The Middle (2009–2015); Dexter (2006); Friends (1998–1999)

Jeanette Miller (July 30, 1932 – November 4, 2016) was an American character actress who appeared in theatre, film, and television series, best known as Aunt Edie on the ABC comedy series The Middle, which she played from 2009 until 2015, when her character was said to have died from old age. In film, she appeared in Cold Heaven, The Truman Show, Norbit, Four Christmases, and Legion.

== Death ==
Miller died on November 4, 2016.

== Filmography ==
=== Features ===
Year	Title	Role	Notes
1982	Heart, Soul and Plastic	Elderly woman	Short film; First film role
1991	Cold Heaven	Sister Katarina	
1998	The Truman Show	Senior citizen	
1999	Austin Powers: The Spy Who Shagged Me	Teacher	
2001	Corky Romano	Phyllis	
2001	The Medicine Show	Old Lady	
2001	Not Another Teen Movie	Grandma Briggs	
2001	Stuck	Fern	
2002	Duty Dating	Louise	
2002	The Third Wheel	Elderly woman	
2002	Stealing Harvard	Grandma	
2002	The Warriors of the 14th Fairway	Mona	Short film
2007	Norbit	Mrs. Coleman	
2008	Quality Time	Talk Show Guest	
2008	Four Christmases	Gram-Gram	
2010	Legion	Gladys Foster	
2011	The Change-Up	Grandma Taylor	Final film role

=== Television ===
Year	Title	Role	Notes
1955	Lux Video Theatre	Patty	Episode: "Forever Female"
1984	Riptide	Aunt Nellie	Episode: "Diamonds Are For Never"
1984	Hardcastle and McCormick	Lady in restaurant	Episode: "Whatever Happened to Guts?"
1985	Finder of Lost Love	Woman	Episode: "Connections"
1986	Circle of Violence: A Family Drama	Woman singer	TV Movie
1986	Throb	Lady singer	Episode: "Bus of Dreams"
1987	Beauty and the Beast	Old Woman #2	Episode: "Siege"
1988	Night Court	Kitten Latouche	Episode: "Harry and the Tamp"
1988	The Diamond Trap	Mrs. Valin	TV Movie
1989	Quantum Leap	Old Lady	Episode: "Play It Again, Seymour - April 14, 1953"
1989	Designing Women	Evelyn	Episode: "The Wilderness Experience"
1991	Flesh 'n' Blood	Doris	Episode: "Pulling out the Weeds"
1991	Murphy Brown	Secretary	Episode: "Uh-Oh Part 2"
1992	Designing Women	Elderly woman	Episode: "Love Letters"
1992	Hearts Afire	Mrs. Richmom	Episode: "While the Thomasons Slept"
1993	Evening Shade	Virginia Clockey	Episode: "Wood and Evan's Excellent Adventure"
1994	ER	Flora	Episode: "The Gift"
1995	Saved by the Bell: The New Class	Mrs. Frumkin	Episode: "Screech's Millions"
1995	MADtv	Grandma	1 Episode
1995	Murphy Brown	Elderly woman	Episode: "The Humboldt Doldt"
1996	Step by Step	Mrs. Whitney	Episode: "Beautiful Ladies of Wrestling"
1996	MADtv	Elderly juror	1 episode
1996	Wings	Grammy Lynch	Episode: "Lynch Party"
1996	Coach	Old woman	Episode: "Somebody's Babe"
1996	Malcolm & Eddie	The Old Lady	Episode: "Little Sister"
1996	A Case of Life	Demonstrator	TV Movie
1997	Star Trek: Voyager	The Woman	Episode: "Random Thoughts"
1998	Seinfeld	Old woman	Episode: "The Wizard"
1998	Clueless	Claire	Episode: "Friends"
1998	Suddenly Susan	Susan	Episode: "Birds Do It, Bees Do It, Even Some of These Do It"
1998	The Brian Benben Show	Betty Bolinski	Episode: "Pilot"
1998	The Tony Danza Show	Mrs. Naufman	Episode: " Take This Job And..."
1998	Melrose Place	Eve's Grandmother	Episode: "Lethal Wedding 4"
1998	Friends	Elderly woman	Episode: "The One with the Inappropriate Sister" (Uncredited)
1999	Home Improvement	Volunteer	Episode: "Love's Labor Lost: Part 2"
1999	Replacing Dad	Miss Pugh	TV Movie
1999	Friends	Lurker	2 episodes
1999	Just Shoot Me!	Mrs. Collins	Episode: "Finch Gets Dick"
1999	The Pretender	Zoe's Grandmother	Episode: "Road Trip"
1999	The Norm Show	Troop Leader	Episode: "Norm vs Christmas"
2000	Charmed	Adult Christina Larson	Episode: "Pardon My Past"
2000	Becker	Mrs. Bayer	Episode: "SuperBob"
2001	Jack & Jill	Old Woman	Episode: "What Weddings Do to People" (Uncredited)
2001	Providence	Aunt Mary	Episode: "Meet Joe Connelly"
2001-2002	100 Deeds for Eddie McDowd	Crazy Grandma Taylor	3 episodes
2002	Sabrina, the Teenage Witch	Mildred	Episode: "Free Sabrina"
2002	MDs	Bernice	Episode: "Wing and a Prayer"
2003	The Bernie Mac Show	Old Woman	Episode: "Maid Man"
2003	SpongeBob SquarePants	Mrs. Johnson (voice)	Episode: "The Sponge Who Could Fly"
2004	I'm with Her	Lillian	Episode: "Poison Ivy" (Uncredited)
2004	The Shield	Isabel Nelson	Episode: "Bottom Bitch"
2004	Malcolm in the Middle	Elderly Woman	Episode: "Kitty's Back"
2004	According to Jim	Woman in Parking Lot	Episode: "Stalking Santa"
2005	My Name Is Earl	Woman with purse	Episode: "Randy's Touchdown"
2006	Kitchen Confidential	Very Old Lady	Episode: "Let's Do Brunch"
2006	My Name Is Earl	Bus Stop Lady	Episode: "The Professor"
2006	Dexter	Elderly Neighbor	Episode: "Father Knows Best"
2007	Scrubs	Betty	Episode: "My No Good Reason"
2008	Carpoolers	Mrs. Ducketts	2 episodes
2009	ER	Beverly	Episode: "And in the End..."
2009	10 Things I Hate About You	Verna	Episode: "Light My Fire"
2009-2012	The Middle	Aunt Edie Freehold	16 episodes
2010	Elevator Girl	Lenore	TV Movie
2010	Brothers & Sisters	Louise	Episode: "Cold Turkey"
2011	Perfect Couples	Memaw	2 episodes
