= Rio en Medio =

American singer and ukulelist

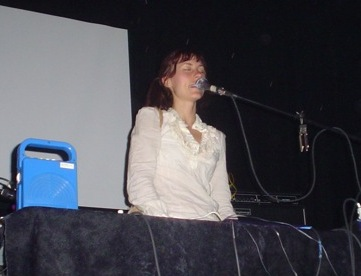
- Rio en Medio performing in 2007

Background information
- Born: Danielle Stech-Homsy; New Mexico
- Origin: Brooklyn, New York City, United States
- Genres: New Weird America; Freak folk
- Years active: 2007–2015
- Labels: Gnomonsong, Manimal Vinyl, Womens Work Recordings
- Website: www.daniellestech-homsy.com

Danielle Stech-Homsy, known by her pseudonym Rio en Medio (Spanish for river in between), is an American singer and baritone ukulelist.

== Career ==
Stech-Homsy was born in New Mexico, and was raised in California and Arizona. Later, she moved to Brooklyn. She began to perform and record original compositions, eventually recording The Bride of Dynamite (originally titled A Bride's Guide to Waiting Music). A friend passed the record to Devendra Banhart who soon requested to release it on his label (Gnomonsong). Since her debut release in early 2007, Stech-Homsy has worked with artists such as Grizzly Bear, CocoRosie, Brightblack Morning Light, Vetiver, Patrick Wolf, Vashti Bunyan, Tim Fite and Banhart.

In 2008, Stech-Homsy recorded a cover of "Pictures of You" by The Cure for Perfect as Cats: A Tribute to The Cure.

Rio en Medio's third album, Peace Sequence, was released in 2013 on the label Womens Work Recordings.

She has since moved on from her Rio en Medio project, and currently is operating out of Portland creating music under The Blue Knots.

== Musical style ==
Overall, Stech-Homsy's music falls into the freak folk genre. Writing for Pitchfork, Matthew Murphy described The Bride of Dynamite as "ethereal" with "delicate" vocals, but concluded it was overall "halting, hesitant baby steps" for Stech-Homsy. Later, Joshua Klein wrote that her second album, Frontier, is "indulgent and confounding" and "part cosmic fun house, part haunted house".

In an Identity Theory interview, Danielle said she considers her music something which is entwined with her own personal process, reflected in her laissez-faire approach to how her music reaches public audiences. Overall, her work is experimental, interdisciplinary, and collaborative. In the same interview, she also expresses the preference that "I like recording blind, for instance- meaning I will record a track against several muted tracks, then unmute and see what it sounds like."

== Discography ==
=== Albums ===
- The Bride of Dynamite (2007)
- Frontier (2008)
- Peace Sequence (2012)
- Rio en Medio Radio (2015)

=== Singles ===
- 2008: "Fall Up"/"Heartless"
- 2008: "Let's Groove"/"Staying Alive"
