= Sleeping Beauties (film) =

1999 film by Jamie Babbit

- Opening title
- Directed by: Jamie Babbit
- Produced by: Victoria Robinson; Andrea Sperling
- Starring: Sarah Lassez; Radha Mitchell
- Cinematography: Jules Labarthe
- Edited by: Dody Dorn
- Music by: Blake Leyh
- Release date: June 10, 1999
- Running time: 13 minutes
- Country: United States
- Language: English
- Budget: $10,000

Sleeping Beauties is a 1999 short comedy film directed by Jamie Babbit. It premiered at the 1998 Sundance Film Festival. It stars Sarah Lassez as a morgue beautician trying to get over her ex-girlfriend, played by Radha Mitchell. Babbit made the film with help from David Fincher and Michael Douglas. It played at several film festivals during 1998 and 1999, and was later distributed on a DVD collection of short films by production company POWER UP. Babbit won a Channel 4 award for the film.

== Plot ==
A mother tells her daughter a real life fairy tale of a "Princess Charming" and her Sleeping Beauty. Heather (Lassez) is in love with her girlfriend Cindy (Mitchell) until one day Cindy "wakes up" and breaks up with Heather, saying she wants a "real prince".

Heather works as a make up artist at Rolling Headstones Funeral Home in Los Angeles, "making dead rock-stars look good" for their next album covers. One day she is working on the body of musician Sno Blo (Rose McGowan). Her co-worker Vince (Vince Vieluf) brings his new girlfriend to the funeral home. It is Cindy, who is moving back to Los Angeles and wants to be friends with Heather.

Before Sno Blo is buried, the members of her band have a photo shoot with her at her grave side. Heather does the makeup. The photographer's assistant Clea (Clea DuVall) flirts with Heather and gives her her telephone number, but Heather can only think about Cindy. Cindy arrives with Vince and tries to persuade the remaining members of the band to let her be their manager. When Vince ruins the opportunity for her, she gets angry with him and tells Heather she'll be staying with her.

When Heather gets home, she finds Cindy sleeping in her bed. She kisses Cindy to wake her up, and asks for some kind of a response. Cindy tells Heather that she can kiss her if she wants to, but not to expect anything back from her. Heather tells Cindy to get out of her bed and telephones Clea. Later, Heather practices her makeup techniques on Clea and they kiss.

At the end, the narrator (Heather) is joined by Clea to finish telling the story to their daughter.

== Cast ==
- Sarah Lassez as Heather
- Radha Mitchell as Cindy, Heather's ex-girlfriend and Vince's new girlfriend
- Clea DuVall as Clea, photographer's assistant working on the Sno Blo photo shoot
- Vince Vieluf as Vince, Heather's co-worker at the funeral home
- Rose McGowan as Sno Blo, dead rock star
- Nicole Eggert as Sno Blo Band
- Leisha Hailey as Sno Blo band
- Chris Garnant as Sno Blo Band
- Bob Stephenson as Record Executive
- Tracy Grant as Record Executive
- Tony Friedkin as Still Photographer
- Harper Roisman as Priest
- Emily Sperling as Little Heather
- Cheyene O'Brian as Little Cindy

== Production ==
Director Jamie Babbit was a script supervisor on David Fincher's 1997 film The Game. While working on The Game, she discussed her idea for a short film based on a fairy tale with Fincher. He was interested in the project, and gave Babbit about 6,000 feet of 35mm film. His editor gave her free use of an Avid editing machine. The star of The Game, Michael Douglas, wrote to Paramount and asked them to give Babbit access to their costume department. As a result, she was able to make Sleeping Beauties for about $10,000. The soundtrack of Sleeping Beauties features the song "Pity Rock" by Madigan Shive.

== Distribution and reception ==
Sleeping Beauties premiered at the 1998 Sundance Film Festival and went on to play at over thirty film festivals including the Los Angeles Film Festival and the London Lesbian and Gay Film Festival. The film features on Girls on Film, a DVD compilation of short films released by production company POWER UP. Writing for The Village Voice, Amy Taubin called Sleeping Beauties an embryonic version of Babbit's feature debut But I'm a Cheerleader and said that it has a "raunchy edge" that But I'm a Cheerleader lacks. In 1999, Sleeping Beauties won the C4TX award for best short film from British television station Channel 4.
