= Tiger Trap =

1990s American twee-pop band

- Origin: Sacramento, California
- Genres: Twee pop, indie pop
- Years active: 1992–1993
- Label: K Records
- Spinoffs: The Softies; Go Sailor; Gaze
- Past members: Rose Melberg; Angela Loy; Heather Dunn; Jen Braun

Tiger Trap was an American twee-pop band formed in 1992 and composed of high school friends Angela Loy and Rose Melberg, with Heather Dunn and Jen Braun. The group recorded one album and one EP for K Records.

== History ==
The name "Tiger Trap" comes from the very first Calvin and Hobbes cartoon, and was used prior to the formation of the band by Rose Melberg for a solo set in 1991 at the first night of the International Pop Underground Convention, Love Rock Revolution Girl Style Now,. Melberg had not performed live before, and had intended to perform with a friend who had ultimately not been able to make it. Melberg wanted more than anything to record for K Records, while there she handed a demo tape to label owner Calvin Johnson.

As a band Tiger Trap was formed in Sacramento, California in 1992, by Melberg and fellow singer/guitarist Angela Loy, who had both attended the same high school. They soon recruited bassist Jen Braun, who Melberg had worked with at a Tower Records, and drummer Heather Dunn, who had been recommended by a friend. They managed to garner something of a cult following before disbanding only a year later.

Within weeks their debut single "Words and Smiles," a split release with Bratmobile on the Four Letter Words label, was released. Later the same year they released the "Supercrush" single on K Records, followed in 1993 by their self-titled debut LP. The album was produced by Calvin Johnson. It sold about 10,000 copies, the most of any release on K up to that point. They followed this with one more EP, Sour Grass.

Their last concert took place at Bottom of the Hill, San Francisco, in December 1993. Bands they played with while active included Heavenly, Unwound, Shadowy Men on a Shadowy Planet, Girl Trouble, Mecca Normal, Beat Happening, and Tsunami. Melberg went on to become a solo artist as well as playing with the bands The Softies, Go Sailor, and Gaze. Dunn went on to play drums with Lois, the reformed Raincoats, and Dub Narcotic Sound System.

== Legacy ==
Along with Beat Happening, Lois, Tullycraft, and Black Tambourine, Tiger Trap is considered to be one of the most influential bands of the American twee pop movement.

Rob Sheffield for Rolling Stone called them "a pioneering indie-pop outfit of four women", and described their style as "hugely influential"; "vintage dresses, barrettes, lunchboxes, Hello Kitty gear — as code to express new ideas about sexuality and gender".

Maria Sherman for NPR said "Tiger Trap's joyful redolence was immediately revolutionary to my ears. The album was a courageous explication of women's benevolent desires, a collection of songs that offered cradling sympathy, what I recognized as a compassionate objection to an oppressive world."

== Discography ==
=== Studio albums ===
- Tiger Trap (K Records, 1993)

=== Singles and EPs ===
- "Words and Smiles" from a split 7-inch with Bratmobile (Four Letter Words Records, 1992)
- "Supercrush" b/w "You and Me" and "Hiding" (released as volume 36 of the International Pop Underground series, 1993)
- Sour Grass EP (K Records, 1993)
- "Alien Space Song" from split single with Henry's Dress (Slumberland Records, 1994)

=== Compilations and other appearances ===
- "Baby Blue", from Julep (Another Yoyo Studio Compilation) (Yoyo Recordings, 1993)
- "Hiding" re-released on the International Hip Swing compilation [assembled of songs from the International Pop Underground singles series] (K Records, 1993)
- "Supreme Nothing", from the Stars Kill Rock compilation (Kill Rock Stars, 1992)
- "Girl with a Guitar" from The Blood Orgy of the Leather Girls soundtrack (Planet Pimp Records, PPR-009, 1994)
