= It's Only Ketchup =

Studio album by Tim Fite
- Released: October 31, 2007
- Recorded: 2007
- Genre: Hip-hop
- Length: 17:17
- Label: Anti-

Tim Fite chronology
Over the Counter Culture (2006)	It's Only Ketchup (2007)	Fair Ain't Fair (2008)

It's Only Ketchup is an album released by Tim Fite. Like his previous release, Over the Counter Culture, the album was made available at Fite's website for free download. However, the album was only available on October 31, 2007—the day of Halloween. The album was, again, made available on October 31, 2008, along with a second Halloween-themed album, Ding-Dong DITCH!!!.

Musically, it is similar to Over the Counter Culture, eschewing the folk stylings of his studio albums and ending up as largely a hip-hop album.

The song "Slash Rules" is similar to the song "C.R.E.A.M." by Wu-Tang Clan.

== Track listing ==
All songs written by Tim Fite.

1. "Finders Keepers" (1:04)
2. "Slash Rules" (3:20)
3. "Trick or Treat" (3:19)
4. "We Look Good Together" (4:31)
5. "Get Up" (1:40)
6. "I Will Save Everything" (3:24)
