= Miisa =

Finnish Eurodance artist

Miisa-Leena Päällysaho (19 February 1970 – 7 July 2016), better known as Miisa, was a Finnish Eurodance artist who released two albums in the 1990s.

Her first single was released in Finland in 1991 and in the mid-1990s Miisa was trying to break into the US markets. Her biggest hit was the single Set Me Free, reaching #9 on the Billboard compiled Dance Club Songs chart in March 1996. The song All or Nothing (1994) was included on the soundtrack to the 1999 comedy But I'm a Cheerleader.

It was later revealed that Miisa did not actually sing on her records, but the real vocalist was the Swedish singer Karin Strömfelt. After her music career, Miisa worked as a make-up artist. She died of cancer on 7 July 2016, aged 46.

== Discography ==
Albums

- Attitude (1994)
- Miisa (1995, US 1996)

Singles

- Upside Down (1991)
- Set Me Free (1993, US 1996)
- Hold On (1993)
- All or Nothing (1994, US 1995)
- You & Me (Innocence) (1994)
- Lovin' U (1995)
- How Will I Know (1996)
- Get Ready (1996)
- If
