= Rose Melberg =

American drummer

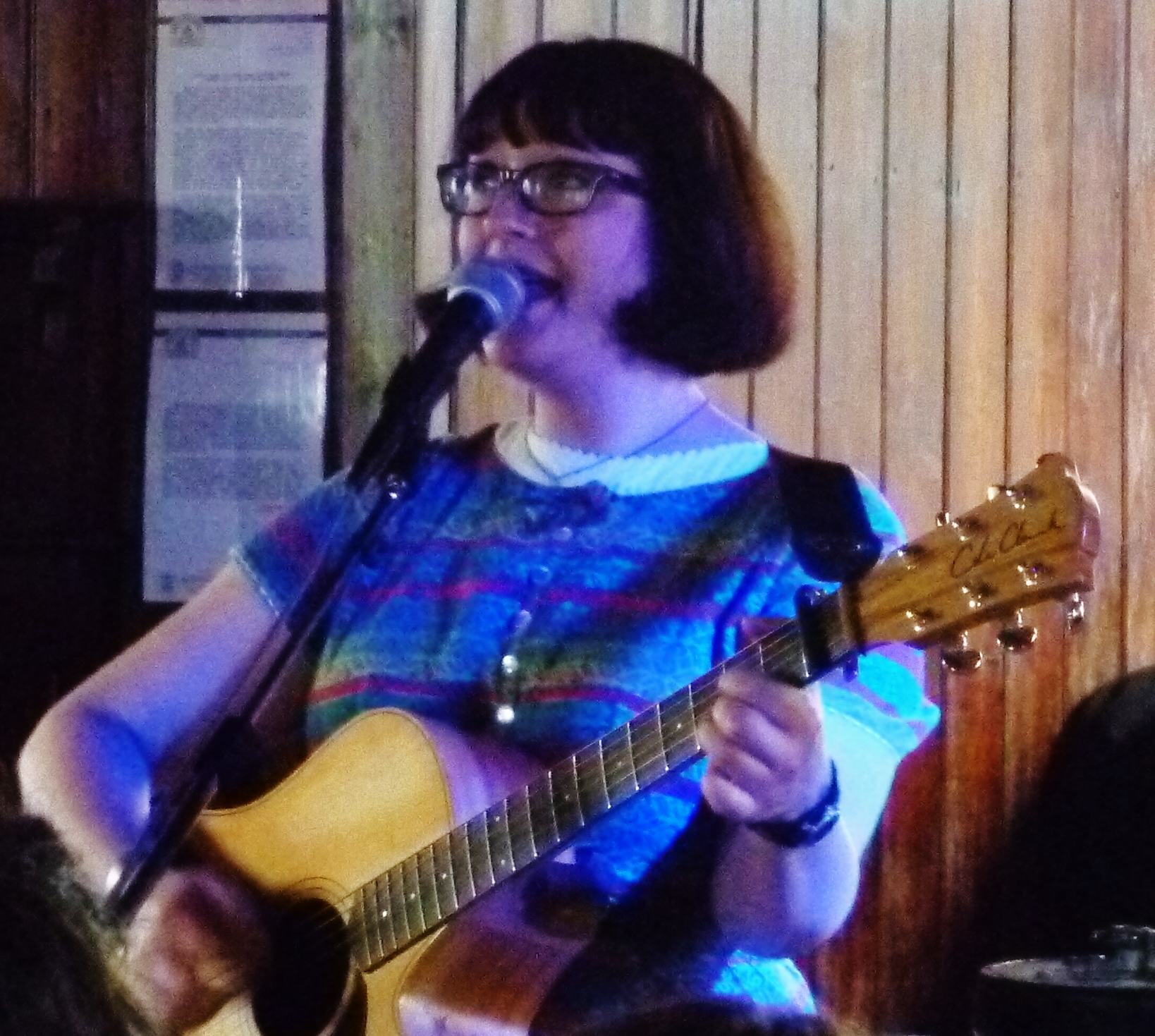
- Rose Melberg in 2012.

Background information
- Genres: Indie pop
- Occupations: Musician, songwriter
- Instruments: Guitar, vocals, drums
- Years active: 1992–present
- Label: Double Agent Records
- Website: doubleagentrecords.com/ myspace.com/rosemelberg

Rose Melberg is a musician and songwriter from Sacramento, California, currently based in Vancouver, British Columbia, Canada. She has performed both as a solo artist and as a member of Tiger Trap, The Softies, Go Sailor, Gaze, Gigi, Imaginary Pants, Brave Irene, Knife Pleats and Olivia's World.

Melberg was raised by working musicians and following her appearance right out of high school at the International Pop Underground Convention in Olympia, Washington, in August 1991, she had almost instant success with the all-female band Tiger Trap. The short-lived band garnered a cult following in indie-pop circles. In 2002, she gave birth to a son and lived with her husband and family in Summerland, British Columbia, Canada. She returned to the pop world in 2006 with her second solo album, Cast Away the Clouds. Melberg toured briefly for the album, including a spot opening for Belle and Sebastian. Her third solo album, Homemade Ship, was released on K Records in 2009. The track "Old Days" was featured as Song Of The Day by NPR Music.

As of 2011, she was a part of two groups, Brave Irene and Imaginary Pants. In 2019, the band Olivia's World, featuring Melberg along with Lica Rezende and Joe Saxby, released its debut EP.

== Discography ==
=== Solo recordings ===
Albums

- Portola (Double Agent, 1998)
- Cast Away The Clouds (Double Agent, 2006; Where It's At Is Where You Are, 2007)
- Homemade Ship (K, 2009)
- September, a covers album on cassette (Lost Sound Tapes, 2013)
- Live in San Francisco - split cassette release with Tony Molina; side A is Rose solo (650 Tapes, 2021)

Singles/compilation appearances

- "My Day," on the compilation International Pop Underground Convention (K Records, 1991)
- "Cupid" (Sam Cooke cover) - 7-inch split single with Magpies, b/w "I Want a Love I Can See" (I Wish I Was a Slumberland Record #3, 1994)
- "The Time Has Come" (Anne Briggs cover) (Double Agent, 2005) - digital single; and bonus track on UK LP release of Cast Away The Clouds (2007)
- Each New Day (Guitar Version) b/w Autumn (Double Agent - digital single, 2008)
- "This Will Be Our Year," originally by The Zombies (Double Agent, 2011) - with Kathy Elzey, Rose's mom
- "Our Days In Kansas," on the compilation Wish I'd Kept A Scrapbook: A Tribute to Tullycraft (Unchikun Records, 2010)
- "Distant Ships" - single-sided 7" (Kingfisher Bluez, 2013)
- "Please," a cover of The Smiths' "Please, Please, Please Let Me Get What I Want", on the compilation Carry On Rioting (Tuff Enuff, 2013)
- "A Life That's Good" (Lennon & Maisy cover) on Live at the Bluebird: A Nashville (THE TV SHOW) Covers Compilation (Nashville Covers/Bandcamp, 2020)

=== Tiger Trap ===
- "Words and Smiles" split 7-inch with Bratmobile (Four Letter Words Records, 1992)
- "Supercrush" b/w "You and Me"/"Hiding" [volume 36 of the "International Pop Underground" singles series] (K Records, 1992)
- Tiger Trap (K Records, 1993)
- Sour Grass EP (K Records, 1993)
- "Baby Blue," from Julep (Another Yoyo Studio Compilation) (Yoyo Recordings, 1993)
- "Hiding," from the International Hip Swing compilation [songs from the "International Pop Underground" series] (K Records, 1993)
- "Supreme Nothing," from the Stars Kill Rock compilation (Kill Rock Stars, 1993)

=== Go Sailor ===
- Fine Day for Sailing 7-inch EP (Yo Yo, 1994)
- Long Distance 7-inch EP (Slumberland, 1995)
- Don't Go 7-inch EP (Lookout!, 1996)
- Go Sailor (Lookout!, 1996): Compiles the three 7-inch EPs plus two compilation tracks

=== The Softies ===
- It's Love (K Records, 1995)
- Loveseat 7-inch EP (Slumberland, 1995)
- The Softies (aka "He'll Never Have to Know") 7-inch EP (K Records, 1995)
- The Softies (Slumberland, 1996)
- "The Best Days" b/w "As Skittish as Me"/"Stranger" (K Records, 1997)
- Winter Pageant (K Records, 1997)
- Holiday in Rhode Island (K Records, 2000)
- The Bed I Made (Father/Daughter Records, 2024)

=== Gaze ===
- Mitsumeru (K Records, 1998)
- So Sad (To Watch Good Love Go Bad) 7-inch EP (Septophilia, 1998)
- Shake the Pounce (K Records, 1999)

=== Brave Irene ===
- Brave Irene (Slumberland Records, 2011)

=== Tally Ho! ===
- I Never Will Marry (WIAIWYA, 2012)

=== PUPS ===
- PUPS (Green Burrito Records, 2013)
- Month Long Sleep 7-inch EP (WIAIWYA, 2013)

=== Imaginary Pants ===
- Imaginary Pants (Lost Sound Tapes, 2012)
- Channels b/w Seacliff 7-inch EP (Rok Lok Records, 2013)
- Kites At Night EP (Lost Sound Tapes, 2014)

=== Knife Pleats ===
- Hat Bark Beach (Lost Sound Tapes/WIAIWYA, 2015)

=== Olivia's World ===
- Olivia's World (Lost Sound Tapes, 2019)

=== As producer ===
- Lisa Prank, Perfect Love Song (Lost Sound Tapes, 2019)

=== Live collaborations ===
- "The Biggest Lie" (with Elliott Smith; 2–13–96, Stinkweeds, Tempe, AZ)

=== Collaborations ===
- Rose Melberg & Dustin Reske – "The Love We Could Have Had" on 4-band Split (1995, Double Agent)
- The Potatomen – "All My Yesterdays" – vocals on 3 tracks (1996, Lookout Records)
- The Smugglers – "Rosie" – from Rosie (2000, Lookout Records)
- Rose Melberg & Gregory Webster – "Merry Christmas (I Don't Want To Fight Tonight)", originally by Ramones (2013, Kingfisher Bluez single-sided 7")
- The Bright Ideas – All Is Calm, All Is Bright! – vocals on "When You Think About Christmas Time" (2000, Popgun Recordings)
- Rose Melberg & Nick Krgovich – "The Mental Beast Christmas Compilation" – "Coldest Night of the Year", originally by Vashti Bunyan (2009)
- Gigi – Maintenant – vocals on "Alone at the Pier" (2010 Tomlab Records)
- Blanket Truth – "Urban Wildlife" – vocals on "Friendly Haunted Mansion", "Bubble Up" (2012, Lost Sound Tapes)
- Jay Arner – "Bad Friend b/w Black Horse" – drums (2012)
