= Tiger Trap (album) =

Studio album by Tiger Trap
- Released: May 25, 1993
- Recorded: 1993
- Genres: Twee pop; indie pop; pop-punk
- Label: K
- Producer: Calvin Johnson

Tiger Trap is the only studio album by the American pop band Tiger Trap, released in 1993 through K Records. It was produced by Calvin Johnson. With about 10,000 copies sold, it was K Records' best-selling album until they released Beck's One Foot in the Grave the following year.

== Music and lyrics ==
Along with twee pop, Tiger Trap is musically aligned with "energetic" indie pop and "romantic" punk-pop. Maria Sherman of NPR observed, "unlike the Sacramento band's riot grrrl contemporaries in the Pacific Northwest, Tiger Trap's sugar-y sweet punk was more in line with U.K. guitar pop bands like Talulah Gosh ("You're Sleeping"), critical of DIY punk's preference for phalluses and articulating that defiance with post-adolescent crush songs."

== Reception and legacy ==
Professional ratings
Review scores
Source	Rating
AllMusic	4.5/5 stars
Robert Christgau	(neither)

The Chicago Tribune opined that "terrific three-part harmonies and a brace of killer melodies make Tiger Trap one of the year's more consistently pleasurable albums." Gail O'Hara for Spin commented on the band's "top-drawer melodies" and called their music "spiffy pop that'll outlast this year's rhetoric". Both her review and others, including one in Billboard, pitched their sweet romantic pop as if in opposition against more angry riot grrrl and rock made by women like Bikini Kill and L7.

Retrospectively, Tiger Trap has been held up as one of twee pop's most essential releases. In a 2005 essay called "Twee as Fuck", Pitchfork's Nitsuh Abebe "highly recommended" the album and highlighted two of its tracks, "Puzzle Pieces" and "My Broken Heart". In 2014, The A.V. Club's Paula Mejia dubbed it a "Possible gateway" into the genre. The following year, the site's Jason Heller wrote that the album "embodies twee," but added that "it’s also a forceful, potent, consummately melodic complement to the more strident sounds of riot grrrl that were raging around them at the time."

On a 2013 Complex list, Trap placed No. 40 out of indie rock's 50 best albums of the 1990s. Writer Philip Cosores saw its impact carry into numerous later groups like Allo Darlin', Veronica Falls, Colleen Green and Swearin'. Writing for The Stranger in 2016, Sean Nelson credited it with "set[ting] the aesthetic standard for NW indie pop forever after." In the 2014 book Gimme Indie Rock, Andrew Earles called the album "quintessential", and wrote that Tiger Trap "packed each song with at least one pop hook."

=== Accolades ===
Critical rankings for Tiger Trap
Publication	Type	List	Year	Rank	Ref.
Complex	Decade-end	The Best Indie Rock Albums of the '90s	2013	40	
Pitchfork	Decade-end	The 25 Best Indie Pop Albums of the '90s	2022	--	
"--" indicates an unordered list.

== Track listing ==
1. "Puzzle Pieces"
2. "You're Sleeping"
3. "Eight Wheels"
4. "Supercrush"
5. "Tore a Hole"
6. "Words and Smiles"
7. "For Sure"
8. "You and Me"
9. "Supreme Nothing"
10. "Chester"
11. "My Broken Heart"
12. "Prettiest Boy"
