= Little-T and One Track Mike =

American hip hop group

- Origin: New Brunswick, New Jersey, United States
- Genres: Hip-hop; alternative rock
- Years active: 1999–2003
- Labels: Artist Amplification; Atlantic; Deko; Family Tree; Lava; MIC
- Past members: Timothy "Little-T" Sullivan; Michael "One Track Mike" Flannery; Justin "J-Ride" Riddle; Jesse "Savior" Saul; Daniel "Shank Bone Mystic" Saks

Little-T and One Track Mike (sometimes stylized as Little T & One Track Mike) was an American hip-hop and alternative rock band from New Brunswick, New Jersey. Founded in 1999 while its members attended Rutgers University, the band included vocalist and lyricist Timothy "Little-T" Sullivan, producer and sound designer Michael "One Track Mike" Flannery, drummer Justin "J-Ride" Riddle, bass guitarist Jesse "Savior" Saul, and guitarist, and keyboardist and backing vocalist Daniel "Shank Bone Mystic" Saks.

== History ==
Timothy Sullivan was given the nickname "Little T" as a child by his older brother. While attending Rutgers University in New Brunswick, New Jersey in 1998, Sullivan introduced himself to dorm mate Michael Flannery, "the lanky kid on the next floor with the computer and four-track", looking for someone to help him launch a career in hip hop. Prior to the release of their debut album, the group performed at the last four stops of the Vans Warped Tour in August 2001. The band's first single "Shaniqua" found moderate success on MTV.

Subsequently, frontman Tim Sullivan performed in a "bad ass rock-and-roll" group named Homeschool and an "acoustic twangcore" project named Mudfite with guitarist Keith Thedinga before going solo and signing with ANTI- Records under the stage name Tim Fite.

== Discography ==
=== Albums ===
- Fome Is Dape (2001)

=== Singles and promo ===
- Fome Is Dape Sampler 1 (2001)
- Fome Is Dape Sampler 2 (2001)
- "Shaniqua" (2001)
- "Wings" (2001)
