= Portola (album) =

Studio album by Rose Melberg
- Released: August 25, 1998
- Genre: Indie pop
- Label: Double Agent Records

Rose Melberg chronology
Portola (1998)	Cast Away the Clouds (2002)

Professional ratings
Review scores
Source	Rating
Allmusic	link

Portola is a 1998 album by singer songwriter Rose Melberg. The album was released by Double Agent Records in August 1998.

== Track listing ==
1. "Deep Purple" (Peter DeRose) - 2:40
2. "Golden Gate Bridge" - 2:33
3. "Happy Birthday to Me" - 1:42
4. "Devoted to You" (Boudleaux Bryant) - 2:11
5. "Loose Talk" (Carl Smith) - 2:54
6. "Another Cup of Coffee" - 2:53
7. "Stitch" - 2:57
8. "I Will" (Lennon/McCartney) - 1:49
9. "My Heaven, My Sky" - 1:29
10. "Mr. Spaceman (Jim McGuinn)" - 3:30
11. "The Love We Could Have Had" - 2:08
