= Gone Ain't Gone =

Studio album by Tim Fite
- Released: September 13, 2005
- Genre: Rock, folk, hip-hop
- Length: 48:20
- Label: ANTI-

Tim Fite chronology
Gone Ain't Gone (2005)	2 Minute Blues (2006)

Professional ratings
Review scores
Source	Rating
AllMusic	3.5/5 stars
Pitchfork	3.6/10

Gone Ain't Gone is Tim Fite's second album, his first for the ANTI- label. Many of the sounds on this record are sampled from CDs "rescued" from the dollar bins in used record stores. A music video for "Away from the Snakes" was released in September 2006.

== Track listing ==
1. "I Hope Yer There" (3:26)
2. "Toasted Rye" (1:04)
3. "No Good Here" (3:34)
4. "Eating at the Grocery Store with William" (1:49)
5. "Forty-Five Remedies" (3:33)
6. "I've Kept Singing (feat. Paul Robeson)" (1:25)
7. "Not a Hit Song" (3:51)
8. "Took a Wife" (2:23)
9. "Shook" (3:42)
10. "If I Had a Cop Show" (0:46)
11. "Flowers-Bloom" (1:43)
12. "A Little Bit" (3:11)
13. "Disgrace" (0:39)
14. "Mascara Lies" (2:37)
15. "Time Comes Around" (0:55)
16. "Away from the Snakes" (3:52)
17. "The More You Do" (10:02)
18. "On the Line" (Japanese bonus track) (3:15)

== Personnel ==
- Tim Fite – vocals, guitar
- Danielle Stech Homsy – baritone ukulele (on Track 4)
- Justin Riddle – drums (on Track 17)
- Bonfire Madigan Shive – cello (on Track 17)
- Ben Kweller – 12-string guitar (on Track 17)
