= Gaze (band) =

- Origin: Vancouver, British Columbia
- Genre: Indie pop
- Years active: 1997–1999
- Label: K
- Past members: Miko Hoffman; Megan Mallet; Rose Melberg

Gaze were an indie pop trio based in Vancouver, British Columbia. They released two albums on K Records during the late 1990s.

== History ==
Gaze, consisting of singers/guitarists Miko Hoffman and Megan Mallet with drummer Rose Melberg, released two singles in 1997.

The band released their first album, Mitsumeru, in 1998. The recording was completed at Dub Narcotic studios. Reviewers praised the singing and instrumentation of the album, but criticized the lack of variety among the various tracks. In 2016, Pitchfork placed the album at number 50 on its list of "The 50 Best Indie Rock Albums of the Pacific Northwest".

The band's second album, Shake the Pounce, was released in 1999. Once again it was praised for its forthright lyrics and emotional singing, but reviewers noted a sameness in the overall style of the album.

== Members ==
- Miko Hoffman – guitar, vocals
- Megan Mallett – guitar, bass
- Rose Melberg – drums

== Discography ==
Albums

- Mitsumeru (K Records, 1998)
- Shake the Pounce (K Records, 1999)

Singles

- "So Sad (To Watch Good Love Go Bad)" (7" single, Septophilia Records, 1997)
- "Gaze" (7" single, K Records, 1997)
