= Tim Fite =

American singer-songwriter

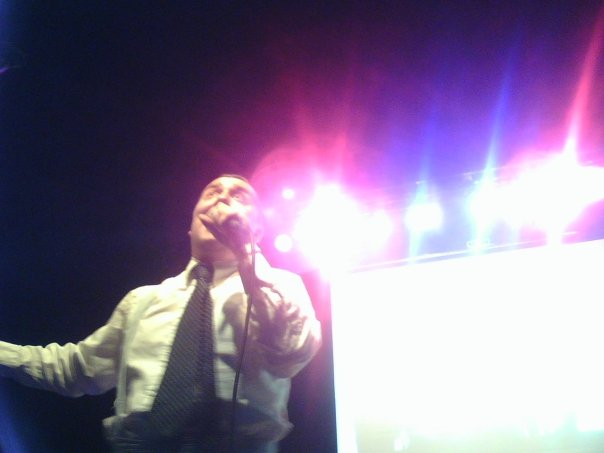
- Tim Fite performing at the Canopy Club in Urbana, Illinois on October 16, 2008

Background information
- Born: Timothy Sullivan
- Origin: Knowlton, New Jersey, United States
- Genres: Folk, hip-hop, indie
- Occupations: Musician, songwriter
- Instruments: Vocals, sampling, guitar, bass
- Years active: 2000–present
- Label: Anti-

Timothy Sullivan, also known as Tim Fite, is an American musician, singer-songwriter, and multi-instrumentalist, living and working in Brooklyn. His past releases have incorporated elements of numerous genres, including indie, alternative, country and hip-hop.

== Life and career ==
Fite was born and raised in rural New Jersey, where he developed a certain fascination with guns and social value systems that can be found in his music, art and the illustrated stories he also creates.

Fite is known for using samples from long-forgotten records to amplify his mixed-genre approach to music. On his Anti- Records debut Gone Ain't Gone he set a self-imposed limit of using only samples from records bought for less than a dollar.

During the early 2000s, Fite was one half of hip hop duo Little-T and One Track Mike, who are mostly remembered for their only hit "Shaniqua", which was popular on music channels such as MTV. After that group went on an indefinite hiatus, Fite signed with ANTI- Records and started releasing solo albums.

In 2006, Fite released a full-length, web-only, free hip hop record, Over the Counter Culture, which was a critique of modern culture of consumerism and greed. Critics from the Los Angeles Times to the Chicago Tribune to the Chicago Sun Times placed it in their top 10 for 2007, yet in deference to the subject matter, Fite decided not to release it commercially. Fite has continued to release albums free of charge through his website, most recently 2010's Under the Table Tennis.

Fite's Fair Ain't Fair was released May 6, 2008, which was followed by a tour with Philadelphia's Man Man.

Tim released Ain't Ain't Aint, the final installment of his "Ain't" album trilogy, on March 6, 2012.

In 2014, Tim parted ways with ANTI records and took a more direct approach to distributing his work, by launching a Kickstarter campaign to fund his next album called IBEENHACKED. His ambitious goal was to create not only an album but a "unified body of artwork surrounding the theme of an album" that would become a "multi-media exploration of how digital living, digital dependence, and digital thinking effect our everyday lives in terms of productivity, creativity, privacy, and self-realization." The album had limited release to his kickstarter backers in August 2014, and a full release is scheduled for September 2014.

He often collaborates with Ryan Foregger for his music videos.

In 2019, he toured Germany, Austria and Switzerland as Bonaparte's opening act.

== Discography ==
=== Albums ===
- Gone Ain't Gone (2005)
- 2 Minute Blues (2006)
- Over the Counter Culture (2007)
- Fair Ain't Fair (2008)
- Change of Heart (2009)
- Under the Table Tennis (2010)
- Ain't Ain't Ain't (2012)
- iBeenHACKED (2014)
- Roar Shack (2020)

=== EPs ===
- It's Only Ketchup (2007)
- Ding-Dong DITCH!!! (2008)
- Watch Your Mouth (2009)

=== Collaborations ===
- See Little-T and One Track Mike for his previous band efforts
- The Water Island with Danielle Stech-Homsy (2006)
- "Black and Costaud (Tim Fite Redux)" with My Brightest Diamond, released on Inside a Boy (2008)
- Just for You with Dr. Leisure (2008)
- "Not Today" with the Grates, released on Teeth Lost, Hearts Won (2008)
- "Porke Yorach" with DeLeon (2008)
- Produced The Low Hanging Fruit by The Wailing Wall (2010)
- "What to Do" with Diwon (2013)
- "Me So Selfie" with Bonaparte, released on Bonaparte (2014)

=== Compilations ===
- Kemuzik One (Kemuzik, 2010) "Where Is MY Woman"
- Four-beat Rhythm: The Writings of Wilhelm Reich (Workshop, 2013)

== Filmography ==
=== Music videos ===
- "Away from the Snakes" (2005)
- "Camouflage" (2007)
- Fair Ain't Fair teasers
  - "Yesterday's Garden" (2008)
  - "Piece of Cake" (2008)
  - "Rats and Rags" (2008)
  - "Thought I Was a Gun" (2008)
- "Big Mistake" (2008)
- "Hold Me All Night" (2013)

=== Short films ===
- "The Day I First Seen Tim Fite" (2006)
- GunShow episodes:
  - "Teaser" (April 30, 2007)
  - "Living with Tim Fite" (Part 1) (May 22, 2007)
  - "Where's Your Beard" (May 29, 2007)
  - "Wrong Side" (June 5, 2007)
  - "Penny Candy Taste Test" (June 12, 2007)
  - "Living with Tim Fite" (Part 2) (June 19, 2007)
  - "Good Cop Bad Cop" (June 27, 2007)
  - "Shame On You" (July 3, 2007)
  - "Wrecking Ball" (July 10, 2007)
