= Jamie Babbit =

American filmmaker (born 1970)

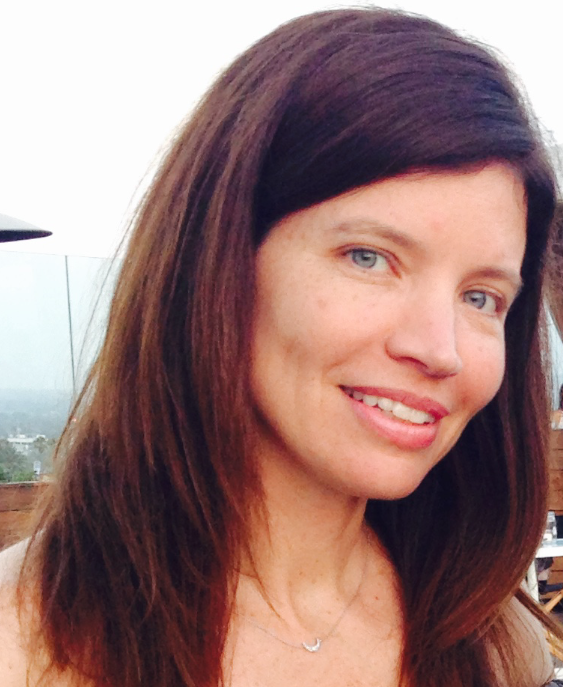
- Babbit in 2016
- Born: Jamie Merill Babbit; November 16, 1970 (age 55); Shaker Heights, Ohio, U.S.
- Education: Barnard College (BA)
- Occupations: Director, producer, screenwriter
- Years active: 1986–present
- Spouse: Andrea Sperling (divorced) Karey Dornetto (m. 2014)
- Children: 2

Jamie Merill Babbit (born November 16, 1970) is an American director, producer and screenwriter. She directed the films But I'm a Cheerleader (1999), The Quiet (2005), and Itty Bitty Titty Committee (2007). She has also directed episodes of such television series as Russian Doll, Gilmore Girls, Malcolm in the Middle, United States of Tara, Looking, Nip/Tuck, The L Word, Silicon Valley, The Marvelous Mrs. Maisel, The Orville, Only Murders in the Building, and A League of Their Own.

== Early life and education ==
Babbit was born in Shaker Heights, Ohio. She grew up in Cleveland with her father, a lawyer and law school professor, and her mother who ran a treatment program for teenagers with drug and alcohol problems, before her death in 2006. The program was called New Directions, and it provided inspiration for the fictional "reparative therapy" (conversion therapy) camp "True Directions" in But I'm a Cheerleader. Babbit began acting at the Cleveland Play House at the age of seven, later moving into stage management and lighting. She studied West African Studies at Barnard College (graduating in 1993) and began taking film classes at New York University during her summer vacations.

== Career ==
After graduating from Barnard College in 1993, Babbit's first job was as an assistant to the assistant for Martin Scorsese on The Age of Innocence. After that she worked as an intern on John Sayles's The Secret of Roan Inish where she worked with fellow aspiring filmmakers Karyn Kusama and Jasmine Kosovic.

Babbit's next job was as script supervisor on John Duigan's film The Journey of August King - a job for which she had little experience, that she said she "lied her way into". This was followed by Su Friedrich's television film Hide and Seek. In 1996, after working on If These Walls Could Talk, where she met her future partner Andrea Sperling, Babbit got a job as script supervisor on David Fincher's film The Game. This proved to be influential to her career as a director.

=== Short films ===
In 1996, Babbit, with Ari Gold, directed Frog Crossing, a comedic short film about an animal rights activist who protects frogs as they hop across a highway. She followed this with 1999 comedy short Sleeping Beauties. While working on The Game, she discussed her idea for a short film based on a fairy tale with Fincher. He gave Babbit about 6,000 feet of 35 mm film. His editor gave her free use of an Avid editing machine. The star of The Game, Michael Douglas, wrote to Paramount and asked them to let Babbit access their costume department. As a result, she was able to make Sleeping Beauties for about $10,000. Based on the classic fairy tale Sleeping Beauty, the film is about a young woman (Sarah Lassez) who works as a makeup artist at a funeral home. Obsessed with an unavailable ex-girlfriend, she eventually meets and falls in love with a photographer's assistant (Clea DuVall). The short premiered at Sundance in 1998. Her other short film Stuck premiered at Sundance in 2002 and won a jury prize.

=== But I'm a Cheerleader ===
In 1999, Babbit directed her first feature film, But I'm a Cheerleader. Starring Natasha Lyonne and Clea DuVall, it is a romantic comedy about a high school cheerleader who is sent to a so-called "reparative therapy" camp when her parents suspect she is a lesbian. The film was inspired by an article that Babbit read about a man who had been sent to a similar camp. The camp in the film was partly based on a halfway house for young people with drug and alcohol problems run by her mother. Babbit wanted this film to have characters that reminded her of herself and the people around her, since there was minimal representation of feminine lesbians in the media. She aimed to make it a comedy because the few lesbian movies produced before hers were serious, somber films. Babbit appeared in This Film Is Not Yet Rated discussing this film and her struggle against an NC-17 rating. In 2000, the film won the Audience Award and the Graine de Cinéphage Award at the Créteil International Women's Film Festival, an annual French festival which showcases the work of female directors. It was also nominated by the Political Film Society for two categories: the Exposé award and the Human Rights award. Film scholar Wheeler Winston Dixon described the film as a commercial and critical success which became a cult film on DVD in later years. In 2020, for the film's 20th anniversary, Babbit's director's cut was released via video on demand. This version of the film was made available on Blu-Ray the next year.

=== The Quiet ===
Babbit's second film was the 2005 thriller film The Quiet. Starring Elisha Cuthbert and Camilla Belle, the plot revolves around a deaf girl who, when sent to live with her godparents, discovers some dark secrets about the family. The film's worldwide rights was acquired by Destination Films, which released this film in the United States theatrically through Sony Pictures Classics. The film was not generally well received by critics, but still became a commercial success. It earned $381,420 in the box office worldwide.

=== Itty Bitty Titty Committee ===
Babbit's next film, comedy Itty Bitty Titty Committee was released in 2007. Produced by POWER UP, it starred Melonie Diaz as a young woman who becomes involved with a radical feminist group. It received mostly negative reviews but was nominated for a Teddy Award at the Berlin International Film Festival and won a jury award at South by Southwest in 2007.

=== Breaking the Girls ===
In 2011, Babbit began production on Breaking the Girls, a thriller film written by Mark Distefano and Guinevere Turner. It was released in 2012.

=== Television ===
Babbit has directed and produced episodes of several television programs including Popular, United States of Tara, The Bernie Mac Show, Malcolm in the Middle, Nip/Tuck, Gilmore Girls, Castle, Alias, Ugly Betty, Dirty Sexy Money, Drop Dead Diva, Looking, Girls, The Marvelous Mrs. Maisel, and The L Word. She enjoys working in television because it helps her to "keep her skills up". She has said that because television directors have less overall responsibility than film directors, she is able to concentrate on working with actors. Television work also enables her to earn money while pursuing her long-term goals of making feature films.

== Personal life ==
Babbit lives in Los Angeles. She has two daughters, Finley and Ryder, with her former partner, producer Andrea Sperling. Babbit is a lesbian.

== Filmography ==
=== Director ===
==== Film ====
- 1994: Discharge (short)
- 1996: Frog Crossing (short)
- 1999: Sleeping Beauties (short)
- 1999: But I'm a Cheerleader
- 2001: Stuck (short)
- 2004: A Memoir to My Former Self (short)
- 2005: The Quiet
- 2007: Itty Bitty Titty Committee
- 2012: Made in Cleveland (segment "Fucking Cleveland")
- 2012: Breaking the Girls
- 2015: Addicted to Fresno
- 2020: The Stand In
- TBA: Red, White & Royal Wedding

==== Television ====
- 1999: Undressed
- 1999–2001: Popular (8 episodes) (Producer – Season Finale)
- 2001: Maybe It's Me (4 episodes)
- 2001: The Bernie Mac Show (2 episodes)
- 2001–2007: Gilmore Girls (18 episodes)
- 2002: Ed (1 episode, "The Road")
- 2002–2003: Malcolm in the Middle (3 episodes)
- 2003: Miss Match (1 episode, "Who's Sari Now?")
- 2003–2004 Nip/Tuck (3 episodes)
- 2004: Wonderfalls (1 episode, "Barrel Bear")
- 2006: Alias (1 episode, "I See Dead People")
- 2006: Ugly Betty (1 episode, "Trust, Lust, and Must"
- 2007–2008: The L Word (3 episodes)
- 2007: The Riches (2 episodes – Season Finale)
- 2007: Gossip Girl (1 episode: "Dare Devil")
- 2007–2008: Dirty Sexy Money (3 episodes)
- 2007: Notes from the Underbelly (2 episodes)
- 2008: Swingtown (2 episodes)
- 2009: Castle (1 episode, "Always Buy Retail")
- 2009: 90210 (2 episodes)
- 2009–2010: Drop Dead Diva (6 episodes)
- 2010: The Middle (3 episodes)
- 2010: United States of Tara (4 episodes)
- 2011: Mr. Sunshine (1 episode, "Cohen and Donovan")
- 2012: Revenge (1 episode, "Duress")
- 2014–2017: Girls (4 episodes)
- 2014: Married (2 episodes)
- 2014–2015: Looking (2 episodes)
- 2015–2017: Brooklyn Nine-Nine (4 episodes)
- 2015–2016: The Grinder (2 episodes)
- 2016: Supergirl (1 episode: "Childish Things")
- 2016–2018: Silicon Valley (8 episodes)
- 2017: It's Always Sunny in Philadelphia (3 episodes)
- 2017: Girlboss (3 episodes)
- 2017: The Orville (1 episode, "Cupid's Dagger")
- 2017: Ghosted (1 episode, "Sam")
- 2018: Santa Clarita Diet (1 episode, "Subspicous Objects")
- 2018: Sorry for Your Loss (1 episode, "I Want A Party")
- 2018: The Marvelous Mrs. Maisel (2 episodes)
- 2019: Russian Doll (3 episodes)
- 2019: First Wives Club (1 episode, "Pilot")
- 2020: Awkwafina Is Nora From Queens (2 episodes)
- 2021–2025: Only Murders in the Building (10 episodes)
- 2022: A League of Their Own (3 episodes)
- 2024: My Lady Jane (5 episodes)
- 2024: Shrinking (1 episode, "Honesty Era")
- 2025: Nobody Wants This (2 episodes)
- 2026: Best Medicine (2 episodes)

== See also ==
- List of female film and television directors
- List of lesbian filmmakers
- List of LGBT-related films directed by women
