= The Ex discography =

The Ex are a Dutch music group from Amsterdam founded in 1979. In their four decades as a band, they have moved from playing anarcho punk to post punk, jazz, folk and African music. They have collaborated on records with fellow indie musicians Chumbawamba, Dog Faced Hermans, Tortoise and Sonic Youth, improvisers like Tom Cora and the Instant Composers Pool, and toured with African musicians Konono Nº1 and Getatchew Mekurya.

The band have released many albums on their own label, Ex Records. Members of The Ex also run small labels through which they release solo material and collaborations with other artists. These include Terrie Hessels' Terp Records, Andy Moor's Unsounds, and Arnold de Boer's Makkum. The Ex distribute all these through their website, along with recordings and publications by founding member and former vocalist G.W. Sok.

== Albums ==
=== Studio albums ===
- Disturbing Domestic Peace (1980)
- History Is What's Happening (1982)
- Dignity of Labour (1983)
- Tumult (1983)
- Blueprints for a Blackout (1984)
- Pokkeherrie (1985)
- Aural Guerrilla (1988)
- Joggers and Smoggers (1989)
- Mudbird Shivers (1995)
- Starters Alternators (1998)
- Dizzy Spells (2001)
- Turn (2004)
- Catch My Shoe (2011)
- 27 passports (2018)
- If Your Mirror Breaks (2025)

=== Live albums ===
- Too Many Cowboys (1987)
- The Ex at Bimhuis (2015)

=== Collaboration albums ===
- Scrabbling at the Lock LP/CD (with Tom Cora, 1991)
- 6 (with guests, 1991)
- And the Weathermen Shrug Their Shoulders LP/CD (with Tom Cora, 1993)
- Instant 2×CD (with guests, 1995)
- In the Fishtank 5 LP/CD (with Tortoise, 1998)
- Een Rondje Holland CD (as Ex Orkest, 2001)
- In the Fishtank 9 LP/CD (with Sonic Youth and Instant Composers Pool, 2002)
- In The Event CD (with Anne-James Chaton, Événements N°19, 2004)
- Moa Anbessa LP/CD (with Getatchew Mekurya and guests, 2006)
- Y'Anbessaw Tezeta 2×CD (with Getatchew Mekurya and Friends, 2012)
- Enormous Door LP/CD (with Brass Unbound, 2013)

=== Compilation albums ===
- Hands Up! You're Free (1988)
- Singles. Period. The Vinyl Years 1980–1990 (2005)
- 30 Years of The Ex (2009)

== Singles and EPs ==
=== As The Ex ===
- All Corpses Smell the Same (1980)
- New Horizons in Retailing (1980)
- Live-Skive (1980)
- Weapons for El Salvador (1981)
- Gonna Rob the Spermbank (1983)
- 1936, The Spanish Revolution (1986, UK Indie No. 6)
- "Rara Rap"/"Contempt" (1988)
- "Stonestampers Song"/"Lied Der Steinklopfer" (1990)
- Dead Fish (1990)
- 6.1 "Slimy Toad"/"Jake's Cake" (1991)
- 6.3 "Hidegen Fujnak A Szelek"/"She Said" (1991)
- 6.6 "Euroconfusion"/"Bird in the Hand" (1992)
- "Maybe I Was the Pilot"/"Our Leaky Homes" (2010)
- "How Thick You Think"/"That's Not A Virus" (2015)

=== In collaboration with other artists ===
- Villa Zuid Moet Blijven (with Svatsox and De Groeten, 1981)
- The Red Dance Package (with Alerta, 1983)
- Enough Is Enough (with Awara, 1984)
- Support the Miners' Strike (with Zowiso and Morzelpronk, 1985)
- Pay No More Than 6 Fr. (with Svatsox, 1985)
- Destroy Fascism! (with Chumbawamba, released under the pseudonym Antidote, 1987)
- Antidote Live in Wroclaw (with Chumbawamba, 1987)
- Keep on Hoppin'/Crap Rap 7" (with The Mekons, 1990)
- 6.2 "Ceme Ryne"/"Millitan" 7" (with Brader, 1991)
- 6.4 Bimhuis 29/06/91 2×7" (with guests, 1991)
- 6.5 "This Song Is in English" 7" (with Kamagurka and Herr Seele, 1991)
- Live at the Bimhuis (with guests, 1992)
- "Late Guma"/"Gue" 7" (with Fendika, 2015)
- "From The Top Of My Lungs" 7″ (split with Selvhenter, 2015)

== Cassette-only releases ==
- Live In Wrocław 29.04.87. (1987)
- Throw Well, Throw Shell! (1987)
- Treat (split live cassette with Dog Faced Hermans, 1990)
- Ample (cassette, 1991)
- Ample 2 (cassette, 1995)
- Ethiopia Tour 2002 (with Han Bennink, 2002)
- Ethiopia Tour 2004 (with Han Bennink, 2004)

== Video ==
- Live At The Bimhuis June 29, 1991 Amsterdam (as The Ex & Guests; VHS/PAL, 1992)
- Beautiful Frenzy (VHS/DVD, 2004)
- Building a Broken Mousetrap (2006)
- Ethio-Punk Songs (with Gétatchèw Mèkurya + Guests; DVD/NTSC, 2007)
- The Convoy Tour: 25 Years Of The Ex (DVD/NTSC, 2009)
- And So Say All of Us (2015)

== Solo and collaborative recordings by individual band members ==
=== Katherina Bornefeld ===
- KatJonBand - KatJonBand, Carrot Top Records, 2008 - with Jon Langford

=== Arnold de Boer ===
- Kowtow to an Idiot (2000, with Zea)
- Today I Forgot to Complain (2003, with Zea)
- Insert Parallel Universe (2006, with Zea)
- The Beginner (2010, as Zea)
- The Swimming City (2014, as Zea)
- The 7inch Cassette (2015, as Zea)
- Moarn Gean Ik Dea (2017, as Zea)

=== Terrie Hessels and Andy Moor together ===
- Lean Left (2010, CD, with Ken Vandermark, Paal Nilssen-Love, live at Bimhuis Vol. 1&2, Smalltown Superjazz)
- Live at Café Oto (2012, CD, with guests, Unsounds)
- Live at Area Sismica (2013, CD, Unsounds)
- I Forgot to Breathe (2017, CD, with Ken Vandermark and Paal Nilssen-Love, Trost Records)

=== Terrie Hessels ===
- Ab* & Terrie* – Hef, Terp Records, 2000
- Han Bennink & Terrie Ex – The Laughing Owl, Terp Records, 2000
- Rozemarie Heggen & Terrie Ex – Fiets (CD, Album), Terp Records IS-05, 2002
- Han Bennink & Terrie Ex – Zeng! (CD, Album) Terp Records, IS-13, 2007
- Han Bennink, Brodie West, Terrie Ex - Let's Go (LP), Terp Records, IS-16-lp, 2010
- Paal Nilssen-Love / Terrie Ex – Hurgu! (CD, Album), PNL, PNL012, 2011
- Xavier Charles / Terrie Ex – Addis (CD, Album)
- Transparancy-Wolk 3, CD (2006, Rikordings #19) – with Rik van Iersel, Han Bennick, P Jacomyn, Bart Maris

=== Andy Moor ===
Andy played in Dog Faced Hermans prior to joining The Ex and appears on all of that group's recordings, as well as his subsequent solo and collaborative work.

==== Albums ====
- Locks (2001, CD, with Kaffe Matthews, Unsounds)
- Thermal (2001, CD, with John Butcher/Thomas Lehn, Unsounds)
- Red V Green (2004, CD, with Yannis Kyriakides, Unsounds)
- Live in France (2007, CD-R, with DJ /rupture)
- Marker (2007, CD, solo, Unsounds)
- Patches (2008, CD, with DJ /rupture, Unsuitable Records)
- Everything But the Beginning (2009, CD, with Colin Mclean, Unsounds)
- Le Journaliste (2009, CD, with Anne James Chaton, Unsounds)
- Rebetika (2010, CD, with Yannis Kyriakides, Unsounds)
- Folia (2010, CD, with Yannis Kyriakides, Unsounds)
- Guitargument (2010, CD, with Mia Clarke, hellosQuare Recordings)
- Décade (2012, CD, Album, Ltd, Book, with Anne-James Chaton and Alva Noto, Raster-Noton)
- Transfer (2012, CD, with Anne James Chaton, Unsounds)
- A Life is A Billion Heartbeats (2014, with Yannis Kyriakides, Unsounds)
- Experiments with A Leaf (2015, with John Butcher, Unsounds)
- Raft – Hope lies Constant in the Mouth (2015, download only, with Steve Heather, Clayton Thomas and Sofia Jernberg, Unsounds)

==== Singles ====
- Transfer 1 Departures (22U) (2011, 7 inch, with Anne James Chaton, Unsounds)
- Transfer 2 Princess in Car (23U) (2011, 7 inch, with Anne James Chaton, Unsounds)
- Transfer 3 Flying Machines (24U) (2012, 7 inch, with Anne James Chaton, Unsounds)
- Transfer 4 Inbound/Outbound (36U) (2013, 7 inch, with Anne James Chaton, Unsounds)

==== Film Soundtracks ====
- Epic (2000, Marion Coutts, short film)
- No Evil Star (2003, Marion Coutts, short film)
- Transit (2004, Banafsheh Khoshnoudi with Yannis Kyriakides, short film)
- Blessed Are the Dreams of Men (2005, Jem Cohen, short film)
- Moving Pictures (2007, Jem Cohen, four 1-minute films)
- Why No Colour? (2007, Jem Cohen with Mia Clarke)
- People of The Shadows (2008, Banafsheh Khoshnoudi with Yannis Kyriakides, documentary)
- Kiba (2012, Banafsheh Khoshnoudi with Yannis Kyriakides)
- Sud Eau Nord Deplacer (2015, Antoine Boutet with Yannis Kyriakides)

=== G.W. Sok ===
==== Albums ====
- 2-2-3 Fridges/Rid, 2010 with Oli Heffernan (i.e. Detective Instinct),
- N.O.W.H.E.R.E with French group Cannibales & Vahinés, 2012
- King Champion Sounds - Different Drummer, 2013, LP
- Action Beat & G.W. Sok - A Remarkable Machine, Double 10", 2014 ERNEST JENNING RECORD CO.
- Two Pin Din & G.W. Sok - Gifts, Milk And Things (2x7"), 2014
- King Champion Sounds - Songs For The Golden Hour (10"/CD), 2014
- Songs for a Free Body (with Cannibales & Vahinés, 2015)

==== Other appearances ====
- "Illusies 1 & 2", 7", as Zoikle (w/ Lukas Simonis), 2011
- Surplus 1980 - "The World's Still Here" (featuring G.W. Sok) on the album Arterial Ends Here, 2013
- Detective Instinct - Black Floral (LP)
- Orchestre Tout Puissant Marcel Duchamp - Rotorotor (CD/LP)
