= 30 Years of The Ex =

Compilation album by The Ex
- Released: March 2009
- Genre: Punk rock, post-punk

The Ex chronology
Moa Anbessa (2006)	30 Years of The Ex (2009)	Catch My Shoe (2011)

30 Years of The Ex is a compilation album by the Dutch band The Ex released in 2009, marking the group 30-year anniversary and the departure of original singer G.W. Sok from the band. The album features songs from all The Ex's albums released between 1980 and 2006, as well as tracks from various singles and EPs. 30 Years of The Ex was released on double LP and double CD with the CDs containing seven extra tracks.

== Track listing ==
LP1

1. "Rules" – from Disturbing Domestic Peace [1980]
2. "Blessed Box at the Backseat" – from History Is What's Happening [1982]
3. "Sucked Out Chucked Out #1" – from Dignity of Labour [1983]
4. "The Wellknown Soldier" – from Tumult [1983]
5. "Jack Frost is Innocent" – from Blueprints for a Blackout [1984]
6. "Fire and Ice" – from Blueprints for a Blackout [1984]
7. "White Liberals" – from Pokkeherrie [1985]
8. "Ay Carmela" – from 1936: The Spanish Revolution [1986]
9. "Knock" – from Too Many Cowboys [1987]
10. "Choice" – from Hands Up! You're Free [1988]
11. "Rara Rap" – from "Rara Rap" 7" [1988]
12. "Headache by Numbers" – from Aural Guerrilla [1988]
13. "Shopping Street" – from Joggers and Smoggers [1989]
14. "State of Freedom" – from Joggers and Smoggers [1989]
15. "Blah Blah" – from Dead Fish [1990]

CD1 extra tracks

1. "Bouquet of Barbed Wire" – from Tumult [1983]
2. "Gonna Rob the Spermbank" – from Gonna Rob The Spermbank 12" [1983]
3. "Lier der Steinklopfer" – from "Stonestampers Song"/"Lied Der Steinklopfer" 7" [1990]

LP2

1. "State of Shock" – from Scrabbling at the Lock [1991]
2. "Hidegen Fjnak a Szelek" – from 6.3 7" [1991]
3. "Stupid Competitions" – from And the Weathermen Shrug Their Shoulders [1993]
4. "Former Reporter" – from Mudbird Shivers [1995]
5. "Travel On, Poor Bob" – from Instant [1995]
6. "Atoll" – from Instant [1995]
7. "Frenzy" – from Starters Alternators [1998]
8. "Time Flies" – from Dizzy Spells [2001]
9. "Symfonie voor Machines" – from Een Rondje Holland [2001]
10. "Huriyet" – from Turn [2004]
11. "Ethiopia Hagere" – from Moa Anbessa [2006]

CD2 extra tracks

1. "The Big Black" – from And the Weathermen Shrug Their Shoulders [1993]
2. "If the Hat Fits the Suit" – from Instant [1995]
3. "The Lawn of the Limp" – from In the Fishtank 5 [1999]
4. "Listen to the Painters" – from Turn [2004]
