= Enormous Door =

Studio album by The Ex & Brass Unbound
- Released: 2013
- Recorded: 4–5 June 2012
- Genres: Punk rock, experimental
- Length: 44:16
- Label: Ex Records
- Producers: Riccardo Parravicini, Mats Gustafsson, Andreas Werliin, Arnold de Boer, Johan Berthling

The Ex & Brass Unbound chronology
Y'Anbessaw Tezeta (2012)	Enormous Door (2013)	27 passports (2018)

Enormous Door is an album by Dutch post-punk band The Ex and Brass Unbound, a quartet of horn players hailing from four countries. The album was released in 2013 on The Ex's own label, comprising reworked versions of previously released songs and alongside entirely new material.

== Background ==
Emerging as an anarchist punk rock quartet in 1979, The Ex began to frequently work with jazz musicians within their first decade. Their 1989 album Joggers and Smoggers, 1995's Instant, and the singles series the band released in 1991 and 1992 featured extensive collaborations with members of the Dutch free jazz ensemble Instant Composers Pool (ICO), and 2001's Een Rondje Holland presented a larger horn section as part of the band's Ex Orkest. As the band developed their repertoire into the 21st century, they turned their attention to Ethiojazz and were backing Addis Ababa saxophonist Getachew Mekurya on world tours and for his 2006 album Moa Anbessa with French, Dutch, and Canadian musicians Xavier Charles, Joost Buis, and Brodie West on clarinet, trombone and alto saxophone. The Ex's 2010 album Catch My Shoe featured trumpet work by Italian Roy Paci, and when The Ex returned to record a final album with Mekurya in 2012, they were joined by Chicago reed player Ken Vandermark, as well as Buis, Charles, West, and ICP trombonist Wolter Wierbos.

Amidst these collaborations with The Ex, a new international collective of horn players gradually formed and by 2010 adopted the name "Brass Unbound" after Johan van der Keuken's 1993 film of the same name. In his film, Van der Keuken follows the development of the European brass band tradition in the former Dutch colonies to include traditional marching bands to more hybridized forms of brass music that combine European instruments with Ghanaian rhythms. Independent of concerts with Getatchew Mekurya, Brass Unbound began touring as a live act with The Ex in 2010. For these concerts, the ensemble wrote and improvised new material, as well as reworkings of songs from The Ex's catalog.

== Songs ==
Released in 2013, Enormous Door catalogues The Ex's material with Brass Unbound. The songs "Bicycle Illusion" from their first album with vocalist Arnold de Boer and "Our Leaky Homes" from a 2011 single rearrange their songs to make space for horn parts. A popular love song by Ethiopian singer Mahmoud Ahmed that had long been in The Ex's live set with Getatchew Mekurya is sung by drummer Katherina Bornefeld. And The Ex's tribute to Congolese street band Konono Nº1, which first appeared on the Ex's 2004 album as "Theme from Konono", resurfaces as "Theme from Konono Nº2" on Enormous Door.

Previously unreleased songs comprise the remainder of the album, leading with the North African-inspired "Last Famous Words", with others exploring themes from punk culture, free jazz, and leftist politics.

== Reception ==
Professional ratings
Review scores
Source	Rating
All About Jazz	4/5 stars
Ox-Fanzine	4.5/5 stars
Pitchfork	8.1/10
Tom Hull	A−

The Quietus placed Enormous Door on its list of the top albums of 2013. Pitchfork's Douglass Wolk called Enormous Door "an acrobatic, ferocious record, a welcome burst of electric noise and squealing horns from a group whose power and flexibility keep growing with time."

== Track listing ==
1. "Last Famous Words" - 5:56
2. "Every Sixth Is Cracked" - 6:30
3. "Belomi Benna" - 4:36
4. "Red Cow" - 3:30
5. "Our Leaky Homes" - 4:23
6. "Bicycle Illusion" - 7:05
7. "We Are Made Of Places" - 5:22
8. "Theme From Konono No.2" - 7:10

== Personnel ==
The Ex

- Andy Moor: guitar, baritone guitar
- Terrie Hessels: guitar, baritone guitar
- Arnold de Boer: vocals, guitar, sampler
- Katherina Bornefeld: drums, vocals

Brass Unbound

- Mats Gustafsson: baritone saxophone
- Ken Vandermark: tenor and baritone saxophones, clarinet
- Wolter Wierbos: trombone
- Roy Paci: trumpet
