= G.W. Sok =

Dutch singer (born 1957)

G.W.Sok
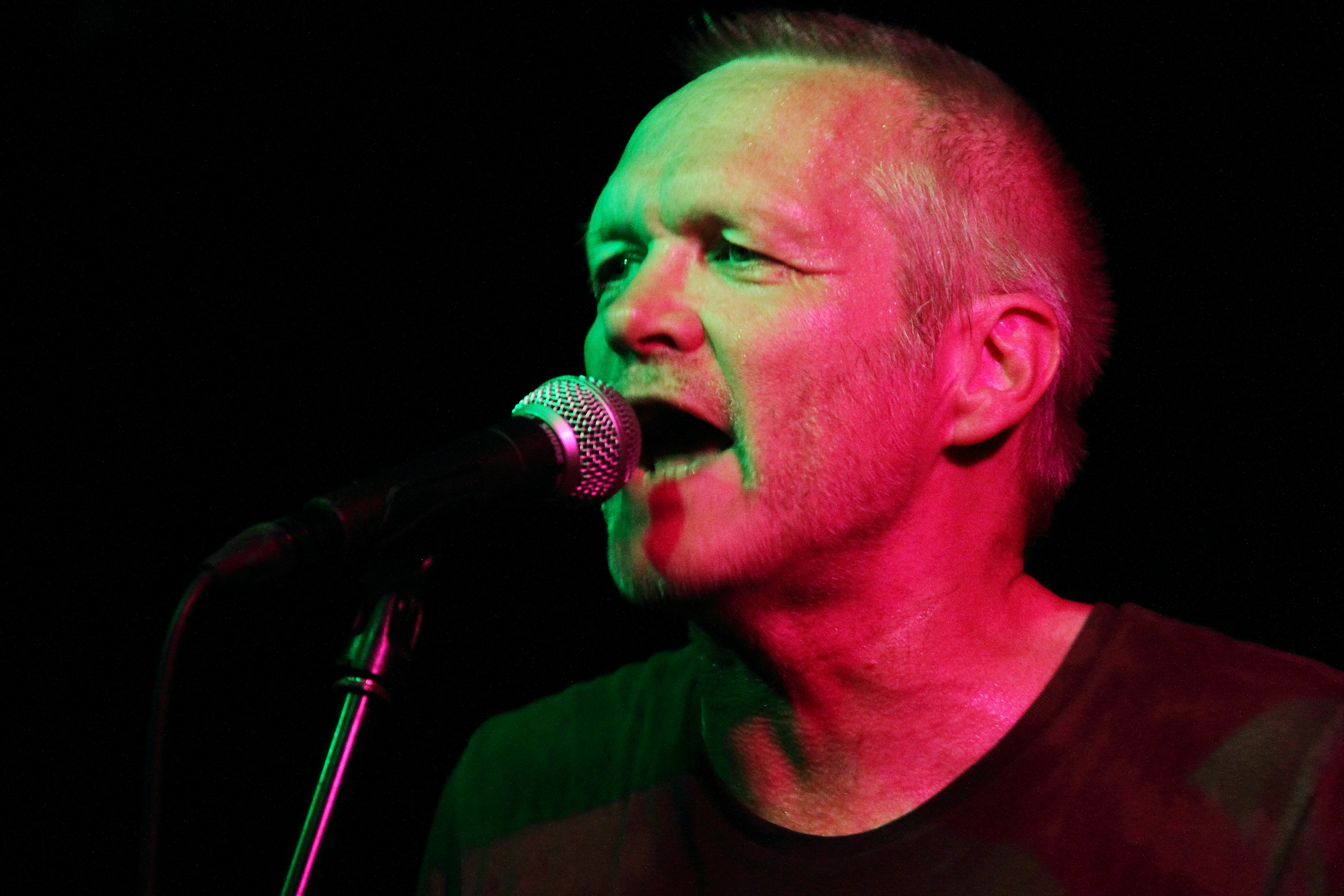
- G.W.Sok in King Champion Sounds in concert on 18 September 2016 in Germany.

Background information
- Born: 1957 (age 68–69)
- Origin: Amsterdam
- Genres: Punk, anarcho-punk, punk jazz, post-punk
- Years active: 1979–present

G.W. Sok (born 1957, real name Jos Kleij) is a Dutch singer, best known for his 30-year career as the frontman of the Ex. G.W. Sok left the Ex in 2008 to focus on a solo career and collaboration projects with other musicians, participation in theatre performances and spoken word performances. Apart from his musical career he is also active as a writer and a graphic designer.

== Biography ==
After leaving the Ex, Sok started to collaborate with several acts among which are the French experimental free jazz band Cannibales & Vahinés and the Italian band Zu. In 2010 the single "2-2-3 Fridges/Rid" appeared on Sickroom Records. He joined the Dutch collective Beukorkest on their 2011 tour.

In 2011 Sok released the book A Mix of Bricks & Valentines, a 400-page collection of the Ex lyrics and other lyrics he wrote. Also in 2011 De Eeuwige Optie (The Everlasting Option) was published, an experimental film by SpOp featuring Sok as an actor. He also wrote the words for the film's ending track "Illusies". This track was also released as the 7-inch "Illusies 1 & 2" under the bandname Zoikle, consisting of Sok, guitarist Lukas Simonis, cellist Nina Hitz, drummer Cor Hoogerdijk and Maarten van Gent on metal percussion.

A new band King Champion Sounds was also formed, from the remnants of The Bent Moustache, the musical act of Krommenie-based, Kenya-born, UK-raised Ajay Saggar. This incarnation sees Saggar teaming up with Sok and, amongst others, Oli Heffernan (Year of Birds, Shrug) and has released four albums since 2013. In 2014 Sok published a double 10" with the UK noise act Action Beat.

Since 2015 Sok is a member of the free-rock group Oiseaux-Tempête and is regularly joining live the collective founded by Frédéric D. Oberland & Stéphane Pigneul. Sok has contributed to the last four albums of the band.

== Bibliography ==
- A Mix of Bricks & Valentines (2011, PM Press)

== Discography ==
=== The Ex ===
- Disturbing Domestic Peace (1980)
- History Is What's Happening (1982)
- Tumult (1983)
- Blueprints for a Blackout (1984)
- Pokkeherrie (1985)
- 1936, The Spanish Revolution (1986)
- Too Many Cowboys (1987)
- Hands Up! You're Free (1988)
- Aural Guerrilla (1988)
- Joggers and Smoggers (1989)
- 6 (1991)
- Scrabbling at the Lock (1991)
- And the Weathermen Shrug Their Shoulders (1993)
- Instant (1995)
- Mudbird Shivers (1995)
- Starters Alternators (1998)
- Dizzy Spells (2001)
- Een Rondje Holland (2001)
- Turn (2004)
- Moa Anbessa (2006)
- 30 Years of The Ex (2009)

=== King Champion Sounds ===
- Different Drummer (2013, LP)
- Songs for the Golden Hour (2014, 10"/CD)
- To Awake in That Heaven of Freedom (2016, LP)
- Fool Throttle/Debby (2017, 7", One Day)
- For a Lark (2018, LP)

=== Oiseaux-Tempête ===
- ÜTOPIYA? (2015, 2xLP)
- Unworks & Rarities (2016, LP)
- AL-'AN! (2017, 2xLP)
- TARAB (2018, 2xLP)
- From Somewhere Invisible (2019, LP)
- What On Earth (Que Diable) (2022, 2xLP)

=== Other collaborations ===
- 2-2-3 Fridges/Rid (2010, with Oli Heffernan i.e. Detective Instinct)
- N.O.W.H.E.R.E (2012, with French group Cannibales & Vahinés)
- Action Beat & G.W. Sok – A Remarkable Machine (2014, Double 10, Ernest Jenning)
- Two Pin Din & G.W. Sok – Gifts, Milk And Things (2014, 2x7")
- Songs for a Free Body (2015, with Cannibales & Vahinés)
- Action Beat & G.W. Sok – The World Is Fucked But I Feel Fine (2017, MC, Econore)
- Zoikle – "Illusies 1 & 2" (2011, 7", with Lukas Simonis)
- Surplus 1980 – "The World's Still Here" (featuring G.W. Sok) track from the album Arterial Ends Here (2013)
- Surplus 1980 Collectiv Ensembl With G.W. Sok - "Forget All This" (2019)
- Detective Instinct – Black Floral (LP)
- Orchestre Tout Puissant Marcel Duchamp – Rotorotor (CD/LP)
- Sopa Boba - That moment (LP/CD)
- Dream skills - As we speak (LP)
