= 27 passports =

Studio album by The Ex
- Released: March 22, 2018
- Recorded: October–November, 2017
- Studios: Electric Monkey Studio and Arnolds Upstairs, Amsterdam
- Genres: Post-punk; art punk
- Length: 56:46
- Labels: Norman Records, Ex Records
- Producer: The Ex

The Ex chronology
Enormous Door (2013)	27 passports (2018)	If Your Mirror Breaks (2025)

Professional ratings
Review scores
Source	Rating
Mondo Sonoro	8/10
OndaRock	7.5/10
Ox-Fanzine	4.5/5 stars
Tom Hull	A
Vice (Expert Witness)	A−

27 passports is a 2018 album by the Dutch band The Ex. It is the group's first studio album in five years since Enormous Door, their 2013 collaboration with Brass Unbound, and The Ex's first album of all new material since 2010's Catch My Shoe.

== Background ==
After The Ex's original vocalist G.W. Sok left the group in 2009, the band adopted Arnold de Boer from the band Zea on vocals and third guitar, writing and recording the 2010 album Catch My Shoe. Over the next several years the group toured and recorded two collaborative LPs with Ethiopian saxophone player Getatchew Mekurya and international horn quartet Brass Unbound, as well as several singles, including one with Addis Ababa collective Fendika. The group began working on an album of new material in April 2017, and by July were playing it as a set in front of live audiences. In October and November, the band spent three days in the studio recording the album's 10 songs, laying down overdubs and mixing in de Boer's home studio.

== Release and packaging ==
27 passports was released via LP, CD and digital download in March 2018. The vinyl release of the album came with a full-size 36-page booklet of photographs by guitarist Andy Moor.

== Reception ==
Robert Christgau, writing for Noisey, called the album an "unrelenting hour of protest music" and considered it an improvement over Catch My Shoe. The Quietus considered it to be "possibly their most accomplished to date; still brimful of ideas and wisdom and still spitting out enough attitude and trickery to last most bands a career [...] they continue to get better and better".

Norman Records and Oor ranked it the 7th and 9th best album of the year respectively. Tom Hull ranked it the best non-jazz album of 2018, while Christgau ended up ranking it at #22 on his "Dean's List 2019" (which includes albums from both 2018 & 2019).

== Track listing ==
1. "Soon All Cities" 6:27
2. "The Heart Conductor" 4:49
3. "This Car is My Guest" 6:35
4. "New Blank Document" 7:17
5. "Silent Waste" 2:36
6. "Piecemeal" 6:56
7. "Birth" 4:24
8. "Footfall" 5:00
9. "The Sitting Chins" 5:27
10. "Four Billion Tulip Bulbs" 7:09

== Personnel ==
- Arnold de Boer (vocals, guitar, claps)
- Katherina Bornefeld (drums, vocals)
- Terrie Hessels (guitar)
- Andy Moor (guitar, baritone guitar, photography)

== Charts ==
Chart (2018)	Peak position
Dutch Albums (Album Top 100)	189
