= Y'Anbessaw Tezeta =

Studio album by Getatchew Mekuria, The Ex and friends
- Released: 2012
- Recorded: 1960, 2004, 2009 and 2011–12, in the Netherlands, Addis Ababa and Montreal
- Genres: Ethiopian music, Jazz, punk rock
- Label: Terp Records
- Producer: The Ex

The Ex chronology
Catch My Shoe (2011)	Y'Anbessaw Tezeta (2012)	Enormous Door (2013)

Getatchew Mekuria chronology
Moa Anbessa (2006)	Y'Anbessaw Tezeta (2012)

Instant Composers Pool chronology
Y'Anbessaw Tezeta (2012)

Y'Anbessaw Tezeta is the second studio album by Ethiopian tenor saxophone player Getatchew Mekuria in collaboration with Dutch punk rock band The Ex and several other musicians. The title is Amharic for "The Memory of the Lion" and Mekurya intended the record to mark the closure of his 65-year career.

== History, recording and release ==
Five years after the release of his album Moa Anbessa, Getatchew Mekuria asked The Ex to make one more album with him. Getatchew had toured the world with the band and a number of guest musicians in the interim, and chose to revisit some of his older material after deepening his artistic collaboration with them. From December 2011 through April 2012 they recorded several pieces of music—mostly instrumentals—in both the Netherlands and Ethiopia. The Ex brought together an international roster of friends to play horns on the sessions, including Chicago saxophonist Ken Vandermark, French clarinetist Xavier Charles, and Dutch trombonists Joost Buis and Wolter Wierbos. The Ex produced the release of the recordings themselves as a benefit for Getatchew.

The album also features an extra disc of music by Getatchew Mekuria playing live with various ensembles. Much of the disc demonstrates the evolution of his collaboration with European punk and jazz musicians: the first three tracks are of Getatchew performing with the Instant Composers Pool (ICP) in the Netherlands at The Ex's 25th anniversary show in 2004; one track is a recording with The Ex lineup that appears on their album Turn live in France, also from 2004; three more tracks are feature both The Ex and members of ICP (the lineup from Moa Anbessa) performing in Montreal from 2009. The extra disc also features a hidden track of rehearsals, plus archival recordings of Getatchew playing with both the Police and Haile Selassie 1 Theatre Orchestras in Addis Ababa, which The Ex found in a box while visiting Addis Ababa and date back to the early 1960s.

The two-CD set came with a 40-page booklet of photos and was released on The Ex's improv and African music imprint, Terp Records.

== Reception ==
Both Time Magazine and The Rap-Up placed Y'Anbessaw Tezeta at number five on their lists of top albums of 2012.

== Track listing and album credits ==
=== Disc One ===
Track list:

1. Ambassel (7:35)
2. Tezeta (4:22)
3. Bertukane / Yematebela Wof / Shegitu (5:53)
4. Bati (3:45)
5. Ene Eskemot Derese (4:04)
6. Yegna Mushera (4:02)
7. Aha Gedawo (5:00)
8. Almaz Men Eda New (4:21)
9. Abbay Abbay / Yene Ayal (4:25)
10. Zerafewa / Eregedawo (4:12)

Personnel:

- Getatchew Mekuria (tenor saxophone)
- Arnold de Boer (trumpet)
- Terrie Hessels (guitar)
- Andy Moor (guitar)
- Katherina Bornefeld (drums)
- Xavier Charles (clarinet)
- Ken Vandermark (baritone saxophone, bass clarinet)
- Brodie West (alto saxophone)
- Joost Buis (trombone)
- Wolter Wierbos [trombone]
- Colin McLean (bass)
- Melaku Belay (dance)

Recorded December 6/7 2011, February 24/28 2012, April 5/23 2012 at Jottum, Wormerveer, the Netherlands and May 3, 2012, at Fendika, Addis Ababa, Ethiopia. Engineered and mixed by Maarten Tap, Andy Moor and Arnold de Boer. Mastered by Frank van der Weij, produced by The Ex. Artwork by Emma Fischer, photos by Matias Corral, Emma Fischer, Andy Moor, Pavel Stráẑay, Nanni Angeli, Barbora Fabianova, Christina Halstrom, Nick Helderman, Leul Mekonnen and Paul Till, with archival photos from Getatchew Mekuria's private photo-albums.

=== Disc Two ===
Track list:

1. "Yene Hasab Gwadegna"
2. "Aha Gedawo"
3. "Shellelle"
4. "Yegenet Musica"
5. "Ambassel"
6. "Lale Guma"
7. "Yaf Zemed Mech Teffa"
8. "Bati"
9. "Shellelle Fukera"
10. "Ambassel"

Recording info:

- Tracks 1–3 feature Getatchew Mekuria playing with Instant Composers Pool recorded live at the Paradiso, Amsterdam, November 19, 2004, as part of The Ex's 25th Anniversary Concert.
- Track 4 features Getatchew Mekuria playing with The Ex, recorded live in Mulhouse, France, November 12, 2004.
- Tracks 5–7 feature Getatchew Mekuria playing with The Ex + Guests recorded live at La Sala Rosa in Montreal, Quebec on September 14 and 16, 2009.
- Track 8 performed solo, recorded in 2011.
- Tracks 9 recorded with the Police Orchestra in Addis Ababa during the early 1960s.
- Track 10 recorded with the Haile Selassie 1 Theatre Orchestra in Addis Ababa during the early 1960s. The song is followed by more than five minutes of snippets of Mekuria rehearsing with The Ex and other musicians.
