= King Champion Sounds =

Experimental post-punk free jazz band

King Champion Sound
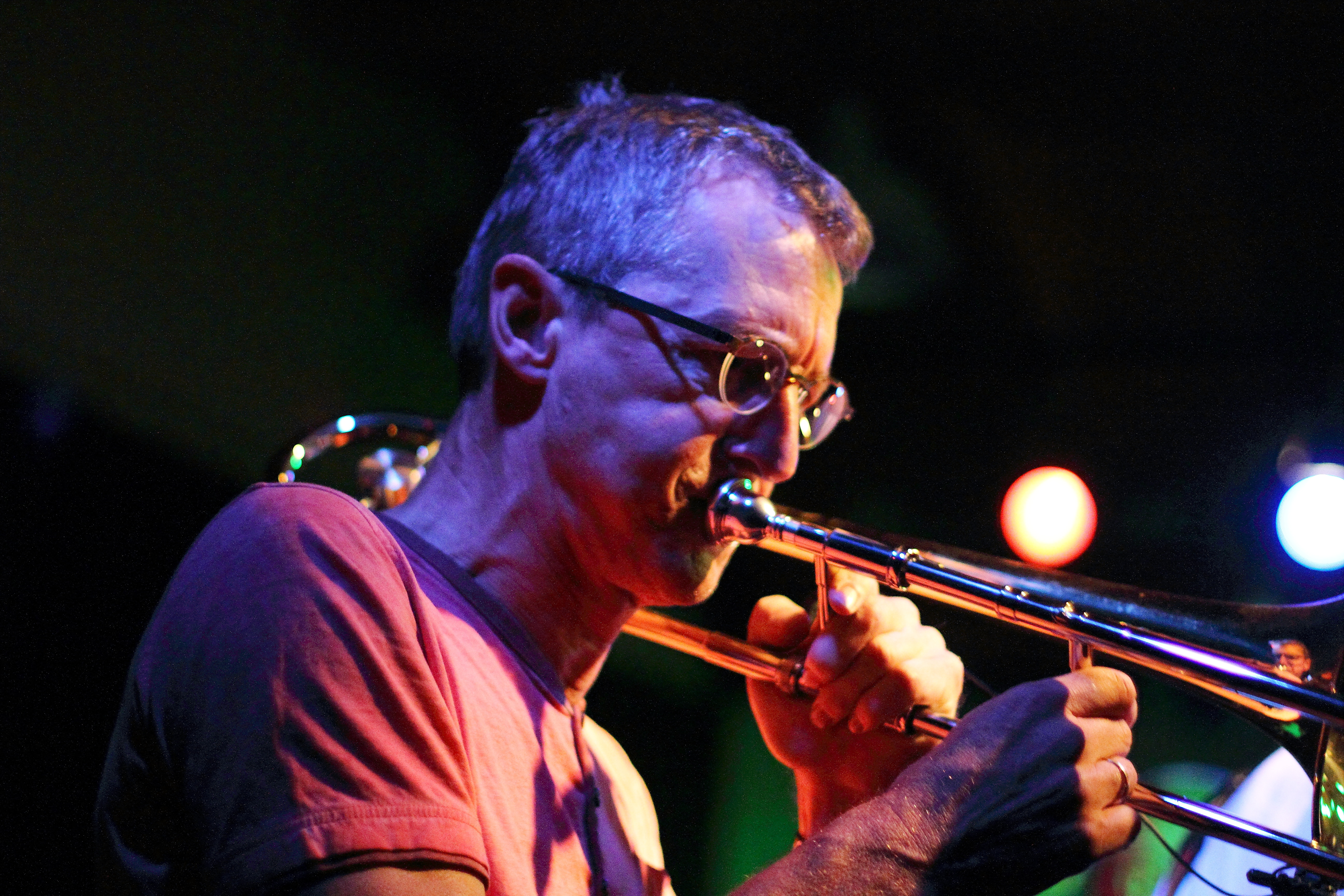

Background information
- Genres: Post-punk, free jazz
- Members: G.W. Sok; Ajay Saggar; Oli Heffernan; Dani Johnson; Mees Siderius; Ditmer Weertman; Chris Moerland; Holly Habstritt Gaal
- Website: https://kingchampionsounds.wordpress.com

King Champion Sounds is an experimental post-punk free jazz band. The band has been compared to Sun Ra The Fall, and Ennio Morricone. The band consists of members of The Ex (G.W. Sok), Ivan The Tolerable and Detective Instinct (Oli Heffernan), and The Bent Moustache (Ajay Saggar).

== History ==
Ajay Saggar's band The Bent Moustache was asked to open for Mike Watt and Saggar agreed with the proviso that he could create a special 30-40 minute piece especially for the show. After writing the music, Saggar contacted G.W. Sok to write the lyrics and perform the vocals. Next, Saggar invited Oli Heffernan on guitar and Mees Siderius on drums. Ditmer Weertman and Chris Moerland were then invited to contribute horns. The show was successful enough that Saggar decided to give the project a name and continue. King Champion Sounds played their first gig at the Paradiso in Amsterdam on 17 July 2013.

Musically, songs are initially written by Saggar who then forwards them to Sok to author lyrics. From there the songs continue to be built in stages. Their first album was entitled Different Drummer

Their third album, To Awake In That Heaven Of Freedom, featured guest appearances by J Mascis (Dinosaur Jr) and Mike Watt (Minutemen).

== Discography ==
- Different Drummer (2013)
- Songs for the Golden Hour (2014)
- To Awake in That Heaven of Freedom (2016)
- For a Lark (2018)
