= In the Fishtank 9 =

EP by Sonic Youth, Instant Composers Pool and The Ex
- Released: Netherlands, July 2001
- Genres: Experimental rock; free improvisation; post-rock
- Length: 29:34
- Label: In the Fishtank (Konkurrent)
- Producer: Zlaya Hadzic

Sonic Youth chronology
SYR5 (2000)	In the Fishtank 9 (2001)	Murray Street (2002)

The Ex chronology
Een Rondje Holland (2001)	In the Fishtank 9 (2001)	Turn (2004)

In the Fishtank chronology
In the Fishtank 8 (2002)	In the Fishtank 9 (2001)	In the Fishtank 10 (2003)

Professional ratings
Review scores
Source	Rating
AllMusic	4.5/5 stars
Blender	2/5 stars

In the Fishtank 9 is an album of songs by alternative rock bands Sonic Youth, the Instant Composers Pool Orchestra, and the Ex. It was released in 2001 on the Konkurrent label.

== Reception ==
Thom Jurek of AllMusic praised the collaboration as "a wonder", praising the fact that "everyone participates in creating something fresh and new, without anybody getting in anybody else's way. The spirit of cooperation and the excitement of discovery here are both prescient. The result is neither rock nor jazz, but a free-form music that dispenses with formality and ego and goes for the heart of the thing itself." He concludes: "For nearly a half-hour, the listener gets to eavesdrop on the purest kind of music-making by those dedicated to nothing else than the pursuit of its creation."

== Track listing ==
1. "III" – 3:27
2. "IV" – 4:28
3. "V" – 2:45
4. "VI" – 3:03
5. "VII" – 4:14
6. "VIII" – 2:16
7. "IX" – 3:24
8. "X" – 5:49

== Personnel ==
Per the album liner notes:

Sonic Youth

- Lee Ranaldo – guitar
- Thurston Moore – guitar
- Steve Shelley – drums
- Jim O'Rourke – electronics
- William Winant – percussion

I.C.P.

- Ab Baars – reeds
- Han Bennink – drums
- Wolter Wierbos – trombone

The Ex

- Luc Ex – bass guitar
- Terrie Ex – guitar
