= Brodie West =

Canadian jazz musician

- Born: Saskatoon, Sask., CANADA
- Genres: Avant-garde jazz, free jazz, experimental
- Occupation: Musician
- Instruments: Alto saxophone, clarinet,

Brodie West is a Canadian alto saxophonist who has worked with The Ex, Getatchew Mekuria, Sandro Perri, Lina Allemano, Hamid Drake and Gord Downie.

== Biography ==
Born in 1975 and raised in Nanaimo, British Columbia, West began playing saxophone in the sixth grade. In his teens, West began performing as well as attending educational programs which led to him being awarded a soprano saxophone at the Lionel Hampton Jazz Festival in Idaho, and receiving the Rising Star Award at Musicfest Canada, which included a full scholarship to Humber College in Toronto in 1993.

== Career ==
In 1998, West formed a trio called Zebradonk with drummer Shawn Abedin and trumpeter Alfons Fear. Deciding to do a busking tour of Europe, the trio met Han Bennink at Bimhuis in Amsterdam.

West began studying with Misha Mengelberg in Amsterdam and while there he reconnected with Han Bennink who introduced West to Terrie Hessels of the Dutch experimental band The Ex. West then began touring with The Ex playing over 100 dates between 2005 and 2015. He appeared with The Ex and Getatchew Mekurya on the albums Moa Anbessa, Y'Anbessaw Tezeta, and The Ex at Bimhuis.

West has since formed The Brodie West Quintet which has released the album Clips and Eucalyptus which released the album Kick It Till You Flip It in 2019.
