= Yannis Kyriakides =

Cypriot–Dutch composer

Yannis Kyriakides (Greek: Γιάννης Κυριακίδης, born 1 August 1969) is a Cypriot composer of contemporary classical music, and sound art. His music explores new forms and hybrids of media, synthesizing disparate sound sources and highlighting the sensorial space of music. He has focused in the majority of his work on ways of combining traditional performance practices with digital media, particularly in the use of live electronics. The relation between music and language has been explored in many pieces that utilize text films as a multimedia element.

== Biography ==
Yannis Kyriakides was born in Limassol, Cyprus and emigrated to the United Kingdom when he was five years of age. He studied music at the University of York, and later moved to the Netherlands to study composition at the Royal Conservatory of The Hague with composers Louis Andriessen and Dick Raaijmakers. He is co-founder of the record label UNSOUNDS, and teaches composition at the Royal Conservatory of The Hague. He has been associated with ensembles such as the Asko Ensemble, musikFabrik, Ensemble MAE, Icebreaker, Seattle Chamber Players, and Ensemble Integrales and musicians such as Andy Moor from the Ex and trumpeter Marco Blaauw. He also regularly collaborates with visual artists and filmmakers HC Gilje, Joost Rekveld and Stefanos Tsivopoulos, as well as choreographers Leine & Roebana, Guy & Roni, and theatre maker Paul Koek. In 2007 he was featured composer at the Huddersfield Contemporary Music Festival and in 2011 at November Music in The Netherlands. His opera An Ocean of Rain opened the Aldeburgh Festival in 2008, and two of his sound installations were shown in the Dutch Pavilion at the Venice Biennale 2011.

== Prizes ==
- The Johan Wagenaar Prize in December 2020
- The International Music Council's International Rostrum of Composers prize in 2014 for "Words and Song Without Words"
- Willem Pijper Prize in 2011 for "Dreams of the Blind"
- Netherlands Toonzetters prize for best composition in 2011 for "Paramyth"
- Best experimental CD at the Qwartz Electronic Music Awards for "Antichamber" in 2011
- Honorable mention for the CD 'Wordless' at the Prix Ars Electronica in 2006
- Gaudeamus International Composers Award in 2000 for a conSPIracy cantata

== Selected works ==
- Oneiricon (2014) interactive score
- Music for Viola (2014) viola solo
- Lunch Music (2013) voices, percussion, electronics [80']
- Words and Song Without Words (2012) cello, electronics, video
- Wavespace (2011) Octet with live electronics [25′]
- Paramyth (2010) violin, clarinet, piano, computer [15']
- Memoryscape (2010) ensemble, soundtrack, text video [32'] for musikFabrik
- Disco Debris (2010) interactive sound installation
- Satellites (2009) ensemble and soundtrack [50'] for Seattle Chamber Players
- An Ocean of Rain (2008) opera [85'] with Theatre Cryptic for the Aldeburgh Festival
- The Queen Is the Supreme Power in the Realm (2007) ensemble, live electronics, video [45'] with hc Gilje for musikFabrik/Koln Triennale
- Dreams of the Blind (2005) ensemble, soundtrack, text video [33'] for Ensemble MAE
- Escamotage (2005) music theatre [60'] for FNM Staatsoper Stuttgart
- Wordless (2005) sound installation [50'] for Argos Festival
- Slow Wave Sleep (2004) string quartet, trombone quartet and electronics [45'] for Doelen Quartet and New Trombone Collective/ Gaudeamus Festival
- The Buffer Zone (2004) music theatre [60'] for Festival aan de Werf
- Subliminal: The Lucretian Picnic (2003) ensemble, soundtrack, video [35'] for ASKO ensemble / Festival in de Branding
- Lab Fly Dreams (2003) ensemble, electronics, video [20'] with hc Gilje, Icebreaker Ensemble / Orkest de Volharding/ BBC commission
- Spinoza (2002) music theatre [80'] with Paul Koek, ZT Hollandia
- Scape (2001) ensemble, soundtrack, video [75'] with Isabelle Vigier, Joost Rekveld for Orkest de Volharding
- Strobo (2001) 6 amplified glass panes, stroboscopes, electronics [30']
- a conSPIracy cantata (2000) 2 voices, piano, electronics [45']
- Four Maggots for viola and double bass (1992)

== Selected discography ==
- "a conSPIracy cantata" (CD, UNSOUNDS, 01U, 2001)
- "The Thing Like Us", on Spinoza (CD, UNSOUNDS, 09U, 2003)
- "The Buffer Zone", audio theatre (CD, UNSOUNDS, 11U, 2005)
- "Wordless", 12 sound portraits (CD, UNSOUNDS, 13U, 2006)
- "Antichamber", Double CD of electroacoustic chamber music (UNSOUNDS, 21U, 2010)
- Resorts and Ruins (CD, UNSOUNDS, 33U, 2013)
- Rebetika (with Andy Moor, 2010, CD, Unsounds)
- "Folia" collaboration with guitarist Andy Moor (CD, UNSOUNDS, 19U, 2010)
- A life is a Billion Heartbeats (with Andy Moor, 2014, CD, Unsounds)

== Sources ==
- Jason van Eyk, Musicworks, Issue 106 spring 2010 -
- Andy Beckett, The Spying Game - Guardian Interview - Friday May 31, 2002
- Rob Young, The Wire, Jan 2006 - Unsound Thinker
- Peter Bruyn, Gonzo, de stem de taal en het muzikale verhaal
- Frits van der Waa, 'Elektronica toont innerlijke wereld', de Volkskrant, 9 October 2008
- Stefano Isidoro Bianchi, Interview in Italian Music Magazine, BLOW UP #143, April 2010
