= Singles. Period. The Vinyl Years 1980–1990 =

Compilation album by The Ex
- Released: September 13, 2005
- Recorded: 1980–1990
- Genre: Punk rock
- Length: 70:16
- Label: Touch and Go Records

The Ex chronology
Turn (2004)	Singles. Period. The Vinyl Years 1980–1990 (2005)	Moa Anbessa (2006)

Professional ratings
Review scores
Source	Rating
Pitchfork	7.8

Singles. Period. The Vinyl Years 1980–1990 is a compilation album by Dutch punk rock band The Ex, containing most of their singles released between 1980 and 1990. The collection does not include the band's double-single 1936, The Spanish Revolution, nor their "6" series or their collaborations with artists such as Chumbawamba and Dog Faced Hermans).

Singles. Period. was released in 2005 by Touch and Go Records during a time when The Ex's material was only being issued physically on compact disc. The band later returned to releasing albums on vinyl, and even began to issue new 7" singles in 2010.

== Track listing ==
1. "Human car" - 2:14
2. "Rock'n'roll-stoel" - 2:07
3. "Cells" - 1:52
4. "Apathy disease" - 3:29
5. "Stupid Americans" - 2:16
6. "Money" - 1:36
7. "Curtains" - 2:17
8. "Weapons for El Salvador" 2:48
9. "Dust" - 2:15
10. "New wars 2" - 1:38
11. "Constitutional state" - 1:55
12. "Gonna rob the spermbank" - 3:46
13. "When nothing else is helpful anymore" - 3:32
14. "Memberships" - 5:34
15. "Trash" - 4:56
16. "Crap-rap" - 2:51
17. "Long live the aged" - 3:54
18. "Enough is enough" - 4:42
19. "Rara rap" - 4:33
20. "Contempt" - 2:25
21. "Stonestampers song" - 2:58
22. "Lied der Steinklopfer" - 3:35
23. "Keep on hoppin'" - 3:04
