= Moa Anbessa =

Studio album by Getatchew Mekuria, The Ex and guests
- Released: 2006
- Recorded: April 3–4, 2006 at Jottem, Wormerveer, Netherlands; tracks 3, 5, 6, 8, 11 recorded live April 8, 2006, in the Grand Mix, Tourcoing, France, by Jeroen Visser
- Genre: Ethio-Jazz; art punk
- Length: 61:50
- Label: Terp Records
- Producer: Jeroen "Ato Asa" Visser and Dolf Planteijdt

The Ex chronology
Singles. Period. The Vinyl Years 1980–1990 (2005)	Moa Anbessa (2006)	30 Years of The Ex (2009)

Getatchew Mekuria chronology
Moa Anbessa (2006)	Y'Anbessaw Tezeta (2012)

Moa Anbessa is an album by Ethiopian saxophonist Getatchew Mekuria with Dutch post-punk band The Ex and guests, released in 2006 on The Ex's subsidiary label Terp.

== Background ==
The project came together on the heels of The Ex's previous studio album Turn, which incorporated elements of Eritrean and Congolese music alongside a tribute to the Ethio-Jazz anthems of Getatchew Mekuria. The Ex had toured Ethiopia twice and then invited Getatchew to perform at their 25th anniversary show in Amsterdam where he proposed that The Ex be the backup band for his next album. In addition to Moa Anbessa, the collaboration yielded tours of Europe and North America as well as an official live DVD released by Buda Musique, producers of the influential Ethiopiques series of ethiojazz compilations.

== Live performances ==
In addition to Mekuria and The Ex's core two-guitar/drums/vocals line up, Moa Anbessa and the tours surrounding it featured additional brass and reed work from Canadian alto sax player Brodie West, French clarinetist Xavier Charles, and Dutch trombonist Joost Buis who had previously played with the band in their Ex Orkest project. The Ex also reunited with Scottish bass player Colin McLean with whom they had toured and co-released records in the late 1980s when both McLean and Andy Moor were members of the Dog Faced Hermans.

== Album title ==
The name "Moa Anbessa", Amharic for "The Conquering Lion", refers to a political party made up of Ethiopians who support a constitutional monarchy. The party was created by exiled titular emperor Amha Selassie I to operate as the political wing of the crown. As an album title, it makes note both of Getatchew's support of the royal family, as well as his own "return to the throne" of Ethiopian jazz.

== Reception ==
Professional ratings
Review scores
Source	Rating
All About Jazz	4.5/5 stars
Ox-Fanzine	9/10

Steve Holtje of The Big Takeover ranked Moa Anbessa the best album of the year, writing: "the idea of a bunch of left-wing punks [...] acting as Mekurya’s band had seemed an odd fit, and fraught with potential for disappointment and disaster. But then here came their new album together [...] and it is a magnificent melding of cultures. [...] Moa Anbessa is a great introduction to Mekurya for rock fans. The Ex doesn’t cut their intensity a bit – heck, they need it all to keep up with Mekurya, still going strong in his seventies. This is a powerful, rocking record that will thrill even listeners who’ve never bought a “world music” album in their lives." Jason Cherkis of Washington City Paper called the album "thrilling." Peter Margasak hailed the album as "Ethio-Dutch brilliance".

== Track listing ==
1. "Ethiopia Hagere" – 6:31
2. "Sethed Seketelat" – 4:31
3. "Eywat Setenafegagn" – 5:05
4. "Che Belew Shellela" – 4:50
5. "Aynamaye Nesh" – 5:55
6. "Aynotche Terabu/Shemonmwanaye" – 8:15
7. "Musicawi Silt" – 4:23
8. "Tezeta" – 4:17
9. "Almaz Yeharerwa" – 5:35
10. "Tezalegn Yetentu" – 6:03
11. "Aha Begena" – 6:30

== Personnel ==
- Getatchew Mekuria (tenor saxophone)
- G.W. Sok (vocals)
- Katherina Bornefeld (drums)
- Terrie Hessels (guitar)
- Andy Moor (guitar)
- Colin McLean (bass)
- Xavier Charles (clarinet)
- Joost Buis (trombone)
- Brodie West (alto saxophone)
- Cor Fuhler (organ on tracks 6, 9 and 10)
