= Leonid Soybelman =

- Born: 20 July 1966 (age 58)
- Origin: Bălți, Moldavian SSR, USSR
- Genres: Experimental music, alternative rock, free jazz, electronic music,
- Occupation(s): Musician, composer
- Instrument(s): Guitar, vocals
- Years active: 1986 – present
- Labels: NoMansLand, Tzadik

Leonid Soybelman (born 20 July 1966 in Balti, USSR (now Moldova)) Leonoid is a Berlin-based musician and film composer, leader of the band Ne Zhdali. The guitarist and singer, he also collaborated with Alec Kopyt in the "Poza" project, with bands Auktyon, The Billy Tipton Memorial Saxophone Quartet and many others. His musical style has roots from eastern European traditional Yiddish folk music, yet is played in more modern arrangements on the electric guitar, often accompanied by a band. His work, especially with Ne Zhdali, is well known in Russia and countries of the former Soviet Union.

Originally from Moldavia, he grew up in Tallinn, USSR (now Estonia), where he founded in the late 1980s the band Ne Zhdali together with his classmate Ilya Komarov. Later Soybelman moved to Berlin, Germany and Komarov to Zürich, Switzerland. In the 1990s they reunited with Ne Zhdali in Western Europe, continuing touring and producing new albums.

As frontman of "Kletka Red" he performed together with Tony Buck, Andy Ex and Joe Williamson. Their album Hijacking was produced by John Zorn at his label Tzadik Records in the "Radical Jewish Culture" series.

Soybelman composed the music for the Czech film Something like happiness (Czech: Štěstí) 2005, portraying the melancholy lives of four friends who grew up together in the same block of flats in a former industrial town in northern Bohemia. The somewhat bleak backdrop of the film fits snugly with Soybelman's sombre and heartfelt music.
