= Mudbird Shivers =

Studio album by The Ex
- Released: June 1995
- Recorded: February–March 1995 at the Koeienverhuurbedrijf, Purmerland, Holland
- Genre: Post-punk; art punk; anarcho-punk; experimental rock
- Length: 49:23
- Label: CrossTalk (US); Ex Records/RecRec Music (Netherlands)
- Producer: Dolf Planteijdt & Colin McLean

The Ex chronology
And the Weathermen Shrug Their Shoulders (1993)	Mudbird Shivers (1995)	Instant (1995)

Professional ratings
Review scores
Source	Rating
AllMusic	4/5 stars
Tom Hull	B+

Mudbird Shivers is an album by Dutch punk/experimental band The Ex. Released in 1995, the album prominently features vocals by guest musician Han Buhrs, who also plays a number of different instruments on the recording. It was released the same year as The Ex's entirely instrumental improv album Instant.

== Reception ==
Dean McFarlane of Allmusic called the album "a fantastic introduction to their varied material, which is high-energy post-punk in a similar vein to Fugazi, Crass, and Shellac." "To describe their approach," he writes, "the Ex is a quintet of guitars percussion and vocals – stylistic references would be Captain Beefheart for all the angular abrasive guitar work and syncopated rhythm, early P.I.L. in that they share the influence of African and Jamaican musics – but the most striking reference is European traditional and folk, given a post-punk electric shock on this engaging album. Highly political in their lyrical content, the range here covers angular bass and drum rhythms while guitars skate about colliding in squalls of noise like Sonic Youth that surpass the hardest post-punk rockers such as Jesus Lizard or June of 44 in energy. At other moments, folk songs [are] given simple guitar and vocal arrangements that provide relief from the barrage of propulsive noise workouts. These folk songs, such as "The Carpenter," [sic] recall British folk revivalists Kevin Coyne and Burt Jansch [sic] in some ways, and they may sound unusual when considering that the rest of the album is made up of avant-rock chaos and political diatribe that is far from subdued." Trouser Press reviewed the album positively, calling Buhrs "practically a vocal twin for Captain Beefheart [...] he's got the range for it, and provides a useful counterpart to Sok's one-note bellow (they duet on a few tracks)." Despite writing that the track "Embarrassment" "has a great lyric and a great riff that don't really belong together [...] the album is [otherwise] superb, abrasive, daring and full of unexpected kicks, including a slow, bulbous cover of the traditional "House Carpenter.""

Andrea Moed of CMJ New Music Monthly also compared Buhrs to Captain Beefheart and praised the band's "rhythmically intense arrangements."

In 2015, 20 years after the album's release, Alex Siquig wrote an article on it for Popmatters. According to him, despite the fact that the album isn't a "litmus test" "classic" (unlike Blonde on Blonde or OK Computer) or that "it’s probably not even one of the albums true-blue fan-boys of the Ex would tout as an ideal starting point for new fans, or as a record of any particular significance", he wrote that "Mudbird Shivers is too special to dismiss or forget. Have the Ex made better and more complete albums? Without a doubt! Turn (2004) is their late career classic, an ambitious double LP most bands wouldn’t even attempt. Starters and Alternators [sic] (1998) is likewise the Ex at their most mature and refined, smartly kicking the shit out of the State. Their collaborations with outlaw cello maven Tom Cora and the Ethiopian saxophone savant Getachew Merkuria [sic] are also required listening, along with the 2000's [sic] 1936: Spanish Revolution [sic], Dizzy Spells, Blueprints for a Blackout, and 2011's Joggers and Smoggers. But the fully-formed dissident spirit of the Ex waits patiently in the past, in Murdbird Shivers."

== Track listing ==
1. "Thunderstruck Blues" – 6:22
2. "Only If You Want 3" – 5:00
3. "Ret Roper" – 4:27
4. "Embarrassment" – 4:10
5. "House Carpenter" – 4:07
6. "Newsense" – 2:50
7. "Former Reporter" – 3:58
8. "Shore Thing" – 5:51
9. "Things Most People Think" – 2:41
10. "Audible Bacillus" – 4:52
11. "Hunt Hat" – 5:13

== Personnel ==
- Terrie (guitar)
- G.W. Sok (vocals)
- Luc (bass)
- Andy (guitar, viola)
- Katrin (drums)
- Han Buhrs (vocals, saxophone, mouth-harp, panlids, grater)

== Notes ==
- Cogan, Brian. Encyclopedia of Punk Music and Culture. Westport, Conn.: Greenwood Press, 2006. p. 70. ISBN 978-0-313-33340-8.
- Mount, Heather. "Three Looks into The Ex". In Crane, Larry. Tape Op: The Book about Creative Music Recording, Volume 2. Milwaukee: Hal Leonard Corporation, 2010. pp. 230–233.
- Robbins, Ira A., ed. The Trouser Press Guide to '90s Rock: The all-new 5th edition of The Trouser Press Record Guide. New York: Simon & Schuster, 1997. ISBN 0684814374.
- Sok, G.W. A Mix of Bricks & Valentines: Lyrics 1979–2009. New York: PM Press, 2011.
- Temporary Services. Group Work. New York: Printed Matter, March 2007.
