= Dignity of Labour =

Studio album by The Ex
- Released: March 1983
- Recorded: 1982 at Koeienverhuur Studio and the abandoned Van Gelder Paper Factory
- Genres: Post-punk; art punk; noise rock; industrial music
- Producer: Dolf Planteijdt

The Ex chronology
| History Is What's Happening (1982) | Dignity of Labour (1983) | Tumult (1983) |

Professional ratings
Review scores
| Source | Rating |
|---|---|
| AllMusic | 3/5 stars |

Dignity of Labour is the third album by Dutch anarchist punk rock band The Ex, originally released in 1983. The album was originally issued as a box set of four 7-inch records in solidarity with factory workers where there the band were residing. The tracks were compiled onto a CD album a decade later.

== Background ==
After taking up residence in an abandoned villa in the Dutch city of Wormer, The Ex conceived the album to pay tribute to the nearby Van Gelder paper factory. The factory had been a site of workers' resistance to Nazi occupation during World War II, but decades later shut down due to unsafe working conditions, outdated machinery, and corporate exploitation.

Joined by new drummer Sabien, The Ex recorded the album's eight songs with producer Dolf Planteijdt in his Koeienverhuur "Cow Rental" Studio, adding in material recorded in the abandoned paper factory itself. The music incorporates machine-like industrial music rhythms that includes engines, printing presses, and pile drivers alongside guitar, double-bass, drums, saxophone, and marimba. The lyrics document the life and death of the factory, building from its establishment as a paper mill in the nineteenth century, its threat of being dismantled and relocated to Germany during the Second World War, its bounceback during a post-war economic boom, followed by a takeover by an American multinational corporation that eventually closed it down in 1980.

== Release ==
The Ex released Dignity of Labour as a box set of four 7" singles, simply titling each song "Sucked Out and Chucked Out" pressed into records that bore blank black labels. The album's cover photo shows workers from the factory in 1980, reacting to the news that they had just been fired. Originally slated for launch in December 1982, it was delayed due to a failure in the British Customs Service, eventually a seeing release in March on 1983.Inside its book were the four records, a 24-page booklet, and poster depicting a jammed paper machine from the factory with the lyrics printed on the back.

Dignity of Labour was first issued on CD, along with The Ex's entire back catalog, in 1993, and later as a digitally via Bandcamp.

== Track listing ==
1. "(Sucked Out Chucked Out) 1"
2. "(Sucked Out Chucked Out) 2"
3. "(Sucked Out Chucked Out) 3"
4. "(Sucked Out Chucked Out) 4"
5. "(Sucked Out Chucked Out) 5"
6. "(Sucked Out Chucked Out) 6"
7. "(Sucked Out Chucked Out) 7"
8. "(Sucked Out Chucked Out) 8"
