= Instant (album) =

Studio album by The Ex + Guests
- Released: October 1995
- Studios: Koeienverhuurbedrijf, Purmerland, Holland
- Genres: Free improvisation; experimental rock; free jazz; avant-garde
- Length: 69:10
- Labels: CrossTalk (US); Ex Records/RecRec Music (Netherlands)
- Producer: Dolf Planteijdt

The Ex + Guests chronology
Mudbird Shivers (1995)	Instant (1995)	Starters Alternators (1998)

Professional ratings
Review scores
Source	Rating
Allmusic	3/5 stars
Tom Hull	A−

Instant is a double compact disc released in 1995 by the Dutch experimental post-punk band The Ex. The band recorded the album in conjunction with many guest musicians, notably members of Holland's Instant Composers Pool (ICP) for whom the album is partially named, the other part being that the Dutch term for "free improvisation" literally translates to "instant composition."

== Background ==
The Ex had long collaborated with ICP members and featured those recordings on the double album Joggers and Smoggers and on the box set 6. Instant marked the band's first album of entirely instrumental and improvised music. Instant's 32 tracks feature shifting duos and trios of musicians performing on a wide array of conventional (electric guitars, reeds, brass, etc.) and non-conventional (e.g., toffee-tin bass) instruments. Though the entire album could have fit onto one 70-minute CD, the band formatted it for a briefer listening experience with each of Instant's 35-minute discs containing 16 short tracks.

== Reception ==
Dean McFarlane's review for Allmusic is quite positive (in contrast to the middling score), calling it a culmination of the "stridently avant-garde direction" the band had taken "beginning with the Joggers and Smoggers album and explored extensively with cellist Tom Cora -- from the punchy chaotic punk rock of the band's '80s releases to total free improvisation." He writes that the "collection covers a lot of ground, from noisy vignettes in the vein of Fred Frith and Chris Cutler's workouts to subdued passages that recall even atonal avant-garde classical works; AMM and Derek Bailey also spring to mind. Instant is not all free-form, however -- in fact, the forms are held together by vague folk themes and the band's classic angular Captain Beefheart-like arrangements." He concludes by writing that the "two-CD set is certainly substantial in covering the band's multifaceted work, and with a group this unique and with so many compelling approaches that mix folk, punk, free jazz, and ethnic forms in such a singular fashion, there are few other recordings of this nature around." Trouser Press was similarly positive, calling it "[n]icely annotated, bravely executed and totally cool."

== Track listing ==
Disc 1

1. "If the Hat Fits the Suit" - 3:22
2. "Duo Rumpus" - 1:25
3. "Kloptimog Twist" - 1:11
4. "Baars vs. Karekiet" - 2:10
5. "Keng Lil Surf" - 3:07
6. "Duo Triptych Too" - 2:43
7. "Lip Up, Stump" - 2:03
8. "So Low, Solex?" - 1:25
9. "Skoplje Bop" - 3:11
10. "Buildance" - 2:26
11. "Bratunac" - 1:32
12. "Horsemeal" - 0:42
13. "Expoobident" - 1:10
14. "Slow Sleeper - 4:00
15. "Duo Loom" - 2:49
16. "Te-Au-O-Tonga" - 1:40

Disc 2

1. "Travel On, Poor Bob" - 2:17
2. "What Inflexibility?" - 2:00
3. "Bon-Go Tell You Git-La La" - 1:26
4. "Duo Variola" - 1:13
5. "Meanwhile Back in Ozone Street" - 1:30
6. "Smuiger" - 2:50
7. "Rusticles" - 2:49
8. "Atoll" - 1:44
9. "Exile O'phonics" - 2:57
10. "Danse Maudit" - 1:47
11. "Knit Knack + Zoom" - 1:59
12. "Oh Muted Foghorn" - 2:15
13. "Duo Tonebone + Hitgit" - 2:38
14. "The Turtle the Hare" - 2:39
15. "Karremans' Last Measure" - 2:38
16. "ThereWereSonicBangsInTheSongsISang,ThereWasNothingTicklingNoOne" - 1:54

== Personnel ==
=== The Ex ===
- Terrie (guitar)
- Luc (bass
- Andy (guitar, viola)
- Katrin (drums)
- Han Buhrs (harmonica, guitar, toffee-tin bass)
- G.W. Sok (various)

Various band members also play organ, accordion, samples + tape, djembé-springs, mbira, reed shakers, musical saw, acoustic guitar, double-bass, chairs.

=== Guest musicians ===
- Ab Baars (saxophones, clarinet)
- Wolter Wierbos (trombone)
- Han Bennink (drums)
- Michael Vatcher (drums, percussion)
- Tristan Honsinger (cello),
- Dolf Planteijdt (acoustic guitar)

== Notes ==
- Cogan, Brian. Encyclopedia of Punk Music and Culture. Westport, Conn.: Greenwood Press, 2006. p. 70. ISBN 978-0-313-33340-8.
- Mount, Heather. "Three Looks into The Ex". In Crane, Larry. Tape Op: The Book about Creative Music Recording, Volume 2. Milwaukee: Hal Leonard Corporation, 2010. pp. 230–233.
- Robbins, Ira A., ed. The Trouser Press Guide to '90s Rock: The all-new 5th edition of The Trouser Press Record Guide. New York: Simon & Schuster, 1997. ISBN 0684814374.
- Sok, G.W. A Mix of Bricks & Valentines: Lyrics 1979–2009. New York: PM Press, 2011.
- Temporary Services. Group Work. New York: Printed Matter, March 2007.
