= Disturbing Domestic Peace =

Studio album by The Ex
- Released: 1980
- Recorded: LP on October 10–12, 1980 at Joke's Koeienverhuurbedrijf; Live 7" on August 30, 1980 at the Drieluyck, Zaandam
- Genres: Anarcho-punk, noise rock, post-punk
- Length: 30:05 (includes 7")
- Labels: LP on Verrecords Live 7" on Eh Records Reissued on CD by Ex Records

The Ex chronology
Disturbing Domestic Peace (1980)	History Is What's Happening (1982)

Professional ratings
Review scores
Source	Rating
AllMusic	2/5 stars
Tom Hull	B+

Disturbing Domestic Peace is the debut album from Dutch anarchist band The Ex.

== Background ==
The Ex had formed and recorded their earliest material in 1979 during the heyday of the Dutch squatters movement. Following the band's release of their All Corpses Smell the Same EP, the group's bassist René left the band for New Zealand and was replaced by then 15-year-old Bas. The Ex reentered Dolf Planteijdt's Koeienverhuurbedrijf (literally "cow rental") Studio to record 10 songs for an LP that covered topics such as the Dutch housing crisis and squatters' movement ("Squatsong"), police brutality ("Warning-Shot"), environmental illness ("A Sense of Tumor"), and sexual assault ("Meanwhile").

== Release ==
Because Disturbing Domestic Peace's studio material clocked in at under 30 minutes, the band decided to press it at 45 RPM and add a bonus 7" of four live songs to make the package into a full-length release. The album's cover depicts Dutch police in the process of evicting squatters, reflecting the heightened tensions and confrontations in Netherlands and other parts of Europe at that time. The band priced the record at 10 Dutch guilders and sold out all 1,000 copies of its original October 1980 pressing within a week, prompting them to order further pressings that sold another 3,000 copies for that year's Christmas season. A final batch of 500 copies followed in early 1981.

In addition to the bonus "Live Skive" 7", the original 12" album included a booklet of lyrics, starting the band's habit of including many inserts in their next 12 years' worth of releases. The album was first issued on CD, along with The Ex's entire back catalog, in 1993, and then as a digital download on Bandcamp in the 2010s. The American label Superior Viaduct announced that it would be reissuing the album in its original 12"-with-bonus-7" format, including a 20-page booklet, in September 2020.

== Track listing ==
All tracks by The Ex

=== Studio LP ===
1. "The Sky Is Blue Again" - 2:01
2. "Map" - 1:14
3. "Outlook-Army" - 0:39
4. "Sucking Pig" - 1:58
5. "A Sense of Tumour" - 4:00
6. "Meanwhile" - 3:54
7. "Rules" - 1:41
8. "Squatsong" - 1:51
9. "Warning-Shot" - 2:55
10. "New Wars" - 2:46

=== Live-Skive bonus live 7" ===
1. "Introduction" - 2:20
2. "Human Car" - 1:48
3. "Punk" - 1:47
4. "Horse" - 1:11

== Personnel ==
- G.W. Sok – vocals
- Terrie - guitar
- Bas - bass
- Ome Geurt - drums

Remark: The studio's name, "Joke's Koeienverhuurbedrijf" translates from Dutch as "Jenny's Cow Rentals, Ltd." ("Joke" is quite a common first name for women in the Netherlands).

== Notes ==
- Cogan, Brian. Encyclopedia of Punk Music and Culture. Westport, Conn.: Greenwood Press, 2006. p. 70. ISBN 978-0-313-33340-8.
- Mount, Heather. "Three Looks into The Ex". In Crane, Larry. Tape Op: The Book about Creative Music Recording, Volume 2. Milwaukee: Hal Leonard Corporation, 2010. pp. 230–233.
- Robbins, Ira A., ed. The Trouser Press Guide to '90s Rock: The all-new 5th edition of The Trouser Press Record Guide. New York: Simon & Schuster, 1997. ISBN 0684814374.
- Sok, G.W. A Mix of Bricks & Valentines: Lyrics 1979–2009. New York: PM Press, 2011.
- Temporary Services. Group Work. New York: Printed Matter, March 2007.
