= Ab Baars =

Dutch saxophonist and clarinetist

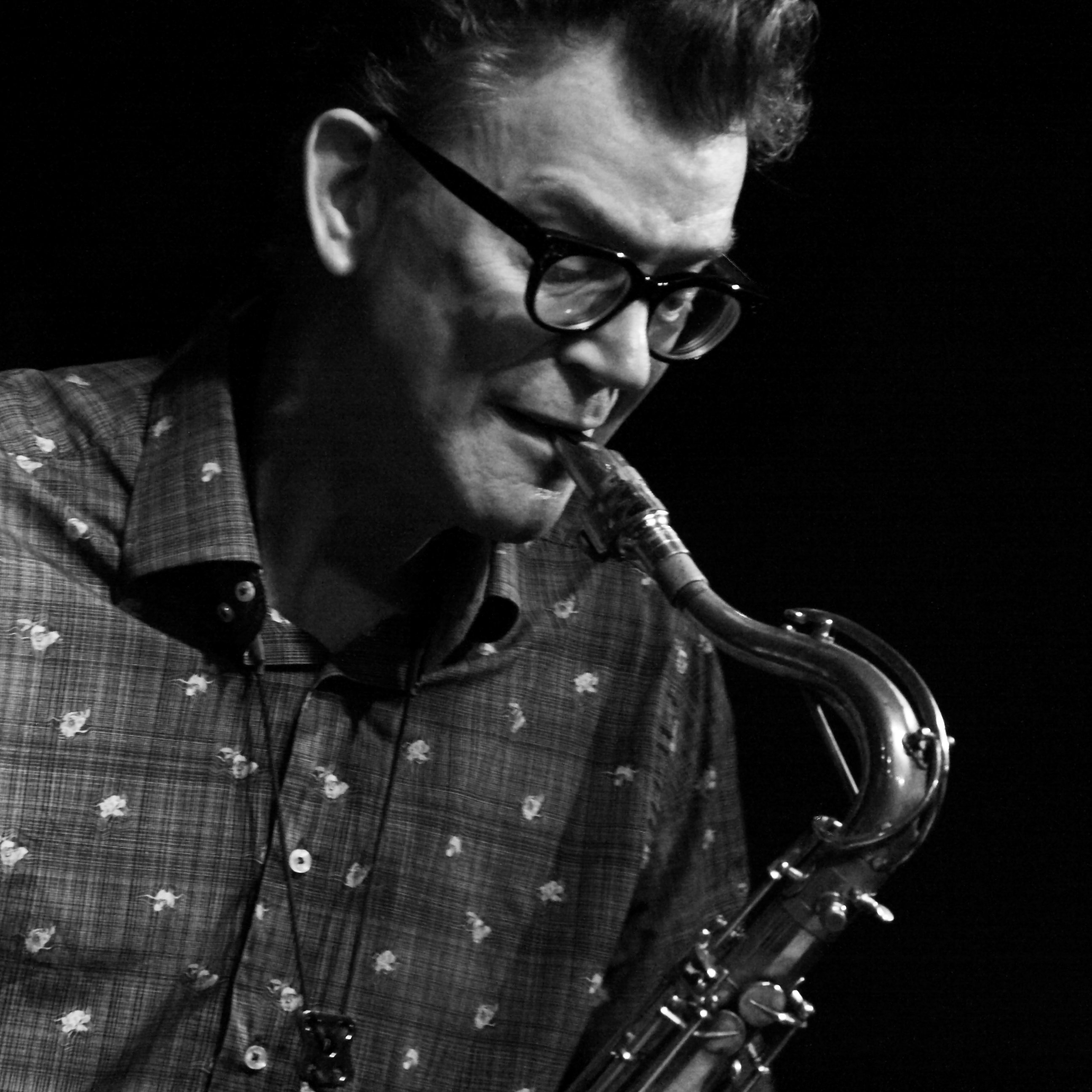
Ab Baars

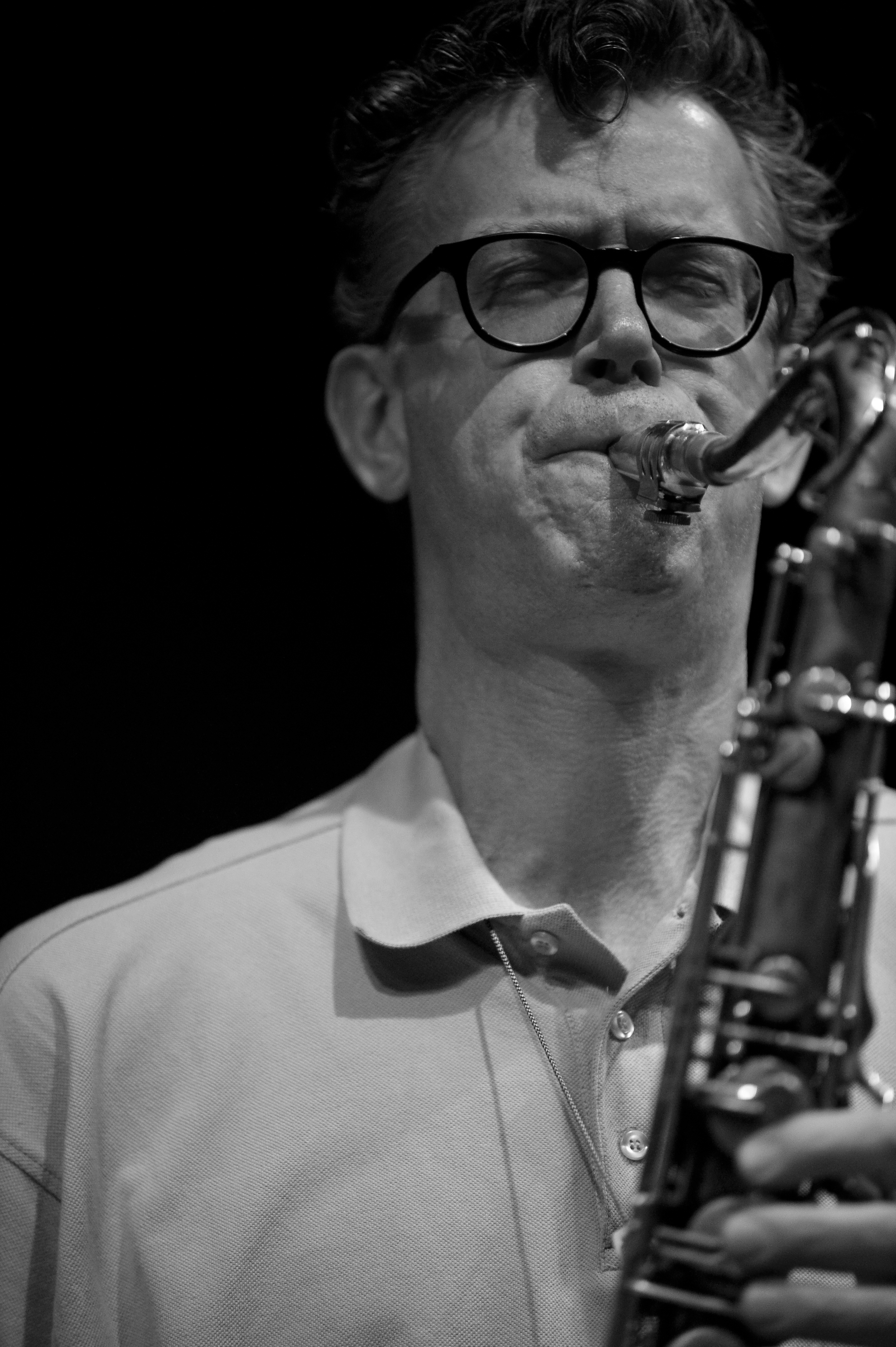
Ab Baars, Buffalo, New York, 2009

Ab Baars (born 21 November 1955 in Axel, Netherlands) is a Dutch saxophonist and clarinetist who has had an active performance career since the 1970s. He has recorded several albums for the Geestgronden Records, Atavistic Records and WIG records.

Baars began studying the piano and music theory at the age of 5. At 15 he began pursuing studies on the tenor saxophone and was soon after playing in wind ensembles. At the age of 18 he entered the Rotterdam Conservatory where he pursued saxophone studies in both classical and contemporary styles of music like jazz and rock. He later pursued clarinet studies in Los Angeles with John Carter in 1989. Baars' 1997 album A Free Step was dedicated to recording previously unheard compositions by Carter who had died in 1991.

While a student in Rotterdam, Baars became a member of the Orkest de Volharding under leader Theo Loevendie. His participation in that group introduced him to several of his long time musical collaborators in concerts and on disc, including tubist Larry Fishkind, violinist Ig Henneman, keyboardist Guus Janssen, composer/pianist Misha Mengelberg, cornetist Butch Morris and trombonist Wolter Wierbos. In the 1980s he expanded his repertoire to include performances on the soprano and baritone saxophones in addition to the tenor saxophone. In 1986 he became a member of the ICP Orchestra. With bassist Wilbert de Joode and drummer Martin Van Duynhoven he formed a jazz trio in 1989. Beginning in 1996 the trio occasionally added a fourth guest member in concerts and recordings, trombonist Roswell Rudd.

Since 1989, Baars has periodically performed as a guest artist with the Dutch punk band The Ex.
