= History Is What's Happening =

Studio album by The Ex
- Released: March 1982
- Recorded: at Joke's Koeienverhuurbedrijf in Schellingwoude, NL
- Genre: Anarcho-punk
- Length: 31:25
- Labels: More DPM (Dirt Per Minute); Reissued on CD by Ex Records
- Producer: Dolf Planteydt

The Ex chronology
Disturbing Domestic Peace (1980)	History Is What's Happening (1982)	Tumult (1983)

Professional ratings
Review scores
Source	Rating
AllMusic	3/5 stars
Tom Hull	A−

History is What's Happening is the second album Dutch punk rock band The Ex, originally released in 1982.

== Background ==
Released two years after the band's first album, History is What's Happening comprises studio recording of songs that The Ex had been playing live throughout 1981, supplemented by material developed in the studio.

The album's 20 songs cover such topics as Dutch domestic policy ("Six of One and a Half Dozen of the Other"), the squatter movement ("Barricades"), increased mechanization within the workplace ("Machinery"), government interference ("Watch-Dogs"), and media's influence over politics ("Who Pays"). As with the previous album, The Ex included an 24-page illustrated lyric booklet and large poster within the album jacket.

The group recorded the songs in the spray paint room of the factory owned by the guitarist's uncle in Zaandam, later adding vocals and overdubs at Dolf Planteijdt's Koeienverhuur ("Cow Rental") Studio, completing recording in December 1981. After their success in selling all 4,500 copies of Disturbing Domestic Peace a year earlier, the band's distributor requested 10,000 copies of History is What's Happening. But by the time of its release in March 1982, The Ex's drummer had left the band, leaving them unable to gig to promote the album, leaving the band with unsold copies for the next 15 years.

== Cover ==
The album's front jacket photo features the Jewish orchestra at the concentration camp at Janowska in Poland. The musicians are seen standing playing in a circle around conductor Yacub Mund while Nazi officers converse off to the side. The SS often forced the orchestra to perform during execution proceedings and eventually executed the musicians while they were performing a piece.

== Reissues ==
The album was first issued on CD, along with The Ex's entire back catalog, in 1993, and then as a digital download on Bandcamp in the 2010s. The American label Superior Viaduct announced that it would be reissuing the album in its original 12" LP format, including a 23" x 16" poster and 24-page booklet, in September 2020.

== Track listing ==
1. "Six of One and Half a Dozen of the Other" - 0:56
2. "Barricades" - 1:03
3. "Life Live" - 1:38
4. "Machinery" - 0:46
5. "E.M.Why" - 1:47
6. "Moving Pictures" - 1:32
7. "Shoes" - 1:45
8. "Watch-Dogs" - 1:49
9. "Dutch Disease" - 1:21
10. "Blessed Box at the Backseat" - 1:14
11. "Who Pays" - 2:44
12. "Strong & Muscled" - 1:30
13. "Grey" - 2:22
14. "Equals Only" - 1:46
15. "H'wood - W'ton" - 0:56
16. "Sports" - 1:02
17. "$" - 0:56
18. "Pep Talk" - 1:58
19. "Attacked" - 1:55
20. "148" - 2:25

== Personnel ==
- Terrie (guitar)
- G.W. Sok (vocals)
- Bas (bass)
- Wim (drums)

== Notes ==
- Cogan, Brian. Encyclopedia of Punk Music and Culture. Westport, Conn.: Greenwood Press, 2006. p. 70. ISBN 978-0-313-33340-8.
- Mount, Heather. "Three Looks into The Ex". In Crane, Larry. Tape Op: The Book about Creative Music Recording, Volume 2. Milwaukee: Hal Leonard Corporation, 2010. pp. 230–233.
- Robbins, Ira A., ed. The Trouser Press Guide to '90s Rock: The all-new 5th edition of The Trouser Press Record Guide. New York: Simon & Schuster, 1997. ISBN 0684814374.
- Sok, G.W. A Mix of Bricks & Valentines: Lyrics 1979–2009. New York: PM Press, 2011.
- Temporary Services. Group Work. New York: Printed Matter, March 2007.
