= Catch My Shoe =

Studio album by The Ex
- Released: January 25, 2011
- Recorded: March 22–24, 2010
- Studio: Electrical Audio
- Genre: Art punk, noise rock
- Length: 53:36
- Label: Fishtank/Carrot Top
- Producer: Steve Albini, Bob Weston, The Ex

The Ex chronology
30 Years of The Ex (2009)	Catch My Shoe (2011)	Y'Anbessaw Tezeta (2012)

Professional ratings
Aggregate scores
Source	Rating
Metacritic	72/100
Review scores
Source	Rating
AllMusic	4/5 stars
Alternative Press	3.5/5 stars
The Austin Chronicle	3/5 stars
Consequence of Sound	B
NOW	4/5 stars
PopMatters	7/10 stars
Rolling Stone	3.5/5 stars
Spin	6/10 stars
Tiny Mix Tapes	4/5 stars
Tom Hull	B+

Catch My Shoe is an album by Dutch anarchist band The Ex. It is the band's first record after the departure of their original vocalist G.W. Sok and features Arnold de Boer, from the band Zea, on vocals, guitar and keyboard. It is also the band's first album recorded without a bass player, and has The Ex's two other guitarists trading off duties on lower pitched six-string baritone guitars. Two songs contain overdubbed brass lines recorded by Sicilian jazz trumpeter Roy Paci.

== Content ==
On Catch My Shoe The Ex combine their usual art punk-style with influences from African music. One track ("Maybe I Was The Pilot") features a guitar line from a 1950s Ugandan harp player, and another ("Eoleyo") is a cover of a song that the band found on a cassette by Ethiopian singer Mahmoud Ahmed.

== Reception ==
The album received "generally favorable" reviews according to Metacritic, with a score of 72 based on 9 reviews. Critics generally praised the contributions of the rest of the band and remarked upon their consistency. "How many bands can weather the loss of a founding member who's been a mainstay for 30 years, then come out on the other side like they haven't missed a beat?" asked Popmatters' Arnold Pan, praising the track "Keep On Walking" as a "rallying cry" that "casts the new Ex in a new light, a worthy acknowledgment of their legacy that also promises much more to come. And how many bands with the Ex's longevity and history can you say that about?" Joanne Huffa of NOW praised the contributions of Katherina Bornefeld's drumming: "Perhaps more than any other element, her incorporation of rhythm into the songs' very fabric is key to the Ex's sound." "As a whole, this record bodes well for the future of The Ex", writes Adam Kivel of Consequence of Sound, "It’s got hooks and noise, songs to dance to and songs for fighting. The lineup change isn’t the cause of this, though; instead, it’s just further proof that Moor, Bornefeld, and Hessels were just as important and powerful as Sok in the band’s mixture. Sok will be missed, but this record is too good to whine about his leaving." Richard Elliot of Tiny Mix Tapes writes: "The variety of musical textures that The Ex layer into each performance make for continued interest and invite repeated listening. They also ensure that, while political messages inform the lyrics as much as ever, musical style is the star. Ex songs are wordy without being preachy, serious without being solemn, faithful to the funk as much as to the band’s philosophy."

However, the reception to Arnold de Boer's contributions were quite mixed, with many comparing him unfavorably to G.W. Sok and criticizing his vocals and lyrics. While his inclusion was praised by the likes of Jesse Jarnow of Allmusic and Chuck Eddy of Rolling Stone, the same was pointedly criticized by the likes of Jessica Hopper of Spin and Jason Heller of The A.V. Club. The former writes that "DeBoer’s political poesy lacks his predecessor’s acerbic wit, and his singsong delivery is much less bracing than Sok’s full-throated rant. Essentially, DeBoer is the Sammy Hagar of anarcho-punk [...] when collaborating, as it has before, with everyone from Sonic Youth to Tortoise, The Ex has always absorbed the flavor of whatever it’s paired with—and de Boer is mostly flavorless. His hiccupping, singsong vocals try to operate on the same level as Sok’s raspy, poetic chants, but the result is tentative and forceless." She also described his lyrics on "Cold Weather is Back" as making him sound like a "cartoon radical". The same lyrics were also criticized by Audra Schroder of The Austin Chronicle: "he rages against technology like it's something new, the blast of brass saving it from caricature." According to The Wire: "It's tempting to consider The Ex as Holland's The Fall, but that wouldn't be quite right--de Boer's pronouncements lack the gnomic bite of Mark E Smith." Elsewhere, Alternative Press criticized the lack of a "low-end" on the album's sound.

Electrelane named Catch My Shoe as one of their top ten favourite records of all time.

== Track listing ==
1. "Maybe I Was the Pilot" 5:36
2. "Double Order" 6:20
3. "Cold Weather Is Back" 6:32
4. "Bicycle Illusion" 6:48
5. "Eoleyo" 5:45
6. "Tree Float" 5:53
7. "Keep On Walking" 6:05
8. "Life Whining" 3:23
9. "24 Problems" 7:05

== Single and out takes ==
An alternate version of "Maybe I Was the Pilot" was released as a single without Roy Paci's trumpet work, backed with the non-album track "Our Leaky Homes". An alternate take of "Double Order" was released as a download on The Ex's website in 2009.

== Personnel ==
- Arnold de Boer - vocals, guitar, samples
- Andy Moor - guitar, baritone guitar
- Terrie Hessels - guitar, baritone guitar
- Katherina Bornefeld - drums, vocals
- Roy Paci - trumpet on tracks 1 and 3
