= Turn (The Ex album) =

Studio album by The Ex
- Released: 14 September 2004
- Recorded: 16–18 September 2003 at Electrical Audio, Chicago; 22 November 2003 and 20 February 2004 at Studio Le Roy, Amsterdam
- Genre: Post-punk, art punk, noise rock, experimental rock
- Length: Disc one: 44:16; Disc two: 42:40
- Label: Touch and Go Records
- Producer: Steve Albini (Chicago sessions); Mikel Le Roy (Amsterdam sessions)

The Ex chronology
In the Fishtank 9 (2001)	Turn (2004)	Singles. Period. The Vinyl Years 1980–1990 (2005)

Turn is a double album by Dutch anarchist post-punk band The Ex. After 20 years of working with Luc, their former bass guitarist, Turn is the only Ex album to feature double bass player Rosemarie giving the band a sound akin their prior work with cellist Tom Cora. In tandem with The Ex's drummer Katrin, Rosemarie also contributed significant female vocal harmonies to the album.

The album received critical acclaim and has been singled out by many publications as the band's best album yet.

== Background & Recording ==
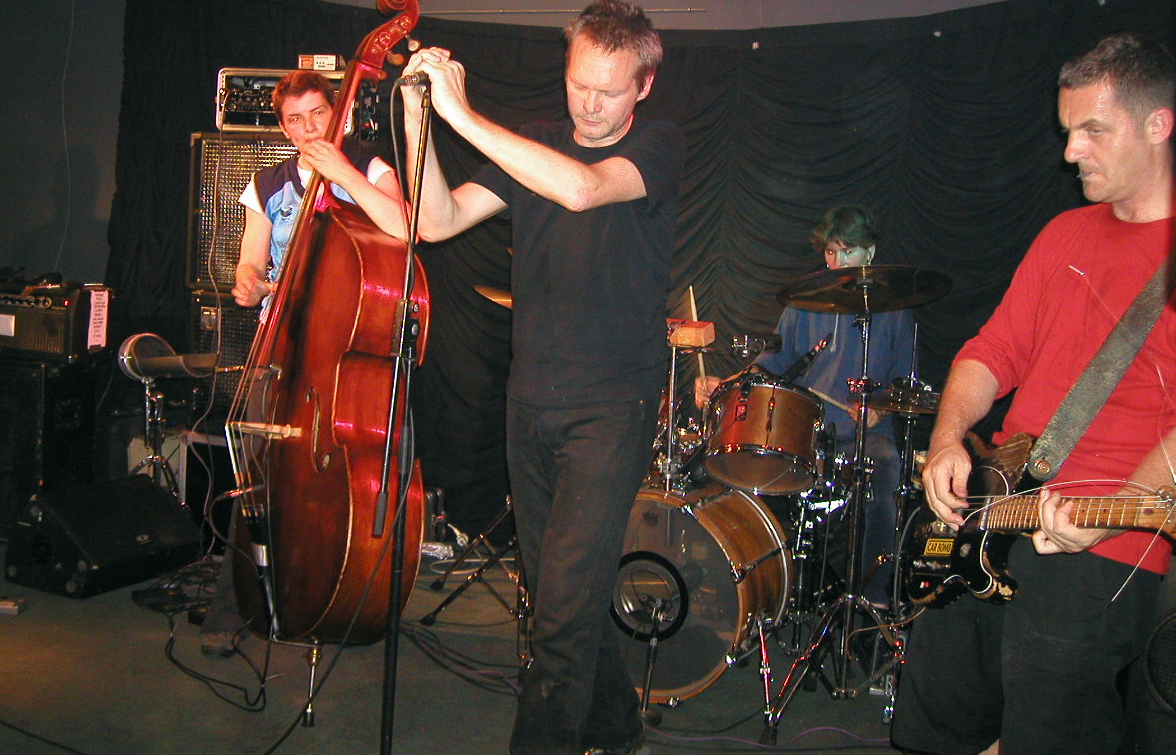
Turn is The Ex's sole studio album to feature contrabassist Rozemarie Heggen, pictured here with bandmates G.W. Sok, Katherina Bornefeld, and Andy Moor at a 2004 concert in Germany.

Turn displays the influence of African rhythms and melodies on the band's music. On "Theme From Konono" The Ex's guitars imitate amplified thumb pianos in tribute to the Congolese percussion group Konono Nº 1 who had toured Europe with The Ex. "Getatchew" pays tribute to Ethiopian Saxophone legend Getatchew Mekuria with whom The Ex would later record an album. Turn also features The Ex playing the Eritrean revolutionary song "Huriyet" set to a traditional Tigrinya beat.

Turn was recorded by Steve Albini at Electrical Audio, Chicago, and mixed by Mikel Le Roy and The Ex at Studio Le Roy, Amsterdam, Netherlands.

== Critical reception ==
Professional ratings
Review scores
Source	Rating
Cokemachineglow	76%
Mondo Sonoro	7/10
NOW	4/5 stars
Ox-Fanzine	9/10
Pitchfork Media	8.8/10
PopMatters	7/10 stars
Robert Christgau	(choice cut)
Sputnikmusic	4/5
Tom Hull	A−

Peter Margasak of the Chicago Reader wrote in 2006 that Turn might be the Ex's best album yet, writing that "the addition of upright bassist Rozemarie Heggen, whose classical technique allowed them to explore dissonant textures without sacrificing rhythmic power, seemed to give the band a new focus and energy." Joe Tangari of Pitchfork wrote that their "ambitious double-disc set" finds them "elevat[ing] their craft to near perfection over the course of two wild, unpredictable, and unforgettable discs [...] you'd never guess any of these people are over 40." According to him, despite being "25 years into their career, [this album] may be their best." Daniel Fetherston of Allmusic wrote that the album "proves that they are still capable of making edgy, urgent, and relevant music [...] in their world, it's still 1982, and bands like The Pop Group, Wire, and Gang of 4 are their peers. While many younger bands at the time of this album's release were updating that past era's sound, TURN bolsters the argument that those who did it first are, in fact, those that do it best."

In its November 2009 issue, Spanish magazine Rockdelux named it the 67th best album of the 2000s. In 2012, Tom Breihan of Stereogum named it the 19th best album recorded by Albini.

== Track listing ==
=== Disc one ===
1. "Listen To The Painters" - 4:13
2. "Prism Song" - 5:51
3. "Dog Tree" - 6:28
4. "Getatchew" - 5:05
5. "The Pie" - 8:46
6. "3:45 AM" - 5:26
7. "IP Man" - 8:27

=== Disc two ===
1. "Theme From Konono" - 8:24
2. "Huriyet" - 5:11
3. "Sister" - 6:24
4. "Confusion Errorist" - 4:49
5. "The Idunno Law" - 5:11
6. "Henry K" - 4:59
7. "In The Event" - 7:42

== Personnel ==
- Katrin (drums, vocals)
- Terrie (guitar)
- Andy (guitar)
- Rozemarie (acoustic bass, vocals)
- G.W. Sok (vocals)
