= Een Rondje Holland =

Live album by The Ex
- Released: 2001
- Recorded: 2000
- Genre: Punk rock, experimental, orchestral, jazz
- Label: Ex Records
- Producer: Dolf Planteijdt and Zlaya

The Ex chronology
Dizzy Spells (2001)	Een Rondje Holland (2001)	In the Fishtank 9 (2001)

Een Rondje Holland is a live album by Ex Orkest, an orchestra made up of the Dutch post-punk band The Ex accompanied by 20 other musicians. The album features orchestral arrangements of previously released Ex songs (often with the band's standard English lyrics replaced with those in their native Dutch) mixed with pieces of improvised music. The tracks were recorded over a series of four performances in the Netherlands, Germany and Belgium, and compiled for release on the band's own label in 2001.

Professional ratings
Review scores
Source	Rating
Allmusic	3.5/5 stars
Tom Hull	B+

== Track listing ==
1. "De Weg"
2. "Kokend Asfalt"
3. "Symfonie Voor Machines"
4. "Meer Nieuws"
5. "Spruitjes"
6. "Een Rondje Holland"
7. "Gronings Liedje"
8. "My Happiness"
9. "Rosenkohl"
10. "Uitgeest"
11. "Stukverdriet"
12. "De Klokkenluider"

== Personnel ==
- Terrie (guitar)
- G.W. Sok (vocals)
- Luc (acoustic bass)
- Andy Moor (guitar)
- Katrin (drums, vocals)
- Jaap Blonk (vocals)
- Han Buhrs (vocals)
- Jan Mulder (vocals)
- Roy Paci (trumpet)
- Felicity Provan (trumpet)
- Wilf Plum (drums)
- Michael Vatcher (drums, percussion)
- Ferry Heyne (valve trombone, trumpet, tuba)
- Wolter Wierbos (trombone)
- Joost Buis (trombone)
- Michael Moore (saxophone, clarinet)
- Wilbert de Joode (double-bass)
- Ernst Glerum (double-bass)
- Gert-Jan Blom (singing saw, groove-box)
- Hamish McKeich (director, electric bassoon)
