= Wolter Wierbos =

Dutch trombonist

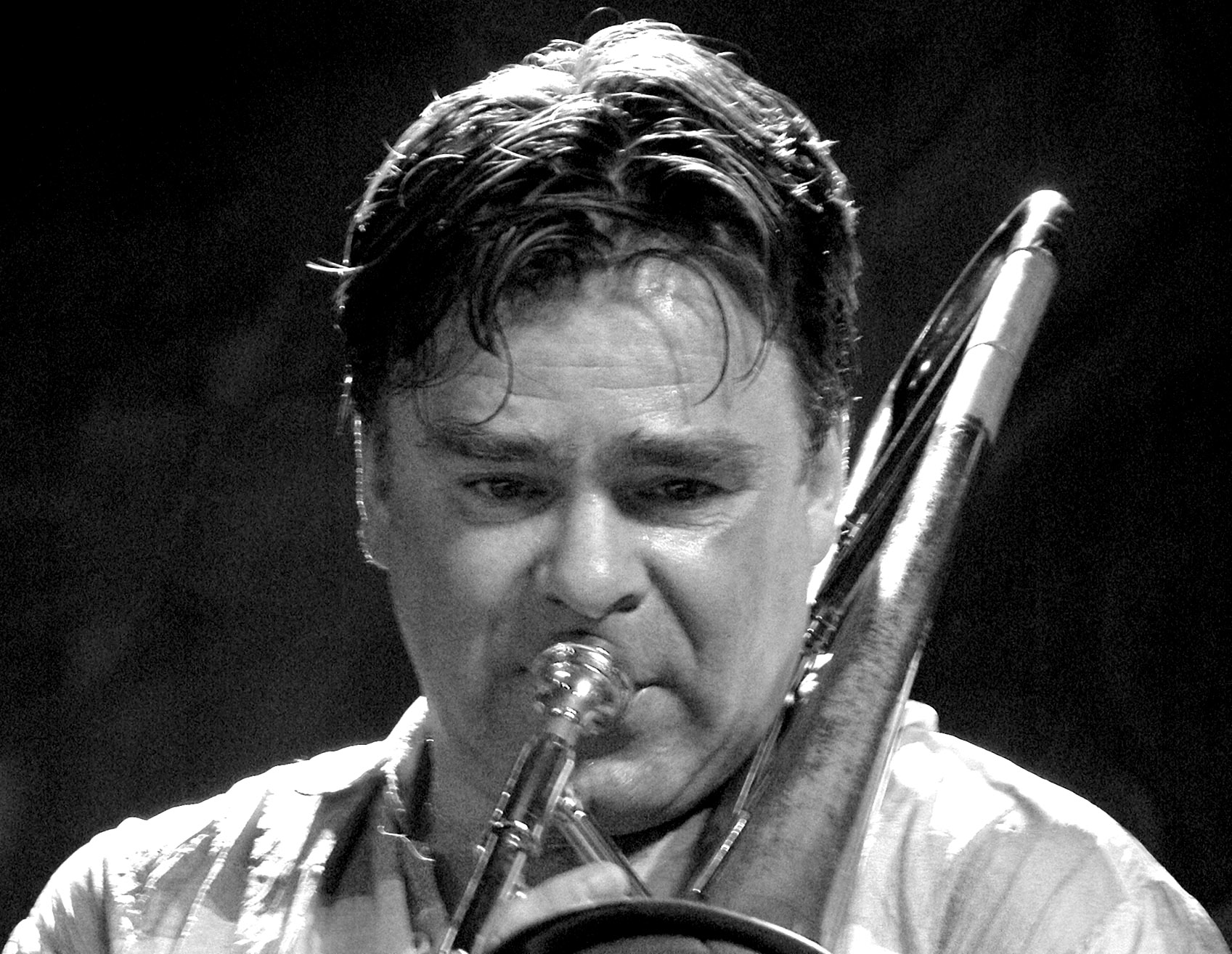
Wolter Wierbos photo courtesy Seth Tisue

Wolter Wierbos (born 1 September 1957, in Holten, Overijssel) is a Dutch trombonist.

Wierbos has played throughout Europe, Canada, USA and Asia. Wierbos has many awards to his name, including the Podiumprijs for Jazz and Improvised music and the most important Dutch jazz award, the VPRO/Boy Edgar Award in 1995.

Since 1979 he has played with numerous music ensembles: Cumulus (with Ab Baars and Harry de Wit), JC Tans & Rockets, Theo Loevendie Quintet, Guus Janssen Septet, Loos (Peter van Bergen), Maarten Altena Ensemble and Podiumtrio. He led his own band, Celebration of Difference, and has been involved in theater, dance, television and film projects. He has been invited to play with The Ex, Sonic Youth, Gruppo Sportivo and the Nieuw Ensemble (led by Ed Spanjaard).

He has also played with Henry Threadgill, The Berlin Contemporary Jazz Orchestra (led by Alexander von Schlippenbach), the European Big Band (led by Cecil Taylor), the John Carter Project, Mingus Big Band (Epitaph, directed by Gunther Schuller). He is currently active with Misha Mengelberg's Instant Composers Pool (Down Beat Poll winner 2002, Talent Deserving Wider Recognition), Gerry Hemingway Quintet, Franky Douglas' Sunchild, Bik Bent Braam, Albrecht Maurer Trio Works, Nocando, Carl Ludwig Hübsch's Longrun Development of the Universe, Frank Gratkowski Quartet, Available Jelly and Sean Bergin's MOB.

Wierbos also maintains a solo career. He has a running project under the name Wollo's World, where he brings together different artistic combinations, ranging from duos with tap-dancer Marije Nie and bassist Wilbert de Joode to a quartet with Misha Mengelberg, Mats Gustafsson and Wilbert de Joode.

Wolter Wierbos can be heard on more than 100 CDs and LPs. He has released two solo CDs: X Caliber (ICP 032, 1995), "a round-trip tour of his horn, from buzzing mute mutations, grizzly blurts and purring multiphonics to radiant melodies", and Wierbos (DATA 824), a reissue of his 1982 solo LP with an additional track.
