= Pokkeherrie =

Studio album by The Ex
- Released: September 1985
- Recorded: Emma's Koeienverhuurbedrijf, Amsterdam, Netherlands
- Genre: Anarcho-punk; post-punk; noise rock; experimental rock
- Length: 53:07
- Label: Pokabilly
- Producer: Dolf Planteydt

The Ex chronology
Blueprints for a Blackout (1984)	Pokkeherrie (1985)	1936, The Spanish Revolution (1985)

Professional ratings
Review scores
Source	Rating
AllMusic	4.5/5 stars
Tom Hull	B+

Pokkeherrie (Dutch for "terrible noise") is a 1985 album by The Ex, originally released on vinyl only on the Pokabilly label. The original release included an eleven-page booklet containing lyrics & artwork and a double sided poster. It was reissued on compact disc in 1995 on Ex Records. The album comprises a collection of songs the group had performed on an anti-military tour. The title of the album is a Dutch word that means something like "so much noise" or "awful noise". It is the first of the Ex's albums to feature Katrin on drums, cementing the band's core lineup that would last for nearly two decades.

== Background ==
After releasing a record in support of Britain's coalminers' strike, The Ex wrote a collection of new songs for an anti-military tour that would form the basis for Pokkeherrie. Their drummer Sabien had just left the band to move to France and was replaced by German-born Katerina, previously of the Stuttgart trio 3Musketiere. The group recorded nine songs in the newly built Koeienverhuur Studio in the basement of a newly squatted building in Amsterdam where The Ex also rehearsed and gigged at the volunteer-run Emma venue. The album was released in September 1985 and, as with previous releases, contained a poster and a big booklet full of lyrics accompanied by drawings, this time portraits of visual artists whom the band admired. The album also features text by poet Nico van Apeldoorn.

The Ex supported Pokkeherrie's release with tours of Britain, Denmark, Germany and Switzerland. The album was reissued on CD, along with the rest of the band's back catalog, in 1993 on their own Ex Records. The Ex eventually added it to their roster of online titles streamable and downloadable through Bandcamp.

== Reception ==
John Dougan's short review of the album for AllMusic reads: "Primal leftist politics meet primal mega-loud guitar. Stunning." An unattributed review on the band's official website calls the album "a masterful killer weapon of raw power that rattles up the spine into numbed pink brain cells and fills the vacuum with social issue."

== Track listing ==
1. "Nurse!" - 6:09
2. "Soviet Threat" - 7:08
3. "Mmm Crisis" - 3:29
4. "1,000,000 Ashtrays" - 9:15
5. "Pokk" - 0:15
6. "White Liberals" - 5:42
7. "Everything We Never Wanted" 4:28
8. "Friendly Neighbours" - 4:20
9. "Hit the Headlines" - 5:47
10. "Rumours of Music (The Original Soundcrack)" - 6:29

== Credits ==
- Terrie - guitar
- G.W. Sok - voice
- Luc - bass
- Katrin - drums

== Notes ==
- Cogan, Brian. Encyclopedia of Punk Music and Culture. Westport, Conn.: Greenwood Press, 2006. p. 70. ISBN 978-0-313-33340-8.
- Mount, Heather. "Three Looks into The Ex". In Crane, Larry. Tape Op: The Book about Creative Music Recording, Volume 2. Milwaukee: Hal Leonard Corporation, 2010. pp. 230–233.
- Robbins, Ira A., ed. The Trouser Press Guide to '90s Rock: The all-new 5th edition of The Trouser Press Record Guide. New York: Simon & Schuster, 1997. ISBN 0684814374.
- Sok, G.W. A Mix of Bricks & Valentines: Lyrics 1979–2009. New York: PM Press, 2011.
- Temporary Services. Group Work. New York: Printed Matter, March 2007.
