= Blueprints for a Blackout =

Studio album by The Ex
- Released: March 1984
- Recorded: Dec 20, 1983 – Jan 5, 1984 at Joke's Koeienverhuurbedrijf, Schellingwoude, Netherlands
- Genres: Post-punk; anarcho-punk; noise rock; industrial
- Length: 66:11
- Labels: Original 2 x LP on Pig Brother Productions; Reissued on CD by Ex Records
- Producers: Dolf Planteijdt and Jon Langford.

The Ex chronology
Tumult (1983)	Blueprints for a Blackout (1984)	Pokkeherrie (1985)

Professional ratings
Review scores
Source	Rating
AllMusic	3/5 stars
Tom Hull	B+

Blueprints for a Blackout is the fifth album (and the first double album) by Dutch post-punk band The Ex, originally released in 1984. It was the first of The Ex's albums to feature Luc playing bass guitar and he would remain as the band's bass player for 20 years. The album also featured many guest musicians, a notable trend in The Ex's discography that would provide musical elements unique to each of their albums.

== Background ==
Blueprints for a Blackout saw The Ex starting to expand beyond the standard guitar-bass-drum format of punk with forays into other instruments such as organ, beer crates, and oil barrels.

In the transition from December 1983 to January 1984 The Ex spent two weeks improvising, writing and recording at Dolf's Koeienverhuur "Cow Rental" Studio in rural Schellingwoude outside of Amsterdam. New songs were developed by the musicians, after which vocalist G.W. Sok wrote lyrics and recorded vocals, and these supplemented preexisting songs that the band had played live at the time. The group had also made field recordings to add as samples to their tracks, including an oil-barrel dropped down several stories of concrete stairs, or the sound of a marching army. The band also began to experiment creating effects with long loops of analog tape and had guest collaborators in The Mekons' Jon Langford, Marcel Schmidt, Alex van Zanten, and members of various Dutch groups.

The record's front sleeve image was taken from the Swiss documentary Heute Und Danach (“Today and Thereafter”) and contained a 12" square 20-page lyric-and-photo booklet, as well as a full-size poster about the recent eviction of the Wyers squat in Amsterdam. The original double-LP saw release in February 1984 on The Ex's own Pig Brother Productions imprint, and debuted on CD, along with The Ex's entire back catalog, in 1993 on the band's own label, Ex Records. The band has included the album as part of its download and streaming catalog via Bandcamp.

== Reception ==
John Dougan of AllMusic writes: "Double-album. Simplistic and excessive but interesting. Out of print." Tracks 2 to 4 were selected as highlights. Trouser Press wrote that the band "[employ] such musical implements as organ, beer crates and oil barrels [...] further expanding its sonic palette with guest musicians." An unattributed review on the band's official website reads: "It's caustic. A real burner. [...] While still retaining an all important relevant edge to their musical comment, they've introduced elements of tunesmithing, attack, decay and composition that places them head and shoulders above their contemporaries."

== Track listing ==
1. "Streetcars Named Desire" / "Animal Harm" (medley) - 2:39
2. "Blueprints for a Blackout" - 3:53
3. "Rabble with a Cause" - 2:19
4. "Requiem for a Rip-Off" - 2:52
5. "Pleased to Meat You" - 4:16
6. "A Goodbuy to You" - 3:38
7. "The Swim" - 1:47
8. "Boohoo" - 2:28
9. "U.S. Hole" - 2:41
10. "(Not) 2b Continued" - 1:09
11. "Grimm Stories" - 4:52
12. "A Plague to Survive" - 5:22
13. "The Rise of the Dutch Republic" - 3:53
14. "Kidnap Connection" - 2:16
15. "Fire and Ice" - 4:41
16. "Jack Frost Is Innocent" - 2:53
17. "Love You Till Eh" - 2:47
18. "Food On 45" - 3:17
19. "Scrub That Scum" - 8:19

== Personnel ==
=== The Ex ===
- Terrie (guitar)
- G.W. Sok (vocals)
- Luc (bass)
- Yoke (bass)
- Sabien (drums)

Various members played double-bass, organ, violin, oil-barrels, accordion, beer-crates, piano.

=== Guest musicians ===
- Kees (oboe, flute, saxophones)
- Jon Langford (marimba, rhythmbox, guitar)
- Dolf Planteijdt (guitar, drums)
- Vazant (saxophone)
- Marcel (marimba, drums)
- Adrie (drums)
- Bas (bass, double-bass)
- Ferrie (trumpet).

== Notes ==
- Cogan, Brian. Encyclopedia of Punk Music and Culture. Westport, Conn.: Greenwood Press, 2006. p. 70. ISBN 978-0-313-33340-8.
- Mount, Heather. "Three Looks into The Ex". In Crane, Larry. Tape Op: The Book about Creative Music Recording, Volume 2. Milwaukee: Hal Leonard Corporation, 2010. pp. 230–233.
- Robbins, Ira A., ed. The Trouser Press Guide to '90s Rock: The all-new 5th edition of The Trouser Press Record Guide. New York: Simon & Schuster, 1997. ISBN 0684814374.
- Sok, G.W. A Mix of Bricks & Valentines: Lyrics 1979–2009. New York: PM Press, 2011.
- Temporary Services. Group Work. New York: Printed Matter, March 2007.
