= Tumult (album) =

Studio album by The Ex
- Released: April 1983
- Recorded: 10–19 January 1983 at Koeienverhuur Studio
- Genre: Post-punk; art punk; noise rock; industrial music
- Length: 53:20
- Label: Original LP on FAI Records; Reissued on CD by Ex Records (Europe) and Fistpuppet (USA)
- Producer: Jon Langford and Dolf Anonymusfortaxreasons

The Ex chronology
Dignity of Labour (1983)	Tumult (1983)	Blueprints for a Blackout (1984)

Professional ratings
Review scores
Source	Rating
AllMusic	4.5/5 stars
Tom Hull	B+

Tumult is the fourth album by Dutch anarchist punk rock band The Ex, originally released in 1983. It was produced by Jon Langford of The Mekons and Dolf Planteijdt (credited as "Dolf Anonymusfortaxreasons" in the album's credits).

== Background ==
Right after recording their Dignity of Labour box set, The Ex returned to Koeienverhuur "Cow Rental" Studio to record the 13 songs for Tumult in January 1983. The Ex's perennial recordist Dolf Planteijdt, co-produced the album with Jon Langford of British bands The Mekons and The Three Johns, who was also recording the Dutch group Eton Crop in Dolf's studio. The album saw release in April, one month after the band's previous release, and featured a gatefold sleeve along with a full-size poster in its original pressing. The cover's stark red-white-and-black painting depicts a prisoner bending cell bars to break free, The album's insert bore the phrase, The record's poster announces "hometaping is killing record companies...and it's about time." this time adapted from Roode Hulp (“Red Help”) poster drawing attention to political prisoners needing aid.

The album was first issued on CD, along with The Ex's entire back catalog, in 1993, and then as a digital download on Bandcamp in the 2010s.

== Reception ==
Stewart Mason's review of the album for AllMusic was quite positive, writing that the band "are something of a rarity in political rock circles, in that their albums are at least as musically interesting as they are lyrically pungent." He praised Jon Langford's production, who "gives the band a slightly more structured sound, which turns out to be to their advantage; in so doing, Langford minimizes the group's obvious points of comparison (singer G.W. Sok sounds more than a little like the Fall's Mark E. Smith) and makes them sound more like their own band." The opening track "Bouquet of Barbed Wire", picked as a highlight from the album, was described as "build[ing] slowly from a hypnotic guitar riff, adding instruments one at a time before exploding into an intense post-punk roar". The "declamatory" "Squat!" was picked as another "musical and sociological high point" while the closing track "Island Race" "ends with an industrial clanging that predates the early records by Test Department and Einsturzende Neubauten." An unattributed review on The Ex's official website describes the album as the "[m]usic of malcontents, rebellion and impotent rage about everything that is wrong in this world [...] But they're quite aware themselves, too, that reality is not always black and white [...] What they lack in pure originality, gets compensated by their passion and devotion. In a time during which many of their contemporaries have switched their brain off, the primeval music of The Ex sounds really beneficial."

== Track listing ==
1. "Bouquet of Barbed Wire" - 6:58
2. "Fear" - 2:17
3. "Hunt the Hunters" - 3:34
4. "Survival of the Fattest" - 5:18
5. "Red Muzak" - 2:44
6. "Happy Thoughts" - 5:33
7. "The Well-Known Soldier" - 2:22
8. "Black and White Statements" - 4:39
9. "Squat!" - 2:25
10. "Same Old News" - 2:08
11. "F.U.N.E.I.D.Y." - 5:23
12. "O.S.L. (New Schvienhunt League)" - 2:42
13. "Island Race" - 7:17

== Personnel & Credits ==
Adapted from Discogs:

- Bass – Bas
- Drums – Sabien
- Guitar – Terrie
- "Lacquer Cut"– Porky
- Recording – Dolf Anonymousfortaxreasons, Jon Langford
- Vocals – Cobie, GW Sok
- Writing – The Ex

== Notes ==
- Cogan, Brian. Encyclopedia of Punk Music and Culture. Westport, Conn.: Greenwood Press, 2006. p. 70. ISBN 978-0-313-33340-8.
- Mount, Heather. "Three Looks into The Ex". In Crane, Larry. Tape Op: The Book About Creative Music Recording, Volume 2. Milwaukee: Hal Leonard Corporation, 2010. pp. 230–233.
- Robbins, Ira A., ed. The Trouser Press Guide to '90s Rock: The all-new 5th edition of The Trouser Press Record Guide. New York: Simon & Schuster, 1997. ISBN 0684814374.
- Sok, G.W. A Mix of Bricks & Valentines: Lyrics 1979–2009. New York: PM Press, 2011.
- Temporary Services. Group Work. New York: Printed Matter, March 2007.
