= Getatchew Mekurya =

Ethiopian jazz saxophonist

Getatchew Mekurya ጌታቸው መኩሪያ
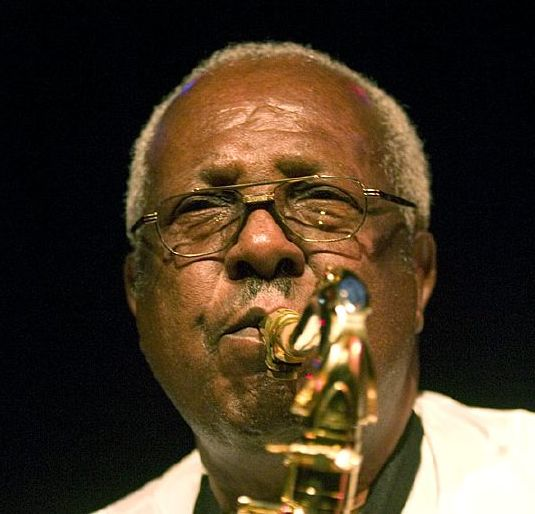

Background information
- Born: Getachew Mekuria; 14 March 1935; Yifat, Shewa, Ethiopian Empire
- Origin: Addis Ababa, Ethiopia
- Died: 4 April 2016 (aged 81) Addis Ababa, Ethiopia
- Genres: Ethiopian music, jazz, Ethio-jazz
- Instrument: Tenor saxophone
- Years active: 1949–2016

Getatchew Mekurya (Amharic: ጌታቸው መኩሪያ; 14 March 1935 – 4 April 2016) was an Ethiopian jazz saxophonist.

== Early career ==
Getatchew Mekurya was born on 14 March 1935, in Yifat, Ethiopia. His father was a honey merchant. Young Getatchew played traditional Ethiopian instruments such as the washint flute, the krar and the masenqo, and later moved on to the saxophone and clarinet.

At age 13, Getatchew began his professional career in 1949 as a part of the Municipality Band in Addis Ababa. In 1955 he joined the house band at Addis' Haile Selassie I Theatre, and in 1965 joined the famous Police Orchestra.

Getatchew was one of the first musicians to record an instrumental version of shellela, a genre of traditional Amhara vocal music sung by warriors before going into battle. Getatchew took the shellela tradition seriously, often appearing onstage in a warrior's animal-skin tunic and lion's mane headdress. He continued to refine his instrumental shellela style, recording an entire album in 1970, Negus of Ethiopian Sax, released on Philips Ethiopia during the heyday of the Ethiojazz movement. Getatchew continued to work alongside many of the biggest orchestras in Addis Ababa, accompanying renowned singers Alemayehu Eshete, Hirut Beqele, and Ayalew Mesfin.

== Later career, collaborations with the Ex and others ==
Getatchew reached an international audience when his album Negus of Ethiopian Sax was re-released as part of the Ethiopiques CD series. Getatchew's playing style has been compared to free jazz, but developed in isolation from it during the early 1950s. Getatchew has said he is unfamiliar with either Ornette Coleman or Albert Ayler.

Dutch avant-garde/punk band the Ex caught the ears of Getatchew, and he invited them to play with him, which they did from 2004 on. Getatchew asked the Ex to be the backing band for his 2006 album, Moa Anbessa. The Ex and Getatchew toured the Netherlands, Belgium and France together in 2006 and 2007, and then the United States in 2008 and Canada in 2009 with members of the group Fendika. A second album with the Ex, Y'Anbessaw Tezeta, was released in 2012.

Getatchew collaborated with numerous other contemporary artists, including British Tamil singer Susheela Raman and Boston jazz ensemble Either/Orchestra. He lived in Addis Ababa, and regularly performed at the Sunset Bar at the Sheraton Addis, and also at Fendika Azmari Bet.

In an interview published by Ethiopian Reporter in January 2012 Getatchew says about Éthiopiques and the copyright of Francis Falceto (Buda Musique record company): "I think that is one of the reasons why Mulatu Astatke despises Frances Falceto. He does not want to see his face. Even if he was able to contribute to the recognition of our music worldwide, on the other hands he used us. He is making tons of money. I do not work with him; I work with other musicians and promoters and I think he is not happy with that fact."

== Personal life ==
Getatchew's wife Ayalech died in 2015. Getatchew died in 2016 of a leg infection caused by diabetes, aged 81. He was survived by nine children and numerous grandchildren.

== Discography ==
- "Shellela" 45 (late 1950s)
- Ethiopiques Volume 14: Negus of Ethiopian Sax (recorded in 1970, originally released on Philips Ethiopia in 1972)
- Ethiopiques Vol. 20: Live in Addis with Either/Orchestra (Mekuria appears on the track "Shellella") (recorded in 2004)
- Moa Anbessa (with the Ex and other guests) (2006)
- Gétatchèw Mèkurya & The Ex + Guests [DVD, Ethiosonic/Buda Musique] (2007)
- Y'Anbessaw Tezeta (with the Ex and Friends, 2012)
- The Rough Guide to the Music of Ethiopia (2012, World Music Network)
