= Andy Moor (guitarist) =

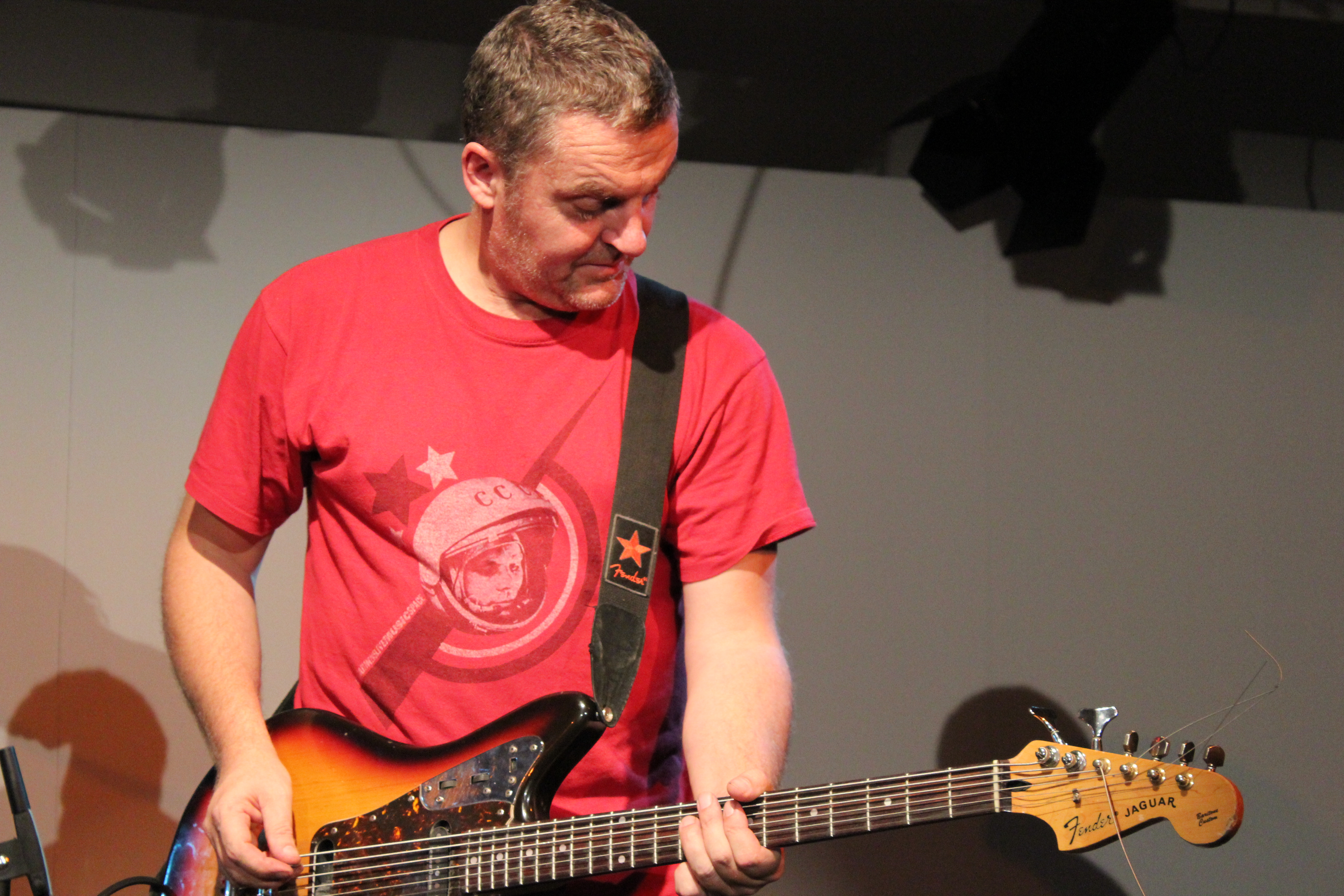

Background information
- Also known as: Andy Ex
- Born: 1962 (age 63–64); London, England
- Origin: United Kingdom
- Genres: Avant-garde music; punk rock; noise; electronic; improvisation
- Instruments: Electric guitar; baritone guitar
- Member of: Dog Faced Hermans; the Ex; Lean Left; Kletka Red

Andy Moor (born 1962) is an English guitarist best known for his work with Dog Faced Hermans and the Ex.

== Biography ==
Moor began his musical life in Edinburgh, Scotland playing guitar with Dog Faced Hermans, an eclectic group that mixed post-punk energy with traditional tunes and improvisations. In 1990 he moved to the Netherlands after an invitation to join Dutch band the Ex. In 1995 he began another group, Kletka Red with Tony Buck, Joe Williamson and Leonid Soybelman, fusing traditional klezmer, Greek and Russian songs with their own styles of playing.

Moor's own background is rooted in the post-punk Britain of the 1980s, but in more recent years he has collaborated with many musicians from varied backgrounds and disciplines. Many of these collaborations are duos, with amongst others Cypriot composer Yannis Kyriakides with whom he performs a set of rebetika songs (urban Greek tunes from the 1920s and 1930s), French sound poet Anne James Chaton, ex bass player from Dog Faced Hermans Colin Mclean, who now works with electronic music and live sampling, Brooklyn-based DJ, producer and writer DJ /rupture, and Lebanese Paris-based saxophonist Christine Abdelnour.

Moor has also begun composing soundtracks for films, working former Dog Faced Hermans vocalist-turned filmmaker Marion Coutts, with Iranian filmmaker Bani Khoshnoudi and US experimental filmmaker Jem Cohen. His latest projects include a quartet with Ken Vandermark, Terrie Ex and Paal Nilssen-Love called Lean Left, a trio with Berlin-based artists and musician Alva Noto and Anne James Chaton called Decade, and a trio project with Anne James Chaton and Thurston Moore called Heretics. In 2013 he began a duo project with John Butcher. Moor lives in Amsterdam at present and continues to be a full-time member of the Ex. He is a founding member of the music label Unsounds, in Amsterdam, with Yannis Kyriakides and Isabelle Vigier.

== Discography ==
- Locks (2001, CD, with Kaffe Matthews, Unsounds)
- Thermal (2001, CD, with John Butcher/Thomas Lehn, Unsounds)
- Red V Green (2004, CD, with Yannis Kyriakides, Unsounds)
- Live in France (2007, CD-R, with DJ /rupture)
- Marker (2007, CD, solo, Unsounds)
- Patches (2008, CD, with DJ /rupture, Unsuitable Records)
- Everything But the Beginning (2009, CD, with Colin Mclean, Unsounds)
- Le Journaliste (2009, CD, with Anne James Chaton, Unsounds)
- Rebetika (2010, CD, with Yannis Kyriakides, Unsounds)
- Folia (2010, CD, with Yannis Kyriakides, Unsounds)
- Lean Left (2010, CD, with Terrie Ex, Ken Vandermark, Paal Nilssen-Love, live at Bimhuis Vol. 1&2, Smalltwon Superjazz)
- Guitargument (2010, CD, with Mia Clarke, hellosQuare Recordings)
- Décade (2012, CD, Album, Ltd, Book, with Anne-James Chaton and Alva Noto, Raster-Noton)
- Lean Left Live at Café Oto (2012, CD, with guests, Unsounds)
- Transfer (2012, CD, with Anne James Chaton, Unsounds)
- Lean Left Live at Area Sismica (2013, CD, Unsounds)
- A Life is A Billion Heartbeats (2014, with Yannis Kyriakides, Unsounds)
- Experiments with A Leaf (2015, with John Butcher, Unsounds)
- Raft – Hope lies Constant in the Mouth (2015, download only, with Steve Heather, Clayton Thomas and Sofia Jernberg, Unsounds)
- Futuro Ancestrale (2024, CD, with Giuseppe Doronzo and Frank Rosaly, Clean Feed)

=== Singles ===
- Transfer 1 Departures (22U) (2011, 7-inch, with Anne James Chaton, Unsounds)
- Transfer 2 Princess in Car (23U) (2011, 7-inch, with Anne James Chaton, Unsounds)
- Transfer 3 Flying Machines (24U) (2012, 7-inch, with Anne James Chaton, Unsounds)
- Transfer 4 Inbound/Outbound (36U) (2013, 7-inch, with Anne James Chaton, Unsounds)

=== Film Soundtracks ===
- Epic (2000, Marion Coutts, short film)
- No Evil Star (2003, Marion Coutts, short film)
- Transit (2004, Banafsheh Khoshnoudi with Yannis Kyriakides, short film)
- Blessed Are the Dreams of Men (2005, Jem Cohen, short film)
- Moving Pictures (2007, Jem Cohen, four 1-minute films)
- Why No Colour? (2007, Jem Cohen with Mia Clarke)
- People of The Shadows (2008, Banafsheh Khoshnoudi with Yannis Kyriakides, documentary)
- Kiba (2012, Banafsheh Khoshnoudi with Yannis Kyriakides)
- Sud Eau Nord Deplacer (2015, Antoine Boutet with Yannis Kyriakides)
