= The Ex (band) =

Dutch band

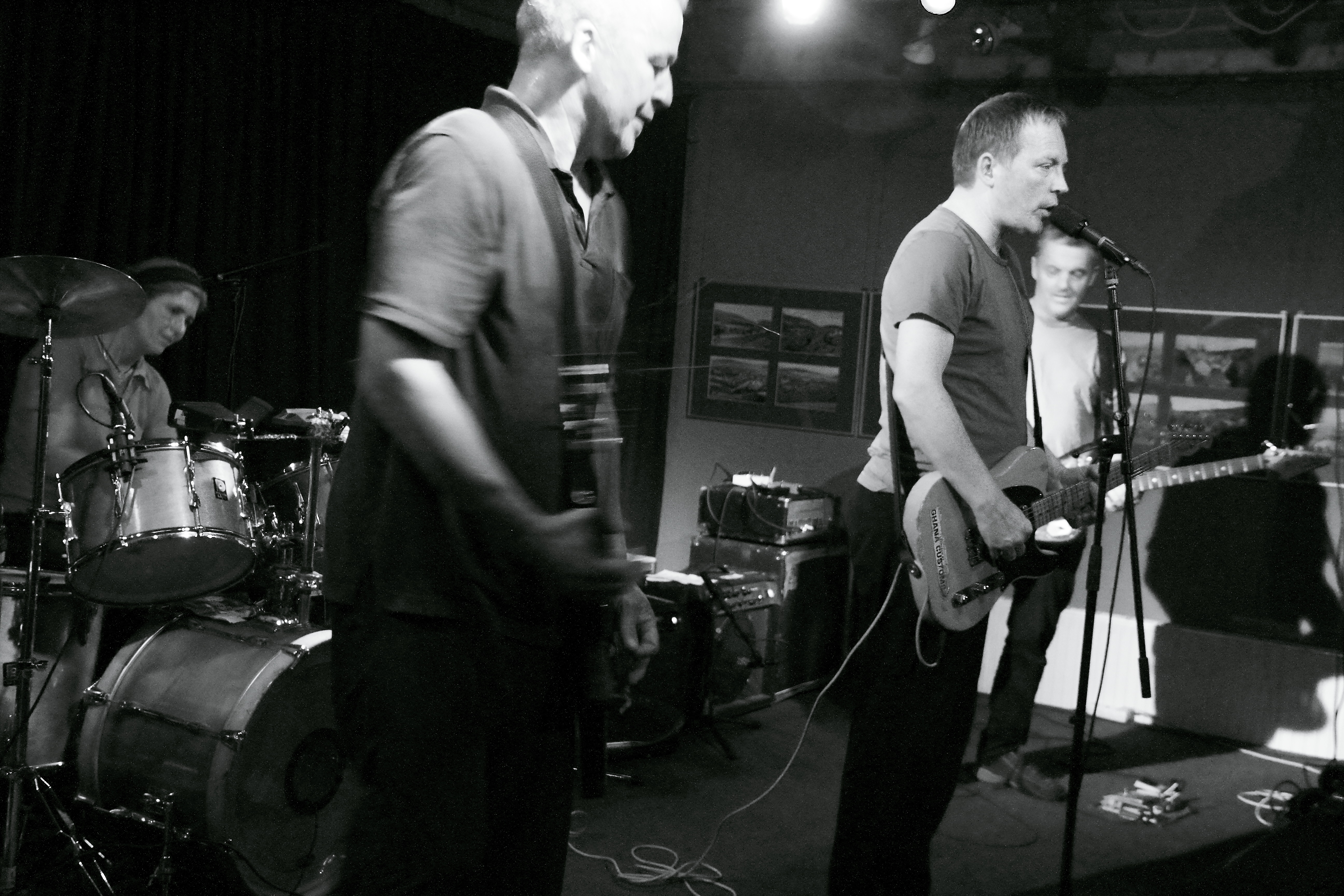
- The Ex in concert in September 2016 in Germany. Left to right: Katherina Bornefeld, Terrie Hessels, Arnold de Boer, Andy Moor.

Background information
- Origin: Amsterdam, Netherlands
- Genres: Punk rock; anarcho-punk; punk jazz; post-punk
- Years active: 1979–present
- Labels: Ex, Touch and Go
- Members: Terrie Hessels / Terrie Ex; Katherina Bornefeld; Andy Moor; Arnold de Boer
- Past members: See "Band members"
- Website: www.theex.nl

The Ex is an underground band from the Netherlands, started in 1979 at the height of the original punk explosion as a Dutch punk band. The Ex originated from the squatting movement in Amsterdam and Wormer, and was inspired by bands like The Fall and The Mekons.

Although initially known as an anarcho-punk band associated with the Dutch post-punk ultra scene, over the decades the Ex's sound has gradually developed into its current form of highly intricate, experimental punk/post-punk/no wave-inspired work. This sound includes a combination of diverse genres and styles, such as noise, folk, world music (including folk music from Hungary, Turkey, Ethiopia, Congo, and Eritrea), free jazz, and crossovers between these genres. Other examples of branching out stylistically include the improvised double album Instant and a release under the moniker Ex Orkest, a 20 piece big band assembled for performances at Holland Festival. "One reason we are hard to describe is that we never had an education at music school, and in that sense we are not influenced by any traditional playing," explained Katherina Bornefeld, drummer for the Ex since 1984. The Ex's lyrics consist of straightforward statements about politics and abuses in society. The band enjoys international acclaim for this socially critical message, as well as for the energetic, rhythmic, atonal guitar playing, and for the furious vocals of singer G.W. Sok, who was replaced in 2009 by Arnold de Boer of Zea. The Ex have released over 20 full-length albums.

== History ==
=== The 1980s ===
In 1979, the Ex was founded by singer Jos Kley (better known as G.W. Sok), guitarist Terrie Hessels, drummer Geurt, and bassist René. During the first six months that the Ex existed, they spent most of their time and effort on graffiti advertising. The band's name was chosen because it was the shortest name on their list, and that made it easy to spray quickly on a wall. Rumours circulated that the choice of what instruments the band members played was drawn by straws.

The band debuted with a song titled "Stupid Americans" on the Utreg-Punx vinyl 7" compilation released by Rock Against records in Rotterdam. In June 1980, the Ex released their first EP, All Corpses Smell the Same. The most striking features of the music are the strongly rhythmic guitar attacks and the dogged way in which Sok spit the words into the microphone. The lyrics deal with politics, squatting, and social injustice. The band's first full-length album, Disturbing Domestic Peace, was released later the same year. Shortly after these recording were released, Geurt left the band and was replaced by Willem from the Rondos. René left the band and was replaced by Bas on the bass.

In 1982, the Ex released their second album, History is What's Happening; this album is seen as a musical evolution. Many of the songs were created during live performances. Two tracks by the Ex were included on the compilation album Oorwormer. In 1982, Willem left the band and was replaced by Sabien on the drums.

In April 1983, the Ex released their second album, Tumult, produced by Jon Langford of the Mekons. A few months later, their 12 inch Gonna Rob The Spermbank was also released; this record contained four songs that were also recorded during the recording session of Tumult. In 1983, the Ex also released the album Dignity Of Labor, which appeared as a box containing four 7" singles and a book. The singles each contained eight untitled tracks that deal with the demise of the Wormer-based Van Gelder paper factory. Bas left the band and was replaced by the new bassists Luc and Joke. In the fall of 1983, the Ex did their first tour of England. A product of this tour is the split 12" The Red Dance Package that the Ex released in collaboration with the band Alerta.

During this period, the Ex consisted of five band members: G.W. Sok, Terrie (guitar), Sabien (drums), nl:Luc Ex (bass), and Joke (bass). Band members did not use surnames, often adopting "Ex" as their last name. This line-up released the double album Blueprints For A Blackout in March 1984. This album included more improvisation, and new musical instruments were used, including violin, oboe, marimba, and oil barrels. Later the same year the band changed drummers: Sabien was replaced by Kat on drums. Throughout the year, the Ex organised a benefit tour in the Netherlands together with Morzelpronk, Zowiso, and agitprop poet Nico van Apeldoorn. The Ex also toured Switzerland together with the Dutch punk band Svätsox.

In 1985, the Ex released the album Pokkeherrie, a return to the band's earlier sound, largely dominated by Terrie's guitar. Joke also left the band in 1985. From the tour through Switzerland the previous year, the Ex released a split cassette with Svätsox. The Ex also toured Switzerland again, with bands If and Zowiso.

In 1986, John van de Weert, former singer and guitarist of the Rondos briefly joined the Ex, and together they recorded the double single 1936: The Spanish Revolution. The double single contained Spanish folk songs, and was accompanied by a photo book. The single was a commercial success, especially in England, where it was distributed on Ron Johnson Records. The Ex rounded out the year by touring with the British group The Membranes.

In 1987, The Ex released their sixth album Too Many Cowboys, which consisted partly of live material. A flexi disc containing the song "Wie Vermoordde Hans K.?" by Nico van Apeldoorn accompanied the album. That same year the band teamed up with the English punk band Chumbawamba under the name Antidote to record the single Antidote de Destroy Fascism! which is released on Loony Tunes Records. The Ex also did an extensive tour of Eastern Europe, including Poland, Czechoslovakia and Hungary. They recorded a concert in Wroclaw, Poland and release it on cassette.

In 1988, John left the band, and was replaced by guitarist Nicolette. The Ex also founded the record label Ex Records. This label released the album Hands Up! You're Free, a collection of songs recorded during the Peel Sessions in 1983, 1985 and 1986. The Ex also recorded Aural Guerrilla, produced by Langford, and released the single "Rara-rap", an indictment of apartheid. They provided some songs for the sampler Intifada, to support the struggle of the Palestinians. In 1988, the Ex toured England, then Italy (with Chumbawamba), and Greece and Hungary.

In 1989, the Ex toured the Netherlands and Switzerland with the Scottish band Dog Faced Hermans. As a consequence, DFH's drummer Wilf Plum collaborated on recordings for the Ex's next recording, the double album Joggers & Smoggers released later in November of the same year. This album is more experimental and jazzy, and features many guest musicians, including members of Sonic Youth and Ab Baars. The Ex performed this album live at the Dissonanten festival in Rotterdam. Nicolette left the band at this point. In October, the Ex launched their first American tour with the Canadian band NoMeansNo; they performed twice in CBGBs, and recordings of those shows were later broadcast by IKON.

=== The 1990s ===
Tom Cora performing with the Ex.

In 1990 the Ex collaborated with The Mekons on the English record label Clawfist. A collaboration also began with the experimental cellist Tom Cora.

In 1991, the Ex started their singles project. They offered a subscription where subscribers paid 36 guilders to receive a new single every two months for a year. Each single contained four songs recorded during a performance at the Bimhuis in Amsterdam, where the Ex was supported by guest musicians Ab Baars, Han Bennink, and Wolter Wierbos.

In 1991, the Ex released a new album Scrabbling at the Lock, a collaboration with Tom Cora. This album became the group's best-selling record to date, with the underground hit song State of Shock. Andy, guitarist in the band Dog Faced Hermans, joined the Ex during this period. At the beginning of January 1992 the band received the BV Popprijs '91 at Noorderslag.

In 1993, the Ex and Tom Cora teamed up again to produce the album And the Weathermen Shrug Their Shoulders. The following year, the band began a series of performances under the title It's All Too Beautiful, where music and dance go against each other. During the performances the band was supported by Joop van Brakel and a dance troupe led by choreographer Wim Kannekens. This performance series continued until 1995.

In 1995 the vocal artist Han Buhrs became a member of the Ex, and together they recorded the album Mudbird Shivers. The arrival of Buhrs inspired the band to also incorporate blues influences into their music. The band Dog Faced Hermans disbanded in 1994, after which Andy permanently joined the Ex. In this formation, the band recorded the double album Instant.

In 1995 the Ex put on a party in Paradiso, under the name Plezante Affair. After this party it became quieter around the band for a few years. Band members took on other musical projects. Some members worked together with the klezmerband Kletka Red and with the dance company Magpie. Buhrs left the band in early 1997. That same year, G.W. Sok released Ex-Rated, a songbook of his lyrics.

In 1998 in the United States, the Ex teamed up with producer Steve Albini for the album Starters Alternators. In 1999 they recorded a mini-album with Tortoise in the United States. In May 1999 the band celebrated its twentieth anniversary in at the Paradiso in Amsterdam, where they played together with De Kift and Shellac, among others.

The Ex's 1999 album In the Fishtank 5 was a collaboration with the Chicago-based band Tortoise.

=== The 2000s ===
The Ex are too weird and difficult to get a soundbyte handle on. They are the “We Are the World” punks and that’s just not very cool. They tour Africa every year and engage in workshops with local musicians and children. They champion a rotating set of collaborators, often willingly taking on the role of glorified backing band for their passion projects with acts as varied as Sonic Youth, the Mekons, and Chumbawamba. They are ostensibly a punk band but rarely manage to play a song that is under five minutes long. They are smiley, friendly, engaging middle-aged folks, former squatters from Amsterdam who took a liking to free jazz and folk and yes, even the unstylish rhythms of “world music”. Take all of that into consideration and it's easy to see why they have no place in your average music critics' narrative. They aren't outlaws. They're painters.

— Alex Siquig, Popmatters

In June 2000, the Ex performed at the Holland Festival, where they collaborated with a twenty-piece big band. Columnist Jan Mulder and conductor Hamisch McKeich contributed to this performance, among many others. Guitarist Terrie also released two improvised albums, one with Ab Baars and one with Han Bennink.

In 2001 the Ex's new album Dizzy Spells was produced by Steve Albini, after which the band went on tour throughout Europe and the United States. In 2001 the album In the Fishtank was released; this album was a collaboration with members of Sonic Youth and the Dutch improvisers Instant Composers Pool Orchestra (ICP).

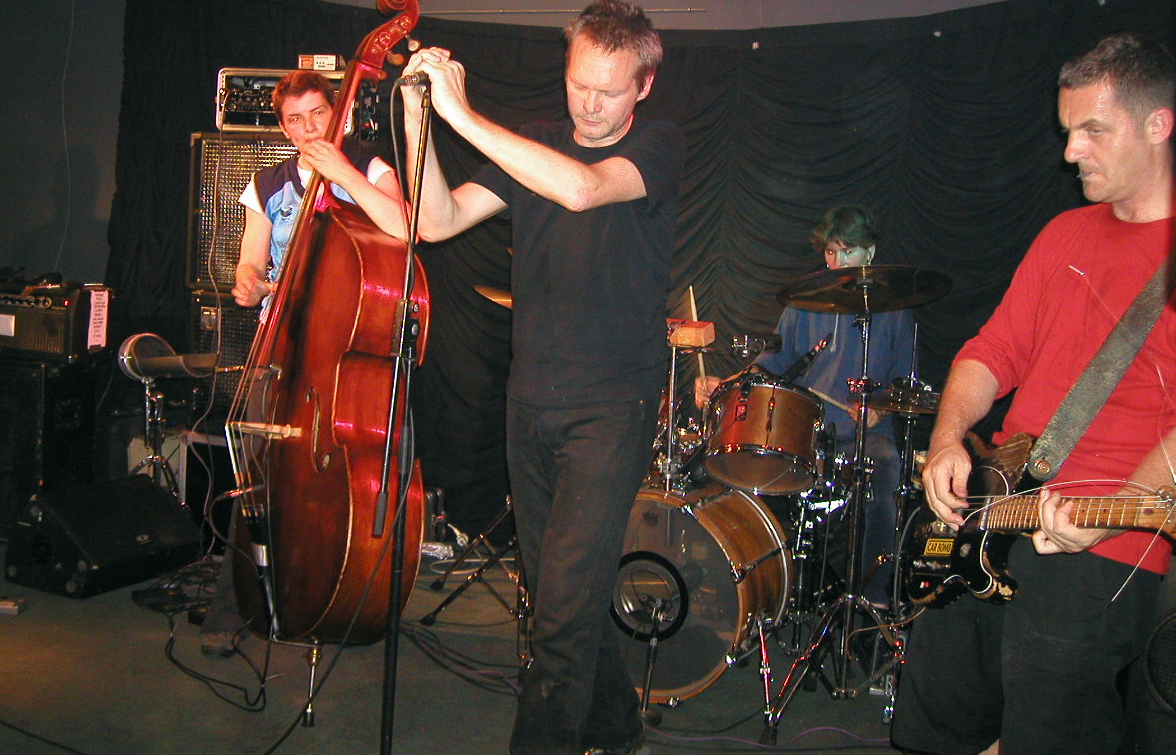
The Ex in concert on 16 June 2004 in Germany. Left to right: Rozemarie Heggen, G.W. Sok, Katherina Bornefeld, Andy Moor

In 2002, the Ex put on concerts in Ethiopia together with Han Bennink. In 2003 bass player Luc left the band, and was replaced by double bassist Rozemarie Heggen, who had played in the Koninklijk Concertgebouworkest. In 2003, the Ex brought the Congolese band "Konono Nr. 1" to Europe. The Ex went on tour again, including in Italy, Eritrea and a three-week tour of the United States. In the United States they collaborated with Steve Albini for the third time to produce the double album Turn, which was released in 2004. The Ex then toured Ethiopia for the second time.

In 2005, the band released the album In The Event together with the French sound poet Anne James Chaton, as well as the single compilation Singles.Period. In 2005 double bass player Rozemarie left the band and Colin (formerly of the Dog Faced Hermans) served as the band's bass player for recordings and tours with Ethiopian saxophone legend Getatchew Mekuria before becoming The Ex's sound board operator. Guitarists Andy Moor and Terrie Hessels have since filled in bass parts by switching off on baritone guitar.

During these years, the Ex regularly brought little-known African bands to Europe and the United States. These bands performed as an opener for concert appearances of the Ex, but often also performed together with the Ex on stage. Not only Konono Nr. 1 but also Djibril Diabaté and the Azmari's gained recognition among Western audiences in this way.

The Ex is the subject of a documentary, Beautiful Frenzy (2004) by Christina Hallström and Mandra U. Wabäck, and the concert film Building a Broken Mousetrap (2006), directed by Jem Cohen.

In 2005, the Ex performed in "A Clockwork Orange" together with theater group d'Electrique, the production core around Ko van den Bosch, in a huge ship shed in the About the IJ Festival. This performance was very well received by press and public. In May and July 2007, "A Clockwork Orange" went on a reprise and tour of theaters.

In 2008 the band was featured in the film Roll Up Your Sleeves, directed by Dylan Haskins.

In 2009, after 30 years with the group, singer and co-founder G.W. Sok announced his departure from the band. Sok did so, believing he lacked the energy to continue and wanted to concentrate more on writing and graphic design, as well as singing in new musical projects with several other bands. His replacement is Arnold de Boer from the Dutch group Zea, with whom the Ex have toured and collaborated. In addition to singing, De Boer plays guitar and utilizes samples with the Ex.

In 2010 the band performed at the Incubate festival in Tilburg, and toured later that year with, among others, the RaaskalBOMfukkerZ. In 2011 the Ex were chosen by Caribou to perform at and co-curate the All Tomorrow's Parties music festival in Minehead, England. During this period the band began to re-release earlier albums.

== Band members ==
=== Present ===
- Terrie Hessels (also known as Terrie Ex) – guitar, baritone guitar (1979–present)
- Katherina Bornefeld – drums, vocals, percussion (1984–present)
- Andy Moor – guitar, baritone guitar (1990–present)
- Arnold de Boer – vocals, guitar, samples (2009–present)

=== Former ===
- G.W. Sok – vocals (1979–2009)
- Geurt van Gisteren – drums (1979–1981)
- René de Groot – bass (1979–1980)
- Bas Masbeck – bass (1980–1983)
- Wim ter Weele – drums (1981–1982)
- Sabien Witteman – drums (1982–1984)
- Luc Klaasen – bass (1983–2002)
- Yoke Laarman – bass (1983–1985)
- Johannes van de Weert – vocals (1986–1987)
- Nicolette Schuurman – guitar (1987–1989)
- Colin McLean – bass (1993–1994, 2005, 2012)
- Han Buhrs – vocals (1995–1997)
- Han Bennink – drums (1997)
- Rozemarie Heggen – double bass (2003–2005)
- Massimo Pupillo – bass (2005)

== Discography ==
Studio albums

- Disturbing Domestic Peace (1980)
- History Is What's Happening (1982)
- Dignity of Labour (1983)
- Tumult (1983)
- Blueprints for a Blackout (1984)
- Pokkeherrie (1985)
- Too Many Cowboys (1985)
- Aural Guerrilla (1988)
- Joggers and Smoggers (1989)
- Scrabbling at the Lock (1991)
- And the Weathermen Shrug Their Shoulders (1993)
- Instant (1995)
- Mudbird Shivers (1995)
- Starters Alternators (1998)
- Dizzy Spells (2001)
- Turn (2004)
- Catch My Shoe (2011)
- 27 passports (2018)
- If Your Mirror Breaks (2025)
