= List of indie pop artists =

This is a list of notable indie pop artists. Bands are listed by the first letter in their name (not including the words "a", "an", or "the"), and individuals are listed by last name.

== 0-9 ==
- +/-
- 14 Iced Bears
- The 1975

== A ==
- A Witness
- A.R. Kane
- Aberdeen
- Aberfeldy
- Gracie Abrams
- The ACBs
- The Aces
- Acid House Kings
- Agent Sparks
- AgesandAges
- The Aislers Set
- AJR
- Aldous Harding
- Alex G
- All Girl Summer Fun Band
- Allie X
- Allo Darlin'
- Almost Monday
- Aloha
- Alt-J
- AlunaGeorge
- Alvvays
- Amber Run
- American Authors
- American Football
- Anathallo
- Andrew McMahon in the Wilderness
- Animal Liberation Orchestra
- Anjulie
- Annie
- Annuals
- Another Sunny Day
- Apostle of Hustle
- The Apples in Stereo
- Jack Antonoff
- April Lawlor
- Aqueduct
- Architecture in Helsinki
- Arlissa
- Ashnikko
- As Tall As Lions
- Astrid
- Astrud
- Au Revoir Simone
- Aude
- The Auteurs
- The Awkward Stage
- Awolnation
- Aztec Camera

== B ==
- Baby Calendar
- The Bad Spellers
- Julien Baker
- Ballboy
- Banks
- BARON.E
- Bat for Lashes
- The Bats
- Bastille
- Baustelle
- beabadoobee
- Beach House
- Beach Weather
- Beach Bunny
- Bearsuit
- Beat Crusaders
- Beat Happening
- The Beat Movement
- Beehive
- Beirut
- Bella
- Giselle Bellas
- Belle and Sebastian
- BENEE
- Brendan Benson
- Best Coast
- Beulah
- Biff Bang Pow!
- The Big Pink
- Big Thief
- Billie Eilish
- Billie the Vision and the Dancers
- The Bird and the Bee
- Birdy
- Bis
- Bishop Briggs
- Björk
- Black Belt Eagle Scout
- Black Kids
- Black Tambourine
- Emma Blackery
- Sarah Blasko
- Bleachers
- Blind Pilot
- Blitzen Trapper
- Blondfire
- Blood Orange
- Blossoms
- Blueboy
- BMX Bandits
- The Boat People
- Bôa
- Bob
- The Bohemes
- The Bolts
- Bombay Bicycle Club
- Bon Iver
- Bon Voyage
- Born Ruffians
- BØRNS
- Butterfly Boucher
- Boy Kill Boy
- The Boy Least Likely To
- Boy Pablo
- BoyWithUke
- Phoebe Bridgers
- The Brobecks
- Broder Daniel
- Broken Social Scene
- The Broken West
- Broods
- Brother Henry
- The Brother Kite
- Ian Broudie
- VV Brown
- Bo Bruce
- The Brunettes
- Jeff Buckley
- Basia Bulat
- John Butler
- Bunnygrunt
- Jaira Burns
- Kate Bush
- Butcher Boy
- ByeAlex

== C ==
- Cafuné
- Camera Obscura
- Isobel Campbell
- Cage The Elephant
- Los Campesinos!
- Capital Cities
- The Capstan Shafts
- Alessia Cara
- The Cardigans
- Casiotone for the Painfully Alone
- Casper And The Cookies
- Cat Power
- Catchers
- Caveboy
- Cavetown
- Michael Cera
- Chairlift
- The Chameleons
- Chappell Roan
- Charli XCX
- Charlz
- Chase Atlantic
- Cheer Chen
- The Chesterfields
- Chicklet
- The Chills
- Chin Up Chin Up
- Chocolate USA
- The Choir Practice
- Christine and the Queens
- Chromatics
- CHVRCHES
- Cigarettes After Sex
- Circulatory System
- City & Colour
- Clairo
- Clara La San
- Clammbon
- Clap Your Hands Say Yeah
- Allen Clapp
- The Clean
- The Clientele
- Client Liaison
- Close Lobsters
- Cloud Cult
- Club 8
- Coast Modern
- Jarvis Cocker
- Cocteau Twins
- Coeur de pirate
- Jason Collett
- Comet Gain
- The Concretes
- Copeland
- Imani Coppola
- Matt Corby
- The Corn Dollies
- Cosmo Sheldrake
- Crayon
- The Crayon Fields
- Crystal Castles
- Crocodiles
- Dan Croll
- CRUISR
- Crumb
- Cub
- Cuco
- Cults
- Current Joys
- Custard
- Cut Off Your Hands
- Coin

== D ==
- d4vd
- Lucy Dacus
- Dagny
- Danielson Famile
- Dappled Cities Fly
- The Darling Buds
- Dash and Will
- Daughter (band)
- Zella Day
- Daya
- Dayglow
- Indigo De Souza
- Dealership
- Dear and the Headlights
- Death Cab for Cutie
- The Decemberists
- Darwin Deez
- Helena Deland
- The Delgados
- Mac DeMarco
- The Dentists
- Dev
- Diamond Rings
- Neva Dinova
- The Dirty Clergy
- The Ditty Bops
- The Divine Comedy
- Dizzy
- The Dø
- Dr. Dog
- The Driver Era
- Dodie
- The Dodos
- Dog Is Dead
- Dogs Die in Hot Cars
- Doleful Lions
- Dolly Mixture
- Dolour
- Dom
- Dominic Fike
- Siobhán Donaghy
- Dotan
- Dressy Bessy
- The Drums
- Dum Dum Girls
- Dutch Uncles
- Lola Dutronic

== E ==
- East River Pipe
- Echo Orbiter
- Echosmith
- Eden
- Eisley
- Mikky Ekko
- Electrelane
- Electric Guest
- Electric President
- Elf Power
- Elizabeth & the Catapult
- Ellington
- Empire of the Sun
- The Essex Green
- Esthero
- Ethel Cain
- Even As We Speak
- Ewert and The Two Dragons
- Eyedress
- Elio Mei

== F ==
- Fanfarlo
- The Farmer's Boys
- Farrah
- Chris Farren
- Fat Tulips
- Father John Misty
- Fazerdaze
- Feist
- Felt
- Fizz
- Sam Fender
- Sky Ferreira
- The Field Mice
- Figurine
- Dominic Fike
- Final Fantasy
- A Fine Frenzy
- Liam Finn
- Fiona Apple
- Fire Through the Window
- Fire Zuave
- Fishboy
- Fitz and the Tantrums
- FKA twigs
- The Flatmates
- Flipper's Guitar
- Liana Flores
- Flor
- Flora Cash
- Florence and the Machine
- The Format
- Foster the People
- Fountains of Wayne
- Dia Frampton
- Max Frost
- Fred
- Free Energy
- Freezepop
- Friends
- Ruby Frost
- Frou Frou
- Fun
- Misia Furtak

== G ==
- Galileo Galilei
- Gang of Youths
- Garden City Movement
- Chris Garneau
- Orla Gartland
- Generationals
- Gentleman Reg
- Gentlemen Hall
- The Gentle Waves
- Geographer
- Hannah Georgas
- The Gerbils
- Gesu no Kiwami Otome
- girl in red
- Girls
- Girlyboi
- Giselle Bellas
- Givers
- Glass Animals
- The Gloria Record
- The Go-Betweens
- Go Sailor
- Gold Motel
- The Good Life
- Good Shoes
- Gorillaz
- Gotye
- Conan Gray
- Great Aunt Ida
- A Great Big World
- Great Lake Swimmers
- Great Lakes
- The Grenadiers
- Grimes
- Grizzly Bear
- Grouplove
- El Guincho
- Gym Class Heroes
- Gypsy and the Cat

== H ==
- HAIM
- Emily Haines
- Luke Haines
- Half Alive
- Half-Handed Cloud
- Half Man Half Biscuit
- Halsey
- Hanson
- The Happy Bullets
- Have a Nice Life
- Maya Hawke
- Hayden
- He Is We
- Headlights
- Imogen Heap
- Heavenly
- Helicopter Girl
- The Helio Sequence
- Hello Saferide
- Hellogoodbye
- Håkan Hellström
- Her's
- Hey Ocean!
- Haley Heynderickx
- Hidden Cameras
- Hidrogenesse
- Missy Higgins
- The High Water Marks
- Marian Hill
- Nanna Bryndís Hilmarsdóttir
- Hippo Campus
- Hoax
- Holiday Flyer
- The Honey Buzzards
- An Horse
- The House of Love
- The Housemartins
- Holly Humberstone
- Hungry Kids of Hungary
- Hurray for the Riff Raff
- The Hush Sound
- Dev Hynes

== I ==
- I Dont Know How but They Found Me
- Il Genio
- I'm from Barcelona
- Immaculate Machine
- Imperial Teen
- Inhaler
- Island of Love
- Islands
- It's Immaterial
- Ivan & Alyosha
- Ivy

== J ==
- Jakob (formerly Jakob Ogawa)
- Georgie James
- Jarryd James
- Japancakes
- Japanese Breakfast
- The Japanese House
- JAWS
- The Jesus and Mary Chain
- Jets Overhead
- Jets to Brazil
- Janani K. Jha
- Jinja Safari
- Joan of Arc
- Jocelyn & Lisa
- Johnny Boy
- Joy Again
- Joy Division
- Joji
- Jaimin Rajani
- Vance Joy
- Julia Jacklin
- The June Brides
- The Jungle Giants

== K ==
- Kakkmaddafakka
- Kali Uchis
- Karkwa
- Georgi Kay
- Kay Kay and His Weathered Underground
- Kerli
- Kero Kero Bonito
- Khalid
- Kiiara
- Kid Canaveral
- Kimbra
- Kina
- Elle King
- King Gnu
- King Princess
- Kings of Convenience
- Sarah Kinsley
- Kitten
- Hayley Kiyoko
- Komeda
- The Kooks
- Mela Koteluk
- Koufax
- Ben Kweller

== L ==
- Kyla La Grange
- Ladybug Transistor
- Ladyhawke
- Ladytron
- Lana Del Rey
- LANY
- The La's
- Isabel LaRosa
- Last Dinosaurs
- The Last Dinner Party
- The Last Shadow Puppets
- The Layaways
- Ben Lee
- Left at London
- Erin LeCount
- Jens Lekman
- Jade LeMac
- Lenka
- Adrianne Lenker
- Don Lennon
- Sondre Lerche
- Let's Go Sailing
- Lykke Li
- Library Voices
- Lights
- Lightspeed Champion
- The Like
- The Limousines
- Liana Flores
- Maggie Lindemann
- Liquid Blue
- The Little Ones
- Dennis Lloyd
- LP
- Local Natives
- The Lodger
- The Loft
- Lois
- Loney, Dear
- The Long Winters
- Look Blue Go Purple
- Look See Proof
- Mary Lou Lord
- Lorde
- The Lotus Eaters
- Emma Louise
- Love Is All
- The Love Language
- Lovejoy
- The Lovely Feathers
- The Lovely Sparrows
- Lovelytheband
- LoveLikeFire
- The Lucksmiths
- Lucky Soul
- Lullatone
- The Lumineers
- Lush
- Luzer
- Lydia
- Lydia Ainsworth

== M ==
- M83
- Mae
- Magdalena Bay
- MagellanMusic
- Magneta Lane
- The Magnetic Fields
- The Main Drag
- Majical Cloudz
- Malajube
- Maow
- Marbles
- Marc with a C
- April March
- The Margarets
- Ida Maria
- The Marías
- Marina and the Diamonds
- Marine Girls
- Marine Research
- Helen Marnie
- Briston Maroney
- Johnny Marr
- Mars Argo
- Maritime
- Erin Martin
- Melanie Martinez
- Billie Marten
- James Marriott
- Mates of State
- Math and Physics Club
- Matt and Kim
- Matt Maltese
- Mazzy Star
- Lizzy McAlpine
- McCarthy
- Nellie McKay
- Declan McKenna
- Mean Red Spiders
- MeeK
- Meg and Dia
- Mega Gem
- Meiko
- Rose Melberg
- Memphis
- Men I Trust
- James Mercer
- Metric
- Metronomy
- MGMT
- Michael Angelakos
- Julia Michaels
- Ingrid Michaelson
- Malcolm Middleton
- Malcolm Todd
- Mighty Mighty
- Mild High Club
- Amy Millan
- Tor Miller
- Minipop
- Miniature Tigers
- Mirah
- Mira Aroyo
- MisterWives
- Lisa Mitchell
- Mitski
- MØ
- Modest Mouse
- Victoria Monét
- Monkey Swallows the Universe
- The Monochrome Set
- The Mood
- Kailee Morgue
- Chloe Moriondo
- Morrissey
- Moscow Olympics
- The Most Serene Republic
- Mother Mother
- The Motorcycle Boy
- The Mowgli's
- Mrs. Green Apple
- MS MR
- MUNA
- Stuart Murdoch
- Mxmtoon
- my little airport
- My Teenage Stride
- Myracle Brah

== N ==
- Nada Surf
- The Naked and Famous
- Kate Nash
- The National
- The Neighbourhood
- Neon Indian
- Neon Trees
- Neutral Milk Hotel
- New Buffalo
- The New Electric Sound
- The New Pornographers
- New West
- New Young Pony Club
- A.C. Newman
- Nightmare of You
- Noah and the Whale
- Noemi
- Jim Noir
- The Notwist
- Novillero
- Now It's Overhead

== O ==
- Oberhofer
- Conor Oberst
- The Ocean Blue
- Tom Odell
- of Montreal
- Of Monsters and Men
- Oh Honey
- Oh Land
- Oh Wonder
- Ohbijou
- Okay Kaya
- The Olivia Tremor Control
- Angel Olsen
- One Night Only
- Oppenheimer
- Orange Juice
- The Orchids
- The Organ
- Oh Wonder
- Owl City
- Owl Eyes

== P ==
- The Pains of Being Pure at Heart
- Pale Saints
- Pale Waves
- Owen Pallett
- Paris Paloma
- Papas Fritas
- Papercuts
- Paperplane Pursuit
- Paper Route
- PAS/CAL
- Passenger
- Passion Pit
- The Pastels
- Pavement
- Peachcake
- Peach Pit
- Pedro The Lion
- Perfume Genius
- Pernice Brothers
- Peter, Bjorn and John
- Kim Petras
- Phantom Planet
- Phoenix
- Phox
- The Pillbugs
- PinkPantheress
- The Pipettes
- Pizzicato Five
- Los Planetas
- Playradioplay!
- Dawid Podsiadło
- Pogo
- Caroline Polachek
- Emma Pollock
- Polnalyubvi
- Pomplamoose
- Pony Club
- Pony Up!
- Porter Robinson
- The Pooh Sticks
- The Popguns
- The Postal Service
- The Postmarks
- Prep
- Primal Scream
- The Primary 5
- The Primitives
- The Promise Ring
- Puffy AmiYumi
- Purity Ring
- PVRIS

== R ==
- Ra Ra Riot
- RadaR Rock Band
- The Radio Dept.
- The Rain
- Razorcuts
- The Regrettes
- The Remains of Brian Borcherdt
- Res
- Reverie Sound Revue
- Rex Orange County
- Bebe Rexha
- Lana Del Rey
- Damien Rice
- Rilo Kiley
- Roadside Poppies
- Sizzy Rocket
- Rocketship
- The Rocketboys
- Maggie Rogers
- Rogue Wave
- Caroline Rose
- Katy Rose
- The Rosebuds
- Leith Ross
- Emmy Rossum
- The Ruby Suns
- Nate Ruess
- The Russian Futurists
- Phoebe Ryan
- Roar
- Royel Otis

== S ==
- Sad Day for Puppets
- Sombr
- Samia
- St. Christopher
- Saint Etienne
- St. Lucia
- Saint Motel
- Saint Raymond
- St. Vincent
- SALES
- Sambassadeur
- San Cisco
- Sandy
- Santigold
- Sarah P.
- Satellite Stories
- Saturday Looks Good to Me
- Alexandra Savior
- Bryan Scary
- The Scene Aesthetic
- The School
- Scouting for Girls
- Seapony
- Seabear
- Sea Girls
- The Sea Urchins
- Sekai no Owari
- The Servants
- Seventeen Evergreen
- Sex Clark Five
- Amy Shark
- She & Him
- Sheppard
- Shonen Knife
- Shop Assistants
- Shout Out Louds
- The Shins
- Shy Boys
- The Siddeleys
- The Silly Pillows
- Sing Sing
- Sir Chloe
- Yo Yo Honey Singh
- Sissy Bar
- Troye Sivan
- Sleepy Township
- Slow Pulp
- Small Factory
- Smallpools
- Dan Smith
- Elliott Smith
- The Smiths
- Smoosh
- Smudge
- Snail Mail
- The Sneetches
- Miike Snow
- Soccer Mommy
- Social Repose
- Sodagreen
- Sofia Isella
- The Softies
- SoKo
- Someone Still Loves You Boris Yeltsin
- Juan Son
- The Sounds
- The Soup Dragons
- South San Gabriel
- Spectacle
- Regina Spektor
- Starflyer 59
- Starlight Mints
- Stars
- Statistics
- Jack Stauber
- Stepdad
- Steve Lacy
- Stereolab
- Still Corners
- Still Life Still
- The Stills
- Angus and Julia Stone
- STRFKR
- Strawberry Guy
- The Submarines
- Suburban Kids With Biblical Names
- Sufjan Stevens
- The Sugarcubes
- Suki Waterhouse
- Summer Hymns
- Sun Kil Moon
- The Sundays
- Supercute!
- Superorganism
- Sweet Trip
- Swim Deep
- Swimclub
- Sylvan Esso

== T ==
- Tahiti 80
- Tally Hall
- Talulah Gosh
- Tame Impala
- The Tartans
- Maria Taylor
- Team Me
- Teenage Fanclub
- Tegan and Sara
- Tei Shi
- Teleman
- Television Personalities
- Alfie Templeman
- Chloe Temtchine
- Tender Trap
- Tennis
- Terror Jr
- This Is Ivy League
- This Providence
- Thomas Tantrum
- The Marías
- The Walters
- Charlie Thorpe
- Those Dancing Days
- Thriving Ivory
- Throw Me the Statue
- Tiga
- Tiger Trap
- Tilly and the Wall
- Tim & Jean
- Times New Viking
- Tinashe
- The Ting Tings
- Tinted Windows
- Tiny Dancers
- Tokyo Police Club
- Toro Y Moi
- Emilíana Torrini
- Tove Lo
- The Trash Can Sinatras
- Travis
- Trembling Blue Stars
- Trixie's Big Red Motorbike
- The Trolleyvox
- Tullycraft
- TV Girl
- Twenty One Pilots
- Twin Shadow
- Two Door Cinema Club
- Two Spot Gobi

== U ==
- Ugly Casanova
- The Unicorns
- Unknown Mortal Orchestra
- Urban Cone

== V ==
- Vampire Weekend
- Sharon Van Etten
- Andrew VanWyngarden
- The Vaselines
- Valley
- Velocity Girl
- Velvet Crush
- Veronica Falls
- Via Audio
- Viola Beach
- Tessa Violet
- La Vida Bohème
- Vinyl Theatre
- The Virgins
- Vivian Girls
- Voxtrot
- Vundabar

== W ==
- Rufus Wainwright
- Will Wood
- Walk the Moon
- Tom Walker
- Chris Walla
- Wallows
- The Walters
- Jessie Ware
- Washed Out
- Suki Waterhouse
- Wavves
- Waxahatchee
- Gerard Way
- We Are Scientists
- We Were Promised Jetpacks
- A Weather
- The Weather Prophets
- Ryn Weaver
- The Webb Brothers
- Faye Webster
- The Wedding Present
- The Weeknd
- The Weepies
- John-Allison Weiss
- Florence Welch
- Weyes Blood
- What Made Milwaukee Famous
- Brooke White
- White Rabbits
- The Whitest Boy Alive
- The Whitlams
- Wild Child
- Wild Nothing
- Wildlife Control
- Wolf Alice
- Remi Wolf
- The Wombats
- World Domination Enterprises
- Would-Be-Goods
- Bill Wurtz

== X ==
- The xx

== Y ==
- Yeasayer
- Yeah Yeah Yeahs
- Yo La Tengo
- Yours Are the Only Ears
- Yot Club
- You Say Party
- Lola Young
- Young and Sexy
- Young Galaxy
- Young the Giant
- Youngblood Hawke
- Yuna
- Yungblud

== Z ==
- Zero 7

== See also ==
- List of indie rock artists
- List of alternative rock artists
