= Scared to Get Happy: A Story of Indie-Pop 1980–1989 =

Compilation album by Various
- Released: June 24, 2013
- Genre: Indie pop
- Length: 395:31
- Label: Cherry Red

Professional ratings
Review scores
Source	Rating
AllMusic	3.5/5 stars
The Guardian	3/5 stars

Scared to Get Happy: A Story of Indie-Pop 1980–1989 is a five-disc compilation album that features 134 songs from indie pop artists from the 1980s. It was released in June 2013 by Cherry Red Records.

Cherry Red Records explained the album is inspired by Lenny Kaye's album Nuggets: Original Artyfacts from the First Psychedelic Era, 1965–1968.

== Track listing ==
Disc One
No.	Title	Artist	Length
1.	"Revolutionary Spirit"	The Wild Swans	4:24
2.	"Getting Nowhere Fast"	Girls at Our Best!	2:02
3.	"Showing Off to Impress the Girls"	Art Objects	2:44
4.	"(There's Always) Something on My Mind"	Pale Fountains	2:41
5.	"The Missionary"	Josef K	3:47
6.	"The Jet Set Junta"	The Monochrome Set	2:03
7.	"Dumb Magician"	The Blue Orchids	2:55
8.	"Don't Come Back"	Marine Girls	2:03
9.	"Candy Skin"	The Fire Engines	2:54
10.	"Ambition"	TV21	3:59
11.	"Everything and More"	Dolly Mixture	2:56
12.	"Paraffin Brain"	The Nightingales	3:02
13.	"All About You"	Scars	4:02
14.	"It's a Fine Day"	Jane	2:46
15.	"I Think I Need Help"	The Farmer's Boys	2:17
16.	"Things Have Learnt to Walk That Ought to Crawl"	The Room	3:37
17.	"Summerdays"	Weekend	2:52
18.	"Lions in My Own Garden (Exit Someone)"	Prefab Sprout	2:36
19.	"Nerve Pylon"	The Lines	3:46
20.	"Feeling Dizzy"	Everything but the Girl	4:16
21.	"The Lost and the Lonely"	The Higsons	3:01
22.	"Human Features"	Black	3:06
23.	"Roll On Summertime"	The Daintees	3:18
24.	"Happy Birthday"	The Bluebells	2:57
25.	"Norman and Narcissus"	Trixie's Big Red Motorbike	2:31
26.	"A Picture of Dorian Gray"	Television Personalities	2:43

Disc Two
No.	Title	Artist	Length
1.	"The Sun Shines Here"	Hurrah!	2:27
2.	"If She Doesn't Smile (It'll Rain)"	Fantastic Something	3:13
3.	"Everybody's Problem"	Pulp	3:15
4.	"Dark 7"	Strawberry Switchblade	3:03
5.	"Stop the Rain"	Suede Crocodiles	3:24
6.	"I'm Used Now"	Grab Grab the Haddock	2:24
7.	"Sense Sickness"	Del Amitri	2:51
8.	"Honey at the Core"	Friends Again	3:55
9.	"Oblivious"	Aztec Camera	3:11
10.	"Are You Ready to Be Heartbroken?"	Lloyd Cole and the Commotions	2:09
11.	"Kardomah Cafe"	The Cherry Boys	3:15
12.	"This Brilliant Evening"	In Embrace	2:48
13.	"Dolly"	Microdisney	3:20
14.	"Plenty"	The Woodentops	3:17
15.	"Southern Mark Smith"	The Jazz Butcher	3:32
16.	"Where the Traffic Goes"	The Jasmine Minks	2:32
17.	"Forever"	The Hit Parade	2:56
18.	"Every Conversation"	June Brides	3:07
19.	"In the Afternoon"	Revolving Paint Dream	3:25
20.	"Hymn from a Village"	James	2:52
21.	"Just Like Honey"	The Jesus and Mary Chain	2:56
22.	"The Chocolate Elephant Man"	Biff Bang Pow!	3:08
23.	"Temple of Convenience"	Yeah Yeah Noh	2:46
24.	"God Bless"	The Bodines	2:18
25.	"Debra"	Big Flame	2:09
26.	"Up the Hill and Down the Slope"	The Loft	4:16

Disc Three
No.	Title	Artist	Length
1.	"Velocity Girl"	Primal Scream	1:24
2.	"Go Out and Get 'Em, Boy!"	The Wedding Present	4:11
3.	"Thru the Flowers"	The Primitives	2:27
4.	"Sad?"	BMX Bandits	3:00
5.	"All Day Long"	Shop Assistants	1:50
6.	"Something Happens"	The Mighty Lemon Drops	3:40
7.	"X X Sex (demo)"	We've Got a Fuzzbox and We're Gonna Use It	1:59
8.	"Is There Anyone Out There?"	Mighty Mighty	3:41
9.	"Quite Content"	The Soup Dragons	2:36
10.	"Red Sleeping Beauty"	McCarthy	3:40
11.	"Motorcity"	Age of Chance	3:32
12.	"Completely & Utterly"	The Chesterfields	2:05
13.	"Cut the Cake"	The Wolfhounds	3:24
14.	"Loggerheads"	The Servants	3:09
15.	"Don't Worry (Demo)"	Close Lobsters	2:48
16.	"Sick Little Girl"	Pop Will Eat Itself	2:31
17.	"Big Pink Cake"	Razorcuts	3:25
18.	"It's a Good Thing"	That Petrol Emotion	2:34
19.	"Almost Prayed"	The Weather Prophets	2:39
20.	"Vote for Love"	Jamie Wednesday	3:29
21.	"Beatnik Boy"	Talulah Gosh	1:51
22.	"She Dazzled Me with Basil"	The Dentists	2:46
23.	"A Gentle Sound"	Railway Children	3:16
24.	"Baby Blue Marine (Alternative Version)"	The Groove Farm	1:47
25.	"The Rain Fell Down"	Jesse Garon and the Desperadoes	3:16
26.	"(Whatever Happened to) Alice?"	Rosemary's Children	3:33
27.	"Balloon Song"	14 Iced Bears	2:31
28.	"A Wonderful Day"	The Wonder Stuff	1:55

Disc Four
No.	Title	Artist	Length
1.	"Shine On"	The House of Love	3:20
2.	"Something About You"	The Shamen	2:58
3.	"The Albums of Jack"	The Bachelor Pad	2:26
4.	"Albert Parker"	Gol Gappas	4:09
5.	"Love Is Blue"	Hangman's Beautiful Daughters	3:36
6.	"Heaven Forbid"	Whirl	3:07
7.	"Delilah Sands"	Brilliant Corners	3:08
8.	"Shimmer"	The Flatmates	3:40
9.	"Gruesome Castle"	The Wake	3:18
10.	"Engine Failure"	This Poison!	1:36
11.	"If I Said"	The Darling Buds	2:57
12.	"Tidalwave"	Boy Hairdressers	1:47
13.	"She Looks Right Through Me"	The Waltones	3:30
14.	"Room in Your Heart"	The Rosehips	2:15
15.	"Love Resistance"	Apple Boutique	3:59
16.	"Take Your Time Yeah!"	Laugh	2:45
17.	"She's a Nurse but She's Alright"	The Raw Herbs	3:53
18.	"Toy"	The Heart Throbs	3:36
19.	"Tranquil"	The Clouds	2:59
20.	"You Make My Head Explode"	The Groovy Little Numbers	2:22
21.	"My Favourite Wet Wednesday Afternoon"	The Siddeleys	3:31
22.	"Tug-Boat Line"	Rumblefish	3:30
23.	"The World Is"	The Hepburns	2:04
24.	"One of Those Things"	Bubblegum Splash	2:04
25.	"Be Small Again"	The Corn Dollies	2:45
26.	"Lee Remick"	The King of Luxembourg	2:22
27.	"Son of a Gun (demo)"	The La's	1:56

Disc Five
No.	Title	Artist	Length
1.	"The Hardest Thing in the World"	The Stone Roses	2:43
2.	"Keep the Circle Around"	Inspiral Carpets	3:48
3.	"Indiepop Ain't Noise Pollution"	The Pooh Sticks	2:13
4.	"Solace"	The Sea Urchins	3:50
5.	"Only (A Prawn in Whitby)"	Cud	3:07
6.	"Landslide"	The Popguns	2:55
7.	"All Aboard the Love-Mobile"	One Thousand Violins	2:28
8.	"I'm in Love with a Girl Who Doesn't Know I Exist"	Another Sunny Day	1:39
9.	"Strawberry Window"	East Village	2:36
10.	"Choirboys Gas (Hack the Cassock)"	Bad Dream Fancy Dress	2:16
11.	"Circle Line"	Rodney Allen	3:24
12.	"I've Got a Habit"	The Orchids	2:33
13.	"Skin Storm"	Bradford	3:13
14.	"Are You Happy Now?"	The Charlottes	1:51
15.	"Picking Up the Bitter Little Pieces"	The Claim	3:13
16.	"Dreamabout"	The Poppyheads	4:16
17.	"Adam's Song"	The Sun & The Moon	2:40
18.	"Jesse Man Rae"	The McTells	3:05
19.	"Cecil Beaton's Scrapbook"	Would-Be-Goods	2:54
20.	"Speak to Me Rochelle"	The Desert Wolves	2:27
21.	"Dry the Rain"	The Rain	2:35
22.	"Forever Holiday"	Blow-Up	4:08
23.	"Suburban Love Songs"	The Fanatics	2:23
24.	"Roses"	Milltown Brothers	3:05
25.	"Sun Is in the Sky"	The Seers	3:11
26.	"Perfect Needle"	The Telescopes	3:28
27.	"Catweazle"	The Boo Radleys	3:22
