= Paste (magazine) =

American music and entertainment digital magazine

- Editor: Matt Mitchell
- Categories: Online; American music
- Frequency: Digital, monthly
- Publisher: Paste Media Group
- First issue: July 2002; 24 years ago
- Final issue: August 31, 2010; 16 years ago (print)
- Country: United States
- Based in: 2852 E College Ave. Decatur, Georgia, U.S.
- Language: English
- Website: pastemagazine.com
- ISSN: 1540-3106
- OCLC: 49937508

Paste is an American monthly music and entertainment digital magazine, headquartered in Atlanta, Georgia, with studios in Atlanta and Manhattan, and owned by Paste Media Group. The magazine began as a website in 1998, then ran as a print publication from 2002 until 2010, when it changed to an online only publication.

== History ==
The magazine was founded as a quarterly in July 2002 and was owned by Josh Jackson, Nick Purdy, and Tim Regan-Porter.

In October 2007, the magazine tried the "Radiohead experiment", offering new and current subscribers the ability to pay what they wanted for a one-year subscription to Paste. The subscriber base increased by 28,000, but Paste president Tim Regan-Porter noted the model was not sustainable; he hoped the new subscribers would renew the following year at the current rates and the increase in web traffic would attract additional subscribers and advertisers.

Amidst an economic downturn, Paste began to suffer from lagging ad revenue, as did other magazine publishers in 2008 and 2009. On May 14, 2009, Paste editors announced a plan to save the magazine, by pleading to its readers, musicians and celebrities for contributions. Cost-cutting by the magazine did not stem the losses. The crux cited for the financial troubles was the lack of advertiser spending.

In 2009, Paste launched an hour-long TV pilot for Halogen TV called Pop Goes the Culture.

On August 31, 2010, Paste suspended the print magazine, but continues publication as the online PasteMagazine.com.

=== Paste Media Group ===
Paste Media Group began expanding in November 2023 when it acquired US-based news and culture site Jezebel and left-leaning news and opinion site Splinter from G/O Media after both sites closed down, relaunching them in December 2023 and March 2024, respectively. It also purchased The A.V. Club, another former G/O Media property, in March 2024. In October 2024, G/O Media filed a lawsuit against Paste Media alleging a breach in contract from the sale of Jezebel and Splinter.

In July 2025, Paste spun-off its games section into Paste Media Group's fifth publication, Endless Mode, expanding its reach to include anime, tabletop, pinball, and theme parks. Garrett Martin, who had been Paste's games editor since 2011, became the new publication's Editor-in-Chief. In November 2025, Paste Media Group announced that Paste would refocus exclusively on music coverage. As part of the restructuring, the magazine closed its movie and TV divisions, with future reporting on these topics to come from The A.V. Club. The shift resulted in layoffs. At the same time, Endless Mode was merged into the games section of The A.V. Club as The A.V. Club Games, though no layoffs occurred. Later that month, Paste Media president Josh Jackson announced that Splinter would be merged into Jezebel. Jackson explained that while Paste Media had revived two inactive outlets, Splinter "had lain dormant far longer" than Jezebel, and that, along with ongoing industry pressures, led the company to combine the two under the Jezebel brand. In May 2026, Kotaku and Aftermath reported that the games vertical was effectively shuttered after Paste Media laid off The A.V. Club Games staff, including Martin.

Matt Mitchell, who had been Paste’s music editor since 2023, became the publication’s new Editor-in-Chief in June 2026.

== Content ==
Its tagline is "Signs of Life in Music, Film and Culture". Paste's initial focus was music, covering a variety of genres with an emphasis on adult album alternative, Americana and indie rock, along with independent film and books. Each issue originally included a CD music sampler but was dropped in favor of digital downloading as a Going-Green initiative. Featured artists included Paul McCartney, Ryan Adams, Blackalicious, Regina Spektor, the Whigs, Fiona Apple, the Decemberists, Mark Heard, Woven Hand, Milton and the Devils Party, Liam Finn, the Trolleyvox, and Thom Yorke. Many of these artists also contributed to the Campaign to Save Paste.

=== Album of the Year ===
| Year | Artist | Album | Ref. |
|---|---|---|---|
| 2006 | The Decemberists | The Crane Wife | |
| 2007 | The National | Boxer | |
| 2008 | She & Him | Volume One | |
| 2009 | The Avett Brothers | I and Love and You | |
| 2010 | LCD Soundsystem | This Is Happening | |
| 2011 | Bon Iver | Bon Iver | |
| 2012 | Frank Ocean | Channel Orange | |
| 2013 | Phosphorescent | Muchacho | |
| 2014 | The War on Drugs | Lost in the Dream | |
| 2015 | Father John Misty | I Love You, Honeybear | |
| 2016 | David Bowie | Blackstar | |
| 2017 | Jay Som | Everybody Works | |
| 2018 | Lucy Dacus | Historian | |
| 2019 | Weyes Blood | Titanic Rising | |
| 2020 | Fiona Apple | Fetch the Bolt Cutters | |
| 2021 | Floating Points, Pharoah Sanders, and the London Symphony Orchestra | Promises | |
| 2022 | Big Thief | Dragon New Warm Mountain I Believe in You | |
| 2023 | Wednesday | Rat Saw God | |
| 2024 | Jessica Pratt | Here in the Pitch | |
| 2025 | Nourished by Time | The Passionate Ones | |
