= Rockwood Music Hall =

Music venue in Manhattan, New York

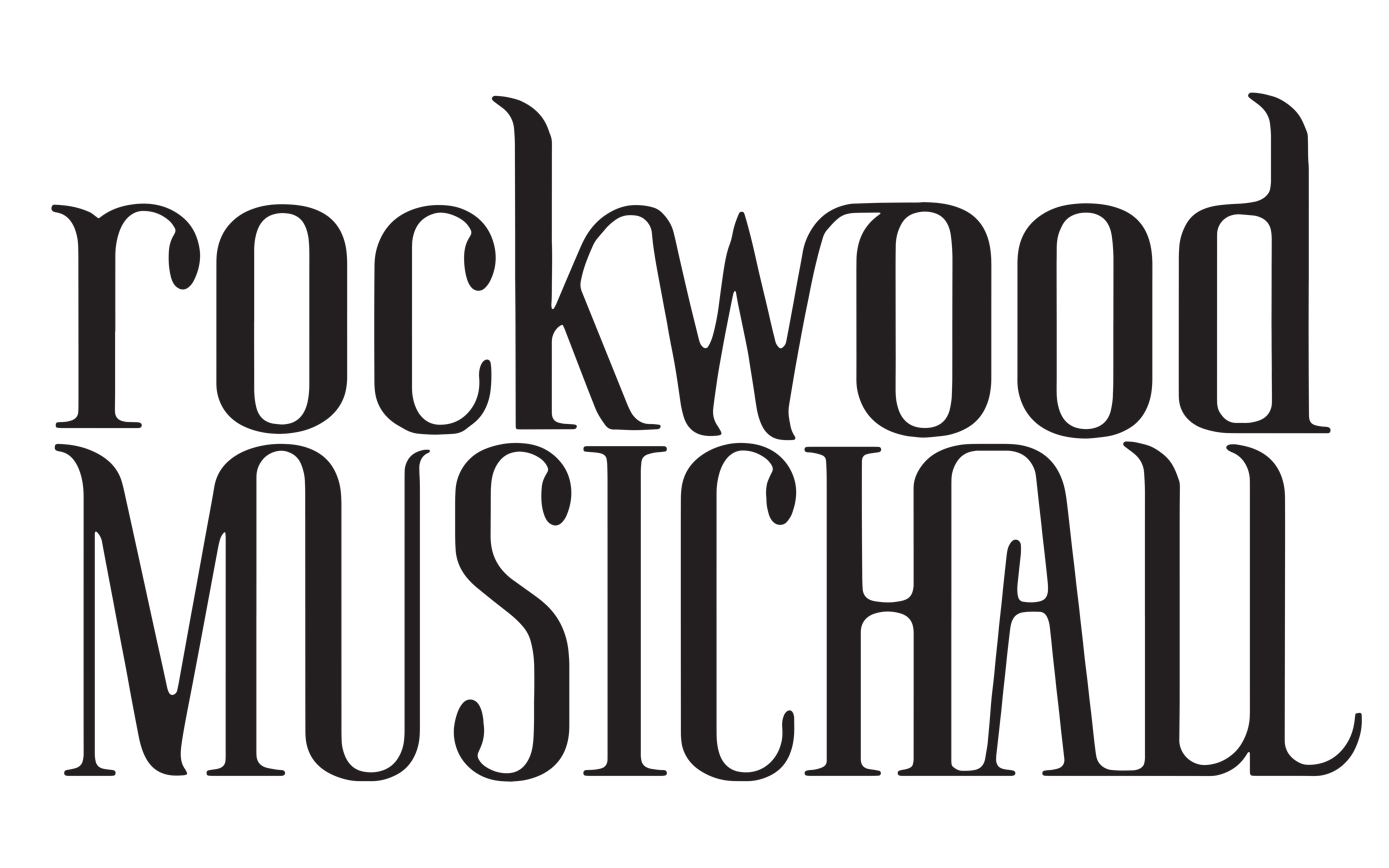
- Interactive map of Rockwood Music Hall
- Location: 196 Allen Street, Manhattan, New York
- Coordinates: 40.72229°N 73.988544°W
- Capacity: 330 (3 stages total)

Construction
- Opened: 2005

Website
- rockwoodmusichall.com

Rockwood Music Hall was a music venue at 196 Allen Street on the Lower East Side of Manhattan in New York City. Owner Ken Rockwood, a.k.a. "The Professor", opened the establishment in 2005 as a small bar and music venue. The venue featured three stages (2 larger rooms upstairs and one smaller room downstairs). Rockwood also had a record label, Rockwood Music Hall Recordings, which was founded in 2013.

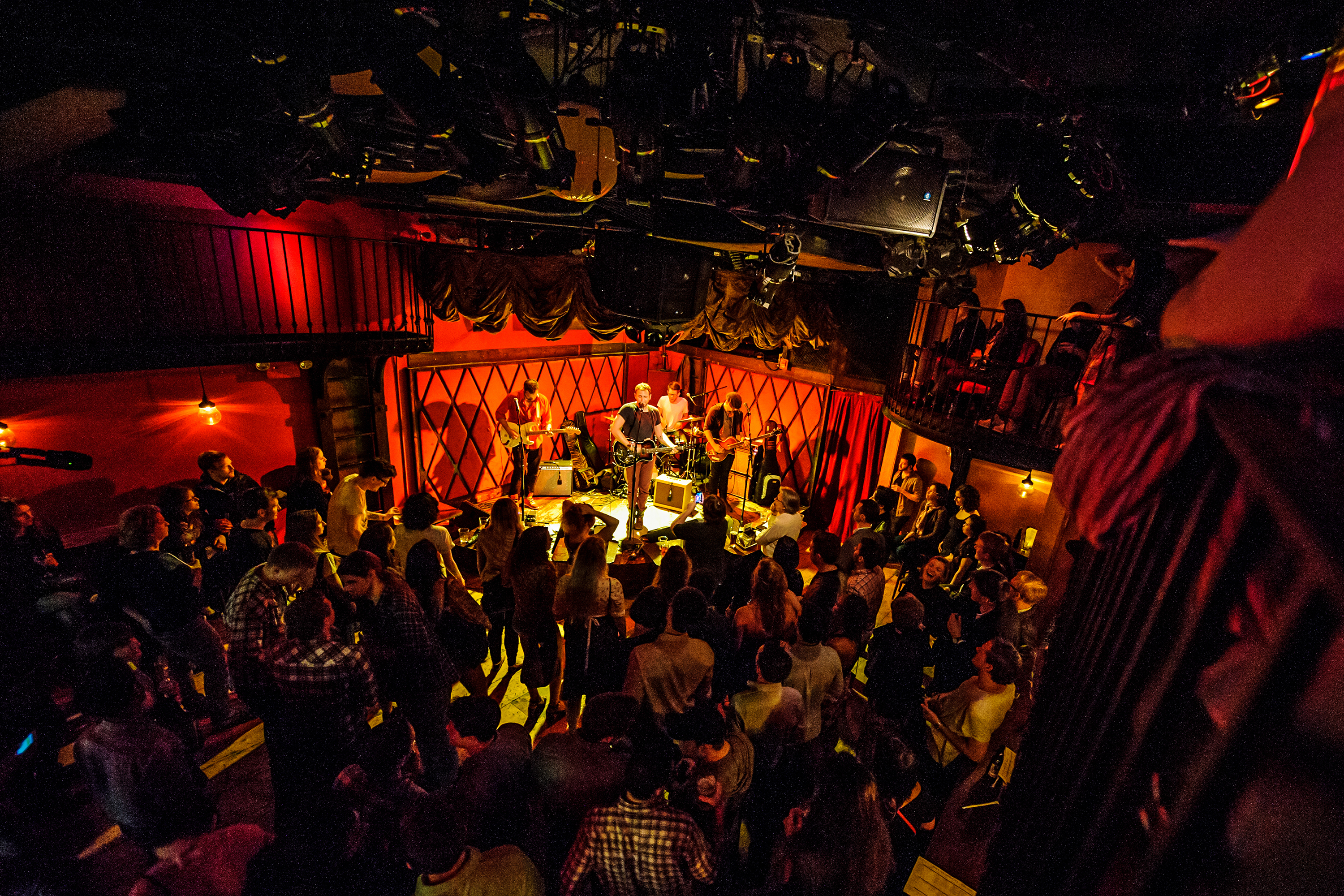

Artists who have performed at Rockwood include Sara Bareilles, Sting, Norah Jones, Lady Gaga, Between Giants, FREDO, Jessie J, John Gallagher, Jr., Giselle Bellas, Mumford & Sons, and Billie Joe Armstrong. Rockwood Music Hall closed in November 2024 without a formal announcement.
