= FTTW =

FTTW may refer to:

- FTTW, Fire Through the Window, an indie pop-rock band from South Africa
- F.T.T.W., the third album released by American hardcore punk band H2O
