= WRMC-FM =

Radio station at Middlebury College

Coordinates: 44.007°N 73.177°W

- Middlebury, Vermont; United States
- Broadcast area: Southern Champlain Valley, Vermont and New York
- Frequency: 91.1 MHz

Programming
- Format: Variety

Ownership
- Owner: Middlebury College

History
- First air date: 1949
- Call sign meaning: "Radio Middlebury College"

Technical information
- Licensing authority: FCC
- Class: A
- ERP: 2,900 watts
- HAAT: −9 meters (−30 ft)

Links
- Public license information: Public file; LMS
- Website: wrmc.middlebury.edu

WRMC-FM (91.1 FM) is the full power, student-volunteer-run radio station of Middlebury College. WRMC broadcasts a variety of content types, including talk, news, and radio drama, although the vast majority of the schedule is music of all genres. Shows are produced largely by student DJ's, although staff, faculty, and other members of the college and town community contribute content on occasion. Most shows last from one to two hours and generally air once a week. WRMC airs a reduced schedule during the summer, which includes shows produced by each of Middlebury College's summer language schools, broadcast entirely in the language of that school. The station also produces an annual music festival, called Sepomana.

== History ==
WRMC debuted as a carrier current station on May 1, 1949 at 1:00 pm with the call sign "WMCRS" (Middlebury College Radio Services). This original station was founded by John Bowker, an undergraduate member of the College's class of 1952. Originally broadcasting at 3 watts from a chicken coop at 129 Adirondack View, the station played six hours daily of music and interviews on 750 AM. In 1950, WMCRS added the capability to broadcast play-by-play commentary of College hockey and basketball games. For a time, the station broadcast over the College's bell system into dorm rooms and fraternity houses. In 1967, WMCRS expanded to 10 watts and began broadcasting at 91.7 FM. The following year the station first began 24-hour broadcasting, a first for any station in the Champlain Valley. In 1980, with the new call sign of "WRMC-FM" and broadcasting at 91.1 MHz, the station increased its power to 100 watts.

Sepomana Music Festival was first held in 1998 thanks to a loophole in the Student Government Association's financing rules. The name was invented and has no additional significance. The first festival was emceed by an Elvis impersonator and featured a live pig as a mascot. For several years, Sepomana was held in Coltrane Lounge in the Adirondack House. However, the event was relocated to larger spaces in future years due to overwhelming demand.

== Location ==
WRMC is located on the Middlebury College campus in Middlebury, VT - approximately midway between Burlington and Rutland on Route 7. The station's studios are upstairs in Proctor, the dining hall behind Mead Chapel. The transmitter is mounted on the side of the smokestack at the Service Building.

WRMC boasts approximately 150 student DJs during each semester. All members of the College are welcome to participate in the station's General Board meetings, which have historically met in the station lounge weekly at 5:00 pm on Mondays when school is in session. With the assistance of the General Board, the Executive Board is responsible for the day-to-day operations of the station. The Executive Board, which is composed of the General Manager, Program Director, Business Director, Technical Director, Social Chair, and two Music Directors, is elected annually. The General Manager serves as the Chief Operator of the station for the President and Trustees of the College, who hold the station's license with the FCC.

Alumni of the radio station include award-winning journalist Frank Sesno, Vermont Governor Jim Douglas, writer Jeff Lindsay, musician Anaïs Mitchell, NYC Parks & Recreation Commissioner Adrian Benepe, and recording artist Jonathan Tristram.

== Concerts ==
WRMC has brought a plethora of musical acts to the Middlebury campus over the years. Acts include Rilo Kiley, Yo La Tengo, Animal Collective, The Decemberists, Ratatat, Versus, Mates of State, Smog, Tenacious D, The National, Clearlake, Josh Ritter, Future Islands, the Death Set, Tobacco, the Bran Flakes, the French Kicks, The Ruby Suns, Menomena, The Capstan Shafts, Enon, The Books, Dan Deacon, Andrew Bird, Regina Spektor, Das Racist, Palms Out Sounds, Marcus Price, Boody B, Flipturn, and E-603 among others.
