= Caveboy (band) =

Canadian indie pop band

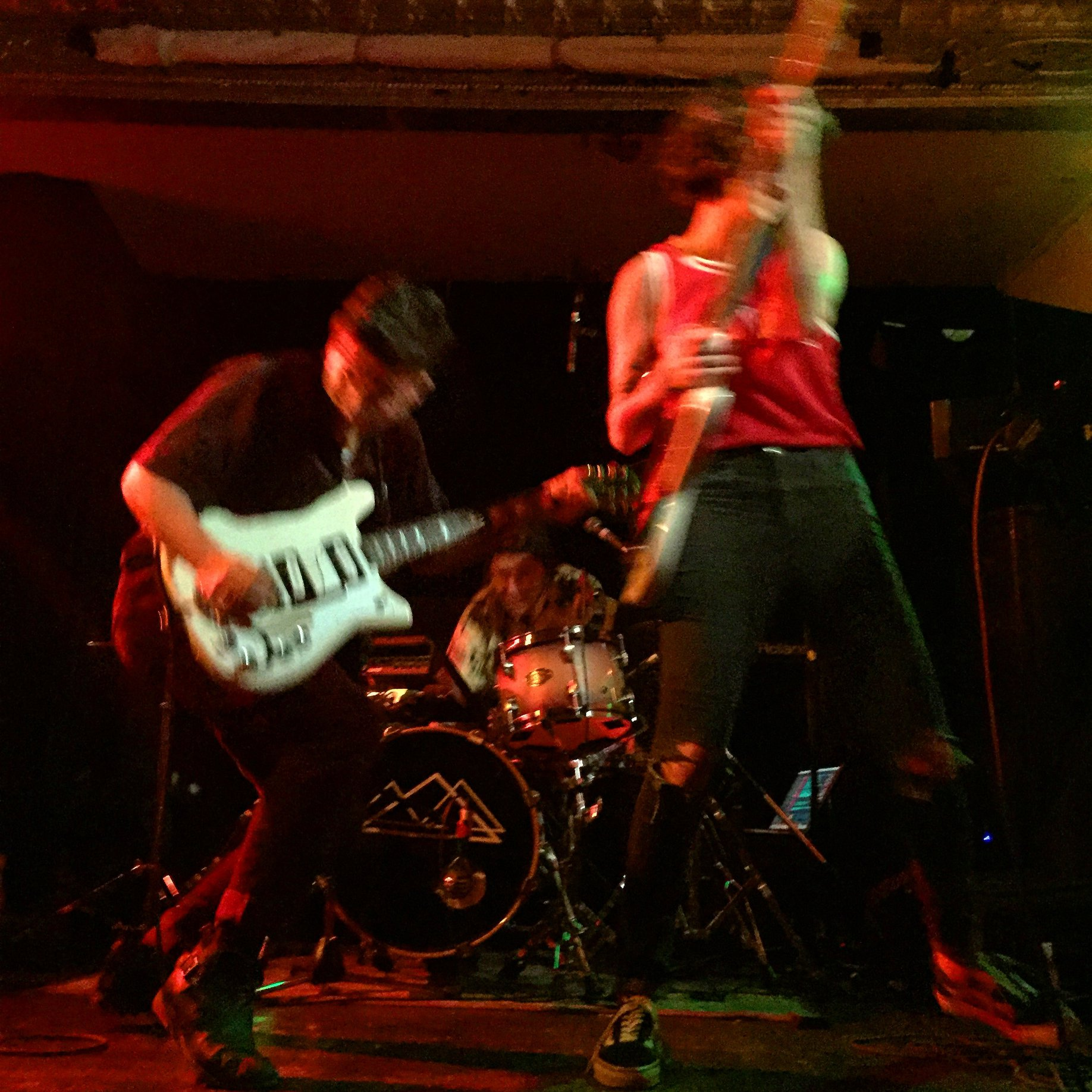
- Canadian indie pop band Caveboy performing in concert

Background information
- Origin: Montreal, Quebec, Canada
- Genre: indie pop
- Years active: 2015–present
- Members: Michelle Bensimon; Isabelle Banos; Lana Cooney

Caveboy is a Canadian indie pop band formed in 2015 in Montreal. The band released one self-titled extended play in 2015 and eight singles between 2016 and 2019. Their first full-length album, Night in the Park, Kiss in the Dark, was released on January 31, 2020.

== History ==
The trio originally played music together beginning in 2012 under the name Diamond Bones. They renamed the band to Caveboy in 2015. The members are queer-identified or vocal allies to the LGBTQ community.

Caveboy's song "Color War" was featured in an episode of the television series Orange is the New Black. Their track "Something Like Summer" appeared in the trailer of the 2018 film The New Romantic and in the 2020 Netflix miniseries Maid. The band's cover of the traditional Christmas song "Jolly Old Saint Nicholas" was featured in the 2020 film Happiest Season. The song "New Touch" appeared in an episode of The Sex Lives of College Girls. The song "Home is Where" appears in an episode of the American comedy-drama television series You're the Worst.

In 2019 the group toured with Canadian indie rock band Wintersleep.

In the lead-up to the release of their single "Hide Your Love" from their upcoming album, Caveboy created an online escape room-style game. Fans were given daily clues via the band's social media channels to solve puzzles. For each correct answer, fans were provided with a segment of the song.

On the week of October 31, 2019, "Hide Your Love" was voted the number one song in Canada on the CBC Music Top 20.

The trio performed two shows at the 2019 Halifax Pop Explosion Music Festival and Conference.

Their debut album, Night in the Park, Kiss in the Dark, was released on January 31, 2020. Album producer Derek Hoffman was nominated for the Jack Richardson Producer of the Year Award for the Juno Awards of 2020 for his work producing "Hide Your Love."

== Members ==
- Michelle Bensimon – lead vocals, guitar, synth
- Isabelle Banos – synth, bass, backing vocals
- Lana Cooney – drums, percussion, backing vocals

== Awards ==
The band won the Allan Slaight Juno Master Class in 2017. They performed the following year at the Juno Award Gala Dinner. Caveboy won the 2022 Her Music Award.

== Discography ==
=== Studio albums ===
- Night in the Park, Kiss in the Dark (2020), self-released

=== EPs ===
- Caveboy (2015), self-released

=== Singles ===
- "Color War" (2016)
- "Superbia" (2016)
- "Raconteur" (2017)
- "New Touch" (2017)
- "Landslide" (2019)
- "I Wonder" (2019)
- "Hide Your Love" (2019)
- "Silk for Gold" (2019)

=== Music videos ===
- "Home is Where" (2015)
- "Something Like Summer" (2015)
- "In the Grottos" (2015)
- "Monochrome" (2016)
- "Raconteur" (2017)
- "Landslide" (2019)
- "N.Y.P." (2020)

=== Lyric videos ===
- "New Touch" (2017)
- "Silk for Gold" (2019)

== See also ==
- List of indie pop artists
- Pop Montreal
- Halifax Pop Explosion
- List of bands from Canada
- List of musicians from Quebec
