= Medium Cool Records =

Former record label in England, United Kingdom

Medium Cool was a British independent record label, that existed between 1986 and 1989. Specializing in jangly guitar-pop, it released records by bands such as The Raw Herbs, The Siddeleys, The Rain, The Waltones, The Popguns, and The Corn Dollies.

== History ==
The label released its first record, "I Don't Need You" by The Enormous Room, in 1986. Over the next three years, the label released 21 records. The collapse of the label's distributor, Red Rhino, effectively brought things to an end.

In 2006, label owner Andy Wake blogged that he had been in discussions with Cherry Red Records regarding a label retrospective.

== Label catalogue ==
- MC1: The Enormous Room - "I Don't Need You"
- MC2: The Raw Herbs - "Old Joe"
- MC3: The Raw Herbs - "She's a Nurse But She's Alright"
- MC4: The Waltones - "Downhill"
- MC5: The Siddeleys - "What Went Wrong This Time?"
- MC6: The Raw Herbs - "Don't Bury Me Yet"
- MC7: The Waltones - "She Looks Right Through Me"
- MC8: The Corn Dollies - "Be Small Again"
- MC9: The Corn Dollies - "Forever Steven"
- MC10: Various Artists - Edge Of The Road LP
- MC11: The Waltones - "Spell It Out"
- MC12: The Rain - "First Of May"
- MC14: Drop - "The Boy Racers"
- MC15: The Corn Dollies - "Shake"
- MC16: The Waltones - "The Deepest"
- MC17: The Corn Dollies - "Map Of The World"
- MC18: The Waltones - Deepest LP
- MC19: The Popguns - "Landslide"
- MC20: The Corn Dollies - "Nothing Of You"
- MC21: The Corn Dollies - The Corn Dollies LP
- MC22: The Waltones - "Listen To Your Heart"
