= Morning Spy =

American indie pop band

- Origin: San Francisco, California, US
- Genres: Indie pop, indie rock, dream pop, shoegazing
- Years active: 2001–present
- Labels: Abandoned Love Records
- Members: Jon Rooney; James Spadaro; Mark Loftin; Alliso Goffman
- Website: Morning Spy

Morning Spy is an American indie pop band based in San Francisco, California on the Abandoned Love Records label. Morning Spy was formed by singer-songwriter and bassist Jon Rooney and drummer Mark Loftin in 2001. Their sound has been compared Luna, Yo La Tengo and The Velvet Underground. "Foggy Filter" from The Silver Age was chosen for the Eric Chaikin documentary A Lawyer Walks into a Bar, and "Daughters of History" from Subsequent Light was in episode No. 317 of The Ghost Whisperer.

== Original and Current Lineup ==
- Jon Rooney – vocals, bass
- James Spadaro – guitar
- Allison Goffman – vocals, keyboards, guitar
- Mark Loftin – drums, percussion

== Discography ==
- Subsequent Light (2004)
- Two Horses EP (2004)
- The Silver Age (2005)
