= Abandoned Love Records =

American independent record label

- Founded: 2004
- Founder: Jon Rooney
- Status: Active
- Country of origin: United States
- Location: Seattle, Washington
- Official website: Official site

Abandoned Love Records is an independent record label, founded in 2004 in San Francisco by Jon Rooney of the independent rock band Morning Spy and solo project Virgin of the Birds. The label moved to Austin, Texas, in 2005 and then to Seattle, Washington, in August 2007. The label specializes in indie rock, lo-fi music, dream pop, and instrumental music. Abandoned Love Records took their name from a Bob Dylan song, titled "Abandoned Love".

== Bands and Artists ==
- The Capstan Shafts
- Grumpy Bear
- Like Pioneers
- The Lovely Sparrows
- Morning Spy
- Nire
- Parker Street Cinema
- Plot Against Rachel
- Tied to the Branches
- Virgin of the Birds

== See also ==
- Independent music
- List of indie rock musicians
