= I Was Raised on Matthew, Mark, Luke & Laura =

I Was Raised On Matthew, Mark, Luke & Laura

Studio album by PAS/CAL
- Released: July 22, 2008
- Genre: Indie pop
- Length: 51:39
- Label: Le Grand Magistery

Professional ratings
Review scores
| Source | Rating |
|---|---|
| AllMusic | 4/5 stars |
| PopMatters | 9/10 stars |
| Pitchfork | (7.7/10) |
| Spin | 3/5 stars |

I Was Raised On Matthew, Mark, Luke & Laura is the debut full-length album released by the band PAS/CAL.

== Track listing ==
1. "The Truth Behind All the Vogues She Sold" – 4:38
2. "You Were Too Old for Me" – 6:01
3. "We Made Our Way, We Amtrakked" – 5:39
4. "Summer Is Almost Here" – 3:40
5. "Glorious Ballad of the Ignored" – 4:52
6. "O Honey We're Ridiculous" – 3:35
7. "Dearest Bernard Living" – 5:19
8. "Little Red Radio" – 3:04
9. "Suite Cherry: Cherry Needs a Name" – 2:19
10. "Suite Cherry: Cherry Tree" – 1:28
11. "Suite Cherry: Oh My Cherry" – 5:36
12. "Citizens Army Uniform" – 5:36
