= Muni He =

Chinese professional golfer (born 1999)

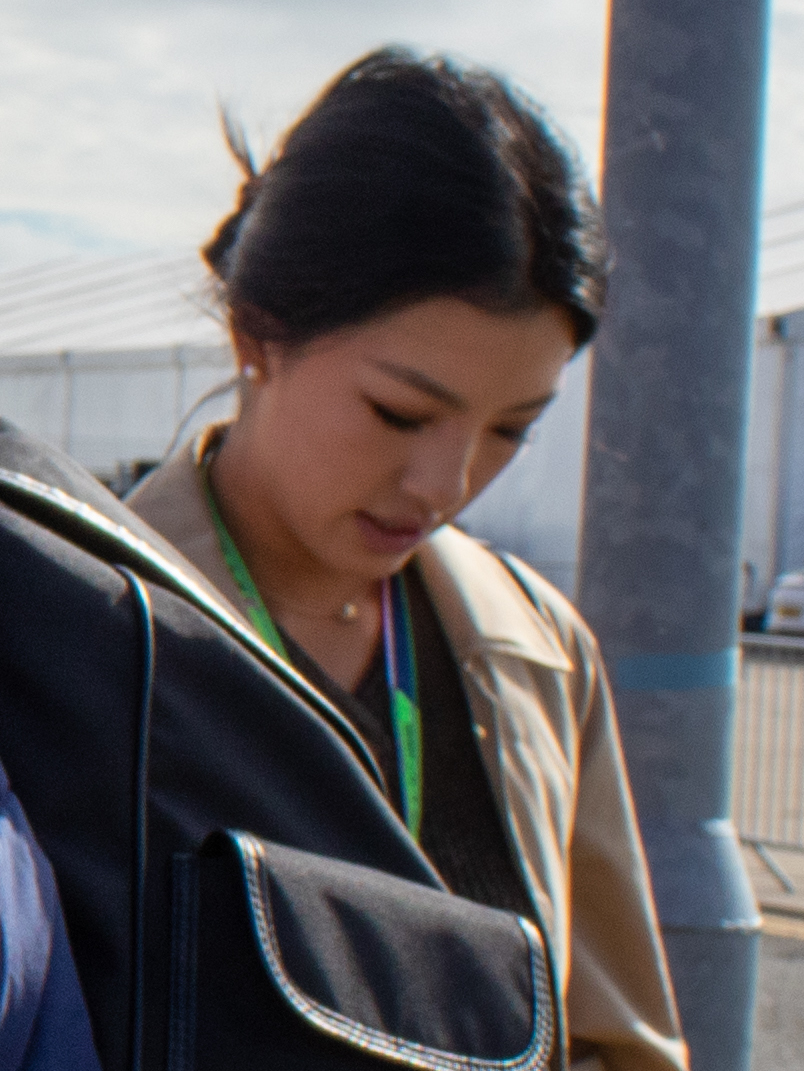
- He at the 2022 British Grand Prix

Personal information
- Full name: Muni He
- Nickname: Lily
- Nationality: China
- Born: 16 June 1999 (age 27) Chengdu, Sichuan, China
- Height: 163 cm (5 ft 4 in)
- Life partners: Alex Albon (2019–present; engaged)

Career
- Sport: Golf
- College: University of Southern California
- Turned professional: 2017
- Current tour: LPGA Tour (joined 2019)
- Former tour: Symetra Tour (joined 2017)
- Professional wins: 1

Number of wins by tour
- Epson Tour: 1

Best results in LPGA major championships
- Chevron Championship: CUT: 2025
- Women's PGA C'ship: T60: 2022
- U.S. Women's Open: T53: 2015
- Women's British Open: DNP
- Evian Championship: T38: 2021

Muni "Lily" He (何沐妮; born 16 June 1999) is a Chinese professional golfer who plays on the U.S.-based LPGA Tour.

== Early life and education ==
Muni He was born in Chengdu, Sichuan, China. Her father, a hotelier and restaurateur, introduced her to golf at a young age and by age five, she was already playing competitively. Her family moved to Pitt Meadows, British Columbia, and later to San Diego, California. She studied at Torrey Pines High School in San Diego. In the United States, she was able to play golf more regularly and she joined San Diego and Southern California junior golf tournaments, alongside U.S. Kids' Golf and American Junior Golf Association events. Before turning pro, she spent one year at the University of Southern California, majoring in communications.

== Career ==
As an amateur, she won the 2015 Polo Junior Classic and the 2017 Minnesota Invitational. She had four starts on the LPGA Tour and made the cut at the 2015 U.S. Women's Open where she tied for 53rd place. She turned professional in December 2017 and claimed her first Symetra Tour win in July 2018 at the inaugural Prasco Charity Championship in Maineville, Ohio. In November 2019, she won the eight-round LPGA Q-Series to secure her 2020 LPGA Tour membership. She has signed endorsement deals with Nike and WeChat.

== Personal life ==
Muni He has been publicly dating Thai-British Formula One driver Alex Albon since 2019. The couple announced their engagement in January 2026.

== Amateur wins ==
- 2012 Randy Wise Junior Open
- 2013 PING Phoenix Junior at ASU Karsten
- 2016 Polo Golf Junior Classic
- 2017 Minnesota Invitational

== Professional wins (1) ==
=== Symetra Tour wins (1) ===
No.	Date	Tournament	Winning score	To par	Margin of victory	Runner-up	Winner's share ($)
1	1 Jul 2018	Prasco Charity Championship	65-69-67=201	−15	4 strokes	(United States) Becca Huffer	15,000

== Results in major championships ==
Tournament	2015	2016	2017	2018	2019	2020	2021	2022	2023	2024	2025	2026
Chevron Championship											CUT	
U.S. Women's Open	T53						T57	CUT				CUT
Women's PGA Championship							CUT	T60			CUT	CUT
The Evian Championship						NT	T38				CUT	
Women's British Open							CUT					

Did not play

CUT = missed the half-way cut
NT = no tournament
"T" = tied

=== Summary ===
Tournament	Wins	2nd	3rd	Top-5	Top-10	Top-25	Events	Cuts made
Chevron Championship	0	0	0	0	0	0	1	0
U.S. Women's Open	0	0	0	0	0	0	4	2
Women's PGA Championship	0	0	0	0	0	0	4	1
The Evian Championship	0	0	0	0	0	0	2	1
Women's British Open	0	0	0	0	0	0	1	0
Totals	0	0	0	0	0	0	12	4

== LPGA Tour career summary ==
Year	Tournaments played	Cuts made	Wins	2nd	3rd	Top 10s	Best finish	Earnings ($)	Money list rank	Scoring average	Scoring rank
2019	19	9	0	0	0	0	T26	33,315	141	72.69	132
2020	7	1	0	0	0	0	T63	4,062	169	73.56	119
2021	20	10	0	0	0	0	T11	128,032	101	72.61	124
2022	20	7	0	0	0	1	T5	123,692	109	72.53	130
2023	14	9	0	0	0	2	7	121,855	120	71.08	49
2024	15	8	0	0	0	0	T26	55,859	157	71.91	88
2025	13	7	0	0	0	0	T21	73,636	139	72.54	122

Official as of 2025 season
