= Owen Biddle (musician) =

American bassist (born 1977)

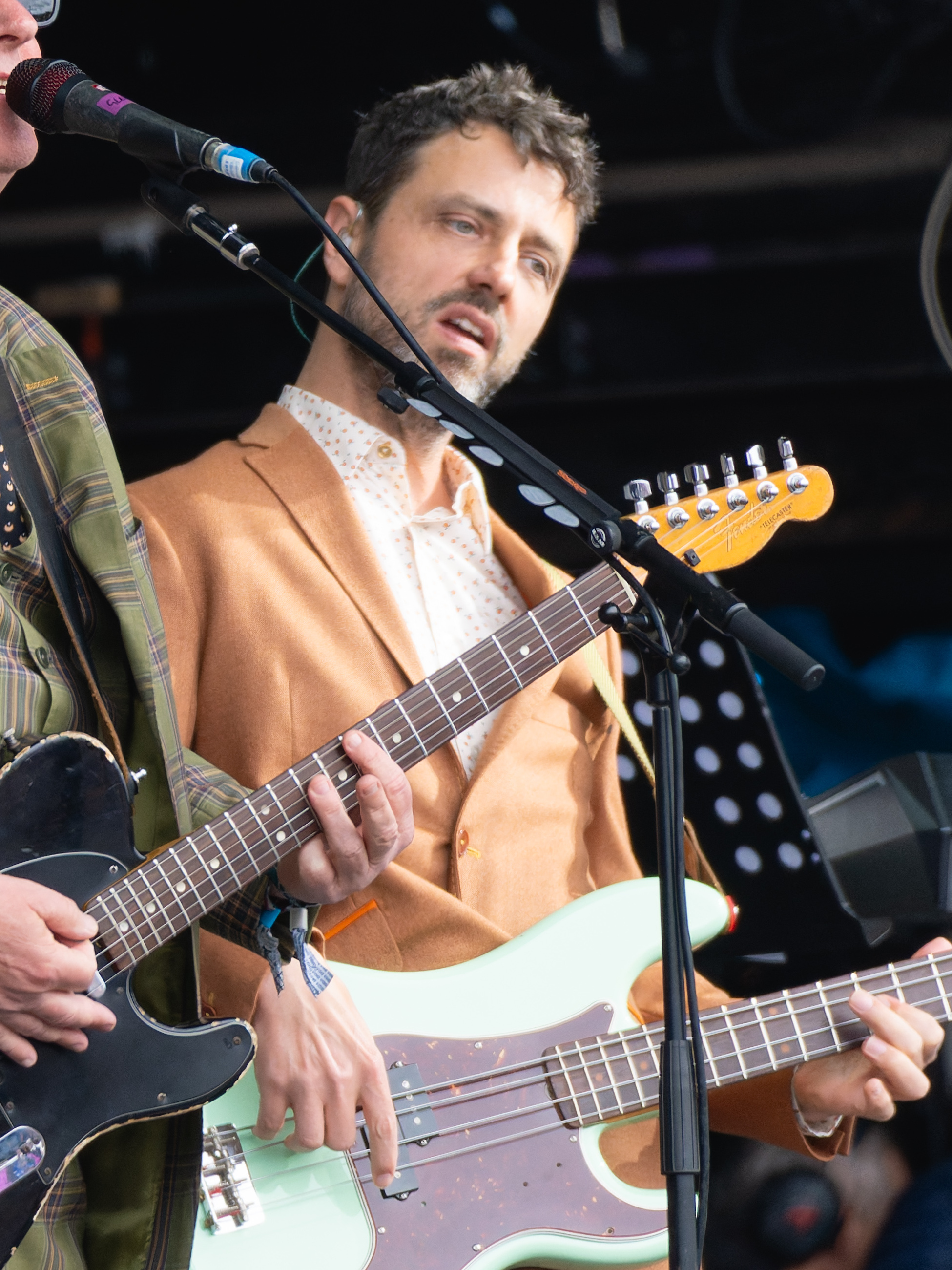
- Biddle with Squeeze in 2024

Background information
- Born: October 1, 1977 (age 48)
- Origin: Philadelphia, Pennsylvania, U.S.
- Genres: Alternative hip hop; new wave; alternative rock
- Occupations: Musician; producer; songwriter
- Instrument: Bass
- Member of: The Trolleyvox; Mister Barrington; Squeeze
- Formerly of: The Roots; Pepper's Ghost

Owen Biddle (born October 1, 1977) is an American bass guitarist known for his work with hip hop group the Roots. In 2011, he left the Roots to focus on his band, Mister Barrington. In 2020, he became a member of Squeeze.

Prior to joining the group, Biddle was credited with production and writing on the Roots' Grammy-nominated album, Game Theory. Other work includes multiple Grammy-winning recordings with John Legend in 2011, Booker T. Jones in 2012; also, with Al Green, Beanie Sigel, Baaba Maal, Jazmine Sullivan, Taylor Dayne, Enemy Earth, Jazzyfatnastees.

He is also a member of the Trolleyvox and played bass with the Philadelphia-based rock band Pepper's Ghost. Biddle is a member of New York City–based Mister Barrington, along with English keyboardist Oli Rockberger and drum virtuoso Zach Danziger.

As part of a recurring sketch on Late Night with Jimmy Fallon, called "The Real Housewives of Late Night", Biddle portrayed his fictional alcoholic wife.
