= Night in the Park, Kiss in the Dark =

Studio album by Caveboy
- Released: January 31, 2020
- Recorded: October 2018 – March 2019
- Studio: Fox Sounds, Toronto
- Genre: Indie pop
- Length: 33:34
- Producer: Derek Hoffman

Night in the Park, Kiss in the Dark is the first full-length album by Canadian indie pop band Caveboy.

== Track listing ==
All tracks are written by Caveboy.

Night in the Park, Kiss in the Dark track listing
No.	Title	Length
1.	"Silk for Gold"	3:08
2.	"I Wonder"	3:24
3.	"Hide Your Love"	3:22
4.	"Lifetime"	3:06
5.	"N.Y.P."	3:10
6.	"Find Me"	3:31
7.	"Obsessed"	3:21
8.	"Guess I've Changed"	3:58
9.	"Landslide"	3:11
10.	"Up in Flames"	3:21
Total length:		33:34

== Personnel ==
- Michelle Bensimon – lead vocals, guitar, synth
- Isabelle Banos – synth, bass, backing vocals
- Lana Cooney – drums, percussion, backing vocals, album layout and design
- Derek Hoffman - producer
- Kelly Jacob - album photos

== See also ==
- List of 2020 albums
