= Flower of the Soul =

2024 studio album by Liana Flores

Studio album by Liana Flores
- Released: 28 June 2024
- Genres: Bossa nova; folk-pop
- Length: 38:41
- Labels: Verve; Fiction
- Producers: Liana Flores; Noah Georgeson

Liana Flores chronology
Recently (2019)	Flower of the Soul (2024)

Alternative cover
- Flower of the Soul (Full Bloom)

Singles from Flower of the Soul
- 1. "I Wish for the Rain" Released: 24 April 2024; 2. "Nightvisions" Released: 15 May 2024; 3. "Orange-Coloured Day" Released: 5 June 2024

Flower of the Soul (stylized in sentence case) is the debut studio album by the British-Brazilian singer-songwriter Liana Flores, released on 28 June 2024 through Verve and Fiction. It follows her 2019 extended play Recently. Tim Bernardes of the band O Terno contributes a guest appearance. The album was supported by three singles, "I Wish for the Rain", "Nightvisions", and "Orange-Coloured Day". A deluxe version of the album, Flower of the Soul (Full Bloom), was released on 25 October 2024.

== Background and recording ==
Liana Flores released her first EP The Water's Fine! in 2018 and her second EP, Recently, in 2019. The song "rises the moon" off the latter record went viral in 2021 and led her to sign with Verve Records. She was inspired to make the album by her time in nature while studying zoology at the University of St Andrews. Flores was inspired to call the album Flower of the Soul from a fortune cookie that said "imagination is the eye of the soul", which reminded her of a lyric from the Kate Bush song "Moving", "You crush the lily in my soul".

== Production and composition ==
=== Overview ===
Flower of the Soul is primarily a bossa nova and folk-pop album. Liana Flores stated on an Instagram story that, during the making of the album, she was influenced by Vashti Bunyan, João Gilberto, Linda Perhacs, Pentangle, Joyce, Nara Leão, and Nick Drake, in addition to psychedelic folk, sunshine pop, and Brazilian jazz. Annie Parnell of Flood Magazine also compared the music to jazz pop by Astrud Gilberto and Laufey. Flores also said that Romanticism, flower power, nature poetry, fairytales, and fairies had a large impact. Flores stated that one of the themes of the album is "transience" as "many of the songs live in fleeting moments, as flowers do". "[T]he question of what changes and remains during times of transformation" was also another concept.

=== Songs ===
"Orange-Coloured Day" describes the beauty of nature over a piano melody and guitar. Shahzaib Hussain of Clash described "Nightvisions" as a "folky lamentation building to a string-laden crescendo" influenced by Gothic fiction where someone tries to be romantic but ends up seeming delusional while chasing love. In "Crystalline", Flores reminisces her solitary walks on the beach while studying at St Andrews. Flores talks about the companionship of loneliness on "Now and Then", while "Halfway Heart" has a samba rhythm and is about the precariousness of an early relationship. "I Wish for the Rain" is inspired by classic jazz and describes a market stroll in the rain.

== Release and promotion ==
Liana Flores released the first single of the album, "I Wish for the Rain", on 24 April 2024. It was her first solo song in nearly four years since she released the non-album single "Sign" in November 2020, and her second song overall since that time, with her only release in between being in March 2024, as a feature on "My Heart's Not In It" by Matt Maltese. Flores announced the release of Flower of the Soul on 15 May and shared the single "Nightvisions". Its music video was directed by Angela Ricciardi. After the album's release, she promoted the album by performing at Rough Trade Records stores. Flores later embarked on a North American and European tour.

== Critical reception ==
Professional ratings
Review scores
Source	Rating
AllMusic	4/5 stars
Uncut	4/5 stars
WhyNow	4/5 stars

The album received positive reviews. Writing for AllMusic, Timothy Monger gave the album four out of five stars, saying that the album felt both retro and fresh in a significant leap forward for Flores. John Lewis of Uncut gave the album four out of five stars. Harvey Solomon-Brady, writing for WhyNow, gave the album four out of five stars, praising the production. He also affirmed that it was a quality debut that followed-up her virality.

== Track listing ==
All tracks are written by Liana Flores. All tracks are produced by Liana Flores and Noah Georgeson. All track titles are stylized in sentence case.

Flower of the Soul track listing
No.	Title	Length
1.	"Hello Again"	4:13
2.	"Orange-Coloured Day"	2:48
3.	"Nightvisions"	3:56
4.	"Crystalline"	4:39
5.	"Now and Then"	4:56
6.	"Halfway Heart"	3:45
7.	"When the Sun..."	0:18
8.	"I Wish for the Rain"	2:31
9.	"Cuckoo"	3:05
10.	"Butterflies" (featuring Tim Bernardes)	5:22
11.	"Slowly"	3:03
Total length:		38:41

Flower of the Soul (Full Bloom) track listing
No.	Title	Length
12.	"Borrow Mine"	2:23
13.	"Strangest Shapes"	3:21
Total length:		44:25

Notes

- All tracks are stylized in sentence case.
