= Liana Flores =

British singer-songwriter and guitarist

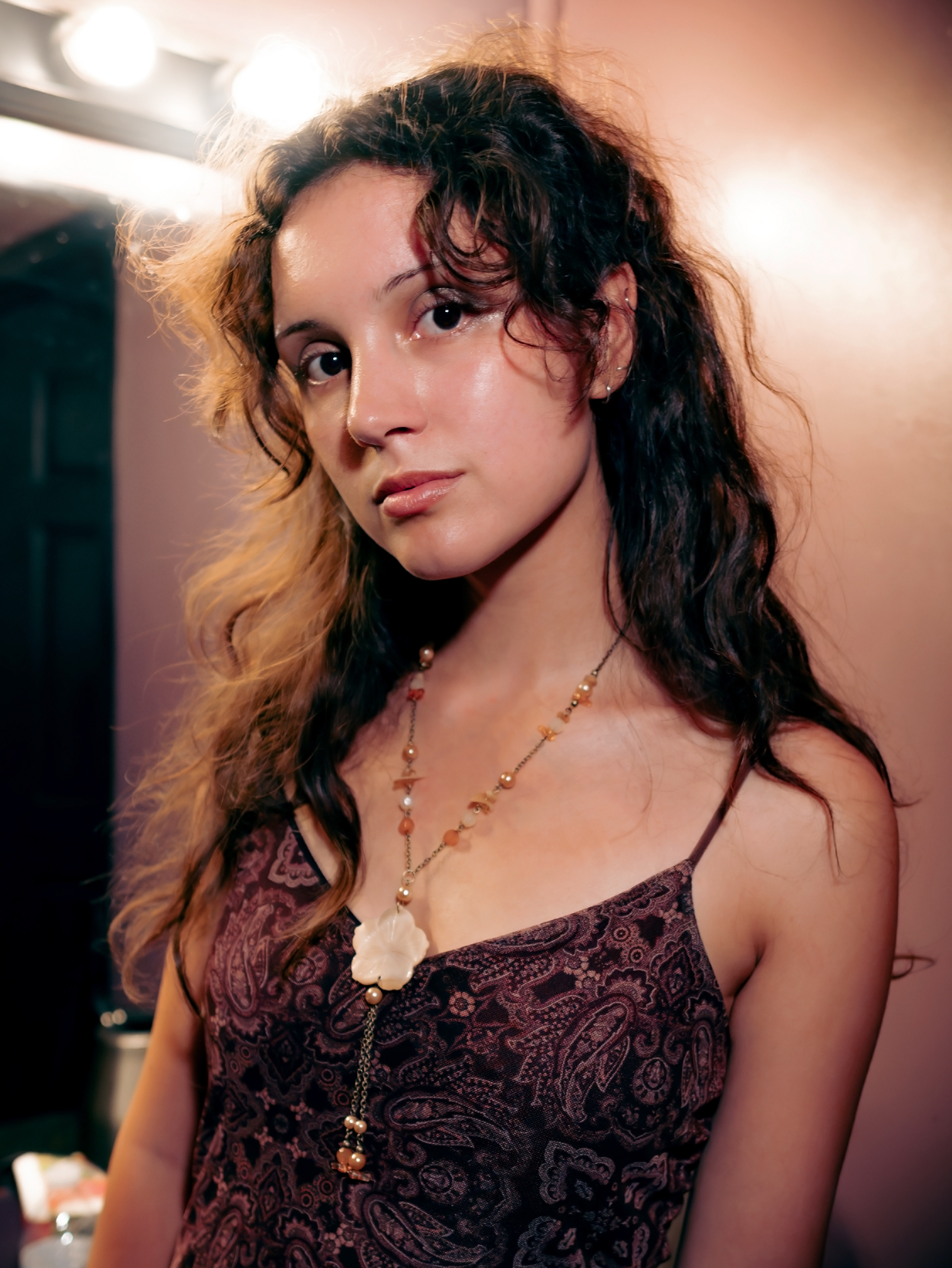
- Flores in 2024

Background information
- Born: 2 June 1999 (age 27)
- Origin: London, England
- Genres: Folk pop; bossa nova; jazz pop; indie pop; Brit-folk
- Occupations: Singer-songwriter; musician
- Instruments: Vocals; guitar; piano
- Years active: 2018–present
- Labels: Verve; Fiction
- Website: www.lianaflores.com

Liana Flores (Brazilian Portuguese: [liˈɐ̃nɐ ˈfloɾis]; born 2 June 1999) is a British-Brazilian singer-songwriter and guitarist. After independently releasing two extended plays The Water's Fine! (2018) and Recently (2019), her debut studio album Flower of the Soul was released under Verve and Fiction in June 2024.

== Early life ==
Flores was born to a Brazilian mother and a British father. She was raised in South Norfolk, England. In her youth, she listened to bossa nova artists such as Astrud Gilberto, Gal Costa, Caetano Veloso and João Gilberto.

Flores's musical journey began in primary school, where singing in the school choir was part of the school curriculum. She began playing the piano in childhood and took up the guitar in her mid-teens. Flores notes that she began playing the guitar because she loved bossa nova and wanted to play the Bossa Nova songs she listened to. Despite being of Brazilian background, Flores notes that she did not grow up speaking Portuguese. As a result, she finds music as a way to connect with her Brazilian cultural background.

Flores developed an interest in 1960s folk music in her late teens. Both of these genres would later go on to inspire her own career as a singer-songwriter. According to Flores, she likes the idea that both folk music and bossa nova can be done with just vocals and guitar, two key features for her when writing and performing music.

Flores says she felt "boxed in" during her later teen years; consequently, music became an outlet for her to release these feelings. Her public music career began with the help of TikTok and YouTube on her channel "Ukulili." Flores began independently uploading music on these platforms because she felt bored in Norfolk, commenting that there was not a lot to do there. On these applications, Flores would cover show tunes on the ukulele.

At the beginning of the COVID-19 shutdown, Flores began exploring music production. At first, Liana tried not to be too involved on TikTok. At the time, she was finishing up her studies in zoology and preparing to look for a job in the field after graduating. To her surprise, her song "rises the moon" went viral on TikTok in 2021. At first, Flores tried to put aside the success and was focused on finishing her degree from the university. However, with the success of this song, Flores was able to begin pursuing a music career. After helping to attract attention to her work, Flores signed with Verve Records.

In 2022, Flores graduated with a first in Zoology from the University of St Andrews.

== Career ==
Flores independently released two EPs The Water's Fine! and Recently in 2018 and 2019 respectively. Flores first gained viral traction in 2021 from her 2019 song "Rises the Moon". In 2022, Flores opened for Laufey during her Everything I Know About Love Tour.

In 2024, Flores signed with Verve Records. Her first headlining tour began in June 2024 as a month-long tour through the UK and the US. Her debut album Flower of the Soul was released on 28 June 2024. She toured through the United States, UK, Europe and Asia to support her debut album. Flores also opened for Matt Maltese that year, and toured with Men I Trust for the European leg of their Equus tour in October 2025. She also performed with Ichiko Aoba in the Royal Albert Hall as a supporting artist for her Across the Oceans tour on 31 March 2026.

On 24 June 2026, Flores announced an international tour, including her first shows in Mexico, alongside single "So It Goes". She plans to perform with 3 other musicians: Muco on the European leg, Temachii in Mexico City, and Allie Sandt on the American leg. Following this, she would release the single "Silvershoes" on 31 July 2026, and announce her third EP And so it goes... on 4 September 2026.

== Artistry ==
Flores cites Vashti Bunyan, Caetano Veloso, Nick Drake and Joan Baez as influences.

She enjoys Bunyan's untrained vocal style and how she wrote her album Just Another Diamond Day on a road journey, which also adds a layer of hardness to the work. Flores also creates lyric collages as a starting point when writing. Many tracks on the album are centered on relationships, whether with other people or with the natural world and animals.

== Awards ==
On February 2, 2024, Flores received the RIAA Platinum Award for her single "rises the moon," meaning that the single has sold over 1 million units.

== Discography ==
=== Studio albums ===
List of studio albums with selected details
Title	Details
Flower of the Soul	Released: 28 June 2024; Formats: Vinyl, digital download, streaming

=== Extended plays ===
List of EPs with selected details
Title	Details
The Water's Fine!	Released: 1 June 2018; Formats: Digital download, streaming
Recently	Released: 10 April 2019; Formats: Digital download, streaming
And so it goes...	Released: 4 September 2026; Formats: Digital download, streaming

=== Singles ===
List of singles as lead artist
Title	Year	Album
"Sign"	2020	Non-album singles
"Sinal"	2020	Non-album singles
"I Wish for the Rain"	2024	Flower of the soul
"Nightvisions"	2024	Flower of the soul
"Orange-Coloured Day"	2024	Flower of the soul
"Strangest Shapes"	2024	Flower of the soul (full bloom)
"So It Goes"	2026	And so it goes...
"Silvershoes"	2026	And so it goes...

List of singles as featured artist
Title	Year	Album
"My Heart's Not In It" (with Matt Maltese)	2024	Songs That Aren't Mine
"Koneko" (with Mei Semones)	2026	Non-album single
"Midnight Lullaby" (with Muca and Roberto Menescal)	2026	Non-album single

== Tours ==
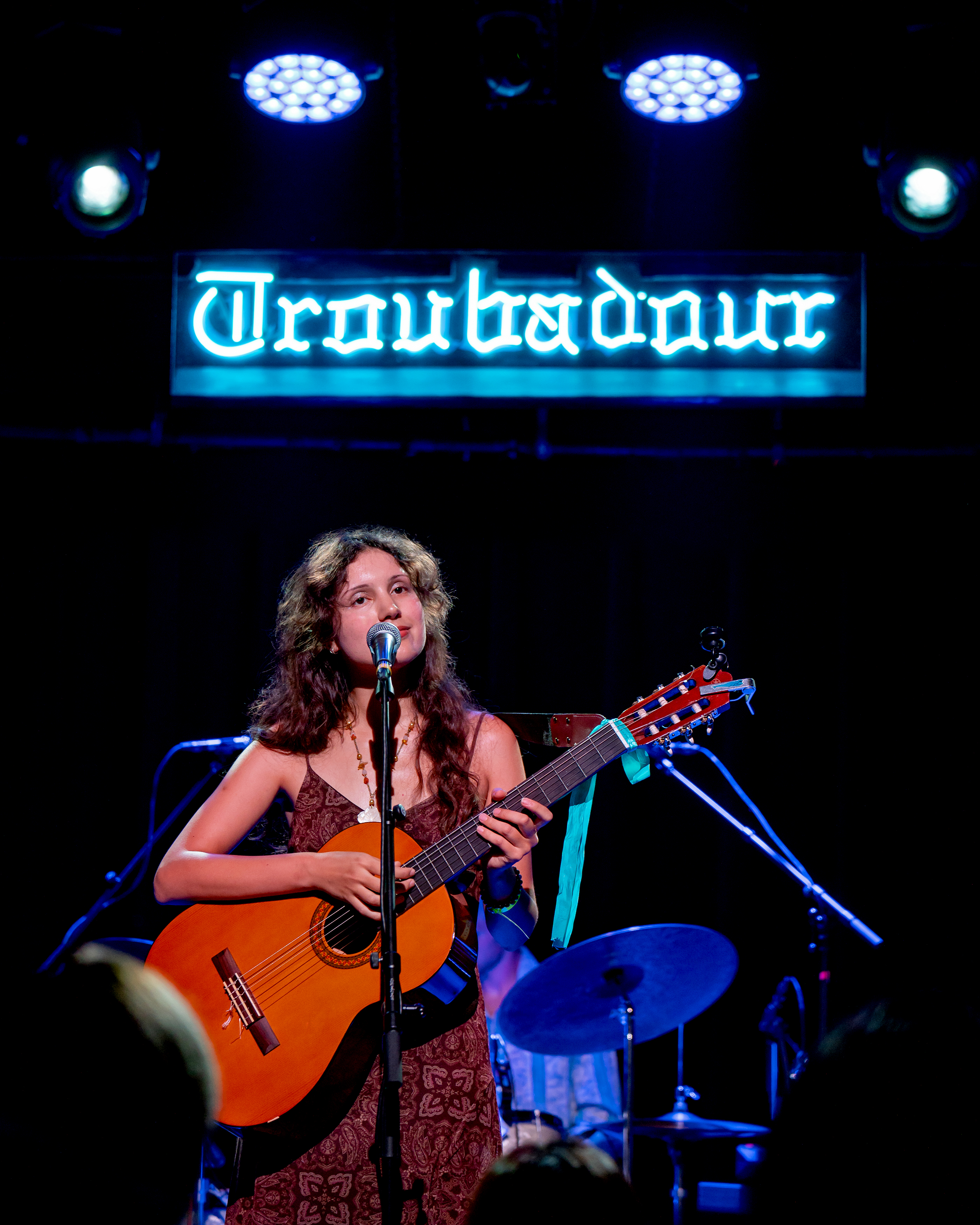
Flores performing at the Troubadour in 2024

=== Headlining ===
- US-UK Tour (2024)
- Tour of the soul (2024)
- Europe Tour (2025)
  - Supported by: Agnes Ea (Copenhagen), Giorgia May (Berlin), Veronika Valová (Prague), Mira Taylor (Vienna), iuri (Zürich), Março (Milan)
- So It Goes Tour (2026)

=== Supporting ===
• Laufey - Everything I Know About Love Tour (2022)
• Matt Maltese - Touring Just To Tour (2024)
• Men I Trust - Equus Tour (2025)
• Ichiko Aoba - Across The Ocean Tour (2026)
