= The Lovely Sparrows =

American indie rock band

- Origin: Austin, Texas, United States
- Genres: Indie rock, folk rock, alternative rock, experimental rock
- Years active: 2005–present
- Label: Abandoned Love Records
- Members: Shawn Jones; Jason Cooper; Robert Ellis; Gray Parsons
- Past members: Michael Landon; Earl Vallery; Lauryn Steinberg; Stephen Pierce; Steven Garcia; Sweney Tidball; Paul Brinkley; Nathan Siler; Steven Stark; Meaghan Perry
- Website: www.thelovelysparrows.com

The Lovely Sparrows is an Austin, Texas based indie rock band currently on Abandoned Love Records and founded by Shawn Jones. Their sound is categorized as indie rock, folk rock, experimental rock, alternative rock, or just rock, blending lush, complex arrangements with sing-along choruses that bring to mind folk-inflected pop and well-written novellas. Pulling Up Floors, Pouring on (New) Paint, released in 2006, captures the gorgeous melodies and warm, organic maladies of front man Shawn Jones. The September 2008 release saw the band embark on its most extensive touring to date, which included CMJ Music Marathon, Pop Montreal and South by Southwest in Austin, Texas. The Lovely Sparrows premiered the music video directed and animated by Eric Power of Clear Productions for "Year of the Dog" off Bury the Cynic during the 2009 SXSW Music Festival in Austin, Texas. The video was honored as one of the 25 best music videos of the year 2008 by MusicForants.com. Bury the Cynics was on the best of list by Fensepost (#2 album in 2008), The Bomb Shelter (#11), the Austinist (#5), Side One: Track One v1 (#7) and Side One: Track One v2 (#1).

The Lovely Sparrows band's "new record is now officially in progress" and targeting the record's release in 2010.

== History ==
Formed in 2005 by singer-songwriter Shawn Jones, The Lovely Sparrows is the culmination of over a decade of slugging it out in the southwestern indie rock circuit. The earliest incarnation of the band, which can be heard on 2005's self-released Take Your Hats Off You Godless Bastards 7″, reveled in Pavement and Bob Pollard-style laconic fuzz pop.

Their early bash and pop revelry, however, was to be short-lived after a romantic split between Jones and bandmate Meaghan Perry stripped away the band's fuzzy, upbeat pop leanings. Jones rebuilt the band, embarked on a brief, danger-prone West Coast solo tour, dealt with numerous house floods, and recorded the band's debut EP in the wake of that breakup. Friends as well as former, current and occasional members of the band contributed their talents to flesh out Pulling up Floors, Pouring on (New) Paint, which was released to small-scale acclaim on upstart label Abandoned Love Records. The EP received positive reviews from the likes of Pitchfork, Spin, Paste, and Harp, as well as a host of bloggers and radio stations such as KUT, KVRX, KEXP, and KSZU. The band showcased at SXSW Music Festival then embarked on a few short tours of the East Coast and Midwest, recording a Daytrotter session and picking up discerning fans along the way.

== Discography ==
- 2011 Tall Cedars of Lebanon (Abandoned Love Records)
- 2008 Bury the Cynics (Abandoned Love Records)
- 2006 Pulling Up Floors, Pouring on (New) Paint (Abandoned Love Records)
- 2006 Take Your Hats Off You Godless Bastards 7″ (Self-Released available through Abandoned Love Records)
