= The Bad Spellers =

Japanese band

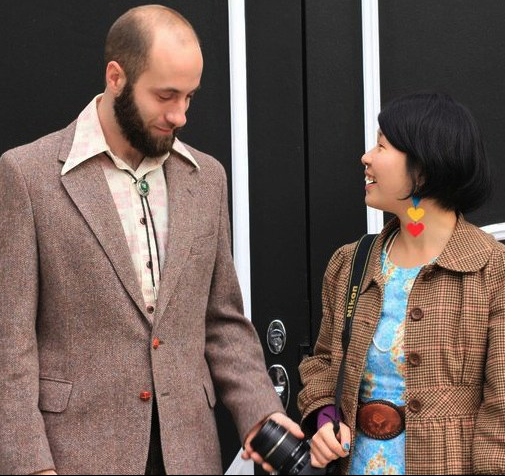

Background information
- Origin: Tokyo, Japan
- Genres: Indie rock, Indie pop, Twee, Casiopop
- Years active: 2003–present
- Labels: Post*Records
- Members: Tony Parmenter & Yasuko Ichinomiya Parmenter

The Bad Spellers are an indie-pop band from Tokyo, Japan consisting of husband/wife duo Tony Parmenter (guitar, vocals) and Yasuko Ichinomiya Parmenter (keyboards, vocals, toys).

Although officially forming in 2003, the two spent the following 2 years in separate countries, only able to write music together via the internet and on occasional visits. Before "officially" uniting in mid-2005, the band had been featured on a European net-release and 2 compilation discs.

In 2004, The Bad Spellers traveled to Canada to collaborate/record with Justin Langlois of The London Apartments (Universal Records/Beggar's Banquet Records). These sessions were released in March, 2005 to national (USA/Canada) distribution on Florida's Post*Records as "Fall in Love", a split EP with The London Apartments.

2007 saw the release of their first album, "Keep on Shining!", on Post*Records as well as the band's official legal marriage. The band relocated to the United States in 2009, and currently resides in Brattleboro, Vermont, United States. In 2012, the band embarked on a crowd sourcing campaign to self-release a vinyl LP of "An Album Titled As Ourselves" in early 2013. In 2016, the band released a music compilation titled 'other demos'.

== Discography ==
Albums:

- Keep on shining! - POST015, 2007 Post*Records
- An Album Titled As Ourselves - PCP001, 2013 Pop Co-op

Singles & EPs:

- Fall in love - The Bad Spellers / The London Apartments, POST001, 2005 Post*Records

Compilations:

- EP Club#5 - 2004 Asaurus Records
- For Whom the Casio Tolls - ASA034, 2004 Asaurus Records
- Post*Records & Friends present OLE! - POST011, 2006 Post*Records
- Stone Soup - NPP001, 2007 Post*Records / Nonsense Records / Pinky Ring Records
- GUTS - POST018/SBO003, 2008 Post*Records / Sleepy Bird Orphanage
- The Greenbelt Collective Compilation 3 - 2009 GBC
- The Starving Artist Compilation CD: Vol. 1 - 2011 The Starving Artist Collective
- YOUTH CULTURE DUMMY - BETA023, 2012 Beta Snake Records

Download-only:

- Girls Say Moshii net EP - RWB006, 2004 racewillbegin.com

== Sources ==
1. CD review on buzzgrinder.com
2. net-EP review on indiepop.it
