= RadaR Rock Band =

RadaR (a.k.a. RadaR Rock Band) is an American, Washington, D.C.–based indie pop-rock and dance band, which formed in 2014.

== Background ==
The group features singer and songwriter, Charles Maven (synthesizer, keyboard), Robzie Trulove (drums, percussion), Jay (guitar) and Joey Garcia (bass guitar). They say the name, RadaR, hearkens to actual Radars and how they function, stating that "people send frequencies into the world through every action they take and thought they have, leading to finding and being found by others on the same wavelength". With the release of their first single, "Give Up on the Now" in May 2015, the band quickly began to garner traction, with over 15,000 views in weeks, hitting local Maryland radio stations including, 98 Rock, and various festivals, namely Baltimore's large Pride parade (opening for Crystal Waters and CeCe Peniston) and DC's Art All Night Event Jim Kaponey of the Chicagoist said of them, "it's just this sort of unexpected, totally under the radar (no pun intended) gem that makes music writing so rewarding..." in his blog. New York's The Deli Magazine Performer Mag and Chicago's Faronheit among others have been covering RadaR. The band has been recognized by the Songwriters Association of Washington with a finalist award for their single, "Any" in 2017, and Silver award of Rock/Alternative for their single, "Rage" in 2018.

== History ==
Charles Maven began his musical career producing and writing hyper-pop and rock and roll songs as a solo act in Virginia throughout the early 2000s and Robzie spent that same decade honing her skills under the tutelage of Rudy Bird who has recorded and toured with many notable artists such as Miles Davis, Lauryn Hill, Kenny Garrett, Dance Theatre of Harlem, Leela James; was featured on Michael Jackson's posthumous album Michael and worked with Amy Winehouse. After taking a couple years to study musical theory Jay spent 2013 touring from DC to New Mexico, while Charles and Robzie were embarking on a tour with previous collaborative project, Access Royale in Europe, following the project's signing with The Village. In the beginning of 2014, Charles, Jay and Robzie began working on new music together.
