= Luzer =

LUZER is a four-piece power pop band from Hamilton Township, a suburb of Trenton, New Jersey.

== Background ==
LUZER was formed by four students—Singer/guitarist/songwriter "Timmy Sean" Mahoney, drummer Dan Seeth, lead guitarist R. Dan Salyerds (known as Sally), and Bassist Chris Volk—at Steinert High School in 1999. At its formation in late 1999, Tim, Dan, and Sally were high school juniors and Chris a sophomore. Mahoney and Seeth (both formally of Life In General) brought in lead guitarist Salyerds to record their first independent LP, jokingly entitled Greatest Hits, in the summer of 2000. LUZER performed throughout New Jersey and Pennsylvania at music festivals, colleges, and clubs, building up a local following and selling copies of their debut album “Greatest Hits.” In August 2006, Salyerds (Sally) left the band and was replaced by Krishna "The Mania" Vasudevan. Salyerds is now a music teacher at Eisenhower Middle School as well as Roxbury High School. LUZER was also joined on certain performances by Philadelphia keyboardist John Icaro.

Supporting acts such as The Beach Boys; Albert Hammond Jr. of The Strokes; and Tim's uncles, The Mahoney Brothers, LUZER toured extensively, playing weekend mini-tours and music conferences. LUZER's influences ranged from The Beatles to Kiss to The Beach Boys, The Cars, and Queen. LUZER's first national tour was in support of a Beatles tribute act, Long Live The Beatles. All of the band's songs were written by Mahoney, who had known Seeth since junior high school and Volk since he was a small child. Very conscious of their appearance and persona, the band's members worked together to find an individual look for each member. The band was also recognized for catchy hooks and stage theatrics reminiscent of Kiss and Cheap Trick. The band released two E.P.s, two full-length albums, and a live CD.

== New projects ==
Volk, Seeth, and Vasudevan, together with Timmy Sean on vocals/guitar/keys, publicly launched a new band, The Celebrities, on January 1, 2007. The band spent much of 2007 performing around the east coast, but put the project on indefinite hiatus at the end of the year.

Since that time, Timmy Sean has been working with multi-platinum producer Kenny Gioia on a full-length solo album and a new band project, The Mania. The first EP from The Mania, This Time Around EP, also features two new versions of Celebrities songs ("She's Mine" and "You're Still On My Mind") as B-Sides.

== Discography ==
- 2000 - Greatest Hits
- 2001 - Fake Ass Rock Star (EP)
- 2002 - Fake Ass Rock Star: EPisode II (EP)
- 2003 - LIVE! Down On The Farm
- 2004 - Reset
- 2004 - The Yule Rock EP
- 2005 - Live At The Recher Theatre (DVD)
- 2006 - Come On Mandy (EP)
