= Swimclub =

- Swimclub at CBGB Festival 2013 (Matchless - Brooklyn, NY)

Background information
- Origin: New York City, United States
- Genres: Indie Rock; Indie Pop; Post Punk; New Wave; Garage Rock
- Years active: 2007–Present
- Label: Seehurst Records
- Members: Greg Adams; Kevin Bryant; Gene Davenport
- Website: www.swimclubband.com

Swimclub is a New York-based rock band formed in Brooklyn, NY in 2007. The group is composed of Greg Adams (vocals, guitar), Gene Davenport (vocals, bass), and Kevin Bryant (drums). While rooted in Rock & Roll the band draws on several different musical styles.

== History ==
=== The Users 1999 - 2003 ===
Swimclub is a later version of a band called The Users that was formed in Saratoga Springs, New York in 1999. Composed of Greg Adams, brothers Gene and Jim Davenport and Kevin Bryant, the group was more garage and college rock based. The Users recorded an EP called “Slaving for the Heartless” and self-released a limited pressing in September 2000. The single Radio Crash written by drummer, Kevin Bryant received moderate airplay on independent and college radio. The band was active until 2002.

=== Formation ===
First arriving in Manhattan in 2005, Adams later reunited with Gene Davenport in Brooklyn to begin recording demos for what would be Swimclub's NYC debut. After cutting their teeth at small clubs in the East Village and Brooklyn (and with Bryant back behind the drum kit) the band contacted Pete Donnelly from cult fave The Figgs and indie musician Brent Gorton to produce some studio tracks. By licensing their retro garage rock rave-up “Look Happy” to Project Runway winner Jay McCarroll's documentary “Eleven Minutes” the band was able to put the CD out themselves. In early 2009 they formed Seehurst Records and soon after obtained a distribution deal through the boutique label services company Virtual. Swimclub's eponymous first album was released on August 4, 2009, and was showcased live at the 2009 CMJ Music Marathon and Film Festival.

AM New York reviewer Charles Devilbliss describes the record in his review of August 18, 2009, "The four well-scrubbed gents of Brooklyn’s Swimclub have taken great pains to craft a debut worthy of the effervescent, matching- outfits ’60’s pop they clearly adore, and they largely succeed in crafting a set as pretty as it is perishable. Keeping things tethered to terra firma is a sonorous Stephin Merritt/Jonathan Richman vibe that steeps tracks such as “Souvenir” and “Everything Is Coming Around” in a tenor of toothsome melancholy.

=== Funhouse For Fiends EP ===
The band's second album, Funhouse For Fiends, was released on April 26, 2011. The record was produced by Swimclub and Stephen Schappler and recorded at Thump Studios in Brooklyn, NY. Mastering was completed by Fred Kevorkian at Avatar Studios in New York, NY LA Times writer David Greenwald describes the EP on his Rawkblog, "Brooklyn act Swimclub’s Funhouse for Fiends is a pretty great crash course in pop history. Singer Greg Adams, Morrissey perched on his shoulder, intones his way through a few generations of rock ‘n’ roll music — highlight “What You Want” offers handclaps, romantic befuddlement and ’50s guitars; “El Lamento!” brings in the ’80s synths; “Never Tried” dips into post-punk. But the band's textbook dives never go deep enough to distract from tunes catchy enough to win a Gold Glove and moving enough to wallow away your workweek woes." Funhouse For Fiends was showcased live at the 2011 CMJ Music Marathon and Film Festival.

=== Waiting For The Night EP ===
Waiting For The Night was released on November 23, 2018 for Record Store Day Black Friday as a special limited edition EP on transparent gold vinyl. The all analog AAA vinyl record was recorded live to 2" tape and mixed at Mighty Toad Recording studio in Brooklyn, NY by Craig Dreyer. The vinyl lacquer master was cut from the original 1/4" master tape by Dave Polster at Well Made Music in Cleveland, OH. Waiting For The Night was distributed nationally to a handpicked list of independent record stores and released digitally to all major services by Seehurst Records.

=== Albums ===
- Swimclub - Self Titled (2009)

=== EPs ===
- Slaving for the Heartless (as The Users) (2000)
- "Funhouse For Fiends" (2011)
- "Waiting For The Night" (2018)

=== Singles ===
- She's A Teaser (2010)

=== Compilations ===
- 22 Songs for Jeremy (as Swimclub) (2009)

=== Song Credits ===
- Look Happy Eleven Minutes (Regent Releasing) (2009)
- Look Happy Roadtrip Nation, Season 5, Episode 7 (PBS) (2008)
- Ready 4 Love Roadtrip Nation, Season 5, DVD (PBS) (2009)
