= Girlyboi =

American folk-pop duo

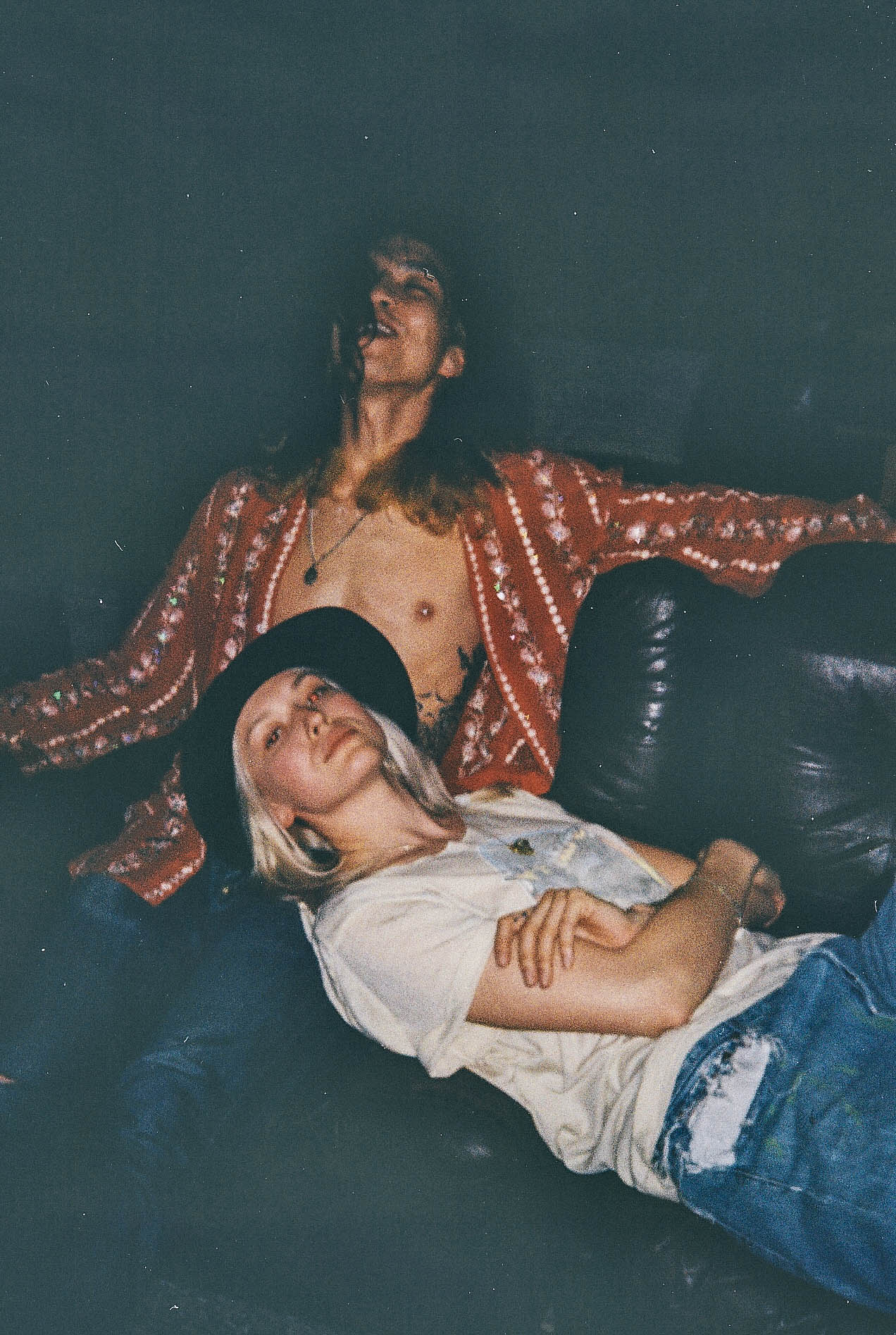
- Girlyboi at Shoreditch House in London

Background information
- Origin: Chicago, Illinois, U.S.
- Genres: Folk, Pop
- Years active: 2015–present
- Labels: Independent
- Members: Carly Russ; Joseph Matick

Girlyboi are an American folk pop duo originally from Chicago, Illinois. Formed in 2015, Girlyboi started recording and performing in Europe as an "act of love". After releasing three singles - "Actual Woman", "Whole", and "Bedside", Girlyboi released its debut EP, Actual Woman, on December 17, 2015, at Rough Trade Records in New York City.

Girlyboi released its second EP, Good Looks, in 2016.

== Formation ==
After meeting in Chicago, Illinois, Matick and Russ fled their home to pursue their musical career. They moved to Paris to escape the influence of American Pop-Culture and began to form their sound. In the midst of writing their first album, the couple were noticed by photographers and modeling agencies. The fear of objectification and "being packaged" frustrated Matick, but ultimately fueled the lyrical content of their music, which is described as "raw and self-aware".

== Discography ==
Extended Play

- "Actual Woman EP" (2015)
- "Good Looks EP" (2016)

Singles

- "Actual Woman" (2015)
- "Whole" (2015)
- "Bedside" (2015)
