= PAS/CAL =

American indie pop band

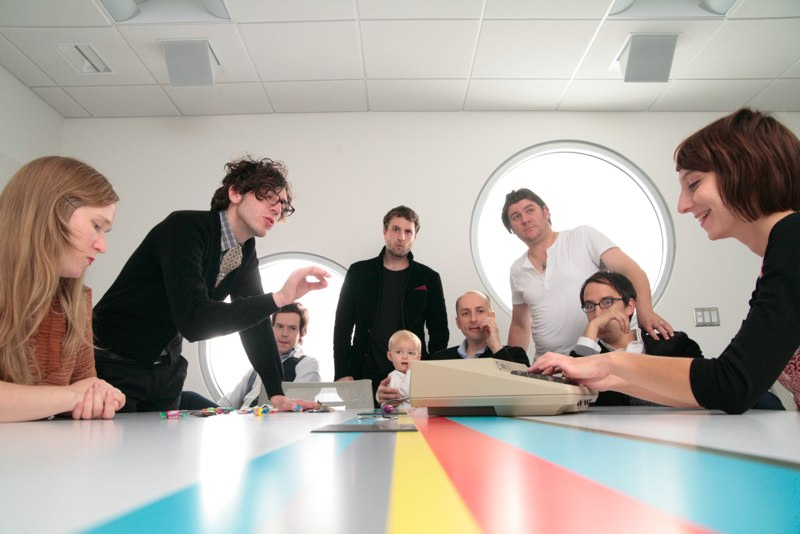

Background information
- Origin: Detroit, Michigan USA
- Genre: indiepop
- Years active: 2002–2008
- Labels: Le Grand Magistery; Romantic Air
- Past members: Casimer Pascal, Panic, Nathan Burgundy, Gene Corduroy, Little Tommy Daniels, Trevor Naud, Bem
- Website: http://pas-cal.bandcamp.com

PAS/CAL was an indie pop band from Detroit, Michigan, founded by frontman Casimer Pascal (born Craig Benedict Valentine Badynee). The group was active from 2002 until its disbandment in 2008 following the release of its debut studio album.

The band's debut LP, I Was Raised On Matthew, Mark, Luke & Laura, was released on July 22, 2008, via Le Grand Magistery.

== Critical reception ==
The band's album received reviews from national and international music publications. NPR featured the song "Oh Honey, We're Ridiculous" as a "Song of the Day," describing it as "a ridiculously catchy pop gem."

Pitchfork gave the album a 7.7/10 rating, with critic Ian Cohen describing it as "a work of painstaking, maximalist orchestral pop." Paste Magazine praised the record as "a gorgeous, lush chamber-pop record that recalls The Magnetic Fields and The Smiths."

The Swedish newspaper Sydsvenskan named the album one of the best of the year, calling it "one of the year's most irresistible pop explosions." Detroit's Metro Times profiled the band upon the album's release, noting its "literary, over-the-top, orchestral pop style."

== Discography ==
- I Was Raised On Matthew, Mark, Luke & Laura (Le Grand Magistery, 2008)
- Dear Sir EP (Le Grand Magistery, 2006)
- Summer Is Almost Here 12" (Romantic Air Recording Co, 2005)
- Season's Greetings from PAS/CAL & Asobi Seksu 12" (Romantic Air Recording Co, 2004)
- Oh Honey, We're Ridiculous EP (Le Grand Magistery, 2004)
- The Handbag Memoirs EP (Le Grand Magistery, 2002)
