= Roadside Poppies =

English indie pop band

- Origin: Cambridge, England
- Genres: Indie pop
- Years active: 2006–present
- Labels: WeePOP! Records; Make Do and Mend Records
- Members: Matloob Qureshi; Martin White; Duncan Scott; Adam; Lena; Morten
- Past members: Naomi Irvine; Abby Baker; Nick
- Website: Official website

Roadside Poppies are an English indie pop band, formed in Cambridge, England, in 2006, by Matloob Qureshi. They played the Kaninkanon V Festival in Copenhagen, Denmark, on 15 September 2007. They appeared at the Copenhagen Popfest, Copenhagen, Denmark, on 18 April 2010.

== History ==
Core band members Qureshi and White first met in the context of the Cambridge music scene. Qureshi invited White to join the fledgling outfit after White's previous band, Colonel Bastard, folded in 2006. Roadside Poppies released their first EP on Scottish indie label WeePOP! before recording their first album, One Day You Won't Feel A Thing, as part of the 2007 RPM Challenge. After a series of gigs played in Cambridge, Oxford and London, UK, the band undertook their first European tour in the summer of 2007, playing two dates in Denmark and Sweden. They played the Indietracks Festival in Butterley, Derbyshire on 27–28 July 2008. The White-penned single "Cute Susan" was included on the official festival compilation album, issued by Make Do and Mend Records.

Roadside Poppies has been subject to a changing line-up. The One Day You Won't Feel A Thing album was written and recorded while key member Martin White was temporarily based in Geneva, Switzerland. The 2007 Scandinavian tour was conducted without singer/violinist Naomi Irvine, who had quit the band earlier that summer. In July 2007, Roadside Poppies announced they were looking for a new female vocalist, and Cambridge-based vocalist Abby Baker was subsequently recruited. In autumn 2007 guitarist Nick left the band and relocated to Manchester, to be replaced by Adam. In January 2008, the band saw the departure of singer/songwriter Qureshi, who relocated to Copenhagen. Qureshi and White continued to collaborate at a distance, writing and recording a second album for the 2008 RPM Challenge, titled Mended Hearts and Broken Bones. The "broken bones" of the album's title refer to a road accident suffered by Qureshi, which occurred at the time of recording the album. By summer 2008, the band had acquired new Copenhagen-based Danish members, including vocalist Lena and guitarist Morten.

== Members ==
=== Present ===
- Matloob Qureshi - guitar, bass, vocals, harmonica
- Martin White - vocals, guitar, bass, mandolin
- Duncan Scott - keyboard, melodica
- Nick Peters - guitar, accordion, glockenspiel
- Morten Hougaard - bass
- Line Sandst - vocals and glockenspiel
- Elise Nimand Madsen - vocals and glockenspiel
- Claus Frøhlich - drums
- Kasper Clemmensen - guitar

=== Previous ===
- Naomi Irvine - vocals, violin, tambourine
- Abby Baker - vocals
- Adam - guitar, bass
- Mads - guitar

== Discography ==
=== Albums ===
- One Day You Won't Feel A Thing (2007)
- Mended Hearts and Broken Bones (2008)

=== Singles and EPs ===
- "Live at the Chateau Blanc" (2009)
- "Just Another Love Song" (2007)
- "An Apology (in the Key of C)" (2007)
- "Cycling and Crying" (2007)
- "Cute Susan" (Make Do and Mend Records, 2008)
