= The Corn Dollies =

English indie band

The Corn Dollies were an English indie band from London, active between 1987 and 1991.

Comprising Steve Musham (vocals and guitar), Tim Sales (guitar), Steve Ridder (bass), Jack Hoser (drums), and Jono Podmore (violin), the band met in King's Cross although they all hailed from Dalston, aside from native Californian Ridder. After their first Robert Forster-produced release on the Farm label, they released several singles on Medium Cool Records. The debut, "Be Small Again" was an indie hit, reaching No. 28 on the UK Independent Chart. The follow-up, "Forever Steven", originally released on the band's own Farm Label, was produced by Robert Forster of The Go-Betweens reached No. 16. They also contributed a track to the various artist compilation Bananas, an album issued to help the Football Supporters Association campaign against the ID card scheme that was being mooted by the UK Government at the time. They gained popularity throughout Europe after a tour in 1989, building a strong fanbase in Spain. When Medium Cool collapsed, they moved to Midnight Music, releasing two albums. In support of Wrecked, they undertook a national tour supporting Ian McCulloch, but with the album's success being limited, the band split up in 1991.

== Discography ==
=== Singles ===
- "Forever Steven" (1987, Farm)
- "Be Small Again" (1987, Medium Cool) (UK indie No. 28)
- "Forever Steven" (1988, Medium Cool) (UK indie No. 16)
- "Shake" (1988, Medium Cool)
- "Map of the World" (1988, Medium Cool)
- "Map of the World" (1989, Zine flexi, split with The Rain)
- "Nothing of You" (1989, Medium Cool)
- "Joyrider" (1990, Midnight Music)

=== Albums ===
- The Corn Dollies (Midnight Music)
- Wrecked (1990, Midnight Music)

== See also ==
- Corn dolly – straw craft work
