= The Waltones =

- Also known as: Candlestick Park
- Origin: Manchester, England
- Genres: Indie pop
- Years active: 1984–1991; 2017–present
- Labels: Medium Cool, Midnight Music
- Past members: James Knox; Mark Collins; Manny Lee; Alex Fyans; Adrian Donohue

The Waltones (later known as Candlestick Park) were a British indie band from Manchester, England, who re-formed in September 2017.

== History ==
The band consists of Alex Fyans (drums), Mark Collins (guitar), James Knox (vocals, harmonica) and Manny Lee (bass, backing vocals). Their debut release was the "Downhill" single, released by Medium Cool Records in April 1987, which, like the follow-up, "She Looks Right Through Me", placed on the UK Independent Chart. Third single "Spell It Out" gave them their biggest success, peaking at number 20 on the Indie Singles Chart. Debut album Deepest eventually saw a release in 1989, by which time they had lost momentum. The band also recorded a session for BBC Radio 1's John Peel Show in August 1988.

In 1990, the band moved to the Midnight Music label, and recorded a second album Re-invent the Wheel co-produced by Kevin Harris. After recording was completed, Fyans left the group to be replaced by Adrian Donohue. The band relaunched themselves as Candlestick Park. One single, "All the Time in the World", was issued from the album sessions, and a collaboration with Manchester-based House producers K-Klass was mooted. However the album was never issued and the band split, as Collins went on to greater success with The Charlatans (aka Charlatans UK).

A CD retrospective of The Waltones' Medium Cool output was issued by Cherry Red in 2007.

The Waltones re-formed in 2017 to play a gig at the Deaf Institute, playing the Kendal Calling Festival in 2018 and The 100 Club in September 2019 alongside The Chesterfields.

== Discography ==
=== Albums ===
- 1989: Deepest (Medium Cool)
- 2007: The Very Best of The Waltones: You've Gotta Hand It to 'em (Cherry Red)

=== Singles ===
- "Downhill" (7") (April 1987), Medium Cool - MC 004, UK Indie #40
- "She Looks Right Through Me" (12") (October 1987), Medium Cool - MC 007, UK Indie #49
- "Spell It Out" (7"+12") (July 1988), Medium Cool - MC 011, UK Indie #20
- "The Deepest" (7"+12") (October 1988), Medium Cool - MC 016
- "Listen to Your Heart" (1989), Medium Cool - withdrawn 12" single, MC 022T
- "All the Time in the World" (1990), Midnight Music - DING 67 (as Candlestick Park)

Split releases

- "Bold" (1987) - flexi disc that came free with Irresponsible Spirit fanzine, other track "All of Nothing" by Pigbros

=== Compilation appearances ===
- "The British Disease" and "Bold" on Edge of the Road (1988), Medium Cool
- "Smile" on Manchester North of England (1988), Bop Cassettes
- "She Looks Right Through Me" on Bananas! (1989), Rodney
- "She Looks Right Through Me" (demo) on Zine magazine Zine Sexy Flexi flexi-disc (1989)
- "As Tears Go By" on Stoned Again - A Tribute to the Stones (1990), Imaginary
