= Mega Gem =

American indie pop band

- Mega Gem

Background information
- Origin: Denver, Colorado
- Genres: Indie pop, indie folk, folk punk, chamber pop
- Years active: 2010 – present
- Labels: Wild Baby Records
- Members: Oliver Ceelen; Jenifer Rahn; Clark Walker; Mia Bandy; Tomas Campos

Mega Gem is an American indie pop band founded in 2010 and based in Denver, Colorado. On October 19, 2012, Mega Gem released their debut album, Colors of the West, on Wild Baby Records. Colors of the West features 33 musicians, including guest an appearance by Stelth Ulvang of the Grammy nominated American folk band The Lumineers While their musical style may vary from traditional punk music, the band is still influenced by the DIY-Punk sub-culture. The band's entire discography is available for a pay-what-you-want pricing scale on their Bandcamp page.

Their debut album, Colors of the West, was given a 5 out of 5 star rating and was noted as one of the top ten releases of 2012 by Marquee Magazine.

== Discography ==
Colors of the West (2012) - Wild Baby Records
Mega Gem - Demo (2011) - Self released
