= The Raw Herbs =

The Raw Herbs were an English indie pop band signed to Medium Cool Records, who had a number 19 hit on the UK Indie Chart in 1987 with "Don't Bury Me Yet". The band comprised Derek Parker (vocals, guitar), Kevin Bache (guitar), Steven Archibald (bass), and Brian Alexis (drums). The band recorded a session for Janice Long's BBC Radio 1 show in 1987. Brian Alexis, who had taken up teaching after receiving a degree in psychology at UEL, died on 17 May 2011 after suffering a deep vein thrombosis.

== Discography ==
- "Old Joe" Medium Cool
- "She's A Nurse But She's Alright" Medium Cool
- "Don't Bury Me Yet" (1987) Medium Cool (UK Indie No. 19)
- "The Second Time" (1988) Rooster
- "The Storm" & "At My Funeral" on Edge of the Road: Medium Cool Sampler LP (1988)
