= The Popguns =

English indie rock band

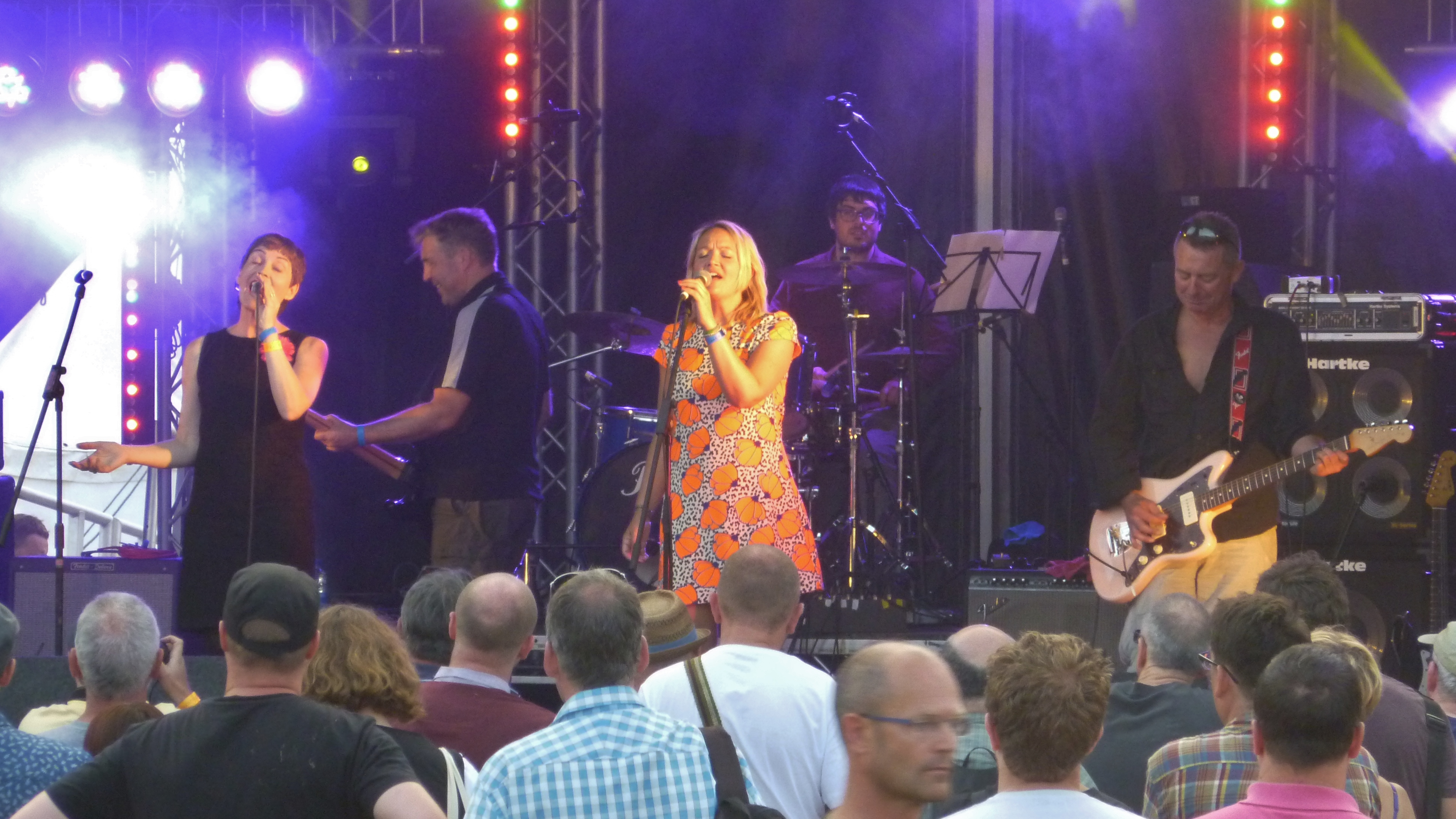
- The Popguns at Indietracks 2014

Background information
- Origin: Brighton, England
- Genres: Indie pop, alternative rock
- Years active: 1986–1996, 2012–present
- Labels: Medium Cool, Midnight Music, 3rd Stone, Matinee
- Members: Wendy Morgan; Simon Pickles; Greg Dixon; Pat Walkington; Kate Mander; Ken Brotherston
- Past members: Shaun Charman; Bill Cox; Mike Morgan; Paul F Bonham; Tony Bryant
- Website: popguns.net

The Popguns are an English indie rock band, which played a part in the British Indie pop scene. Originally from Brighton, East Sussex, they formed in 1986 by vocalist Wendy Morgan, guitarists Simon Pickles and Greg Dixon plus bassist Pat Walkington, and were joined by Shaun Charman, the former drummer for The Wedding Present in 1988.

== History ==
Their first release, "Where Do You Go?", came in the form of a split flexi disc (with How Many Beans Make Five?) given away free with an issue of a local zine in 1988. The next year this was followed by the single "Landslide", (released by Medium Cool Records), which reached number 20 on the UK Indie Chart, and made it to No. 46 on BBC radio DJ John Peel's annual Festive Fifty list for that year. The singles "Waiting for the Winter" (1989) and "Someone You Love" (1990) featured on their debut album, Eugenie (also 1990), released by the record label Midnight Music. The single "Still a World Away" preceded second album Snog, which was followed by the EPs XXX and Crazy (all released in 1991). Charman left, leaving the group on a brief hiatus which saw them lose a significant amount of their media coverage. The single "Star" saw them debut for their new label, 3rd Stone, who released their third album, Love Junky (1995), which also contained the 1995 single "Get Out". The final album of their early years, A Plus de Cent (1996) – which features the French language version of their last single, "Harley Davidson" – was released by Tall Poppy Records.

2012 saw the band resume live performances with six gigs in that year and a further two in 2013. At least four new songs were included in these performances. A three-track 7″ single, "Lovejunky", was released in late 2014, followed by a new album, Pop Fiction, on Matinée Recordings. Soundblab ranked the album at Number 2 on their Top 10 Releases of 2014. Another single, "Still Waiting for the Winter", was also taken from Pop Fiction. The band have continued to tour and record new material, and released the single "So Long" in May 2017, followed in the same year by the album Sugar Kisses.

== Discography ==
=== Albums ===
- Eugenie (1990), Midnight Music
- Snog (1991), Midnight Music
- Love Junky (1995), 3rd Stone
- Pop Fiction (2014), Matinee Recordings
- Sugar Kisses (2017), Matinee Recordings

=== Compilation albums ===
- À Plus de Cent (1996), Tall Poppy
- Another Year, Another Address . . . the Best of the Midnight Years (1996), Cherry Red

=== Compilation appearances ===
- Rough Trade Shops – Indiepop 1 (2004) Rough Trade Shops
- Scared to Get Happy: A Story of Indie-Pop 1980–1989 (2013), Cherry Red

=== Singles and EPs ===
- "Where Do You Go?" (1988), La-Di-Da – flexi-disc split with How Many Beans Make 5?
- "Landslide" (1989), Medium Cool – UK Indie No. 20
- "Waiting for the Winter" (1989), Midnight Music
- "Someone You Love" (1990), Midnight Music
- "Still a World Away" (1991), Midnight Music
- XXX EP (1991), Midnight Music
- Crazy EP (1991), Midnight Music
- "Star" (1994), 3rd Stone
- Get Out EP (1995), 3rd Stone
- "Harley Davidson" (1996), 3rd Stone
- "Lovejunky" (2014), Matinee Recordings
- "Still Waiting for the Winter" (2015), Matinee Recordings
- "So Long" (2017), Matinee Recordings
