= The Capstan Shafts =

Musical project by Dean Wells

The Capstan Shafts is the musical project of American lo-fi artist Dean Wells. He has been releasing material under the Capstan Shafts name since 1999, through various indie labels such as Yellow Mica, Asaurus and Abandoned Love Records. Most of his albums are very cheap (four or five dollars) or even free.

His songs are typically short, ranging in length from 45 seconds to 2 minutes, and feature a full-band sound of guitars, bass and drums, all of which are played by Wells himself. Every Capstan Shafts release to date has been recorded at home, giving the music a fuzzy lo-fi sound similar to bands such as Guided By Voices and The Mountain Goats.

Despite a prolific output of recorded material (his total output amounts to ten EPs and seven full-length albums), Wells has only performed live three times. His recent album Her Versus The Sad Cold Eventually has led to an upsurge in media interest surrounding The Capstan Shafts; the album was given four very favorable reviews on music-news site Pitchfork Media by Matt LeMay of Get Him Eat Him.

== Appearances ==
Dean Wells has also released a song as Vergel Tears, and has three albums under his own name.

On May 2, 2008, Wells opened for The Ruby Suns and Menomena at Middlebury College in Middlebury, VT. His temporary drummer, never having played live, returned from the bar just in time as Dean was about to be forced to start without him.

In 2010 the Capstan Shafts regrouped as a 5-piece band before playing shows across the U.S. east coast. Festivals dates at SXSW and CMJ followed before the band released their first studio LP "Revelation Skirts" for Rainbow Quartz Records.

Recently, National Public Radio chose the Capstan Shafts as one of "5 Artists You Should Have Known in 2010".

== Discography ==
=== Albums ===
- Chick Cigarettes (2004)
- The Sleeved and Granddaughters of the Black List (2005)
- Springboard to the Boxwine Set (2006)
- Eurydice Proudhon (2006)
- The Megafauna Undermined (2006)
- Her Versus the Sad Cold Eventually (2007)
- Dreamilys Throttled Revolts (2007)
- Environ Maiden (2007)
- Fixation Protocols (2008)
- Revelation Skirts (2010)
- Kind Empire (2011)

=== Extended plays ===
- Great Reset Button of Life (2004)
- Seal Cull Rebellion (2004)
- Hopegetswheels (2004)
- Ample Tribes for Sullen King Pounder (2004)
- Her Chapbook Called "Tiny Grey Radio" (2004)
- Unreconstructed Lo-fi Whore (2005)
- The Night Shrine of Well-Groomed Lawns (2005)
- Demon Dog of the American Park Service (2005)
- Halaluah Moancoaxers (2005)
- The Sun Don't Get Things Done (2006)
- Consumption Violets (2007)
- Kid Butane Goes to Greenland (2007)
- A Brace for Hephaestus (2007)
- Bug Tragic (2007)
- Miles Per Famine (2008)
