= The Trolleyvox =

- Origin: Philadelphia, Pennsylvania, U.S.
- Genres: Indie pop
- Years active: 1997–present
- Labels: Groove Disques, Transit of Venus
- Members: Andrew Chalfen; Beth Filla; Owen Biddle; Adam Stranburg
- Website: http://myspace.com/thetrolleyvox

The Trolleyvox is an American Indie pop band from Philadelphia, Pennsylvania. It was formed in 1996 by Andrew Chalfen and Beth Filla.

The band's style drew comparisons to The New Pornographers, while a YouTube video for "Just You Wait" turned it into an anthem against George W. Bush.

After releasing two albums on the New Jersey power-pop label Groove Disques, The Trolleyvox moved to Philadelphia-based label Transit of Venus. Their 2006 release The Trolleyvox Present The Karaoke Meltdowns earned them substantial critical praise, Philadelphia Weekly hailing the album as their best yet. In 2007 the band released a double album Your Secret Safe / Luzerne earning 3.5 stars out of 5 on Allmusic. Your Secret Safe is a full-band album produced by Philadelphia producer Brian McTear (The A-Sides, Matt Pond PA, B.C. Camplight); Luzerne is a mostly acoustic and instrumental album that became a staple on WXPN's Sunday morning broadcast, "Sleepy Hollow."

Bassist Owen Biddle also played in the Philadelphia hip-hop/R&B group The Roots until 2011.

== Discography ==
- Ephemera for the Future (Groove Disques, 2000)
- Leap of Folly (Groove Disques, 2003)
- The Karaoke Meltdowns (Transit of Venus, 2006)
- Luzerne (Transit of Venus, 2007)
- Your Secret Safe (Transit of Venus, 2007)
