= Giselle Bellas =

Cuban-American singer-songwriter

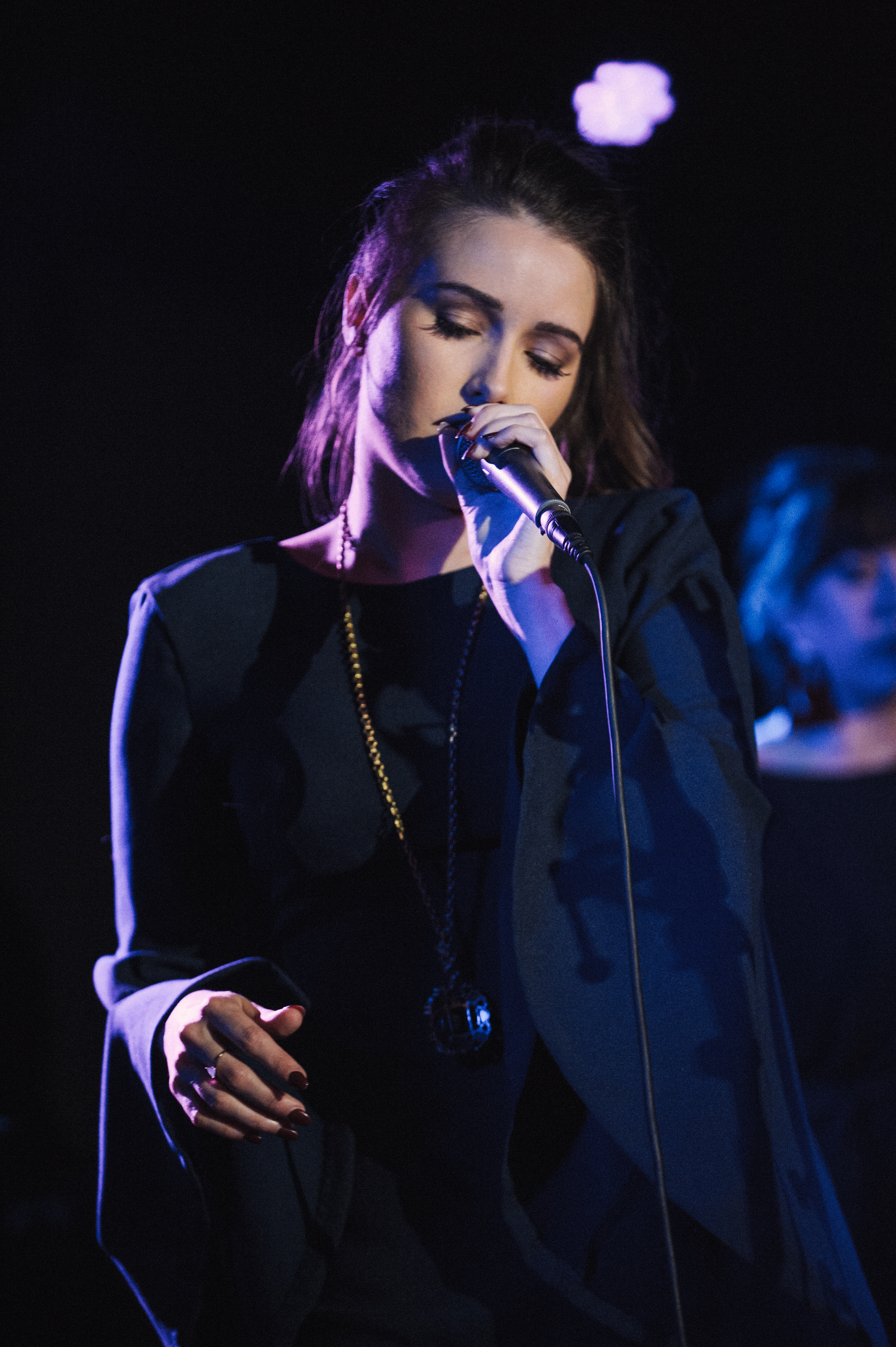

Background information
- Born: Giselle Bellas; Miami, Florida, U.S.
- Genres: indie pop, baroque pop, art pop, alternative
- Occupations: Singer-songwriter, Playwright, Film Director
- Instruments: Vocals, piano, flute
- Years active: 2015–present
- Label: Independent
- Website: www.giselle.us

Giselle Bellas is a Cuban-American singer-songwriter, playwright, and multimedia performer.

== Background ==
Originally from Miami, Florida, Giselle moved to New York City to pursue a singing career. Though classically trained in opera, Giselle's vocal style evolved as she began charting new territories as a songwriter. Inspired by her family's taste in predominantly Latin music, jazz, and oldies, in addition to her own love of classical music and pop music, Giselle began to build a successful music career of her own. Her sound has been called "a combination of the dark ethereal nature of Fiona Apple and the vibrant passion of Florence & The Machine set in a smoky jazz club."

== Career ==
Classically trained, Giselle began her career by recording opera demos for music studios to potentially be used in television and film. Her voice is featured heavily in the Emmy Award winning FX comedy series Louie, most notably the viral "Diarreah Song" which would quickly become an internet hit and receive national praise. After running into pop and indie music producers who encouraged her to release her own original music, Giselle released her debut EP, Change Me in 2016.

In 2017, Giselle released her first full-length album titled Not Ready To Grow Up (stylized as not ready to grow up). Shortly before the album's release, Giselle launched a campaign aiming to hire solely female directors for each music video. The album was well received by critics, and is widely considered her most vulnerable work to date.

Giselle is a staple in the independent music and underground performing arts scene, having opened for big acts such as St. Vincent, Wyclef Jean,, Nick Jonas, and more. In 2023 she announced that she was writing her own original multidisciplinary musical entitled 'The Florence Foster Jenkins Schubertiade Review'; a satirical play inspired by the infamous opera singer Florence Foster Jenkins, written, produced, directed, and starring Bellas. The sold-out premiere of the musical received rave reviews, and Bellas continues to perform the show across the country.

Bellas's first scripted play, 'Impersonators' premiered at Orlando Fringe in January 2026. Set in the 1980s, 'Impersonators' focuses on a dysfunctional Las Vegas couple with a struggling Elvis and Priscilla impersonation act.

Bellas's latest play, 'Miss Bellas' premiered at The Renaissance Theater in Orlando, Florida in May 2026. 'Miss Bellas' follows the titular global icon at the height of her fame and power in a near-future aristocratic dystopia. She lives and performs inside the Wall, an aristocratic haven for the elite. As unrest grows beyond the Wall, her loyal assistant is pressured to make her a symbol of revolution. Torn between memory and survival, they must decide whether Miss Bellas is worth saving or sacrificing. The sold-out play premiered to rave reviews, and was named Best Show of Orlando Fringe 2026.

Bellas's upcoming EP, 'Las Hermanas' is the story of her family escaping post-revolutionary Cuba, recorded in Spanish in traditional salsa and cha-cha.

Bellas continues to record background vocals for artists like Shayfer James.

== Advocacy ==
As a tribute to her grandmother who died from Alzheimer's disease in 2016, Giselle wrote the track, "Hazy Eyes" and has since become an advocate, working closely with Alzheimer's organizations such as Alzheimer's New Jersey and Act Now.

== Discography ==
=== Albums and EPs ===
- Change Me (2016)
- Not Ready to Grow Up (2017)
- Bring the Curtain Down (2020)
- As Dreamers Do (2024)
- Las Hermanas (2026)

== Plays ==
- The Florence Foster Jenkins Schubertiade Review (2023)
- Impersonators (2025)
- Miss Bellas (2026)
- Las Hermanas (2026)

== Filmography ==
- Louie (2015)
- E.ro.sion, noun (2017)
- One Foot in the Grave (2025)
