= The Siddeleys =

English indie pop band

The Siddeleys were a London-based indie pop band, active during the late 1980s. Although they were relatively short-lived, they were influential.

The band formed in 1986, comprising female singer Johnny Johnson, Andrew Brown (bass), Allan Kingdom (guitar), and Phil Goodman (drums). Andy Wake signed the band to his Medium Cool label on the strength of one of their three demo tapes, releasing their first single, "What Went Wrong This Time?" in 1987, described by The Legend in NME as "A gentle teasing lament with cool female vocals and a lilting backing which trickles around the back of the nervous system with deceptive charm". Goodman left in 1987, to be replaced by former Jamie Wednesday and Bob drummer Dean Leggett, who was himself replaced by David Clynch. They moved to Sombrero Records for the follow-up, the John Parish-produced Sunshine Thuggery EP (1988), which caught the ear of John Peel who invited the band to record a session for his BBC Radio 1 programme. Peel commented "the woman who's in charge of the band has a terrific way with words in almost the manner of Morrissey. There are lines in here which make me laugh out loud".

After a second Peel session, they had planned to release "You Get What You Deserve" as a third single, but this fell through when Sombrero ran out of money. The band remained popular with fans of indie pop, and a collection of all of their recordings, Slum Clearance was released in 2001. "What Went Wrong This Time?" was included on the CD86 album, a collection of definitive indie pop compiled by Bob Stanley.

In 2017 Optic nerve records re-released "What Went Wrong This Time" in a limited edition single, on colored vinyl.

== Discography ==
=== Singles ===
- "What Went Wrong This Time?" (1987, Medium Cool)
- Sunshine Thuggery 12" EP (1988, Sombrero)
- Wherever You Go (flexi) (1987, Shalala)
- Sunshine Thuggery 7" EP (2000, Unknown Japanese label)

=== Albums ===
- Slum Clearance (2001, Clarendon/Matinee)

=== Compilation appearances ===
- "Bedlam on the Mezzanine" on Hoopla (1987, La Di Da)
- "Love Grows (Where My Rosemary Goes)" on Alvin Lives (In Leeds) – Anti Poll Tax Trax (1990, Spasm/Midnight Music)
- "Sunshine Thuggery" on The Sound of Leamington Spa (2000, Firestation Towers/TweeNet/Bilberry)
- "What Went Wrong This Time?" on CD86 (2007, Castle)
- "My Favourite Wet Wednesday Afternoon" on Scared to Get Happy: A Story of Indie-Pop 1980-1989 (2013, Cherry Red Records)
