= The Rain (Basingstoke band) =

British indie pop band

The Rain were an English indie pop band from Basingstoke, England, active between 1986 and the early 1990s. They later changed their name to Clark Springs.

== History ==
The band was formed by singer/guitarist Clive Stubbings, bassist Nigel Rivers, later to be replaced by Tony Duckworth (ex-Junk Factory) and drummer Chris Morrell. Their first single, "Tom Paine" was self-released, but caught the ear of Medium Cool Records, who signed them up. They contributed two tracks, "Dry The Rain" and "Seven Red Apples" to Medium Cool's Edge of The Road compilation album, but their first single for the label, "First Of May" never saw the light of day due to the collapse of Medium Cool's distributor, Red Rhino Records.

The band's first album, To The Citadel, was released in 1989, desicribed by Melody Maker as "glorious, honed to cut-glass perfection", and gaining comparison with The Byrds and R.E.M. in Sounds. A 12" EP, "The Watercress Girl" followed in 1991.

They changed their name to Clark Springs, releasing a single, "Talking Kent State" in 1993, and contributing "She Lives By The Castle" to A Tribute To Felt in 1995.

== Discography ==
=== Singles ===
- "Tom Paine" (1985, Jive Alive, JA002)
- "First of May" (1988, Medium Cool) (promos only)
- "The Watercress Girl" (1990, Orangewood)
- "Talking Kent State" (1993, Summershine) (as Clark Springs)

=== Albums ===
- To The Citadel (1990, Orangewood)

=== Compilation appearances ===
- "Dry The Rain" and "Seven Red Apples" on Edge of The Road (1988, Medium Cool)
- "The Money Men" on Imminent 4 (1986, Food)
- "Down Here (demo)" on Zine Cool Flexi (with Zine magazine)
- "First of May" on You Can't Be Loved Forever 2
- "Down Here" on Everlasting
- "She Lives By The Castle" on A Tribute To Felt (1995, Elefant)
