= Fire Through the Window =

South African indie pop rock group

- FTTW at the Splashy Fen Music Festival in 2008

Background information
- Origin: Durban, KwaZulu-Natal, South Africa
- Genres: Indie rock Pop rock
- Years active: 2007–present
- Labels: Witchdoctor Records '07/'08; Sheer Sound '09 Seed; Independent '10; DO IT Records '12
- Members: Sinéad Dennis; Marc De La Querra; Sheldon Yoko; Keagan van Rooyen; Warwick Kay
- Website: www.firethroughthewindow.com

Fire Through the Window (FTTW) is an indie pop rock group hailing from Durban, South Africa. The band was originally formed in late 2006 by couple Marc De La Querra and Sinéad Dennis, however since 2007 Fire Through The Window has performed as a full five-piece band. The band signed to Witchdoctor Records early in 2007 after expressing interest in the band to Shaughn Pieterse, the label manager. He agreed to sign them and assist in production of their debut album. De La Querra wrote all the music and tracked all the instruments (guitar, bass and drums) in the recording studio, while De La Querra and Dennis co-wrote the lyrics and melodies. The album was released nationwide in the 3rd quarter of 2007. The first single "Just Like You Are" was played on radio stations around the country and was also chosen as the official soundtrack for the first ever South African Apple iPod Nano commercial which was broadcast regularly on multiple channels on satellite television over the festive season.

== Discography ==
- Fire Through The Window (self-titled debut album: Witchdoctor Records, 2007)
- HEY! (Sheer Records, 2009)
- All These People Are Golden (Hruki, 2010)

== Singles ==
- "Just Like You Are" was the first single from the band's debut album. The single showed strong commercial success, and was played on radio stations throughout South Africa. The music video for the single was directed by Michelle Hibbert and was featured on the first ever South African Apple iPod Nano commercial in 2007 and 2008
- "Just Like You Are" was also featured on a television campaign for local clothing store Mr Price and the South African Student Life Magazine
- The second single, "Last Week" was banned from South African television due to the video's violent nature
- The band released a cover version of the song Nothing Compares 2 u written in the 1980s by Prince for The Family and recorded by Sinéad O'Connor in 1990
- "Do Do Do" the first single from HEY! was featured on the television campaign for TEVO shox maxi speakers
- "HEY!" from the album HEY! was then chosen for the second Apple iPod Nano commercial in 2009

== Apple iPod Nano commercial ==
Shortly after shooting the music video for "Just Like You Are" it was announced that Apple Inc had chosen the single and the accompanying music video as their song of choice for their new iPod Nano and both the track and video were featured in the nationwide TV commercial for it. The commercial aired on over 60 channels on the satellite television bouquet DSTV during November and December.

== Current members ==
In 2011, the current band line up includes Sinead Dennis on vocals, Marc De La Querra on rhythm guitar and vocals, Sheldon Yoko on drums, Keagan Van Rooyen on bass guitar and Warwick Kay on lead guitar.

Dennis completed a Bachelor of Arts degree at the University of KwaZulu Natal in 2005 where she majored in Drama and Media Communications. She furthered her studies by completing a second undergraduate degree at Vega School of Brand Communications where she majored in multimedia design. She returned to Vega in 2008 to complete her honors degree in strategic brand communications and the following year joined the faculty as a Vega lecturer.

De La Querra also completed his undergraduate degree at Vega School of Brand Communications majoring in copywriting and founded a design agency called Milkbox Media in late 2009.

Yoko currently teaches drum lessons and is enrolled at COPA Campus of Performing Arts. Van Rooyen is completing his architectural degree at the University of KwaZulu Natal and Kay is employed as a graphic designer.

== Festivals ==
- Woodstock 9 (Harrismith)
- Splashyfen (KwaZulu Natal)
- OppiKoppi Wildcard fest (Northam)
- Witchfest (Mooi River)
- Rocking The Daisies (Cape Town)
- Joburg burning 1 (Johannesburg)
- Rocking the Gardens (Johannesburg)
- Joburg burning 2 (Johannesburg)
- Aardklop (Potchefstroom)
- Joburg burning 3 (Johannesburg)
- Oppikoppi Sexy Crooked Teeth (Northham)
- Joburg burning 4 (Johannesburg)
- Synergy Fest (Cape Town)
