= Jackdaw with Crowbar =

Jackdaw With Crowbar : Because you're worth it!
- Origin: Leamington Spa, England
- Years active: 1986–1992, 2007–present
- Label: Ron Johnson
- Members: Timothy Ellis; Adam Sindall; Aitch Bembridge; Paulina Kalwarska
- Past members: David Tibbatts; Dan Morrison; Steve Law; Fran Juckes; Tris King; Andy Guthrie; Alan McCulloch; Andy Grimmer; Wilf Plum; Fergus Durrant; Louis Scheuer; Avery Green
- Website: www.jackdawwithcrowbar.net

Jackdaw with Crowbar is an English multi-media indie band from Leamington Spa. The band was formed in 1985 when Timothy Ellis took a bunch of instrumental recordings to Fergus Durrant to sing on (the introduction of the two was engineered by Simon Farr) The lineup was completed during 1986 as additional musicians and film makers came on board. The whole thing consolidated in 1987, when signed to Ron Johnson Records.

== History ==
Jackdaw with Crowbar's original line-up was Timothy Ellis, Fergus Durrant, Dave Tibbats and Dan Morrison, with Adam Sindall, Steve Law and Fran Juckes making Super 8mm films which were always present in their live performances. This line-up released the band's first three records, Monarchy, Mayhem and Fishpaste, Sink Sank Sunk and Hot Air.

The band contributed to the 1988 compilation album Take Five in aid of the charity Shelter.

In 1991, Jackdaw released Hanging In the Balance, expanding the line-up with Tris King (formerly of Bogshed and later of A Witness), Andy Guthrie, Alan McCulloch (a.k.a. "Wak"), Andy Grimmer, Wilf Plum (Dog Faced Hermans) and Charley 'H' Bembridge (The Selecter).

Jackdaw had two John Peel sessions on 19 May 1987 and 4 October 1987. Jackdaw stopped touring around 1991 or 1992. In 2005, "Fuck America" was released on a compilation CD, Commercially Unfriendly: The Best Of British Underground, on Gott Discs.

A few people left in 1993 leaving just Ellis and King who wrote new material under the name Jackdaw, embarking on a further tour of Italy hosted by long time co-facilitator Marco Pustinaz.

In 2007, Ellis and Sindall started working together and Jackdaw was re-hatched with Fergus Durrant re-joining soon after. With all new films and songs, Jackdaw released a new EP available from Hybrid Cuts as well as the 12" vinyl EP Barking. The 8mm films were replaced by digital projections via lap tops. The trio continued until 2015 when Durrant left leaving a duo again! Jackdaw received air play on BBC Radio 6 in Stuart Maconie's Freak Zone and Don Letts' show. They continue to air on Radio 6 via multiple DJ's.#

Jackdaw with Crowbar, carried on with Ellis and Sindall and in 2018, formally entered into its sixth age with a re-brand adding 'Because You're Worth It' as the band slogan. For a short time Louis Scheuer on keyboard and Avery Green on guitar joined in. Things reverted back to a duo when Louis went to do his own thing, and Avery won the Royal Blood Scholarship to go off and study music at Water Bears in Brighton. The pair 'carry on regardless' playing shows where ever they can to who ever will have them.

Things continue until phase seven starts in 2024 when Ellis and Sindall are joined by Paulina Kalwarska, visual artist. In a quest to enrich the audience experience further they now present visual treats in addition to the musical multimedia show. Also Aitch Bembridge is back on percussion when he's not busy with The Selecter. (Tammy Woodrow was also onboard for the ultimate benefit gig for Leamington LAMP which featured Stewart Lee and the Belgrade Theatre in Coventry)

== Musical style ==
The band's musical style was described by the musician and writer John Robb as a combination of "spiky and dark guitar-driven blues and guitar-punk disco-filth". Discussing the first EP, Monarchy, Mayhem, and Fishpaste, the writer John Corbett described the music as "a song sung through a bull horn ("Crow"), an accordion reggae-dub ("Fourth World"), a two-step featuring slide guitar reminiscent of Zoot Horn Rollo in Captain Beefheart's Magic Band ("The Night Albania Fell on Alabama")." In Corbett's view, "the brief appearance of Jackdaw's records exemplifies the local-mode commodity at both its most appealing and its most politically volatile". Back then a signature element in the music was the sound of slide guitar. Ellis was known for his haphazard construction of the instruments using found timbers e.g. the first slide guitars in use by both Ellis and Durrant were made out of gate posts. In addition the band took on a kind of symmetry on stage through the use of gate post slide guitars on ironing boards, identical Selmer Twin combo's and similar goat beards.

Recently, Ellis has adopted electronic instruments for his music, including a home-made slide guitar. As well as the political study, a comedic approach can be seen in both the music and lyrical content, with Sindall embracing the idea of front man with drama, costume and writhe.

== Discography ==
Year	Title	Label	Catalogue	Format
1987	Monarchy Mayhem and Fishpaste	Ron Johnson Records	ZRON24	12-inch single
1987	Sink Sank Sunk	Ron Johnson Records	ZRON31	12-inch single
1988	Hot Air	Ron Johnson Records	ZRON33	LP
1989	First After Epiphany	Ron Johnson Records	ZRON36	LP
1991	Hanging in the Balance	HAX Turino	HAX04	LP
2010	EP200	Hybrid Cuts	069CDEP200	CD EP
