= CD86 (album) =

Compilation album
- Released: 2006
- Genre: Indie pop Post-punk; Indie rock
- Label: Sanctuary

CD86: 48 Tracks from the Birth of Indie Pop is a compilation album of artists from the original C86 era, released in 2006 by Sanctuary Records. It is compiled by Bob Stanley of Saint Etienne.

To coincide with its release, the Institute of Contemporary Arts hosted "C86 - Still Doing It For Fun", an exhibition and two nights of gigs celebrating the rise of British independent music.

== Background ==
Released in 1986, the original compilation album C86 became very influential, and is today credited as the birth of indie pop. Stanley notes: "It was the beginning of indie music. It's hard to remember how underground guitar music and fanzines were in the mid-'80s. DIY ethics and any residual punk attitudes were in isolated pockets around the country, and the C86 comp and gigs brought them together". For the original's twentieth anniversary in 2006, Stanley compiled the set of songs that was released as CD86.

== Description ==
CD86 is inspired by C86. Only three of the songs on C86 appear on CD86; fifteen of the original groups on C86 have alternative tracks on CD86. Several tracks were little-known before the album's release.

== Reception ==
Professional ratings
Review scores
| Source | Rating |
|---|---|
| AllMusic | 4/5 stars |
| Pitchfork | 6.8/10 |
| Prefix magazine | 8.0/10 |

Writing in Prefix magazine, Greg Ingber gave the compilation a good review, noting that over twenty years the songs have stood the test of time very well. Ingber argues that while some may see C86 as not much more than a footnote in pop history, the CD86 compilation demonstrates that the scene was more than that. Nitsuh Abebe disapproved of the revised track-list, saying that "Stanley's set actually runs the risk of convincing old indie-pop kids that the music they spent their youths on wasn't that great." Abebe felt that the later compilation's choices were too narrow in terms of genre, and criticized Stanley for not including more of the tracks included on the original C86. Nick Hasted was similarly ambivalent, noting that the revised compilation would never have the influence of the original. Both Hasted and Abebe recognized, however, that CD86 contained numerous good songs.

== Track listing ==
There are 48 tracks on 2 CDs.

=== Disc 1 ===
1. "Velocity Girl" – Primal Scream
2. "The Sun, a Small Star" – The Servants
3. "Around and Around" – Hurrah!
4. "Why Does the Rain?" – The Loft
5. "Vibrato" – East Village
6. "Pristine Christine" – The Sea Urchins
7. "What Went Wrong This Time" – The Siddeleys
8. "Anorak City" – Another Sunny Day
9. "Get Out of My Dream" – Clouds
10. "Golden Shower" – The Boy Hairdressers
11. "Ask Johnny Dee" – The Chesterfields
12. "He Blows In" – The Raw Herbs
13. "Paul McCartney" – Laugh
14. "You Didn't Love Me Then" – The Hit Parade
15. "Like Frankie Lymon" – The Weather Prophets
16. "Sunday to Saturday" – The June Brides
17. "I Had an Excellent Dream" – The Dentists
18. "Everybody Knows the Monkey" – Mighty Mighty
19. "E102" – BMX Bandits
20. "Talulah Gosh" – Talulah Gosh
21. "Cut Me Deep" – The Jasmine Minks
22. "I'll Still Be There" – Razorcuts
23. "Therese" – The Bodines
24. "Paradise Estate" – Television Personalities

=== Disc 2 ===
1. "Upside Down" – The Jesus and Mary Chain
2. "Really Stupid" – The Primitives
3. "It Always Rains on Sunday" – The Groove Farm
4. "Black Country Chainsaw Massacre" – Pop Will Eat Itself
5. "Come Get Me" – 14 Iced Bears
6. "Sign on the Line" – Fizzbombs
7. "Anti-Midas Touch" – The Wolfhounds
8. "This Boy Can Wait" – The Wedding Present
9. "Bible of the Beats" – Age Of Chance
10. "Safety Net" – The Shop Assistants
11. "Just Too Bloody Stupid" – Close Lobsters
12. "Dukla Prague Away Kit" – Half Man Half Biscuit
13. "Don't Slip Up" – Meat Whiplash
14. "I Could Be in Heaven" – The Flatmates
15. "If I Said" – The Darling Buds
16. "Poised Over the Pause Button" – This Poison
17. "Jack and Julian" – The Bachelor Pad
18. "On Tape" – The Pooh Sticks
19. "Flowers Are in The Sky" – Revolving Paint Dream
20. "Whole Wide World" – The Soup Dragons
21. "Frans Hals" – McCarthy
22. "Like an Angel" – The Mighty Lemon Drops
23. "Why Popstars Can't Dance" – Big Flame
24. "Baby Honey" – The Pastels
