= A Witness =

English post-punk/indie rock band

- Origin: Stockport, England
- Genres: Post-punk, indie rock
- Years active: 1982–1989; 2013–present
- Labels: Ron Johnson, Communion, Vinyl Drip, Strange Fruit Records, Euphonium
- Members: Alan Brown (guitar); Crayola (vocals); Rob Haynes (drums); Vince Hunt (bass); Christine Hunt (violin)
- Past members: Rick Aitken (1956–1989); Triss King (1966–2008); Keith Curtis; Noel Kilbride
- Website: https://www.facebook.com/awitnessofficial

A Witness are an English post-punk/indie rock band, who were originally active in the mid-1980s alternative music scene. Their first EP Loudhailer Songs brought them to the attention of BBC Radio 1 disc jockey John Peel, for whom they recorded four sessions. Their career was brought to a halt with the death of guitarist Rick Aitken in 1989. Founder member and songwriter Vince Hunt revived the band with a new line-up for a series of UK-wide dates in 2014 marking the 25th anniversary of Aitken's death, and the band continues to play live.

== Career ==
A Witness were formed in 1982 in Stockport, Greater Manchester, England, by Rick Aitken (guitar), Vince Hunt (bass) and a drum machine, in 1986 replaced by Alan Brown (ex-Big Flame). Keith Curtis (vocals) and Noel Kilbride (guitar) joined the group in 1983.

Initially signing to the Ron Johnson label, debut EP Loudhailer Songs won praise from the NME. A review of the EP in Sounds described it as "pop music perfectly perverted". They gained further attention due to the inclusion of the track "Sharpened Sticks" on the NME's C86 cassette in the following year.

Debut album I Am John's Pancreas followed in October 1986, entering the NME charts and reaching a position of number 18. After a tour of Germany and Holland with Ron Johnson labelmates Big Flame, A Witness recruited multi-instrumentalist Alan Brown on drums. He also contributed arrangement and songwriting ideas, including co-writing final single '(I Love You) Mr Disposable Razors'. With Brown on drums A Witness released a further two 12" singles on Ron Johnson (one each in 1987 and 1988) before its collapse. Communion issued the US-only Sacred Cow Heart compilation in 1988.

When Brown moved on to launch his solo project The Great Leap Forward, he was replaced on by Tris King, who had worked with Hebden Bridge-based outfit Bogshed. King recorded the studio versions of the band's final single '(I Love You) Mr Disposable Razors' and played on the final A Witness gigs when the band were rehearsing mostly in Liverpool, where he lived.

However the group split after the death of guitarist Rick Aitken aged 33 in a climbing accident in Scotland in October 1989, just before a UK tour supporting The Wedding Present. After Aitken's death, the band choose to rather than continue. The third and fourth A Witness BBC radio sessions for John Peel were collected on an album (The Peel Sessions), and a single "I Love You Mr. Disposable Razors" which had been due for release at the time of Aitken's death was delayed so it could be dedicated to him. The single was issued in November 1989 on the Vinyl Drip label. The Imaginary compilation series Through the Looking Glass 1966 included their cover version of The Beatles' "Tomorrow Never Knows" and Through The Looking Glass 1967 compilation (1990) included their cover of The Doors' track "Break on Through (To the Other Side)".

== Post break-up ==
Keith Curtis went on to play guitar for John Robb's Membranes and bass in Goldblade. Vince Hunt recorded three critically acclaimed soundscape albums as Pure Sound; Pure Sound (Yukon (2006), Submarine (2007), and Acts of New Noise (2008), then converted the band into a live unit featuring Harry Stafford (keyboards, Inca Babies), Rob Haynes (drums, Goldblade) and Boz Hayward (guitar, HoundGod). The band released a fourth album in June 2010 called 'Life Under Glass'. Hunt was also a founder member of Marshall Smith in 1997, with Alan Brown from Big Flame and former Pram drummer Daren Garratt, recording a debut album 'Colours'. Hunt joined the Inca Babies in 2009 replacing the late Bill Marten and played on the albums 'Death Message Blues' (2010), 'Deep Dark Blue' (2012) and 'The Stereo Plan' (2014). In 2016 he joined Martin Bramah's Blue Orchids performing live and making his recording debut on two songs on the B-side of the 'Skull Jam' 10" single released in 2017.

A retrospective, Threaphurst Lane, was issued on Overground Records in 2002, while 2006 saw the reissue of I Am John's Pancreas for the first time on CD on Hunt's own Euphonium label.

== Paris concert footage ==
In September 2011, footage of A Witness in concert in Paris recorded 25 years earlier was uploaded to YouTube. The concert – from December 1986 – featured five tracks, two from the album I Am John's Pancreas. "Sharpened Sticks" was included on the NME's collection C-86 and "The Loudhailer Song" was part of a collection of tracks from the period included in a compilation Death To Trad Rock, accompanying John Robb's 2010 book.

The three other tracks – "Nodding Dog Moustache", "Faglane Morris Wind" and "Raw Patch" – formed the bulk of the following A Witness 12" single One Foot in the Groove, their 1988 final release with Ron Johnson.

== The Oberhausen tapes ==
A chance meeting between German A Witness fan Wolfgang Kunst and bassist Vince Hunt at an Inca Babies gig at the 12-Bar venue in London in 2011 led to previously unknown footage of A Witness emerging. Kunst had been in the audience for a concert featuring A Witness and Big Flame at the Oberhausen Old Daddy venue on 9 September 1986 and later ordered from the local record shop a VHS copy of a video featuring four new UK bands: A Witness, Big Flame, Age of Chance and The Wedding Present. In a subsequent conversation in 2012, he offered to send the VHS to Hunt, who had it digitised and uploaded to YouTube in January 2013.

The footage features six songs from the album I Am John's Pancreas which was released on Ron Johnson Records just weeks after the show. The songs are "Smelt Like a Pedestrian", "O'Grady's Dream", "The Loudhailer Song", "Sharpened Sticks", "Red Snake" and "Hard Day's Love". There are also performances of "Camera" and "Lucky in London" (from the November 1984 EP Loudhailer Songs, their first release for the Ron Johnson label). This was the first live footage to emerge of "Lucky in London", "O'Grady's Dream", "Red Snake" and "Hard Day's Love", some of the group's best-known songs.

The line-up of the band for this show is Rick Aitken (guitar), Vince Hunt (bass) and Keith Curtis (vocals) with a Drumatix 606 drum machine. Hunt later sold the Drumatix 606 to John Robb, who owned it as of December 2012.

== Reformation with new line-up ==
To mark the 25th anniversary of the death of guitarist Rick Aitken, founder member Vince Hunt assembled a new line-up of the band to perform some live dates. One-time drummer Alan Brown replaced Aitken and singer Simon 'Crayola' Williams (of the group Sarandon) took over vocal duties from Keith Curtis. Goldblade and Inca Babies drummer Rob Haynes joined the line-up with Vince Hunt remaining on bass. The band's first live show was in London in April 2014 with art punk veterans The Cravats. Appearances at the launch of the re-released NME C-86 album in London and dates across the UK followed, including performing at the Blackthorn Music Festival in Etherow Park in Stockport, where the memorial trees for Rick Aitken were planted, and a 2014 tribute to John Peel featuring a host of Peel-era bands, including The Nightingales, Blue Orchids, Inca Babies, The Wolfhounds and Ted Chippington. For appearances in Stockport and Manchester, Hunt brought in his sister, Christine, who had recorded violin parts for the track "O'Grady's Dream" on the I am John's Pancreas album, but had never performed live with the band.

== Discography ==
=== Studio albums ===
- I Am John's Pancreas (1986, Ron Johnson, LP, ZRON 12) (2006, Euphonium, CD, EUPH001) UK Indie No. 18
  - "Smelt Like A Pedestrian", "O'Grady's Dream", "Car Skidding", "Red Snake", "Dipping Bird", "Sharpened Sticks", "The Loudhailer Song", "Legs Be Sturdy", "4.49 Stool", "Hard Days' Love"

=== EPs and singles ===
- "Loudhailer Songs" (Nov. 1984, Ron Johnson, 12", ZRON 5) UK Indie No. 9
  - "Lucky in London ", "Camera", "Kitchen Sink Drama", "Regular Round" "Drill One"
- "Red Snake" (1987, Ron Johnson, 12", ZRON26)
  - "Red Snake", "Regular Round", "Hard Days' Love"
- "One Foot in the Groove" (May 1988, Ron Johnson, 12", ZRON 30)
  - "Nodding Dog Moustache", "Faglane Morris Wind", "Zip Up", "Raw Patch"
- "I Love You, Mr. Disposable Razors" (Nov. 1989, Vinyl Drip, 12", SUK 010)
  - "I Love You, Mr Disposable Razors", "Disposable dance version", "Tomorrow Never Knows"

=== Compilation albums ===
- Sacred Cow Heart (1986, Communion, LP/C, COMM003/C)
  - "Smelt Like A Pedestrian", "Red Snake", "Dipping Bird", "Sharpened Sticks", "Legs Be Sturdy", "Hard Days Love", "Faglane Morris Wind", "Nodding Dog Moustache", "Raw Patch", "The Loudhailer Song". (Some of these songs were from their second John Peel Session). Extra tracks for cassette only: "O'Grady's Dream", "Smelt Like A Pedestrian 2", "Sharpened Sticks 2", "Hard Day's Love 2".
- Threaphurst Lane: The Best Of A Witness (2002, Overground, CD, OVERVPCD88)
  - "Sharpened Sticks", "I Love You, Mr Disposable Razors", "Tomorrow Never Knows", "O'Grady's Dream", "The Loudhailer Song", "Car Skidding", "Dipping Bird", "Lucky In London", "Hard Days' Love", "4.49 Stool", "Smelt Like A Pedestrian", "Faglane Morris Wind", "Nodding Dog Moustache", "Red Snake", "Zip Up", "Threaphurst Lane", "Tomorrow Never Knows", "Dudefield".
- The Peel Sessions (1989, Strange Fruit, LP/CD, SFPMA 206)
  - "I Love You Mr Disposable Razors", "Life – The Final Frontier", "Helicopter Tealeaf", "Prince Microwave Bollard", "Take Me To The Earth", "McManus Octaphone", "Sunbed Sentimental", "Zip Up"
