= Twang (disambiguation) =

Twang is the sound of a resonating string, or, by extension, a nasal vocal resonation.

Twang may also refer to:

== Music ==
- Twang!: A Tribute to Hank Marvin & the Shadows
- Twang!! a 1965 British musical by Lionel Bart
- The Twang, an indie rock band formed in 2003 from Tipton, England
- Twang (album), an album by George Strait
  - "Twang" (song), the album's title track
- Twang (band), a 1980s indie band from Manchester and Preston, England

== Other uses ==
- Twang (magazine), a Vanity Fair take on country music whose director of photography is Nancy Lee Andrews
- Twang, a monkey who played bass guitar in Animal Kwackers
- TWANG, the Toolkit for Weighting and Analysis of Nonequivalent Groups, developed by the statistics group of the RAND Corporation, contains a set of functions to support causal modeling of observational data through the estimation and evaluation of propensity score weights.

== See also ==
- Tawang (disambiguation)
