= Neil Taylor (journalist) =

English music journalist

Neil Taylor (born 1959), is a former English music journalist. He was born in Sutton Coldfield, West Midlands, and worked for music magazine the NME from approximately 1983 to 1987. Taylor is most closely associated with the "Indie" rock of that period. His early work on such bands as The Jesus & Mary Chain, the Wedding Present, Primal Scream, Bogshed, Big Flame, We've Got A Fuzzbox... and others helped cement the fledgling indie scene in 1984 and 1985, culminating in the release of the NME cassette tape C86. His influence on the paper at this time was such that he was once lampooned in a Ray Lowry cartoon for his indie stance. Taylor’s journalism from this period focused on documenting emerging independent music scenes and bands, contributing to broader recognition of the UK indie movement during the middle 1980s.

In the early 1990s, he went to work in publishing, eventually becoming the Publishing Director of Weidenfeld & Nicolson, part of the Orion Publishing Group, before leaving to set up a literary agency, taylormilnerassociates. During his publishing career he has commissioned and/or edited a number of eminent British literary authors, including Lawrence Norfolk, Jake Arnott, Matt Thorne, David Mitchell, Peter Ackroyd, Justin Hill, Toby Litt, and Tibor Fischer.

== Bibliography ==
- Document and Eyewitness: An Intimate History of Rough Trade (Orion, 2010 ISBN 978-0752853581
