= 1936, The Spanish Revolution =

EP by the Ex
- Released: 1986
- Recorded: Emma's Koeienverhuurbedrijf, Amsterdam, Netherlands
- Genre: Anarcho punk Post-punk; Spanish folk music
- Length: 14:38
- Label: Ex Records; Ron Johnson Records; AK Press
- Producer: Dolf Planteijdt.

The Ex chronology
Pokkeherrie (1985)	1936, The Spanish Revolution (1986)	Too Many Cowboys (1989)

1936, The Spanish Revolution is an album of songs and archival photographs related to the Spanish Civil War, recorded and assembled by Dutch anarchist punk band the Ex. The band released it in 1986, the 50th anniversary of the Spanish Revolution of 1936, on their own label as a square 7 in (18 cm) soft-cover book with two 45 rpm records. A 5 in (13 cm) hardcover edition was republished by AK press in 1997, replacing the records with a pair of 3-inch CDs.

== Background and book ==
In 1936 two Spanish anarchist trade unions, the CNT and the FAI, waged war against Francisco Franco's nationalist troops siding with Spain's legitimate republican government, until Franco defeated the republican army in 1939 with the help of fascist German and Italian troops. With further involvement from the Soviet Union, France, Mexico and Portugal, the conflict is widely regarded as a prelude to World War II. In wanting to highlight the original values and spirit of the revolution rather than the conflict and eventual defeat of anarchist forces, The Ex compiled 144 pages of previously unpublished photographs taken by journalists aligned with the revolutionary forces, along with several short essays about the revolution. Text appears in both English and Spanish.

At the time Dutch publishing house Raket & Lont were compiling a book of comics and essays about the Spanish Civil War and has unearthed the CNT's archives at Amsterdam's International Institute for Social History. The archives had been smuggled out of Spain in 1937 and arrived in Amsterdam by way of England, but had languished in obscurity for five decades due to a post-revolutionary factionism among the CNT's former members. Dutch cartoonist Johannes van der Weert, formerly of the communist punk band The Rondos, arranged for members of The Ex to visit the archive and then to publish the photos, highlighting the revolution from the perspective of anarchist achievement rather than the war and defeat under fire by Axis forces.

== Music ==
For the audio component of the album, The Ex recorded four tracks at Koeienverhuur Studios and invited van der Weert to contribute vocals. Two are Spanish language songs with music and lyrics originally sung by 1930s Spanish revolutionary forces and supporters. On the flip side of each single was an English language song about the revolution, one assembled from lines borrowed from other Spanish revolutionary songs, the other quoted an interview with a campesino recorded in Ronald Fraser's book, Blood Of Spain.

== Release ==
The Ex contacted British label Ron Johnson Records about releasing the album. The band hand-assembled the covers in the Netherlands before shipping it to England for finishing. In order to keep the album affordable, the label offered it to distributors below its actual cost, voluntarily losing money on it in order for it to reach more people. For its 1986 release, commemorating the 50th anniversary of the Spanish Revolution, the music appeared on two 7" singles that sandwiched the album of 144 photos. Following its release The Ex toured with van der Weert on second vocals, playing all over Europe with British band The Membranes and developing a collaboration with the anarchist band Chumbawamba, leading to the material that would comprise The Ex's next album, Too Many Cowboys.

In 1997 The Ex rereleased 1936: The Spanish Revolution as a five-inch square hardback book in tandem with Scottish/American publisher AK Press, this time issuing the double single as a pair of mini-CDs. Later the band issued the music tracks digitally for streaming and download, along with the bulk of their back catalog, via Bandcamp.

== Reception ==
Professional ratings
Review scores
Source	Rating
AllMusic	3/5 stars
Tom Hull	B+

1936 was the first of The Ex's releases to gain some notoriety outside of the Netherlands, selling enough copies to reach No. 6 on the UK Indie Chart. The website AllMusic later called the book a "powerful and enlightening visual document that casts a fresh light on a major historical event little understood in the United States," and said that The Ex's music "find them inviting the spirit of the revolution as if it occurred five minutes ago, not 50 years past."

== Track listing ==
1. "They Shall Not Pass" - 3:47
2. "El Tren Blindado" - 3:06
3. "Ay Carmela" - 3:13
4. "People Again" - 4:30

== Musicians ==
The Ex:

- Luc (bass, guitar, backing vocals)
- Katrin (drums, hand-clapping, backing vocals)
- Terrie (guitars, hand-clapping, backing vocals)
- G.W. Sok (vocals)

Guest musicians:

- John (vocals, hand-clapping, backing vocals).
- Dolf Planteijdt (guitar, hand-clapping)
- Cobie (hand-clapping, backing vocals).

== Notes ==
- Cogan, Brian. Encyclopedia of Punk Music and Culture. Westport, Conn.: Greenwood Press, 2006. p. 70. ISBN 978-0-313-33340-8.
- Mount, Heather. "Three Looks into The Ex". In Crane, Larry. Tape Op: The Book about Creative Music Recording, Volume 2. Milwaukee: Hal Leonard Corporation, 2010. pp. 230–233.
- Robbins, Ira A., ed. The Trouser Press Guide to '90s Rock: The all-new 5th edition of The Trouser Press Record Guide. New York: Simon & Schuster, 1997. ISBN 0684814374.
- Sok, G.W. A Mix of Bricks & Valentines: Lyrics 1979–2009. New York: PM Press, 2011.
- Temporary Services. Group Work. New York: Printed Matter, March 2007.
