= Inca Babies =

British rock band

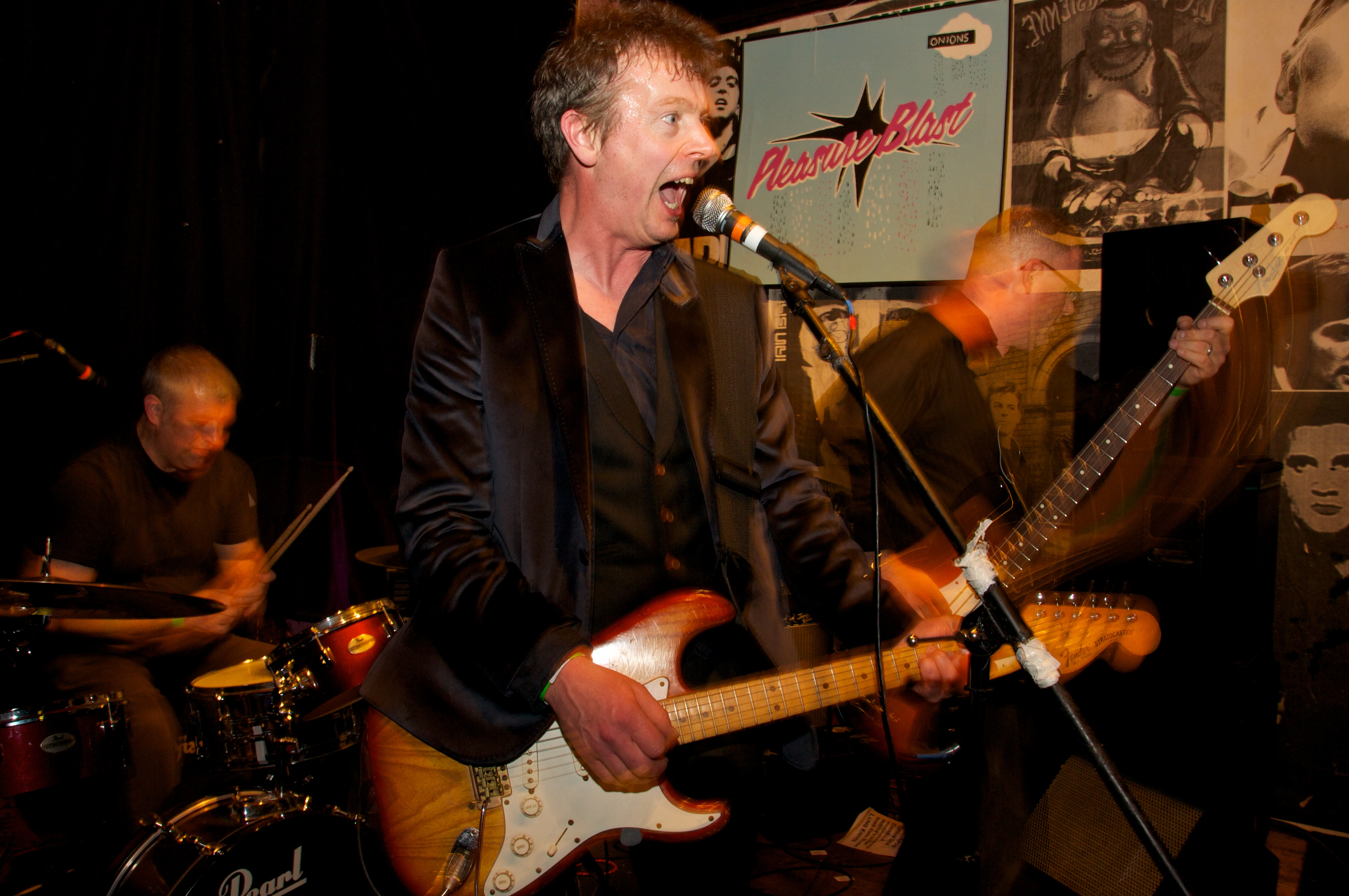
- Inca Babies (2012)

Background information
- Origin: Manchester, England
- Genres: Post-punk, punk blues
- Years active: 1982–1988, 2011–present
- Labels: Black Lagoon, Constrictor
- Members: Harry Stafford (guitar, vocals); Rob Haynes (drums); David Carmichael (bass); Jim Adama (Guitar)
- Past members: Pete Bogg; Clint Boon; Alan Brown; Tony Clarke; Simon Hinson Mike Keeble; Mike Louis; Bill Marten (1960–2008); Johnny Scarles; Harry Stafford; Julian Worapay Vince Hunt
- Website: incababies.co.uk

Inca Babies are an English rock band from Manchester, initially active between 1982 and 1988, reforming in 2007 featuring founder member and original songwriter Harry Stafford (guitars, vocals). With a line-up of Rob Haynes (drums) David Carmichael (bass) and Jim Adama (Guitar) the Inca Babies have released further albums and continue to tour extensively in the UK and Europe.

== History ==
The band was formed in Hulme, Manchester by Bill Marten (aka William Bonney) (bass), Harry Stafford (guitar) Julian Woropay (vocals) and Alan Brown (drums), taking influences from Link Wray, The Cramps, The Gun Club and The Birthday Party. The band's debut single "The Interior" was released in November 1983 on their own Black Lagoon label. Woropay left and Brown went on to form Big Flame and The Great Leap Forward. They were replaced by Mike Keeble (vocals) and Pete Bogg (drums). This new line-up released a debut album Rumble in 1985. Over the next five years they released a further six singles and four albums with several changes of line-up, 1988's Evil Hour featuring Clint Boon of Inspiral Carpets on keyboards.

The band recorded four sessions for John Peel's BBC Radio 1 programme between 1984 and 1987.

However the band folded in the late 1980s shortly after the release of Evil Hour. Stafford and Marten went on to form new outfit Houndgod With A Tumour and released the album Autograph My CIA Assassination Manual in 1989. The Inca Babies reformed for a concert in Munich in 2007 marking the 20th anniversary of the booking agency IBD. The Inca Babies had been the agency's first overseas act when it began. The Munich performance stimulated interest in the band and founder member Harry Stafford recruited Gold Blade drummer Rob Haynes to join full-time.

The death of original bass player Bill Marten in 2008 came as Stafford was writing material for the band's first new album release in two decades. Former A Witness bassist and longstanding friend Vince Hunt stood in to complete the album and for dates across Europe in late 2009 and 2010.

A double A-side blue vinyl 7" limited edition single "My Sick Suburb/Tower of Babel" was released by Black Lagoon Records to mark Record Store Day on 21 April 2012. The songs comment on the notorious Hulme Crescent flats in Manchester which were a centre of the city's counterculture in the 1980s and home to the band's early line-up. An accompanying video was uploaded to YouTube, filmed and edited by film-maker and musician Boz Hayward (at )

Throughout 2012, the band made live appearances across the UK and Europe, performing in Italy, Poland and The Netherlands and also flying to Los Angeles for a one-off show.

In October 2012, the band released a CD titled Re-Peeled to mark their inclusion in a Manchester musical tribute to BBC DJ John Peel. This featured re-recordings of four songs originally recorded for sessions for John Peel's BBC Radio One show in the early 1980s.

The second album from the Hunt/Haynes/Stafford line-up, Deep Dark Blue, was released in November 2012 and the band toured widely in 2013 to promote it, performing live across the UK and at festivals and concerts in Greece, Italy, Belgium, Poland, the UK, Russia and USA, including at the 'Drop Dead' festival in Vilnius, Lithuania.

In 2014, the vinyl-only 12" EP Scatter was released to mark the resurgence of interest in vinyl records on Record Store Day and the band released their third album since 2007, The Stereo Plan. Following a launch party in Manchester the Inca Babies performed for the first time in Russia, headlining the Deathcave 2014 festival in Saint Petersburg and Moscow, and also appeared at the Saarang global culture festival at IIT Chennai, India, in January 2015.

Following The Stereo Plan, Harry Stafford started work on a solo album while Rob Haynes toured extensively with The Membranes and Vince Hunt joined Martin Bramah's Blue Orchids. In August 2017 Inca Babies performed at Blackpool's Rebellion festival and also in Naples, Italy.

The Covid pandemic interrupted the band's musical activity, but a new 10-track Inca Babies album Swamp Street Soul was recorded at Simon 'Ding' Archer's 6 dB studios in Salford, Manchester during the lockdown of 2020–21. It was released on Black Lagoon in November 2021, together with a new single Walk in the Park video at plus a download-only re-recording of 1980s-era songs Crawling Garage Gasoline and Grunt Cadillac Hotel.

In November 2021 the band made several live performances to celebrate the life of BBC DJ John Peel and continue to be active.

In 2024, Inca Babies released their ninth studio album, Ghost Mechanic Nine on Black Lagoon Records BLRCD0060. The album consists of a new collection of tunes with a sound that is rawer and spikier, and reminiscent of their early days in the 1980s.

Reincarnation (2025) features re-recorded and remixed versions of some of their back catalogue.

"Looking through our back catalogue, it occurred to me that there were tracks that should again be made available in some manner and others that would benefit from reinvention. Last year's Ghost Mechanic Nine album was an opportunity to create new music for our fans, who would like this music in the form of digital downloads and, for the truly hardcore, as a 12” Vinyl Album," says Harry Stafford. Candy Mountain originally released in 1986 on the album 'This Train' was released as a single in September 2025.

== Discography ==
All on Black Lagoon unless stated. Chart positions shown from the UK Indie Chart.

=== Albums ===
- Rumble (1985) (#3)
- This Train (1986)
- Opium Den mini-LP (1987)
- Evil Hour (1988)
- 1983–87 – Plutonium (2006) Anagram
- Death Message Blues (2010) Black Lagoon
- Deep Dark Blue (2012) Black Lagoon (BL0049)
- The Stereo Plan (2014) Black Lagoon (BL0051)
- Swamp Street Soul (2021) Black Lagoon (BL0056)
- Ghost Mechanic Nine (2024) Black lagoon (BL0060)
- Reincarnation (2025) Black lagoon (BL0061)

=== Singles and EPs ===
- The Interior (1983)
- Grunt Cadillac (1984) (#6)
- Big Jugular EP (1984) (#13)
- The Judge (1984) (#8)
- Surfin' in Locustland EP (1985) (#11)
- Splatter Ballistics Cop (1986) (#24)
- Buster's on Fire (1987) Constrictor
- My Sick Suburb'/Tower of Babel (2012) Black Lagoon
- Re-Peeled CD EP: Brother Rat/Daniella/The Depths/She Mercenary (Black Lagoon BL0050)
- Scatter EP (2014) Black Lagoon (limited edition clear vinyl)
- Panthers/Devil in My Room (2015) Black Lagoon (Limited Edition on 7" red vinyl)
- Walk in the Park (2021) Black Lagoon
- Crawling Garage Gasoline / Grunt Cadillac Hotel (2021) Download-only issue through Bandcamp.
- Spacewalk (2024) Black lagoon Download-only issue through Bandcamp.
- Ghost Mechanic 9 (2024) Black Lagoon Download-only issue through Bandcamp.
- Candy Mountain (2025) Black lagoon Download-only issue through Bandcamp.
- Two Rails to Nowhere (2025) Black lagoon Download-only issue through Bandcamp.

=== DVD and video appearances ===
- Blood on the Cats (VHS)
- Jerico in In Goth Daze – The Gothic Video (DVD) (2003) Cherry Red
