= The Great Leap Forward (band) =

English band

- Origin: Manchester, England
- Years active: 1987–1990, 2008–present
- Labels: Ron Johnson, Communications Unique
- Members: Alan Brown, Richie Dempsey, Anthony Chapman
- Past members: Jon Sargeant, Eileen Cox, Maureen Cox, Simon Williams
- Website: www.thegreatleapforward.net

The Great Leap Forward is a band formed by former Big Flame member Alan Brown, when his previous band split up in 1986. After several releases the project was put on hold in 1990, but revived in 2008 with subsequent album releases in 2008, 2012 and 2021.

== History ==
The Great Leap Forward is essentially Brown's solo project, with friends / musicians added for live performances. The sound is more melodic and accessible than his earlier band bIG fLAME, but still with overtly political lyrics.

After two EPs (which were described by the NME as "conspicuously excellent") and a 12-inch single on Ron Johnson Records, that label's collapse led to a move to Communications Unique for debut album Don't Be Afraid Of Change in 1988, which The Guardian described as Brown meeting "the advent of the synthesizer ethic head-on". Manchester publication Up Town described it as "the most definitive Manchester release this year...pop shimmering down urban lanes, sprinkling hard dance diatribes, infectious melodies, and lyrics with substance". Ian Gittins, writing in Melody Maker, described it as "full of wordy thoughts on the state of this nation set to an infectious, chirpy dance beat". Simon Williams, reviewing the album for the NME gave it 8/10, stating "at least half of [it] is damn near astonishing".

A 12-inch single, "Heart and Soul", was followed by the LP compilation Season 87-88 which largely comprised tracks from the three Ron Johnson singles, and the CD compilation Great Leap Forward, before Brown put the project on hold in early 1990. A mini-LP, Tolerance & Respect had been planned for a Spring 1990 release but was shelved.

Stuart Maconie, writing for NME, summed up the band's late 1980s sound: "First there's the jagged guitar melodics, sweet but never tacky. Then there's the ferocious rhythmic drive. But best of all there's the stylish and witty use of found voices...snatches and snippets of speech and propaganda that are integral to the songs."

James Dean Bradfield included the debut Great Leap Forward EP in his top 10 favourites from the 'C86' era.

In October 2008, Brown revived The Great Leap Forward and released a CD of new material, Finished Unfinished Business, followed in 2012 by a further CD album This Is Our Decade of Living Cheaply and Getting By. In Spring 2021, Brown released his most recent album Revolt Against an Age of Plenty on both vinyl and CD on A Turntable Friend Records.

Between 2007 and 2014 Brown also played bass in Sarandon, and guitar in a reformed A Witness (for whom he also was the first drummer in 1987/88) although both these bands have since ceased to perform.

From 2008 to 2021 live performances by The Great Leap Forward were exceedingly rare, performed either as a two-piece (over backing-tracks with Brown on guitar and Simon Williams (Sarandon) on bass), or Brown playing solo acoustic sets.

However, in 2025, Brown recruited experienced musicians Richie Dempsey (Stretchheads. Desalvo (band), Dawson) on drums and Anthony Chapman (Collapsed Lung (band), Arndales) on bass & electronic organisation, with The Great Leap Forward playing live again from February 2026 onwards.

The Great Leap Forward recorded two sessions for John Peel's BBC Radio 1 show, in May 1987 and January 1988. - these are now due to be released on vinyl by Precious Recordings of London in October 2026.

== Discography ==
=== Albums ===
- Don't Be Afraid Of Change... (1988), Communications Unique
- Finished Unfinished Business (2008), Communications Unique
- This Is Our Decade Of Living Cheaply And Getting By (2012), Communications Unique
- Revolt Against An Age Of Plenty (2021), A Turntable Friend / Communications Unique
- The Great Leap Forward - Peel sessions 08.06.87-08.02.88 (2026), Precious Recordings of London

Compilations

- Season 87–88 (1988), Communications Unique
- Great Leap Forward (1990), Communications Unique

=== Singles, EPs ===
- Controlling The Edges Of Tone (1987), Ron Johnson
- A Peck on the Cheek À La Politiqué (1988), Ron Johnson
- "Who Works the Weather?" (1988), Ron Johnson
- Heart and Soul (1989), Communications Unique

=== Tracks on other compilations / formats ===
- Bereavement Of Speech (flexidisc 1987), No Idea fanzine
- Friction (flexidisc 1989 ), Getout fanzine
- (When It's) Cold In Summer on Commercially Unfriendly (CD, 2005), Gott Discs
- My Grandfather's Cluck on C87 (CD, 2016), Cherry Red Records
- Who Works The Weather? on C88 (CD, 2017), Cherry Red Records
- A Peck On The Cheek À La Politique on Manchester North Of England (CD, 2017), Cherry Red Records
