= Too Many Cowboys =

Live album by The Ex
- Released: 1987
- Recorded: Partly live and partly at Emma's Koeienverhuurbedrijf, Amsterdam.
- Genre: Anarcho-punk
- Length: 75:00
- Label: Ex Records (Netherlands); Ron Johnson Records (U.K.); Mordam Records (U.S.)
- Producer: Dolf Planteijdt

The Ex chronology
1936, The Spanish Revolution (1986)	Too Many Cowboys (1987)	Aural Guerrilla (1988)

Too Many Cowboys is the second double-album Dutch anarchist punk band The Ex. Released in 1987, it mixes live and studio recordings and marks the band's beginning of a collaboration with British anarchist group Chumbawamba.

== Background ==
In 1986 The Ex added former Rondos vocalist/cartoonist Johannes van der Weert as a back-up singer and booked a European tour with British group The Membranes. Gigs were recorded by The Ex's sound engineer Dolf Planteijdt and mixed with material recorded in the studio to comprise the songs for Too Many Cowboys. In addition to material not available on any other Ex release, the album contains live versions of songs previously found on the band's double-single/book about the Spanish Civil War and from their then-forthcoming Peel Sessions compilation album, as well as a cover versions of songs by seminal communist Dutch punks The Rondos and contemporary British anarcho-punks Chumbawamba, with whom The Ex were beginning to collaborate.

== Release ==
Too Many Cowboys came out as a double-LP in a gatefold sleeve with all of its materials hand assembles and packaged by the band. The band chose to highlight the international do-it-yourself movement with a full spread 24-page newspaper stuffed with articles about music, counterculture, and politics from perspectives excluded by mainstream media. These included diverse stories about independent radio-stations, alternative media, small record labels, volunteer movements to build schools in El Salvadorian villages, the fight to end Apartheid, and the censorship trial against Jello Biafra and the Dead Kennedys. Van der Weert contributed artwork to additional poster inserts, the 36-page lyric book, and a stylized postcard from the band. A single-sided bonus flexodisc featured poet Nico Van Apeldoorn offering a spoken word report on events surrounding the recent death of a squatter held captive in a Dutch jail.

Too Many Cowboys was the first of The Ex's records to be issued simultaneously in multiple countries and receive wider international distribution, seeing release on the band's own Ex Records in the Netherlands, by Ron Johnson Records in England, by Mordam Records in the United States, and by Di-Di Records in Greece. The Ex reissued Too Many Cowboys (minus one song and Van Apeldoorn's report) on a single CD in 1993 and launched it, along with the bulk of their back catalog, for streaming and download via Bandcamp.

== Track listing ==
1. "Red + Black" - 5:47
2. "White Shirts" - 3:53
3. "Adversit" (Chumbawamba cover) - 0:30
4. "People Again" - 4:12
5. "Knock" - 2:46
6. "Hands Up! You're Free" - 3:06
7. "Ignorance" - 2:54
8. "Butter or Bombs" - 4:11
9. "Dumbo" - 3:18
10. "How Can One Sell the Air" - 5:46
11. "Business as Usual" - 5:56
12. "Olympigs" - 4:19
13. "Choice" - 2:58
14. "A Job" - 2:40
15. "Stupid" - 6:32
16. "Oops" - 5:04
17. "No Fear" - 1:19
18. "Vivisection" (The Rondos cover) - 6:37
19. "A Piece of Paper" - 3:28
20. "They Shall Not Pass" 3:48
21. "Pigjump" (vinyl only)
22. "Wie Vermoordde Hans K.?" (bonus flexi-disc issued with the original double LP)

== Personnel and recording ==
- Terrie (guitar)
- G.W. Sok (vocals)
- Luc (bass)
- John (vocals)
- Katrin (drums)

On "Wie Vermoordde Hans K.?":

- Nico Van Apeldoorn (lyrics)
- Beat Cornaz (guitar)
- Kees Van Der Haak (saxophone)

Recorded partly live and partly at Emma's Koeienverhuurbedrijf, Amsterdam, Netherlands. Produced by Dolf Planteijdt.

== Notes ==
- Cogan, Brian. Encyclopedia of Punk Music and Culture. Westport, Conn.: Greenwood Press, 2006. p. 70. ISBN 978-0-313-33340-8.
- Mount, Heather. "Three Looks into The Ex". In Crane, Larry. Tape Op: The Book about Creative Music Recording, Volume 2. Milwaukee: Hal Leonard Corporation, 2010. pp. 230–233.
- Robbins, Ira A., ed. The Trouser Press Guide to '90s Rock: The all-new 5th edition of The Trouser Press Record Guide. New York: Simon & Schuster, 1997. ISBN 0684814374.
- Sok, G.W. A Mix of Bricks & Valentines: Lyrics 1979–2009. New York: PM Press, 2011.
- Temporary Services. Group Work. New York: Printed Matter, March 2007.
