= Stretchheads =

Scottish punk band

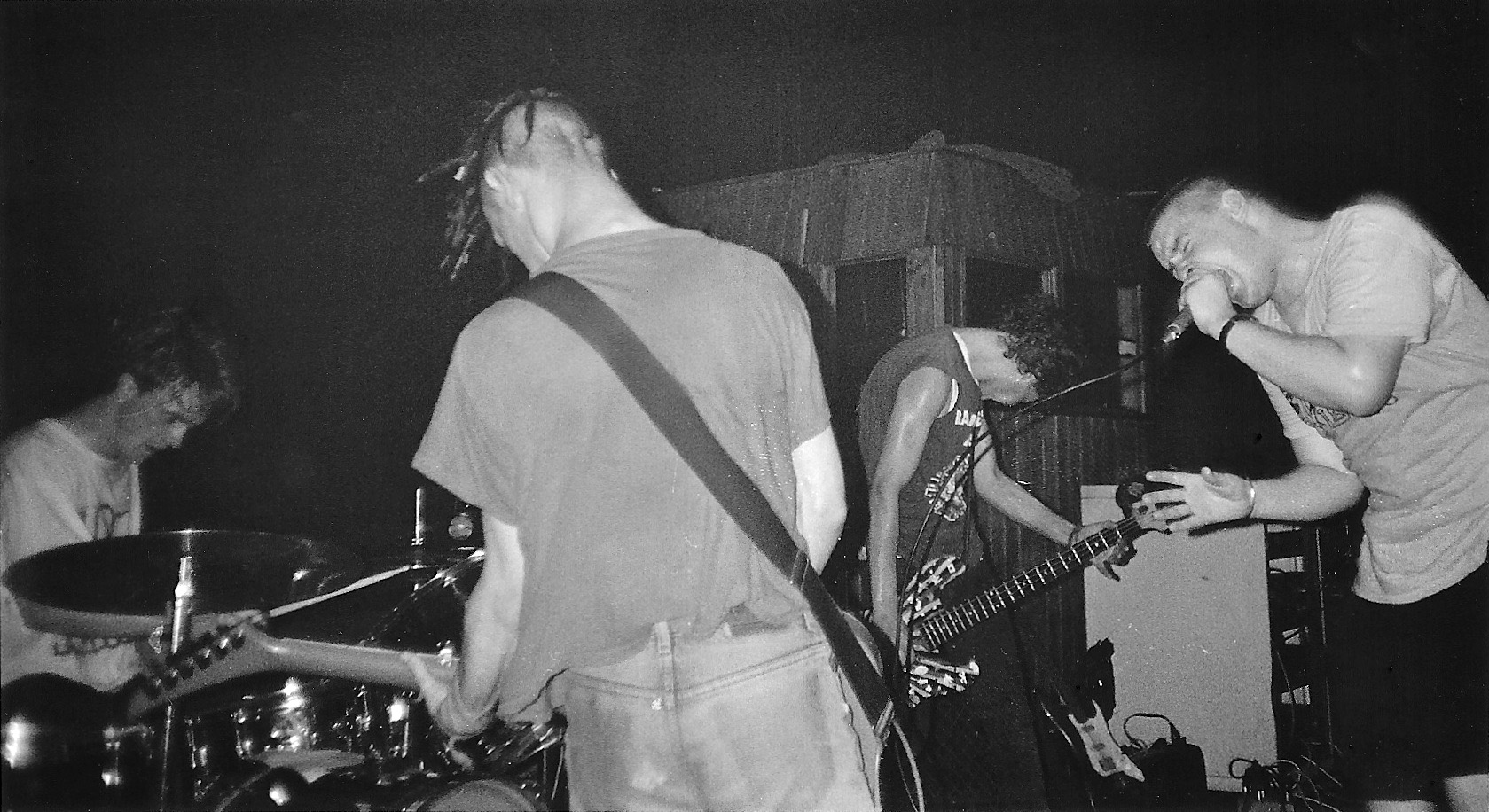
- Stretchheads (1991).

Background information
- Origin: Erskine, Renfrewshire, Scotland, United Kingdom
- Genres: Noise rock, punk rock, hardcore punk, art punk, experimental rock
- Years active: 1987–1991
- Labels: Blast First, Moksha Recordings
- Past members: Phil Eaglesham "Wilberforce / P6"; Andy MacDonald "Dr. Technology"; Steven MacDougall "Mofungo Diggs"; Richie Dempsey; Jason Boyce "Mr. Jason"

Stretchheads were a British punk/noise rock band from Erskine, Scotland. Active between 1987 and 1991, they released two albums in that period.

== History ==
The band was formed in 1987 by Andy Maconald (aka "Dr. Technology", guitar), P6 (aka "Fat Bastard", "Wilberforce", real name Phil Eaglesham, vocals), with the line-up completed by Mofungo Diggs (Steven MacDougall, bass) and Richie Dempsey (drums). The band wore asbestos firewear, gas masks, flashy shirts and balaclavas on stage, and blossomed after support slots with the Happy Mondays, The Wonderstuff and The Shamen. They began their recording career on the Moksha Recordings label with the Bros are Pish EP, poking fun at then chart-toppers Bros, among others. This resulted in discussion in a Smash Hits interview, with Craig explaining to the Goss brothers what 'Pish' Meant. Their debut album, Five Fingers, Four Thingers, a Thumb, a Facelift and a New Identity followed in 1989. Dempsey departed to join Dawson, and was replaced by Mr. Jason (Jason Boyce) of the Dandilion Adventure, and the band were signed up by top indie label Blast First. Their first release on Blast First was the 1990 EP Eyeball Origami Aftermath Wit Vegetarian Leg. A further single, 23 Skinner, followed in January 1991 before their second album was issued, Pish in Your Sleazebag. Touring Europe and playing shows with Dutch band Revenge of the Carrots and old colleagues Dog Faced Hermans, the band split up in 1992, before which they recorded a session for John Peel's BBC Radio 1 show. Two years later, their last, posthumous, release was the Barbed Anal Exciter EP.

Phil Eaglesham and Richie Dempsey went on to be members of DeSalvo, along with Allan Stewart of Idlewild and Alex Grant, formerly of Idlewild. The band released their debut album on Mogwai's Rock Action Records in 2008. Phil Eaglesham continues to perform with Joe Ahmed of The Chekists as 'Security' and has recorded several solo and collaborative performance art releases on his Naloxone Sounds cassette label, including a Stretchheads retrospective box set. Richie Dempsey has rejoined former Dawson members in the band Sumshapes and continues to record, perform and sound engineer.

== Musical style ==
Musically, Stretchheads were influenced by both the US independent hardcore of Butthole Surfers, Killdozer and British indie bands such as Big Flame and Bogshed, and attempted to take the sound of those bands to a new extreme. They have also been compared to the Japanese noise rock of the Boredoms and Ruins. P6's vocals have been described as "inhuman, reminiscent of nothing so much as Sesame Street's Grover with electrodes affixed to his genitals", with their music described as "the weirdest, fastest and heaviest thing ever to come cartwheeling out of the British Isles".

== Discography ==
=== Albums ===
- Five Fingers, Four Thingers, a Thumb, a Facelift and a New Identity (1989) Moksha Recordings (1,000 copies)
- Pish In Your Sleazebag (1991) Blast First

=== Singles and EPs ===
- Bros Are Pish Etched 7" EP (1988) Moksha Recordings (500 copies)
- Eyeball Origami Aftermath Wit Vegetarian Leg 7" EP (1990) Blast First
- "23 Skinner (Have a Bang on This Number)" 12" (1991) Blast First
- Barbed Anal Exciter 10" EP (1,000 copies) (1993) Blast First

=== Other rarities ===
- 'Three Steps to Heaven' – Cassette EP (1987) (50 copies)
- 'Asylum Suck' – A Pox on the Poll Tax Compilation LP (1988) (Revolt)
- 'Collectivisation of Breasts In Moscow' – Media Pack (1989) (3 copies)
- 'Groin Death' & '3 Pottery Owls' on Pathological Compilation 1989
- 'Spanish Castle Magic' on 'If 6 Was 9' Hendrix Tribute (1989)(Imaginary)
- 'Jimi's Magic Spanish Castle (Live)' – Flexi, Catalogue Magazine 1989
- 'Manic Depression (Live) – Flexi, Ablaze! Magazine 1989
- 'Born to Be Wild (In the Style Of Bogshed)' – Unreleased Steppenwolf Tribute 1989 (Imaginary)
- 'Eyeball Origami Aftermath Wit Vegetarian Leg' VHS Promo 1990
- John Peel Radio Session, BBC June 1991
- P6 Lyric Booklet – Ltd Edition of 23, 1998
