= The Noseflutes =

- Origin: Birmingham, England
- Genres: Awkward, angular Indie Rock
- Years active: 1980–1991
- Labels: Reflex, Rictus Recordings, Ron Johnson
- Members: Chris Horton; John Horton; Chris Long; Martin Longley; Dave Pritchard; Martin Rowson; Ron Collins; Trevor Lines; Roger Turner

The Noseflutes were an unorthodox, late-eighties band based in Birmingham. They released three EPs and three albums, recorded four sessions for Radio 1's John Peel, and received generally favourable reviews from the contemporary music press. Their second album, Zib Zob and His Kib Kob, made The People newspaper's list of The 101 Most Awful Album Titles of All Time. During their existence they became "the house band for Birmingham".

== History ==
The band was formed in 1980 and both the band and the members went through several names before settling on the Noseflutes (previous names include The Blaggards, the Cream Dervishes, Extroverts in a Vacuum, The Viable Sloths, Pantaloni Brothers, and Shitstormer). The band's first releases were on Reflex Records, home to The Very Things and And Also the Trees. Reflex issued the band's first EP, Girth, in 1985, and the debut album Several Young Men Ignite Hardboard Stump the following year. They then moved on to Ron Johnson Records, who issued the band's next two EPs, The Ravers (tracks from the band's 1986 Peel session) and Heartache is Irresistible. When Ron Johnson ceased to operate, the band continued with their own Rictus Recordings label, releasing the albums Zib Zob and his Kib Kob and Mellow Throated in 1989 and 1991 respectively, before splitting up.

The band were described by the Birmingham Mail as a "wonderfully perverse avant weird outfit".

Singer Martin Longley and bassist Chris Horton formed a new band, The Clicking Stick, along with Paul McKenna, releasing the album Mocrophone in 2001. Dave Pritchard and John Horton released two albums under the names Acme Spring Company and Cubans Dials in the early 1990s. Chris Long recorded under his stage name of Legs Akimbo, with Nick Duffy of The Lilac Time.

In late 2010 many of the original members of the Noseflutes were performing as The Crimplene Explosion.

== Members ==
- Chris Horton – bass guitar, keyboards, guitar
- John Horton – guitar, bass guitar, keyboards
- Chris Long (aka Legs Akimbo) – keyboards, violin, guitar
- Martin Longley – vocals, saxophone, trombone
- Dave Pritchard – guitar, bass guitar
- Mark Rowson – drums, percussion, keyboards
- Ron Collins – drums, percussion
- Trevor Lines – drums, percussion, bass guitar
- Roger Turner – drums and percussion

== Discography ==
=== EPs ===
- Girth (12", 1985, Reflex, UK)
- The Ravers (12", 1986, Ron Johnson, UK)
- Heartache Is Irresistible (12", 1987, Ron Johnson, UK)

=== Albums ===
- Several Young Men Ignite Hardboard Stump (LP, 1986, Reflex, UK)
- Zib Zob And His Kib Kob (LP, 1989, Rictus Recordings, UK)
- Mellow Throated (LP, 1991, Rictus Recordings, UK)

=== Compilation appearances ===
- A Reflex Compilation (LP, 1985, Reflex): "Past Promise Broken in a Previous Life"
- Hits and Corruption (LP, 1986, Hits $ Corruption): "Holidaytime"
- The First After Epiphany (LP, 1987, Ron Johnson): "Bodyhair Up in the Air"
- Year One – The Best of Premonition Tapes (So Far) (cassette, 1988, Premonition Tapes): "Leg Full of Alcohol (Live)"
- Commercially Unfriendly (CD, 2005, Gott Discs): "Give Me The Keys"
