= Sanctuary Records =

British record label

Sanctuary Records Group Ltd.
- Parent company: BMG Rights Management
- Founded: 1979
- Founder: Rod Smallwood, Andy Taylor
- Defunct: 2007
- Distributors: Universal Music Group (physical); BMG Rights Management (digital)
- Genre: Various
- Country of origin: United Kingdom

Sanctuary Records Group Limited was a record label based in the United Kingdom and is, as of 2013, a subsidiary of BMG Rights Management solely for reissues. Until June 2007, it was the largest independent record label in the UK and the largest music management company in the world. It was also the world's largest independent owner of music intellectual property rights, with over 160,000 songs.

== History ==
The company was formed in 1979 by Rod Smallwood and Andy Taylor, who met as undergraduates at Trinity College, Cambridge. In 1979, they discovered Iron Maiden in a London pub and went on to manage the group. They named the record company after the band's song "Sanctuary," which was released as a single in 1980, and later included on American pressings as well as the reissued CD version of their 1980 eponymous debut album.

Sanctuary Records has historically signed artists that they consider to have long-term appeal.

Between 1989 and 1991, Sanctuary was co-owned by the Zomba Group, whose music publishing arm still held the music of Iron Maiden in 2001.

In 1994, the company diversified. Amongst the new media interests included a joint venture with screenwriter and producer, Raymond Thompson, which evolved into the Cloud9 Screen Entertainment Group.

Iron Maiden's catalogue was reissued by Sanctuary in conjunction with Columbia Records in the US in 2002.

Kenny Rogers' 1980s catalogue (originally released on RCA Records) was reissued by Sanctuary's Castle Music label in conjunction with Rogers' Dreamcatcher Records in the UK. The albums were only available as imports in the US. Rogers' 2003 release Back to the Well was released by Sanctuary in the UK.

Mayan Records was an imprint of Sanctuary Records, under which Lordi's album The Monster Show was released.

Sanctuary's notable twentieth anniversary release of CD86: 48 Tracks from the Birth of Indie Pop, was released in 2006; it is a reissue of the pivotal UK independent compilation C86.

The company incurred significant losses in its 2004 and 2005 fiscal years. Sanctuary's losses in 2005 increased to £142.6m from £26.7m in 2004. In October 2005, the company announced that one quarter of its staff, representing 175 positions, would be eliminated. One such layoff was John Kalodner, senior vice-president of A&R, with over thirty years of industry experience.

The company partly blamed the loss increase on record release delays, while announcing, in early 2006, a £110m rescue deal. These events, plus pressure from the UK financial and business leaders, led to Smallwood becoming merely a general manager of the company, Taylor becoming Chief Executive and former British Airways chief executive Bob Ayling being installed as the new chairman. On 26 May 2006, Ayling dismissed Taylor, following a review of accounting practices prompted by inquiries from the Financial Reporting Review Panel. The board's publicly stated reason for the dismissal was "that certain of the prior year adjustments made in the 2005 accounts should have been presented as a correction of fundamental errors and not as changes in accounting policy". Taylor was replaced by Frank Presland, the chief executive of Sanctuary-owned Twenty-First Artists Management.

In July 2006, it was reported that MAMA, the management group behind the Kaiser Chiefs and Franz Ferdinand and headed by Mean Fiddler chief Dean James, had bid for the group. This proved unsuccessful, further depressing the share value of the company. In late 2006, Rod Smallwood left the company, taking with him Iron Maiden's management interests.

In April 2007, Billboard reported that Sanctuary Records would cease to exist as a new release label in the US that summer, though catalogue, licensing, and new media operations would continue. On 15 June 2007 Universal Music Group announced it had reached an agreement to buy Sanctuary Records for £44.5 million. The agreement was completed in October 2007. By December 2007, it appeared that the Sanctuary name had begun to be phased out, with both Morrissey and Robert Plant being transferred to the Universal-owned Decca Music Group and Iron Maiden to Universal Music Enterprises (with distribution by Sony Music Entertainment, a successor to Sanctuary and Columbia's distribution partnership for the band's releases) for future releases.

On 21 September 2012, regulators approved Universal Music Group's planned acquisition of EMI from Citibank for £1.2 billion. However, due to conditions imposed by the European Commission, UMG was required to sell Sanctuary. It was one of the two units of Universal Music, never fully owned by EMI, that were forced to be sold; the other unit was V2 Records. BMG Rights Management acquired Sanctuary for over €46 million. In June 2013, BMG agreed to have INgrooves distribute the label's catalogue in North America, while the PIAS Group would handle international rights; however, Black Sabbath's catalogue remained at Universal until March 2014, when BMG took over the band's distribution. In March 2017, BMG transferred the distribution rights of select Sanctuary artists to Warner Music Group's ADA division.

In 2023, BMG signed a new distribution deal with Universal Music Group, Sanctuary's previous owner.

== Labels catalogue ==
- Castle Communications
- CMC International
- Jet Records (except Electric Light Orchestra, Ozzy Osbourne and Lynsey De Paul)
- Mayan Records
- Neat Records
- Noise Records
- Pye Records (except DJM Records catalogue, property of Universal Music)
- RAS Records
- Trojan Records (except Bob Marley, property of Tuff Gong and JAD Records)
- Urban Records

== Former artists ==
Iron Maiden was one of the last artists signed to Sanctuary, which released their album, The Book of Souls in North America, on 4 September 2015.

- 3 Colours Red
- Aberfeldy
- Allman Brothers Band (Hittin' the Note)
- Marc Almond
- Angelou
- Anthrax
- Apollyon Sun
- The Ataris
- Atomkraft
- Andy Bell
- Belle & Sebastian – Rough Trade Records
- Biohazard
- Bizarre – Urban Division
- Black Sabbath (except the US and Canada)
- Blondie
- Blue Nile
- Blue Öyster Cult
- Blues Traveler
- Brides of Destruction
- Eric Burdon
- The Charlatans – Creole Records
- Corrosion of Conformity
- The Cranberries
- The Damned
- De La Soul – Urban Division
- Deaf School
- Bruce Dickinson
- Rob Dickinson
- Dio
- Discharge
- Peter DiStefano
- Dokken
- DragonForce
- Drowning Pool
- Earth, Wind & Fire – Urban Division
- Emerson, Lake & Palmer (label outside the US, Canada, and Japan)
- Engerica
- Europe
- Ex Cathedra
- The Fall
- Fun Lovin' Criminals
- Gamma Ray
- The Gathering
- Thea Gilmore
- Gizmachi
- Gorky's Zygotic Mynci
- Gravity Kills
- Adam Green
- Groove Armada
- Helloween
- The Hiss
- Humble Pie
- Idlewild – Pye Records
- Billy Idol
- IllScarlett
- Jane's Addiction
- Jimmy Chamberlin Complex
- JoBoxers
- Jon B. – Urban Division
- Elton John
- Journey
- King Crimson
- The Kinks
- Kiss
- Living Colour
- Lowgold
- Lynyrd Skynyrd
- Manic Street Preachers
- Marillion (US and UK)
- The Marmalade
- The Mavericks
- Christine McVie (except North America)
- Marc Brierley
- Meat Loaf
- Megadeth
- Ministry
- Morrissey – Attack Records
- Alison Moyet
- Ocean Colour Scene
- Sally Oldfield
- Oleander
- Jo O'Meara
- Orange Goblin
- William Orbit
- Dolores O'Riordan
- Kelly Osbourne
- Overkill
- Pet Shop Boys
- Photek
- Pitchshifter
- Robert Plant and the Strange Sensation
- Play
- Alan Price and The Electric Blues Company
- Queensrÿche
- Joey Ramone
- Ray J – Urban Division
- Kenny Rogers
- Rollins Band
- Bruce Ruffin
- The RZA – Urban Division
- Saint Etienne
- Scorpions
- Gene Simmons
- Simple Minds
- Siouxsie and the Banshees
- The Small Faces
- Status Quo
- Stratovarius
- The Strokes – Rough Trade Records (UK only)
- Styx
- Super Furry Animals
- Superjoint Ritual
- Tangerine Dream ("Pink Years" and "Blue Years" albums)
- Tegan and Sara
- Tesla
- Uriah Heep
- Venom
- Virgin Steele
- Vixen – CMC International (US only; Eagle in Europe)
- Ween
- Widespread Panic
- Within Temptation (UK only)
- Wu-Tang Clan – Urban Division
- Neil Young

== See also ==
- Lists of record labels
