= Louder Than War =

Online music magazine

- Website type: Music, news and media
- Available in: English
- Creator: John Robb
- Editor: John Robb
- Website: louderthanwar.com
- Launched: 2010

Louder Than War is a music and culture website and magazine focusing on mainly alternative arts news, reviews and features. The site is an editorially independent publication that was started by the English musician and journalist John Robb in 2010 and is now co-owned by Robb and Nigel Carr and supported by a team of journalists with a worldwide team of freelancers. There was a print edition from 2015 until 2020.

The site is built around live reviews, album reviews and interviews. In 2012, Louder Than War launched a record label to promote and champion lesser known bands and artists.

== History ==
In its first year, in November 2011, Robb was voted to win the UK Association of Independent Music "Indie Champion" award.

Louder Than War created the record label Louder Than War Records in 2014, to act as a platform for bands and artists to reach a wider audience. The first release was Evil Blizzard's The Dangers Remixes, a 300-copy CD-only release without a catalogue number, each being hand numbered; the eight-track release was a remix of the at that point still-to-be-released Evil Blizzard debut, The Dangers of Evil Blizzard (LOUD001). The label has since released material by King Champion Sounds, Faerground Accidents, The Nightingales, Super Besses, Get Your Gun, and The Membranes.

In August 2015, Louder Than War announced they were also creating a print magazine. The first issue of Louder Than War magazine was published by Big Cheese Publishing Ltd in autumn 2015 and followed a similar style and format to the website. Due to the Coronavirus pandemic, it was announced in June 2020 that the magazine was to be put on hiatus.

Sarah Lay became editor in September 2015, with John Robb becoming Editor-in-Chief of the online and offline publications. Lay left in July 2017. The business continues to be run by Robb, Nigel Carr and a team of section editors, journalists and contributors worldwide.

In October 2021, Louder Than War Radio was launched, broadcasting 24/7 on the internet. Inaugural presenters included Nigel Carr, Gordon Rutherford, Brian McCabe, Neil Crud, Nils van der Linden and Audrey Golden.

In March 2026 Carr and Robb launched Louder Than War Live Festival at Manchester Academy, headlined by Sea Power.
