= Foxheads Stalk This Land =

Studio album by Close Lobsters
- Released: 1987
- Recorded: July–August 1987
- Studio: Woodbine St. Recording Studio, Leamington Spa, Warwickshire
- Genre: Jangle pop
- Length: 37:49
- Label: Fire (UK); Enigma (US and Canada); Emergo (Europe); Producciones Twins (Spain)
- Producer: John A. Rivers

Professional ratings
Review scores
Source	Rating
AllMusic	4/5 stars
New Musical Express	5/10
Trouser Press	favourable

Foxheads Stalk This Land is the debut album by Scottish band Close Lobsters, produced by John A. Rivers and released in 1987.

== Track listing ==
1. "Just Too Bloody Stupid" – 3:24
2. "Sewer Pipe Dream" – 3:07
3. "I Kiss the Flowers in Bloom" – 3:27
4. "Pathetique" – 2:38
5. "A Prophecy" – 4:45
6. "In Spite Of These Times" – 3:35
7. "Foxheads" – 2:49
8. "I Take Bribes" – 2:12
9. "Pimps" – 3:47
10. "Mother of God" – 7:55
