= Tawang (disambiguation) =

Tawang is a town and administrative headquarters of the Tawang district in the Indian state of Arunachal Pradesh.

Tawang may also refer to:

- Tawang Monastery, a Tibetan Buddhist monastery in the town, founded by Lodre Gyatso
- Tawang district, administrative district of the Arunachal Pradesh state in northeastern India
- Tawang (state constituency), Kelantan, Malaysia

== See also ==
- Twang (disambiguation)
