= Goldblade =

English punk rock band

Background information
- Origin: Manchester, England
- Genres: Punk rock, hardcore punk, art punk
- Years active: 1996–present
- Labels: Captain Oi!, Ultimate Records, Overground Records (Current May 2013-)
- Members: John Robb; Pete 'Gorgeous' Byrchmore; Keith Curtis; Rob Haynes; Andy Taylor
- Past members: Wayne Simmons; Jay Taylor; Martin Gray; Johny Skullknuckles
- Website: http://www.goldblade.com/

Goldblade are an English punk rock band from Manchester, England. The band formed in early 1995 when ex Membranes frontman, John Robb, put the band together with Wayne Simmons and former Membranes and A Witness vocalist Keith Curtis on bass, Rob Haynes (ex Houndgod and Killing for Pleasure/K.F.P.) on drums and Jay Taylor on guitar.

The band signed to Ultimate Records and released their first single, "Soul Power", before releasing several more singles and two albums - Home Turf (1996/97), and Goldblade Drop the Bomb (1998) before Simmons departed. In 2000, Goldblade recruited a new percussionist, Martin Gray, into the line-up and recorded two singles, "AC/DC" and "Who Was the Killa?", together with a third album Do You Believe In The Power Of Rock 'n' Roll. These recordings released in 2002 on a new label, Twenty Stone Blatt.

In 2001, Jay Taylor left the band to concentrate on his Bonebox project, and two new members Johny Skullknuckles and Pete 'Gorgeous' Byrchmore (ex-Nightingales, and U.K Subs) were recruited to begin work on the next album, Rebel Songs (2004). Second percussionist Gray left shortly after the recording sessions, and the album was released in 2005 on the Captain Oi! label. The band continued gigging and recording as a five-piece, with the next album Mutiny (also on Captain Oi! Records) released in 2008. Both Rebel Songs and Mutiny were also issued internationally.

Goldblade continue to tour extensively. They regularly appear at major UK music festivals, including Glastonbury Festival, Reading Festival, Wickerman Festival and Rebellion Festival, and several smaller ones (Strummercamp). They have played in St Petersburg to 25,000 people, in Serbia and, in early 2010, in Algiers (being one of only a handful of Western bands to do so).

In March 2010, Skullknuckles was replaced by another guitarist, Andy Taylor (no relation to the Duran Duran member.)

In September 2010, Goldblade released a compilation album, Beyond God & Elvis, on Kids-Union Records. The album was exclusive to China, and was accompanied by tour dates in Beijing.

On 20 May 2013 Goldblade released the album The Terror of Modern Life on Overground Records in CD, vinyl and download formats.

Since the release of the 2014 album Acoustic Jukebox, Goldblade's activities have taken a backseat to the reformed Membranes, a band featuring John Robb, Peter Byrchmore and Rob Haynes. They have reunited on several occasions to play festival sets, including two charity shows at Manchester pub the Star & Garter in 2018 and 2019. Both of these shows featured the return of Johny Skullknuckles.

== History ==
Goldblade formed in Manchester in the mid 1990s playing what they called "punk rock hooligan blues", and what was described in The Independent as "a shamelessly fundamentalist collision of The Ramones, James Brown and The Stooges". The band toured a lot and signed to Ultimate Records. Their debut single, "Soul Power", was single of the week in the NME, and their third single "Strictly Hardcore" was a minor UK UK Singles Chart hit. The band's debut album Home Turf was released in 1997 on the Ultimate Records label, produced by multiplatinum producer Gavin Monaghan.

Their second album, Drop the Bomb, was recorded in Brighton at The Levellers' studio, and again released on Ultimate Records (TOPP CD071) in May 1998. The single "Hairstyle" saw an improbable live appearance on children's Saturday morning TV on CD:UK.

Do You Believe in the Power of Rock n' Roll? was released in summer 2002 on the independent label Twenty Stone Blatt Records. The band toured Germany previewing new songs for the album. Guitarist Jay Taylor left shortly after recording, to concentrate on his own band Bonebox. Rebel Songs was released in the UK by Captain Oi! Records (AHOY CD252) in 2005, and in Germany via KB-Records. Mutiny was released in the UK by Captain Oi! Records (AHOY CD305) in September 2008. The album was also released in Germany via KB-Records (KB 037) in a vinyl only edition. "Riot! Riot" was used on the soundtrack for the film Green Street 2: Stand Your Ground. The band's world tour included a stadium gig in Russia and a headline show in Algeria where they were the first western rock band to play the country for 20 years.

The Terror of Modern Life was released by Overground Records] (OVER132) on 20 May 2013, and was followed by the release of an acoustic album, Acoustic Jukebox the following year.

The band went on semi-hiatus after this, while members focused on The Membranes reunion, and the recording of the Membranes albums Dark Matter/Dark Energy, Inner Space/Outer Space, and What Nature Gives/Nature Takes Away, in 2015, 2016 and 2019 respectively. Since 2015, they have intermittently reunited for occasional live shows, most notably the 2018 and 2019 charity gigs F**k Cancer and F**k Cancer 2 in support of Kathy Rocker, owner of Manchester alternative store Rockers, who died in late 2019. These shows saw the return of Johny Skullknuckles in support of Kathy.

== Discography ==
=== Albums ===
- Home Turf (1997, Ultimate)
- Drop the Bomb (1998, Ultimate)
- Do U Believe In The Power of Rock 'n' Roll? (2002, Twenty Stone Blatt)
- Strictly Hardcore (2002, Navena Muzik, Brazil only)
- Strictly Hardcore (2003, Thick Records, USA only)
- Rebel Songs (2005, Captain Oi!)
- Strictly Hardcore - The Best Of Goldblade (2006, Captain Oi!)
- Punk Rockers in the Dance Hall (2006, SOS Records, US only)
- Kiss My Ass (2004, Antrop, Russia only)
- Mutiny (2008, Captain Oi!)
- The Terror of Modern Life (2013, Overground)
- Acoustic Jukebox (2014, Overground)

=== Singles ===
- "Introducing...Goldblade" EP (1996) Ultimate
- "Black Elvis" (1996) Ultimate
- "Strictly Hardcore" (1997) Ultimate - UK Chart No. 64
- "Not Even Jesus" (1997) Ultimate - UK Chart No. 86
- "16 Tons" (1998) Ultimate
- "Hairstyle" (1998) Ultimate
- "AC/DC" (2002) Twenty Stone Blatt
- "Who Was The Killa?" (2002) Twenty Stone Blatt (limited edition)
- "Psycho" (2005) Captain Oi! Records
- "City Of Christmas Ghosts" (2008) Damaged Goods (featuring Poly Styrene)
- "Jukebox Generation" (2008) Captain Oi! (split with Argy Bargy)
- "Riot! Riot!" (2009) KB-Records (Germany) (split with Krawall Bruder)

=== DVDs ===
- Testify! Live (2006) Cherry Red - Recorded live at The Royal Oak, Poulton nr Blackpool, Lancashire late 2005.
