= Mark Tilton =

English screenwriter, filmmaker, actor, and musician

Mark Tilton (born 1962 in Blackpool, Lancashire, England) is an English screenwriter, filmmaker, actor and musician.

Tilton is a frequent collaborator with director George Milton. Their screenplay The Truth, a darkly comic murder-mystery satirising new age therapy, was directed by Milton and features Elizabeth McGovern, Elaine Cassidy and Karl Theobald amongst an ensemble cast.

With Milton, Tilton co-wrote the screenplay for the film A Bullet Wasted, in which a young partisan is forced to choose between executing her Commander or her brother. The film was made as part of the Directors UK / ARRI Challenge Trinity scheme and was shot in a single uninterrupted take using the Arri Trinity. It was directed by Milton and shot by Robbie Ryan (cinematographer). The film won Best Short Film and Best Cinematography at London Independent Film Awards 2019 and Best Short Film at Edinburgh Independent Film Awards 2019.

Infidel, a drama focusing on the subject of Holocaust denial, was awarded Best UK Short Film at the Raindance Film Festival 2009. The film is part of a triptych of shorts, Sins of London, written by Tilton and directed by Milton.

A graduate of the UEA Creative Writing Course, Tilton wrote the libretto for Hell for Leather, a comic film opera composed and directed by Dominik Scherrer. The film won the Prix Action Light at Locarno International Film Festival, and featured in the Sensation exhibition at The Brooklyn Museum in 1999.

Tilton won the Best Actor Award at the 16th Grand Off Film Festival in Warsaw, Poland in December 2022 for his lead role in Guillaume Doucet's film Better Men.

In the late 1970s and early 1980s, Tilton was guitarist and singer with the post-punk band The Membranes. He later joined Marc Riley as guitarist in The Creepers. He returned to performing music in 2013, fronting his band Black Crack.
