= The Shrubs =

English rock group

- Also known as: The Kevin Staples Band
- Origin: Watford, England
- Genres: Rock, post-punk
- Years active: 1985 – 1988
- Labels: Ron Johnson, Public Domain
- Past members: Nick Hobbs (1985–88); Julian Hutton (1985–88); Mick Ricketts (1985–88); John Bentley (1985–88); Phil Roberts (1985–86); Steve Brockway (1986); Mark Grebby (1986–88)

The Shrubs were an English rock music group, formed in Watford in 1985, releasing three albums before splitting up in 1989.

== History ==
Future Shrubs singer Nick Hobbs had previously managed Henry Cow, co-founded Recommended Records with Chris Cutler, and lived in Stockholm for a year as erstwhile singer for the Swedish band Kraeldjursanstalten (later Kropparna). When that band split, he relocated to London and looked for a new band. After being sacked from what would become Stump for "being too serious", Hobbs then joined what became The Shrubs, sharing inspiration with Mick Ricketts (guitar), Jon Bentley (drums), Julian Hutton (guitar) and Phil Roberts (bass), from Captain Beefheart, Pere Ubu, The Fall, and later The Ex, initially as The Kevin Staples Band, but changing name to The Shrubs before first release Full Steam into The Brainstorm, a 6-track 12" EP in July 1986 on the Ron Johnson label. Phil Roberts left shortly afterwards to join Marc Riley in The Creepers, to be replaced by Steve Brockway (later with The Ton Ups and The Jack Rubies), and subsequently by Mark Grebby, who had been the bass player for original Ron Johnson artistes Splat!. The band worked with Dutch producer Dolf Planteijdt for nearly all their recordings after Brainstorm, thanks to his work with The Ex.

The Shrubs contributed Bullfighters Bones to the NME's famous C86 album, and Edith to Cherry Red Records' follow up C87. The band's last recording was a song called Latin Mills that appeared on a vinyl compilation album.

A further 12", Blackmailer followed towards the end of the year, with debut album Take Me Aside for a Midnight Harangue hitting the shops in July 1987. With the collapse of the Ron Johnson label and the indie distribution network The Cartel, several hundred copies of "Harangue" were incinerated, much to Hobbs' annoyance. The Shrubs signed with the Hertfordshire-based Public Domain label for a studio/live 12", Another Age, and second and final album Vessels of the Heart, both in 1988, after which the band split. Hobbs went on to form Mecca, who toured the former Soviet Union with Nitzer Ebb and others, and subsequently Infidel, along with later Pere Ubu guitarist Keith Moliné and Nico's former drummer Graham Dowdall (a.k.a. Dids), at the same time carrying on a parallel career in the music industry. He carries on making music solo and with different groups under the names of Nikolai Galen and Raining Spiderling. He has his own record label Voice of Shade which has released most of the records he's been part of since The Shrubs. As Nikolai Galen, he has an active Soundcloud page.

The band recorded two sessions for John Peel's BBC Radio 1 show, the first in June 1986 and the second in August 1987.

== Discography ==
=== Singles ===
- "Full Steam into The Brainstorm" (Jul 1986, Ron Johnson, ZRON10 [12"])
- "Blackmailer" (Dec 1986, Ron Johnson, ZRON17 [12"])

=== Albums ===
- Take Me Aside for a Midnight Harangue (Jun 1987, Ron Johnson, ZRON23 [LP])
- Another Age/live tracks (Sep 1988, Public Domain, DOM001 [12" mini-LP])
- Vessels of The Heart (Nov 1988, Public Domain, DOM002 [LP])
