= C86 =

Compilation album by various artists
- Released: May 1986
- Genre: Indie pop; jangle pop
- Length: 61:11
- Label: Rough Trade, NME
- Compiler: Neil Taylor, Adrian Thrills, Roy Carr

Various artists chronology
| Pogo A Go Go! (1986) | C86 (1986) | Holiday Romance (1986) |

C86 is a cassette compilation released by the British music magazine NME in 1986, featuring new bands licensed from British independent record labels of the time. As a term, C86 quickly evolved into shorthand for a guitar-based music genre characterized by jangling guitars and melodic power pop song structures, although other musical styles were represented on the tape. In its time, it became a pejorative term for its associations with so-called "shambling" (a John Peel-coined description celebrating the self-conscious primitive approach of some of the music) and underachievement. The C86 scene is now recognised as a pivotal moment for independent music in the UK, as was acknowledged in the subtitle of the compilation's 2006 CD issue: CD86: 48 Tracks from the Birth of Indie Pop. In 2014, the original compilation was reissued in a 3CD expanded edition from Cherry Red Records; the 2014 box-set came with an 11,500-word book of sleevenotes by one of the tape's original curators, former NME journalist Neil Taylor.

The C86 name was a play on the labelling and length of blank compact cassette, commonly C60, C90 and C120, combined with 1986.

== The C86 cassette ==
The tape was a belated follow-up to C81, a more eclectic collection of new bands, released by the NME in 1981 in conjunction with Rough Trade. C86 was similarly designed to reflect the new music scene of the time. It was compiled by NME writers Roy Carr, Neil Taylor and Adrian Thrills, who licensed tracks from labels including Creation, Subway, Probe Plus, Dan Treacy's Dreamworld Records, Jeff Barrett's Head Records, Pink, and Ron Johnson. Readers had to pay for the tape via mail order, although an LP was subsequently released on Rough Trade on 24 November 1986. The UK music press was in this period highly competitive, with four weekly papers documenting new bands and trends. There was a tendency to create and "discover" new musical subgenres artificially in order to heighten reader interest. NME journalists of the period subsequently agreed that C86 was an example of this, but also a byproduct of NME's "hip hop wars" – a schism in the paper (and among readers) between enthusiasts of contemporary progressive black music (for example, by Public Enemy and Mantronix), and fans of guitar-based music, as represented on C86.

NME promoted the tape in conjunction with London's Institute of Contemporary Arts, which staged a week of gigs in July 1986, featuring most of the acts on the compilation.

The tape included tracks by some more abrasive bands atypical of the perceived C86 jangle pop aesthetic: Stump, Bogshed, A Witness, the Mackenzies, Big Flame and the Shrubs.

C86 was the twenty-third NME tape, although its catalogue number was NME022 (C81 had been dubbed COPY001). The rest of the tapes were compilations promoting labels' back catalogues and dedicated to R&B, Northern soul, jazz or reggae. C86 was followed up with a Billie Holiday compilation, Holiday Romance.

== Legacy ==
Professional ratings
Review scores
| Source | Rating |
|---|---|
| AllMusic | 4.5/5 stars |
| Drowned in Sound | (9/10) |
| Stewart Lee | (favourable) |
| The Line of Best Fit | (8/10) |
| Pitchfork | (9.2/10) |
| PopMatters | (7/10) |
| The Quietus | (positive) |

Ex-NME writer Andrew Collins summed up C86 by dubbing it "the most indie thing to have ever existed". Bob Stanley, a Melody Maker journalist in the late 1980s and a founding member of pop band Saint Etienne, similarly said in a 2006 interview that C86 represented:

[the] beginning of indie music... It's hard to remember how underground guitar music and fanzines were in the mid-'80s; DIY ethics and any residual punk attitudes were in isolated pockets around the country and the C86 comp and gigs brought them together in an explosion of new groups.

Martin Whitehead, who ran Subway in the late 1980s, added a new political dimension to the importance of C86. "Before C86, women could only be eye-candy in a band; I think C86 changed that – there were women promoting gigs, writing fanzines and running labels."

Some are more ambivalent about the tape's influence. Everett True, a writer for NME in 1986 under the name "The Legend!", called it "unrepresentative of its times . . . and even unrepresentative of the small narrow strata of music it thought it was representing." Alastair Fitchett, editor of the music site Tangents (and a fan of many of the bands on the tape), takes a polemical line: "(The NME) laid the foundations for the desolate wastelands of what we came to know by that vile term 'Indie'. What more reason do you need to hate it?" The Guardian published an article in 2014 challenging some of the negative assertions about the cassette.

In 2022, journalist Nige Tassell published the book Whatever Happened to the C86 Kids?: An Indie Odyssey, based on interviews with members of all 22 bands that had appeared on the cassette. It outlines the "many and varied paths through life" these musicians took over a period of more than three decades.

The significance of C86 was recognized by several events marking the 20th anniversary of the compilation's release in 2006. Sanctuary Records released CD86, a double-CD set compiled by Bob Stanley. The ICA hosted "C86 - Still Doing It For Fun", an exhibition and two nights of gigs celebrating the rise of British independent music.

Cherry Red's 2014 expanded reissue was marked by an NME C86 show on 14 June 2014 at Venue 229, London W1; acts from the original compilation included The Wedding Present, David Westlake of The Servants, The Wolfhounds and A Witness.

== Other compilations ==
Other record labels, sometimes in collaboration with NME, have, on occasion, released similarly titled albums themed around surrounding years.

| Name | Label | Release date | Reference |
|---|---|---|---|
| C81 | Rough Trade | February 1981 | |
| C85 | Cherry Red Records | 21 October 2021 | |
| CD86 (48 Tracks From The Birth Of Indie Pop) | Sanctuary Records | 23 October 2006 | |
| C86 (Deluxe 3-CD Edition) | Cherry Red Records | 9 June 2014 | |
| C87 | Cherry Red Records | 10 June 2016 | |
| C88 | Cherry Red Records | 30 June 2017 | |
| C89 | Cherry Red Records | 4 August 2018 | |
| C90 | Cherry Red Records | 21 February 2020 | |
| C91 | Cherry Red Records | 21 January 2022 | |
| C92 | Cherry Red Records | 24 January 2025 | |
| C96 | New Musical Express | 1996 | |
| C09 | Rough Trade | 18 April 2009 | |
| C23 | Bose | 16 March 2023 | |
| C24 | Bose | 19 July 2024 | |
| C25 | Bose | 19 September 2025 | |

== Track listing ==
Side one
| No. | Title | Contributing artist | Length |
|---|---|---|---|
| 1. | "Velocity Girl" | Primal Scream | 1:21 |
| 2. | "Happy Head" | The Mighty Lemon Drops | 2:43 |
| 3. | "Pleasantly Surprised" | The Soup Dragons | 2:05 |
| 4. | "Feeling So Strange Again" | The Wolfhounds | 1:42 |
| 5. | "Therese" | The Bodines | 3:03 |
| 6. | "Law" | Mighty Mighty | 3:39 |
| 7. | "Buffalo" | Stump | 4:27 |
| 8. | "Run to the Temple" | Bogshed | 3:30 |
| 9. | "Sharpened Sticks" | A Witness | 2:30 |
| 10. | "Breaking Lines" | The Pastels | 2:58 |
| 11. | "From Now On, This Will Be Your God" | Age of Chance | 3:17 |

Side two
| No. | Title | Contributing artist | Length |
|---|---|---|---|
| 12. | "It's Up to You" | Shop Assistants | 2:36 |
| 13. | "Firestation Towers" | Close Lobsters | 1:46 |
| 14. | "Sport Most Royal" | Miaow | 2:55 |
| 15. | "I Hate Nerys Hughes (From the Heart)" | Half Man Half Biscuit | 3:43 |
| 16. | "Transparent" | The Servants | 2:33 |
| 17. | "Big Jim (There's No Pubs in Heaven)" | The Mackenzies | 2:36 |
| 18. | "New Way (Quick Wash and Brush Up with Liberation Theology)" | Big Flame | 1:38 |
| 19. | "Console Me" | We've Got a Fuzzbox and We're Gonna Use It | 1:25 |
| 20. | "Celestial City" | McCarthy | 3:00 |
| 21. | "Bullfighter's Bones" | The Shrubs | 3:45 |
| 22. | "This Boy Can Wait" | The Wedding Present | 3:59 |

== See also ==
- Fanzine
- Indie rock
- Punk ideologies
- Punk subculture

== External sources ==
- Bladh, Krister Everything went Pop!, C86 and more, A wave and its rise and wake (pdf) 2005
- "Fire Escape Talking","Anoraky in the UK, C86, the punk that refuses to die" ("Fire Escape Talking blog", 7 July 2006)
- Fitchett, Alastair, "C86" (Tangents Blog, 25 July 2005)
