= The Mackenzies =

- Origin: Glasgow, Scotland
- Genres: Indie rock
- Years active: 1985–1987, 2026
- Labels: Ron Johnson, Last Night In Glasgow
- Members: Paul Turnbull; Iain Beveridge; Gary Weir; Peter Gilmour
- Website: www.mackenzies.co

The Mackenzies are a Scottish indie band from Glasgow, Scotland, initially active around 1986/87, who released two singles of jagged indie-funk on Ron Johnson Records. They contributed the track "Big Jim (There's No Pubs in Heaven)" to the NME 's C86 compilation. They also recorded two sessions for BBC Radio 1's John Peel, the first of which was repeated seven times, such was Peel's high regard for it. The band had been working on an album, but it was shelved. When the band split up, the drummer Paul Turnbull resurfaced in The Secret Goldfish.

In 2026, the band reformed to complete the album, released as A Dog's Breakfast.

== Members ==
- Paul Turnbull (drums)
- Iain Beveridge (guitar)
- Gary Weir (vocals/guitar)
- Peter Gilmour (bass)

== Discography ==
=== Albums ===
- A Dog's Breakfast (2026), Last Night From Glasgow

=== Singles ===
- "New Breed" / "Dog's Breakfast" (April 1986, Ron Johnson Records, ZRON9 [7"]) No. 15 (UK Indie Chart)
- A Sensual Assault EP (February 1987, Ron Johnson Records, ZRON15 [12"]) No. 22 (UK Indie Chart)
