= Mighty Mighty =

Indie band formed in Birmingham, England

- Origin: Birmingham, England
- Genres: Indie pop
- Years active: 1983–1988, 2009–present
- Labels: Girlie, Chapter 22, Vinyl Japan, Firestation, Cherry Red
- Members: Russell Burton (vocals & bass); Mick Geoghegan (guitar); Pete Geoghegan (Vox organ and guitar); D J Hennessy (drums); Hugh McGuinness (vocals and harmonica)

Mighty Mighty are a British indie band formed in Birmingham, England, in the mid-1980s.

== History ==
Showing influences from Postcard Records bands such as Orange Juice, they came to prominence when featured on the NME's C86 compilation, at around the same time that they released their debut single "Everybody Knows the Monkey". This was soon followed by a 12" single, "Is There Anyone Out There?", before the band signed to Chapter 22 Records, releasing a string of well-received singles and the album Sharks in 1988. With their brand of indie pop giving way to American influenced rock and shoegazing, they split in 1988.

Continuing interest in the band saw the reissue of Sharks in 2000, the release of a compilation album of BBC session tracks in 2001, and two compilations of singles and unreleased tracks in 2000 and 2001.

They reformed for the Indietracks music festival in 2009.

They played Popfest Berlin in 2010, followed by Firestation Records of Berlin issuing their 'lost second album', The Betamax Tapes, on vinyl and CD, 25 years after it was recorded, in 2012.

In 2013, Cherry Red Records released a major double CD compilation entitled Pop Can - the Definitive Collection 1986-88 which collects most of the band's released material, namely all their singles, B-sides and EP tracks, alongside several tracks from their only album released during their career, Sharks, and tracks from The Betamax Tapes.

During 1986–87, they recorded three sessions for John Peel and one for Janice Long, all broadcast on BBC Radio One - these are collected on the Vinyl Japan compilation Mighty Mighty... At the BBC and continue to be broadcast by BBC Radio 6 Music.

In July 2019, Mighty Mighty released their third album Misheard Love Songs recorded at Muthers in Digbeth, Birmingham.

== Discography ==
Chart placings are from the UK independent chart.

=== Albums ===
- Sharks (1988, Chapter 22, CHAPLP24) reissued (2000), Vinyl Japan
- A Band from Birmingham (2000), Vinyl Japan
- The Girlie Years (2001), Vinyl Japan
- At the BBC (2001), Vinyl Japan
- The Betamax Tapes (2012), Firestation Records
- Pop Can - The Definitive Collection 1986-88 (2013), Cherry Red Records
- Misheard Love Songs (2019), Firestation Records

=== Singles ===
- "Everybody Knows the Monkey" (7", 1986, Girlie Records, GAY001) No. 34
- "Is There Anyone Out There?" (12", 1986, Girlie Records, XGAY2) No. 14
- "Throwaway" (7"/12", 1986, Chapter 22, CHAP10/12CHAP10) No. 7
- "Built Like a Car" (7"/12", 1987, Chapter 22, CHAP12/12CHAP12) No. 6
- "One Way" (7"/12", 1987, Chapter 22, CHAP19/12CHAP19) No. 10
- "Maisonette" (7"/12", 1988, Chapter 22, CHAP21/12CHAP21) No. 8
