= The Family School =

The Family School at Larkhall

Location
- 206-210 Lyham Road; Larkhall; London, SW2 5NR; England; 51.4522°N 0.1199°W

Information
- Type: Private school
- Motto: Where Learning is part of Living
- Established: 2007
- Founders: Polly Griffiths; Dil Green
- Closed: 2012
- Department for Education URN: 137017 Tables
- Ofsted: Reports
- Gender: Coeducational
- Age: 4 to 11
- Website: http://www.familyschool.co.uk/

The Family School at Larkhall was a small, alternative school, based in South London, UK, founded by Polly Griffiths in 2007/8 to offer a Democratic education model to primary age children. The school closed in December 2012.

The Family School was in the Free Schools tradition, with no set curriculum, working on the basis that children are natural learners.

The school was a charity, "reluctantly fee-paying", to quote its literature.

== History ==
Polly Griffiths and Dil Green, the founders of the school, worked to develop their ideas over two years with two other families and with Colin Hill, a teacher who had worked at Community and Voluntary Education in South London.

The Family School was founded in September 2008. For the first two years of its operation, families were officially home educators, as the school was not registered with Ofsted. After registering the school as an Independent School with DfE in September 2010, the school was inspected for the first time by Ofsted in June 2012 and was judged "Good" with "Outstanding" aspects. The small number of pupils attending made the school's financial viability increasingly difficult and therefore the school is currently temporarily closed pending re-opening on its new larger site in West Norwood.

== Site ==
The school was in premises in Brixton, but the Trustees have acquired a site in West Norwood which will provide its long-term home.

== Curriculum ==
The school had no set curriculum, and offered few formal lessons. Each pupil's journey through the school constituted the curriculum they followed. However, the school considered that certain skills and abilities were important to enable full participation in society, and these were incorporated into the school environment.
