= Twang (band) =

English indie band

- Origin: Manchester/Preston, England
- Genres: Indie rock
- Years active: 1985–1988
- Labels: Stet Records, Ron Johnson
- Members: Andy Ladd (vocals); Dave Hindmarsh (guitar); Jon Sargeant (bass); Leonard Penrose (drums)

Twang were an indie band from Manchester/Preston, England, signed to Ron Johnson Records. Their first release was a flexi-disc, "What's The Rub" in 1985 distributed with Debris magazine. Debut single proper, "Sharp" was released on the Stet label, and later released by Ron Johnson, reaching number 19 on the UK Indie Chart in 1986. This was followed by "Kick and Complain", which reached number 35. A final 12-inch release, "Snap Back", was issued late in 1987. The band were bracketed with other indie acts as part of the 'shambling' genre. However the band and similar hard edged label mates Big Flame and The MacKenzies somewhat disliked what they saw as lazy journalism.

The band toured nationally with Age of Chance and That Petrol Emotion and performed at a packed Hacienda at an AIDS benefit along with The Woodentops and Everything But The Girl. Latterly Albert Walton replaced Penrose on drums. The band split up in 1988.

Despite the band's short lifespan, they recorded three critically acclaimed sessions for John Peel's BBC Radio One show, two in 1986, and another in 1988.

One song from their first Peel session; "Big Dry Out" appeared on the Manchester So Much To Answer For compilation issued through the BBC, and featuring The Smiths amongst others.

The band have no connection with the band The Twang.

== Discography ==
Chart placings shown are from the UK Indie Chart.

- "What's The Rub" (1985) Lyntone (flexi-disc)
- "Sharp" (1986) Stet/Ron Johnson (#19)
- "Kick and Complain" (1987) Ron Johnson (#35)
- "Snap Back" (1987) Ron Johnson
