= Bogshed =

English band

- Origin: Hebden Bridge, England, UK
- Genres: Alternative, indie
- Years active: 1984–1988
- Labels: Shelfish, Vinyl Drip
- Members: Phil Hartley; Mark McQuaid; Mike Bryson; Tris King

Bogshed were an indie band formed in Hebden Bridge, West Yorkshire, England, in 1985 by Phil Hartley (vocals), Mark McQuaid (guitar), Mike Bryson (bass) and Tristan King (drums). They released two albums, two EPs and two singles before splitting up in 1987.

Bogshed were noted for their caustic lyrics that reflected an "everyday lunacy" and their primitive Captain Beefheart influenced music, described in 2022 as "the musical equivalent of poisoning the water hole".

== Career ==
The band formed in early 1984 and comprised Phil Hartley (vocals), Mark McQuaid (guitar), Mike Bryson (bass guitar), and Tris King (drums). Bryson also produced the cover art for the band's releases. The name came from a misheard line in a song, with Hartley explaining "I like the way that the mouth moves when you say Bog Shed". They were helped initially by the Membranes, leading to several performances in London, and the band's first release was the Let Them Eat Bogshed EP on John Robb's Vinyl Drip label in 1985. By the time of this release, the band had already played around 35 concerts and, according to Hartley, written between 80 and 100 songs.

Not really sounding like anyone before or since, they had much in common with some of the bands on the Ron Johnson label. Bryson explained their approach to songwriting: "We start out being totally out of order and out of key and we turn things like that into a pop song. Most people try to do it the other way round." Their song "Hand Me Down Father" was voted in 1985 to position No. 65 by the John Peel radio show audience in the 1985 Festive Fifty, a year in which the top 70 voted songs of the year were aired. They released two albums and several singles as well as recording five Peel Sessions, before splitting in 1987. Two of these sessions, from 1986, were issued on the Tried and Tested Public Speaker EP in January 1987, described by Liz Evans in Underground as "a mixture of throbbing, jogging rhythm and a bleating voice which rolls those words around and spits them out with plenty of spleen and bile".

Bogshed appeared on NME's C86 compilation. The term shambling was coined by John Peel to describe their sound although the term later became more commonly used to describe bands such as the Pastels.

== Post Bogshed ==
Phil Hartley recorded a solo Peel Session in 1988. He died on 11 October 2006. Tris King died of brain cancer on 21 December 2008.

Bryson recorded under the name of Forkeyes. A split mini-album 'Vier Mit Vier', with tracks by electronic musician Marcus H (Soiled) and Forkeyes was released in 2012 on Elm Lodge Records. He died in November 2022.

A boxset - Bog-Set - consisting of all their commercially released tracks plus Peel Sessions and various out-takes from Melodic Records was scheduled for release in December 2022.

== Discography ==
(Chart placings shown are from the UK Independent Chart)

=== Singles ===
- Let Them Eat Bogshed EP (1985, Vinyl Drip) No. 8
1. "Panties Please"
2. "Spencer Travis"
3. "Fat Lad Exam Failure"
4. "Slave Girls"
5. "City Girls"
6. "Hand Me Down Father"
- "Morning Sir" (1986, Shelfish) No. 2
1. "Morning Sir"
2. "The Story of Bogshed"
- Tried and Tested Public Speaker (The Peel Session) EP (1987, Shelfish) No. 13
1. "Tried And Tested Public Speaker"
2. "Champion Love Shoes"
3. "Little Grafter"
4. "Morning Sir"
5. "Fastest Legs"
6. "Adventure of Dog"
- "Excellent Girl" (1987, Shelfish) No. 30
1. "Excellent Girl"
2. "True Rope"
- "Stop Revolving" (1988, Shelfish) (only a few copies were released)

=== Albums ===
- Step on It (1986, Shelfish) No. 4
- Brutal (1987, Shelfish) No. 20

== Sources ==
- Robb, John. Death to Trad Rock. Cherry Red Books, 2010. ISBN 978-1-9014-4736-1
- Tassell, Nige. Whatever Happened to the C86 Kids? An Indie Odyssey. London: Nine Eight, 2023. ISBN 978-1-7887-0558-5
