= Close Lobsters =

Scottish indie pop rock band

- Also known as: Lobsters
- Origin: Paisley, Scotland
- Genres: Indie pop; jangle pop; C86
- Years active: 1985–1989, 2012–present
- Labels: Fire Records; Enigma Records; Shelflife Records
- Members: Andrew Burnett; Tom Donnelly; Bob Burnett; Stewart McFayden; Graeme Wilmington
- Website: Official website

Close Lobsters are a Scottish indie pop band formed in 1985 Paisley, Scotland, a suburb of Glasgow.

They released their first single, "Firestation Towers" on the NME's C86 compilation, establishing them as part of the rising jangle pop scene of the same name. They released two albums through Fire Records and achieved international indie success. They took an extended hiatus in 1989, and reformed in 2012, releasing their third album in 2020

== History ==
Close Lobsters released their first track, "Firestation Towers" on the NME's C86 compilation. They signed to Fire Records and released their debut single "Going To Heaven To See If It Rains" in October 1986. They released a second single "Never Seen Before" in April 1987 which strengthened their reputation as one of the leading emerging indie bands. They went on to release two albums: Foxheads Stalk This Land was released in 1987 and Headache Rhetoric in 1989. Rolling Stone's review of "Foxheads Stalk This Land" called it "first-rate guitar pop from a top-shelf band. Close Lobsters could have been just another jangle group, but they have a lot more going for them than just chiming Rickenbackers."

Their popularity on United States college radio stations led to an invitation to the New York Music Seminar in 1989, which in turn led to an extensive American tour. They toured extensively in the UK, Germany, United States and Canada. The band eventually took an extended break.

Their 'best of' singles compilation album, Forever, Until Victory!, (the title is from the reputed last sign-off in a letter from Ernesto 'Che' Guevara to Fidel Castro; 'Hasta la victoria siempre!') was released on 5 October 2009 on Fire Records.

Close Lobsters's song "Let's Make Some Plans" was covered by the Wedding Present on the B-side of their "California" single in 1992.

In March 2012, Close Lobsters reformed to play the second Madrid Popfest, Glasgow, third Popfest Berlin and the 2013 NYC Popfest.

In May 2014, Close Lobsters played the Copenhagen Popfest and released new EP, "Kunstwerk in Spacetime". Lead single "Now Time" received significant attention, and the band hinted at more new music to come in an interview with Sound.wav Music in July 2014.

Close Lobsters's song "Let's Make Some Plans" was covered by The Luxembourg Signal on the B-side of their "Laura Palmer" single in 2017.

In February 2020, the band released their latest album, Post Neo Anti: Arte Povera in the Forest of Symbols. It is their first new studio recording in over 30 years, and AllMusic noted "From the first strains of album opener "All Compasses Go Wild," it's uncanny how seamlessly the Lobsters pick up right where they left off".

== Discography ==
Chart placings shown are from the UK Indie Chart.

=== Albums ===
- Foxheads Stalk This Land (1987, Fire) (No. 12)
- Headache Rhetoric (1989, Fire) (No. 7)
- Forever Until Victory (2009, Fire)
- Post Neo Anti: Arte Povera in the Forest of Symbols (2020, Last Night From Glasgow)

=== Singles and EPs ===
- "Going to Heaven to See If It Rains" (1986, Fire) (No. 9)
- "Never Seen Before" (1987, Fire) (No. 11)
- "Let's Make Some Plans" (1987, Fire) (No. 17)
- "What Is There to Smile About?" (1988, Fire) (No. 17)
- "Evening Show Sessions" (1988, Night Tracks)
- "Nature Thing" (1989, Fire)
- "Just Too Bloody Stupid" (1989, Caff)
- "Steel Love/ Head Above Water" (2012, Firestation Records)
- "Kunstwerk in Spacetime" EP (2014, Shelflife Records)
- "Desire and Signs" EP (2016, Shelflife Records)
