= Ron Johnson Records =

UK independent record label

Ron Johnson Records was a UK independent record label based in Long Eaton operating between 1983 and 1988. The label contributed five tracks to the NME's C86 compilation. Run by Dave Parsons, the label released records by artists such as Big Flame, The Shrubs, A Witness, The Great Leap Forward, Stump, The Mackenzies, Twang and The Ex. Despite the press attention and critical acclaim for the label's bands and releases, sales were insufficient to make the label profitable and financial difficulties brought it to an end in 1988.

== Releases ==
- ZRON1: Splat! – "Yeah The Dum Dum" 7-inch EP (1983)
- ZRON2: Splat! – "Bloom" 12-inch EP (1984)
- ZRON3: Big Flame – Rigour 7-inch EP (1985) – UK Indie #22
- ZRON4: Big Flame – Tough! 7-inch EP (1985) – UK Indie #14
- ZRON5: A Witness – Loudhailer Songs 12-inch EP (1985) – UK Indie #9
- ZRON6: Stump – Mud on a Colon 12-inch EP (1986) – UK Indie #39
- ZRON7: Big Flame – "Why Popstars Can't Dance" 7-inch (1986) – UK Indie #13
- RERON8: Big Flame – Two Kan Guru 10-inch EP (1986)
- ZRON9: The Mackenzies – "New Breed" 7-inch (1986) – UK Indie #15
- ZRON10: The Shrubs – Full Steam into The Brainstorm mini-LP (1986)
- ZRON11: The Ex – 1936: The Spanish Revolution double 7-inch/book (1986) – UK Indie #6
- ZRON12: A Witness – I am John's Pancreas LP (1986) – UK Indie #18
- ZRON13: Big Flame – Cubist Pop Manifesto 7-inch EP (1986) – UK Indie #9
- ZRON14: Twang – "Sharp" 7-inch (1986) – UK Indie #19
- ZRON15: The Mackenzies – A Sensual Assault 12-inch EP (1987) – UK Indie #22
- EXRON16: Big Flame – Cubist Pop Manifesto 12-inch EP (1986)
- ZRON17: The Shrubs – Blackmailer 12-inch EP (1987)
- ZRON18: MKZ's – "Mealy Mix" 12-inch single (1988)
- ZRON19: The Noseflutes – The Ravers 12-inch EP (1986)
- ZRON20: The Great Leap Forward – Controlling The Edges of Tone 12-inch EP (1987)
- ZRON21: Various Artists – The First After Epiphany LP (1987)
- ZRON22: Twang – Kick and Complain 12-inch EP (1987) – UK Indie #35
- ZRON23: The Shrubs – Take Me Aside for a Midnight Harangue LP (1987)
- ZRON24: Jackdaw With Crowbar – Monarchy, Mayhem and Fishpaste 12-inch EP (1987)
- ZRON25: The Ex – Too Many Cowboys double-LP (1987)
- ZRON26: A Witness – "Red Snake" 12-inch (1987)
- ZRON27: The Great Leap Forward – "A Peck on the Cheek" 12-inch (1987)
- ZRON28: The Noseflutes – Heartache Is Irresistible 12-inch EP (1987)
- ZRON29: Twang – "Snapback" 12-inch (1987)
- ZRON30: A Witness – One Foot in the Groove 12-inch EP (1988)
- ZRON31: Jackdaw With Crowbar – Sink, Sank, Sunk 12-inch EP (1988)
- ZRON32: Sewer Zombies – Reach Out And... LP (1988)
- ZRON33: Jackdaw With Crowbar – Hot Air LP (1988)
- ZRON34: The Great Leap Forward – "Who Works The Weather?" 12-inch (1988)

== See also ==
- List of record labels
