= John Robb (musician) =

English music journalist (born 1961)

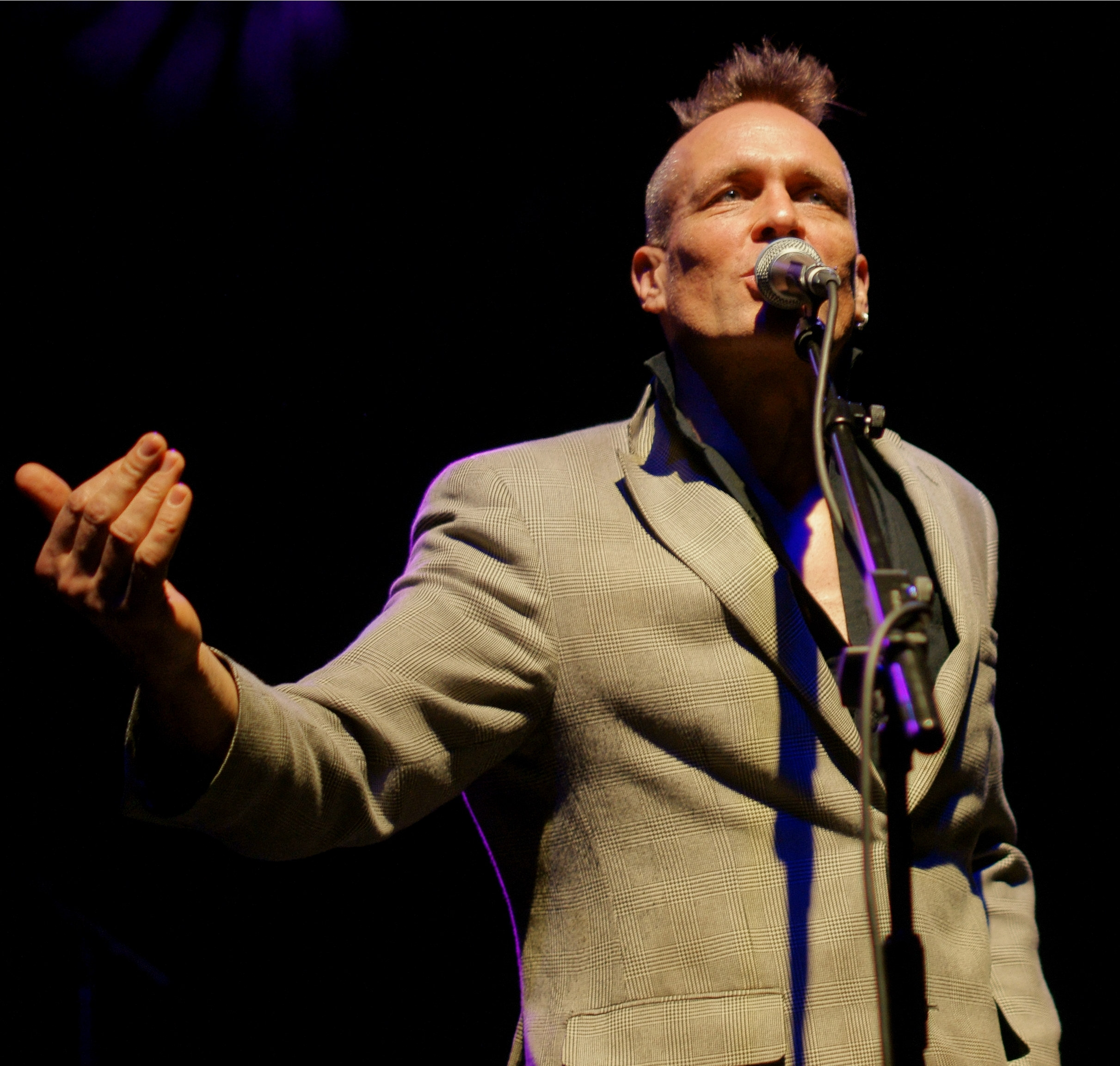
- Robb in 2011

Background information
- Born: John David Robb; 4 May 1961 (age 65); Fleetwood, Lancashire, England
- Genres: Punk rock; post-punk; art punk; noise rock; indie rock; hardcore punk; spoken word
- Occupations: Journalist; author; singer; musician; songwriter; commentator
- Instruments: Vocals; bass guitar
- Years active: 1977–present
- Member of: The Membranes; Goldblade
- Website: themembranes.co.uk

John David Robb (born 4 May 1961) is an English musician, author, music journalist, commentator and media personality. He is the bassist and singer for the post-punk band the Membranes and the vocalist for the punk rock band Goldblade.

He writes for and runs the Louder Than War website and a monthly music magazine of the same name. He has written several books on music and occasionally makes media appearances as a music commentator. In 2014, Robb was the founder and is now the executive director of the Louder Than Words Festival (a music writing festival held in Manchester every November).

== Early life ==
John David Robb was born on 4 May 1961 in Fleetwood, Lancashire, and grew up in Anchorsholme, Blackpool, Lancashire. He attended Blackpool Sixth Form College an addition to the Collegiate Grammar School which Robb attended, where after reading about the emerging punk rock scene in the music press in 1976 he was inspired to start his own band. He is a supporter of Blackpool F.C., and stated in January 2013: "I was born in Blackpool and supporting your local team is one of those things that gets under your skin for life."

== Career ==
=== Music ===
Robb was inspired by the do it yourself spirit of punk to form the Membranes in 1977; the band released several albums in the 1980s. They split up in 1990; Robb then formed Sensuround, who released two singles in the early 1990s. In 1994 he formed Goldblade, who have released albums including 2005's Rebel Songs and 2008's Mutiny, and singles such as "City of Christmas Ghosts", which features Poly Styrene on shared vocals. In 2013 Goldblade released the album The Terror of Modern Life via Overground Records.

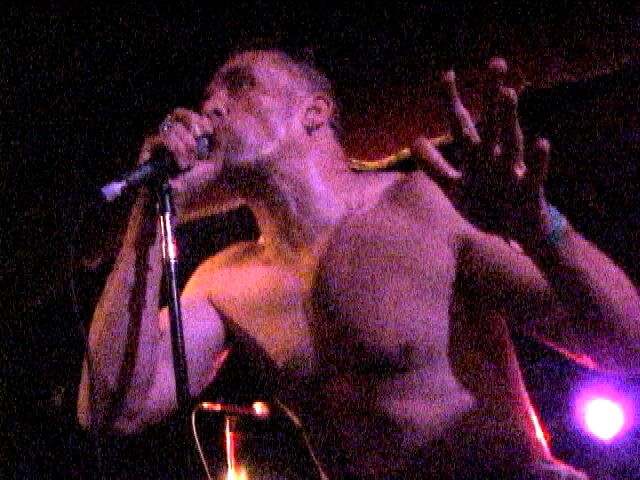
Robb performing with Goldblade in 2003

The Membranes reformed in 2010, appearing at the All Tomorrow's Parties Festival at the request of My Bloody Valentine, and released the 7-inch vinyl single "If You Enter The Arena, You Got To Be Prepared To Deal with the Lions" (Louder Than War Records). The single was released on Record Store Day in April 2012. Tim Burgess from the Charlatans released their next comeback single, "The Universe Explodes Into A Billion Photons Of Pure White Light", and the band released a new album, Dark Matter/Dark Energy, in June 2015 on Cherry Red. The band played concerts with a 25-piece choir in the UK and Europe in 2016, and in 2017 released a remix album titled Inner Space/Outer Space. In 2019 the Membranes released the acclaimed What Nature Gives...Nature Takes Away album on Cherry Red Records.

The group believe that "every gig must be an event" and have promoted sell-out shows where they explain the universe with scientists from the Higgs Boson project and a sold-out gig at the top of Blackpool Tower in August. Robb has produced several bands, and in the mid-1990s two singles by the Leicester three-piece Slinky and US punk band Done Lying Down, as well as Therapy? and Cornershop, whom he also co-managed.

=== Television ===
Robb has appeared as a pundit on various television programmes including BBC Breakfast, Channel 4's "top 100" shows, the BBC's I Love the 60s/70s/80s/90s series, and Seven Ages of Rock. He has contributed to BBC 2's The Culture Show, and has commented on pop culture and music for television documentaries. He has been a contributor to Sky's The Pop Years and co-produced and presented a ten-part series on the history of punk rock. He also presented a twelve-part guide to the arts in north-west England.

In 2021 Robb became the co-producer of a documentary about Alan McGee and launched his own YouTube channel to feature further interviews with cultural figures. In 2021 and 2022 he was a regular on many music documentaries on Channel 5 and BBC2.

=== Journalism and books ===
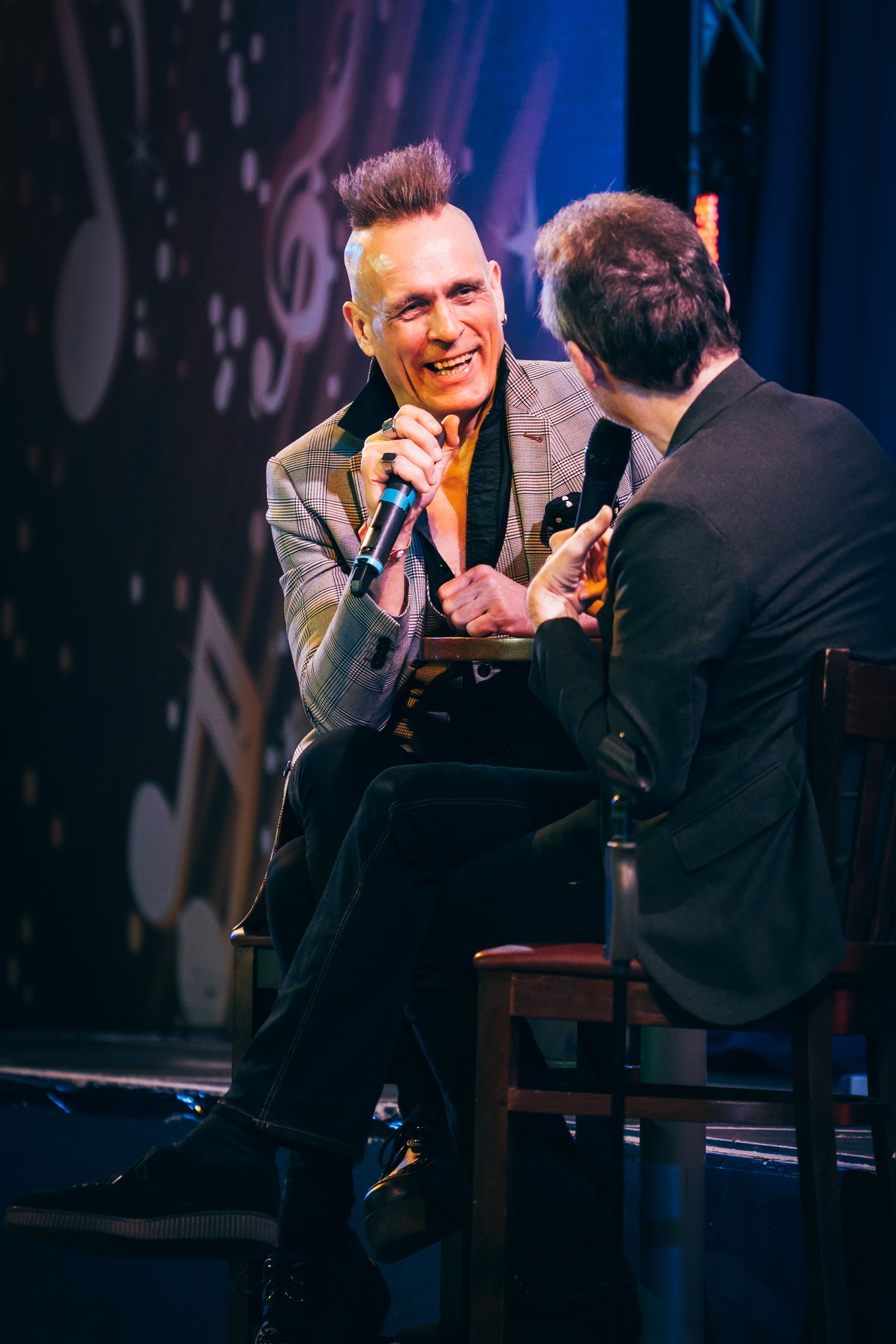
Robb interviewing Jim Reid, 2020

Robb has worked as a journalist for many years. Whilst a member of the Membranes he published his own small-town fanzine, Rox, which went on to be nationally distributed. He wrote for ZigZag in the 1980s, and was a regular freelance contributor to Sounds in the late 1980s, as well as writing for Melody Maker. He now writes for The Sunday Times, The Observer, The Guardian, The Independent, several websites, The Big Issue and magazines in Turkey, Algeria, the U.S., Russia, and Brazil.

Whilst working for Sounds, Robb was the first journalist to interview Nirvana (in 1988), and also later coined the word "Britpop".

In 2011, Robb launched an online rock music and pop culture magazine/blog called Louder Than War, focusing on arts news, reviews, and features. The site claims editorial independence, and includes contributions from Robb and several other freelance journalists and critics. In its first year, in November 2011, Robb was voted to win the UK Association of Independent Music 'Indie Champion' award. The website was also turned into a nationally distributed magazine in 2016.

Robb currently contributes a column to Viva!Life magazine, published by the vegan campaigning charity Viva!.

Robb's books include a biography of the Stone Roses, Stone Roses and the Resurrection of British Pop; Punk Rock: An Oral History, which has been translated into several different languages; Death To Trad Rock, an account of the 1980s UK DIY underground, including the Membranes, Three Johns, the Nightingales, and Big Flame; The North Will Rise Again – Manchester Music City from 1976 to 1996, an oral history of Manchester music, which received 4/5 stars in Q magazine and 5/5 stars in Mojo magazine. He co-wrote Manifesto, about the life and future green and eco vision of green energy pioneer Dale Vince, which was released in December 2019.

In 2023, he released the book The Art of Darkness: The History of Goth, a definitive survey of the form. In 2025 his next book was Live Forever – the Rise and Fall and Resurrection of Oasis featuring the only interview Noel Gallagher did that year.

== Published works ==
- The Stone Roses and the Resurrection of British Pop. Ebury Press, 1996. ISBN 978-0-09-187887-0
- Noise Bible – Adventures on the Eighties Underground with the Membranes. Thrill City.
- The Soul Manual. Ultimate.
- The Charlatans: We Are Rock. Ebury Press. ISBN 978-0-09-186568-9
- The Nineties: What the Fuck Was That All About. Ebury Press. ISBN 978-0-09-187135-2
- Punk Rock: An Oral History. Ebury Press, 2006. ISBN 978-0-09-190511-8
- The North Will Rise Again – Manchester Music City 1976–1996. Aurum Press, 2009. ISBN 978-1-84513-534-8
- Death to Trad Rock – The Post-Punk Fanzine Scene 1982–1987. Cherry Red, 2009. ISBN 978-1-901447-36-1
- The Stone Roses and the Resurrection of British Pop: The Reunion Edition. Ebury Press, 2012. ISBN 978-0-091948-58-0
- Manifesto. Ebury Press, 2012. ISBN 1529107091
- The Art of Darkness: The History of Goth. Louder Than War Books, 2023. ISBN 978-1-914424-86-1
- Do You Believe in the Power of Rock & Roll?: Forty Years of Music Writing from the Frontline. Unbound, 2023. ISBN 978-1800182189
- Live Forever - the Rise and Fall and Resurrection of Oasis. Harper North, 2025. ISBN 978-0-008751364
- Punk Rock Ruined My Life (2026). Manchester University Press. ISBN 978-1526191786
