= Big Flame (band) =

Post-punk/indie rock three piece band

- Origin: Manchester, England
- Genres: post-punk
- Years active: 1983–1986
- Labels: Ron Johnson, Laughing Gun
- Past members: Alan Brown; Greg Keeffe; Dil Green
- Website: Facebook

Big Flame (often rendered bIG*fLAME) were an English post-punk three piece band, based in Manchester, England, and active from 1983 to 1986. The members were Alan Brown (bass, vocals), Greg Keeffe (guitar) and Dil Green (drums). After a debut EP ("Sink") on their own Laughing Gun label, they joined the Ron Johnson roster for a series of mid-1980s singles as well as an appearance on the NME's C86 compilation.

On the reverse of the "Two Kan Guru" compilation, it was jokingly stated that Green and Brown played in the original line-up of Wham! with George Michael and Andrew Ridgeley.

In addition to releasing five singles and a compilation EP, Big Flame also recorded four sessions for the John Peel Show. Big Flame were a major influence on Manic Street Preachers. In a 1991 interview, Richey Edwards stated "The 80s, for us, was the biggest non-event ever, like C86. All we had was Big Flame. Big Flame was the most perfect band. But we couldn't play their records 'cos they were too avant garde".

The group also operated beyond the confines of the band itself. Keeffe and Green hosted a night at Manchester's Man Alive club which they christened "The Wilde Club" providing a useful venue for groups other than their own. This spirit was also reflected in Ugly Noise Undercurrents which was a band-swap concept conceived by Brown, to provide emerging groups with a facility for securing gigs in towns and cities beyond their home base. The Allez Ugly newsletter was the primary driver for this.

After the band split in 1986, Brown joined Ron Johnson labelmates A Witness on drums, touring the UK and Europe and appearing on several records (the 12-inch EP 'One Foot in the Groove' and Strange Fruit Double Peel Sessions) and three sessions for BBC Radio One DJ John Peel. He left A Witness in 1988 to form solo project Great Leap Forward, while Keeffe joined Meatmouth (with Mark Whittam and Nicholas Blincoe) who released "Meatmouth is Murder" on Factory Records, FAC 196.

After a break from music, Alan Brown teamed up with Daren Garratt (of Pram) and Vince Hunt (of A Witness) in the band Marshall Smith, releasing an album Colours in 2006 on the Euphonium label.

In 2007, Alan Brown joined Sarandon as bass player, and performed with a reformed A Witness in 2014. Since 2008 he has revived The Great Leap Forward and continues to release albums on a sporadic basis.

Greg Keeffe was professor of sustainable architecture at Leeds Metropolitan University, Leeds until May 2012, and is now Professor of Architecture at Queen's University Belfast.

After a career in architecture and construction, and co-founder of the Family School, Dil Green is now working on post-capitalist economic projects with Mutual Credit Services.

== Discography ==
- "Sink"/"Illness"/"Sometimes" - 7-inch EP, Laughing Gun Records (own label), 1984
- "Rigour" - 7-inch EP, Ron Johnson Records, 1985
- "Tough" - 7-inch EP, Ron Johnson Records, 1985
- "Two Kan Guru" (compilation) - 10-inch EP, Ron Johnson Records, 1985
- "Why Popstars Can't Dance" - 7-inch EP, Ron Johnson Records, 1986
- "Cubist Pop Manifesto" - 7-inch EP, Ron Johnson Records, 1986
- "Cubist Pop Manifesto" - 12-inch EP, Constrictor Records, 1987
- Rigour - CD compilation album of all the above, Drag City Records, 1996
- Peel Sessions 84-86 - 12-inch LP, Precious Recordings, 2025

== Tracks released on other complications ==
- "New Way (Quick Wash And Brush Up With Liberation Theology)" on cassette NME C86 1986
- "Debra" on "Commercially Unfriendly" CD Gott Discs 2005
- "¡Cuba!" on "Death To Trad Rock" CD Cherry Red Records 2009
- "Debra" on "Scared To Get Happy" CD Cherry Red Records 2013
- "New Way (Quick Wash And Brush Up With Liberation Theology)" on CD NME C86 Cherry Red Records 2014
- "Why PopStars Can't Dance" on Manchester North Of England CD Cherry Red Records 2017
