= The Membranes =

English band

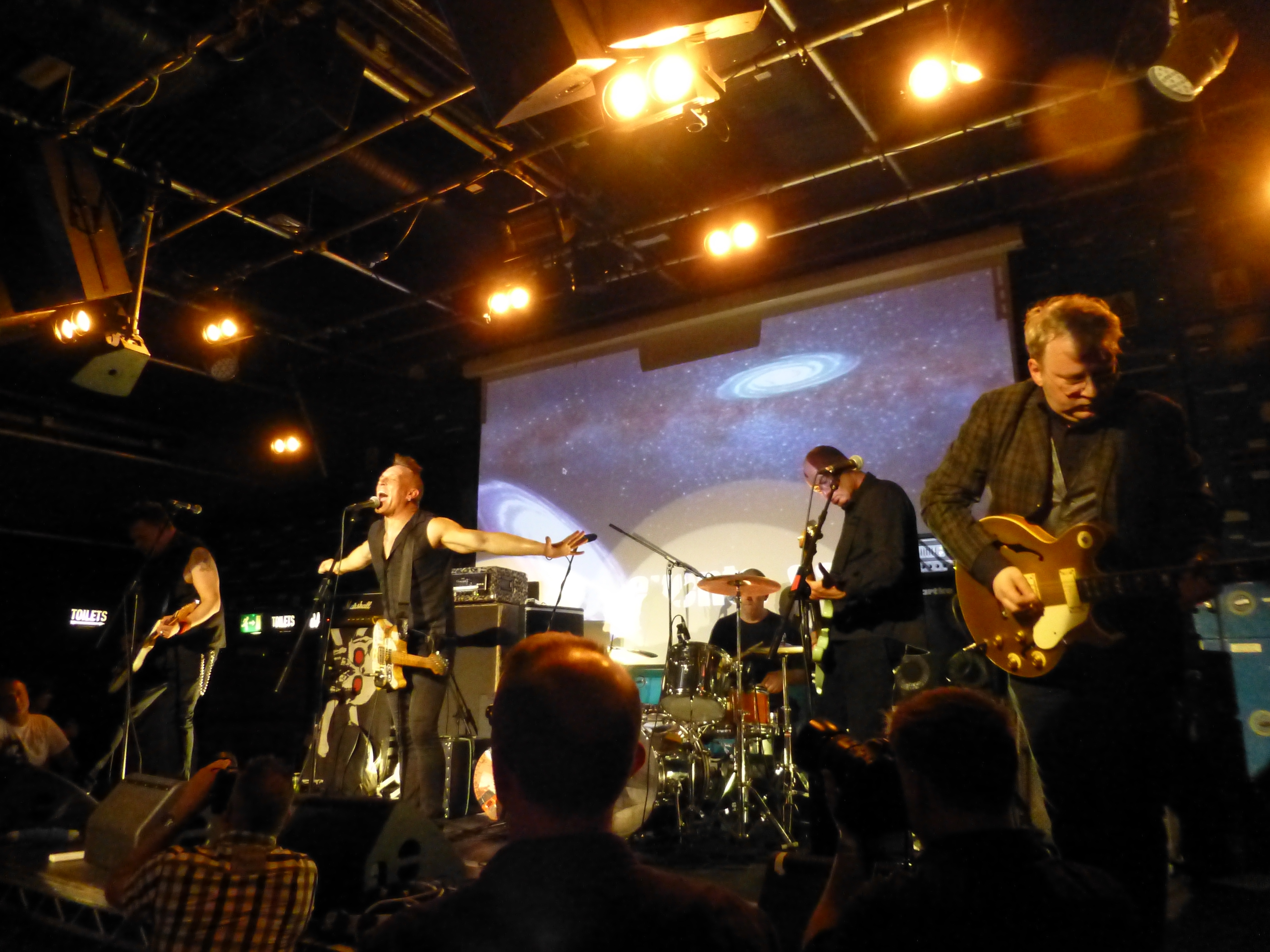
- The Membranes on stage in Manchester, 2013

Background information
- Origin: Blackpool, England
- Genres: Post-punk, noise rock
- Years active: 1977–1990, 2009–present
- Labels: Cherry Red, Creation, Vinyl Drip, Criminal Damage, Rondelet, In-tape, Constrictor, Glass, Clawfist
- Members: John Robb (1977–1990, 2009–present); Nick Brown (1982–1990, 2009–present); Peter Byrchmore (2009–present); Rob Haynes (2009–present)
- Past members: Mark Tilton (1977–1985); Coofy Sid (197?-1990); Martyn Critchley (1977); Martin Kelly (1977–1982); Steve Farmery (1982); Stan Batcow (1985–1986); Wallas Terror (1986–1988); Keith Curtis (1986–1990); Paul Morley (1989–1990)
- Website: themembranes.co.uk

The Membranes are an English post-punk and noise rock band formed in Blackpool, Lancashire in 1977. The initial line-up was John Robb (bass), Mark Tilton (guitar), Martyn Critchley (vocals) and Martin Kelly (drums). Critchley soon left, with Robb and Tilton taking on vocals, and Kelly moving to keyboards, with "Coofy Sid" (Coulthart) taking over on drums.

Their first release was the "Flexible Membrane" flexi-disc in 1980, and over the next 11 years they went on to release six studio albums. Their first single proper, "Muscles", was a single of the week in the UK music press and a big club hit in New York being played in the Danceteria by the Beastie Boys eventual DJ Mojo and other New York DJs. Kelly left after "Muscles", to be replaced by Steve Farmery on guitar for the follow-up Pin Stripe Hype EP.

The band pioneered the avant noise scene of Big Black and Sonic Youth for several years with their "Spike Milligan's Tape Recorder" single and Death To Trad Rock EP and their debut Gift of Life album. They were destined to be the first band to be signed to Alan McGee's Creation label, but the deal fell through when McGee could not afford to pay their studio bill for the "Spike Milligan's Tape Recorder" single. The band relocated to Manchester in 1983, and "Spike Milligan's Tape Recorder" was issued on the Criminal Damage label, which met with a positive critical response but distribution problems limited its impact. After The Membranes, Robb went on to form Sensuround and later Goldblade.

In 2009, the band reformed after My Bloody Valentine asked the band to play their All Tomorrows Parties festival. They then recorded the Dark Matter/Dark Energy album and have been playing festivals across Europe since then as well as special event gigs such as at the top of Blackpool Tower. The band received press acclaim for a series of concerts they played with choirs in Estonia and Portugal as well as the BIMM choir in the UK.

== History ==
In 1977, John Robb and Mark Tilton formed the band at Blackpool Sixth Form College. Inspired by punk rock and the DIY ethic of punk, they started both a fanzine, Rox, and The Membranes at the same time. Tilton, who lived a few doors down the road from Robb, bought a 'Woolworth's special' guitar from a junk shop, while Robb built his own bass guitar out of spare parts and a slab of wood from a local DIY store (along with dustbin lids, the band having no drummer at this stage). They then enlisted a singer Martyn Critchley and Martin Kelly joined on drums. Critchley subsequently left, with Robb and Tilton taking over to share the vocals, Martin Kelly moving to keyboards with a Wasp synthesiser and a 13-year-old called "Coofy Sid" (Coulthart) joining on drums. Their first recording was "Ice Age", which appeared on the Blackpool Rox EP featuring Section 25, Syntax and The Kenneth Turner Set on Robb's Vinyl Drip label,

After a flexi-disc debut, the Flexible Membrane EP in 1980, they released the debut single proper "Muscles" in 1982, which was raved over by both the music press and John Peel. That record's success saw the band sign a deal with Rondelet Records who issued a follow-up, the Pin Stripe Hype EP (the only Membranes record to feature guitarist Steve Farmery). Rondelet folded and the band signed to Criminal Damage Records.

After Farmery left, the band went deeper into their new direction. Coofy Sid's drumming became more tribal and the guitars wilder and heavier.

They would have been the first band to sign to Creation Records, and the label's first release would have been "Spike Milligan's Tape Recorder", but Alan McGee had no money to pay for the recording studio so the band stayed with Criminal Damage and released this 7-inch single, described in ZigZag as "not only have The Membranes wiped the floor with the opposition, they redesigned the tiles". They were awarded single of the week in all four music papers, and "Spike Milligan" reached number six in the John Peel Festive Fifty.

In January 1985, The Membranes appeared on The Tube and released the Death to Trad Rock EP which reached number 8 in the UK Indie Chart and saw the band on the front cover of Sounds. At this point Tilton left the band: he was replaced shortly after by Stan Batcow, who came in on bass with Robb moving to guitar.

The band then signed to In Tape, the label run by Marc Riley and released their Songs of Love and Fury, their breakthrough album in the US.

=== 2009 reunion ===
In 2009, the band were asked to reform for the All Tomorrows Parties festival (ATP), curated by My Bloody Valentine and then they played ATP at the request of Shellac. This successful show was followed by a gig in Istanbul, and a sold out 2010 gig in London.

In 2012, the band reconvened to record a triple AAA side single for Louder Than War Records for release on Record Store Day and performed at the Incubate festival.

In June 2015, the band released an acclaimed album called Dark Matter/Dark Energy on Cherry Red Records in Europe and Metropolis Records in the USA and South America. The album made many of the year-end best album lists for 2015.

This double album was built around their "The Universe Explained" gig where they had Higgs boson scientists explain the universe before The Membranes played a set to finish. The album was launched by a gig at the top of Blackpool Tower – the first time a band had played there. The album was critically acclaimed with the website The Quietus calling it "one of the albums of the year" and NME calling it "an extraordinary comeback" and was regularly played on BBC Radio 6 Music where they recorded several sessions for Marc Riley.

The band played concerts in Estonia, Portugal and the UK with the 30 piece BIMM choir in September 2015 and toured the world in 2015/16. They supported The Stranglers on their UK tour in March 2015 and The Sisters of Mercy and Killing Joke in 2016. The band played several festivals in 2016 including Glastonbury, Green Man, By the Sea, Grauzone, At the Edge of The Sea, Beautiful Days, Bearded Theory and supported Therapy on their February 2016 UK tour.

In February 2016, the band released a joint single with the Sireen choir from Estonia called "The Universe Explodes into a Billion Photons of Pure White Light" which was recorded at their second session for Marc Riley on his 6 Music show.

In November 2016, the band released a remix of the whole of their Dark Matter/Dark Energy album under the name Inner Space/Outer Space, with mixes from Manic Street Preachers, Alexander hacked from Einsturzende Neubauten, Therapy, Killing Joke, Phillip Boa, Reverend And The Makers, Keith Levene, The Pop Group, Godflesh, Clint Mansell, Cosey Fanni Tutti and many others.

The band released their sixth album – a double, What Nature Gives...Nature Takes Away on Cherry Red Records in June 2019. It was built around the theme of nature and features a 20 piece choir and contributions from Chris Packham Shirley Collins Jordan and Kirk Brandon.

== Band members ==
=== Current members ===
- John Robb – vocals, guitar, bass (1977–1990, 2009–present)
- Nick Brown – guitar (1982–1990, 2009–present)
- Peter Byrchmore – guitar (2009–present)
- Rob Haynes – drums (2009–present)

=== Former members ===
- Mark Tilton – guitar, vocals (1977–1985)
- Martin Kelly – keyboards, drums (1977–1982)
- Martyn Critchley – vocals (1977)
- "Coofy Sid" Coulthart – drums (1977–1990)
- Steve Farmery – guitar (1982)
- Stan Batcow – bass (1985–1986)
- Wallas Terror – bass (1986–1988)
- Keith Curtis – guitar (1986–1990)
- Paul Morley – bass (1989–1990)

== Discography ==
UK Independent Chart positions in brackets.

=== Albums ===
- Crack House (1983, Criminal Damage)
- The Gift of Life (1985, Creation) (No. 15)
- Giant (1986, Constrictor) (Germany only)
- Songs of Love and Fury (1986, In Tape) (4)
- Kiss Ass... Godhead! (1988, Glass) (8)
- To Slay the Rock Pig (1989, Vinyl Drip)
- Dark Matter/Dark Energy (2015, Cherry Red)
- Inner Space / Outer Space (2016, Louder Than War Records)
- What Nature Gives / Nature Takes Away (7 June 2019, Cherry Red)
- The Italian Job '86 (15 June 2020, SMASH (Greece)) (10-inch lathe cut clear vinyl limited to 40 copies) (Recorded in Brindisi, Italy in 1986)
- Kiss Ass... Godhead! (29 August 2020, Glass Modern) (Record Store Day 30th Anniversary Pink Vinyl Edition, 300 copies)
- Dark Matter/Dark Energy (29 November 2024, Louder Than War Records) Reissue. Released in two variants: 2LP 'Universe Coloured' vinyl 100 copies. 2LP Crystal Clear' vinyl 200 copies.

=== Singles/EPs ===
- Flexible Membrane (1980, Vinyl Drip) (7-inch flexi-disc)
- "Muscles" (1982, Vinyl Drip/Rondelet Records)
- Pin Stripe Hype (1982, Rondelet)
- "Spike Milligan's Tape Recorder" (1984, Criminal Damage) (No. 12)
- Death To Trad Rock (1985, Criminal Damage) (12-inch) (No. 8)
- "Everything's Brilliant" (1986, In Tape) (No. 11)
- "Groovy F---ers" (1987, Constrictor)
- "Time Warp 1991" (1987, Glass)
- Euro Pig Vs Auto Flesh EP (1989, Vinyl Drip)
- "Big Decision (Slight Return)" (1991, Clawfist) (split 7-inch with That Petrol Emotion)
- "If You Enter The Arena You Got To be Prepared To Deal With The Lions" (2013, Southern)
- "The Universe Explodes Into A Billion Photons Of Pure White Light" (2014, O Genesis)
- "Do The Supernova" (2015 Cherry Red Records) (7-inch released for Record Store Day 2015)
- "The Universe Explodes Into A Billion Photons Of Pure White Light" with the Sireen choir (2016, Cherry Red Records)
- "Breathe In Breathe Out" (4 August 2020, download)
- "Borders Blurred" (15 August 2021, Mr Lewis Records)

=== Compilations ===
- Pulp Beating and All That (1986, Criminal Damage)
- The Virgin Mary Versus Peter Sellers (1987, Vinyl Drip)
- Wrong Place at the Wrong Time (1993, Constrictor)
- The Best of the Membranes (1997, Anagram)
- Tatty Seaside Town (2005) 'The Ugly Truth About Blackpool' (CD by Just Say No to Government Music)
- Everyone's Going Triple Bad Acid, Yeah The Complete Membranes 1980–1993 (2017, Cherry Red Records)
