= Scrabbling at the Lock =

Studio album by The Ex and Tom Cora
- Released: August 1991
- Recorded: at ADM's Koeienverhuurbedrijf, Amsterdam, Netherlands
- Genres: Anarcho-punk; avant-rock; art punk; free improvisation; gypsy punk
- Length: 51:24
- Producer: Dolf Planteijdt

The Ex chronology
6 (1991)	Scrabbling at the Lock (1991)	And the Weathermen Shrug Their Shoulders (1993)

Tom Cora chronology
Bee (1991)	Scrabbling at the Lock (1991)	Differently Desperate (1991)

Scrabbling at the Lock is the first of two albums by Dutch punk band The Ex in collaboration with avant-garde cellist Tom Cora. It is also the first of The Ex's studio albums to feature the work of then Dog Faced Hermans guitarist Andy Moor, who has remained in the band ever since.

== Background ==
With the release of their album Joggers and Smoggers, The Ex were developing further collaborations with musicians from around the world, including New York-based cellist Tom Cora. In the midst of launching their six-part record subscription series and organizing tours on North American, the Netherlands, and Great Britain, The Ex and Cora spent a week in Dolf Planteijdt's studio at the end of January 1991. The 12 songs were mixed in February and slated for a release during a break from tour that summer.

The album features heavy interplay of two guitars, bass, cello and more prominent female vocals. Dean McFarlane of Allmusic wrote that by this time the band "were starting to experiment in new tangents that incorporated the influence of folk and free improvisation." He found the album to "explore the delicate modalities of European folk." The Wire described the collaboration as "unusual even by their far-reaching standards." The track "Batium" is an adaption of a piece by late Turkish musician Ismet Siral while the track "Hidegen Fújnak a Szelek" ("Cold Winds Are Blowing") is a cover of a song originally written by Hungarian folk music band Muzsikas.

Another version of the album's second song, the Hungarian folk anthem "Hidegen Fújnak a Szelek", sung by The Ex's drummer, Katerina Boerfield, had been previously released as a single without Tom Cora, included on the A-side the third 7" in The Ex's 6 album. An earlier recording of "Fire and Ice" appeared on the band's 1984 album Blueprints for a Blackout. The album's lead track, "State of Shock," would later be recorded for the Dutch language album Een Rondje Holland featuring The Ex backed by a 20-piece orchestra.

== Release ==
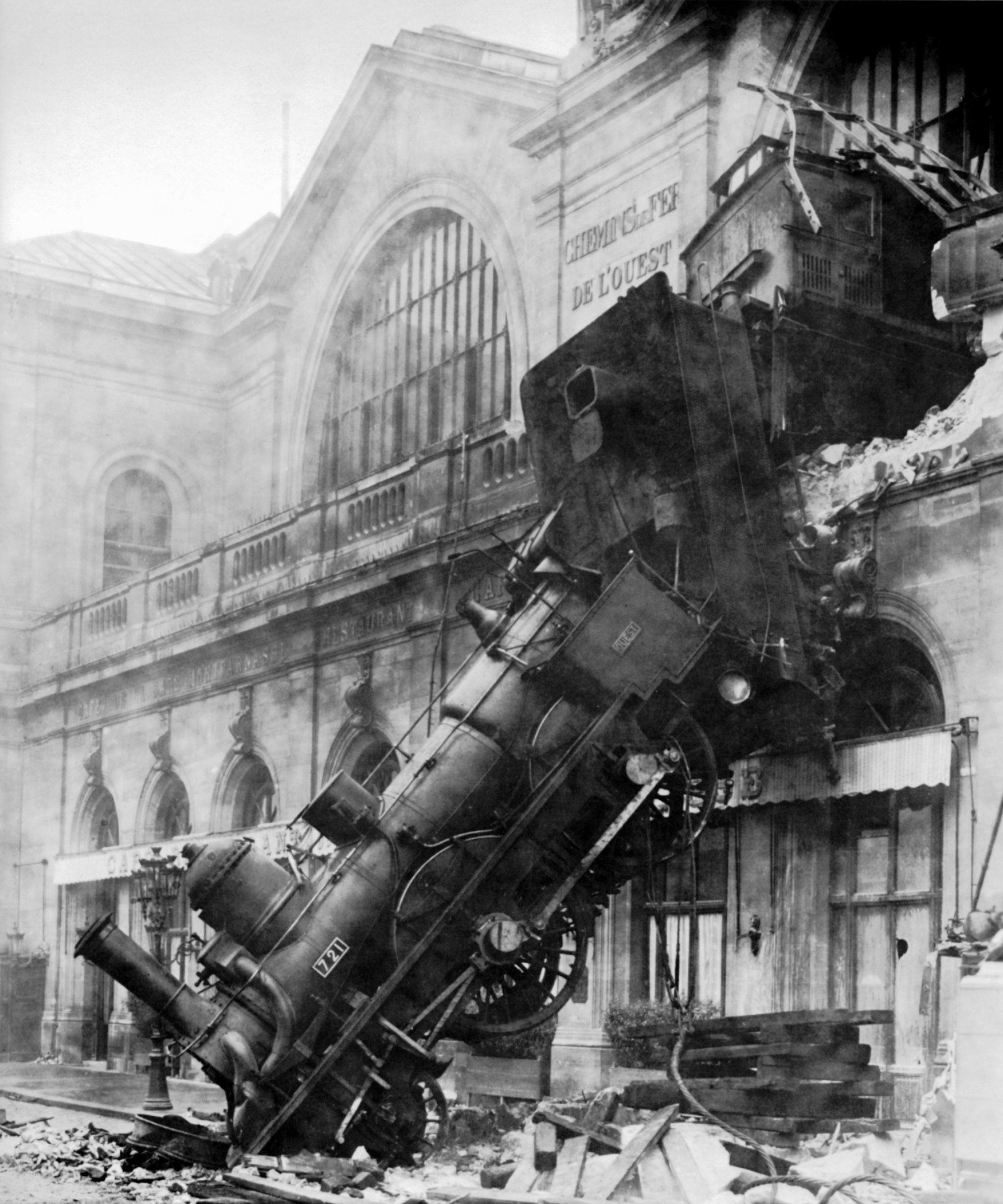
The photo of the 1895 Montparnasse derailment depicted on the cover of Scrabbling at the Lock

Scrabbling at the Lock was released in August 1991 midway between the first and second half of The Ex's 6 singles series. The album's title was adopted from a text by songwriter Peter Hammill whose song "A Motor-Bike In Afrika" The Ex had covered on their album Aural Guerrilla. Scrabbling at the Lock's cover photo depicted the Montparnasse derailment, a dramatic trainwreck that occurred in France in October 1895, and the record was the first of The Ex's album's to include only one insert: a single, large, black-and-white poster. The band arranged a concert that coincided with Cora being in Europe, held at Amsterdam's Paradiso club, to celebrate both the album's release and the band's 500th live performance (though it was actually their 499th).

== Reception ==
Professional ratings
Review scores
Source	Rating
AllMusic	3/5 stars
The Encyclopedia of Popular Music	4/5 stars
The Great Alternative & Indie Discography	5/10
Tom Hull	B+

Many critics have described the album as one of The Ex's best, and buzz about the record bolstered the band's career internationally at the time of its release. Writing for Trouser Press, critic Douglass Wolk gushed about the record, calling it, "the Ex's first genuinely great album," calling Cora "the closest thing the cello has to a Jimi Hendrix," noting that "the Ex were expanding how a punk band could sound by exploring improvisation and traditional music," and summarizing the album's results as "adventurous, fresh and lovely-and also rock like a house on fire." LA Weekly called the "genre-smashing project" as where "[t]he band arguably hit their high-water mark". Dusted magazine described the album as "dissonant and jarring, yet also strangely beautiful in places [...] almost 20 years after it was first recorded, [it] still feels unlike anything else." Bill Meyer of Chicago Reader noted "an intoxicating chemistry" from the collaboration.

Despite its middling score, Allmusic's retrospective review is quite positive, calling Scrabbling at the Lock "a beautiful, candid recording that marks an inspired new tangent for the Ex which sparked themes that would run through their recordings for the remainder of the decade – where folk and free improvisation would collide elegantly with their soaring autodidactic avant-rock." Exclaim! considers it to be one of the "Key Recordings" of "non-idiomatic improvised music" to have come from The Netherlands.

== Track listing ==
1. "State of Shock" – 6:05
2. "Hidegen Fújnak a Szelek" – 3:17
3. "King Commie" – 3:28
4. "Crusoe" – 3:29
5. "The Flute's Tale" – 4:02
6. "A Door" – 5:05
7. "Propadada" – 4:19
8. "Batium" – 3:52
9. "Total Preparation" – 6:19
10. "1993" – 2:26
11. "Fire and Ice" – 6:05
12. "Sukaina" – 2:51

== Personnel ==
- Terrie (guitar)
- G.W. Sok (vocals)
- Luc (bass)
- Andy Moor (guitar)
- Katrin (drums, vocals)
- Tom Cora (cello)
- Marion Coutts (trumpet on track 5)
- Catherine Jauniaux (vocals on tracks 1, 3, 4, 6, 7, 9 and 10)

== Notes ==
- Cogan, Brian. Encyclopedia of Punk Music and Culture. Westport, Conn.: Greenwood Press, 2006. p. 70. ISBN 978-0-313-33340-8.
- Mount, Heather. "Three Looks into The Ex". In Crane, Larry. Tape Op: The Book about Creative Music Recording, Volume 2. Milwaukee: Hal Leonard Corporation, 2010. pp. 230–233.
- Robbins, Ira A., ed. The Trouser Press Guide to '90s Rock: The all-new 5th edition of The Trouser Press Record Guide. New York: Simon & Schuster, 1997. ISBN 0684814374.
- Sok, G.W. A Mix of Bricks & Valentines: Lyrics 1979–2009. New York: PM Press, 2011.
- Temporary Services. Group Work. New York: Printed Matter, March 2007.
