= And the Weathermen Shrug Their Shoulders =

Studio album by The Ex and Tom Cora
- Released: October 19, 1993
- Recorded: January 15–22, 1993 at the Friends Studio, Amsterdam
- Genres: Experimental rock; art punk; free improvisation; world music
- Length: 57:03
- Label: Fist Puppet
- Producers: Dolf Planteijdt, The Ex, and Tom Cora

The Ex chronology
Scrabbling at the Lock (1991)	And the Weathermen Shrug Their Shoulders (1993)	Mudbird Shivers (1995)

Tom Cora chronology
A Beautiful Western Saddle (1993)	And the Weathermen Shrug Their Shoulders (1993)	Cyberband (1994)

Professional ratings
Review scores
Source	Rating
Allmusic	4/5 stars
The Encyclopedia of Popular Music	4/5 stars
The Great Alternative & Indie Discography	4/10
Tom Hull	B+

And the Weathermen Shrug Their Shoulders is the second of two albums by Dutch punk band The Ex in collaboration with avant-garde cellist Tom Cora. Cora was acknowledged in the credits of earlier album Joggers and Smoggers but didn't actually appear on an Ex album until a recording session in 1990 which led to Scrabbling at the Lock as well as And the Weathermen Shrug Their Shoulders.

== Recording and release ==
After wrapping up their subscription album of seven singles in early 1992 The Ex toured Europe and North America with Tom Cora to support the release of 1991's Scrabbling at the Lock album whilst working on new material. In January 1993 the artists entered the Friends Studio in Amsterdam when they recorded 16 songs with Dolf Planteijdt, along with regular collaborator Johannes van der Weert adding to the group's vocal line-up. The group returned to the studio in May to mix the tracks.

The Ex released And the Weathermen Shrug Their Shoulders both LP and CD in co-production with the Swiss label RecRec. The album's front cover sported a painting by Alex van Zanten based on a photograph from the Russian photographer Jakow Chalip and was replicated on the album's poster insert that also featured a collage of lyrics and flyers. The CD version contained the same material, formatted as a CD booklet. The album's initial pressing came out on June 1, 1993, supported by a release tour of the Netherlands. The band later issued it, along with their entire back catalog, on the music streaming-and-download service Bandcamp.

== Reception ==
And the Weathermen Shrug Their Shoulders and its predecessor, Scrabbling at the Lock, brought wider attention to both The Ex and Toma Cora as "crossover" records that bridged a perceived gap between punk rock and avant-garde music. Bill Meyer wrote for Chicago Reader that both the collaborative albums "reveal an intoxicating chemistry. The Ex push Cora to play more directly than usual, while his improvisational chops and broad musical vocabulary have facilitated the live realization of the promise shown on Joggers and Smoggers [...] his delicately plucked accents articulate the Oriental flavor of "Okinawa Mon Amour." He may be only one player, but he has an unusually broad and exotic musical vocabulary, and with his assistance the Ex can now improvise and successfully interpret European and Asian folk songs onstage." Writing for Trouser Press Douglass Wolk said that while the album was slightly inferior to its predecessor, this "denser, darker album [...] has its share of great songs, particularly "Dere Geliyor Dere" (another Siral piece) and two excuses for singer G.W. Sok to run off at the mouth and sound good doing it: "What's the Story" (with lyrics taken from an interview with film director Sam Fuller) and the hilarious fake materialist manifesto, "Everything & Me."" The track "War O.D." ("the climax of many of the Ex's shows with Cora") was praised as "one of the sharpest songs they've ever written, politically and musically."

Writing retrospectively of the album, Dean McFarlane of Allmusic says that the "second album of this winning collaboration [...] continue to indulge [the group's] collective love for European folk themes and free improvisation." He praised "the delicate melodious folk [...], curious improvised sound-searching" which "marked a new tangent the group followed into a total free-form improvisation inspired by the likes of avant-garde jazz associates Han Bennink and Misha Mengelberg." Despite this, he writes that the group " never left their punk roots behind" and concluded by calling them "one of the genre's most interesting and inventive groups."

== Track listing ==
1. "Dere Geliyor Dere" - 4:20
2. "The Big Black" - 5:33
3. "What's the Story" - 2:19
4. "Lamp Lady" - 3:48
5. "One-Liner from China" - 1:32
6. "Everything and Me" - 3:59
7. "New Clear Daze" - 4:41
8. "Oh Puckerlips Now" - 4:04
9. "Empty V" - 2:25
10. "Okinawa Mon Amour" - 2:26
11. "Dear House" - 4:41
12. "Conviction Going Gaga" - 1:36
13. "Stupid Competitions" - 4:15
14. "Hickwall" - 3:11
15. "War OD" - 6:12
16. "Untitled" - 2:01

== Personnel ==
- Terrie (guitar)
- G.W. Sok (vocals)
- Luc (bass)
- Andy (guitar)
- Katrin (drums, vocals)
- Tom Cora (cello).

Recorded at Friends Studio, Amsterdam, Netherlands. Produced by Dolf Planteijdt.

== Notes ==
- Cogan, Brian. Encyclopedia of Punk Music and Culture. Westport, Conn.: Greenwood Press, 2006. p. 70. ISBN 978-0-313-33340-8.
- Mount, Heather. "Three Looks into The Ex". In Crane, Larry. Tape Op: The Book about Creative Music Recording, Volume 2. Milwaukee: Hal Leonard Corporation, 2010. pp. 230–233.
- Robbins, Ira A., ed. The Trouser Press Guide to '90s Rock: The all-new 5th edition of The Trouser Press Record Guide. New York: Simon & Schuster, 1997. ISBN 0684814374.
- Sok, G.W. A Mix of Bricks & Valentines: Lyrics 1979–2009. New York: PM Press, 2011.
- Temporary Services. Group Work. New York: Printed Matter, March 2007.
