= 6 (The Ex album) =

Box set by The Ex
- Released: 1991
- Genre: Anarcho-punk, Post-punk, Folk music, Jazz, Comedy, Rap music, Dance music

The Ex chronology
Treat (1990)	6 (1991)	Scrabbling at the Lock (1991)

6 is a collection of six singles by Dutch musical group The Ex. The singles were available in record shops and also through a subscription with a new one being issued every two months throughout 1991. Each of the singles explored different facets of The Ex's musical relationships and interests, featuring collaborations with an array of musicians and other artists. The 6 singles were not released on The Ex's CD collection, Singles. Period. The Vinyl Years 1980–1990 as they comprised an album to be collected and stored in a single box. The band announced plans to reissue the collection on CD in 2010, but have yet to do so.

== Packaging ==
Each of the 6 singles featured cover art riffing off an iconic image by Soviet constructivist artist Alexander Rodchenko. The 1924 original featured a portrait of Lilya Brik with hair pulled back under a bandanna and hand raised to her mouth, shouting "КНИГИ!" ("BOOKS!") The Ex maintained Rodchenko's format, swapping Brik out for each record's primary vocalist and filling in the record's song titles and issue number, 6.1 through 6.6, as the shouted text. The corners of each record's cover bore the band's name along with those of any guests appearing on the recording.

6.1 came in a paper shopping bag screenprinted with the image of a despised Dutch politician bearing the words, "This is an Amsterdam Scumbag". In addition to the record, the bag contained a Rodchenko-stylized die-cut box for storing all six 7-inch singles as they were released. Because 6.4 was a double 7", the box was filled up with the release of 6.5, and 6.6 revealed itself to be a 12" single, supplemental to the 7" box set. All the records were issued with various inserts, including booklets, buttons, leaflets, posters and stickers.

== Music ==
Every issue of 6 had a special theme. 6.1 bore two songs sung by Ex vocalist G.W. Sok and were characteristic of the band's music from that period. 6.2 featured vocals and saz by Brader Mûsîkî, a Kurdish musician based in the Netherlands. On 6.3, The Ex's drummer Kat Bornefeld stepped up to the mic to sing the Hungarian folk song "Hidegen Fújnak a Szelek" ("Cold Winds Are Blowing"), a song that also appeared on the band's first album with Tom Cora and became one of The Ex's most well-known songs.

The double 7" 6.4 had The Ex playing live with improvisational elements added by members of the Dog Faced Hermans and Amsterdam's Instant Composers Pool. 6.5 offered commentary on the dominance of the English language from Belgian comedians Kamagurka and Herr Seele, and 6.6. had The Ex exploring the genres of dance and rap music as was implied by the 12" single's format at the time.

== Rerelease ==
The Ex plans to reissue the 6 series on CD and digital download but have set no exact date for its rerelease.

== The Six 6 Singles ==
- 6.1 "Slimy Toad"/"Jake's Cake"
- 6.2 "Çemê Rynê"/"Millîtan" (with Brader Mûsîkî)
- 6.3 "Hidegen Fujnak A Szelek"/"She Said"
- 6.4 "Bimhuis 29/06/91" (with guests)
- 6.5 "This Song Is in English" (with Kamagurka and Herr Seele)
- 6.6 "Euroconfusion"/"Bird" in the Hand

== Personnel ==
The Ex

- Andy – guitar, violin
- G.W. Sok – vocals
- Kat – drums, steel drum
- Luc – bass, double bass
- Terrie – guitar

Guests

- Brader Mûsîkî – vocals and saz on 6.2
- Jeroen – sounds on 6.2 and 6.4
- Han Bennink – drums on 6.4
- Ab Baars – saxophone and clarinet on 6.4
- Wolter Wierbos – trombone on 6.4
- Colin McLean – bass guitar on 6.4
- Marion Coutts – trumpet on 6.4
- Wilf Plum – drums on 6.4
- Dorpsoudste de Jong – poetry on 6.4
- Herr Seele – flute, mandolin and violin on 6.4 and 6.5
- Johan De Smet – piano and organ on 6.5
- Kamagurka – vocals on 6.5

== Notes ==
- Cogan, Brian. Encyclopedia of Punk Music and Culture. Westport, Conn.: Greenwood Press, 2006. p. 70. ISBN 978-0-313-33340-8.
- Mount, Heather. "Three Looks into The Ex". In Crane, Larry. Tape Op: The Book about Creative Music Recording, Volume 2. Milwaukee: Hal Leonard Corporation, 2010. pp. 230–233.
- Robbins, Ira A., ed. The Trouser Press Guide to '90s Rock: The all-new 5th edition of The Trouser Press Record Guide. New York: Simon & Schuster, 1997. ISBN 0684814374.
- Sok, G.W. A Mix of Bricks & Valentines: Lyrics 1979–2009. New York: PM Press, 2011.
- Temporary Services. Group Work. New York: Printed Matter, March 2007.
