= Bert (comics) =

- Bert with his dog Bobje

Publication information
- Publisher: Humo (Belgium). Published by Loempia, Kritak, De Bezige Bij and Standaard Uitgeverij.
- First appearance: November 3, 1977
- Created by: Kamagurka

In-story information
- Full name: Bert Vanderslagmulders.
- Team affiliations: Bobje the dog.

Bert is a Belgian comic strip, written and drawn by Kamagurka, which appeared exclusively in the Flemish magazine HUMO since 1977. The cartoons have also been published in the Dutch magazine Vrij Nederland, the French magazine Charlie Hebdo and the US magazine RAW. The series' protagonist, Bert, is Kamagurka's most recognizable character.

== Concept ==
Bert is a middle-aged bespectacled man with a long nose who always wears a sweater and long trousers. His full name is Vanderslagmulders, but is seldom used in the series. He is a flat character, but does demonstrate absurd behaviour. In many cartoons he is giving absurd monologues, often with misanthropic comments.

In the early 1990s Bert received his own pet dog: Bobje ("Little Bob"). Bobje is an anthropomorphic dog with a human face. He is often seen walking on two feet or doing things only humans can. Despite all that he is unable to talk and still treats Bert as his master.

== History ==
Bert made his debut on November 3, 1977 in the magazine Humo. Originally the series was named Van Maerlantstraat 23, which was Kamagurka's home address at the time. During the late 1970s the comic sometimes was several pages long, but later it became a one-page gag-a-day comic.

== Status ==
Bert is one of Humo's mascots and therefore often used on magazine covers or other related merchandising. He was seen in animated form in the opening titles of Kamagurka and Herr Seele's TV sketch show Lava (1989). During the annual Rock Werchter rock festival in Werchter, Belgium, when weather allowed it, a meters high inflatable doll of Bert and Bobje was inflated during several of the festival's editions.

== Partial bibliography ==
- "Het Ruikt Hier Naar Onzin", Kritak, 1977.
- "Bert maakt het gezellig", Kritak, 1979.
- "Het Boeiende Leven der Sukkels", Uitgeverij De Harmonie, 1980.
- "Folklore en Wetenschap", Harmonie/Loempia, 1990.
- "Berts Bobje", Uitgeverij De Harmonie-Loempia, 1991
- "Bert en Bobje in 't groen", Jef Meert Uitgeverij, 1992.
- "Bert en enigszins Bobje", Jef Meert Uitgeverij, 1993.
- "Berts Brein", Uitgeverij De Harmonie-Loempia, 1994.
- "Bezige Bert", Uitgeverij Maarten Muntinga B.V., 1995.
- "Bert Begint", Uitgeverij Maarten Muntinga B.V., September 1997.
- "Bert & Bobje met vakantie!", Uitgeverij De Harmonie, December 1997.
- "Bert & Bobje in de problemen", Uitgeverij De Harmonie, 1998.
- "Bert en Bobje 2", Uitgeverij De Harmonie, 1998.
- "Broodje Bert", Rainbow Pockets, Uitgeverij Maarten Muntinga, 1998.
- "Beste Bert", Rainbow Pockets, 1999.
- "Het Boek van Bert" (The Book of Bert)", Uitgeverij Harmonie 2007.
- "De Terugkeer van Bert en Bobje", Uitgeverij De Bezige Bij, 2013.
