= Cowboy Henk =

Belgian comic strip series

Publication information
- Publisher: HUMO (Belgium). Published by Loempia, Kritak, De Bezige Bij and Standaard Uitgeverij.
- First appearance: September 24, 1981
- Created by: Kamagurka, Herr Seele.

Cowboy Henk is a Belgian absurd/surreal humour gag-a-day comic strip series drawn by Herr Seele and written by Kamagurka. It was originally published in the newspaper De Morgen, but later taken over by the magazine HUMO, in which it is still published today and for whom Henk is now their mascot. The series was in continuous syndication from 1981 until 2011. After the brief interruption it was continued again in the spring of 2013.

== History ==
In 1981 Kamagurka published a one-off long-run comic strip named Mijnheerke Plagiaat ("Mister Plagiarism"), in the Belgian newspaper Vooruit (later De Morgen). At the end of the story the main character Mr. Plagiaat decides to think up a comic character of his own, whom he names Cowboy Henk, in contrast to Zorro. On September 24, 1981 the first Cowboy Henk gag appeared in print. Kamagurka wrote the jokes and dialogue while his friend, Herr Seele, drew the stories.

Originally Cowboy Henk appeared in black-and-white as a gag-a-day comic of only four to six panels per episode. Sometimes he had adventures spread over more pages too. De Morgen received many angry letters from readers who complained about the style of comedy. In Flanders Cowboy Henk was published exclusively in the magazine HUMO from 1982 until 2011, usually as a single page gag-a-day page. He also appeared on many magazine covers, thus becoming one of HUMO 's official mascots. In October 2011, after nearly 30 years of continuous publication, the series was no longer published in HUMO and disappeared without fanfare. According to the redaction the series hardly got any reactions from readers anymore, even when publication was ceased. From that moment on until 2012 Seele drew the short-lived black-and-white comic strip Dikke Billie Walter ("Fat Billie Walter"), with Kamagurka as script writer. On April 10, 2013, the Flemish radio station Studio Brussel interviewed Seele and he announced Henk's comeback in HUMO. The character indeed reappeared. First as a gag cartoon, spread over an entire page and making topical comedy, later as a parody comic strip series of Belgian history until finally back in its old form as a comic strip.

The series has been translated into French (as Cowboy Maurice), Spanish, and English in magazines such as L'Echo des Savanes and RAW. In The Netherlands the comics are published in Vrij Nederland.

== Character ==
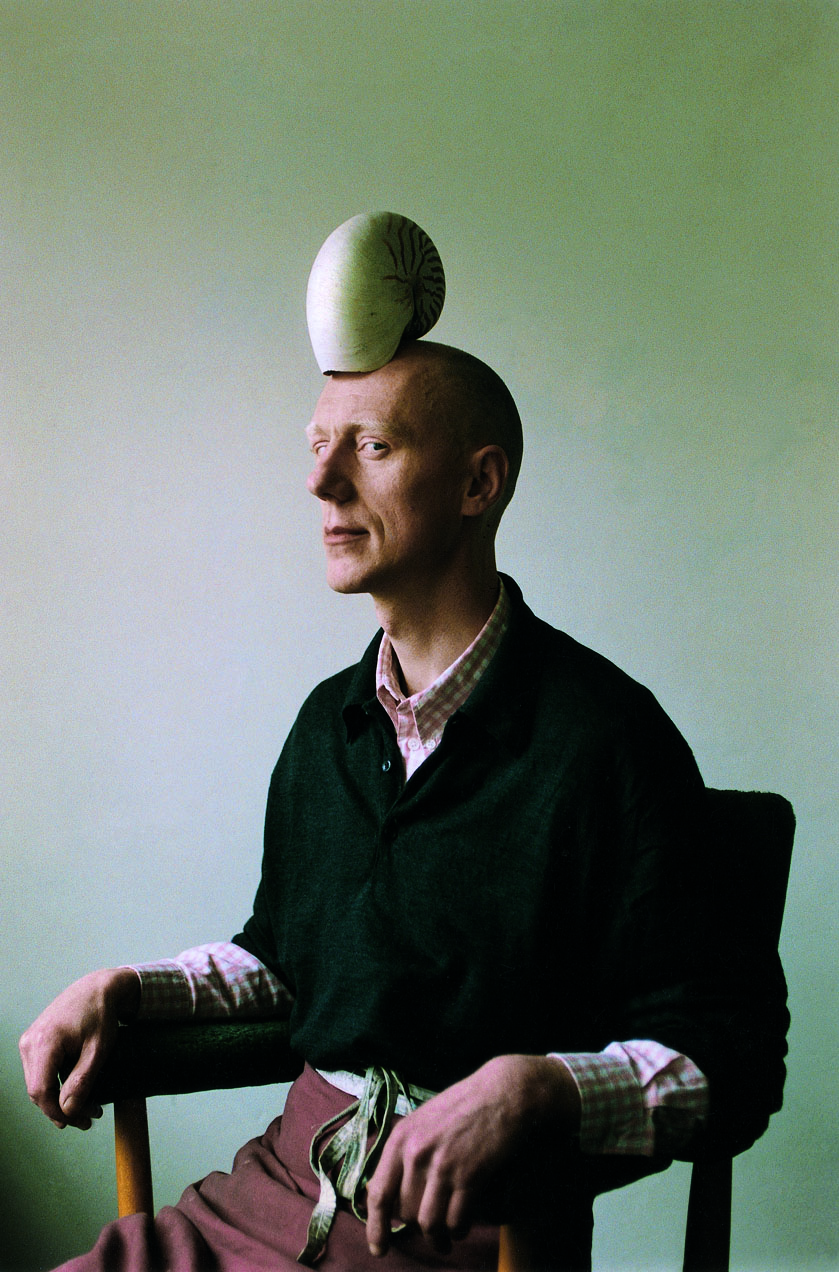
Herr Seele dressed as Cowboy Henk

Cowboy Henk is a muscular adult male with a characteristically brawny chin and a long yellow quiff which, according to the jubilee story De Bananenkuif (2001) is made from bananas. Usually Henk wears a white T-shirt with short sleeves, blue pants and black shoes with round noses. In his first gags Henk was a real cowboy, which explains his name.

Henk is a flat character and completely unpredictable. He often behaves in a bizarre way, but the world around him is also very surreal. He often reacts calmly to all the madness around him, but can get aggressive and even violent at times. Sometimes Henk behaves like a naïve child still living at his mother's place and going to school. In other gags he behaves more like an adult by going to work or experiencing with sex and drugs. Since Henk has had sex with both men and women in his cartoons we can conclude he is bisexual. He has no stable profession, despite the fact that some successive gags depict him as a journalist, hairdresser or a painter.

Henk is also the only recurring character. Other side characters only appear in a few gags, then disappear again.

== Style ==
Much like Kamagurka's other comics and cartoons Cowboy Henk is an absurd humor comic strip series, aimed at adults. Herr Seele told in interviews that Zippy the Pinhead by Bill Griffith was a major inspiration. Some Cowboy Henk gags have an almost child friendly atmosphere while others are full of shocking dirty jokes, toilet humour and/or black comedy. Because of the simple, naïve drawing style the series have been read by many children in HUMO over the years. This led to several angry letters by parents who complained about the child-unfriendly vulgarities in the comic strip.

== In other media ==
Occasional short animated cartoons featuring Henk were seen in Kamagurka and Seele's comedy TV series Lava and Johnnywood, with Seele voicing his character. He also performed Cowboy Henk (with a yellow quiff tied to his bald head) while Kamagurka told Henk's surreal adventures to the audience. In their radio show Studio Kafka they also made audio plays about Henk.

== Award ==
The series won the 2014 Prix du Patrimoine at the Angouleme International Comics Festival.

== In popular culture ==
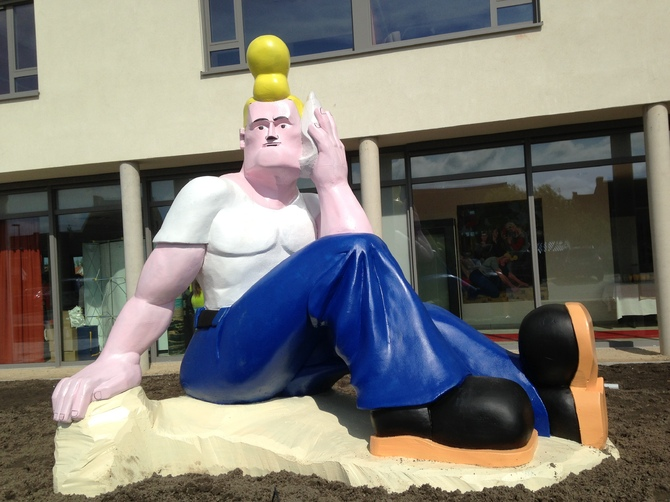
Cowboy Henk sculpture in Middelkerke

- Cartoonist Gal once drew a series of cartoons for the magazine Panorama/De Post (nowadays P-Magazine) which showed the news events of the years 1955–1984. For the year 1956 he drew a cartoon in which Elvis Presley dances amidst of all kinds of politicians and media phenomena of that year. In the left corner Cowboy Henk, jealous of Elvis' quiff, tries to turn over the page.
- Cowboy Henk can be seen on the album cover of "Steelt de Schouw!" (1994) for Pater Moeskroen, illustrated by Herr Seele himself. The character was also used on the cover of the record single "Zuster Angelique", "Le Plastique C'est Fantastique" and "Trek die Zak in Tweeën".
- Cowboy Henk also appeared on the cover and the illustrations of the book "Geheimzinnige Sterren: over de Belgische Strip" (1996) by Rik Pareit.
- Cowboy Henk had a guest role in the Kiekeboe album Bij Fanny op schoot (2005).
- Hij also had a cameo in the Urbanus comic strip album Het Pedo-Alarm (2012).
- In 2008 Seele made a painted wall next to the Sint-Martinusinstituut in Koekelare, designed by pupils of the institute themselves.
- In Kortrijk a bust of Henk can be seen since July 22, 2004. It's a sculpture made with plants, but has changed locations from the Vlamingstraat to the Oudenaardsesteenweg.
- In 2010, to celebrate the 30th anniversary of Cowboy Henk comics artists and cartoonists such as Willy Linthout, Zaza, Zak, Hector Leemans and Jonas Geirnaert drew special homages to the character.
- Cowboy Henk appears as a doctor in Raw's Narrative Corpse in 4 consecutive contributions.

== Publications ==
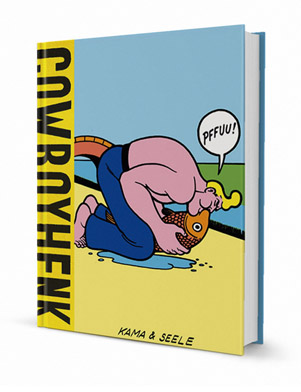
Compilation book of Cowboy Henk gag cartoons

=== Regular albums ===
- "De tintelende titel" (1982), Uitgeverij Kritak
- "Het geroken oor" (1982), Uitgeverij Kritak
- "Cowboy Henk zet door" (1983), Uitgeverij Kritak
- "'t Gekuifde kunstwerk" (1985), Uitgeverij De Harmonie
- "De paardenschenkers" (1986), Uitgeverij De Harmonie
- "Cowboy Henk in de Benelux" (1989), Uitgeverij De Harmonie
- "Cowboy Henk serveert" (1991), Uitgeverij De Harmonie/Loempia
- "Cowboy Henk maakt kennis!" (1993), Uitgeverij De Harmonie/Loempia
- "Cowboy Henk trakteert!" (1994), Uitgeverij De Harmonie/Loempia
- "De kappende kapper" (1998), Uitgeverij De Harmonie/De Standaard
- "De gierende gynaecoloog" (1998), Uitgeverij De Harmonie/De Standaard
- "Verscheurkalender 2002" (2001), Uitgeverij Infotex
- "Verscheurkalender 2003" (2002), Uitgeverij Infotex
- "In, onder en boven Oostende" (2005), De Bezige Bij
- "In de Far Out West" (2010), De Bezige Bij/Borgerhoff & Lamberigts

=== Compilation albums ===
- "De verzamelde werken, Deel 1" (2000), De Stripuitgeverij
- "De verzamelde werken, Deel 2" (2000), De Stripuitgeverij
- "De verzamelde werken, Deel 3" (2001), De Stripuitgeverij
- "De Bananenkuif: 20 jaar Cowboy Henk", (2001), De Stripuitgeverij
- "De verzamelde werken, Deel 4" (2002), De Stripuitgeverij
- "Cowboy Henk", (2012), Uitgeverij De Bezige Bij
