= Studio Kafka =

- Advertisement for the show
- Genre: Radio sketch comedy
- Running time: 55 minutes
- Country of origin: Belgium
- Language: Dutch
- Home station: Studio Brussel.
- Starring: Kamagurka, Herr Seele
- Produced by: Mark Coenen.
- Original release: January 7, 1995 – 1999.
- Sponsored by: Humo

Studio Kafka was a Flemish sketch comedy radio show presented on the radio station Studio Brussel between 1995 and 1999. It was presented by Belgian cartoonists Kamagurka and Herr Seele and aired each Sunday afternoon between 13.00 and 14.00 p.m.

== Historical background ==
Kamagurka and Herr Seele were well known cartoonists in the Flemish magazine Humo, who had already made stage shows, novelty singles and television series during the 1980s and 1990s before their own radio show on Studio Brussel aired. Just like these past endeavours Studio Kafka was full with absurd comedy sketches, some of them based on earlier material. Kamagurka intercut these sketches with songs and atmospheric music from his personal record collection.

Some of their assistants, Gunter Lamoot, Piet De Praitere and Bart Vanneste had previously won the Grote Prijs W.P. Stutjens, a contest for new comedy talent. Kamagurka was one of the jury members and hired them as co-actors on the show. In 1999 Flemish singer Eddy Wally was co-host.

== Recurring items ==
The show was notable for several recurring segments, among them Kamiel Kafka, an absurd philosopher and poet whom Kamagurka had already played during stage and television shows. Kamagurka also narrated the adventures of Cowboy Henk, while Herr Seele did the voice of Henk. Piet de Praitere presented a segment called "Etienne met het Open Verhemelte" ("Etienne with the Open Palate"), in which the character Etienne is unable to make himself understandable to listeners due to his condition.

Another recurring item was De Tactloze Top 100 ("The Tactless Top 100"), a parody on hitparade music, where Kamagurka played bizarre music by acts like Frank Zappa, The Residents, Barnes & Barnes and his own novelty singles. In 2000 a compilation CD with Kama's music from "De Tactloze Top 100" was released.

== Spin-offs ==
The 2002 radio program Kamagurkistan was a similar show. It was also presented on Studio Brussel between 13:00 and 14:00 and similar in absurdic style, but with a different co-host, Tomas De Soete.
