= Treat (album) =

Studio album (split) by The Ex and Dog Faced Hermans
- Released: 1990
- Genre: Punk rock
- Label: Demon Radge

The Ex chronology
Joggers and Smoggers (1988)	Treat (1990)	6 (1991)

Dog Faced Hermans chronology
Everyday Timebomb (1989)	Treat (1990)	Mental Blocks for All Ages (1991)

Treat is a split cassette shared between by Dutch punk band The Ex and Scottish ex-pat tour mates Dog Faced Hermans. The album was recorded live while the two bands toured Europe together and was released only on cassette in 1990. That year the two bands also collaborated on the single "Lied der Steinklopfer" ("Stonestamper's Song") released under the name Ex Faced Hermans, as well as sharing live sound engineer Gert-Jan, credited as a full member of the Dog Faced Hermans who continued to tour with The Ex for more than a decade.

The following year the Dog Faced Hermans took time off and Hermans guitarist Andy Moor joined The Ex.

== Track listing ==
=== Side 1: Dog Faced Hermans ===
1. New Shoots
2. Confrontation
3. Beautiful
4. Supressa
5. Bella Ciao
6. Too Much for the Red Ticker
7. Timebomb
8. Mary Houdini
9. John Henry
10. The Blantyre Exposlosion

=== Side 2: The Ex ===
1. Elvis & I
2. Mousetrap
3. No More Cigars
4. Meanwhile, at McDonnas
5. Shopping Street
6. Tin Gods
7. The State of Freedom
8. The Early Bird's Worm
9. She Said
10. Stonestamper's Song
11. Dead Fish

== Personnel ==
=== Dog Faced Hermans ===
- Marion Coutts - vocals, trumpet
- Colin Mclean - bass guitar
- Wilf Plum - drums
- Andy Moor (The Ex) - guitar
- Gert-Jan - live sound

=== The Ex ===
- G.W. Sok - vocals
- Terrie Ex - guitar
- Luc Ex - bass guitar
- Kat Ex - drums
- Gert-Jan - live sound
