= Rats live on no evil star =

Rats live on no evil star is a palindrome used in several works. It may refer to:

- Initial appearance in Swords of Lankhmar, first published 1968, by Fritz Leiber
- Rats Live on No Evil Star is a poem by Anne Sexton that appears in her 1974 collection The Death Notebooks
- The Rat Poems: Or, Rats Live On No Evil Star, a 1978 book by Peter Meinke
- Rats Live on no Evil Star, a 1996 demo album by Anyone (band)
- Rats Live on No Evil Star, a story in Tales of Pain and Wonder, a 2000 short story collection by Caitlín R. Kiernan
- No Evil Star, a 2002 film by Marion Coutts
- Ratsliveonnoevilstar, a 2003 EP by Annie Clark
- Rats Live On No Evil Star, a 2011 song by Ringo Deathstarr
