= Herman Selleslags =

Belgian photographer (1938–2024)

Herman Selleslags (3 March 1938 – 18 October 2024) was a Belgian photojournalist, mainly working for the magazine Humo.

== Life and career ==
Selleslags was born in Antwerp in 1938. His father, Rik Selleslags, was a photojournalist as well. Herman Selleslags started working as a photographer in the 1950s, first making commercial photos for companies, and later working as a photographer for Humo, where he portrayed many celebrities. This includes portraits of the Beatles, Mick Jagger, Ike and Tina Turner, and Diana Ross. His archive and that of his father are kept at the Fotomuseum Antwerp.

In 1991, he received the State Award for Visual Arts from the Flemish Community. In 2007, the Fotomuseum Antwerpen dedicated a large retrospective to his work. In 2024, Aldine Reinink directed Life Will Give You Pictures, an 80-minute documentary about Selleslags' life.

Selleslags was married to Sonja Cantré, the daughter of sculptor Jozef Cantré. Sonja was a television presenter. They had two children. Cantré died in 2014. Selleslags died on 18 October 2024 via euthanasia. He was 86.
