= Joggers and Smoggers =

Studio album by The Ex
- Released: 1989
- Recorded: June 8–25, 1989
- Studio: ADM's Koeienverhuurbedrijf (Amsterdam)
- Genre: Experimental rock; art punk; free improvisation; no wave; folk; world music
- Length: 1:32:14
- Label: Fist Puppet Records
- Producer: Dolf Planteijdt

The Ex chronology
Aural Guerilla (1988)	Joggers and Smoggers (1989)	Treat (1990)

Professional ratings
Review scores
Source	Rating
AllMusic	4/5 stars
Tom Hull	B+

Joggers and Smoggers is a double album by punk artists the Ex, released in 1989 as a double vinyl record album, and issued as a double CD in 1992. It is the first of the Ex's albums to feature extensive use of improvisation and instruments outside of the standard guitar/bass/drums arrangement of punk rock, as well as great numbers of international guest musicians, most notably New York's Sonic Youth, Glasgow's Dog Faced Hermans, Amsterdam's Instant Composers Pool, as well as numerous folk musicians from a variety of European and Middle Eastern traditions. The album marked a turning point in the Ex's artistry, foreshadowing many collaborations and delvings into avant-garde, experimental, improvisational, folk and world music that the band would mix with their abrasive trademark post-punk sound in the 20 years to come.

== Reception ==
Dean McFarlane of AllMusic called the album the groups's "magnum opus" and it was selected as the sole highlight of the Ex's discography. He wrote that the sessions were similar to "the extended collages of the Crass albums, whereby the sessions were not strictly performed by the entire group, but were in fact collections of solo tapes, ad-hoc collaborations, and improvised sketches. There are plenty of full-throttle Ex avant-punk tracks, however, and collaborators include numerous players from the free improvisation world, as well as members of Sonic Youth, who contribute their parts by tape and even apparently via telephone on one piece featuring Kim Gordon." He wrote that the album "marks a turning point in the group's sound; from this point they would embrace more fully the aesthetics and methods of avant-garde jazz, free improvisation, and delicate European folk. Over the four sides, this is an excellent introduction to the labyrinthine world of one of the most inspired and inventive groups in European post punk." According to Trouser Press, the album "reroutes the music from its usual head-on collision and spotlights a few guests. [...] While tracks like "Shopping Street" are brash cacophony, others are far more restrained."

Many reviewers now consider the album to be one of the band's best or as a possible starting point for listeners unfamiliar with the band's discography.

== Track listing ==
1. "Humm (The Full House Mumble)" – 2:48
2. "At the Gate" – 3:08
3. "Pigs and Scales" – 2:34
4. "Coughing" – 2:05
5. "Morning Star" – 2:22
6. "Wall Has Ears" – 1:55
7. "Invitation to the Dance" – 5:03
8. "Tightly Stretched" – 2:35
9. "Ask the Prisoner" – 1:12
10. "To Be Clear" – 2:06
11. "Gentlemen" – 2:53
12. "Make That Call" – 1:47
13. "The Buzzword Medley" – 5:07
14. "Shopping Street" – 2:12
15. "Crackle Engines Vrôp Vrôp" – 6:57
16. "Greetings from Urbania" – 0:52
17. "Wired" – 1:13
18. "Got Everything?" – 2:10
19. "Waarom Niet" – 1:40
20. "Courtyard" – 2:14
21. "Burst! Crack! Split!" – 0:59
22. "Brickbat" – 2:59
23. "Hieronymus" – 1:25
24. "Nosey Parker" – 0:54
25. "People Who Venture" – 3:54
26. "Watch the Driver" – 1:52
27. "Let's Get Sceptical" – 3:50
28. "Tin Gods" – 2:33
29. "The State of Freedom" – 5:33
30. "Provisionally Untitled" – 2:59
31. "Kachun-K Pschûh" – 3:42
32. "The Early Bird's Worm" – 3:48
33. "Catkin" – 1:24
34. "Upstairs with Picasso" – 3:29

== Personnel ==
Adapted from liner notes:

=== The Ex ===
- Terrie – guitar
- G.W. Sok – vocals
- Luc – bass
- Katrin – drums, vocals

Additional instruments: grill, birdcage, double-bass, "fire extinguisher + hammer", bamboos, piano, electric razor, dobro, spoons, human beatbox, wire, glass, castanets, bow, cracklebox, cowbells, cabasa.

=== Guest musicians ===
- Wilf Plum – organ (track: 2), drums (tracks: 3, 21, 24), birdcage (track: 3), voice (track: 12), bodhrán (track: 23), kabassa (track: 26), bamboos (track: 27), spoons (track: 32), backing vocals (track: 31)
- Jeroen – birdcage (track: 3), voice (tracks: 12, 23), backing-vocals (track: 31), piano-sequencer (track: 12), "various soundscapes"
- Dolf – guitar (track: 2), acoustic guitar (track: 5), vocals (track: 24), "space-stations" (track: 26)
- Ab Baars – saxophones (tracks: 14, 15, 18, 32, 34)
- Bram – guitar (tracks: 10, 34)
- Doan Gurkensalat – saz (track: 9)
- Dorpsoudste de Jong – vocals (tracks: 1, 19)
- Ferrie Meurkerrie – trumpets, trombones (track: 22)
- Floris van Manen – "control-program" "orkaterdrum" (track: 20)
- Gabi Kenderesi – voice, violin (track: 16)
- Gerhard Bornefeld – piano (track: 33)
- Harry Roberts – bamboos (track: 27), backing-vocals (track: 31)
- Jeroen de Groot – bagpipes (tracks: 2, 7)
- Lee Ranaldo – guitar (track: 8)
- Lena – accordion, vocals (track: 20)
- Nick Hobbs – vocals (track: 27), announcement (track: 25)
- Thurston Moore – guitar (track: 11)
- Thijs Vermeulen – bass (tracks: 6,17,21)
- Wolter Wierbos – trombone (tracks: 14, 15, 18, 32)

== Notes ==
- Cogan, Brian. Encyclopedia of Punk Music and Culture. Westport, Conn.: Greenwood Press, 2006. p. 70. ISBN 978-0-313-33340-8.
- Mount, Heather. "Three Looks into The Ex". In Crane, Larry. Tape Op: The Book about Creative Music Recording, Volume 2. Milwaukee: Hal Leonard Corporation, 2010. pp. 230–233.
- Robbins, Ira A., ed. The Trouser Press Guide to '90s Rock: The all-new 5th edition of The Trouser Press Record Guide. New York: Simon & Schuster, 1997. ISBN 0684814374.
- Sok, G.W. A Mix of Bricks & Valentines: Lyrics 1979–2009. New York: PM Press, 2011.
- Temporary Services. Group Work. New York: Printed Matter, March 2007.
