= Filmography =

List of films related by some criteria

A filmography is a list of films related by some criteria. For example, an actor's career filmography is the list of films they have appeared in; a director's comedy filmography is the list of comedy films directed by a particular director.

Filmographies are not limited to associations with particular people. For example, the Handbook of American Film Genres (1988, ISBN 0-313-24715-3) includes "19 substantive essays on major American film genres," each accompanied by a "valuable selected filmography." In 1998, the University of Washington sponsored a university-wide "All Powers Project" which assembled a filmography of films related to the Cold War Red Scare, which consisted of "motion pictures that played a role in fueling the Red Scare, in propagandizing the threat of Communism and in a few rare and rather veiled cases, in standing up to the charges of the House Committee on Un-American Activities."

Another example is the filmography published by a library director at Brigham Young University–Idaho of over 500 films "that in some significant or memorable way include a library or librarian," a filmography assembled to better understand Hollywood's stereotypes of librarians. The Georgia Department of Economic Development, whose responsibilities include promoting film production in the U.S. state of Georgia, maintains a filmography of such films.
