= Pater Moeskroen =

Dutch folk band

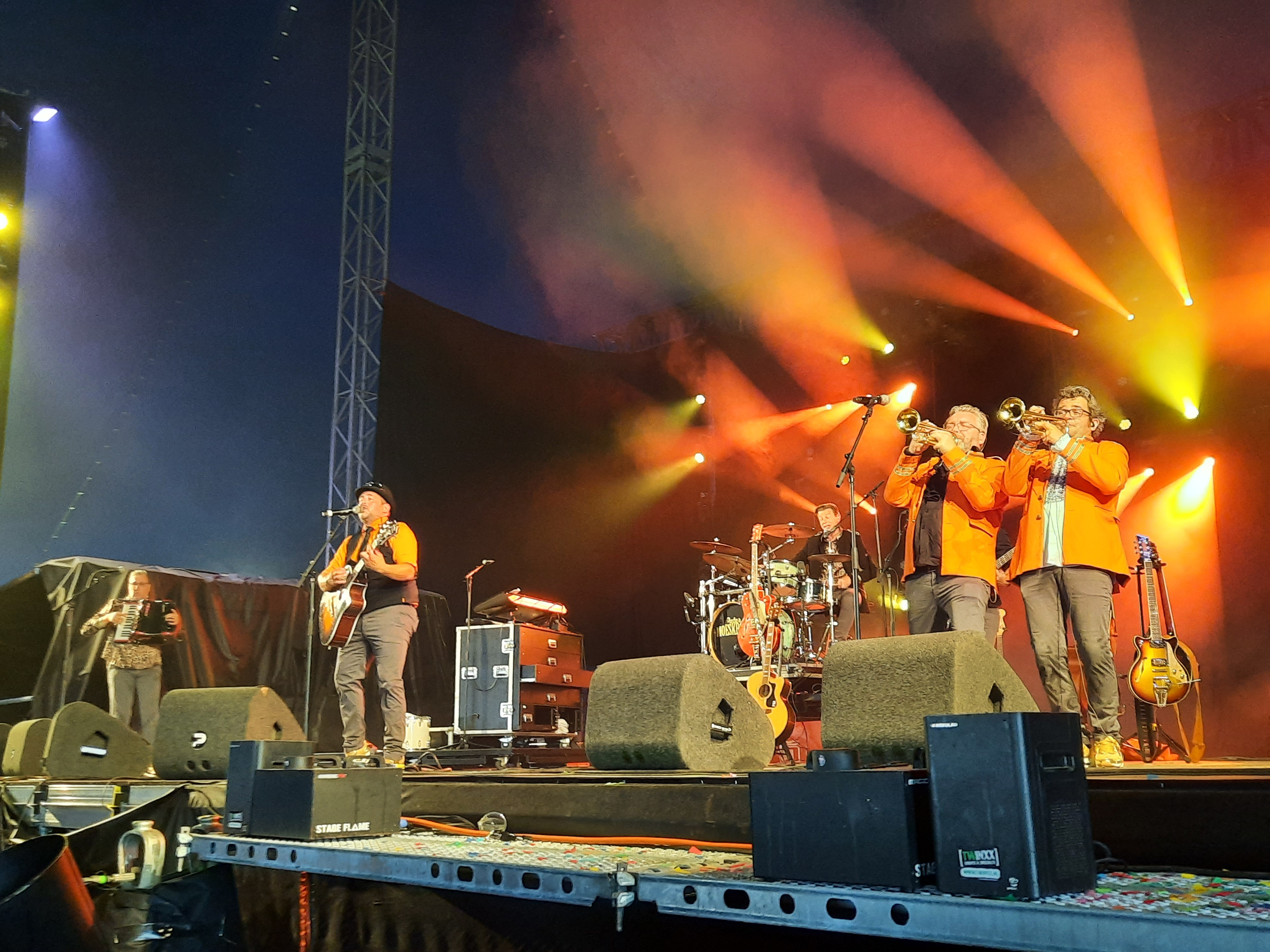
Pater Moeskroen at the Zwarte Cross festival in July, 2022

Pater Moeskroen is a Dutch folk group. During the summer they tour the country to play at festivals and big parties; in the winter the band plays in theaters throughout the Netherlands. The band's music contains elements of folk, klezmer, Celtic but also punk influences. Therefore, the band have created their own music style and sound. The content of the lyrics ranges from humorous to very serious.

== Biography ==
In August 1985, three of its founding - members Martien van Oostrom, Adje Grooten and Wilbert van Duinhoven - were touring in France as street musicians. On their way back to the Netherlands, they decided to create a new type of beer and driving along the Belgian city of Moeskroen the idea of Pater Moeskroen (Father Moeskroen) was born. The beer idea was changed into the idea of starting a band with this name. Van Oostrom and Grooten asked their study friends Ton Smulders and Marcel Sophie to join and to complete the band they asked housemate Jan Evers to play the whistles. On January 26, 1986, the first gig was there, in Café van Zanten in Amersfoort. They only had two rehearsals before this gig and their credo was "no rehearsals, just play!".

In 1988, a cassette "Alle 7 tips" was released and all 1000 tapes were sold. At that time the band has a very good image as live performers. In 1989 their first CD is released which is a live recording of a show. This CD is also heard by Dutch producer Peter Koelewijn and he had big plans with the song "Roodkapje", a 1991 interpretation of the fairytale Little Red Riding Hood. This song ended up high in the Dutch charts and the follow-up single "Hela Hola" was a small success as well. At that time, Koert Ligtermoet had joined the band as drummer. After some discussions around the way to go, the band and Peter Koelewijn decided to quit the cooperation.

Pater Moeskroen released after this split another single named Werken is ongezond ("working is unhealthy"), a number which was boycotted from the Dutch radio due to the idea that this song would harm the laborers' morality. Their first award was the Gouden Notenkraker in 1993, which is an award for the best live performing bands.

The band makes more CDs and keeps performing in the party circuit. This circuit doesn't give the band to bring more serious songs nor do they bring a modest song in party tents. The band decided to start up a theater tour in 1995 with the show "Psalmenstrand". They received a lot of criticism for this, a party band does not belong in theater. The band proved with a good show that they can handle theater. On the end of that tour, Drumplayer Koert Ligtermoet left the band and was replaced by Thomas Gerretsen. From that time on, the band plays in the party circuit in summer and in the theater circuit in winter.

The following shows Wilde Liefde ("Wild Love"), Spanning en Spinazie ("Suspense and Spinach") and (on)gewenste Ultimiteiten ("(un)wanted Extremities") did well in the theaters. The Ultimiteitentour was also played in Belgium. This tour was also the last tour for the flute-player Jan Evers, who decided to do more cabaret instead of playing music. His successor, Jeroen Goossens, came from Flairck. From here on out the band cooperates with director Dick Hauser. The show got a concept model with a theme. "Diddelidee" was based on Ireland and became a bestseller with more than 70 performances. The follow-up was "Sprookjes" with the theme fairy-tales. This show was also recorded on DVD as a farewell gift to leaving members Ton Smulders and Wilbert van Duinhoven. Bart Swerts was the new member on bass guitar. Their show "ZEE" was also a success and was also recorded on DVD.

In 2006, Jeroen Goossens left the band and was replaced by Vincent van Lent. In that year the band celebrated their 20th anniversary with a gig and the first part of their anniversary CDs : XX part 1. In July, the band will play an anniversary weekend in Nieuwveen and release XX part 2. They have already planned a new theater show called "Nu" which will be played in 38 theaters throughout The Netherlands.

== Members ==
- Ton Smulders (vocals, guitar, bass, tuba, sousaphone and charango) 1985–2004
- Adje Grooten (vocals, guitar, banjo, mandolin, flutes, saxophone, cittern en bagpipes) 1985–2012
- Marcel Sophie (vocals en percussion) 1985–now
- Jan Evers (vocals, flutes, saxophone, clarinet, and Tin whistle) 1985–2000
- Wilbert van Duinhoven (vocals, bass, accordion, Trombone and guitar) 1985–2004
- Martien van Oostrom (vocals, drums, keyboard and accordion) 1985–now
- Koert Ligtermoet (drums) 1989–1996
- Thomas Gerretsen (vocals, drums, percussion and xylophone) 1996–now
- Jeroen Goossens (vocals, flutes, bassoon, saxophone, clarinet, Tin whistle, pan flute, Ocarina, shakuhachi and other) 2000–2006
- Bart Swerts (vocals, bass, double bass, guitar and harmonica) 2004–now
- Vincent van Lent (flute, Tin whistle, trumpet, flugelhorn, trombone, saxophone, mandolin, banjo, guitar, keyboard en vocals) 2006–now
