= Kamagurka =

Cartoonist, playwright, television producer

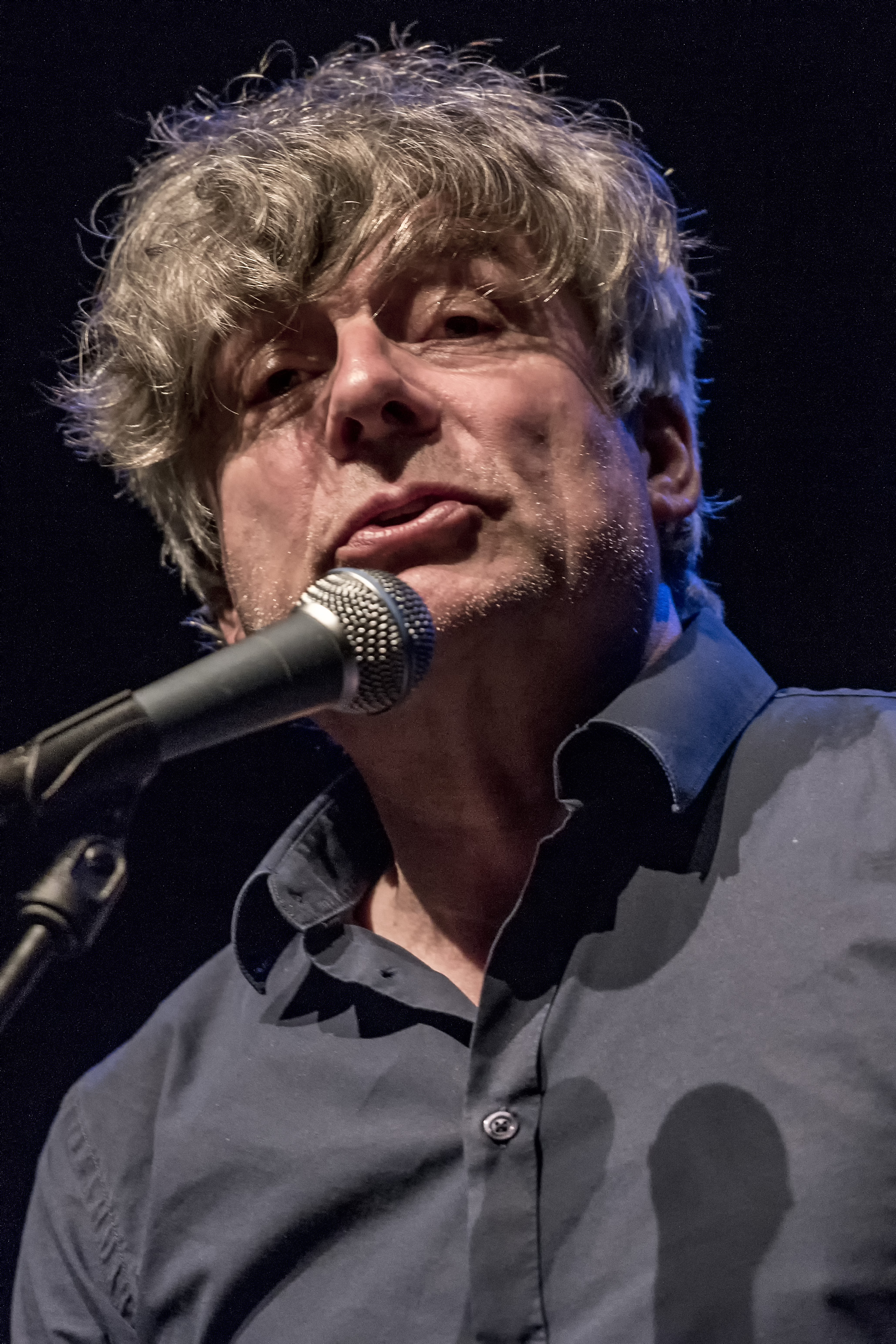
- Kamagurka in 2018
- Born: Luc Zeebroek; 5 May 1956 (age 70); Nieuwpoort, Belgium
- Known for: Bert, Cowboy Henk.
- Style: Absurd humor
- Website: www.kamagurka.com

Luc Zeebroek (born 5 May 1956), better known as Kamagurka, is a Belgian cartoonist, playwright, comic strip artist, painter, comedian, comedic singer and television producer, known for the absurd nature of his work. He created various comic strip characters, but "Bert" is the most well known. He also writes the scenarios for Herr Seele's comic strip, Cowboy Henk.

== Early life and education ==
Luc Zeebroek was born on 5 May 1956 in Nieuwpoort in Belgium.

Kamagurka studied art in Bruges. and later at the Royal Academy of Fine Arts in Ghent. However, he left school before he graduated.

During a school trip in Paris, Kamagurka decided to visit the editorial building of the magazine Hara Kiri on his own. Only twenty years old at the time, he ended up going there every two weeks to stay there for three days. Kamagurka still believes this to be his true education and the foundation for the rest of his career.

== Career ==
In 1972 he made his debut as a cartoonist for De Zeewacht. Three years later he became the regular cartoonist at the weekly magazine HUMO, where he introduced cartoons inspired by the absurd and shocking works of Robert Crumb, Roland Topor and the controversial French magazine Hara Kiri. In those first years the magazine received dozens of angry letters from people who didn't understand or enjoy his work, which they deemed "too vulgar". This transformed him into a cult artist. He remains the house cartoonist for Humo to this day, despite other cartoonists being published there as well.

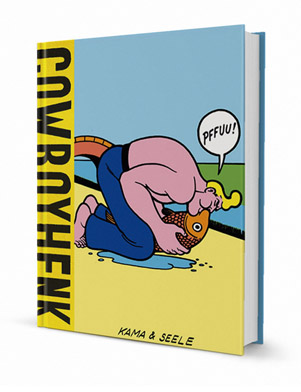
Cowboy Henk

From the 1980s he also made a few cartoons with Herr Seele, with whom he also made several radio (Studio Kafka, Kamagurkistan) and television shows (like Lava, Johnnywood, Wees blij met wat je hebt and Bob en George). Since 1981 they have produced the comic Cowboy Henk, with Kamagurka writing the jokes and Seele making the drawings.

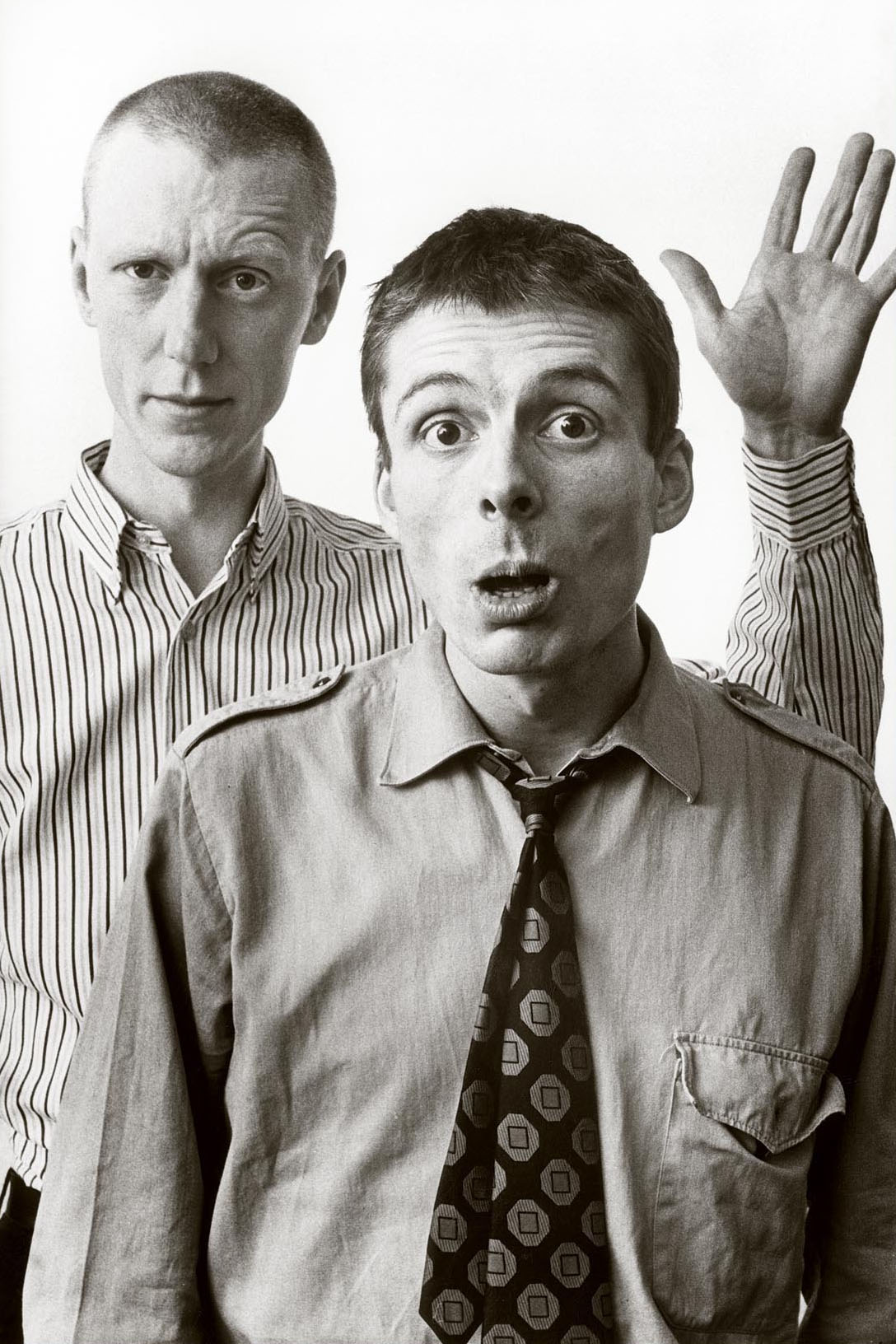
Herr Seele and Kamagurka in 1982

Kamagurka also paints and performs theater throughout Flanders and The Netherlands.

He has made music since the beginning of the 80s with singles including "Constant Degoutant", "Marjoleintje", "Een klein leger, maar een dik leger" (1981) and one censured by national radio: "Weg met Boudewijn. Leve Fabiola" ("Boudewijn go home! Long live Fabiola!"). They called themselves Kamagurka en de Vlaamse Primitieven. In 2000 he released a new album called Oh Sabrina, wat heb je met mijn snor gedaan? with singles including the title song and "Nee, mijn lief: je bent niet te dik." He has also designed album covers for Raymond van het Groenewoud and his own work.

In 1985 he received the Geuzenprijs for his entire oeuvre.

Since 2002 he has made weekly guest appearances on De Laatste Show. In 2005 he also created a theater production with Jules Deelder, Kamadeeldra.

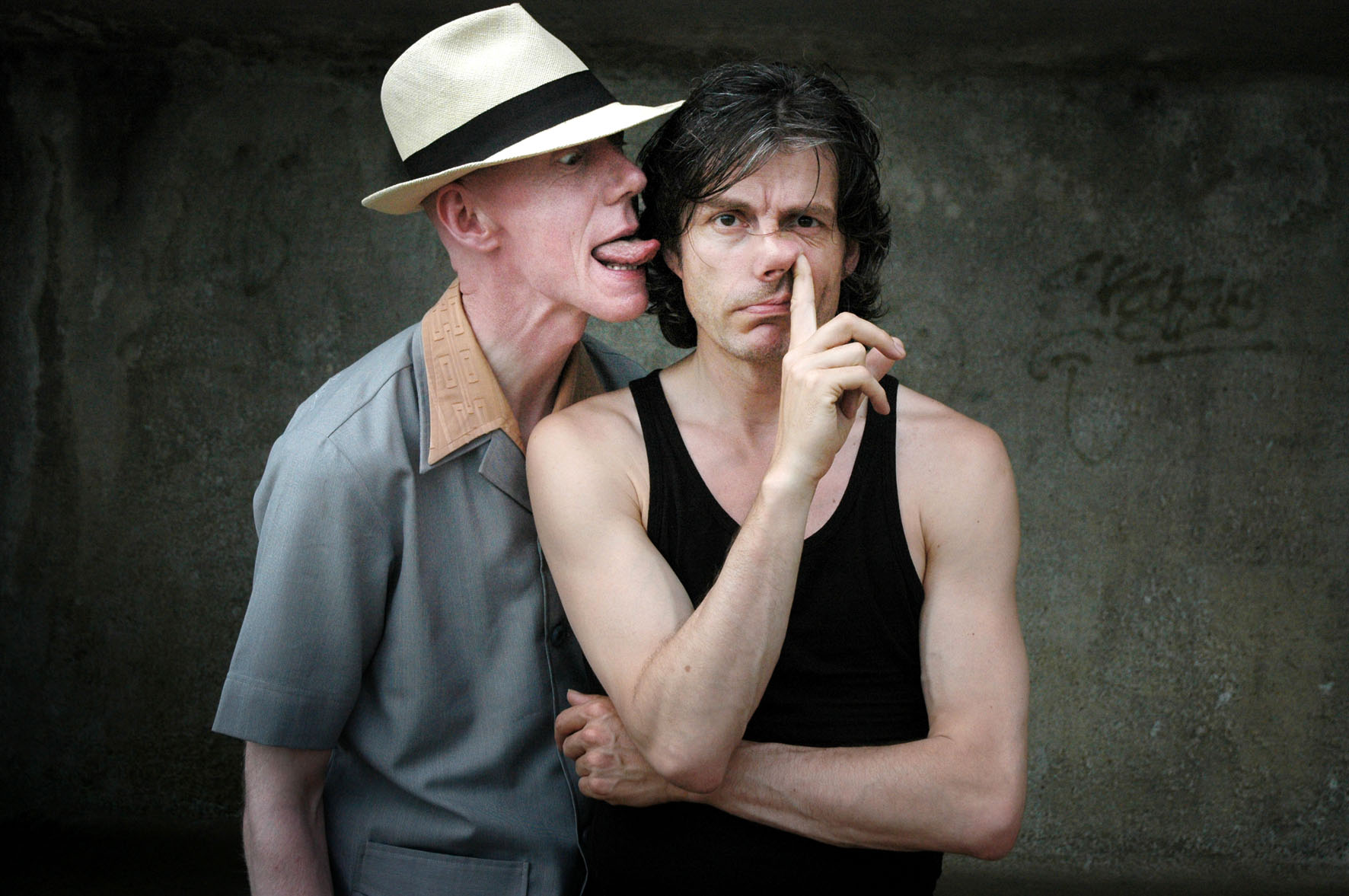
Herr Seele and Kamagurka in 2004

Since 2006 he has been making segments for the TV show Man bijt Hond with the weekly shorts "De grens".

== Personal life ==
Kamagurka's son Boris is a musician working under the name Bolis Pupul.

== Paintings ==
During the Kamalmanak project he started to make short movies for the Dutch digital site NRC TV. While filming one of these short films he invented a new art movement called Accidentalism ("Accidentally made"). He created a portrait of an unknown person, as he saw them with his own eyes. Afterwards he asked people on camera which person this man or woman on the painting resembled, and strangely enough, each time there was someone who could prove this likeness by showing a photo.

In 2008 Kamagurka made a project called Kamalmanak, in which he made a painting daily, making a total of 366 because 2008 was a leap-year. It is also the title of the book that showcases these paintings. The project was sponsored by businessman Marc Coucke, member of the management of the company Omega Pharma. Coucke is an art lover and a fan of Zeebroek. In these paintings Kamagurka tries to look at the world with a measure of absurd humor. He was inspired by various art movements, such as cubism and pop-art. His intention was to make his international breakthrough.

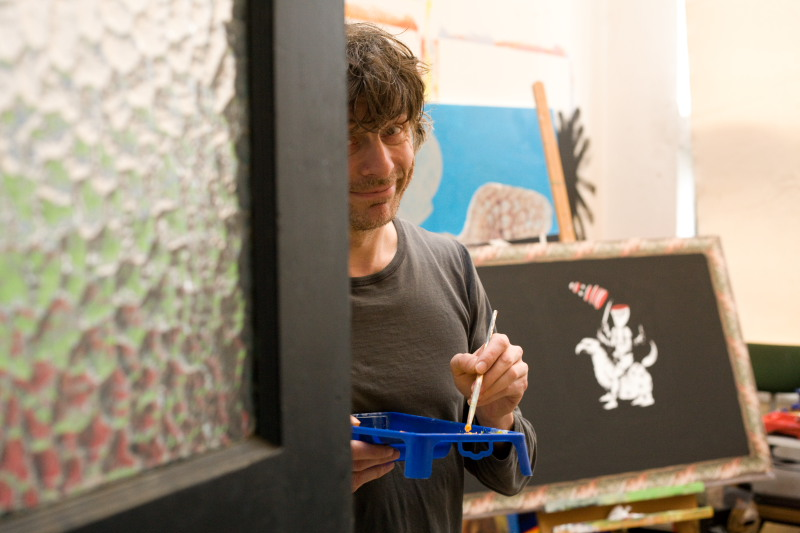
Kamagurka in 2008

After this he kept painting in the same absurdits style, but with the slight difference that while he kept doing it every day, he didn't necessarily finish a painting each time. He made a series he called Veluxart, named because he always painted close to a roof window. He painted a number of comic book characters (such as Tintin, The Smurfs, and Batman) and cartoon characters (Mickey Mouse, Goofy, Popeye, Fred Flintstone, and Mijnheer de Uil) in a style he nicknamed Neo-cubism. He tried to imagine how Picasso, Georges Braque or Juan Gris would have treated these subjects.

Another series were the Spiegeleipaintings (Fried egg paintings: a chicken upon the yolk of a fried egg). He continued with this theme, modifying the chicken by i.e. three crosses on Golgotha or by drawing another fried egg.

He also made an official portrait of Queen Beatrix with beard stubble. This is, according to the painter, because "a queen changes into a king if you wait long enough." In other paintings, he is strongly influenced by Piet Mondriaan or Peter Paul Rubens, or he uses the theme of another painter to create an original work, such as Le Déjeuner sur l'herbe by Édouard Manet, which he transformed into Déjeuner sous l'herbe.

== Trivia ==
- Since 1978 he has won without interruption the annual trophy for Best Graphic Artist, elected by the readers of the magazine HUMO. In 2010 he was beaten for the first time by Jonas Geirnaert. He ended number 4 in the top-10.
- In the comic strip series The Adventures of Nero by Marc Sleen, in "De Smaragdgroene Pletskop" a colonel appears with the name "Kamagurka" (line 71).
- The group Osdorp Posse sampled a part of Kamagurka's Kamiel Kafka performances in their song "Sam Sam" from their album Tegenstrijd (2003).
- Since his youth Kamagurka has been a fan of the football club KV Oostende, and is part of the team's board of directors. He designed the club's mascot. In 2009 he was banned from the team's stadium for three months because he had entered the playing field during a match in March of that year.

== Honours and awards ==
- (Belgium) Bronzen Adhemar (1978)
- (Belgium) Louis Paul Boonprijs (1978)
- (Belgium) Humo's Pop Poll - Best Cartoonist (1978->2010)
- (Belgium) Geuzenprijs (1985)
- (Netherlands) Stripschapprijs (1993)
- Press Cartoon Prize Belgium (2001)
- (Germany) Sondermann Bernd-Pfarr-Sonderpreis (2009)
- (France) Angoulême Prize for Inheritance (2014)
- (Netherlands) Inktspotprijs (2021)
