= Aural Guerrilla =

Studio album by The Ex
- Released: 1988
- Recorded: Mar 1–7, 1988
- Studio: Studio Suite 16, Rochdale, England
- Genres: Anarcho punk; post-punk; art punk; industrial
- Length: 40:15
- Labels: Ex Records; Homestead Records
- Producer: Jon Langford

The Ex chronology
Too Many Cowboys (1987)	Aural Guerrilla (1988)	Joggers and Smoggers (1989)

Aural Guerrilla is the 1988 studio album by Dutch anarchist post-punk band The Ex, co-released by American indie label Homestead Records.

== Recording ==
Wanting a different sound, The Ex recorded Aural Guerrilla in Rochdale, England instead of their home studio in the Netherlands, and returned to work with The Mekons' Jon Langford who had previously produced the band's 1983 album, Tumult. As inspiration for the album, the band would retire to Langford's house in Leeds after each day of recording and rewatch a videocassette of televised vaudeville routines performed by Spike Jones and his City Slickers from the 1950s.

The Ex completed 10 songs, nine originals, plus a cover of Peter Hammill's "A Motorbike in Afrika" from his 1978 album The Future Now.

The song Evolution(?) features allusions to the Chumbawamba song Liberation from the Revolution EP

== Release ==
Aural Guerrilla was released in 1988 on the band's own Ex Records in Europe and in the United States on indie rock label Homestead Records making it The Ex's first studio album to be widely distributed in the North America. The album's central cover image is that of a gorilla yawning, suggesting the homonymous pun with the album's title, "oral gorilla."

As with The Ex's previous album, Too Many Cowboys, the band packed the record sleeve with inserts, a set of four giant double-sided posters designed by eight different graphic artists. Another large poster contained the record's lyrics and included a reduction of the album’s cover art formatted to the size of an audio cassette accompanied by a note encouraging fans to duplicate and distribute it because “home-taping saves money."

Aural Guerrilla was re-issued on CD in 1993 by Ex Records in the Netherlands and by Fist Puppet in the U.S. The Greek label Di Di Music also reissued the album on vinyl.

== Reception ==
Professional ratings
Review scores
Source	Rating
AllMusic	3/5 stars
Tom Hull	B+

Trouser Press was highly positive of the album, calling it "an evocative and tightly crimped knot about a variety of righteous causes. A bracing blast of barbed wire guitar delivered at reasonable speed with clear (but passionate) vocals, Aural Guerrilla is one of the Ex's best; potent highlights include the pro-animal ecology of "Evolution (?)," the anti-rock-star venom of "Meanwhile at McDonna's" and "Welcome to the Asylum," an attack on Holland's shoddy treatment of refugees." An unattributed review of the album on the band's official website calls it "[p]owerful, strong punk, with a bit of an industrial edge, and as always, inspiring lyrics."

== Track listing ==
1. "Headache by Numbers" - 2:34
2. "Fashionation" - 4:02
3. "2.2" - 2:57
4. "Carcass" - 5:12
5. "Welcome to the Asylum" - 4:17
6. "Meanwhile at McDonna's" - 2:58
7. "Shooting-Party" - 2:20
8. "Evolution(?)" - 4:38
9. "A Motorbike in Afrika" - 7:12
10. "Godgloeiendeteringklootzak" - 4:01

== Personnel and recording ==
- Terrie (guitar)
- G.W. Sok (vocals)
- Luc (bass)
- Katrin (drums)
- Nicolette (guitar, whistles, mouth-organ)
- Ferrie Meurkerrie (trumpet on "Fashionation")
- Harry (percussion on "A Motorbike In Afrika")
- Dolf Planteijdt (guitar on "2.2")

== Notes ==
- Cogan, Brian. Encyclopedia of Punk Music and Culture. Westport, Conn.: Greenwood Press, 2006. p. 70. ISBN 978-0-313-33340-8.
- Mount, Heather. "Three Looks into The Ex". In Crane, Larry. Tape Op: The Book about Creative Music Recording, Volume 2. Milwaukee: Hal Leonard Corporation, 2010. pp. 230–233.
- Robbins, Ira A., ed. The Trouser Press Guide to '90s Rock: The all-new 5th edition of The Trouser Press Record Guide. New York: Simon & Schuster, 1997. ISBN 0684814374.
- Sok, G.W. A Mix of Bricks & Valentines: Lyrics 1979–2009. New York: PM Press, 2011.
- Temporary Services. Group Work. New York: Printed Matter, March 2007.
