= Humo (magazine) =

Dutch-language Belgian magazine

HUMO
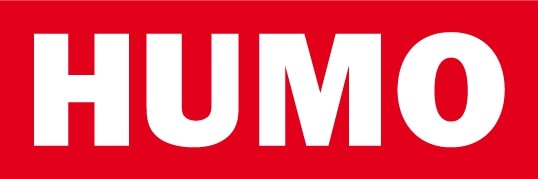

- Cover of Humo (November 2018)
- Categories: TV magazine, Satirical magazine, Music magazine
- Frequency: Weekly
- Circulation: 150,232 (2013)
- Founded: 1936; 90 years ago
- Company: DPG Media
- Country: Belgium
- Language: Dutch
- Website: Humo

Humo (stylized in all caps) is a popular Dutch-language Belgian weekly radio and television magazine.

== History and profile ==
Humoradio (meaning a portmanteau of 'humor' and 'radio' in English) was first published in 1936 as a Dutch-language counterpart to Le Moustique, now Télémoustique. During World War II between 1940 and 1944, Humoradio was not published. In 1958, when television started to reach a larger audience in the country, the magazine was renamed as Humo. The magazine is published on a weekly basis.

Humo as it is recognized today started emerging from 1969 on, when Guy Mortier became its chief editor. He gave the magazine its playful comedic tone, put more emphasis on articles about rock music and shaped it into a magazine that appealed to a left-wing, progressive audience. During Mortier's term many classic columns, interview series, annual cultural events and comic strips that are still considered to be part of "Humo" today saw the light of day. Among those is the annual Humo's Pop Poll, organized since 1967, which lets readers elect their favorite people, radio shows, TV shows, music groups,... of the year. Another recurring event is Humo's Rock Rally, an important Belgian contest for young rock bands. Humo also sponsors the Rock Werchter festival since its conception in 1977. In 2003, Mortier retired.

Humo's home cartoonist is Kamagurka, whose style influenced the overall cult appeal of the magazine. The magazine's mascots, Bert and Cowboy Henk, are creations by him, both featured in weekly comics series.

The owner of Humo was Sanoma and was published by Sanoma magazines. In May 2015 the magazine was acquired by De Persgroep.

== Circulation ==
Since 2002, Humo has had a declining circulation rate. During the period of 2006–2007, the circulation of the magazine was 278,000 copies. The magazine sold 320,000 copies on 23 September 2008 when it offered a free copy of Goddamned Days on a Goddamned Planet, an unpublished new novel of Flemish author Dimitri Verhulst. During the first quarter of 2009, the circulation of the magazine was 256,558 copies. The magazine had a circulation of 215,409 copies in 2010 and 197,105 copies in 2011. It was 166,732 copies in 2012. The 2013 circulation of the magazine was 150,232 copies.

== Past and present contributors to Humo ==
=== Journalists ===
- Herman De Coninck
- Yves Desmet
- Marc Didden
- Guy Mortier
- Herman Selleslags
- Serge Simonart
- Rudy Vandendaele

=== Columnists ===
- Herman Brusselmans
- Willy Courteaux
- Patrick De Witte
- Arnon Grunberg (until August 2024)
- Gerrit Komrij
- Tom Lanoye
- Hugo Matthysen
- Jan Mulder
- Kees van Kooten
- Guido Van Meir
- Rudy Vandendaele

=== Cartoonists ===
- Jonas Geirnaert
- Gummbah
- Jeroom
- Kamagurka (Bert, Cowboy Henk)
- Ever Meulen
- Herr Seele (Cowboy Henk)
- Peter van Straaten
