= Marion Coutts =

British artist and musician (born 1965)

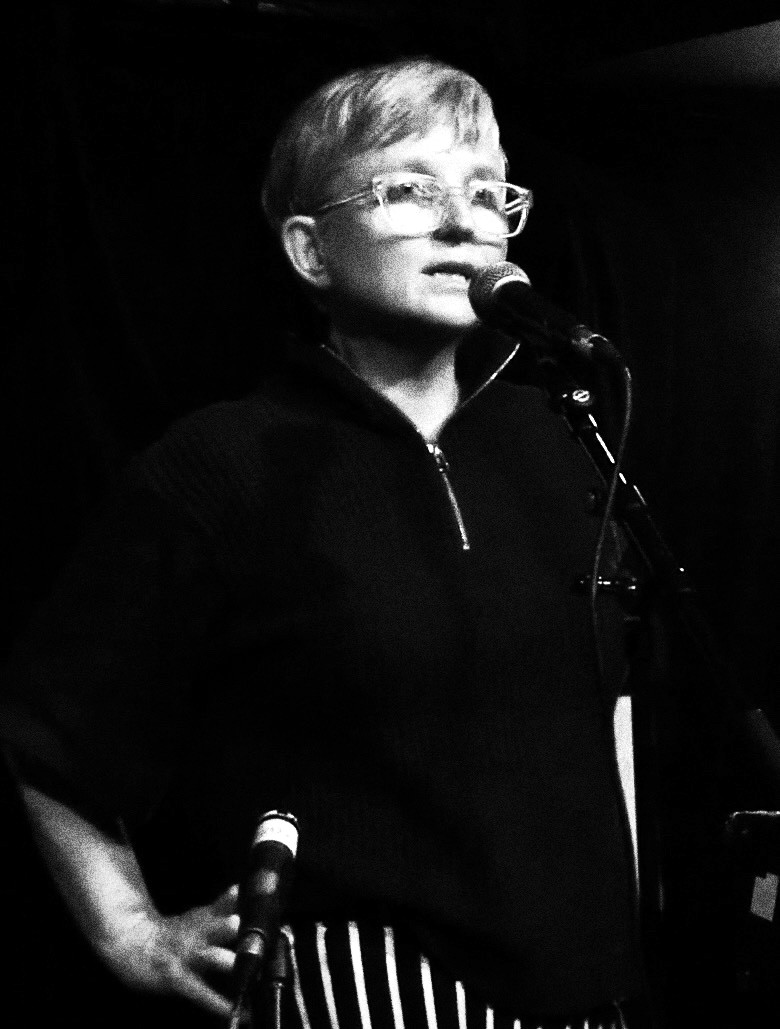
- Coutts in 2023
- Born: 1965 (age 60–61); Nigeria, West Africa
- Known for: Film; video; sculpture; installation; books
- Notable work: The Iceberg: A Memoir
- Spouse: Tom Lubbock
- Musical career
- Genres: Post-punk; art punk; anarcho-punk; experimental rock
- Instruments: Vocals; trumpet; percussion
- Years active: 1986–1995
- Labels: Demon Radge; Konkurrel; Alternative Tentacles
- Website: marioncoutts.com

Marion Coutts (born 1965) is a British sculptor, photographer, filmmaker, author, and musician, known for her work as an installation artist and her decade-long tenure as frontwoman for the post-punk band Dog Faced Hermans. In 2014, she published her critically acclaimed memoir, The Iceberg.

== Early life ==
Marion Coutts was born in Nigeria and raised in the United Kingdom. Her parents were Salvation Army ministers with whom she traveled extensively. The church they attended had a strong musical tradition that encouraged young girls to play brass instruments, and at age 10, Coutts started playing trumpet for a large Salvation Army band.

Coutts' family lived in London and then Scotland where she stayed to attend college, earning her BA degree in Fine Art at Edinburgh College of Art from 1982 to 1986.

== Music ==
While attending college, Coutts joined an improvisational musical project called Volunteer Slavery. Named after an album by Rahsaan Roland Kirk, the group consisted of three men and three women who "mostly banged on things," including guitars, oil drums, and other percussion. Coutts played trumpet and another woman played sax, and their first gig was a benefit in support of the UK miners' strike. The group persisted for a year-and-a-half without writing any formal songs, though a demo tape was recorded and has since resurfaced on the internet.

=== Dog Faced Hermans ===
In 1986, three members of Volunteer Slavery wanted to continue on as a more serious band, and Coutts expressed interest in being their vocalist. They named themselves Dog Faced Hermans, after an obscure reference in a Frankenstein film, and began paring down their music into shorter, faster songs that still maintained some of Volunteer Slavery's experimental elements. In addition to writing and singing lyrics, Coutts played cowbell and added her trumpet, giving the group a distinctive sound.

The Dog Faced Hermans toured the UK and released a few records until moving to Amsterdam in 1989. During this period, Coutts spent a year in Poland on a British Council Scholarship to attend the State School for the Arts in Wrocław. In 1990, she rejoined her band in the Netherlands, and the group went on to release four more albums. They toured Europe and North America before disbanding in 1995 with various members scattering into new projects around the globe. Coutts returned to the UK to concentrate on her art afterwards.

=== Other appearances ===
Coutts has also recorded on releases with Dutch musical groups The Ex, Instant Composers Pool, and Dull Schicksal; with British groups Spaceheads and the Honkies; with American group God Is My Co-Pilot on their 1994 Peel Session, and with cellist Tom Cora. After a musical hiatus, she recorded on a couple of compilation tracks, but no musical output has been heard from her since 1998.

== Visual art ==
Coutts is known for her non-linear film and video style, often juxtaposed with sculpture to create immersive installations, sometimes with elements that invite viewers to participate in the work. For 1999's Fresh Air, she built a set of three irregularly shaped ping-pong tables, which replicated maps of London's Battersea, Regent's, and Hyde Park, each bisected by a table tennis net. That same year, Eclipse took a small garden greenhouse which was periodically filled with artificial fog, fittingly at London's Gasworks Gallery. 2000's Assembly superimposed film of flocking starlings onto a wooden lectern. In 2001's Decalogue, Coutts emblazoned a set of tenpins with each of the Ten Commandments.

2002's Cult beckoned onlookers to squeeze between a configuration of rectangular columns and peer into the eyes of a black cat looped in semi-stillness on nine video monitors. Artforum stated, "Cult evokes prehistoric standing stone circles as well as hieratic Egyptian cat sculpture-in ancient Egypt, the cat goddess Bastet was the patroness of family happiness." First installed at London's Chisenhale Gallery, the gallery describes the work:

The viewer first experiences the group from a distance, the monitor screens providing the only source of light. Moving onto the platform and amongst the screens, visitors are made aware that each cat is moving, but barely perceptibly. From any position, only two or three of the cats' faces are visible. Each cat goes through a cycle of opening and closing their eyes, of waking and sleeping and each cycle remains dogmatically out of sync with its neighbours.

Coutts has enlisted Ex-Dog Faced Hermans guitarist Andy Moor to score many of her short films. Shot on super-8, her 2000 film Epic follows the adventures of a life-sized model horse as it's ceremonially carried through the city of Rome. 2002's No Evil Star, named for the second half of a well-known palindrome, shows closeups of live mealworms colonizing a clay city. Moor also scored Twenty Six Things, a film that Coutts comprised from artifacts collected by Henry Wellcome that she herself was never permitted to touch.

== Personal life and teaching ==
In 1996, Coutts completed the London Arts Board/Institute of Education "Artists in Schools" Training Programme and received a City and Guilds Further and Adult Education Teacher's Certificate in 1997. From 1996 to 1999, she worked as a fine arts tutor and taught courses in portfolio preparation, after which she lived in Rome on a scholarship. In 2001, she undertook a MOMART Fellowship at Tate Liverpool, followed by a Kettle's Yard Fellowship at St John's College, Cambridge in 2003.

In 1997, Coutts began a relationship with fellow artist Tom Lubbock who wrote for the arts section for the British newspaper The Independent. The two married in 2001 and lived in separate flats in the north and south of London. When their son Eugene was born in 2007, they settled in Brixton.

In 2001, Coutts began tutoring and guest teaching at Goldsmiths University, taking up a permanent position there in 2007. Concurrently, she was a visiting tutor for the Sculpture, City and Guilds of London Art School in 2002 and 2003, a visiting lecturer and then research fellow at the Norwich School of Art and Design on and off from 2004 to 2009, and an associate lecturer at University of the Arts, London from 2005 to 2010.

In 2008, her husband was diagnosed with a brain tumor that turned out to be glioblastoma multiforme. Told that he would have about two years to live, they moved into a hospice in 2010. He died of the cancer in 2011.

== Writing ==
Before Lubbock's illness, Coutts regarded herself purely as a visual artist and not a writer. Feeling unable to create anything while her husband underwent treatment, she turned to writing. In 2009, after Lubbock's first brain surgery and rounds of chemotherapy, Coutts began to jot things down in a series of Word docs. Initially these fragments, or "little lenses" as Coutts calls them, were a reflexive practice, which she eventually joined into a chains of texts and realized as a larger work.

In 2012, Coutts contributed the introduction to her husband's posthumously released memoir, Until Further Notice, I Am Alive. That same year, she edited Lubbock's essay collection, The English Graphic.

In 2014, Coutts published her book The Iceberg, a "poetic and searing memoir" about her husband's death. The memoir begins at the point of Lubbock's 2008 diagnosis and follows him, Coutts, and their son Eugene (called "Ev" in the book) up through his treatment and eventual death in 2011. The Los Angeles Times praised the book, saying, "'The plot of The Iceberg can be summed up in a sentence: A man gets sick and dies. Indeed, little else happens in artist turned author Marion Coutts' account of the final two years of her husband's life. Yet it is dazzling, devastating." The Iceberg was shortlisted for several literary prizes, and Coutts was awarded the Wellcome Book Prize in 2015.

== Works ==
=== Discography ===
Albums with Dog Faced Hermans:

- Humans Fly (1988, Calculus)
- Everyday Timebomb (1989, Vinyl Drip)
- Mental Blocks For All Ages (1991, Konkurrel/Project A Bomb)
- Hum of Life (1993, Konkurrel/Project A Bomb)
- Bump and Swing (1994, Konkurrel/Alternative Tentacles)
- Those Deep Buds (1994, Konkurrel/Alternative Tentacles)

=== Sculpture and installation ===
- Fresh Air (1998)
- Souvenir (2000)
- Decalogue (2001)
- For The Fallen (2001)
- Prophet (2001)
- Sibyl (2001)
- Cult (2002)
- Everglade (video, 2003)
- Money (2003)
- Tenner (2003)
- abcdefg (2007)
- Reading Column (2008)
- Twenty-Six Things (16mm film, 2008)

=== Film and video ===
- Epic (2000)
- No Evil Star (2002)
- Mountain (2005)

=== Books ===
- Marion Coutts (FVU, 2003)
- Until Further Notice, I Am Alive (introduction, Granta, 2012)
- The Iceberg (Atlantic, 2014)
- What Did the Deep Sea Say? (Fern Press, 2026)

== Exhibitions ==
- Yorkshire Sculpture Park (2000)
- Troubleshooting at Arnolfini in Bristol (2001)
- Museo de Arte Carrillo Gil in Mexico City (2002)
- Firstsite in Colchester (2002)
- Northern Gallery of Contemporary Art in Sunderland (2002)
- Cult at Chisenhale Gallery in London (2002)
- To Be Continued... at Kunsthalle Helsinki (2005)
- Tablet in London (2005)
- Responding to Rome at The Estorick Collection, The New Art Centre and Chisenhale Gallery.

== Awards ==
- 2015 Wellcome Book Prize
