= Herr Seele =

Flemish cartoonist, author, actor, piano tuner and piano collector

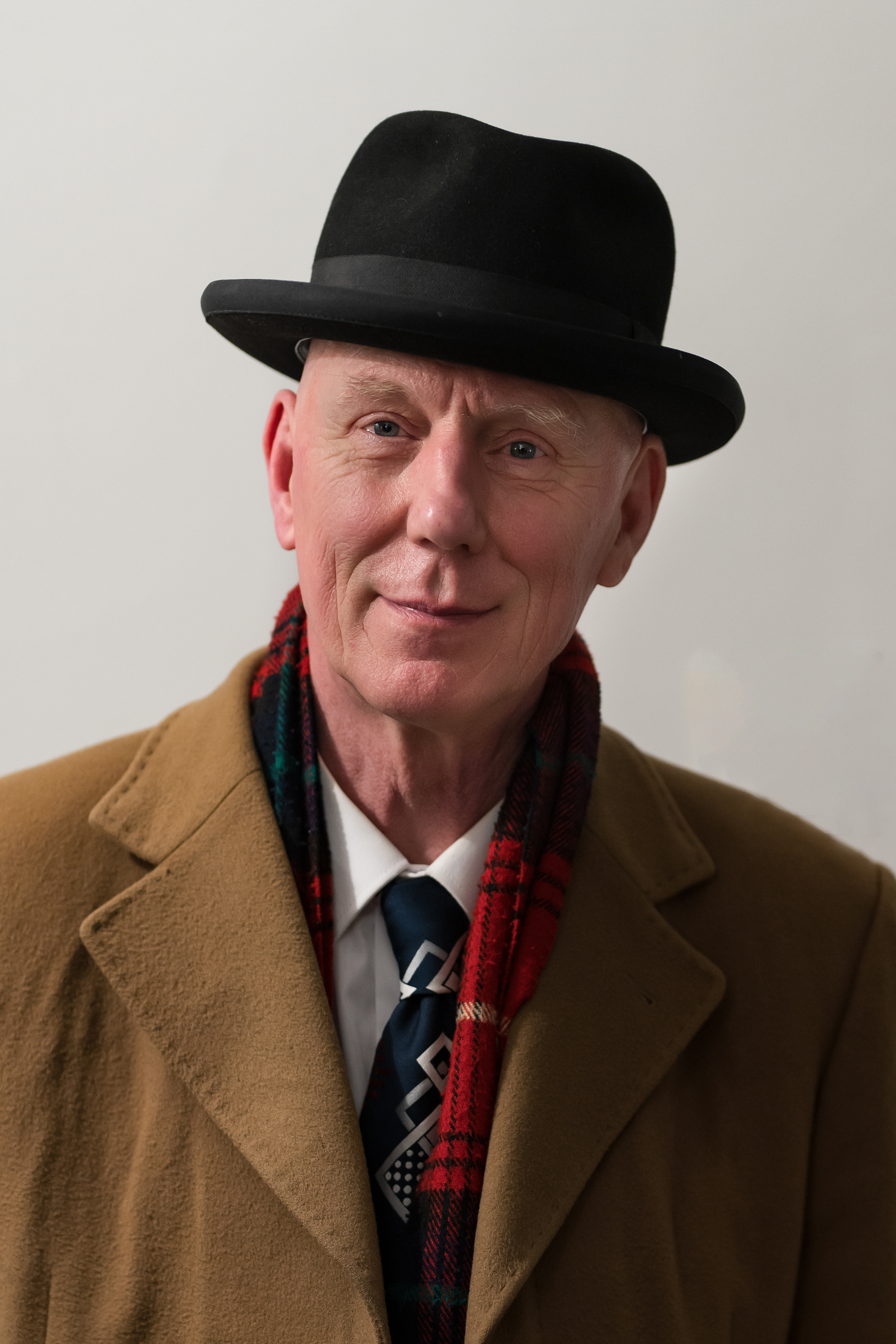
- Herr Seele in 2023
- Born: 13 April 1959 (age 67); Torhout
- Notable work: Cowboy Henk

Comedy career
- Genres: Absurd humor, Observational comedy, Satire

Signature
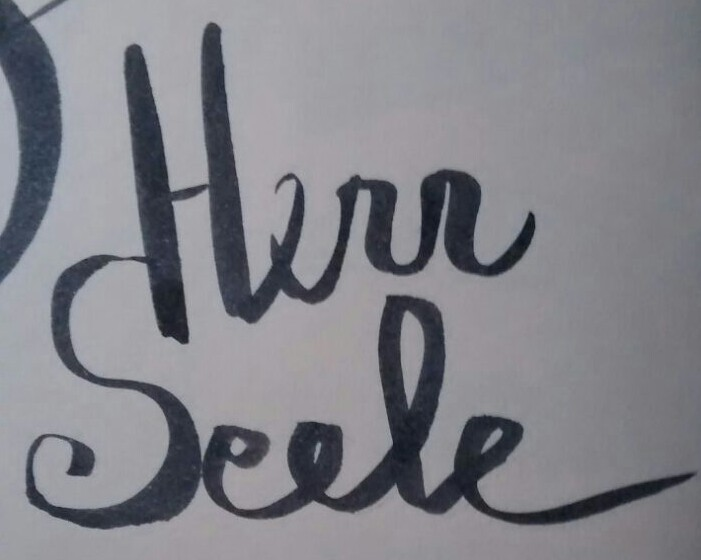

Herr Seele is the pseudonym of Peter Van Heirseele (born 13 April 1959, Torhout, Belgium), a Flemish cartoonist, author, actor and piano collector.

He is mainly known for drawing the absurd humor comic strip Cowboy Henk, for which his colleague Kamagurka writes the scripts. The strip has been published in HUMO since 1981, with only a minor interruption from October 2011 until the spring of 2013. During this period, Seele made another gag-a-day comic series Dikke Billie Walter. Since the spring of 2013, Cowboy Henk appears in the magazine again.

== Biography ==
Van Heirseele was born in Torhout and attended the Sint-Jozefsinstituut. When he was sixteen, he went to the Ghent Academy for the Fine Arts, where he completed his high school years and followed with a year in sculpting, after which he learned to tune and repair pianos at the Ystrad Mynach School in Wales. He then went to Florence, Italy, where he learned how to renovate them.

== Career ==
In 1981, he began drawing Cowboy Henk with Kamagurka, for the first time using the pseudonym Herr Seele. Originally, the comic strip was intended for De Vooruit, but soon it was published exclusively in HUMO. Cowboy Henk was published in several countries, including Brazil (in a comics magazine named Animal), Scandinavia and the United States (RAW).

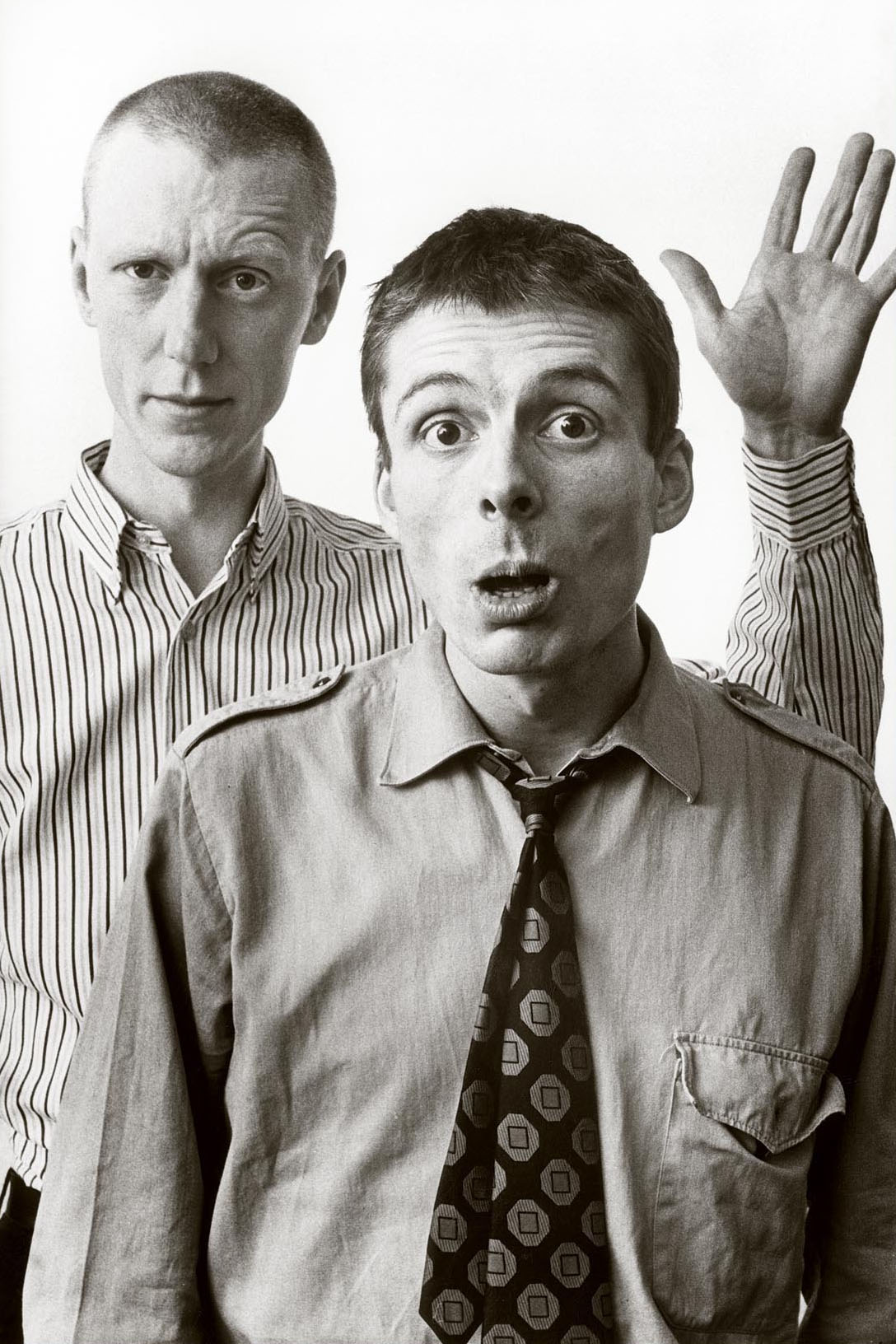
Herr Seele behind Kamagurka in 1982

In 1983, Herr Seele started acting on television, his first show being Sfeervol Bullshitten, which was written by Kamagurka. It was followed in 1985 by a 20-part series, called Kamagurka en Herr Seele, written by the duo for the Dutch VPRO. After these first successes, other shows followed, like Johnnywood, Wees Blij Met Wat Je Hebt, Lava and Bob & George. He has also made the radio show Studio Kafka with Kamagurka.

== Piano Collection ==
Herr Seele owns one of the most renowned collections of early historic pianos in the world, which is stored at Ostend and contains over 200 instruments. He is also a piano tuner himself.

== Album cover design ==
He designed the cover of "Steelt de Schouw!" (1994) for Pater Moeskroen.
