= Dog Faced Hermans =

Scottish post-punk band

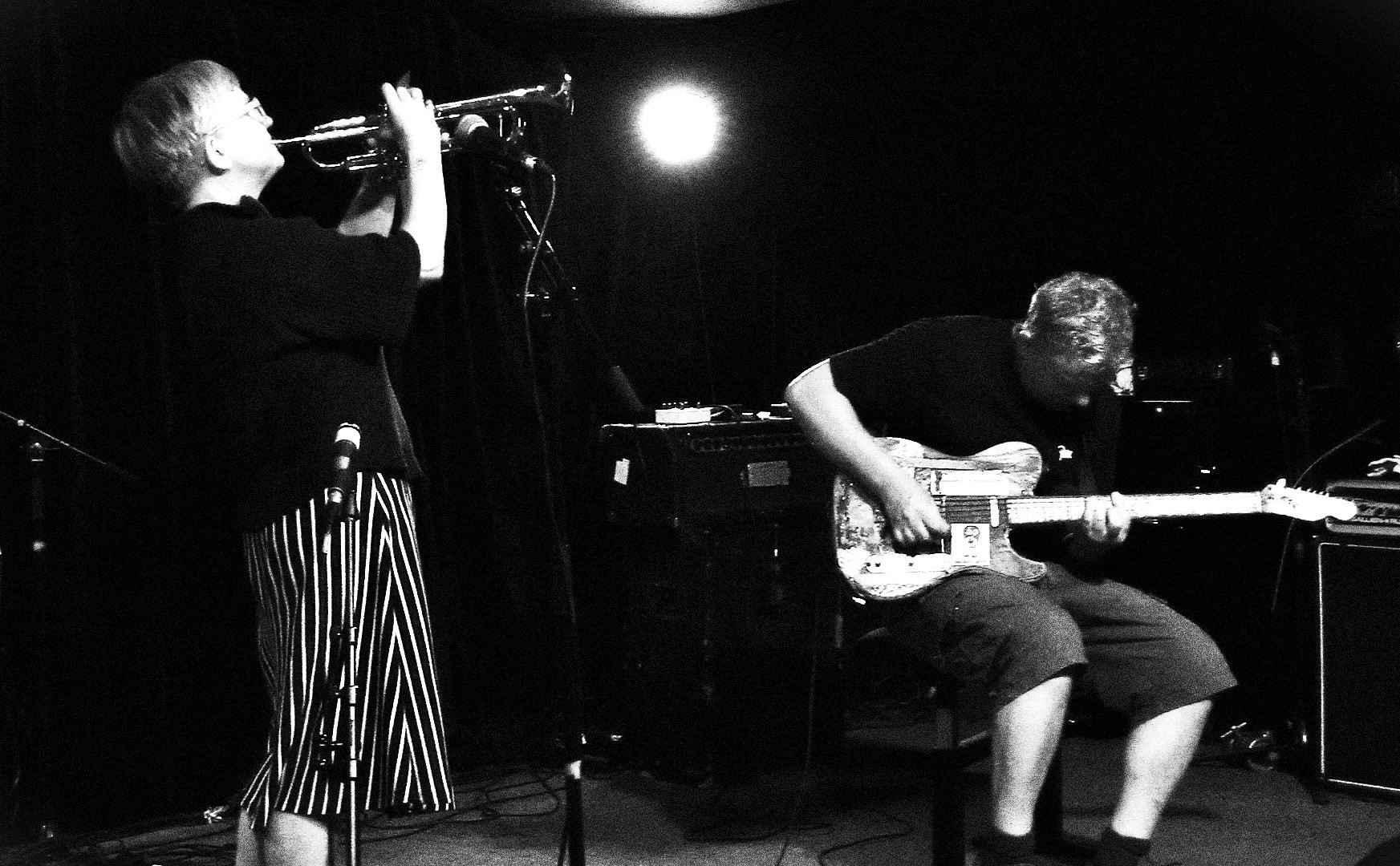
- Marion Coutts and Andy Moor performing live in Montreuil, France, in 2023

Background information
- Origin: Edinburgh, Scotland
- Genres: Post-punk; anarcho-punk; avant-punk; noise rock; experimental rock
- Years active: 1986–1995
- Labels: Demon Radge; Calculus; Vinyl Drip; Konkurrel; Project A Bomb; Alternative Tentacles
- Members: Marion Coutts; Andy Moor; Colin McLean; Wilf Plum; Gert-Jan Blom
- Website: dogfacedhermans.bandcamp.com

Dog Faced Hermans were a Scottish post-punk band from Edinburgh, Scotland, that was active from 1986 to 1995. They emerged from the UK anarcho-punk scene with a typical guitar, bass, and drum lineup, but also incorporated trumpet and other instruments not commonly found in punk music at that time. The band's composition style incorporated many genres of music outside of rock, including folk, jazz, ambient and noise music with often unorthodox instrumentation.

== History ==
=== 1986-1988 ===
Dog Faced Hermans formed in Edinburgh, Scotland, out of the female-fronted punk funk sextet Volunteer Slavery, named after an album by Rahsaan Roland Kirk. Londoner Andy Moor, who was studying anthropology in Edinburgh, first met Colin McLean at a benefit for the Scottish Campaign to Remove the Atomic Menace, and the two shared a love of James Brown, free jazz, reggae, and African music. McLean owned both a guitar and a bass, which he traded off with Moor, eventually deciding on their roles in the band after realizing that the songs they liked best were the ones with McLean on bass and Moor on guitar. Wilf Plum had been moonlighting with local noise bands Finitribe and Stretchheads, and Marion Coutts took time off from her studies at Edinburgh College of Art to play trumpet, and the whole group also took to banging on oil drums and other percussion.

The band claimed that they got their new name from a scene in a Frankenstein movie, stating "where a woman dreams that her husband, whose name is Herman, gets turned into a dog," although the phrase actually occurs in the 1933 horror The Vampire Bat. When the band started, they played primarily improvised music, "like bashing oil drums and hitting the guitars without actually playing very many tunes," according to drummer Wilf Plum. Their longer improvisations were condensed into shorter arranged songs that still maintained their experimental qualities. The Dog Faced Hermans' lineup stayed constant throughout their tenure, with Marion Coutts fronting the band on vocals, trumpet, and percussion, Andy Moor on guitar, Colin McLean on bass, and Wilf Plum on drums. Within their first three years as a band, the Hermans recorded and released a few singles and two full-length albums on their own label, Demon Radge Records, and on journalist Everett True’s label, Calculus. These early records demonstrated the breadth of the band's influences, including English and Scottish post-punk, American no wave, and various styles of folk music, exemplified in their renditions of the Italian partisan song "Bella Ciao" and the blues standard "John Henry".

While in the UK, the Dog Faced Hermans made numerous appearances on the BBC, recording three songs for The John Peel Show in 1987 and appearing twice on the TV programme FSd in 1988.

=== 1989-1995 ===
"Jan 9" (1993)
Twenty-nine second sample of "Jan 9" from the Dog Faced Hermans album Hum Of Life.

The band found affinity in Dutch anarchist group The Ex, whom they'd been introduced to through members of Chumbawamba. The Ex and Dog Faced Hermans toured Europe, the United States, and Canada together and released the single Lied Der Steinklopfer / Stonestampers Song under the name Ex Faced Hermans. They also released a split live cassette and began a longstanding collaboration with the free jazz ensemble Instant Composers Pool. Dog Faced Hermans also served as the backing band for Kurdish musician Brader, with whom The Ex had also collaborated. By 1990, the band had relocated to Amsterdam, taking on The Ex's sound engineer Gert Jan as a member of the group. In 1991, Andy Moor joined The Ex, and for some years played guitar for both bands simultaneously.

The Dog Faced Hermans struck up a deal with Dutch record label Konkurrent for the release of 1991's Mental Blocks for All Ages and 1993's Hum Of Life, which featured covers of songs by free jazz pioneer Ornette Coleman and American no wave group 8 Eyed Spy. A portion of "Jan 9", the lead track on Hum Of Life, is lifted from the Rumanian folk tune "Rumelaj". An American fan of the band, Geoffrey Trelstad from Minneapolis-based indie rock band Jonestown, released Dog Faced Hermans' records simultaneously in North America on his own label, Project A Bomb. Seeking wider distribution, the band approached former Dead Kennedys vocalist Jello Biafra whom released their final two albums on his Alternative Tentacles label before deciding to disband in 1995. Andy Moor later stated about the breakup, "As a four-piece band, we had said what we had to say." Dog Faced Hermans performed their final three concerts in San Francisco in October 1995, having played nearly 450 gigs in their decade long stint as a band.

=== Post-Hermans ===
Following Dog Faced Hermans' disbandment, Wilf Plum went on to drum for the Canadian ensemble Rhythm Activism and the projects Two Pin Din and Orchestre Tout Puissant Marcel Duchamp. Andy Moor continues to perform with The Ex as a permanent member, as well as numerous other projects. Colin McLean also toured with The Ex as the band's live sound engineer and played bass for their collaboration with Ethiopian saxophonist Getatchew Mekuria. Marion Coutts returned to the UK, dedicating herself to creating and teaching visual art and writing books, with a few brief sojourns into playing and recording music. Sound engineer Gert Jan toured with The Ex for many years, as well as with the bands Red Monkey and Zea.

"Love Split With Blood" (1993)
Twenty-nine second sample of "Love Split With Blood" from the Dog Faced Hermans album Hum Of Life.

== Members ==
- Marion Coutts - vocals, trumpet, bells (1986–1995)
- Andy Moor - guitar, viola, "hippo tube" (1986–1995)
- Colin McLean - bass, guitar, steel drum (1986–1995)
- Wilf Plum - drums, scrap metal, foghorn (1986–1995)
- Gert-Jan Blom - live sound (1990–1995)

== Discography ==
=== Studio albums ===
- Humans Fly (1988, Calculus)
- Everyday Timebomb (1989, Demon Radge/Vinyl Drip)
- Mental Blocks For All Ages (1991, Konkurrel/Project A Bomb)
- Hum Of Life (1993, Konkurrel/Project A Bomb)
- Those Deep Buds (1994, Konkurrel/Alternative Tentacles)

=== Compilation albums ===
- Humans Fly / Every Day Timebomb (1991, Konkurrel/Demon Radge)

=== Live albums ===
- Live Action & Increasing (1988, Demon Radge)
- At The Ancienne Chocolaterie (1991, Demon Radge)
- Bump And Swing (1994, Konkurrel/Alternative Tentacles)

=== Singles ===
- "Unbend" (1987, Demon Radge)
- "Miss O'Grady" / "Bella Ciao" (1988, Calculus)
- "Too Much For The Red Ticker" / "Time Bomb" (1989, Konkurrent)
- "Hoax" / "Peace Warriors" (1993, Compulsive) - split with Jonestown & The Honkies
- "New Year" (2022, Demon Radge)

=== With The Ex ===
- Lied Der Steinklopfer / Stonestampers Song (1990, Ex) - released under the name Ex Faced Hermans
- Treat (1990, Convulsion Cassettes)
- Bimhuis 29/06/91: 6.4¹ & 6.4² (1991, Ex) - part of The Ex's 6 series of singles released throughout 1991

=== Compilation appearances ===
- "Balloon Girl" on Fridge Freezer 7” EP with the Turncoats, Sperm Wails & Membranes. (Ridiculous, Sharon! Records - SHAZ 001 - 1987)
- "Shat On By Angels" on Censorship Sucks LP (DDT Records - 1987)
- "How Much Vegetation Have You Got?" and "Miss O'Grady" on Menschen Fliegen LP (Constrictor Records CON! 00007 - 1988)
- "Yellow Girls" on Take 5 Shelter benefit LP (Shelter 4 - 1988)
- "Zig Zag Wanderer" on Fast ’N Bulbous Captain Beefheart covers LP (Imaginary Records ILLUSION 002 - 1988)
- "How Much Vegetation Have You Got?" on Gosh! CD (Constrictor, 1988)
- "John Henry" on Diamonds and Porcupines LP (Beat All The Tambourines TAMBEAT 3 - 1989)
- "Cactus" on A Pox upon the Poll Tax LP (Peasant's Revolt Records, 1989)
- "Canzone Giuseppe Penelli" on Radio Mondain Den Haag De Sessies #1 cassette (Trespassers W Records TW1010 - 1991)
- "Draw the Curtain" on Es Gibt ein Leben vor dem Tod LP (1992)
- "New Year" on The Dignity Of Human Being Is Vulnerable LP/CD (Konkeuurent/AWA, 1993)
- "Wings" and "Body Strategic" on Let's Make the Weiner Kid Sing 2xCD (various labels, 1993)
- "Viva" on King Konk: A Royal Compilation LP/CD (Konjurrel, 1994)
- "Fortune" on Attack of the Tentacles CD (Alternative Tentacles, 1995)
- "Blessed Are The Follies" on Upsalapalooza CD (WFMU, 1995)
- "Blessed Are The Follies" on Mordam Records Sampler #3 CD (Mordam Records, 1995)
- "Calley" on Sperminator CD (AWA, 1996)
- "The Women And Girls Go Dancing" on Up to D.A.T. CD (Mad's Collectif, 1997)
- "Incineration" on Commercially Unfriendsly CD (Gott Discs, 1005)
- "Balloon Girl" on Death to Trad Rock CD (Cherry Red, 2009)
- "Catbrain Walk" on C87 3xCD box set (Cherry Red, 2016)

== See also ==
- The Ex
- Rhythm Activism
- Two Pin Din
