= List of songs about London =

This is a list of songs about London by notable artists. Instrumental pieces are tagged with an uppercase "[I]", or a lowercase "[i]" for quasi-instrumental including non-lyrics voice samples.

Included are:

- Songs titled after London, or a location or feature of the city.
- Songs whose lyrics are set in London.

Excluded are:

- Songs where London (or parts of London) are simply name-checked (e.g. "New York, London, Paris, Munich"; lyrics of "Pop Muzik" by M).

== 0–9 ==
- "7 Teen" by The Regents
- "12 Hours In Brixton" by Lisa Lashes
- "12 Strings on Carnaby Street" by Steve Morse
- "13 Chester Street" by The Pretty Things
- "13 Dead" by Benjamin Zephaniah (about the 1981 New Cross fire)
- "13 Dead (Nothing Said)" by Johnny Osbourne (about the 1981 New Cross fire)
- "15 Minutes of Fame" by Sheep on Drugs
- "18 Whitcomb Street" by Ian Whitcomb (Soho)
- "186 Goldhawk Road" by Morwell Unlimited
- "1617 Broadway" (from Mr. Wonderful)
- "1940 London" by Solitaire
- "1st Transmission" by Earthling
- "2007 FPS A London Conversation" by The Clarke & Ware Experiment
- "22 Acacia Avenue" by Iron Maiden
- "22 Grand Job" by The Rakes
- "24 Minutes from Tulse Hill" by Carter the Unstoppable Sex Machine
- "The 253" by Chris T-T
- "27a Pitfield St" by Bassvictim
- "29 Church Street" by Les Humphries Singers (Croydon)
- "3AM Eternal" by The KLF (original "Pure Trance" version)
- "30 Minutes in London" by Antoine Dufour
- "368" by Jamie T
- "The 4 Marys Go Go Dance All Night at the Groovy Cellar" by Captain Sensible
- "4AM in Leicester Square" by Jaguar
- "4.50 From Paddington" by Ken Howard and Alan Blaikley
- "5.52 From Victorloo (London Transport Suite)" by Melodi Light Orchestra Conducted By Ole Jensen (alias of Robert Farnon)
- "5 6 7 8" by Shut Up and Dance (Hackney, Stoke Newington)
- "59 Lyndhurst Grove" by Pulp (Peckham)
- "6 Horsemen (The Brixtons)" by Sleaford Mods
- "62 Brougham Road (Parts One And Two)" by The Apostles (Hackney)
- "7.10 from Suburbia" by Jackie Trent
- "71–75 New Oxford Street" by Mr. Bloe
- "85 Westbourne Terrace" [I] by Goldie & the Gingerbreads
- "853-5937" by Squeeze

== A ==
- "'A' Bomb in Wardour Street" by The Jam
- "A Child of the Jago" by Kaiser Chiefs (named after the novel)
- "A Cockney Christmas" by Dick Emery
- "A Day in the Life" by The Beatles ("now they know how many holes it takes to fill the Albert Hall" from Sgt. Pepper, 1967)
- "A Day on the Town" by Madness
- "A Foggy Day" by Lyn Collins (The Female Preacher)
- "A Foggy Day in London Town" by George and Ira Gershwin
- "A Happening London Town" by Buck Owens
- "A Holloway Person" by The Cleaners from Venus
- "A Limpet In Marshalsea" by Tim Hodgkinson
- "A London, Allons Donc" by Petula Clark
- "A Maiden Came From London Town" by Dave And Toni Arthur
- "A Mayfair Suite" by Harry Roy
- "A Merry Progress to London" by Ewan MacColl
- "A Moment On Hungerford Bridge" by Robb Johnson
- "A Nightingale Sang in Berkeley Square" by Eric Maschwitz, Manning Sherwin and Jack Strachey
- "A Room in Bloomsbury" by Twiggy and Christopher Gable (from the musical The Boyfriend)
- "A Thick, Thick Fog In London" by Jack Payne (bandleader)
- "A Transport of Delight" by Michael Flanders and Donald Swann, about a London bus
- "Abhainn an t-Sluaigh" by Runrig (The Crowded River)
- "A13" by Jah Wobble
- "A13 Trunk Road to the Sea" by Billy Bragg (Wapping, Barking, Dagenham)
- "A405" by Andy Lewis
- "Abbey Road" by Tori Amos, about the eponymous road.
- "Absolument Hyde Park" by Johnny Hallyday & The Blackburds
- "Absolutely Wrong" by Fred Chester and Tom Clare ("I'm Bertie Bright of Bond Street")
- "Acid Meets Dub in Crystal Palace" by Mad Professor
- "'Ackney Road" by Marie Lloyd, about the eponymous road.
- "Acre Lane" by The Thirst (Brixton)
- "Across the River Thames" by Elton John
- "Acton Town" by Robb Johnson
- "Acton Zulus" by Carbon/Silicon
- "Addington Shuffle" by The Drug Addix
- "Africa" by Madness (Holloway)
- "African Headcharge in the Hackney Empire" by Lee "Scratch" Perry
- "Aftermath" by R.E.M.
- "Ain't Gonna Take It" by Tom Robinson Band (Brixton)
- "Alaska Street" by Red Snapper
- "Albert and the 'Eadsman" by Marriott Edgar
- "Albert Bridge" by The Monochrome Set
- "Albion" by Babyshambles (Deptford, Catford)
- "Alicia Quays" by Jamie T
- "All Change for the Bakerloo Line" by The Pyramids and Mood Reaction
- "All Down Piccadilly" from The Arcadians (musical)
- "All Over Now" by The Cranberries
- "All Quiet on the Western Avenue" by Johnny G
- "All Roads Lead To Bow Bells" by Henry Sullivan and Desmond Carter
- "All roads lead to London" by Jockstrap
- "All the Umbrellas in London" by The Magnetic Fields
- "All The Way Home" by Tom Paxton
- "All the Way to Holloway" by The Priscillas
- "All the Way to Richmond" by Ed Welch
- "All the Girls Love Alice" by Elton John (line "And who could you call your friends down in Soho?")
- "All Saints Road" by Black Stalin
- "All Souls Avenue" by The Cult
- "Alperton Head Charge" by Loop Guru
- "Always New Depths" by Bloc Party ("All the pennies in the Thames..")
- "The Amazing London Town" (from The Rothschilds)
- "American Boy" by Estelle
- "The 'Ampstead Way" (from London Town)
- "Anarchy in Hackney" by Robb Johnson
- "And Don't The Kids Just Love It" by Television Personalities (Carnaby Street)
- "And God Created Brixton" by Carter the Unstoppable Sex Machine
- "An Arcade From The Warm Rain That Falls" by Comet Gain (Finsbury Park)
- "An Empty River" by Billy Jenkins
- "Ange's Song After She Crawled Through London" by Jon Langford & Kathy Acker
- "Angel" by My Life Story (set in and around Angel tube station)
- "The Angel, Highbury" by Alan Moore and Tim Perkins (in The Highbury Working)
- "Angel Square" by Would-be-goods
- "Angels Over Kilburn" by Hope of the States
- "Animals Are Vanishing (Martian Invasion 1853)" by Silvery ("Westbourne, Effra, the Tyburn and Fleet Sewers...")
- "Another Camden Afternoon" by The Stranglers
- "Another Day Another Dollar" by Everything But The Girl
- "Another Lonely Night in Old London Town" by Lloyd Lovindeer
- "Ann Boleyn" by R. P. Weston and Bert Lee ("The bloody Tower")
- "Anna the Auctioneer" by Noël Coward
- "Any Old Iron" by Harry Champion
- "Anybody Seen My Trial?" by Beggar & Co. ("... from a board in London Town.")
- "Apples" by Ian Dury
- "'Appy in 'Ampstead" by Albert Ketelbey
- "April In Kings Cross" by The Tyrrel Corporation
- "April Shower at Kew – an Impression" by Haydn Wood
- "Arabs In 'Arrods" by Art Attacks
- "Archer Street Drag" by George Chisholm (after Archer Street, Soho)
- "Archway People" by Saint Etienne
- "Archway Towers" by New Model Army
- "Argyle Square" by Orphans & Vandals
- "Arlington Road" by Gallon Drunk
- "Arrows of Eros" by Golden Silvers
- "The Arsenal" by Blak Twang
- "The Artillery Man and the Fighting Machine" from Jeff Wayne's Musical Version of The War of the Worlds
- "Artillery Row" by The Bevis Frond
- "As Dawn Breaks Over London" by Jah Wobble
- "As Real As Disneyland" by Julian Dawson
- "As The Sun Sets Over London" by Jools Holland
- "Asbestos Lead Asbestos" by World Domination Enterprises (White City)
- "Assignment London" by London Studio Group (featuring Basil Kirchin)
- "Asthma Attack" by CocknBullKid
- "At Bertram's Hotel" by Ken Howard and Alan Blaikley
- "At Ronnie's" by Kenny Clarke/Francy Boland Big Band (title references Ronnie Scott's Jazz Club in London)
- "At the Chime of a City Clock" by Nick Drake ("Ride the range of a London street..")
- "At the House of the Clerkenwell Kid" by The Real Tuesday Weld
- "At the Palais de Dance" by Albert Ketelbey (from A Cockney Suite)
- "At The Scene" by Dave Clark Five
- "At The Tree I Shall Suffer" by John Gay (from The Beggar's Opera – the "tree" is the Tyburn Tree gallows)
- "Autobiography Of A Crackhead" by Shut Up And Dance (the Green Man pub was in East London)
- "Autumn in London" by Tony Osborne
- "Autumn in London Town" by Norrie Paramor and his Orchestra
- "Autumngirlsoup" by Kirsty MacColl ("flying over London../crying over London..")

== B ==
- "Back in the Old Country" by Tom Robinson (Earls Court)
- "Back to Brixton" by Hijack
- "Back To London Town" by Milton Ager, Augustus Barratt, Helen Trix and John Murray Anderson
- "Back To Mystery City" by Hanoi Rocks ("Mystery City" was a London club)
- "BAD" by Big Audio Dynamite
- "Bad Day in Bow Creek" by Fad Gadget
- "The Bad Photographer" by Saint Etienne (Ladbroke Grove)
- "Bad Servant" by Gallon Drunk
- "Bad Young Brother" by Derek B
- "Bag of Dust" by The Cleaners from Venus (Liverpool Street)
- "Bakerloo" by King of Woolworths
- "Baker Street" by Gerry Rafferty
- "Baker Street Muse" by Jethro Tull
- "Baker Street Mystery" by Kai Winding
- "Bakerloo Blues" by Geraldo
- "Bakerloo Non-Stop" by Kenny Baker
- "Bakerloo Symphony" by Mauro Picotto
- "Baker's Treat" by Elton Dean
- "The Ball at Whitehall" from Nell Gwynne (operetta)
- "Ballad of Bethnal Green" by Paddy Roberts
- "Ballad of Brick Lane" by Serafina Steer
- "The Ballad of Climie Fisher" by Half Man Half Biscuit
- "Ballad of London" by Alasdair Clayre
- "The Ballad of Sweeney Todd" by Stephen Sondheim
- "The Ballad of the Warrington" by The Yobs ("The Warrington" is a pub in Maida Vale)
- "Ballad of the Woggler's Mooly" by Kenneth Williams ("But the Bow Street Runners caught him, and the judge said 'He will swing'")
- "Bands From London Are Shit" by MJ Hibbett
- "The Bandstand, Hyde Park" by Haydn Wood
- "Banned From The Roxy" by Crass
- "Bank Holiday ('Appy 'Ampstead)" by Albert Ketèlbey
- "Bar Italia" by Pulp
- "Barking Park Lake" by Riff Raff
- "Barmy London Army" by Charley Harper
- "Barnes Bridge" by Harold McNair
- "Bartholomew Fair" by Vivian Ellis
- "Basement Kiss" by Elvis Costello (North End Road; Belgravia)
- "Basing Street" by Nick Lowe
- "Basing Street Leslie" by Arrows
- "Bat Out of Surbiton" by Wat Tyler
- "Bathing In The Serpentine" (from The Bing Girls Are There – a follow-up to The Bing Boys Are Here)
- "Bathtime in Clerkenwell" by The Real Tuesday Weld
- "Battersea" by Jimi Jamison
- "Battersea Bardot" by Pearlfishers
- "Battersea Bardot" by Cock Sparrer
- "Battersea Bedsitter Blues" by Peter Lundblad
- "Battersea Boys" by Chris Difford
- "Battersea Bridge Baptism" by Chris T-T
- "Battersea Moon" by Eddi Reader
- "Battersea Odyssey" by Super Furry Animals
- "Battersea Power Station" by Junior's Eyes
- "Battersea Rain Dance" by Chris Barber and his Jazzband
- "Battersea Rise" by Andy Mackay
- "The Battle of All Saints Road" by Big Audio Dynamite (a street in Ladbroke Grove)
- "The Battle of Epping Forest" by Genesis
- "Battlefield W1" by The Adicts
- "The Bay of Battersea" by George Grossmith
- "BD7" by New Model Army ("West End")
- "Beat Dis" by Bomb the Bass (some mixes)
- "Beatles Zebra Crossing?" by Shriekback
- "Beautiful Bermondsey" by Dick Emery
- "Beckton Dumps" by Humble Pie (Eat It album)
- "Bedsit City" by The Parkinsons
- "Beefeaters" by Johnny Dankworth
- "Belmont Street" by The Del-Tones
- "Behind Closed Doors of the House of Commons" by Dennis Bovell
- "Being for the Benefit of Mr. Kite!" by The Beatles (Bishopsgate) from Sgt. Pepper's Lonely Hearts Club Band, 1967
- "Belgravia" by Ikara Colt
- "Belgravia" by Manfred Mann
- "The Belle of Barking Creek" by Paddy Roberts
- "Belle Of Chalk Farm" (from Hello Cheeky)
- "Bells Of Brixton" by Friends, Lovers & Family
- "Belmarsh" by The Business
- "Belsize Blues" by Al Stewart
- "Bench Number 3, Waterloo Station" by Claude François
- "Berkeley Mews" by The Kinks
- "Berkeley Square and Kew" (from the musical Primrose)
- "Burlington Bertie (Tramp)" by Herbie Flowers
- "Bermondsey" by Nadia Cattouse
- "Bermondsey" by Sid James (in Three Hats for Lisa)
- "Bermondsey Bosom (Right)" by King Krule
- "Bertha from Balham" by Noël Coward
- "Berwick Street Bounce" by Diz Disley & The Soho String Quintette
- "Best Days" by Blur
- "Bethnal Green Tube Disaster" by Fad Gadget
- "Better Not Look Down" by B.B. King
- "Between the Dilly And Blue Gate Fields (City) by Jools Holland
- "Beyond The Legend of the Battersea Asparagus Triangle" by The Orb
- "Biba's Basement" by Thrashing Doves
- "Les Bicyclettes de Belsize" by Engelbert Humperdinck
- "Big Beat In London" by T La Rock
- "Big Ben" by Area-7
- "Big Ben" by Bill Shepherd (arranger for the Bee Gees)
- "Big Ben" by Denny Laine
- "Big Ben" by Frank Weir
- "Big Ben" by Roddy Frame
- "Big Ben Blues" by David Owen Norris
- "Big Ben Blues" by Ray Martin
- "Big Ben Boogie" by Winifred Atwell
- "Big Ben Dub" by Mad Professor & Scientist
- "Big Ben Gone Wrong" by Mad Professor
- "Big Black Smoke" by The Kinks
- "Big Jump at Picket's Lock" by Eddie Kidd
- "Big Punk" by Judge Dread
- "Billy Bentley" by Kilburn and the High Roads (Archway, Kilburn, Dalston, Clapham, Ealing, Covent Garden, etc.)
- "Bingo" by Madness
- "Birdcage Walk" by Arnold Steck
- "Birdcage Walk" by Martha and the Muffins
- "Birdcage Walk (Doing The)" by Jools Holland
- "Birdman of EC1" by Saint Etienne
- "Birds" by Kate Nash
- "Bish Bash Bosh" by The Cleaners from Venus (Liverpool Street)
- "The Bishop Went Down To Fulham" by Paul Brett
- "Bishops Gate" by Towers of London
- "Bitter Fingers" by Elton John (about the Denmark Street music publishing trade)
- "Black Angel" by Tom Robinson Band (Brixton, Clapham)
- "Black Boy Lane" by Babyshambles
- "Black Camels of Lavender Hill" by Kim Fowley (a street in Clapham)
- "The Black Dog" by Taylor Swift
- "The Black Grunger of Hounslow" by Kenneth Williams
- "Black London Blues" by Ram John Holder
- "The Black Rats of London" by Bruce Hornsby
- "Blackboard Jumble" by Barron Knights (Chiswick)
- "Blackditch" by Oicho (David Harrow)
- "Blackfriars Bridge" by The Men They Couldn't Hang
- "Blackheath Episode" by Storm Bugs
- "Blackwall Reach" by Saint Etienne
- "Blane Over Camden" by Egg
- "Blessbury Road" by The Fourmyula
- "Blessed" by Simon & Garfunkel
- "Blind Eye" by Hunters & Collectors
- "Blitz Babies" by Bernie Taupin
- "The Blitz in London" by Erich Wolfgang Korngold
- "Bloomsbury Blue" by Simon Nicol
- "Blue Angel" by Gene Pitney
- "Blue Day" by Suggs and Chelsea FC
- "Blue For Waterloo" by Humphrey Lyttelton and his Band
- "Bluegate Fields" by Marc Almond (Bluegate Fields, Shadwell)
- "Blue Is The Colour" by The Chelsea Football Squad 1972
- "Blue Jeans" by Blur (Portobello Road)
- "Blue Monday" by New Order (Re-ordered mix by Paul Dakeyne)
- "Blue Piccadilly" by The Feeling
- "Blue Room in Archway" by The Boo Radleys
- "Bo Street Runner" by The Bo Street Runners
- "Boda en Londres" by Mecano
- "Boileau Road" by Spontaneous Music Ensemble
- "Bollywood to Battersea" by Babyshambles
- "Bombing of London" by The Last
- "Bond Street" by Burt Bacharach
- "Bond Street" by Fats Waller (from The London Suite)
- "Bond Street Catalogues" by Andy Bell (singer)
- "Bond Street Doodle" by Roberto Delgado (alternative name for Horst Wende)
- "The Bond Street Dress Parade" by Clifford Grey (from The Bing Girls Are There – a follow-up to The Bing Boys Are Here)
- "Bond Street Parade" by John Schroeder
- "Bond Street PM" by Mood Mosaic
- "Born Slippy" by Underworld
- "Born to Be a Dancer" by Kaiser Chiefs
- "Bow Bells" by Donald Peers
- "Bow Bells" by Firebird
- "Bow Bells" by Larry Fotine
- "Bow E3" by Wiley
- "The Boy in the Paisley Shirt" by Television Personalities
- "The Boy Looked at Johnny" by The Libertines
- "Boy Meets Girl So What" by McCarthy
- "Boy Racers RM1" by The Wolfhounds
- "The Boys From Highbury" by Arsenal F.C.
- "Breakfast in Mayfair" by Fairport Convention
- "Brent Cross" by 999
- "Brick Lane" by Jools Holland
- "Brickfield Nights" by The Boys
- "Bridge St. Shuffle" by Frank Tovey
- "Bright Lights" by The Special AKA ("I got down to London and what did I see? A thousand policemen all over the street..")
- "Bright Young People" by Noël Coward ("We casually strive to keep London alive from Chelsea to Bloomsbury Square")
- "Bring Back The Routemaster" by Rukaiya Russell
- "Bring On The Funkateers" by Modern Romance
- "British Museum" by Peter Sarstedt
- "British Museum Waltz" by Sydney Carter & Jeremy Taylor
- "Brixton" by Chip Taylor & Jon Langford
- "Brixton" by The Jokers (written by Lloyd Charmers)
- "Brixton" by Rancid
- "Brixton" by Renegade Soundwave
- "Brixton" by The Straps
- "Brixton" by UK Subs
- "Brixton Baby" by DJ Maxi Jazz
- "Brixton Beat" by The Toasters
- "Brixton Blues" by Ram John Holder
- "Brixton Briefcase" by Chase & Status ft. CeeLo Green
- "Brixton Hop" by Derrick Morgan and The Kurass
- "Brixton Hundreds" by The Orb
- "Brixton Leaves" by Duke Special
- "Brixton Nights" by Crazy Pink Revolvers (featuring Stan Stammers)
- "Brixton Possee" by Mikey Dread & Roots Radics
- "Brixton Prison" by King Tubby & Scientist
- "Brixton Rocket" by The Rudies
- "Brixton Serenade" by Lloyd The Matador
- "Brixton Skank" by Trinity
- "Brixton to Harrow" by The Orb
- "Brixton Town" by The Cool Notes
- "Brixton Town Hall" by Dennis Alcapone
- "Brixton Trial & Crosses" by Rod Taylor ft. Prince Hammer
- "Broadcasting House" by George Posford
- "Broadwater Farm" by Junior Delgado
- "Brockwell Park" by Red House Painters
- "Broken Piano" by Frank Turner
- "Bromley Common" by The End
- "Brompton Oratory" by Nick Cave and the Bad Seeds
- "Brook Green Suite" by Gustav Holst
- "Brooklyn To Brixton" by Freq Nasty
- "Broomhouse Road" by The Dash
- "Brother Toby Is A Movie From London" by I-Roy
- "Buck on Fulham Broadway" by Pezband
- "Buckingham Palace" by A. A. Milne (performed by Harold Fraser-Simson among others)
- "Buckingham Palace" by Bill Shepherd (arranger for the Bee Gees)
- "Buckingham Palace" by Canibus
- "Buckingham Palace" by Dillinger
- "Buckingham Palais" by Bobby Crush
- "The Buddha Of Suburbia" by David Bowie
- "Buk-In-Hamm Palace" by Peter Tosh
- "Bullen Street Blues" by Brunning Sunflower Blues Band (featuring Bob Brunning)
- "Bunny Club" by Polly Scattergood
- "Burberry Blue Eyes" by Razorlight
- "Burghley Road" by Writing on the Wall
- "Burning The Boats" by Madness ("The Government have announced that London Bridge is to be sold...")
- "The Burchells of Battersea Rise" by Noël Coward
- "Burlington Arcade" by Rick Wakeman & Adam Wakeman
- "Burlington Bertie" by Vesta Tilley
- "Berlington Bertie from Bow" by Ella Shields
- "Burn Down the Kings Road" by Warfare
- "Busdriver" by Kitto (about taking the 73 bus from Euston to Stoke Newington)
- "Bus Driver's Prayer" by Ian Dury
- "Bus Number 13" by Louis Philippe
- "Bus Stop In Fulham" by Robb Johnson
- "Business Girls" by Madeleine Dring
- "The Busy Streets of London" by Nicholas Phipps and Geoffrey Wright
- "Buying Up Bond Street" by Bill Shepherd (arranger for the Bee Gees)
- "By A Piccadilly Cab-Stand" from A Princess of Kensington
- "By Piccadilly Station I Sat Down and Wept" by Tracey Thorn
- "By The Sea" by Suede

== C ==
- "C.I.D." by UK Subs
- "Cable St. Blues" by Evans The Death
- "Cafe Royal Waltz" by Ron Goodwin
- "Caledonian Society of London" by Jimmy Shand
- "Calling a Friend" by A Friend in London
- "Camberwell Carrot" by Dub Pistols
- "Camberwell Carrots" by Jehst
- "Camberwell Skies" by Basement Jaxx
- "Camden" by State of Grace
- "Camden Bounce" by Big Jay McNeely
- "Camden Dance Party" by Andy Lewis
- "Camden Road Station" by Andy Roberts
- "The Camden Tandem" by Soft Machine
- "Camden Town" by Matt Finish
- "Camden Town" by Suggs
- "Camden Town Rain" by Mary Lou Lord
- "The Camera Eye" by Rush ("Mist in the streets of Westminster..")
- "Can U Dance (Noise Boys Remix)" By Fast Eddie & Kenny "Jammin" Jason
- "Can You Keep A Secret" by Brother Beyond (Silvertown)
- "A Canadian in Mayfair" by Wally Stott
- "Canary Wharf" by Jools Holland
- "Canary Wharf Drift" by Bassvictim
- "Candy" by Robbie Williams (Brixton)
- "Cane Hill" by Anne Clark
- "Capital Radio" by The Clash
- "Capital Radio Rock" by Sir Coxson Sound
- "Car Trouble" by Adam and the Ants
- "Cardboard Box City" by The Levellers
- "Cardboard City" by B.B. Seaton
- "Cardboard City" by Bob Hall (musician)
- "Cardboard City" by Huw Lloyd-Langton
- "Cardboard City" by Jah Warrior presents Hughie Izachaar
- "Cardboard City" by Mama's Boys
- "Cardboard Town" by The Cleaners from Venus
- "Carnaby Chick" by Don Lusher
- "Carnaby Smooth" by Teenage Filmstars
- "Carnaby Street" by Andy Fisher
- "Carnaby Street" by Bill Shepherd (arranger for the Bee Gees)
- "Carnaby Street" by Booker T. & the M.G.'s
- "Carnaby Street" by Carl Levey (reggae tune featuring The Cimarons)
- "Carnaby Street" by The Jam
- "Carnaby Street" by John Addison
- "Carnaby Street" by Louis Bellson
- "Carnaby Street" by Peggy March
- "Carnaby Street Parade" by Bob Miller and the Millermen
- "Carnival In Brixton" by Hugh Masakela
- "Carry On, London" by Billy Cotton
- "Carry On London" by Edward Woodward
- "Casualty" by Visage (references the Tube)
- "Carrion" by British Sea Power
- "Caxton Hall Swing" by Louis Bellson and his Big Band
- "Cemeteries of London" by Coldplay (from Viva la Vida, 2008)
- "Cenotaph/Letter From Amsterdam" by Chris Rea
- "Centre Court" by Ray Ellington
- "Central London Hatchery" by Orlando Allen
- "Chalice in the Palace" by U-Roy
- "Chalk Farm Special" by Niney & Ken Elliott
- "Chalk Farm to Camberwell Green" by Lionel Monckton
- "The Challenge – SW 19" by Harold Faltermeyer
- "Chant No. 1 (I Don't Need This Pressure On)" by Spandau Ballet ("Greek Street. Le Beat Route.")
- "Chaos" by 4 Skins ("..trouble East London..")
- "Chaos Down in Soho" by Sleaford Mods
- "Chapel Market" by Animals That Swim
- "Chapel Street Market 9 am" by The Sabres of Paradise
- "Charing Cross" by Catapilla
- "Charles Windsor" by McCarthy (Trafalgar Square)
- "Charlotte Street" by Lloyd Cole and the Commotions
- "Chase Side Shoot-Up" by Brian Bennett (Chase Side is in Enfield)
- "Checking Out Of London" by John Hackett
- "Cheer Up London" by Slaves
- "Chel-Sea Of Blue" by Ron Harris
- "Chelsea" by Fats Waller (from The London Suite)
- "Chelsea" by Mike & Bernie Winters
- "Chelsea at Midnight" by Acker Bilk
- "Chelsea Beat" by The Flying Dutchmen (featuring Pete Moore (composer))
- "Chelsea Blue Beat" by Laurel Aitken & The Shed Enders
- "Chelsea Boot" by The Shadows
- Chelsea Bridge - Billy Strayhorn
- "Chelsea By Night" by Bill Shepherd (arranger for the Bee Gees)
- "Chelsea China" by Cliff Adams Singers
- "Chelsea Cowgirls" by Duffo
- "Chelsea Dagger" by The Fratellis
- "Chelsea Dawn" by Syd Dale
- "Chelsea Embankment" by Nikki Sudden
- "Chelsea Girl" by Ride
- "Chelsea Girl" by Simple Minds
- "Chelsea Girl (2007)" by The Loves
- "Chelsea Guitar" by Blueboy
- "Chelsea Kids" by Heavy Metal Kids
- "Chelsea Lady" by Harpo
- "Chelsea Love Poem" by Jeremy Taylor
- "Chelsea Lover" by David A. Stewart
- "Chelsea Monday" by Marillion
- "Chelsea Nightclub" by The Members
- "Chelsea Reach" by John Ireland (from Three London Pieces)
- "The Chelsea Reach" by Milton Ager and John Murray Anderson
- "The Chelsea Sky" by Nick Heyward
- "The Chelsea Walk" by Ocean Colour Scene
- "Chelsea Wallpaper" by The Blue Aeroplanes
- "The Children of Waterloo Square" by The Cleaners from Venus (Camberwell)
- "A Child's London – Six Pieces for Piano" by Richard Edward Wilson
- "Chimes of Big Ben" by The Times
- "Chiswick Flyover" by Chick Churchill
- "Chiswick High Road Blues" by If
- "Christmas at Hampton Court" from Rex (musical)
- "Christmas in London" by Julia Fordham
- "Christmas Lights" by Coldplay ("Took my feet to Oxford Street")
- "Christmas Time in London Town" by Nina & Frederik
- "Christopher Robin at Buckingham Palace" by Ann Stephens
- "Circle Line" by Carmel
- "Circle Line Blues" by The Overlanders
- "Circumstances" by Rush
- "Cities" by Talking Heads
- "The City" by Ed Sheeran
- "City of Blinding Lights" by U2
- "City of London" by Douglas Gamley
- "City of London" by The Mekons
- "City on Fire/Final Sequence" by Stephen Sondheim (from the musical Sweeney Todd: The Demon Barber Of Fleet Street)
- "City Of The Dead" by The Clash
- "Clapham Junction" by Alan Haven & Tony Crombie
- "Clapham Junction" by Norma Tanega
- "Clapham Junction" by Toyah
- "Clapham South" by Gonzalez
- "Clark Gable" by The Postal Service
- "Clash City Rockers" by The Clash
- "Clayhill Dub" by Caustic Window ("Clayhill" is in Kingston)
- "Clerkenwell Polka" by Madness (The Liberty of Norton Folgate)
- "Clerkenwell Sound" by Liquid (musician)
- "Climb The Apples" by Bob Wallis
- "Clock Tower Power" by Billy Jenkins (musician) (about Lewisham Clock Tower)
- "Close To You" by Maxi Priest
- "Clown of London" from Kean (musical)
- "Clubland" by Elvis Costello
- "The Co-Communists" by Noël Coward
- "Cockaigne (in London Town)" by Edward Elgar
- "Cockney" by Sonique (musician)
- "The Cockney Amorist" by John Betjeman
- "Cockney and Yardee" by Dominique And Peter Metro
- "Cockney Bill of London Town" by Harry Champion
- "Cockney Black" by Eddy Grant
- "Cockney Capers" by Julian Vincent & Keith Nichols
- "Cockney Cowboy" by Dennis Waterman
- "Cockney Kids are Innocent" by Sham 69
- "The Cockney Lover (Lambeth Walk)" by Albert Ketèlbey
- "Cockney Mystic" by Robert Coyne & Jaki Liebezeit
- "Cockney Rebel" by Ena Baga
- "The Cockney Rhyming Slang Song" by Chas & Dave
- "Cockney Rhythm" by Rebel MC
- "Cockney Sparrers" by Tony Russell (from the musical The Matchgirls)
- "Cockney Sparrow" by Syd Dale
- "Cockney Translation" by Smiley Culture
- "Cockneytouch" by Magnetic (David Harrow)
- "A Cockney's Life For Me" by George Grossmith
- "Cold Kilburn Rain" by Nick Saloman Mary Lou Lord
- "Cold Harbour Lane" by Matthew Fisher
- "Cold Old London" by Rod Stewart
- "Coldharbour Lane" by The Quireboys
- "Coldharbour Lane" by Tom Robinson
- "Columbia" by Oasis (about the Columbia hotel in London) from Definitely Maybe 1994
- "Come Again" by Truman & Wolff featuring Steel Horses
- "Come Back, Be Here" by Taylor Swift
- "Come Back To Camden" by Morrissey
- "Come Back To Croydon" by Brian Auger
- "Come On" by New Power Generation
- "Come on And Get Some" by Cookie Crew
- "Come Round London" (from The Bing Boys Are Here)
- "Coming From London" by Richie Rich (the British producer not the American rappers)
- "Coming To America" by The System ("Hyde Park")
- "Common People" by Pulp
- "Conspiracy" by State of Grace
- "Contact London" by Lab 4
- "Constitution Hill" by Billy Bragg
- "Conversation Off Floral Street" by The Zombies
- "Cooks Ferry Parade" by Freddy Randall
- "Cooksferry Queen" by Richard Thompson
- "Cool For Cats" by Squeeze (Heathrow, Wandsworth (prison), etc.)
- "Cool Runnings Inna W11 Area" by Aswad
- "The Corner Of Wimpole Street" (from Robert and Elizabeth)
- "Corsham Street" by Howard Skempton
- "The Coster Girl in Paris" by Marie Lloyd (Hackney Road etc.)
- "The Coster's Serenade" by Albert Chevalier and John Crook ("Down at the Welsh 'Arp, which is 'Endon way")
- "Cosy Cafe" by Saint Etienne (about a café in Lee Valley, East London)
- "Cotton Comes To Harlesden" by Joseph Cotton, Massive Horns & The A Class Crew
- "The Council Schools Are Good Enough for Me" by Percy Morris and Malcolm Ives
- "Cousins", theme from The Patty Duke Show
- "Covent Garden" by Eric Coates (from London Suite)
- "Covent Garden" by Leslie Bricusse (from Three Hats for Lisa)
- "Covent Garden Starts Early" by Johnny Scott
- "Crane River Woman" by Crane River Jazz Band (featuring Ken Colyer and Monty Sunshine)
- "Cranley Gardens" by Bill Pritchard
- "Cranley Gardens" by I Start Counting
- "Craven Park Dub" by The Revolutionaries
- "Crawling up a Hill" by John Mayall
- "The Cricket Champions (West Indies v. M.C.C. 1954)" by Lord Beginner
- "Cricklewood"/"The Cricklewood Shakedown" by The Goodies
- "Cricklewood" by Johnny McEvoy
- "Cricklewood" by Snuff
- "Cries of London" by Luciano Berio
- "Cripplegate" by Johnny Parker (jazz pianist)
- "Cristal Palace" by Jeane Manson
- "Cromer Aroma" by Phil Daniels + the Cross (about Cromer Street, King's Cross)
- "The Crooked Beat" by The Clash ("..across the river to South London..")
- "Cross the Line" by Pocketbooks
- "Croydon" by Captain Sensible
- "Cross Eyed Mary" by Jethro Tull
- "Crushed Bones" by Why?
- "Crystal Palace" by The Bible
- "Cunt London" by Sleeper
- "Custer Firkinshaw" by Ross MacManus (Fleet Street)
- "Cutty Sark" by Jonah Jones

== D ==
- "Dagenham Dave" by Morrissey
- "Dagenham Dave" by The Stranglers
- "The Dalston Shroud" by Sand
- "Damn Good Show" by Noël Coward ("Everyone in London likes a damn good show")
- "Dancing on Frith Street" by Bill Bruford's Earthworks
- "Dandy on the Circle Line" by The Cleaners from Venus
- "Dans La Prison De Londres" by Louise Forestier
- "Dans Les Rues De Londres" by Mylène Farmer (In The Streets of London)
- "Dark Streets of London" by The Pogues
- "Davy" by Danny Wilson
- "Day by Day" by Generation X (Circle Line)
- "Day on the Town" by Madness
- "Days of Fire" by Nitin Sawhney featuring Natty
- "Dead End Street" by The Kinks (about a bedsit in Kentish Town)
- "The Dead Girls of London" by Frank Zappa
- "Dead London" by Jeff Wayne's Musical Version of The War of the Worlds
- "Dear Old Carnaby Street" by Leslie Crowther
- "Dear Old London Town" A. Baldwin Sloane, John Kendrick Bangs and Roderic C. Penfield
- "Dear Old Shepherds Bush" by Clifford Grey (from the revue The Bing Boys Are Here)
- "Dear River Thames" by Richard Digance
- "Death At The Tower" by John Fox (composer, arranger, conductor)
- "Debris" by The Faces
- "Deceives The Eye" by Madness (West End)
- "Decline and Fall of the Clerkenwell Kid" by The Real Tuesday Weld
- "Dedicated Follower of Fashion" by The Kinks
- "Deep Kick" by Red Hot Chili Peppers
- "Deer Park" by The Fall ("I took a walk down West 11")
- "Delancey Street...The Theme" by Ballistic Brothers
- "Denmark Street" by Cleaners From Venus
- "Denmark Street" by The Kinks
- "Deptford Broadway Boogie" by Jools Holland
- "Deptford Days" by David Knopfler
- "Deptford Market" by Billy Jenkins (musician)
- "Der King Von Soho" by Grethe & Jørgen Ingmann
- "Der Willy Von Piccadilly" by Eve Boswell
- "Destination London" by Betty Roe
- "Dettwork Southeast" by Blak Twang
- "The Devil Went Down to Brixton" by Jim Davidson
- "Diamonds in the Dark" by Mystery Jets (includes the line "We would live on Delancey Street", a road in Camden)
- "Diane From Manchester Square" by Tommy Roe
- "Dick Turpin Suite" by Johnny Pearson
- "Dick-a-Dum-Dum (King's Road)" by Jim Dale
- "Dickens of London" by Ron Goodwin and his Concert Orchestra
- "Did You Go Down Lambeth Way?" by Noel Gay
- "Did You See The Crowd in Piccadilly" by George Formby Snr
- "Difficult Fun" by The Slits
- "The Dilly" by Music Machine With Patti Boulaye
- "Dilly Boys" by The Libertines
- "Ding Walls" by Mark Murphy (singer)
- "Dinner at the Ritz" by City Boy
- "Dirtee Cash" by Dizzee Rascal
- "Dirty Girls" by UK Subs
- "Dirty Water" by The Inmates (originally about the River Charles and Boston, USA, this version is about the Thames and London)
- "Discover London City" by Jah Thomas
- "Disgusted E7" by The Wolfhounds
- "District Line" by MC Tali
- "District Line" by Milburn
- "Districts" by Clifford Grey and A. W. Parry (references Maida Vale, Hammersmith, Battersea, etc.)
- "Docklands Blues" by Ed Ball
- "Docklands Renewed" by British Sea Power
- "Dr Jekyll And Hyde Park" by The Mohawks
- "Do The Right Thing" by Redhead Kingpin and the F.B.I.
- "Do The Strand" by Roxy Music
- "Do You Come Here Often?" by The Tornados ("see you down the 'Dilly")
- "Do You Really Like It?" by DJ Pied Piper and the Masters of Ceremonies
- "(Do You Remember) The Saturday Gigs?" by Mott The Hoople
- "Dogs" by The Who (White City dog-track)
- "Doin' Our Own Dang" by Jungle Brothers and Monie Love
- "Dolphin Square" by David Devant & His Spirit Wife
- "Dolly Birds & Spies" by The Cleaners from Venus
- "Doesn't Rain in London" by Isaac Hayes
- "Don't Bring Lulu" by Dorothy Provine
- "Don't Go Back to Dalston" by Razorlight
- "Don't Go To Soho" by Russ Ballard & The Barnet Dogs
- "Don't Let Dem Fool You" by Blak Twang (Harlesden, East Dulwich)
- "Don't Lose Your Heart In London Town" by Kevin Peek
- "Don't Make Fun of the Festival" by Noël Coward (1951 Festival of Britain on the South Bank)
- "Don't Try To Lay No Boogie on the King of Rock And Roll" by Long John Baldry (Wardour Street)
- "Donald Where's Your Troosers?" by Andy Stewart ("I went down to London Town/And I had some fun in the underground")
- "Dopamine Clouds Over Craven Cottage" by Stars of the Lid
- "Dorchester Hotel" by The Sounds
- "The Double Deckers" by The Double Deckers
- "A Dove Flew Down From The Elephant/The Little Boy in the Castle" by The Style Council
- "Down at Our Battersea Boozer" by Monica Rose
- "Down at the Harbour" by Gallon Drunk
- "Down at the Ritz" by Speed Limit
- "Down at the Vortex" by Yellow Dog
- "Down Below" by Sydney Carter ("It isn't hard to tell, down below, if it's Bow or Clerkenwell, down below")
- "Down in Drury Lane" by Paddy Roberts
- "Down In Soho" by Syd Dale
- "Down in the Tube Station at Midnight" by The Jam
- "Down on London" by The Wildhearts
- "Down on the Underground" by Alan Hull
- "Down Petticoat Lane" by Richard Digance
- "Down Street" by Steve Hackett
- "Down the Apples 'n' Pears" from Sherlock Holmes: The Musical
- "Down the Lane" by Lionel Bart (about Petticoat Lane)
- "Down to London" by Joe Jackson
- "Down Vauxhall Way" by John Hanson
- "Downing Street Dub" by Peter Hunningale
- "Downing Street Kindling" by Larrikin Love
- "Downing Street Rock" by Dennis Bovell
- "Down With the Whole Darn Lot" by Noël Coward ("Down with the Garrick Club and Kensington Museum")
- "Dreadnought Seamen's Hospital" by Billy Jenkins
- "Dream" by Dizzee Rascal
- "The Drinking Song of the Merchant Bankers" by McCarthy
- "Driving in My Car" by Madness
- "The Drummer And the Cook (Cockney Air)" by Harry Belafonte
- "Drums Over London" by Disco Zombies
- "Du" by Cro (singer)
- "Du Cane Road" by Topper Headon
- "Duchess of Duke Street" by Alexander Faris (Duke Street, Marylebone)
- "Dub Conference In London" by The Simeons (reggae)
- "Duffer St. George" by The Fiery Furnaces
- "Duke of Earlsfield" by Sabres of Paradise
- "The Duke of Seven Dials" by George Grossmith
- "Dumb Waiters" by Psychedelic Furs
- "Dungeon Town" by The Brotherhood
- "Dustman in Chiswick" by Spike Milligan with Jeremy Taylor
- "D'Ya Like Scratchin'" by Malcolm McLaren

== E ==
- "E3 Symphony" by Kenny Wellington (of Light of the World (band))
- "Ealing Comedy" by Soft Machine
- "Earl of Kennington" by Portion Control
- "The Earl of Walthamstowe" by The Bevis Frond
- "Earlies" by Trashcan Sinatras
- "Earls Court Blues" by Barry Crocker
- "Earls Court Breakdown" by Alan Tunbridge ft Wizz Jones
- "The Earl's Court Case" by Steve Swindells
- "Earl's Sluice" by Oicho (David Harrow)
- "Earthquake in Westminster" by Ras Tekla & Black Roots (band)
- "East Acton Action" by Alternative TV
- "East End" by Cockney Rejects
- "East End Babylon" by Cockney Rejects
- "East End Ding Dong" by Richard Digance
- "East End Girl" by Cock Sparrer
- "East End Kids" by The Ejected
- "East Sheen" by 'O' Level
- "East Side Struttin'" by Steve Marriott
- "East Stratford Too-Doo" by Mike Westbrook
- "Eastbound Train" by Dire Straits (New Cross Station, Mile End Road, Central line, etc.)
- "'EastEnders' Theme" by Simon May
- "Easy Street, SE17" by Nine Below Zero
- "EC 4" by The Flys
- "Ecstasy (Wherever You May Be)" by Adrenalin M.O.D. (mentions various acid house nights from 1988 nearly all of them in London)
- "E Equals MC2" by Big Audio Dynamite
- "Edgware Station" by Edward Bear
- "Edge of Everything" by Colour Me Wednesday ("The M25 hems us in"; about Uxbridge)
- "Edmonton Green" by Chas & Dave
- "Eel Pie Memories" by Downliners Sect
- "Effra" by Oicho (David Harrow)
- "Eight Miles High" by The Byrds
- "El Morocco Tea Rooms" by Ron Goodwin
- "Electric Avenue" by Eddy Grant
- "Electric Avenue" by Renaissance
- "Elegy (Thoughts on Passing the Cenotaph)" by Albert Ketelbey
- "Elephants And Castles" by George Martin
- "Elgin Avenue" by Tom Robinson Band
- "Elgin Mansions" by Rick Wakeman
- "Elm Grove Window" by The Clientele
- "Elm Park Tramp" by Wat Tyler
- "Elvaston Place" by Al Stewart
- "Emit Remmus" by Red Hot Chili Peppers
- "Encore" by Tongue 'n' Cheek
- "The Engine Driver Song" by Television Personalities (Liverpool Street)
- "England" by Jehst ("Trapped in the Capital..")
- "England" by The National
- "England Belongs To Me" by Cock Sparrer (originally London Belongs..)
- "England 2 Colombia 0" by Kirsty MacColl ("in a pub in Belsize Park")
- "England's Glory" by Max Wall and Ian Dury
- "England Swings" by Roger Miller (mentions Westminster Abbey, and Big Ben) 1965
- "Er Wollte Nach London" by Udo Lindenberg
- "Ernie (The Fastest Milkman in the West)" by Benny Hill (references Teddington)
- "Escape From Kilburn" by Miranda Sex Garden
- "The Eton Rifles" by The Jam (House of Commons)
- "Europa & The Pirate Twins" by Thomas Dolby
- "European Blueboy" by The Mamas & The Papas (Soho)
- "Euston Station" by Barbara Ruskin
- "Euston Station" by The Oyster Band
- "Evening In London" from Follow That Girl
- "Event#5 (Mortlake Mooch)" by Sphincter Ensemble (featuring John Gustafson (musician)
- "Every Little Movement" by Karl Hoschna and Otto Harbach ("Up to the West End, right in the Best End, straight from the country came Miss Maudie Brown")
- "Every Loser in London" by Bill Pritchard
- "Everybody Salsa" by Modern Romance ("Now this ain't Puerto Rico, this is London E18")
- "Everything Eventually" by Appleton ('Let's go fly a kite on Primrose Hill')
- "Everything's Changed (Since You've Been To London)" by Kingmaker
- "The Evil Eye" by Joe Jackson ('I got a job in S.E. 15')
- "Ex-Cable Street" by The Wolfhounds
- "Excuse Me" by Wreckless Eric (Wandsworth, Waterloo, Clapham)
- "Exiting Hyde Park Towers" by Paul Smith (rock vocalist) & Peter Brewis
- "Exodus From Bromley" by Billy Jenkins (musician)
- "Eyeless in Holloway" by Johnny Flynn

== F ==
- "Faces of London" by Magna Carta
- "Fairytales in Feltham" by Robb Johnson
- "Fait Divers De Londres" by Jeane Manson
- "Fake Plastic Trees" by Radiohead
- "A Fallen Star" by Albert Chevalier and Alfred H. West ("Thirty years ago I was a fav'rite at the Vic")
- "Fallin" by Adam and the Ants ("at The Screen on the Green")
- "Family of Noise" by Adam and The Ants ("in Croydon")
- "Fanlight Fanny" by Clinton Ford
- "Fans" by Kings of Leon
- "Father Christmas Down Hounslow High Street by Robb Johnson
- "Father Thames" by Ivor Novello
- "The Fear And Loathing in Tollington Park Rag" by Caravan (Finsbury Park)
- "The Fear of London" by Kelli Ali
- "Feed the Birds" by Sherman Brothers (from Mary Poppins)
- "Feltham Is Singing Out" by Hard-Fi
- "Festival Hall" by Tito Burns
- "Fifty Two Stations" by Robyn Hitchcock (refers to the Northern line)
- "Finchley Central" by New Vaudeville Band
- "Finchley Girl" by The Drivers (featuring Nick Van Eede)
- "Fings Ain't Wot They Used T'Be" by Lionel Bart
- "Finsbury Park, Café 67" by Candy Dulfer
- "Fire/Bombing London" by John Murphy
- "Fire of London" by Grace
- "First Day in London" by Denny Laine
- "First Night Back in London" by The Clash
- "Fish Island" by Jimpster
- "Fitzrovia" by Gravenhurst
- "Five Get Over Excited" by The Housemartins ("I am a guy from Camden Town.")
- "Five Nights of Bleeding" by Poet and the Roots ("right up Railton Road..." [Brixton])
- "Flames of Brixton" by Angelic Upstarts
- "Fleet Street" by Fist
- "Fleet Street" by Rico's Combo
- "Fleet Street Cover Up" by Dennis Bovell
- "Fleet Street Lightning" by Kenny Ball and his Jazzmen
- "Flightpath Estate" by Sabres of Paradise
- "Fly Away" by 5 Seconds of Summer
- "Fog In London" by Lafayette Leake
- "Fog On The Tyne (Revisited)" by Gazza (Paul Gascoigne) & Lindisfarne (band)
- "Fogg's in Yokohama (Reform Club)/San Francisco: Barbary Coast Saloon" (from Around the World in 80 Days)
- "A Foggy Day in London Town" by George and Ira Gershwin
- "Foggy Old London" by Jimmy Martin
- "The Followers" by Fosca ("On a wet day in Whetstone..")
- "Food For Thought" by Barron Knights (The Angel/Smithfield)
- "The Fool on the Hill" by The Beatles
- "For the Girl" by The Fratellis
- "For Tomorrow" by Blur (Westway, Emperor's Gate, Primrose Hill)
- "Forest Gate Rock" by Lester Sterling
- "Forever Autumn" by Justin Hayward
- "Fortis Green" by Dave Davies
- "Forty Fahsend Fevvers on a Frush" by The Billy Cotton Band
- "Four Aces" by King Tubby, about the club.
- "Four Skinny Indie Kids" by Half Man Half Biscuit
- "Fourteen Hour Technicolour Dream" by The Syn (about Alexandra Palace)
- "Fracas at Drury Lane" from Kean (musical)
- "France" by The Libertines
- "Francis Drake Bowls Club" by Billy Jenkins (this club is in Brockley, SE4)
- "Freedom Come Freedom Go" by The Fortunes
- "Freestyle F64" by Lowkey
- "Friday Hill" by Edwards Hand
- "From Chelsea Green to Brighton Beach" by The Times
- "From London to Chicago" by Wild Bob Burgos (from Matchbox (band)) & The Dreadnoughts
- "From London With Love" by Honey Boy
- "From Marble Arch To Leicester Square" by Peter Greenwell
- "From Meadow to Mayfair"[I] by Eric Coates
- "From Newport To London" by Basia
- "From Sivertown" by Jah Wobble
- "From The City to the Isle of Dogs" by Frank Tovey
- "From The South" by Cookie Crew
- "From Wimbledon With Love" by The Wombles
- "Frumpies Forever" by Frumpies
- "Fulham Blues" by The Call
- "Fulham Court" by The Faith Brothers
- "Fulham Stomp" by Fulham F.C.
- "Fun City" by Alternative TV, about Deptford.
- "Fun in Camden" by The Mental
- "Funky Bayswater" by The Squires
- "Funky Frith Street" by Gonzalez
- "Funky London" by Albert King
- "Funky London" by Houston Person
- "Funky London Childhood" by Marc Bolan and T. Rex
- "Funky Nassau" by The Beginning of the End

== G ==
- "Gabrielle" by The Nips
- "Galang" by M.I.A.
- "Gasoline Alley" by Rod Stewart
- "Gates of the West" by The Clash (Camden Town)
- "Gautrey Road Style" by Mad Professor & Jah Shaka
- "The Gay Cavalieros (The Story So Far...)" by Steve Wright
- "Gee Street" by Stereo MCs
- "Generations of Love" by Boy George
- "Gentleman of the Park" by Les Reed (songwriter) & Barry Mason (Belsize Park)
- "Geoffrey Ingram" by Television Personalities
- "Gertcha" by Chas and Dave
- "Get Me to the Church on Time" by Alan Jay Lerner ("London is waking, daylight is breaking")
- "Get Out of London" by Intaferon
- "Get Out of London" by London
- "Get Outta London" by Aztec Camera
- "Ghost in the Strand" by Sting (B-side to Englishman in New York, 1988)
- "The Ghost of Limehouse Cut" by Cathal Coughlan
- "Ghost of Westminster" by TV Smith
- "The Ghosts of Cable Street" by The Men They Couldn't Hang (about the Battle of Cable Street)
- "Ghosts of Ladbroke Grove" by Killing Joke
- "The Ghosts of Oxford Street" by Malcolm McLaren
- "Ghosts of Princes in Towers" by Rich Kids
- "Gilbert Street" by Sweet Thursday
- "Gilbert the Filbert" by Basil Hallam ("...the pride of Piccadilly...")
- "Gina in the Kings Road" by Al Stewart
- "Ginsberg From Scotland Yard" by Belle Baker
- "Girl from London" by Blue Cheer
- "The Girl From London" by Dorothy Reynolds and Julian Slade (from the musical Free As Air)
- "Girl VII" by Saint Etienne (lists numerous London locations)
- "The Girl Who Had Everything" by Television Personalities (The Blitz Club, The Ritz)
- "Give Me A Cockney Song" by Bernie Winters
- "Give Me Back What's Mine" by Gallon Drunk (about the Northern line of the London Underground)
- "Give My Regards to Leicester Square" by Victoria Monks
- "Give Us Back Our Cheap Fares" by Bananarama & Fun Boy Three
- "Glamorous Glue" by Morrissey ("London is dead...")
- "Glasgow Girl" by Rodney Crowell (Camden Town)
- "GLC" by Menace
- "Glory Boys" by Secret Affair
- "Glory Glory Man United" by Manchester United FC ('Wembley' part of the song)
- "Glory Glory Tottenham Hotspur" by Chas & Dave ft Tottenham Hotspur
- "The Glory of Kilburn" by Matthew Strachan
- "Gloucester Road" by Special Needs (or The Needs)
- "Go Ahead London" by The Rapino Brothers Versus Trip Ship
- "Go For It" by Coventry City FC
- "Goblin" by Tyler the Creator
- "God (London)" by Simon Le Bon
- "The Godfrey Brothers" by Comet Gain (West Hampstead)
- "Going Back To London" by Don Partridge
- "Going West" by The Members ('The Westway...The Bush' etc.)
- "Golden Square"[I] by Alan Moore and Tim Perkins (in Angel Passage)
- "Golden Walks of London" by The Bevis Frond
- "Goldhawk Road" by Dustin's Bar Mitzvah
- "Good Groove" by Derek B
- "Good Life" by OneRepublic
- "Good Morning Britain" by Aztec Camera ('where the Thames does flow'/'the underground's just a stop away')
- "Good Old Arsenal" by Arsenal FC
- "Good Old-Fashioned Lover Boy" by Queen (from A Day at the Races, 1977)
- "Goodbye London Town" by Sigmund Romberg
- "Goodbye Nashville, Hello Camden Town" by Chilli Willi and the Red Hot Peppers
- "Goodbye Piccadilly" by The Times
- "Goodbye Post Office Tower Goodbye" by Cressida
- "Goodbye Upton Park" by Cockney Rejects
- "Got To Keep On" by Cookie Crew
- "Govt. Dirty Tricks Dept. WC1" by Captain Sensible
- "GPO Tower" by Dudley Moore Trio
- "Grace" by Florence and the Machine (Camberwell)
- "Graftin'" by Dizzee Rascal ("sky looks grey in London city")
- "Grand Union Canal" by Gallon Drunk
- "Grate Fire of London" by Here & Now
- "The Great Fire of London" by Vice Squad
- "The Great London Traffic Warden Massacre" by Morcheeba
- "The Greater London Radio" by Hefner
- "Greatest Cockney Rip-Off" by Cockney Rejects
- "Greek Street" by Bill Pritchard
- "Greek Street, Soho" by John Scott
- "Green Fields" by The Good, the Bad & the Queen
- "Green Line Bus" by Splinter
- "The Green Man" by Shut Up and Dance (duo) (The Green Man was a pub in Dalston, north London)
- "Green Park" by Anthony Adverse
- "Green Park Blues" by Kate St John
- "Green Park Saturday" by The Bevis Frond
- "Green Park Station" by Earth and Fire
- "Green Street Green" by New Vaudeville Band
- "Greenwich Chorus" by Peter Howell
- "Greenwich Fair" by Ian Campbell Folk Group
- "Greenwich Meantime" by Daddy Longlegs
- "Greenwich Meantime" by Graham Bonnet
- "Greenwich One Way System" by Billy Jenkins
- "Greetings from Shitsville" by The Wildhearts
- "Grief Came Riding" by Nick Cave and the Bad Seeds
- "Grigio Di Londra (Good Old London Town)" by Sergio Franchi
- "Groovin' At The Cue" by Dandy Livingstone ('The Cue' was a West Indian nightclub in late 1960s London)
- "Groveley Road" by Saint Etienne
- "Growing Up in Bromley" by Billy Jenkins
- "The Grunwick Affair" by Dennis Bovell
- "Guildhall Fanfare" by Douglas Gamley
- "The Guns of Brixton" by The Clash
- "Guts of London" by Cindytalk

== H ==
- "The Hackney Five" by Graham Collier
- "Hackney (Suffer Little Children)" by Creaming Jesus
- "Hainault Via Newbury Park" by Doug Boyle
- "Hairdresser on Fire" by Morrissey (Sloane Square)
- "Half a Person" by The Smiths
- "Half Caste" by Thin Lizzy (Brixton)
- "Half Moon Street" by Count Basie
- "Half Moon Street" by Pete & The Pirates
- "Hammersmith" by The Transmitters
- "Hammersmith Guerilla" by Third World War (band)
- "Hammersmith Odeons" by Patrik Fitzgerald
- "Hammersmith Palais" by Demolition 23
- "Hammersmith Riff" by Vic Lewis
- "Hammersmith To Tokyo And Back" by Art of Noise
- "Hampstead" by Adam and the Ants
- "Hampstead Blues" by Ram John Holder
- "Hampstead Girl" by The Dream Academy
- "Hampstead Heath on an August Bank Holiday Sunday" by Ralph Vaughan Williams (from Symphony No 2 A London Symphony)
- "Hampstead Heath To Lose The Blues" by Ram John Holder
- "Hampstead Incident" by Donovan
- "Hampstead Therapist" by Ed Ball
- "Hampstead Way" by Linda Lewis
- "Hampton Court" by Norma Tanega
- "Hampton Court" by Syd Dale
- "Handel in the Strand" by Percy Grainger
- "Hanging Around" by The Stranglers
- "Happy Families" by Television Personalities
- "Haringey Lullaby" by Juan María Solare
- "Harley Street Special" by Doctor Ross
- "Harrods Don't Sell 'Em" by The Union
- "Harrow Accident" by The Nits
- "Harrow On The Hill" by Steve Harley
- "Harrow Road" by Big Audio Dynamite
- "The Harrow Song (The Giants of Old)" by Robert Hardy (from the play with music 'Winnie')
- "Has It Come to This?" by The Streets
- "Hat-trick" by Alan Moore and Tim Perkins (in The Highbury Working)
- "Havan (By Way Of New Orleans & Hackney)" by MFOS (aka Snowboy)
- "Haverstock Hill" from the musical 'His Monkey Wife' by Sandy Wilson
- "Hayes And Harlington Blues" by JSD Band
- "He Ain't Give You None" by Van Morrison
- "He Was A Rasta in London Town" by Wally Badarou
- "Heart O' London" by Robert Farnon (under pseudonym Ole Jensen)
- "Heart of the City" by Nick Lowe
- "Heathrow" by Level 42
- "Heathrow Holiday" by Instant Sunshine
- "Heathrow Jet" by Axel Zwingenberger
- "Heathrow Robinson" by Steve Gray
- "Heathrow Shuffle" by Van Morrison & Georgie Fame
- "Heaven" by Alan Moore and Tim Perkins (in Angel Passage – Blake's life in London)
- "Helen Wheels" by Paul McCartney
- "Hell" by Alan Moore and Tim Perkins (in Angel Passage – Blake's life in London)
- "Hello London" by Scarling
- "Helpline Operator" by The The
- "He's on the Phone" by Saint Etienne
- "He That The Reason Would Know" by Thomas Middleton and William Rowley ("These three were buried near Marybone [Marylebone] Park" – from A Fair Quarrel, 1614)
- "Herculean" by The Good, the Bad & the Queen
- "Here on the Corner of Wimpole Street" (from the musical Robert and Elizabeth)
- "Here We Are in London Town" by Peter Sarstedt
- "Here We Go" by Everton FC
- "Hersham Boys" by Sham 69 (Hersham is not in London but the words mention it)
- "Hey DJ" by World's Famous Supreme Team
- "Hey Music Lover (William Orbit Mix)" by S'Express
- "Hey Young London" by Bananarama
- "High Street (Ken)" by Jools Holland
- "Highbury Incident (Rainy July Morning)" by Stackridge
- "Highgate" by Affinity
- "Highgate" by Jah Wobble
- "Highgate Hill" by Jakko Jakszyk
- "Highgate Road Incident" by Saint Etienne
- "Highgate Shuffle" by Rod Stewart
- "High Street/Part Pedestrianised" by Billy Jenkins (from Still Sounds Like Bromley)
- "Hilly Fields (1892)" by Nick Nicely (about an area of South London, near Ladywell)
- "Hilly Fields (The Mourning)" by Nick Nicely
- "Hip City" by Poly Styrene
- "History" by The Verve (lyric based on William Blake's "London")
- "History Song" by The Good, the Bad & the Queen
- "Hit Music" by Pet Shop Boys
- "Hobart Paving" by Saint Etienne
- "The Hobnailed Boots That Farver Wore" by Billy Williams
- "Hobb's End" by The Monochrome Set
- "The Holborn Situationist" by Congregation
- "Hold Tight London" by The Chemical Brothers
- "Holiday Rap" by MC Miker G & DJ Sven
- "Holiday In London" by Norrie Paramor
- "Holland Street" by The Field Mice
- "Holland Walk" by National Youth Jazz Orchestra
- "Holloway" by Kenny Clarke/Francy Boland Big Band
- "Holloway Boulevard" by The Popes
- "Holloway Girl" by Marillion
- "Holloway Jail" by The Kinks
- "Hollywood (Down on your Luck)" by Thin Lizzy
- "Home For a Rest" by Spirit of the West
- "Homerton B" by Unknown T
- "Hometown" from London Rhapsody by Flanagan & Allen
- "Hometown Glory" by Adele
- "Hong Kong Garden" by Siouxsie and the Banshees
- "Hooky Street" by John Sullivan (Shepherds Bush etc. – Only Fools And Horses theme)
- "Hoover Factory" by Elvis Costello
- "The Horse Guards – Whitehall" by Haydn Wood
- "Horse Guards, Whitehall" by Haydn Wood (from London Landmarks Suite)
- "Hot Shot Tottenham" by Tottenham Hotspur FC
- "Hot Stuff" by The Rolling Stones
- "Hotel in Brixton" by Baxter Dury
- "Hotel Columbia" by Jesse Malin
- "Hounslow Boys" by Robb Johnson
- "House of Bamboo" by Earl Grant Andy Williams (Soho)
- "House on the Hill" by Kevin Coyne (Brixton Square)
- "Howitt Road" by Honest John Plain (Belsize Park)
- "How's Life in London" by London Posse
- "Hoxton Hair" by Parka
- "Hoxton Heroes" by Girls Aloud
- "Hullo! Miss London" by Victoria Monks
- "Hungerford Bridge" by Underworld And Gabriel Yared
- "Hunting for Witches" by Bloc Party (mentions the "30 bus")
- "Hurry On Home To London" by Airbus
- "Hyde Park" by Duke Ellington and his Orchestra
- "Hyde Park" by Funki Porcini
- "Hyde Park 2 am" by Louis Bellson
- "Hyde Park Angels" by Jonathan Kelly
- "Hyde Park Corner Investigation" by Dennis Bovell
- "Hyde Park Song" by Mike Westbrook
- "Hype Talk" by Dizzee Rascal

== I ==
- "I Am A Man From Lewisham" by Billy Jenkins (musician)
- "I Can't Believe It's Been A Little Less Than A Year" by StarKid Productions
- "Ici Londres" by Chiara Mastroianni
- "I Dig Everything" by David Bowie ("I feed the lions in Trafalgar Square")
- "I Do The Rock" by Tim Curry (Moscow Road)
- "(I Don't Want to Go to) Chelsea" by Elvis Costello
- "I Fell in Love With a Female Plumber From Harlesden NW10" by Splodgenessabounds
- "I giardini di Kensington" by Patty Pravo
- "I.K.B. – R.I.P." by Frank Tovey (Westway, Isle of Dogs, Millwall docks)
- "I Like London" by Lionel Monckton and Arthur Wimperis (from The Arcadians, 1909)
- "I Like London in the Rain" by Blossom Dearie
- "I Live in Camberwell" by Basement Jaxx
- "I Live in Style in Maida Vale" by The Hammersmith Gorillas
- "I Live in Trafalgar Square" by Clarence Wainwright Murphy
- "I Love Lambeth" by The Monochrome Set
- "I Love London" by Crystal Fighters
- "I Love London" by Lorraine Bowen
- "I Love London" by Tommy Page
- "I Luv U" by Dizzee Rascal
- "I Might Be Lyin'" by Eddie & The Hot Rods ('The Strand')
- "I Was There (At the Coronation)" by Young Tiger
- "I'd Like to go on a London Spree ... Then come with me! ..." from The Spring Chicken
- "I'd Never Know" by Noël Coward ("Why is the Springtime giving London this lovely glow?")
- "Idiot Child" by Madness ("Spunky little kid from North West Five")
- "If I Can't Get to London" by David Craig Simpson
- "If I Could" by David Essex ("Canning Town" etc.)
- "If I Left London" by Christopher Curtis (from Chaplin)
- "If I Ruled The World" by Kurtis Blow
- "If It Wasn't for the 'Ouses In Between" by Edgar Bateman and George Le Brunn (1894, sung by Gus Elen – "With a ladder and some glasses you can see to Hackney Marshes")
- "If London Were Venice" by The Venetians
- "If You're Anxious For To Shine" from Patience (opera) ("If you walk down Piccadilly with a poppy or a lily in your mediaeval hand")
- "Il Pleut Sur Londres" by Sylvie Vartan
- "Ill Manors" by Plan B
- "Illegal Gunshot" by Ragga Twins
- "Ilya Kuryakin Looked at Me" from Cleaners from Venus (Wardour Street)
- "I'm a Waterloo House Young Man" from Patience (opera)
- "I'm Alright Jack" by Tom Robinson Band (Hampstead)
- "I'm Forever Blowing Bubbles" by Cockney Rejects ('West Ham')
- "I'm Goin' To Settle Down Outside Of London Town" by Irving Kaufman (singer)
- "I'm Going to Get Lit Up When the Lights Go Up in London" by Hubert Gregg (end of the WW2 blackout)
- "I'm In London Again" (from Baker Street (musical))
- "I'm Old Fashioned" by Noël Coward and Johnny Mercer ("Those nightingales in Berkeley Square")
- "I'm the Face" by The High Numbers
- "I'm Riffin' (English Rasta)" by MC Duke
- "I'm Trying to Make London My Home" by Sonny Boy Williamson
- "I must leave London" by Piano Magic
- "Impressions of London" by Ronald Binge
- "In a Golden Coach" by Billy Cotton
- "In a London Cab (Before The Rain)" by Anastasia
- "In Aallen Kneipen Von Soho" by Caterina Valente
- "In Bedlam" by Creed Taylor Orchestra
- "In Bond Street" by The Young Idea (featuring Tony Cox (record producer))
- "In Brixton" by Matumbi
- "In Der Carnaby Street" by Peggy March
- "In Foggy Old London" by Burl Ives
- "In Gay Mayfair" (from the musical comedy The Belle of Mayfair)
- "In Gunnersbury Park" by The Hit Parade
- "In Iverna Gardens" by The Lilac Time
- "In London" by Iain Matthews
- "In London" by Johnny Logan
- "In London" by Vangelis & Neuronium
- "In Old Kent Road" by Arthur Seldon
- "In Soho Late At Night" by Barb Jungr & Michael Parker
- "In The City" by The Jam
- "In The City" by Madness
- "In The Country" by Skepta
- "In The Streets of London" by The Business
- "Incident At Mudchute" by The Recedents (featuring Mike Cooper (musician))
- "Inelegantly Wasted in Papa's Penthouse Pad in Belgravia" by The Weekenders
- "Inner City Rap" by Ti2bs (Haringey)
- "Inner London Violence" by Bad Manners
- "Innocence" by Alan Moore and Tim Perkins (in Angel Passage about William Blake's life in London)
- "Initials BB" by Serge Gainsbourg
- "Inspirations Of London" by Ambros Seelos
- "Interlude – London Massive" by Aphrodite
- "Into Orbit" by Adamski (a reference to the M25 (London Orbital) Acid House scene in 1988/1989)
- "Into The Heart Of Dalston" by Snowpony
- "Isabel Makes Love Upon National Monuments" by Jake Thackray ("With style and enthusiasm and anyone at all, Isabel makes love in the Royal Albert Hall")
- "Isle of Clerkenwell" by Harry H. Corbett
- "The Islington Ballroom" by Richard Digance
- "Itchycoo Park" by Small Faces
- "It Ain't Necessarily Bird Avenue (Byrd Avenue)" by Spanky and Our Gang
- "It Could Be You" by Blur
- "It's Fun Finding Out About London Town" by Billie Anthony
- "It Gets Me Talked About" by Albert Chevalier and Alfred H. West ("Playin' 'ind legs of the helephant in East End pantomime")
- "It's Grim Up North London" by The KLF
- "It's Fun Finding Out About London Town" by Billie Anthony
- "It's a Great Big Shame" by Gus Elen
- "It's a Long Way to Tipperary" by Jack Judge and Harry Williams
- "It's A Long Way To Wembley But Less Than 7 Days To Saturday Afternoon" by Robb Johnson
- "It's Lovely To Be Back in London" by Judy Garland
- "It's Nice to go Trav'ling" by Sammy Cahn and Jimmy Van Heusen
- "It's Only Me" by Noël Coward ("Once I knew a kid, she used to live down Poplar way")
- "I've Brought you Over and set you Down in the Last Edition of London Town..." by Howard Ashman, Tim Rice and Chad Beguelin (from the musical comedy The New Aladdin)

== J ==
- "Jack in London City" by Fiddler's Dram
- "Jack Talking" by Dave Stewart and The Spiritual Cowboys
- "Jack The Ripper" by Screaming Lord Sutch
- "Jacob Street 7 am"[I] by Sabres of Paradise
- "Jacques Derrida" by Scritti Politti (Camden Town)
- "Jag älskar London" by Povel Ramel
- "Jah War" by The Ruts
- "Jam It Jam" by She Rockers
- "Jamming in London" by Master Musicians of Jajouka/Talvin Singh
- "Jarrow Song" by Alan Price
- "Jazz Cafe Theme" by James Taylor Quartet
- "Jazzie's Groove" by Soul II Soul
- "Jeffrey Goes to Leicester Square" by Jethro Tull
- "Jennifer, Julie And Josephine" by Television Personalities (Goldsmiths College)
- "Jets Seem Slower in London's Skies" by Martha & The Muffins
- "Jimmy on the Central Line" by John Illsley
- "Joe Meek" by Wreckless Eric
- "Johnny The Horse" by Madness ("To Regent's Park at sunset")
- "Joyful Noise" by Donald Swann
- "John Paul (Is on His Way To Wembley)" by Dermot Morgan
- "John Willie, Come On" by George Formby, Sr. ("We went in Madame Tussauds waxwork show and it were grand")
- "Johnnie Came From London Town For A Bit Of Fun" from A Country Girl
- "Johnnie Reggae" by Big Youth
- "Johnny Come Lately" by Steve Earle (from Copperhead Road)
- "Jubilee Gardens" by Robb Johnson
- "Jubilee Line" by Wilbur Soot (from "Your City Gave Me Asthma" album)
- "Juggle Tings Proper" by Roots Manuva (south-west London, Peckham)
- "Jungle" by Professor Green (Hackney)
- "Jungle West One" by Jimmy Pursey
- "Junkie Doll" by Mark Knopfler (from Sailing to Philadelphia album; he mentions both Turnpike Lane and Turnham Green)
- "Just For Kicks" by Mike Sarne
- "Just For Money" by Paul Hardcastle ("the (Wormwood) Scrubs" etc.)
- "Just Keep Rockin'" by Double Trouble and Rebel MC
- "Justice In Knightsbridge" by Robb Johnson

== K ==
- "Kayleigh" by Marillion (Belsize Park)
- "Ken" by Kate Bush (from GLC: The Carnage Continues...)
- "Kensington Cowboy" by East of Eden
- "Kensington Garden" by Marc Jordan
- "Kensington Gardens" by The Shirts
- "Kensington Gardens" by Trembling Blue Stars
- "The Kensington Girl" by The Cleaners from Venus
- "Kensington Palace Confusion" by Dennis Bovell
- "Kent Road Skank" by I-Roy
- "Kentish Town Waltz" by Imelda May featuring Lou Reed
- "Kentish Town" by Tracey Thorn
- "Kenton Kev" by The Magoo Brothers
- "Kew" by Billy Nicholls
- "Kew Gardens" by Ralph McTell
- "Kew Gardens Blues" by Richard Maltby Sr.
- "Kick!" by Adam & The Ants
- "Kick The Geordie / Kick The Cockney" by Hellbastard
- "Kid From Camden Town" from Trottie True
- "The Kid From Kensington" by Dogs D'Amour
- "Kilburn High Road" by Shack
- "Kilburn Lane" by Ranking Dread
- "Kilburn Lane" by Wreckless Eric
- "The Kilburn High Road" by Flogging Molly
- "Kilburn Stroll" by Damien Dempsey
- "The Killers of W1" by Tubby Hayes Orchestra
- "Kingdom Of Fitzrovia" by Jah Wobble and Bill Sharpe
- "King George Street" by Squeeze (King George Street is in Greenwich, South London)
- "The King Is Still In London" by The Happy Gang (featuring Robert Farnon)
- "King of Birds" by R.E.M. (refers to Trafalgar Square)
- "King of London" from Kean (musical)
- "King of Stamford Hill" by Reeves Gabrells, David Bowie and Gary Oldman (refers to Marc Bolan)
- "Kingly Street" by Chris Corcoran Trio
- "King's Cross" by Pet Shop Boys (also covered by Tracey Thorn)
- "King's Cross" by Cinerama
- "King's Cross Blues" by Lindisfarne
- "Kings Cross/Daybreak" by Raw Stylus
- "King's Cross Etc" by The Apostles
- "King's Road" by Heron
- "King's Road" by Tom Petty
- "King's Road Blues" by Quincy Jones
- "King's Road Boogaloo" by Louis Bellson
- "Kings Road Chelsea" by Leslie McKeown
- "King's Road Girl" by Ann Odell (ex-member of Blue Mink)
- "Kinky Reggae" by Bob Marley & The Wailers
- "Klub Londinium 20-30 (League Of The Delirious)" by Sudden Sway
- "Knees Up Mother Brown" by Elsie & Doris Waters
- "A Knife for the Girls" by The Long Blondes
- "Knightsbridge March" by Eric Coates (from London Suite)
- "Knocked 'Em in the Old Kent Rd" by Albert Chevalier
- "Kray Twins" by Mo-dettes
- "Kray Twins" by Renegade Soundwave
- "Kung Fu Battle Ina Brixton" by Prince Fatty & Horseman

== L ==
- "La Fille De Londres" by Catherine Sauvage
- "La Seine Et La Tamise" by Petula Clark
- "The Labyrinth of Limehouse" by Marc Almond
- "Ladbroke Groove" by DJ Spinna
- "Ladbroke Grove" by AJ Tracey
- "Ladbroke Grove Blues" by Ram John Holder (1969)
- "Ladies of London Town" by Frank Turner (from Sleep Is for the Week, 2007)
- "Lady Grinning Soul" by David Bowie (London)
- "The Lady is a Tramp" by Buddy Greco
- "Lady Soho" by Carlos Franzetti
- "Lambeth" by Burial
- "The Lambeth Trot" by Wild Willy Barrett
- "The Lambeth Walk" by Noel Gay (from Me and My Girl, 1937)
- "The Lambeth Waltz" by Vera Lynn (1953)
- "Landing in London" by 3 Doors Down ft. Bob Seger
- "The Lass of London City" by Nic Jones
- "Last Flight To Abu Dhabi" by Billy Bragg (mentions Chelsea FC)
- "Last Gang in Town" by The Clash
- "The Last Living Rose" by PJ Harvey
- "Last Night in Soho" by Dave Dee, Dozy, Beaky, Mick and Tich
- "Last Round-up In Deptford" by Flying Pickets
- "Last Tango in London" by Mud
- "Last Train to Clapham Junction" by The Business
- "Last Train to Dagenham" by Cock Sparrer
- "Last Train to London" by Electric Light Orchestra
- "Last Train to London" by Mimi Webb
- "Last Train To Trancentral" by The KLF (Trancentral was their studio in Stockwell)
- "Last Words" by The Real Tuesday Weld ("Over Elgin Avenue a helium balloon...")
- "Latchmere" by The Maccabees
- "Latchmere Allotments" by The Orb
- "Late Night London" by Syd Dale
- "Late Train To London" by Darden Smith
- "Latin American Girl In London Town" by Thunderpussy
- "Latin Music" by Kid Creole and the Coconuts
- "Latitude" by Elton John
- "The Laughing Gnome" by David Bowie (London School of Economics)
- "Lavender Hill" by Dana Gillespie
- "Lavender Hill" by The Kinks
- "Lazing On A Sunday Afternoon by Queen
- "LDN" by Lily Allen
- "Le Blues De Londres" by Dick Annegarn
- "Le Fille De Londres" by Catherine Sauvage
- "Le Piccadilly" by Erik Satie
- "Lea Bridge Stomp" by Freddy Randall
- "Lea Valley Bridge" by Ray Dexter (English country singer)
- "Leapin' In London" by John Dankworth
- "Leave the Capitol" by The Fall
- "Leave The City and Come Home" by The Rakes
- "Leaving London" by Tom Paxton
- "The Leaving of London" by Bevis Frond
- "Lee Navigation" by Saint Etienne
- "Legato Leicester Square" by Betty Roe
- "Leicester Square" by DJ SS
- "Leicester Square" by Rancid (band)
- "Leicester Square Rag" by Harry Roy
- "Lesney Factory" by Saint Etienne
- "Let London Be Nice Again" by Joseph Cotton
- "Let's All Go Down The Strand" by C.W. Murphy and Harry Castling (music hall standard)
- "Let's Dance" by Chris Rea & Bob Mortimer
- "Let's Push Things Forward" by The Streets
- "Let's Submerge" by X Ray Spex ("going down to the Underground")
- "Let's Womble to the Party Tonight" by The Wombles (Wimbledon)
- "Letter 2 London" by Coachwhips
- "Lewisham McDeez" by The Square
- "Leyton Art Inferno" by Saint Etienne
- "The Liberty of Norton Folgate" by Madness
- "The Life Auction: Impressions Of Southall From The Train" by The Strawbs
- "Life Begins at Oxford Circus" by Jack Hylton and His Orchestra
- "Life from a Window" by The Jam
- "Life in London" by Mighty Terror
- "Life in London" by Noel Harrison
- "Life in London" by Pat Travers Band
- "Life Is A Long Song" by Jethro Tull (Baker Street)
- "Life Is True in London Town" by Wallenstein
- "Light at the End of the Tunnel" by Half Man Half Biscuit (about a girl moving to Notting Hill)
- "Light Skin Girl from London" by Lenny Kravitz
- "Lightning Strikes (Not Once But Twice)" by The Clash (The Westway; Ladbroke Grove; Hounslow)
- "Lights of London" by David Gray
- "Lights Out" by UFO
- "Limehouse" by Fats Waller (from The London Suite)
- "Limehouse Cut" by Jah Wobble
- "Limehouse Nights" by George Gershwin
- "Limehouse Reach" by Ian Wallace (singer)
- "Lions" by Dire Straits (mentions – The Cutty Sark, Tea Clipper in dry dock at Greenwich)
- "Lions of Charing Cross" by Blow Monkeys
- "Little Miss Pipedream" by The Wombats ("cause foggy London town's not built for me or you")
- "Little Miss Portobello" by Kevin Coyne
- "The Little Old Church Near Leicester Square" by Freddy Martin
- "The Little Old Lady Of Threadneedle Street" by Kay Kyser and his Orchestra
- "Little Russell Street" by Nine Below Zero
- "Liv Togevver (The Greater London Funkathon)" by Light of the World
- "Live At London" by Charly Lownoise and Mental Theo (this is not a live record but the name of the tune)
- "Live From (Da Big Smoke)" by Blak Twang
- "Live in Trouble" by The Barron Knights (Walthamstow, Tower Bridge, Catford, etc.)
- "Liverpool Street" by Warm Jets
- "Livin' In Hackney" by Outlaw Posse
- "Living Here In London" by Foster & Allen
- "Living in London" by Brendan Shine
- "Living in London" by Starry Eyed and Laughing
- "Living in London" by Wiley
- "Living in Tottenham" by Frank Chickens
- "Living with Unemployment" by Newtown Neurotics
- "Loftholdingswood" by Microdisney
- "Lola" by The Kinks
- "Londinium" by Archive
- "Londinium" by Catatonia
- "L-ON-D-ON" by Bassvictim
- "L-O-N-D-O-N" by Screaming Lord Sutch
- "L.O.N.D.O.N." (London) by Leslie Bricusse
- "L.O.N.D.O.N. Town" by Craig McLachlan And Check 1-2
- "Lon Don" by The Passage (band)
- "London" by μ-Ziq
- "London" by AJ and Deno featuring EO
- "London" by Alanis Morissette
- "London" by Alessi
- "London" by Amen Andrews (an alias of Luke Vibert)
- "London" by Barry Manilow
- "London" by Ben Howard
- "London" by Billy Field
- "London" by Bowling for Soup
- "London" by Chava Alberstein
- "London" by Chris Stamey
- "London" by David Axelrod
- "London" by Eddie Floyd
- "London" by Frida Hyvönen
- "London" by Gil Evans
- "London" by Girlschool
- "London" by Gordon Giltrap
- "London" by Harpo
- "London" by International Observer
- "London" by Jeff Lang
- "London" by June Brown
- "London" by The Junkies
- "London" by Maty Noyes
- "London" by SparklehorseNational Youth Jazz Orchestra
- "London" by National Youth Jazz Orchestra
- "London" by Nick Heyward
- "London" by Nicky Thomas
- "London" by Noonday Underground
- "London" by Patrick Wolf
- "London" by Pet Shop Boys
- "London" by Porcupine Tree
- "London" by Queensrÿche
- "London" by Roger Hodgson
- "London" by Roy Reid (aka I-Roy)
- "London" by The Rumble Strips
- "London" by Sandie Shaw
- "London" by Sandy Denny Thea Gilmore
- "London" by The Smiths
- "London" by Smoke City
- "London" by Sparklehorse
- "London" by Steeleye Span
- "London" by Tangerine Dream (Tyger)
- "London" by Thea Gilmore
- "London" by They Might Be Giants
- "London" by Third Eye Blind
- "London" by Timati and Grigory Leps
- "London" by Tina Dico
- "London" by Vanessa Carlton
- "London Aquarium" by Chris T-T
- "London A Rose" by Arthur Louis
- "London A to Z" by Deacon Blue
- "London A Weh Live" by Penfold, Fathead (musician) & Tenor Fly
- "London After Midnight" by The Flaming Stars
- "London Again Suite – Oxford Street, Langham Place, Mayfair"[I] by Eric Coates
- "London Air" by Elvin Jones
- "London Airport" by Raymond Scott
- "London at Night" by Noël Coward
- "London Babu" by Priya Himesh
- "London Beach" by TV Smith
- "The London Beau" by Elton Hayes
- "London Beckoned Songs About Money Written by Machines" by Panic! at the Disco
- "London Belongs To Me" by Max Miller (comedian)
- "London Belongs To Me" by Saint Etienne
- "London Berry Blues" by Chuck Berry
- "London Between the Fires" by Soho
- "London Blue" by David Lanz
- "London Blues" by Canned Heat
- "London Blues" by Jelly Roll Morton
- "London Blues" by Rosie (featured David Lasley)
- "London Bitch" by 50 Cent
- "London Bombs" by Eskimo Joe
- "London Born" by King Prawn
- "London Bouncers" by Action Pact!
- "London Boy" by Donae'o
- "London Boy" by Taylor Swift
- "London Boys" by Anti Nowhere League
- "The London Boys" by David Bowie
- "The London Boys" by Tommy Bruce
- "London Boys" by T. Rex
- "London Boys" by Johnny Thunders
- "London Boys" by The Times
- "London Boys" by The Go-Go's
- "London Bridge" by Big Audio Dynamite
- "London Bridge" by Bread
- "London Bridge" by Cilla Black
- "London Bridge" by Dogs
- "London Bridge" by Ed Sheeran ft Yelawolf (from The Slumdon Bridge 2012)
- "London Bridge" by Fergie
- "London Bridge" by Frederic Weatherly
- "London Bridge" by Jakko Jakszyk
- "London Bridge" by Joe Gibbs
- "London Bridge" by Mighty Sparrow
- "London Bridge (London Bridge is Broken Down)" by Mike Westbrook
- "London Bridge Has Fallen" by Ras Michael & The Sons of Negus
- "London Bridge is Falling Down" – composer unknown (nursery rhyme)
- "London Bridge is Falling Down" by Kirsty MacColl
- "London Bridge Special" by King Tubby Meets Roots Radics
- "London Bridges" by Vince DiCola
- "London Burning" by Enos McLeod
- "London's Burning" by Clash
- "London By Bus" by Lionel Bart
- "London By Night" by Carroll Coates (recorded by Frank Sinatra)
- "London Bye Ta-Ta" by David Bowie
- "London Cafe Blues" by King Oliver
- "London Calling" by Eric Coates
- "London Calling" by The Clash
- "London Calling" by The Lambrettas
- "London Calls" by Billy Cotton
- "London, Can You Wait" by Gene
- "London Chimes" by Paul Hardcastle
- "London City" by Back to the Planet
- "London City" by Devlin
- "London City" by Freedom
- "London City" by Jah Thomas
- "London City" by Otto Sieben (pseudonym of Gerhard Narholz)
- "London City Rock" by U-Roy
- "London Cold" by Yellowman
- "London Conversation" by John Martyn
- "London Crawlng" by Rialto
- "London Danny" by Jez Lowe
- "London Derriere" by Manny Albam
- "London Derriere" by Quincy Jones
- "London Deserted" by John Murphy
- "London-Donnie" by Don Byas
- "London Drunk" by Swingin' Utters
- "London Dub" by Ruts DC
- "London Dungeon" by The Misfits
- "London Dungeons" by Congo Natty (aka Rebel MC)
- "London England" by Corduroy
- "London Eye" by Regular Fries
- "The London Eye" by Robb Johnson
- "London Fair" by Ole Jensen aka Robert Farnon
- "London Fantasia" by Alberto Semprini
- "London Fantasy" by Nolwenn Leroy
- "London Fields" by Chris Connelly
- "London Fields" by Energy Orchard
- "London Fields" by Sleeping States
- "London Fog" by Oliver Nelson Orchestra
- "London For Christmas" by Limahl
- "London Gangs" by Sault
- "London Gay" by The Mighty Duke
- "A London Ghetto" by Ram John Holder
- "London Girl" by 50 Cent
- "London Girl" by The Jam
- "London Girl" by The Pogues
- "London Girl" by Toyan
- "London Girls" by Chas & Dave (also covered by Tori Amos)
- "London Girls" by Dave Warner
- "London Girls" by Kirsty MacColl (theme tune to sitcom Dream Stuffing)
- "London Girls" by Rosetta Stone
- "London Girls" by Stephen Duffy
- "London Girls" by The Vibrators
- "London Girls" by Yellow Dog
- "London, Good-bye" by Car-Man
- "London Groove" by Airtight (includes Nick Nicely)
- "London Hates You" by The Kills
- "London, Here in London the Ideal Will not all be Undone..." by Howard Ashman, Tim Rice and Chad Beguelin (from the comedy musical The New Aladdin)
- "London Hilton" by Keith Mansfield
- "London Homesick Blues" by Gary P. Nunn sung by Jerry Jeff Walker
- "London Hornpipe" by Fiddling "Tater" Tate With Red Smiley & The Blue Grass Cut-Ups
- "London Hymn" by Josh Groban
- "The London I Love" by Vera Lynn (1941, by George Posford and Harold Purcell)
- "London (I'm Coming To See You)" by Glen Campbell
- "London Interlude" by Lonnie Liston Smith
- "London in July" by Corky Hale
- "London in the Rain" by Jeff Beck Band & Upp
- "London in the Rain" by Marc Jordan
- "London in the Rain" by Puressence
- "London in the Springtime (London Chimes)" by Paul Hardcastle
- "London in Terror" by Motionless in White
- "London Irish" by The Divine Comedy
- "London (Is A Little Bit of All Right)" by Noël Coward
- "London Is A Village" by Maxine Daniels
- "London Is Behind Me" by Justin Hayward
- "London Is Burning" by Mark Spiro
- "London Is Burning" by Smokie
- "London Is London" by The Nolans
- "London Is Lonely" by Holly Humberstone
- "London Is Mine" by White Rose Movement
- "London Is My Cup of Tea" by Acker Bilk
- "London Is The Biz" by The Firm (novelty band)
- "London Is The Place for Me" by Lord Kitchener
- "London Is The Reason" by Gallows
- "London Isn't Smiling Anymore" by Jack Jones
- "London Johnnies" music by Carlton Kelsey and Maurice Rubens; lyrics by Clifford Grey
- "London Kid" by Jean Michel Jarre
- "London Lady" by The Stranglers (mentions 'Dingwalls' nightblub)
- "London Lawa Yo" by Ebenezer Obey
- "London Leatherboys" by Accept
- "London Leaves" by Boxcar Willie
- "London Letters" by The Nits
- "London Life" by Anita Harris
- "London Life" by Down to the Bone
- "London Life" by Ian & Sylvia
- "London Life" by Syd Dale
- "London London" by The Regents
- "London, London - My Hometown" by Dave Lee (jazz musician)
- "London London" by Caetano Veloso
- "London Look" by Herman's Hermits
- "London Loves" by Blur
- "London, Luck and Love" by Hall & Oates
- "London Madrid" by The Aislers Set
- "London Massive" by London Posse
- "London Mine" by Joy Crookes
- "London Mourning in Ashes" by Ewan MacColl
- "London Movie" by Glen Brown
- "London My Town" by Anthony Adverse
- "London My Home Town" by The Chantelles
- "London Nights" by Dawnstar
- "London Nights" by London Boys
- "London On A Rainy Night" by Ambrose (bandleader)
- "London On Sea" by Robb Johnson
- "London Overgrown" by John Foxx
- "A London Overture" by John Ireland
- "A London Overture" by Philip Sparke
- "London Pageant" by Arnold Bax
- "London-Paris" by Gazebo (musician)
- "London-Paris" by Pizzicato Five
- "London Paris Rome Blues Express" by Ram John Holder
- "London Particular" by The Ethical Debating Society (about the Heygate estate, Elephant and Castle)
- "London Patola" by Jazzie B
- "London People" by Friends, Lovers & Family
- "London Pieces" by John Ireland
- "London Plantation" by Mad Professor
- "London Posse" by London Posse
- "London Posse" by Toyan
- "London Pregnancy Test 1976" by Experimental Pop Band
- "London Pride" by Noël Coward
- "London Punk" by Michael Gray (DJ)
- "London Queen" by Charli XCX from Sucker 2014
- "London Queen of My Heart" by Cath Carroll
- "London Rain" by Jah Wobble
- "London Rain (Nothing Heals Me Like you Do)" by Heather Nova
- "London Revisited" by Ray Russell
- "London Rhythm" by Mills Brothers
- "London River" by Fairport Convention
- "London Rock" by Al Campbell
- "London Rock" by BK vs. Ali Wilson
- "London Rock" by Tony Crombie
- "London Rock" by U Brown
- "London Rock" by The Zanies (featuring Davie Allan)
- "London Rocker" by Screaming Lord Sutch & The Savages
- "London Samba" by Joyce Moreno (musician)
- "London Skank" by Jah Thomas
- "London Skies" by Jamie Cullum
- "London Skies" by Glen Goldsmith
- "London Skies London Eyes" by Little Man Tate
- "London Skyline" by Acoustic Alchemy
- "London Song" by The Breeders
- "London Song" by Ray Davies
- "London Song" by Mike Westbrook
- "London Song" by Ninajirachi
- "London Song" by Seatrain
- "London Sound" by The Freestylers
- "London South" by Nick Nicely
- "London Special" by Champion Jack Dupree
- "London Still" by The Waifs
- "London Stomp" by Bo Diddley
- "London Stone" by Bevis Frond
- "London Story" by England
- "London Suite" by Fats Waller (recorded 1939 in London)
- "London Suite" by Louis Bellson
- "London Sun" by Wheatus
- "A London Symphony" by Ralph Vaughan Williams
- "London Symphony" by Joseph Haydn
- "London Talking" by Ian Dury
- "London Talking Blues" by Jeremy Taylor (singer)
- "London Tango" by Sydney Thompson (musician) and his Orchestra
- "London Taps" music and lyrics by John Golden lyrics by John E. Hazzard
- "The London Theme" by John Barry
- "The London Theme" by Ron Goodwin
- "London Thing" by Ranking Dread
- "London Times" by Radio Heart and Gary Numan
- "London To Birmingham" by Jah Woosh
- "London To Gaza" by Gilad Atzmon
- "London Tonight" by Collapsed Lung
- "London Tonight" by Skinny (band)
- "London Town" by Bellowhead
- "London Town" by Bill Summers and Summers Heat
- "London Town" by Bucks Fizz
- "London Town" by Dennis Alcapone
- "London Town" by Donovan
- "London Town" by Dub Pistols
- "London Town" by Sir Edward German
- "London Town" by Gene Chandler a k a The Duke of Earl
- "London Town" by Guido & Maurizio De Angelis
- "London Town" by Helen Trix
- "London Town" by The Holloways
- "London Town" by James Taylor
- "London Town" by John Bundrick
- "London Town" by Jon Pertwee
- "London Town" by Kano
- "London Town" by Kobo Town
- "London Town" by Kosmos Express
- "London Town" by Laura Marling
- "London Town" by Lally Stott
- "London Town" by Lena Fiagbe
- "London Town" by Les Humphries
- "London Town" by Light of the World
- "London Town" by Master Shortie
- "London Town" by Mick Taylor
- "London Town" by Mike Read
- "London Town" by Oliver Onions
- "London Town" by Paul McCartney & Wings
- "London Town" by The Pretty Things
- "London Town" by Ralph Reader
- "London Town" by Rolf Harris
- "London Town" by Ronald Binge
- "London Town" by Shack
- "London Town" by Shawn Phillips
- "London Town" by Special Duties
- "London Town" by Stanley Holloway
- "London Town" by Tetsu Yamauchi
- "London Town C'mon Down" by Roger Taylor
- "London Town Girl" by Epitaph
- "London Town (You Haunt Me)" from The Co-Optimists
- "London Traffic" by Giorgio
- "London Traffic" by The Jam
- "London Trios" by Joseph Haydn
- "London Tu Nachdi" by Apache Indian
- "London Underground" by Amateur Transplants
- "London Underground" by Gregg Karukas
- "London Underground" by Julian Cope
- "London Waltz" by Richard Fariña
- "The London We Live In " by Arthur Mullard
- "London West One" by Joe Henderson
- "The London Whine Company" by McLusky
- "London You're a Lady" by The Pogues
- "Londonola" by Roy Fox
- "London's A Lonely Town" by Dave Edmunds
- "London's After Work Drinking Culture" by John Howard (singer-songwriter) and The Night Mail
- "London's Brilliant" by Elvis Costello (recorded by Wendy James)
- "London's Brilliant Parade" by Elvis Costello
- "London's Burning" by Big Youth
- "London's Burning" by The Clash
- "London's Burning" by Grace Petrie
- "London's Burning" by Johnny Warman
- "London's Finest" by Simon Harris
- "London's Fog" by Mikis Theodorakis
- "London's Lottery" by Ewan MacColl
- "London's Low Market Pricing" by Eric Van Der Westen's Quadrant Extended
- "London's Mine" by White Rose Movement
- "London's Not Too Far" by Hank Marvin
- "London's Song" by Matt Hartke
- "London's Up For Sale" by Leslie Crowther
- "Londres" by Brazzaville
- "Lonely in London" by Betty Roe
- "Lonely London" by Jah Wobble
- "Long Island" by Trevor Rabin
- "Long Live Rock" by The Who (about a Who concert in London at the Rainbow Theatre)
- "Looking Down on London" by Komputer
- "Looking Down on London" by T. V. Smith's Explorers
- "Looking For Mugs in the Strand" by George Formby Snr
- "The Lord Abides in London" from Sherlock Holmes: The Musical
- "The Lord Mayor's Show" by Jack Payne (bandleader)
- "Lords Pavilion" by Instant Sunshine
- "Lorelei" by Lonnie Donegan
- "Los Peckham Ryos" by Instant Sunshine
- "Losing Haringey" by The Clientele
- "Lost In London" by The Tangent
- "Lost on the High Street" by Colour Me Wednesday (about Uxbridge)
- "Love On The Northern Line" by Northern Line (band)
- "Lovedrive" by The Scorpions
- "Lovely Bermondsey" by Dick Emery
- "Lovely London" by Monty Norman
- "Lovely London Town" by Gwyneth Herbert (from the musical The A-Z of Mrs P)
- "Lovely Money" by The Damned (Soho, Tower of London etc.)
- "Lovers of London" by Linus
- "Lovers In Hyde Park" by Bill Shepherd (arranger for the Bee Gees)
- "London is the reason" by Gallows
- "Lucifer Over London" by Current 93
- "Lucky in London" by A Witness
- "Lullaby of London" by The Pogues

== M ==
- "M25" by Adamski
- "M25" by Jah Wobble
- "M4 Freedom Talking Blues" by Spike Milligan & Jeremy Taylor
- "Mack The Knife" by Bertolt Brecht and Kurt Weill (John Willett's translation references the Strand, Embankment and Soho)
- "Mad Not Mad" by Madness ("Dancing over Big Ben")
- "Mad Bess of Bedlam" by Kathleen Ferrier
- "Mad Tom of Bedlam" by Jolie Holland
- "Madam Tussauds" by DJ SS
- "Magic's Back" (Theme From 'The Ghosts of Oxford Street')" by Malcolm McLaren
- "Maids of Bond Street" by David Bowie
- "Maida Aida" by The Nips
- "Maida Vale" by Linda Hoyle
- "Man From Shooters Hill" by Keith Hudson
- "Man I Hate Your Band" by Little Man Tate
- "Man on the Tube" by The Passions
- "Man Out of Time" by Elvis Costello (references Knightsbridge and Traitors' Gate)
- "Marble Arch" by Clifford T Ward
- "Marble Arch" by Dave Brubeck Quartet
- "Marble Arch" by Roddy Frame
- "Marcel's" by Herman's Hermits (Wapping)
- "Marcie Dreams of Deptford" by Saint Etienne
- "Mario's Cafe" by Saint Etienne
- "Marshalsea" by Ivor Raymonde
- "Martell" by The Cribs
- "Martin" by Tom Robinson Band (Clapham)
- "Mascara" by Dream Wife (Mascara Bar [Stamford Hill], Clapton, Hackney Downs)
- "The Masher King of Piccadilly" by Richard Corney Grain
- "Mash It Up Harry" by Ian Dury (Wembley, Wembley Way, Harold Hill etc.)
- "Maskenball bei Scotland Yard" by Bill Ramsey
- "Maudie Golightly" by Noël Coward ("Though she had a flat in Albemarle Street")
- "Maybe It's Because I'm a Londoner" by Hubert Gregg
- "Mayfair" by Eric Coates (from London Again Suite)
- "Mayfair" by Nick Drake
- "Mayfair" by The Quireboys
- "Mayfair Affair" from Kean (musical)
- "Mayfair Model" by Ray Martin (orchestra leader)
- "Me And Mr Jones" by Amy Winehouse (Brixton)
- "Me and My Desire (Meanwhile in a Luxury Dockland Home)" by Television Personalities (Tower Bridge, London Docklands)
- "Me, Certainly Me" by A.D. River and James Moody ("I came up to London and walked down the Strand")
- "Medicine Show" by Big Audio Dynamite
- "Meet Me At The Strand" by Monty Norman
- "Meet Me in Battersea Park" by Petula Clark
- "Meltdown (At Madame Tussaud's)" by Steve Taylor
- "Memories of 3rd Base" by Skream
- "Memories Of Camden By The Canal" by Jah Wobble
- "Memory of a Free Festival" by David Bowie (about a festival in South London)
- "Men About Town" by Noël Coward ("As we stroll down Piccadilly in the bright morning air")
- "The Menace" by Lowkey
- "Mercy I Cry City" by The Incredible String Band (the reference to the "choky tube" make clear it is about London)
- "Meridian Council Estate (Vandalise Tourists' Property, Not Residents')" by Billy Jenkins (musician)
- "The Metro" by Berlin (about London & Paris)
- "Metroland" by Mark Knopfler
- "Metroland" by Orchestral Manoeuvres in the Dark
- "Middlesex Man" by Instant Sunshine
- "Midnight In Abbey Road" by Jim Pembroke
- "Midnight in Berkeley Square" by Pharoah Sanders
- "Midnight in Chelsea" by Jon Bon Jovi (about the Chelsea neighbourhood "I've seen a lone Sloane Ranger drive..")
- "Midnight in London" by Würzel
- "Midnight In Mayfair" by Ambrose (bandleader)
- "Mile End" by Pulp
- "Milk Bottle Symphony" by Saint Etienne (about Turnpike House tower block, Goswell Road, Islington)
- "Mill Hill Self Hate Club" by Ed Ball
- "Millers Pond Boogie" by Bob Burgos (member of Matchbox (band))
- "Millwall" by Millwall FC
- "Millwall Brick" by Doug Aldrich
- "Millwall Inner Docks" by The Recedents (featuring Mike Cooper (musician))
- "Milton at the Savoy" by The Shirts
- "Mind The Gap" by Noisettes
- "Minuetto Allegretto" by The Wombles (band)
- "Miracles In Fulham" by Robb Johnson
- "Misadventure" by Squeeze (Isle of Dogs)
- "Miss London" by The Times
- "Missing You" by Jimmy McCarthy (made popular by Christy Moore, about the Irish emigrant homeless in London)
- "Mission From Hell" by Madness (references to Number 10 Downing Street)
- "Misty Morning Albert Bridge" by The Pogues
- "Mix It Up" by Acid Fingers Simon Harris ('The Sound of Young London')
- "Modern Art" by Art Brut ("so I'm in the Tate and I'm looking at a Hockney")
- "Modern Girl" by Sheena Easton
- "Moon Over Archway" by Cath Carroll
- "Moon Over Brixton" by Bernie Worrell
- "Moon Over Romford" (from Hello Cheeky)
- "Moonlight On The Thames" (from London Town (1946 film))
- "Moonlight Over The Thames" by Bill Shepherd (arranger for the Bee Gees)
- "Moonlighting" by Leo Sayer
- "Morden" by Good Shoes
- "Mouse in a Hole" by Heavy Stereo
- "Mornington Crescent" by Belle & Sebastian
- "Mornington Crescent" by Temperance Seven
- "Morwell in London" by The Morwells
- "Mother Goose" by Jethro Tull
- "Mother London" by Steve Jansen/Richard Barbieri
- "The Mountains of Mourne" by Don McLean ft William Percy French
- "Move on Now" by Hard-Fi (References Heathrow Airport)
- "Mr Speaker (Gets the Word)" by Madness (about Speaker's Corner; "Making space from Colney Hatch Lane")
- "Much Too Much" by Les Incompétents
- "Mulberry Dawn" by Peter Sarstedt
- "Murder at the End of the Day" by Tom Robinson
- "Museum" by Donovan and Herman's Hermits ("meet me under the whale in the Natural History Museum")
- "Muswell Hill" by David Freeman
- "Muswell Hillbillies" by The Kinks
- "My Chelsea" by Phil Minton, Lol Coxhill, Noël Akchoté
- "My City" by George the Poet
- "My Favourite Wet Wednesday Afternoon" by The Siddeleys
- "My Gal from London Town" by Fred Godfrey and Billy Williams
- "My Kitten Went to London" by Kid 606
- "My London" by Chuck Stevens
- "My London Town" by Clifford Grey, Ivor Novello and Howard Talbot
- "My Object All Sublime" from The Mikado by Gilbert and Sullivan
- "My Old Man" by Ian Dury (Victoria, Heathrow etc.)
- "My Old Man's a Dustman" by Lonnie Donegan (features Cockney rhyming slang)
- "My Old Man (Said Follow the Van)" by Marie Lloyd (written by Charles Collins and Fred W Leigh)
- "The Myths And Legends Of King Merton Womble And His Journey To The Centre Of The Earth" by The Wombles (band)

== N ==
- "N16" by Deirdre Cartwright
- "Nacht in Soho" by Dietmar Schönherr
- "Nan I Am London" by Wiley
- "Narcissist" by The Libertines
- "Natty Dub in a London" by U Brown
- "Near the Moon" by Animals That Swim (describes a location in the vicinity of Stoke Newington)
- "Neasden" by Willie Rushton
- "Neckinger" by Oicho (David Harrow)
- "Negotiations in Soho Square" by The Tremeloes
- "Nelson's Column" by Eddie Thompson
- "Nelson's Column" by Haydn Wood (from London Landmarks Suite)
- "Nevermore" by U.K. (Soho)
- "Never See London Again" by Lincoln
- "New Amsterdam" by Elvis Costello (Rotherhithe)
- "New Crass Massahkah" by Linton Kwesi Johnson
- "New Cross" by Part Chimp
- "New Cross 13" by The Blackstones
- "New Face in N16" by The Apostles
- "New Kent Road" by Dennis Bovell
- "Theme From New Scotland Yard" by Norrie Paramor
- "New Thing From London Town" by Sharpe and Numan
- "New Tunbridge Wells at Islington" by John Lockman
- "New York, London, Amsterdam" by The Captain & Steve Thomas
- "(New York London Paris) Spleen" by Art of Noise
- "The Newgate Wind" by The Bevis Frond
- "Newgate's Knocker" by Jools Holland
- "Newington" (hymn tune by William Maclagan)
- "Newington Gardens" by Lyn Dobson
- "Newman Street" by Axis Point
- "Next Plane to London" by The Rose Garden
- "Next Stop London" by Union
- "Nice Man Jack (Kensington Gardens/Mitre Square/Harley Street)" by John Miles
- "Nice One Bruvva" by Paul F & Mr T (hard trance tune featuring the line "you big cockney space case")
- "Night Bus To Dalston" by Bad Manners
- "Night Falls on London" by The Waterboys
- "Night Flight To London" by Sol Raye
- "The Night I Appeared as Macbeth" by William Hargreaves ("They made me a present of Mornington Crescent..")
- "Night in Acton (After Dark in W3)" by The Beatmasters
- "Nightingale Lane" by Raye
- "Night Terror" by Laura Marling ("I woke up on a bench on Shepherds Bush Green")
- "A Nightingale Sang in Berkeley Square" by Vera Lynn (by Eric Maschwitz and Manning Sherwin)
- "Nine out of Ten" by Caetano Veloso ("Walk down Portobello Road...")
- "Nite Train To London" by Moon Martin
- "No More" by Noël Coward ("No more binges at the Piccadilly; Cafe Royal and Ritz..")
- "No Place Like London" by Stephen Sondheim
- "No Place Like London" by Todd Edwards
- "No Respect" by Bad Manners (Soho)
- "No Town Hall (Southwark)" by Crisis
- "No War in Russell Square" by Software (project featuring Patrick Leonard)
- "No.1 with a Bullet" by Alan Moore and Tim Perkins (in The Highbury Working)
- "No. 10 Downing Street" by The Troggs
- "Nobody Compares" by One Direction ("You're so London, your own style...") from Take Me Home 2012
- "Non-Stop London" by Johnny Dankworth
- "North Circular" by Real Lies
- "North Circular Dub" by King Tubby
- "North End Road" by Peter Bardens
- "North Kensington" by The Lilac Time
- "North London" by Wiley
- "North London Boy" by Incognito
- "North London Thing (Carry the Swing)" by Prince Hammer
- "North London Trash" by Razorlight
- "North Thames Gas Board" by The End
- "North West Three" by Fatboy Slim
- "Northcote Arms" by Mungo Jerry
- "Northern Line" by Jamie T
- "Northern Line" by Yeti
- "Northern Line, Black Heart" by Tyla
- "Northsides" by Chester P
- "Norwegian Wood (This Bird Has Flown)" by The Beatles
- "Not Dark Yet" by Bob Dylan ("Well I been to London, and I been to gay Paree")
- "Nothing Has Been Proved" by Dusty Springfield (written by Pet Shop Boys)
- "Notting Hill" by Trevor Jones
- "Notting Hill" by Wild Willy Barrett
- "Notting Hill Blues" by Aztec Camera
- "Notting Hill Eviction Blues" by Ram John Holder
- "Notting Hill Gate" by the Reckless Sleepers (featured Jules Shear)
- "The Notting Hill Two-Step" by Acoustic Alchemy
- "Now You're Just Being Ridiculous" by Television Personalities (Greenwich Park)
- "Number One Bus" by Nuru Kane (describes Bermondsey and Islington and bus routes between)
- "Number One: Protection" by Tom Robinson Band
- "Nunhead" by Happy Accidents
- "NW3" by The Apostles
- "NW3" by The Pogues
- "NW5" by Madness (The Liberty of Norton Folgate album)
- "NW6" by Dave Shepherd Quintet (jazz)
- "NW8" by Bernie Marsden
- "NW10" by JC Carroll
- "The Nymph's Dance – The Second of Grays Inn" by Mannheim Steamroller

== O ==
- "Oh! 'Ampstead" by Albert Chevalier and John Crook ("The day you spent at 'Ampstead 'Eath you never will forget")
- "Oh Baby Won't Come Back Home To Croydon Where Everyone Beedle's And Bo's" by Brian Auger
- "Oh Eversholt" by Ciccone (named for Eversholt Street in Camden)
- "Oh, if you come to Brixton there are lots of sights to see" from The Girl From Utah
- "Oh, London Girls Are All So Haughty, Proud, and Chilly" from A Country Girl
- "Oh, London is Really a Wonderful Town..." by Adrian Ross and Percy Greenbank (from the musical comedy Our Miss Gibbs)
- "Oh! Mr Porter" by George Le Brunn
- "Oi! Oi! Oi!" by Cockney Rejects
- "Old Compton Street" by Don Black (from the musical 'Budgie')out
- "Old Compton Street Blues" by Al Stewart
- "Old Jewish East End Of London Dub" by Jah Wobble
- "The Old Main Drag" by The Pogues
- "Old Kent Road" by Plainsong
- "Old Kent Road" by The Upsetters
- "Old Lady of Stokey" by Ranking Dread
- "Old London Cries" from Sailing Along
- "Old London Town" by Benny Martin
- "Old River Thames" by Automatics
- "Old Siam Sir" by Paul McCartney
- "Old Smokey" by Linda Lewis
- "Old Soho" by Murray Head
- "Old St. Boogie" by Eat
- "The Old Welsh Harp" by Florrie Forde (about the Old Welsh Harp Tavern that stood in Hendon)
- "Olympia" by Lush
- "On A Mission" by The Rakes
- "On And On " by Aswad featuring Sweetie Irie
- "On (Catford) Broadway" by Billy Jenkins
- "On Frith Street" by Mo Foster
- "On Lavender Hill" by The Real Tuesday Weld
- "On London Bridge" by Jo Stafford
- "On Mother Kelly's Doorstep" by George Alex Stevens ("Paradise Row" is in Bethnal Green)
- "On The GPO Tower" by Don Spencer
- "On the Kings Road" by The Young Idea (featuring Tony Cox (record producer))
- "On The Steps of Old St Pauls" by Billy Cotton
- "Once Upon A Long Ago" by Paul McCartney
- "One Better Day" by Madness
- "One Day in London" by Leslie Bricusse
- "One Drop" by P.I.L.
- "One For John Gee" by Jethro Tull (John Gee being manager of London's Marquee Club.)
- "One For The Burglar" by D.S. Building Contractors (who included half of Orbital)
- "One Hundred Punks" by Generation X (Wardour Street, Soho)
- "One Man Band" by Leo Sayer ("Everyone knows you in Ladbroke Grove")
- "One Two Three (The Ballad of Notting Hill Gate)" by Heron
- "The Only Cool Girl in Ladbroke Grove" by The Manges
- "The Only Living Boy in New Cross" by Carter the Unstoppable Sex Machine
- "Open Piccadilly" by Lol Coxhill
- "Operation Trident" by Mad Professor
- "Òran na Cloiche", Scottish Gaelic folk song (commemorates the removal of the Stone of Scone from Westminster Abbey)
- "An Ordinary Copper" by Jeff Darnell and Jack Warner
- "Original London Style" by London Posse
- "Orion" by Jethro Tull ("darkest Chelsea")
- "Ossie's Dream (Spurs Are on Their Way To Wembley)" by Tottenham Hotspur FC With Chas & Dave
- "Our Man in London" by CCS
- "Outer Space/Carry On" by 5 Seconds of Summer
- "Outskirts of London" by Melanie Harrold & Olly Blanchflower
- "Over London Skies" by The Orchestra
- "Over The Flats" by T. Rex
- "Oxford Street" by Everything But The Girl
- "Oxford Street" by The Monks
- "Oxford St, W1" by Television Personalities
- "Oxford Street March" by Eric Coates

== P ==
- "P.25 London" by The Black Crowes
- "Paddington" by Blancmange
- "Paddington Bear" by Bernard Cribbins
- "Paddington Green" by Ray Burton
- "Paid in Full" by Eric B. & Rakim
- "Painter Man" by The Creation
- "Painting and Kissing" by Hefner (Holloway Road)
- "Palewell Park" by Bruford
- "Pall Mall Blues" by Joe Pass, Boško Petrović, Niels-Henning Ørsted Pedersen
- "Paris" by The 1975
- "Parker – Well Done!" by Barry Gray Orchestra
- "Parkeskine" by Saint Etienne
- "Parliament Hill" by Magna Carta
- "Parliament Hill" by Saint Etienne
- "Parliament Hill Fields" by Captain Sensible
- "Parliament Hill Fields" by Stephen Duffy & the Lilac Time
- "Part Time Punks" by Television Personalities
- "Parties in Chelsea" by Television Personalities
- "Party in Paris" by UK Subs ("meanwhile back in London", etc.)
- "Passing Through" by Fad Gadget
- "Pass Me the Rizla" by London Posse (Wood Green)
- "Passport To Pimlico" by Johnny Mandel
- "Paternosta Row" by The Twilights
- "Peace of Mind" by Curved Air (Isle of Dogs)
- "Pearly King And Queen" by Portion Control
- "Pearly Queen" by Dave Mason
- "Peckham Royalty" by Robin Jones Latin Jazz Sextet (featuring Snowboy)
- "Pembridge Court" by Big Jay McNeely
- "Pentonville" by Babyshambles
- "Pentonville" by Kenny Clarke/Francy Boland Big Band
- "Pentonville Blues" by Glide & Swerve featuring Boy George
- "Peter the Painter" by Ian Dury
- "Petticoat Lane" by Stanley Holloway
- "Petticoat Lane (On A Saturday Ain't So Nice)" by Lionel Bart
- "Petticoat Lane Rag" by Euday L. Bowman
- "Picadilly Lily" by Herbert Kretzmer (from the musical film Can Heironymus Merkin Ever Forget Mercy Humppe and Find True Happiness?)
- "Piccadilly" by Adam Ant
- "Piccadilly" by Ambrose
- "Piccadilly" by Arnold Steck
- "Piccadilly" by Crazy Otto
- "Piccadilly" by David Rose and his Orchestra
- "Piccadilly" by Fats Waller (from The London Suite)
- "Piccadilly" by Fritz Schulz-Reichel
- "Piccadilly" by Hetty King
- "Piccadilly" by Julie Andrews
- "Piccadilly" by Squeeze
- "Piccadilly" by Tir Na Nog
- "Piccadilly" by Vivian Ellis
- "Piccadilly 2AM" by Ray Martin
- "Piccadilly Baby" by Blue Diamonds
- "Piccadilly Circus" by Adamski's Thing
- "Piccadilly Circus" by Bill Ramsey
- "Piccadilly Circus" by Frank Boeijen (in Dutch)
- "Piccadilly Circus" by King Tubby
- "Piccadilly Circus" by Ray Anthony
- "Piccadilly Circus" by Stiff Little Fingers
- "Piccadilly Circus" by Pernilla Wahlgren
- "Piccadilly Circus Blues" by Ram John Holder
- "Piccadilly Circus Dub" by Sir Coxson Sound Lloyd Coxsone
- "Piccadilly Folks" by Lord Kitchener
- "Piccadilly Hop" by The Hippy Boys
- "Piccadilly in the Rain (I'll Be There)" by Scarlet
- "Piccadilly Jumps" by Johnny Keating
- "Piccadilly Lady" by David Garrick (singer)
- "Piccadilly Lily" by David Liebman
- "Piccadilly Line" by Jim Dale
- "Piccadilly Line" by Liverpool Five
- "Piccadilly Night Ride" by Alan Hawkshaw
- "Piccadilly Palare" by Morrissey (also references Manchester)
- "Piccadilly Panic" by Ralph Sharon
- "Piccadilly Pick Up" by Bill Shepherd (arranger for the Bee Gees)
- "Piccadilly Picnic" by David A. Stewart
- "Piccadilly Rag" by Joe 'Fingers' Carr
- "Piccadilly Rock" by Bill Haley & His Comets
- "Piccadilly Run" by Downliners Sect
- "Piccadilly Sidetracks" by The Enemy
- "Piccadilly Sweet" by Ekseption
- "The Piccadilly Trail" by The Style Council
- "The Piccadilly Trot" by George Arthurs and Worton Davis (sung by Marie Lloyd)
- "Piccadilly Walk" by Johnny Pearson
- "Piccalilli Dilly" by Bill Finnegan
- "Pick-A-Dilly" by Bill Perkins
- "Pigeon Song" by Patrick Wolf
- "Pigeons" by Genesis
- "Pimlico" by David Devant & His Spirit Wife
- "Pinball" by Brian Protheroe
- "Pinball Wizard" by The Who
- "Pissed Up in SE1" by Aphex Twin
- "Pizzicato Piccadilly" by Betty Roe
- "Places" by Fountains of Wayne
- "Plaistow Patricia" by Ian Dury
- "Plaistow Flex Out" by Squarepusher
- "Planet Hackney" by Overlord X
- "Plastic Surgery" by Adam and the Ants ("gonna take you down to Harley Street")
- "Platform End" by Manfred Mann's Earth Band
- "Play with Fire" by The Rolling Stones (St Johns Wood, Stepney, Knightsbridge)
- "The Pleasures of Spring Gardens, Vauxhall" by William Boyce
- "The Ploughboy And The Cockney" by Tim Hart & Maddy Prior
- "A Poem on the Underground Wall" by Simon and Garfunkel
- "Police Car" by Cockney Rejects ("I got nicked up West Ham!")
- "Police Officer" by Smiley Culture (East London, cockneys, Victoria)
- "The Pond" by Phil Daniels + the Cross
- "Ponders End Allotments Club" by Chas & Dave
- "Pool of London" by Douglas Gamley
- "Pop Go The Workers (Pt 2)" by Barron Knights
- "Pop Goes the Weasel" – composer unknown ("Up and down the City Road, in and out the Eagle.")
- "Port London Early" by Robin Williamson
- "Portland Place" by Tommy Whittle
- "Portobello" by Lords of the New Church
- "Portobello Belle" by Dire Straits
- "Portobello Cafe" by Ballistic Brothers
- "Portobello Man" by The Bevis Frond
- "Portobello Market" by Syd Dale
- "Portobello Road" by Cat Stevens
- "Portobello Road" by Billy Nicholls
- "Portobello Road" by Sherman Brothers (from Bedknobs and Broomsticks)
- "Portobello Road" by Clement "Coxsone" Dodd
- "Portobello Shuffle" by Pink Fairies
- "Posin' At The Roundhouse" by Television Personalities
- "Possibly Parsons Green" by Fairport Convention
- "Postcard From London" by Ray Davies
- "Powder Blue" by Madness
- "Power in the Darkness" by Tom Robinson Band (2004 Version)
- "Powis Square" by Ry Cooder
- "Prelude – Blues SW19" by Mo Foster
- "The Prettiest Star" by David Bowie (Gloucester Road)
- "Pretty Little Villa Down at Barking" by Gus Elen
- "Pretty Polly Perkins of Paddington Green" by Harry Clifton
- "Primitive London" by Basil Kirchin
- "Primrose 0822" by The Times
- "Primrose Hill" by Beverley Martyn
- "Primrose Hill" by James McCartney (featuring Sean Lennon)
- "Primrose Hill" by Kathe Green
- "Primrose Hill" by Loudon Wainwright III
- "Primrose Hill" by Madness
- "Primrose Hill" by Peggy Seeger
- "Primrose Hill" by Ray Russell
- "Primrose Hill"[I] by Saint Etienne
- "Primrose Hill" by Underworld And Gabriel Yared
- "Primrose Hill (Theme For Jake)" by Rock Workshop (featuring Alex Harvey)
- "Prince Igor" by The Rapsody featuring Warren G
- "A Prince in a Pauper's Grave" by Carter The Unstoppable Sex Machine (Elephant and Castle)
- "Princelet Street" by Catherine Howe
- "Probably A Robbery" by Renegade Soundwave (Lloyd's, Flying Squad)
- "The Procession of Popular Capitalism" by McCarthy (the Strand, Whitehall)
- "Products" by Sway ft. El Rae
- "Professor X" by Dave
- "Proud Thames" by Louis Bellson
- "Pudding Mill Lane" by Saint Etienne (a street and DLR station in Stratford)
- "Pulled Along by Love" by The Mutton Birds (trains on the Northern line)
- "Puss in Boots" by Adam Ant ("I've been to London, and now I'm queen..")
- "Pussy Willow" by Jethro Tull ("in old Mayfair")
- "Put A Bolt in the Door" by Gallon Drunk
- "Putney" by Jah Wobble
- "Puttin' on The Ritz" by Irving Berlin

== Q ==
- "Queen Mary's Garden" by Haydn Wood
- "Queensbury Station" by The Magoo Brothers
- "Queue At Drury Lane" from Kean (musical)

== R ==
- "Railway Hotel" by Mike Batt
- "Rain Fall Down" by The Rolling Stones
- "Raining in London" by The Peddlers
- "A Rainy Day in London" by Paris
- "Rainy Day in London" by Boulevard
- "Rainy Day in London" by The Peddlers
- "Rainy Night in Kilburn" by Ducks Deluxe
- "Rainy Night in London" by Ranking Dread
- "Rainy Night in Soho" by The Pogues
- "A Ramble in St James's Park" by Michael Nyman
- "Rat City" by Art Attacks
- "Ratcliffe Highway" by Fairport Convention; Marc Almond
- "Ravensbourne" by Oicho (David Harrow)
- "Rayner's Lane" by Real People
- "Real Estate" by Blak Twang (SE8, Tanner's Hill, Stockwell Park Estate, Stonebridge, Broadwater Farm, Baskerville, New Cross)
- "Reachin'" by Alabama 3
- "Reasons To Be Cheerful Part 3" by Ian Dury
- "Red Bus Rover" by Sidi Bou Said
- "Red For Piccadilly" by Humphrey Lyttelton and his Band
- "Red London" by Sham 69
- "Red Skies Over Wembley" by The Decorators; Serious Drinking
- "The Red Weed" from Jeff Wayne's Musical Version of The War of the Worlds
- "Regent Square" by Henry Smart
- "Regent Street Incident" by String Driven Thing
- "Regent's Park" by Connie Francis
- "Regent's Park in Blue" by Dan Melchior
- "Reggae Fi Peach" by Linton Kwesi Johnson
- "Reggae in London City" by The Pioneers
- "Reggie Song" by P.I.L. (Finsbury Park, Seven Sisters)
- "Rehoused in Hounslow" by Robb Johnson
- "Remember You're A Womble" by The Wombles
- "Remembering Petticoat Lane" by John Williams (an instrumental from the Jurassic Park OST)
- "Remote Control" by The Clash
- "Rene" by Small Faces
- "Rendezvous 6:02" by U.K.
- "Respect Me" by Dizzee Rascal (reference to "Holly Street" in E8)
- "The Resurrectionist" by Pet Shop Boys
- "Retreat" by The Rakes
- "Return To Tooting Broadway" by Dick Morrissey & Jim Mullen
- "Return to the London Flat" by Erich Wolfgang Korngold
- "Rhyme" by William Walton
- "Rich Girl" by Gwen Stefani ft Eve ("Please book me first class to my fancy house in London Town")
- "Rich Ah Gettin Richer" by Rebel MC (references Tottenham 3, London massive etc.)
- "Richmond" by The Faces
- "Richmond" by Shelagh McDonald
- "Richmond Bridge" by Piero Piccioni
- "Richmond Rhythm & Blues" by Downliners Sect
- "Riddle in London Town" by State Radio
- "The Right Place For Meeting Is The Piccadilly Tube" by Clifford Grey and Nat Ayer
- "The Right Side Of Bond Street" from The Bing Boys Are Here
- "Right Tallk" by Franz Ferdinand
- "Rigs of London" by Ian Campbell Folk Group (traditional folk song)
- "Riot in a Notting Hill" by The Pioneers
- "Riot In Brixton" by Kwesi
- "Riot in Hyde Park" by Lower Class Brats
- "Riots In Brixton" by English Friday (an alias of Todd Terry)
- "Riots Over London" by 400 Blows
- "Rising Above Bedlam" by Jah Wobble's Invaders of the Heart
- "River Lea" by Adele
- "The Road To Hell" by Chris Rea (about the M25 motorway around London)
- "Road To Plaistow" (from Hello Cheeky)
- "Roadblock" by Stock Aitken Waterman
- "Roaring at the Savoy" by Colin Towns Mask Orchestra
- "Rock 'n' Roll Lies" by Razorlight
- "Rock Your Body Rock" by Ferry Corsten
- "Rockin' At The 2 I's" by Wee Willie Harris
- "Rockin' At The Ritz" by Ray Campi
- "Rockin' At The Roundhouse" by Bert Weedon
- "Rolling Around Piccadilly" by George Formby
- "Romford Bypass" by Alexei Sayle
- "Romford Girls" by Riff Raff
- "Romford Rap" by Chas & Dave feat The Matchroom Mob
- "A Room in Bloomsbury" by Sandy Wilson
- "Rose A London" by Arthur Louis
- "Rose Ann of Charing Cross" by Frank Sinatra
- "Rosemary McLaren of the Strand" by Richard Digance
- "Rossiter Road" by Ahmad Jamal
- "Rossmore Road (NW1)" by Barry Andrews
- "Rotten Row" by Royal Philharmonic Orchestra
- "Rotten Row Boogie" by Jools Holland
- "Round About Regent Street" by Jay Wilbur
- "Round Here" by George Michael
- "Round the Marble Arch" by Ralph Butler and Noel Gay
- "Rough in Hackney" by Overlord X
- "The Rover" by Led Zeppelin ("I've been to London...") 1975
- "Rowbottom Square" by Barry Mason
- "Roxy Girl" by The Radiators from Space
- "Rudie Can't Fail" by The Clash; also The Tuts ("On the route of the 19 bus.")
- "Rumpole of the Bailey" by Joseph Horovitz
- "Runaways" by Shut Up And Dance
- "The Rust on the Screws of the Churchill Theatre" by Billy Jenkins

== S ==
- "Saddle Up 1990" by David Christie featuring MC De
- "Saddlers Wells" by Haydn Wood
- "Sad Mona Lisa" by Television Personalities
- "Sage of Sydney Street" by Aynsley Dunbar Retaliation
- "St. Andrew's By The Wardrobe" by Jools Holland
- "St. Francis Amongst the Mortals" by McCarthy ("..arrived in London and lived a lamb-like life..")
- "St. James's Park" by Harry Leon and Tommie Connor, recorded by several artists including Leslie Holmes
- "St. James Park in Spring" by Haydn Wood
- "St. James Walk" by The Clientele
- "St. John's Wood Affair" by Nirvana (British band)
- "St. Martin's In The Fields" by Jools Holland
- "St. Martin's-In-The-Fields" by The Rain
- "St. Mary-Le-Bow" by Jah Wobble
- "St. Pancras" by Quintessence
- "St. Pancras" by Underworld And Gabriel Yared
- "St. Paul's" by Blancmange
- "St. Paul's" by Douglas Gamley
- "St. Paul's Beneath a Sinking Sky" by The Clientele
- "St. Paul's Suite" by Gustav Holst
- "St. Paul's Wharf" by John Fox (composer, arranger, conductor)
- "Sal and Methuselam" by F. C. Sansom (probably 1866, sung by William H. Lingard)
- "Sale of the Century" by Sleeper
- "Salt Box Hill" by Bob Burgos (member of Matchbox)
- "Salvador Dalí's Garden Party" by Television Personalities (Kensington Market)
- "Sam" by Suede (Lancaster Road)
- "Sam's Town" by The Killers
- "Santa Ain't Commin Down to Brixton Town" by Jackie Robinson
- "Satellite" by Sex Pistols
- "Saturday Gigs" by Mott the Hoople (Chelsea, Croydon, Roundhouse [Camden], etc)
- "Saturday in the Kings Road" by Harry Robertson (musician) And His Orchestra
- "Saturday Morning In Angel Lane" by Ewan MacColl
- "Saturday Night Beneath the Plastic Palm Trees" by The Leyton Buzzards ("Found my Mecca near Tottenham Hale station, I discovered heaven in the Seven Sisters Road" and also "Crews from Balham and Golders Green...")
- "Saturday Night in Camden Town" by International Observer
- "Saturday Night Facts of Life" by Comet Gain, The Cribs
- "Saturday Nite" by Earth, Wind & Fire
- "Save the World, Get the Girl" by The King Blues
- "Saville Row" by Skeewiff
- "Say A Little Prayer" by Bomb The Bass
- "Scandal in Brixton Market" by Girlie & Laurel Aitken
- "Scarlet Begonias" by Grateful Dead ("As I was walking 'round Grosvenor Square...")
- "Schooltime Chronicle" by Smiley Culture (Tulse Hill, Stockwell, Kennington)
- "Scotland Yard" by Garry & The Gonads
- "Scotland Yard" by Phillip Boa
- "Screwface Capital" by Dave (Streatham)
- "SE12" by The Business
- "SE15" by Freq Nasty
- "SE16" by God Colony ft. Flohio
- "Seaside Shuffle" by Terry Dactyl and the Dinosaurs
- "Second Hand" by Wilfrid Brambell (1962: namechecks London locations and sung as if by Steptoe senior)
- "See My Friends" by The Kinks ("They'll cross the river..." Thames)
- "Seeing Through London" by Joseph Cotton And The Lord Son
- "Serpentine Gallery" by Alternative TV
- "Set The Thames on Fire" by Scientist
- "Seven Kings" by Juan María Solare
- "Seven Dials" by Jah Wobble & Ollie Marland
- "Seven Dials" by Jools Holland
- "Seven Dials" by Madness
- "Seven Sisters Dub" by King Tubby
- "Seven Sisters Road" by Dan Reed Network
- "Seven Sisters to Silverlake" by Comet Gain
- "Sex Kick (Ciao Portobello)" by Transvision Vamp
- "The Sewers of the Strand" by Spike Milligan
- "Shad Thames" by Saint Etienne
- "Shadwell Stair" by Betty Roe
- "Shake Buckingham Palace Down" by Dennis Bovell
- "Shakespeare Road" by The Mahones
- "Shakin' Up (Downing Street)" by Bad Manners
- "She Ain't Worth It" by Glenn Medeiros ft Bobby Brown (Boilerhouse mix)
- "She Was Poor But She Was Honest" by R.P. Weston and Bert Lee ("Then she ran away to London to hide her grief and shame")
- "She Wears Red Feathers" by Guy Mitchell
- "Sheila" by Jamie T
- "Shepherd's Bush" by Elizabeth Barraclough
- "Shepherds Bush Cowboy" by Third World War
- "Shepherds Bush in Dub" by King Tubby Meets Roots Radics
- "She's A Woman" by Scritti Politti & Shabba Ranks
- "Shock on the Tube" by 10cc
- "Shopping In Kensington" (from Follow That Girl)
- "Shouting for the Gunners" by Arsenal FC and Tippa Irie
- "(Si Si) Je Suis Un Rock Star" by Bill Wyman (Trafalgar Square, Battersea)
- "Sidney Street" by Chris Difford
- "Sid's Song" by Inner City Unit ("In London town where I was born")
- "Sights and Sounds of London Town" by Richard Thompson
- "Sightsee M.C.!" by Big Audio Dynamite
- "Signs" by Snoop Dogg ft Justin Timberlake
- "Sing A Song of London" by Stanley Holloway
- "Singers Hampstead Home" by Microdisney
- "Sir Keith at Lambeth" by Mount Vernon Arts Lab
- "Sirens of Acre Lane" by Genaside II (Brixton)
- "Silvertown" by Cockney Rejects
- "Silvertown Blues" by Mark Knopfler
- "Simply Unstoppable" by Tinie Tempah
- "Sister Rosetta" by Alabama 3 (Brixton)
- "Sitting in London City" by Mel Collins
- "Six Bells Stampede" by Wally Fawkes And The Troglodytes (The Six Bells was a jazz venue in London)
- "Skeleton Horse" by Alan Moore and Tim Perkins (in The Highbury Working)
- "Sketches From The National Gallery" by Louis Bellson
- "Skyline – West One" by Syd Dale
- "Skylon" by 808 State
- "Slam" by Humanoid (Brian Dougans)
- "Slim Slow Slider," by Van Morrison ("Saw you walking down by Ladbroke Grove..")
- "Sleepless in London" by Neon Jungle
- "Sloane Square" by Simon Fisher Turner
- "Sloane Street Ladies" by Arthur Macrae and Richard Addinsell
- "Slow Down at the Castle" by Saint Etienne
- "Small Town Girl" by Good Shoes (References Raynes Park High School)
- "Smashing Time" by Television Personalities
- "The Smile" by David Essex
- "Smithers-Jones" by The Jam (Waterloo Line)
- "Snooker Loopy" by Chas & Dave
- "Snowbound On The South Bank" by Saint Etienne
- "Snowed In At Wheeler Street" by Kate Bush
- "So Long, London" by Taylor Swift
- "So Rotton" by Blak Twang (London – West, East, South, North and NW)
- "So So" by Gary Go
- "So you'd better stay with me at Mocha, and be number 5 0 3. You'll find me the wittiest joker from Greenwich to the Caspian Sea..." by Alfred Cellier and Albert Jarret
- "Soho" by Bay City Rollers
- "Soho" by Bert Jansch and John Renbourn
- "Soho" by Brand X
- "Soho" by Fats Waller (from The London Suite)
- "Soho" by The Hangovers
- "Soho" by Incognito
- "Soho" by Ian Whitcomb
- "Soho" by Jools Holland
- "Soho" by L.A. Guns
- "Soho" by Light of the World
- "Soho" by Steve Smith and Vital Information
- "Soho" by Tanja Berg (singer has article on German wiki)
- "Soho" by UK Subs
- "Soho A Go Go" by The Members
- "Soho All Over Again" by Robb Johnson
- "Soho Alley" by The Fixx
- "Soho Blues" by Acker Bilk
- "Soho Blues" by Reg Owen
- "Soho Cab Ride" by Ballistic Brothers
- "Soho Code" by Deep Blue (musician)
- "Soho Disco" by Groove Armada
- "Soho Dreams" by Secret Affair
- "Soho Fair" by Bert Weedon
- "Soho Forenoons" by John Ireland (from Three London Pieces)
- "Soho Girls" by Pork Dukes
- "Soho Heart" by Robb Johnson
- "Soho Jack" by Paul Brett
- "Soho Mojo" by Spyro Gyra
- "Soho (Needless to say)" by Al Stewart
- "Soho Saturday Night Shuffle" by Bill Shepherd (arranger for the Bee Gees)
- "Soho Solitaire" by Peter Miller
- "Soho Square" by Kirsty MacColl
- "Soho Square" by Lindisfarne
- "Soho St Ives Tangier" by The Focus Group
- "Soho Stripper" by Dick Hyman
- "Soho Strut" by Brand New Heavies
- "Soho Strut" by Secret Affair
- "Soho Studio" by the People Band (featuring Terry Day amongst others)
- "Solitary Confinement" by The Members
- "Solo in Soho" by Phil Lynott
- "Someone in London" by Godsmack
- "Someone Saved My Life Tonight" by Elton John ("East End nights")
- "Somers Town" by Jasmine Minks
- "Somerstown" by The Parkinsons
- "Somewhere In London" by Steeleye Span
- "Son Of 'There's No Place Like Homerton'" by Hatfield and the North
- "Song for Clay (Disappear Here)" by Bloc Party
- "Song for Ruth Ellis" by Adam and the Ants ("Violence in Hampstead")
- "Song for South Kensington" by Analogy
- "Songs And Cries of London Town" by Bob Chilcott
- "Sonny's Lettah" by Linton Kwesi Johnson
- "Sorted for E's and Wizz" by Pulp
- "Sound Bwoy Burial" by Gant (an alias of 187 Lockdown)
- "Sound of Swinging London" by Glen Matlock and The Philistines
- "Sound of the Suburbs" by The Members
- "Soundlife London" by The Clarke & Ware Experiment (Vince Clarke and Martyn Ware)
- "Sounds From the Street" by The Jam
- "Sounds of London" by Rick & Pam Maskell
- "South Bank" by Colin Towns Mask Quintet
- "South Circular Dub" by King Tubby
- "South East London Skank" by Basque Dub Foundation
- "South London Boroughs" by Burial
- "South London Dub Symphony" by Jah Wobble
- "South London Forever" by Florence and the Machine
- "South London Safari" by Shingai Shoniwa
- "South of the River" by Mica Paris
- "South Side of the River" by Gary Holton
- "Southbank Song" by Dan Melchior
- "Southern Belles in London Sing" by The Faint
- "Southside Tenements" by David Knopfler
- "Souvenir of London" by Procol Harum
- "Space Angel Station" by Drum Club
- "Spanish Place" by Jah Wobble & Bill Sharpe
- "Speakeasy" by Pat Travers
- "Speakeasy" by The Who (about the Speakeasy Club in 1960s/1970s London)
- "Speaker's Corner" by Haven
- "Speakers Corner" by Jools Holland
- "Speakers Corner" by Parchment
- "Spencer Road Rock" by Elroy Bailey (a member of Black Slate)
- "SPG" by Red Alert
- "Spirit" by Razorlight
- "The Spirit of Cable Street" by Cornelius Cardew
- "Spirits By The Thames" by Jah Wobble
- "Spitalfields" by Red Snapper
- "Sports Line London" by London Brass
- "Springtime in Piccadilly Circus" by Johnny Scott
- "Springtime in Whitechapel" by Carol Grimes
- "Stagger" by Underworld
- "Stairway To Croydon" by Dan Melchior
- "Stand Up Tall" by Dizzee Rascal
- "Stanley (Does It All)" by Scatman Crothers
- "Stanwell" by Action Pact!
- "Starlight Melody (Waterloo Bridge)" by Nini Rosso
- "Stardom in Acton" by Pete Townshend
- "A State Procession (Buckingham Palace)" by Albert Ketelbey
- "Statuesque" by Sleeper
- "Stavordale Road, N5" by The Nips (A street in Highbury)
- "Stay Free" by The Clash (Brixton [Prison], Crown (& Sceptre) [Streatham Hill])
- "Step It Down Shepherd's Bush" by Ranking Joe
- "Step To Me" (Real Club Mix) by Mantronix
- "Stick To London Town" by Ella Shields
- "Sticks Vs. Smoke" by Dan Melchior (Broke Revue)
- "The Stoke Newington 8" by The Apostles
- "Stompin' At Decca" by Django Reinhardt
- "Stone Thames" by Big Audio Dynamite
- "Stoned on Denmark Street" by New Jersey Kings (an alias of the James Taylor Quartet)
- "Stop This Crazy Thing" by Coldcut
- "Straight To Stereo (Tokyo-London)" by Dr Calculus (featured Stephen Duffy)
- "Strange Tale of Madame Occhahontas and the Westminister Dreadlocks" by David Rudder
- "Strange Town" by The Jam
- "Streatham" by Dave
- "Street Fighting Man" by The Rolling Stones
- "The Streets of Ladbroke Grove" by Delroy Washington
- "Streets of London" by B.B. Seaton
- "Streets of London" by Clover
- "Streets of London" by Ralph McTell
- "Streets Of San Fran Brixton" by Genaside II
- "Streets of Whitechapel" by JC Carroll
- "Street Tuff" by Rebel MC
- "Strip Show" by Doll By Doll
- "Strolling Down The Strand" by Fred Godfrey and Leslie Sarony
- "Strolling in Hyde Park" by Byron Lee and the Dragonaires
- "Strummin'" by Chas & Dave (Brixton, Barnet)
- "Struttin' In The Strand" by Harry Roy and his Mayfair Hotel Orchestra
- "Studio 51" by Downliners Sect
- "Success" by Sigue Sigue Sputnik (Savile Row etc.)
- "Sugarhouse Lane" by Saint Etienne
- "Sugar & Spice" by Madness ("We bought a flat in Golders Green")
- "Suicide on Downing Street" by Tim Finn
- "Suite in C (Including Turnham Green, Here I Am And Others)" by McDonald & Giles
- "Sultans of Swing" by Dire Straits
- "Sunday" by Bloc Party
- "Sunday Street" by Squeeze
- "Sunny Goodge Street" by Donovan
- "Sunday Morning Camden Town" by Louis Philippe
- "Sunday Morning in Petticoat Lane" by Maria Dallas
- "Sunny South Kensington" by Donovan
- "Sunny Street, W14" by Sutherland Brothers Band
- "Sunset Boulevard" by Kim Fowley
- "Supper at the Savoy" by Raymond Scott
- "Supreme" by Robbie Williams ("All the lonely hearts in London caught a plane and flew away")
- "Surfin' SW12" by The Monochrome Set
- "Susan's Soho Parties" by Bill Pritchard
- "Suspicious Eyes" by The Rakes
- "Suzy" by Benny Hill ("Now I wandered down into Soho")
- "Svata Parlan I London (Black Pearl in London)" by Thomas Di Leva
- "SW2" by DJ Maxi Jazz
- "SW4" by Gail Ann Dorsey
- "SW5" by Mike Silver
- "The Swallows of London Town" by Autumn Defense
- "Swan Wharf" by Saint Etienne
- "Swedish Sin" by Billie the Vision and the Dancers
- "Sweet London Lady" by Lou Christie
- "Sweet Thames" by Vivian Ellis
- "Sweet Thames Flow Softly" by Ewan MacColl ft. Planxty
- "Sweet Thing" by Van Morrison
- "Swimming Over London" by King's Singers
- "Swing Big Ben" by Joe Daniels (jazz drummer) & his Hot Shots
- "Swingin' At Maida Vale" by Benny Carter
- "Swingin' Beefeater" by The Tornados
- "Swinging In The Rain" by Norman Vaughan
- "Swinging London" by Barbara Windsor
- "Swinging London" by The Cleaners from Venus
- "Swinging London" by London
- "Swinging London" by The Magnetic Fields
- "Swinging London" by The Pretenders
- "Swinging London Town" by Girls Aloud
- "Swiss Cottage Manoeuvres" by Al Stewart
- "Symphony No 2 A London Symphony"[I] by Ralph Vaughan Williams (includes "Hampstead Heath on a August Bank Holiday Sunday" and "Bloomsbury Square on a November Afternoon")
- "Symphony No 104 in D Major (London)" by Joseph Haydn

== T ==
- "Take It" by Flowered Up
- "Take Me Back to Dear Old Blighty" by Florrie Forde
- "Take Me Back To London" by Ruby
- "Take Me Down To Kensington High" by Bill Shepherd (arranger for the Bee Gees)
- "Take Me in a Taxi, Joe" by Bennett Scott
- "Taking After Dear Old Dad" by Noël Coward ("Later on I meet a pal and stroll with him along the Mall")
- "The Taking of Peckham 123" by Carter the Unstoppable Sex Machine
- "The Tale of Two Cities" by Semprini
- "Taste of Aggro" by The Barron Knights ("We're from Catford", etc.)
- "Tea at the Cafe De Paris" by Cayenne
- "The Tears Shed in London Tonight" by R.P. Weston and Bert Lee
- "Techno Fan" by The Wombats
- "Teddington Green" by John Scott (composer)
- "Tell Them You're A Londoner" by Fred Godfrey and Billy Williams
- "Tell Me When The Whistle Blows" by Elton John
- "Temple Bar" by Gazebo (musician)
- "Temple Bar" by Jools Holland
- "Thames" by Jah Wobble
- "The Thames" by Starsailor
- "Thames – A Tempo" by Betty Roe
- "Thames At High Water" by Miaow
- "The Thames Hornpipe" by Patrick Street
- "Thames Lighterman" by Alasdair Clayre
- "Thames Walk" by Don Rendell
- "Thameslick" by Amen Andrews
- "That'll Be Very Useful Later On" by Noël Coward ("Mary had them watched from Charing Cross to Golders Green")
- "That's My Impression" by Pet Shop Boys (references the Serpentine)
- "That's Nice" by Neil Christian
- "That's What I Like" by Chas & Dave
- "The Theatre" by Pet Shop Boys
- "Theatre of the Absurd" by Ian Hunter
- "There are Places on the Map that I Never want to see, such as London (on the Thames)..." by Adrian Ross and Basil Hood (from the musical play The Girls of Gottenberg)
- "There Is A Greenford Far Away (Medley)" by Johnny G
- "There's A Beat Goin' On" by Londonbeat
- "There's A Lovely Lake in London" by Tolchard Evans
- "There's A Place Called London" by Buddy Greco
- "There's No Place Like London" by Shirley Bassey
- "They Call me the Belle of Dollis Hill" from Little Jack Sheppard
- "They're Changing The Guard at Buckingham Palace" by Billy Cotton
- "This Is A London Song" by The Union
- "This Is London" by Akala
- "This Is London" by DJ Vortex & Arpa's Dream
- "This Is London" by Don McGlashan
- "This Is London" by Greedy Beat Syndicate
- "This Is London" by Tecno Rappers
- "This Is London" by The Times
- "This London Bridge" by Cilla Black
- "This World Over" by XTC
- "Thornton Heath" by Nairobi Meets Mad Professor
- "Three Juvenile Delinquents" by Noël Coward ("Once we pinched a Cadillac and drove her from the Marble Arch to Kew")
- "Three White Feathers" by Noël Coward (Ealing girl makes good)
- "Tied Up Too Tight" by Hard-Fi
- "Tiger Tiger" by Paul Quinn
- "Tighten Up, Vol. 88" by Big Audio Dynamite
- "Till the Lights of London Shine Again" by Tommie Connor and Edward Pola
- "Time for Heroes" by The Libertines
- "Time of Our Life" by Jeff Lynne's ELO
- "A Tiny Flat in Soho Square" by Cicely Courtneidge and Harold French
- "Tired of England" by Dirty Pretty Things
- "Tiswas" by Sleaford Mods
- "Titanic Reaction" by 999 ("going round on the Circle Line")
- "To Battersea with Bunches" by The Orb
- "To Cry You a Song" by Jethro Tull
- "To God; An Anthem sung in the Chappell at Whitehall" by Betty Roe
- "To Heathrow Cargo, A Parcel" by Jah Wobble
- "To London" music by Franz Lehar; lyrics by Harold Atteridge and Paul M. Potter
- "To London With You" by Al Jones
- "To The Winter" by Brett Anderson ("So I went and sat in Crystal Palace, by the plastic dinosaurs")
- "To Wimbledon With Love" by The Wombles
- "Tom Jones International" by Tom Jones
- "Tom O'Bedlam" by Steeleye Span (traditional folk ballad)
- "Tomorrow Night" by The Front Lawn
- "Tonight in Camden Town" by John Kerr
- "Too Much Brandy" by The Streets (mentions a tube train and the Dog Star pub, Brixton)
- "Toon Army – Going To Wembley" by Mungo Jerry
- "Tooting Bec" by Tim Souster
- "Tooting Bec Rape Case" by England
- "Tooting Bec Wreck" by Hanoi Rocks
- "Top of the Morning" by Noël Coward ("London is shiny and free, that is, as free as a Democracy can be")
- "Torn on the Platform" by Jack Peñate
- "Tottenham Burned" by Robb Johnson
- "Tottenham Rock" by U Brown
- "Tower Hill" by Haydn Wood (from London Landmarks Suite)
- "Tower Hill" by Jonathan Coe & Louis Philippe
- "Tower of London" by ABC
- "Tower Block Rock (W1)" by Twenty Flight Rockers
- "Tower Bridge" by Spike Milligan
- "Tower Warders, Under Orders" by Gilbert & Sullivan (from The Yeoman of the Guard)
- "Towers of London" by XTC
- "Trafalgar" by Bee Gees
- "Trafalgar Square" by Guy Bolton, Fred Thompson (writer), Douglas Furber, Martin Broones and Graham John
- "Trafalgar Square" by Jonathan Wilson
- "Trafalgar Square" by Huggy Bear
- "Trafalgar Square" by Pablo Gad
- "Trafalgar Square Dance" by Leslie Crowther
- "Traffic in Fleet Street" by Nick Heyward
- "Trailer Load of Girls" by Shabba Ranks
- "Traitors Gate" by Blitzkrieg
- "Traitors Gate" by Chelsea
- "Traitors Gate" by More
- "Trams of Old London" by Robyn Hitchcock
- "Transmetropolitan" by The Pogues
- "Transport of Delight" by Flanders and Swann
- "The Trees in Grosvenor Square" by Johnny Scott
- "Trellick Tower" by Emmy the Great
- "Tried by the Centre Court" by Michael Flanders & Donald Swann
- "Trinity Wharf" by Saint Etienne
- "Trip To London" by Stockton's Wing
- "Tropical London" by Rancid
- "Trouble on Oxford Street" by Skinny Lister
- "Trouble on the Westside" by Tony Touch featuring Slick Rick (Mitcham)
- "Truro Road" by Juan María Solare
- "T-Shirt Weather in the Manor" by Kano
- "Tube Disasters" by Flux of Pink Indians
- "Tube Train" by The Iveys
- "Tube Train Blues" by Brunning Sunflower Blues Band (featuring Bob Brunning)
- "Tulse Hill Nights" by 999
- "Turned Away" by Audio Bullys
- "Turnpike Lane" by Pete Moore (composer)
- "Twas in Hyde Park, Beside the Row" from The Emerald Isle
- "Twenty-Four Minutes from Tulse Hill" by Carter the Unstoppable Sex Machine
- "Twickenham Ferry" by Theo Marzials
- "Twilight (Uxbridge Road)" by Anthony Moore
- "Two Cockney Kids" by Leslie Bricusse (from Three Hats for Lisa)
- "Two Criminal Points of View" by McCarthy
- "Two Ol' Girls From Camden Town" by Chas & Dave
- "Twyford Down" by Galliano (band) (references the M25)
- "Tyburn" by The Pack (featuring Kirk Brandon)
- "Tyburn" by The Wall
- "Tyburn Tree" by The Men They Couldn't Hang
- "The Tyburn Tree" by Marc Almond

== U ==
- "UFO's over Leytonstone" by Squarepusher
- "'Ullo John! Gotta New Motor?" by Alexei Sayle (the Thames Barrier, Bermondsey, Peckham, Stanmore, Fulham, etc.)
- "The Um-Ber-El-La-Mender" by George Leybourne and Alfred Lee ("Standing in the Strand with cigar-lights")
- "Un Dimanche A Londres" by Edith Piaf
- "Uncommercial Road" by Jah Wobble
- "Under London Lights" by The Peddlers
- "Under New Management (parts 1&2)" by Barron Knights
- "Under The Gun" by The Killers ("Stupid on the streets of London")
- "Under The Westway" by Blur
- "Undercover Anarchist" by Silver Bullet
- "Underground Music" by Ivor Biggun ("On London Transport, I used to do my shopping")
- "The Underground Train" by Lord Kitchener
- "Underneath the Arches" by Bud Flanagan (the Arches were railway arches near Charing Cross)
- "Unemployed in Summertime" by Emiliana Torrini (Primrose Hill)
- "Unfortunately" by McCarthy ("Let us go to a better town.. otherwise we'll go to the Thames")
- "Up Against the Wall" by Tom Robinson Band (Whitehall/Brixton/Notting Hill Gate/County Hall)
- "Up at the House of Cecil Sharp" by Bob & Carole Pegg (part of Mr Fox)
- "Up on the Catwalk" by Simple Minds (Brixton)
- "Up The Bracket" by The Libertines
- "Up The Elephant And Round The Castle" by Keith Emerson & Jim Davidson
- "Up The Junction" by Manfred Mann
- "Up The Junction" by Squeeze
- "Up The Spurs" by The Cheers
- "Upfield" by Billy Bragg
- "Upon Hilly Fields" by Lucky Soul (Brockley/Lewisham)
- "Upper Clapton Dance" by Professor Green
- "Upper Osterley" by Norma Tanega
- "Upminster Kid" by Kilburn and the High Roads (Romford)
- "Upper Norwood Girls" by Russ Abbot
- "Uxbridge Stomp" by Ray Foxley

== V ==
- "V Thirteen" by Big Audio Dynamite
- "Vagt Ved Kongens Slot (Vor Dem Buckingham Palast)" by Ulla Pia
- "Valley Floyd Road" by Charlton Athletic
- "The Vampire of Highgate" by Marc Almond
- "The Vauxhall Labyrinth" by Mount Vernon Arts Lab
- "Vauxhall Tavern Strip Medley" by Christopher Gunning
- "Vauxhall to Lambeth Bridge" by Julie Driscoll ft Brian Auger and the Trinity
- "Victoria Gardens" by Madness
- "Victoria Park" by Beggar and Co
- "Victoria Sight" (i) by King Tubby
- "Victorian Doll" by The Cleaners from Venus (Islington, Clerkenwell, Kensal Rise..)
- "A View From Her Room" by Weekend
- "Violence Grows" by Fatal Microbes
- "Violet Hill" by Coldplay (St John's Wood)
- "The Vision of Peregrine Worsthorne" by McCarthy (Fleet Street)
- "Visitors London" by Betty Roe
- "Voices in Westminster Abbey" by John Mills-Cockell
- "Vor Dem Buckingham Palast" by Peggy March

== W ==
- "W9" by Baby Ford
- "W11 Blues" by Transvision Vamp
- "W11 To Whangaroa Bay" by Tex Pistol (an alias of Ian Morris)
- "Waiting for the 7.18" by Bloc Party
- "Waiting for the Worms" by Pink Floyd (from The Wall, narrates a journey from Brixton to Westminster)
- "Waiting in Walthamstow" by The Cranberries
- "Walk of Life" by Spice Girls (from Spiceworld 1997)
- "Walk to Regents Park" by John Murphy
- "Walking Back To Waterloo" by Bee Gees
- "The Walking Birds of Carnaby" by Ross Bagdasarian
- "Walking Down Brick Lane" by Juan María Solare
- "Walking in London" by Concrete Blonde
- "Walking Talking London Blues" by Meic Stevens
- "Walnut Tree Walk" by Dave Stewart and Barbara Gaskin
- "Wake Up London!" by The Vulcans (TV Theme)
- "Wapping Steps" by Jools Holland
- "Wardour Street Waltz" by Cy Grant and Bill Le Sage
- "Warwick Avenue" by Duffy
- "Waterloo" by Dream Academy
- "Waterloo Bridge" by Jools Holland
- "Waterloo Bridge" by Ted Heath (bandleader)
- "Waterloo Lily" by Caravan
- "Waterloo Road" by Jason Crest
- "Waterloo Rock" by Don Reco (Rico Rodriguez)
- "Waterloo Station" by Jane Birkin (lyrics by Rufus Wainwright)
- "Waterloo Sunset" by The Kinks
- "Waterloo Walk" by John Dankworth
- "We All Follow Man Utd" by Manchester United FC
- "We Are London" by Madness (The Liberty of Norton Folgate album)
- "We Are The Firm" by Cockney Rejects
- "We Are The Lambeth Boys" by Johnny Dankworth
- "We Are Wimbledon" by Wimbledon FC
- "We Call It Acieeed" by D-Mob (about the London Acid House scene mentions the "Spectrum", "Future" and "Shoom" Acid House parties).
- "We Got The Juice" by Freeez
- "We Live in London Baby" by Roy Ayers
- "We Live Our Lives in City Streets" by Noël Coward ("The London traffic's steady roar can stir our hearts a great deal more")
- "We Shall Not Be Moved" by Liverpool F.C.
- "We the Kings of Orient" by Leyton Orient F.C.
- "Welcome" by The Who
- "Welcome 2 London" by Sandeeno & Joseph Cotton
- "Welcome to London Town" by Julian Dawson
- "Welcome to London Town" by Plainsong
- "Wellington Barracks" by Haydn Wood (from Snapshots of London Suite)
- "Wellington Goes To Waterloo" by The Wombles
- "Wembley Stadium" by Ken Mackintosh
- "Wembley Way" by Albert Elms
- "Wembley Wembley" by Special Duties
- "We're Going to the Country" by Lionel Bart
- "Werewolf (Loose in London)" by Meco
- "Werewolves in London" by London
- "Werewolves of London" by Paul Roland
- "Werewolves of London" by Warren Zevon
- "West Eleven" [I] by The Cimarons
- "West End" by Thomas Leer
- "West End Girl" by Darryl Read
- "West End Girls" by Pet Shop Boys
- "West End Lane" by Workshy
- "West End Pad" by Cathy Dennis
- "West End of Park Lane" by Hot Chocolate
- "West End Riot" by The Living End
- "West End Story" by Dub Pistols
- "West London" by Charles Ives
- "West London Ghosts" by Guiye Frayo
- "West of Carnaby" by Sounds Orchestral ft. Johnny Pearson
- "West of London Town" by The Bolshoi
- "West One" by Rupie Edwards
- "West One (Shine on Me)" by The Ruts
- "West Side Boys" by Cockney Rejects
- "Westend Stars" by Vice Squad
- "Westminster" by Eric Coates (from London Suite)
- "Westminster Abbey" by (from Blondel)
- "Westminster Abbey" by Henry Purcell
- "Westminster And Wandsworth" by Blyth Power
- "Westminster Bridge" by Mike Westbrook
- "Westminster Bridge" by Murray Gold
- "Westminster Carillon" by Carson Cooman
- "Westminster Chimes" by Sonic Youth
- "Westminster Pier To Greenwich" by Instant Sunshine
- "Westminster Waltz"[I] by Robert Farnon (recorded by Russ Conway among many others)
- "Westway" by Baby Ford
- "Westway" by Dub Pistols
- "Wet Day in London" by Phil Daniels And The Cross
- "We've Got the Juice" by Derek B
- "Wham Rap! (Enjoy What You Do)" by Wham! (full version)
- "What A Day in London" from Pocahontas II: Journey to a New World
- "What A Waste" by Ian Dury ("Fulham Broadway station")
- "What Are The Odds Today (Lloyds of London)" (from Around the World in 80 Days)
- "What Are We Gonna Get 'Er Indoors?" by Dennis Waterman and George Cole
- "Whatever Happened To Thames Beat" by The Times
- "What's Happening To Old London Town" by Harry Fowler
- "When a Fellow Loves a Girl in London Town" (from the musical comedy Havana)
- "When Finchley Castle Falls" by Robb Johnson
- "When I Grow Up I Want To Be..." by Television Personalities (Chelsea Embankment)
- "When I'm Strolling Around Mayfair" by Bill Shepherd (arranger for the Bee Gees)
- "When the Guards Do the Birdcage Walk" by Fred Godfrey and John P. Harrington
- "When The Lights Go Out in London" by The Charlatans
- "When the Lights Go Up in London" by Hubert Gregg
- "When Tottenham Burned" by Robb Johnson
- "When We Were Girls Together" by Noël Coward ("Oh how the gallants of Battersea Rise followed us round with lascivious eyes")
- "When You Come Back To Me" by Jason Donovan
- "When you go Over to London, as Lots of Germans do..." by Adrian Ross and Basil Hood (from the musical play The Girls of Gottenberg)
- "When You Hear Big Ben" by Vera Lynn
- "While London Sleeps" by Mount Vernon Arts Lab
- "While London Sleeps" by Roy Hudd
- "While London's Days Increase" by Tim Hollier
- "While London's Fast Asleep" by Harry Dacre
- "White City" by Bill Pritchard
- "White City" by The Pogues
- "White City Blues" by Ian Carr's Nucleus
- "White City Boys" by Chiefs of Relief
- "White City Fighting" by Pete Townshend
- "White City Lights" by Roger Daltrey
- "(White Man) In Hammersmith Palais" by The Clash
- "White Post Lane" by Saint Etienne
- "White Riot" by The Clash (about the 1976 Notting Hill Carnival)
- "Whitechapel" by Chaim Towber with Johnny Franks Orchestra (1951)
- "Whitechapel" by Fats Waller (from The London Suite)
- "Whitechapel" by SCUM
- "Whitechapel Mound" by Cathal Coughlan
- "Whitehall Farce" by Instant Sunshine
- "Whitehall Scandal" by Dennis Bovell
- "Whitton High Street" by Robb Johnson
- "Wimbledon" by Dave Warner
- "Wimpy Bar Blues" by Ram John Holder
- "The Winter Of '79" by Tom Robinson Band
- "Who Are You" by The Who
- "Who Dares Wins" by The Streets
- "Who Got the Funk?" by The Streets
- "Whoppi King" by Laurel Aitken
- "Why Can't We Have the Sea in London?" by Fred Godfrey and Billy Williams
- "Why London" by Eskobar
- "Why Should I Mind" by Tom Robinson Band
- "Whyteleafe" by Saint Etienne
- "The Wickedest Sound" by Rebel MC
- "Wigmore Extempore" by Stan Tracey
- "Wild West End" by Dire Straits
- "Wild Women" by Benny Hill ("Now I was in a Chelsea bar one day")
- "Willesden Green" by The Kinks
- "Willesden To Cricklewood" by Joe Strummer and the Mescaleros
- "William And Mary Op. 106" by Derek Bourgeois
- "Willin' (Rock Against Racism)" by The Cimarons ([aka "Harlesden Rock"])
- "Wimbledon Idyll" by Kit and The Widow
- "Wimbledon Lawns" by Jo Durie
- "Wimbledon Music" by Amalgam (featuring Trevor Watts)
- "Wimbledon Parts" by Lol Coxhill and Steve Miller
- "Wimbledon Sunset" by The Wombles
- "Wimpole Street Song" from Robert and Elizabeth
- "Winchmore Hill" by Juan María Solare
- "The Wine Bars of Old Hampstead Town" by Alexei Sayle (folk song parody)
- "Wine, Women An' Song" by Whitesnake (Fleet Street)
- "Wings (London/L.A.)" by Randy Edelman
- "Winter Winds" by Mumford and Sons ("as the winter winds litter London with lonely hearts")
- "With Her Head Tucked Underneath Her Arm" by R. P. Weston and Bert Lee ("In the Tower of London large as life..")
- "Without You" by The Feeling
- "The Womble Bashers of Walthamstow" by Grimms
- "Wombledon Sunset" by The Wombles
- "The Wombling Song" by The Wombles
- "Wombling USA" by The Wombles (Wimbledon)
- "Women In Uniform" by Iron Maiden
- "The Wonderful World of Abbey Road" by David Peel
- "Wondering" by Dirty Pretty Things ("and it occurred to me/I think on Lambeth Road..")
- "Wood Green" by Alex Welsh & His Band
- "Wood Green Walk" by Juan María Solare
- "Wood Wharf Gumbo" by Aviator
- "The Worker" by Fischer Z (Waterloo)
- "Working Mother" by Martyn Joseph
- "The World is Coming to London" by Billy Cotton
- "Worldwide (London Groove)" by The Roots
- "Wormwood Scrubs" by Dominic Behan
- "Wormwood Scrubs - Dawn" by Kenny Clarke/Francy Boland Big Band
- "The Wormwood Scrubs Tango" by Spike Milligan
- "The Worst Pies in London" by Stephen Sondheim
- "Would you care to settle? Where it is going to be? ... Oh! I bar the Registrar, Westminster for me! ... Shall we state the happy.." by Arthur Wimperis and Max Pemberton
- "Wreckx Shop" by Wreckx-n-Effect featuring Apache Indian
- "A Wrong Turn and Raindrops" by The Field Mice
- "Wrottersley Road" by Nick Nicely
- "Wurzel Fudge in London Town" by Ian Whitcomb

== X ==
- "XR2" by MIA

== Y ==
- "Ya Ga Ya Ga A Tramp" by Trinity
- "Ye Citizens of London" from Doris (opera)
- "The Year She Spent in England" by Weddings Parties Anything ("And the treasures found in Camden..")
- "The Yeomen of the Guard Overture" [I] by Arthur Sullivan
- "Yo Go Monarchs" by London Monarchs
- "Yonatan Sa HaBaita" by Oshik Levi (Hebrew: יונתן סע הביתה, translation: "Yonatan, Go Home")
- "You Broke My Heart In 17 Places" by Tracey Ullman (Shepherd's Bush)
- "You Can Judge A Book By Its Cover" by Saint Etienne (SW14, Hanover Square etc.)
- "You Can't Always Get What You Want" by The Rolling Stones (Chelsea drug store)
- "You Can't Do It in London" by Overlord X
- "You From London" by Sault
- "You Lift Me Up" by Everything but the Girl ("And the trains run late, I'm stuck at Notting Hill Gate..")
- "You'll Always Find Me in the Kitchen at Parties" by Jona Lewie ("This was at some do in Palmers Green..")
- "The Young and the Old" by Madness "All the old songs, the cockney routines.."
- "Young London" by Angels & Airwaves
- "Youth of Eglington" by Black Uhuru ("youth of Brixton..")
- "You're In A Bad Way" by Saint Etienne "A man could lose himself in London.."
- "You're So London" by Julie Andrews And Carol Burnett
- "You're The One For Me, Fatty" by Morrissey ("All over Battersea, some hope and some despair..")
- "You've Got Her London" by Pierce Turner

== See also ==
- List of music videos set in London
