= Max Décharné =

British musician

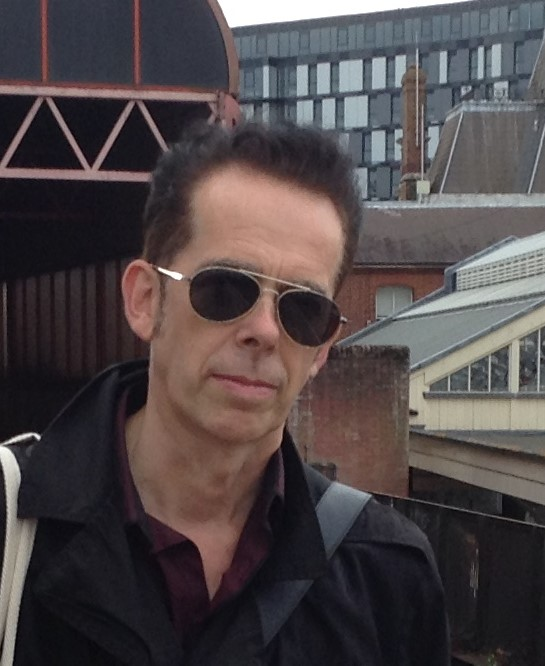

Background information
- Genres: Garage punk Indie rock Swamp rock
- Occupations: Musician, singer-songwriter, journalist, author (non-fiction and short stories)
- Instruments: Vocals, organ, piano, maracas, drums
- Years active: 1985–to date
- Labels: Ace Records/ Big Beat Records(current); Camden Town Records; Clawfist; Vinyl Japan; US – Alternative Tentacles; Sire Records
- Website: maxdcharn.bandcamp.com/community

Max Décharné is an English rock musician and singer, and the author of ten books, mostly non-fiction, and numerous short stories.

== Music and writing ==
Max Décharné has written about music regularly for Mojo magazine since 1998, prior to which he wrote extensively about film for Neon. In addition, his work has also appeared in the Daily Telegraph, The New European, The Spectator, the Sunday Times Colour Magazine, the Observer, the Guardian and the TLS, among others. He has interviewed a wide variety of cultural figures, including Mary Quant, Nick Cave, Christopher Lee, Wanda Jackson, Mick Farren, Colin Wilson, The Trashmen, Ingrid Pitt, Dion DiMucci, John Peel, Cynthia Plastercaster, Sonny Burgess, Wreckless Eric and Dick Dale. Décharné has also produced sleeve notes for numerous record reissues of box sets, albums and singles by artists such as Gene Vincent, Chuck Berry, Eddie Cochran, Little Richard and Sparkle Moore, and also the acclaimed 6-CD Nikki Sudden box set The Boy From Nowhere Who Fell Out Of The Sky.

In 1985 he started writing short stories and in 1986, inspired by the postpunk DIY ethic, co-founded the Malice Aforethought Press with Frank Key. Over the next few years they published a large number of short-run pamphlets. Titles by Décharné included "The Importance of Being Harnessed" and "The Night They Invented Shampoo". Most of these texts were later collected in paperback. He also appeared as a guest on Frank Key's weekly Resonance FM Radio show "Hooting Yard on the Air" in which the former publishing partners discussed their love of unusual literature.

In his musical career, Décharné has released thirteen albums and something in the region of twenty singles since 1989. He played drums with his friend Nikki Sudden before joining Gallon Drunk in 1991, with whom he toured the world. Since 1994, he has been the singer and principal songwriter with The Flaming Stars. In a long and varied career in the music business, he has also recorded nine John Peel Sessions and played shows all across the US, Canada, virtually every country in Europe and also in Japan. One of his songs made the 1995 John Peel Festive Fifty (Kiss Tomorrow Goodbye by The Flaming Stars), then two more of his songs were in the 1996 John Peel Festive Fifty (Ten Feet Tall and The Face On The Bar Room Floor, both by The Flaming Stars).

Décharné is probably one of the only people currently writing about music to have played on BBCTV's Later... with Jools Holland show, on the main stage at the Reading Festival, at Madison Square Garden and at the Hollywood Bowl.

== Bibliography ==
=== Books ===
- Teddy Boys: Post-war Britain and the First Youth Revolution (hardback), Profile Books, January 2024 (ISBN 978 1 8466 8978 9)
- King's Road: The Rise And Fall of the Hippest Street in the World (second, extended edition), Omnibus Press, 2023 (ISBN 978 1 9131 7260 2); (Special edition ISBN 978 1 9158 4102 5)
- Vulgar Tongues: An Alternative History of English Slang, Serpent's Tail, 2016 (ISBN 978 1 84668 561 3)
- Capital Crimes: Seven Centuries of London Life and Murder, Random House Books, 2012 (Arrow Books 2013) (ISBN 978 0 099539 025)
- Rocket In My Pocket, Serpent's Tail, 2010 (ISBN 978 1 84668 721 1) NB Ace Records (United Kingdom) issued a compilation CD with sleeve notes by Max to tie in with this book.
- King's Road: The Rise And Fall of the Hippest Street in the World, Weidenfeld & Nicolson, 2005 (ISBN 0 297 84769 4)
- Hardboiled Hollywood – The Origins of the Great Crime Films, No Exit Press, 2003 (ISBN 1 84243 070 X)
- Straight From the Fridge, Dad: A Dictionary of Hipster Slang, No Exit Press, 2000 (2nd edition in 2004, 3rd edition in 2009) (ISBN 978-1-84243-288-4)
- I Was A Teenage Warehouse & Other Stories, Thirst Editions, 1997 (ISBN 0 9531238 0 4)
- The Prisoner Of Brenda & Other Stories, Malice Aforethought Press, 1991 (ISBN 1 871197 92 9)
- Beat Your Relatives To A Bloody Pulp & Other Stories, Malice Aforethought Press, 1989 (ISBN 1 871197 93 7)

=== Selected Reviews of his Books ===
- Teddy Boys - Profile Books, January 2024
  - "Teddy Boys is excellent on the social conditions within which the style evolved… Décharné’s book is a loving reclamation of an important youth type – now seen as reactionaries, but who were groundbreakers, in their early phase at least. Most of all, in focusing on the late Forties and early Fifties, Teddy Boys illuminates a fascinating and still under-explored period in British youth culture and social history." - Jon Savage, New Statesman
  - "Expert research, insider knowledge and love for the subject all make for a thumping good read" - Claudia Elliott, Classic Rock magazine (9 stars of a possible 10)
- King's Road - Omnibus Press, 2023
  - "A gloriously forensic expansion… happily the vanishing art of investigative writing survives in this magnificent tribute now destined to sit with the UK’s great socio-cultural chronicles 4****" - Kris Needs, Record Collector
- Vulgar Tongues – An Alternative History Of English Slang, Serpent's Tail, 2016
  - "Max Décharné's engaging book Vulgar Tongues is a spectacular feat, collating information from a mind-boggling range of sources - from jazz lyrics to dime novels, from 18th century brothel directories to 1960s criminal autobiographies." - Lynne Truss, New Statesman
- A Rocket In My Pocket – Serpent's Tail, 2010
  - "The definitive book on rockabilly.. tells you all you need to know." - Andrew Weatherall, BBC 6 Music
- King's Road – The Rise And Fall Of The Hippest Street In The World, Weidenfeld & Nicolson, 2005
  - "As a trawl through the glitz and glamour of the King’s Road, this is hard to beat. Décharné’s research, which takes in everything from political weeklies to underground pop magazines, is impressive and unimpeachable, and he whisks the reader along in brisk and witty prose." - Dominic Sandbrook, Sunday Times
- Hardboiled Hollywood – No Exit Press, 2003
  - "Full of "unauthorised cash withdrawals" and people dying of "lead poisoning", this tome thankfully eschews the pompous subtext and strained metaphors of most film books, leaving what any good detective wants: just the facts, ma'am." - Phelim O’Neill, The Guardian
- Straight From The Fridge, Dad – No Exit Press, 2000
  - "If you are the kind of hep cat who harbours a burning urge to gas the slobs, then the righteous Max is the man. He shoots the works to fascinating and often hilarious effect." - Esquire

=== Malice Aforethought Press Booklets ===
- The Petrified Florist, pamphlet, Malice Aforethought Press, 14 February 1991 (ISBN 1 871197 76 7)
- The Little Sheep of Horrors, pamphlet, Malice Aforethought Press, 30 September 1990 (ISBN 1 871197 49 X)
- Slogans for the Unhinged, limited edition pamphlet of 50 copies, Malice Aforethought Press, 29 September 1990 (ISBN 1 871197 97 X)
- UFOs - Who Gives a Flying One?, limited edition pamphlet of 50 copies, Malice Aforethought Press, 3 August 1990 (ISBN 1 871197 01 5)
- Epigrams, limited edition pamphlet of 50 copies, Malice Aforethought Press, 3 August 1990 (ISBN 1 871197 03 1)
- The Sheep of Things to Come, limited edition pamphlet of 47 copies, Malice Aforethought Press, 3 February 1990 (ISBN 1 871197 33 3)
- Hello Jung Lovers, Wherever You Are, limited edition pamphlet of 27 copies (hand-singed (yes, singed) by the author), Malice Aforethought Press, 3 April 1989 (ISBN 1 871197 55 4)
- Beat Your Relatives To A Bloody Pulp, limited edition pamphlet (some on tea-stained paper), Malice Aforethought Press, 1988 (ISBN 1 871197 59 7)
- The Night They Invented Shampoo, limited edition pamphlet of 35 copies, Malice Aforethought Press, 1988 (re-issued in July 1990) (ISBN 1 871197 77 5)
- The Importance of Being Harnessed, limited edition pamphlet of 25 copies, Malice Aforethought Press, February 1987 (ISBN 1 871197 20 1)
- Smooching with Istvan, (with Frank Key) - limited edition journal of 100 copies, with hand-painted covers, Malice Aforethought Press, Spring 1987 (ISBN 1 871197 10 4)
- Stab Your Employer, (with Frank Key) - limited edition journal of 50 copies, Malice Aforethought Press, Autumn 1986

=== Stories by Max in various anthologies ===
- The Woman At The Late Show in the Cornell Woolrich-inspired crime anthology Black Is The Night, edited by Maxim Jakubowski, Titan Books, 2022. (ISBN 9781789099997)
- Midget Submarines in the collection Bullman, Janine, ed., Punk Fiction - An Anthology of Stories Inspired By Punk, Portico, 2009. (ISBN 9781906032661)
- Chelsea Three, Scotland Yard Nil in the collection Unsworth, Cathi, ed., London Noir, Serpent's Tail, 2006. (ISBN 1852429305)
- The occasional magazine Massacre, compiled by Roberta McKeown, contained several stories by Max - namely I Was a Teenage Warehouse (Massacre 1, 1990), The Black Shape of the Family (Massacre 2, 1991) and Dining Out in Paris and London (Massacre 3, 1992)

== Discography ==
=== Solo albums ===
- Veronica’s Lake (Bandcamp, November 15th 2025 and on vinyl from Dangerhouse Skylab, November 2025)
- Night Darkens The Streets (Bandcamp, November 2024 and on vinyl from Dangerhouse Skylab, November 2024)
  - "Like an evocative collision between Lou Reed and Nick Cave … a contender for the year’s coolest album" 4/5 Kris Needs, Record Collector [December 2024 issue]
  - "The songs, mainly cautionary tales, are filled with resignation and graveyard humour, with titles that could be lifted straight from a ’50s pulp noir." 4/5 Lois Wilson, MOJO [January 2025 issue]
- Sixteen Coaches Long (Bandcamp, September 2020)
- New Shade of Black (Bandcamp, May 2020 and on vinyl from Dangerhouse Skylab, July 2022)

=== The Flaming Stars ===
==== Studio albums ====
- Born Under a Bad Neon Sign (Big Beat, 2006)
- Named and Shamed (Vinyl Japan 2004 - Vinyl and CD)
- Sunset & Void (Vinyl Japan 2002 - Vinyl and CD)
- A Walk on the Wired Side (Vinyl Japan 2001 - Vinyl and CD)
- Pathway (Vinyl Japan 1999 - Vinyl and CD)
- Sell Your Soul to the Flaming Stars (Vinyl Japan 1997 - CD only)
- Songs from the Bar Room Floor (Vinyl Japan 1996 - Vinyl and CD)

==== Singles / EPs ====
- "Stranger on the Fifth Floor" / "New Hope for the Dead" (live in Germany) (Vinyl Japan 2005 - Vinyl only)
- "Spilled Your Pint" / "Sixty Nine" (Vinyl Japan, Bang! Records, 2004 - Vinyl only)
- "A Little Bit Like You" / "The Man Who Would be B.B. King" (Vinyl Japan, September 2002 - Vinyl only)
- "One Lonely Night" / "Days Like This" (Alternative Tentacles, September 2001 - Vinyl only)
- "You Don't Always Want What You Get" / "Saturday Night Special" (Vinyl Japan, January 2001 - Vinyl only)
- "Only Tonight" (Vinyl Japan, November 1999 - CD-R radio station promo only)
- "Sweet Smell of Success" / "The Day The Earth Caught Fire" / "Never Missed You Tonight" / "A Place in the Sun" (Vinyl Japan, April 1998 - CD, plus Vinyl with just the first two tracks)
- "New Hope for the Dead" / "Are You Being Served" (Vinyl Japan, October 1997 - Vinyl only - limited edition of 2,000)
- "Bury My Heart at Pier 13" / "Down to You" (live in London) (Vinyl Japan, March 1997 - Vinyl only - limited edition of 2,000)
- "Ten Feet Tall" / "Spaghetti Junction" (Vinyl Japan, December 1996 - Vinyl only - limited edition of 1,000)
- "Downhill Without Brakes" / "Broken Heart" / "Eat Your Heart Out" / "Burnt Out Wreck of a Man" (Vinyl Japan, May 1996 - Vinyl and CD)
- "Money To Burn” / “Bandit Country" / "A Hell of a Woman" / "New Shade of Black" (Vinyl Japan, December 1995 - Vinyl and CD)
- "The Face on the Bar Room Floor" / "Get Carter" (Vinyl Japan, August 1995 - Vinyl only)
- "Hospital, Heaven or Hell" (tracks "Kiss Tomorrow Goodbye" / "Davy Jones' Locker" / "Like Trash" / "Revenge" – Vinyl Japan, March 1995 - Vinyl and CD)

==== Other albums ====
- John Peel Session 19.02.02 (Precious Recordings PRE041, June 2024 - 10” Vinyl and Digital via Bandcamp)
- John Peel Session 17.10.96 (Precious Recordings PRE042, June 2024 - 10” Vinyl and Digital via Bandcamp)
- London After Midnight: Singles, Rarities and Bar Room Floor-Fillers 1995–2005 (Big Beat Records, 2006)
- Ginmill Perfume, (Alternative Tentacles, October 2001) (North American release only - Vinyl and CD)
- Tijuana Bible, (Nippon Columbia, July 2000) (Japanese release CD only)
- The Six John Peel Sessions (Vinyl Japan, 2000 - CD only)
- Bring Me the Rest of Alfredo Garcia (Singles 1995–1996) (Vinyl Japan, March 1997 - CD only)

==== Tracks on other compilations ====
- Bring Me the Rest of Alfredo Garcia appeared on “Apocalypse Always” (Alternative Tentacles, 2002)
- Ten Feet Tall appeared on the five-track “ABUS 55” CD, which was given away with Issue 67 of the magazine “Abus Dangereux” (2000)
- The Flaming Stars contributed a cover of Brickfield Nights to the Boys tribute album Satisfaction Guaranteed (Vinyl Japan, 1999. NB Max also wrote the sleeve notes to the band's Peel Sessions Vinyl Japan album of the same year.)
- Sweet Smell of Success and Money to Burn appeared on "Thoughts of British Trash" (Vinyl Japan, 1998) NB the Earls of Suave track Somebody Buy Me a Drink also appears on this Japanese sampler, available as a CD and vinyl album.
- A Hell of a Woman appeared on "Plan Boom" (What's That Noise, 1998)
- Like Trash appeared on "What Did You Come Down Here For? Music from Club Zitt" (Genki, 1996)
- Back of My Mind appeared on "Cowpunks" (Vinyl Junkie, 1996)
- Bring Me the Rest of Alfredo Garcia appeared on the 'CD magazine' "Volume 15" (Volume, 1995)
- The Face on the Bar Room Floor appeared on "Various Artists do the Nuclear Tests in Paris and Beijing" (Vinyl Japan, 1995) NB The Earls of Suave track "A Cheat" also appears on the same CD. The Earls featured many of The Flaming Stars.

=== Holly Golightly ===
==== Single ====
- Sand / Lonesome Town (Box Theory Records, 1996) – Max sings uncredited duet with Holly on Sand (this version of the track appears also on Holly's compilation Singles Round Up - Damaged Goods, 2001). Holly returned the favour with the duet on the title track of the Flaming Stars album Born Under a Bad Neon Sign.

=== The Earls of Suave ===
==== Studio albums ====
- The Basement Bar at the Heartbreak Hotel (Vinyl Japan, 1994)

==== 10 inch Compilation LP ====
- THE KING AND I - PURR Magazine 10 inch compilation, Blueyedog Records, 1994. The Earls of Suave appear on this with the song Yabba Dabba Doo.

==== Singles ====
- In My Dreams / Somebody Buy Me a Drink (Vinyl Japan, 1994)
- A Cheat / Who Will the Next Fool Be? (Camden Town Records, 1992)

=== Gallon Drunk ===
==== Studio albums ====
- From the Heart of Town (1993) Clawfist/Sire (UK #67)
- You, the Night ... and the Music (1992) Clawfist

==== 10 inch LP ====
- Clawfist: The Peel Sessions - the Gallon Drunk Peel session, plus one by the band Breed (Strange Fruit, 1992). Gallon Drunk tracks: Ruby / Some Fool’s Mess / Drag ’91 / Two Wings Mambo.

==== Live CD/DVD ====
- Access All Areas (Edsel Records live CD and DVD of five tracks from the 1992 NME Town & Country Club show, released 2015)

==== Singles ====
- Live At Madison Square Garden Promo – Just One More / Some Fool’s Mess / Two Wings Mambo (Clawfist, 1993)
- Bedlam / Look at That Woman / Solitaire (Clawfist, 1992)
- Some Fool’s Mess / May the Earth Open Here / Rolling Home (Clawfist, 1991)

==== Tracks on Compilations ====
- Arlington Rd appeared on the Lime Lizard magazine free cover-mounted cassette The Sound of Mob Culture (Lime Lizard cassette, 1993)
- Bedlam also appeared on NME Singles of the Week 1992 (RCA CD, 1993)
- Bedlam appeared on Sire's Lucky 13 For 93 (Sire Records Promo CD, 1993)
- A specially-recorded version of Keep Moving On appeared on Volume Six (Volume CD magazine, 1993)
- Some Fool's Mess also appeared on (Another Kind Of) Noise (Continental Records CD, Brazil, 1992)
- Some Fool's Mess appeared on Independent 20 (Beechwood Music CD, 1992)
- A live version of Two Wings Mambo appeared on Viva Eight! Highlights of the NME Viva Eight Concerts at the Town & Country Club September 1–8, 1992 (Spastics Society CD, 1992)
- A specially-recorded version of Ruby appeared on Volume Two (Volume CD magazine, 1991)

=== Nikki Sudden ===
==== Studio albums ====
- Egyptian Roads, Indies Records, 1997
- Seven Lives Later, Glitterhouse, 1996

==== Compilations ====
- The Boy From Nowhere Who Fell Out Of The Sky, Easy Action, 2013. Max is on various tracks, three previously unreleased
- The Point & The Rays, Barracuda Blue, 1991 – A Marc Bolan tribute compilation, including Nikki's version of Bolan's Buick Mackane, recorded live in Germany in 1990

== Filmography ==
=== Appearances ===
- Pervirella, Alex Chandon, 1997 - Max plays the part of the Curator
- One For The Ladies - Gallon Drunk live video, which contains a complete show filmed on 21 December 1991 in London. Released on VHS in 1992 on the Jettisoundz label, and then on DVD in 2005 on Cherry Red.
- Grand Union: A Short Film - Frank Tovey - shot in 1991 and released in 2006 as part of the Fad Gadget by Frank Tovey CD/DVD package (Mute Records). Max was producer and principal cameraman.

=== Soundtrack Contributions ===
- Crust - Mark Locke, 2001 - includes Max's song 3.a.m. On The Bar Room Floor by The Flaming Stars
- The Jolly Boys Last Stand - Christopher Payne, 2000 - includes Max's songs Like Trash and The Face On The Bar Room Floor by The Flaming Stars
- Dust Devil - Richard Stanley, 1992 - includes the song which Max co-wrote, You Can Call by the Earls Of Suave
