= Clawfist - The Peel Sessions =

1992 EP by Gallon Drunk and Breed

Clawfist – The Peel Sessions

EP by Gallon Drunk • Breed
- Released: 20 November 1992
- Recorded: 14 and 28 July 1991 at BBC's studios
- Genre: Noise rock, punk blues
- Length: 34:35
- Label: Strange Fruit Records
- Producer: Dale Griffin

Gallon Drunk chronology
You, the Night ... and the Music (1992)	Clawfist – The Peel Sessions (1992)	From the Heart of Town (1993)

Professional ratings
Review scores
Source	Rating
Allmusic	3/5 stars

Clawfist – The Peel Sessions is a split EP recorded by John Peel at BBC's studios, released on 20 November 1992 through Strange Fruit Records. The first half contains Gallon Drunk's session, recorded on 14 July 1991; the second half contains Breed's session, recorded on 28 July 1991.

== Track listing ==
No.	Title	Writer(s)	Length
1.	"Ruby"	Joy May Creasy, Simeon, Danny Taylor	4:40
2.	"Some Fool's Mess"	Joe Byfield, Max Décharné, Mike Delanian, James Johnston	5:45
3.	"Drag '91"	Joe Byfield, Max Décharné, Mike Delanian, James Johnston	3:00
4.	"Two Wings Mambo"	Mike Delanian, James Johnston	5:10
5.	"Splinter"	Simon Breed, Steve Hewitt, Andrew Park	3:35
6.	"Perfect Hangover"	Simon Breed, Steve Hewitt, Andrew Park	3:10
7.	"Pendulum"	Simon Breed, Steve Hewitt, Andrew Park	3:55
8.	"Hard Cash"	Simon Breed, Steve Hewitt, Andrew Park	5:20

== Personnel ==
Breed

- Simon Breed – vocals, guitar
- Steve Hewitt – drums
- Andrew Park – drums

Gallon Drunk

- Joe Byfield – maracas
- Max Décharné – drums
- Mike Delanian – bass guitar
- James Johnston – vocals, guitar, organ

Production and additional personnel

- Mike Engles – engineering
- Dale Griffin – production
- Dave McCarthy – engineering
