= London After Midnight =

London After Midnight may refer to:

- London After Midnight (film), a lost 1927 silent mystery film directed by Tod Browning
- London After Midnight, a 1996 book by Peter Haining

== Music ==
- London After Midnight (band), a dark wave band from Los Angeles, California
- London After Midnight, a 2006 compilation album by The Flaming Stars
- "London After Midnight", a song by The Flaming Stars from Sell Your Soul to the Flaming Stars
