= From the Heart of Town =

Studio album by Gallon Drunk
- Released: 13 April 1993
- Recorded: 18 September 1992–10 October 1992 at Elephant Studios, London, England
- Genre: Noise rock, punk blues
- Length: 46:04
- Label: Sire
- Producer: Phil Wright

Gallon Drunk chronology
Clawfist - The Peel Sessions (1992)	From the Heart of Town (1993)	In the Long Still Night (1996)

Professional ratings
Review scores
Source	Rating
AllMusic	4/5 stars
Q	3/5 stars

From the Heart of Town is the second album by Gallon Drunk, released in 1993 through Sire Records.

== Track listing ==
No.	Title	Writer(s)	Length
1.	"Jake on the Make"	James Johnston	3:17
2.	"Arlington Road"	Joe Byfield, Max Décharné, Mike Delanian, James Johnston	5:40
3.	"Not Before Time"	Mike Delanian, James Johnston	3:58
4.	"Keep Moving On"	James Johnston	3:40
5.	"Bedlam"	James Johnston	6:47
6.	"You Should be Ashamed"	James Johnston, Geraldine Swayne	3:16
7.	"End of the Line"	Mike Delanian, James Johnston	4:22
8.	"Loving Alone"	James Johnston	3:48
9.	"Push the Boat Out"	James Johnston	6:41
10.	"Paying for Pleasure"	Mike Delanian, James Johnston	4:29

2007 remastered CD
No.	Title	Writer(s)	Length
11.	"Look at That Woman"	Lee Hazlewood	2:54
12.	"Solitaire"	Phil Cody, Neil Sedaka	4:07
13.	"Silver Wings"	Merle Haggard	3:03
14.	"The Amsterdam Run" (live)	Joe Byfield, Max Décharné, Mike Delanian, James Johnston	3:17
15.	"Just One More" (live)	James Johnston	3:34
16.	"Some Fool's Mess" (live)	Joe Byfield, Max Décharné, Mike Delanian, James Johnston	5:09
17.	"Two Wings Mambo" (live)	Mike Delanian, James Johnston	8:00
18.	"Gallon Drunk" (live)	Joe Byfield, Nick Coombes, Mike Delanian, James Johnston	3:34

== Accolades ==
Year	Publication	Country	Accolade	Rank
1993	NME	United Kingdom	"Albums of the Year"	29
1993	Select	United Kingdom	"Albums of the Year"	32

== Chart positions ==
Charts (1993)	Peak position
UK Albums Chart	67

== Personnel ==
Gallon Drunk

- Joe Byfield – maracas
- Max Décharné – drums
- Mike Delanian – bass guitar, claves, tambourine, drums, percussion
- James Johnston – vocals, guitar, banjo, piano, organ, harmonica, percussion

Production and additional personnel

- François Deschamps – engineering
- Steve Double – photography
- Terry Edwards – saxophone on "Bedlam" and "You Should Be Ashamed", trumpet on "Bedlam"
- Jem Noble – engineering
- Laetitia Sadier – additional vocals on "You Should Be Ashamed" and "Loving Alone"
- Geraldine Swayne – additional vocals on "You Should Be Ashamed" and "Push the Boat Out"
- Phil Wright – production, Hammond organ on "Loving Alone"
