= The Rotten Mile =

Studio album by Gallon Drunk
- Released: 22 October 2007
- Recorded: Fortress Studios
- Genre: Post-punk, punk blues
- Length: 43:49
- Label: Fred
- Producer: Tom Morris

Gallon Drunk chronology
Fire Music (2002)	The Rotten Mile (2007)	The Road Gets Darker from Here (2012)

Professional ratings
Review scores
Source	Rating
BBC	Positive
The Times	Positive

The Rotten Mile is the sixth album by Gallon Drunk, released on 22 October 2007 on the Fred label.

== Track listing ==
No.	Title	Length
1.	"The Rotten Mile"	4:52
2.	"Give Me Back What's Mine"	2:16
3.	"Down at the Harbour"	3:39
4.	"Put the Bolt in the Door"	3:35
5.	"Grand Union Canal"	2:50
6.	"On Ward 10"	5:53
7.	"Running out of Time"	3:16
8.	"Bad Servant"	3:15
9.	"Night Panic Bossa"	4:16
10.	"Christmas"	2.35
11.	"All Hands Lost at Sea"	4:36
12.	"The Shadow of Your Smile"	2.46

== Personnel ==
Gallon Drunk

- Simon Wring – bass guitar, banjo
- Terry Edwards – saxophone, muted trumpet
- James Johnston – vocals, guitar, piano, organ, harmonica
- Ian White – drums, maracas

Production and additional personnel

- Noel Summerville – mastering
- Tom Morris – production, engineering, mixing, recording
