= The Road Gets Darker from Here =

Studio album by Gallon Drunk
- Released: 7 May 2012
- Recorded: Clouds Hill Recordings
- Genre: Post-punk
- Length: 34:56
- Label: Clouds Hill
- Producer: Johann Scheerer

Gallon Drunk chronology
The Rotten Mile (2007)	The Road Gets Darker from Here (2012)	The Soul of the Hour (2014)

Professional ratings
Review scores
Source	Rating
BBC	Positive
The Quietus	Positive

The Road Gets Darker from Here is the seventh album by English alternative rock band Gallon Drunk, released May 7, 2012, through the Clouds Hill label.

== Track listing ==
No.	Title	Length
1.	"You Made Me"	3:56
2.	"Hanging On"	3:59
3.	"A Thousand Years"	3:17
4.	"Stuck in my Head"	3:36
5.	"Killing Time"	6:22
6.	"The Big Breakdown"	5:21
7.	"I Just Can't Help But Stare"	4:40
8.	"The Perfect Dancer"	5:45

== Personnel ==
Gallon Drunk

- Terry Edwards – saxophone, maracas, bass guitar
- James Johnston – vocals, guitar, bass guitar, piano, organ
- Ian White – drums, maracas, tambourine

Production and additional personnel

- Chris Von Rautenkranz – mastering
- Johann Scheerer – production
