= Fire Music (Gallon Drunk album) =

Studio album by Gallon Drunk
- Released: 4 March 2002
- Recorded: Verdict Music Studios
- Genre: Indie rock, garage rock revival, jazz-rock
- Length: 54:19
- Label: Sweet Nothing
- Producer: Ed Rose

Gallon Drunk chronology
Black Milk (1999)	Fire Music (2002)	The Rotten Mile (2007)

Professional ratings
Review scores
Source	Rating
Allmusic	(unrated)

Fire Music is the fifth album by Gallon Drunk, released on 4 March 2002 through Sweet Nothing Records.

== Track listing ==
All tracks are written by James Johnston, except "Series of Dreams" by Bob Dylan.

No.	Title	Length
1.	"Outside of Love"	4:18
2.	"Out of Sight"	4:45
3.	"Things Will Change"	5:35
4.	"In This Moment"	7:18
5.	"Everything's Alright"	5:53
6.	"Forget All That You Know"	8:25
7.	"Just One Word"	4:13
8.	"Fire Music" (part 1)	5:04
9.	"Fire Music" (part 2)	2:39
10.	"Series of Dreams"	6:09

== Personnel ==
Gallon Drunk

- Jeremy Cottingham – bass guitar, guitar, percussion
- Terry Edwards – baritone saxophone, soprano saxophone, muted trumpet
- James Johnston – vocals, guitar, bass guitar, autoharp, piano, organ, harpsichord, harmonica, tambourine, percussion
- Ian White – drums, bongos, congas, maracas, tambourine, percussion, engineering, mixing, recording

Production and additional personnel

- Shaun Joseph – mastering
- Ed Rose – production, engineering, mixing, recording
