= In the Long Still Night =

Studio album by Gallon Drunk
- Released: 23 September 1996
- Recorded: Milo, London, England
- Genre: Post-punk
- Length: 49:42
- Label: City Slang
- Producer: Gallon Drunk, Paul Kendall, Jem Noble

Gallon Drunk chronology
From the Heart of Town (1993)	In the Long Still Night (1996)	Black Milk (1999)

Professional ratings
Review scores
Source	Rating
AllMusic	4.5/5 stars
The Encyclopedia of Popular Music	3/5 stars

In the Long Still Night is the third album by Gallon Drunk. It was released in 1996 through City Slang.

== Track listing ==
No.	Title	Writer(s)	Length
1.	"Two Clear Eyes"	James Johnston	3:57
2.	"Up on Fire"	James Johnston	4:30
3.	"It's All Mine"	James Johnston	3:00
4.	"Eternal Tide"	James Johnston	4:40
5.	"The Road Ahead"	James Johnston	5:01
6.	"The Big Payoff"	Terry Edwards, Mike Delanian, James Johnston, Ian Watson, Ian White	3:37
7.	"Take This Poison"	James Johnston	3:52
8.	"Some Cast Fire"	James Johnston	3:35
9.	"Geraldine"	Terry Edwards, James Johnston, Ian White	6:27
10.	"Get Ready..."	Terry Edwards, Mike Delanian, James Johnston, Ian Watson, Ian White	2:04
11.	"To Love Somebody"	Barry Gibb, Robin Gibb	2:42
12.	"In the Long Still Night"	James Johnston	6:17

== Accolades ==
Year	Publication	Country	Accolade	Rank
1996	NME	United Kingdom	"Albums of the Year"	30

== Personnel ==
Gallon Drunk

- Joe Byfield – maracas
- Mike Delanian – bass guitar
- Terry Edwards – saxophone, trumpet, organ, maracas
- James Johnston – vocals, guitar, Wurlitzer electric piano, organ
- Ian Watson – guitar, trumpet
- Ian White – drums

Production and additional personnel

- Denis Blackham – mastering
- Bleddyn Butcher – photography
- Gallon Drunk – production
- Paul Kendall – production, mixing
- Jem Noble – production, recording
