= Bring Me the Head of Alfredo Garcia =

1974 film by Sam Peckinpah

- Theatrical release poster
- Directed by: Sam Peckinpah
- Screenplay by: Gordon Dawson; Sam Peckinpah
- Story by: Frank Kowalski; Sam Peckinpah
- Produced by: Martin Baum
- Starring: Warren Oates; Isela Vega
- Cinematography: Álex Phillips Jr.
- Edited by: Garth Craven; Robbe Roberts; Sergio Ortega; Dennis E. Dolan
- Music by: Jerry Fielding
- Production companies: Optimus Productions; Estudios Churubusco; United Artists
- Distributed by: United Artists
- Release dates: August 7, 1974 (Los Angeles); March 13, 1975 (Mexico)
- Running time: 112 minutes
- Countries: United States; Mexico
- Languages: English; Spanish
- Budget: $1.5 million (estimated)
- Box office: $700,000 (US/Canada rentals)

Bring Me the Head of Alfredo Garcia (Spanish: Tráiganme la cabeza de Alfredo García) is a 1974 neo-Western film co-written and directed by Sam Peckinpah, and starring Warren Oates and Isela Vega, with Robert Webber, Gig Young, Helmut Dantine, Emilio Fernández and Kris Kristofferson in supporting roles. The film is about a down-on-his-luck musician (Oates) who joins a deadly manhunt for the titular character, who is wanted after impregnating the daughter of a crime boss.

Made in Mexico on a low budget after the commercial failure of Pat Garrett and Billy the Kid (1973), Alfredo García was, so Peckinpah claimed, the only one of his films released as he had intended. The film was a critical and commercial failure at the time, but has gained a new following and stature in the decades since.

== Plot ==
Teresa, the pregnant teenage daughter of a powerful Mexican crime lord known only as El Jefe (Spanish for 'The Boss'), is summoned before her father and interrogated as to the identity of her unborn child's father. She identifies the father as Alfredo Garcia, whom El Jefe had been grooming to be his successor. Infuriated, El Jefe offers a $1 million bounty to whoever will "bring me the head of Alfredo Garcia".

The search progresses for two months. In Mexico City, a pair of business suit-clad, dispassionate hitmen, Sappensly and Quill, enter a saloon and encounter Bennie, a retired U.S. Army officer who makes a meagre living as a piano player and bar manager. The men ask about Garcia, believing they will have more luck getting answers out of a fellow American. Bennie plays dumb and claims he doesn't know who Garcia is.

It turns out that everyone in the bar knows who Garcia is; they simply don't know where he is. Bennie goes to meet his girlfriend, Elita, a maid at a ghetto motel. Elita admits to having cheated on Bennie with Garcia, who had professed his love for her, something Bennie refuses to do. Elita tells him that Garcia died in a drunk-driving crash the previous week.

Bennie goes to Sappensly and Quill in the hotel room of the man who hired them, El Jefe's business associate Max, and makes a deal for $10,000 for Garcia's head, plus a $200 advance for expenses. Bennie convinces Elita to go on a road trip with him to visit Garcia's grave, claiming that he only wants proof that Garcia is in fact dead and no longer a threat to their relationship. Bennie proposes to Elita, promising that their future will change and she can retire from her cleaning job. Elita warns Bennie against trying to upset their status quo. While having a picnic, Bennie and Elita are accosted by two bikers who pull guns on the couple. One of the bikers takes Elita aside. He cuts off her shirt, lets her slap him twice, slaps her back, then walks away; she follows and the two kiss. Bennie knocks the second biker unconscious and takes his gun. Finding Elita about to have sex with the first biker, Bennie shoots him dead and then kills the second biker as well.

Bennie confesses to Elita his plan to decapitate Garcia's corpse and sell the head for money. A disgusted Elita begs Bennie to give up this quest and return to Mexico City. Bennie refuses, although he agrees to marry Elita in the church of the town where Garcia is buried. They find Garcia's grave, but when he opens the coffin, Bennie is struck from behind by an unseen assailant and knocked unconscious. He wakes up to find himself half-buried in the grave, and Elita is dead. Garcia's corpse has been decapitated.

Bennie learns from villagers that his assailants are driving a station wagon. He catches up with the men after they blow out a tire. Bennie shoots them, searches their car, and claims Garcia's head. Stopping at a roadside restaurant, he packs the sack containing the head with ice to preserve it for the journey home. Bennie talks to the head as if Garcia were still alive, blaming Alfredo for Elita's death and then conceding that both of them probably loved her equally.

Bennie is ambushed by members of Garcia's family. They reclaim the head and are about to kill Bennie when they are interrupted by the arrival of Sappensly and Quill. Quill produces a sub-machine gun and murders most of the family, but is fatally shot. As Sappensly sorrowfully looks at Quill's corpse, Bennie asks: "Do I get paid?" Sappensly turns to shoot, but Bennie kills him. Bennie returns to Mexico City, "arguing" with Garcia's head all the while.

At his apartment Bennie gives Garcia's head a shower and then brings it to Max's hotel room. Feigning willingness to surrender the head for his $10,000, Bennie reveals he is no longer motivated by money; he says Alfredo was a friend of his and demands to know why Max and the others want his head so badly. He also blames Elita's death on the bounty. Incensed, Bennie starts shooting, killing Max and his henchmen in a short gun battle. He takes a business card from the desk with El Jefe's address on it.

After attending the baptism for his new grandchild, El Jefe greets Bennie as a hero in his hacienda, and gives him a briefcase containing the million-dollar bounty. Bennie calmly relates how many people died for Garcia's head, including his beloved. El Jefe tells Bennie to take his money and throw the head to the pigs on the way out. Infuriated that the object responsible for Elita's death is viewed as nothing more than garbage, Bennie guns down all of El Jefe's bodyguards.

Teresa enters with her newborn son, causing Bennie to hesitate shooting El Jefe. She urges Bennie to kill her father. Bennie obliges and leaves El Jefe's hacienda with Teresa, taking along Garcia's head. They approach the entrance gate and Bennie says goodbye to Teresa, departing the scene with the words: "You take care of the boy. And I'll take care of the father". Bennie drives away, only to be killed by El Jefe's men, their machine guns tearing him to pieces.

== Cast ==
- Warren Oates as Bennie
- Isela Vega as Elita
- Robert Webber as Sappensly
- Gig Young as Johnny Quill
- Helmut Dantine as Max
- Emilio Fernández as "El Jefe"
- Kris Kristofferson as Paco
- Donnie Fritts as John
- Chano Urueta as Bartender
- Jorge Russek as Cueto
- Chalo González as Chalo
- Don Levy as Frank
- Enrique Lucero as Esteban
- Janine Maldonado as Teresa
- Tamara Garina as Mrs. Moreno
- Farnesio de Bernal as Bernardo
- Ahui Camacho as "El Chavito"
- Mónica Miguel as Dolores

Uncredited

- Richard Bright as Barfly
- Edith González as Blonde Child

== Production ==
=== Development ===
Director Sam Peckinpah was working on The Ballad of Cable Hogue when screenwriter and long-time friend Frank Kowalski told him an idea for a film: "I got a great title: 'Bring Me the Head of...,' - and he had some other name - 'and the hook is that the guy is already dead'." Peckinpah loved it, and began writing on it then and also in England while making Straw Dogs. He went on to write the shooting screenplay with Gordon Dawson. Producer Martin Baum had formed his own independent production company, Optimus Productions, and had a deal with United Artists. Peckinpah approached him with 25 pages of the film's script. Baum read it and liked it. United Artists agreed to pay Peckinpah to write the script but he told Baum that he did not want any money for it because he owed him a favor. Peckinpah told Baum that if United Artists liked the script then they could pay him.

=== Pre-production ===
Peckinpah started pre-production in mid-August 1973 in Mexico City. With the exception of a few key people, the crew was entirely Mexicans. He hired director of photography Alex Phillips Jr., one of Mexico's premiere cameramen. They bonded over a dislike for wide-angle lenses, an admiration for zooms and multiple camera setups. Peckinpah told him, "I make very few takes, but I shoot a lot of film because I like to change angles. I shoot with editing in the back of my mind". While scouting locations, he relied extensively on his gut instinct and desire to portray a gritty, realistic vision he had of Mexico. He spent a lot of time searching for the right bar that would be Bennie's workplace. Peckinpah finally discovered a place in the Plaza Garibaldi known as "Tlaque-Paque". He looked around and said, "this is dressed. This is for real". Mexican members of the crew told him that the bar's owner had an infamous reputation and it was rumored that he once killed a woman there, serving very little jail time because he bribed the right people in positions of power.

=== Filming ===
Bring Me the Head of Alfredo Garcia went into production in late September 1973, and Peckinpah was quoted in an October issue of Variety magazine as saying, "For me, Hollywood no longer exists. It's past history. I've decided to stay in Mexico because I believe I can make my pictures with greater freedom from here". This upset the Motion Picture and Television Unions and they openly censured the director for his statement at their National Conference in Detroit. They also threatened Alfredo Garcia with union boycotts upon its release, labeling it a "runaway" production. In his defense, Peckinpah claimed that he was misquoted. Before the film was to be released, the unions relented on their boycott threat.

As principal photography continued into the month of December, the demands—both physical and mental—were taking their toll on the cast and crew. To help relieve the tension, Peckinpah and the producers bought out a local bar and threw a surprise party. Principal photography ended three days before Christmas, and the director took a week off before supervising the editing of the film.

== Reception ==
=== Initial critical response ===
On its release in 1974, Bring Me the Head of Alfredo García was savaged by many critics and bombed at the box office. Nora Sayre of The New York Times wrote that the film started off well but "disentegrates rapidly," explaining: "Without Garcia as a victim, the plot has almost nowhere to go. Therefore, random episodes are slung into the narrative, including one of the silliest near-rape scenes I've ever seen ... But even this gratuitous garbage can't prevent the movie from dragging." Arthur D. Murphy of Variety panned the film as "turgid melodrama at its worst ... Considering the vast carnage, it is a measure of the film's nothing impact that the bloodletting fails to stir much emotional reaction."

Charles Champlin of the Los Angeles Times stated, "For all the violence, the movie is a very, very long two hours. The bodies shot at close quarters crumple in slow motion, but the motion is slow even when it isn't." Michael Sragow of New York magazine called it "a catastrophe so huge that those who once ranked Peckinpah with Hemingway may now invoke Mickey Spillane". Pauline Kael of The New Yorker wrote that the film was a "time-machine foul-up, with modern, airborne killers functioning in the romanticized Mexico of an earlier movie era." John Simon called Bring Me the Head of Alfredo Garcia "a all-out preposterous horror horror, except for a fine performance by Isela Vega and the clever way in which the protagonist is sneaked into our consciousness".

Conversely, Roger Ebert of the Chicago Sun-Times awarded his highest grade of four stars and called it "some kind of bizarre masterpiece," concluding that "'Bring Me the Head of Alfredo Garcia' is Sam Peckinpah making movies flat out, giving us a desperate character he clearly loves, and asking us to somehow see past the horror and the blood to the sad poem he's trying to write about the human condition." Gene Siskel of the Chicago Tribune gave the film three stars out of four and wrote that although Peckinpah's films were noted for their violence, "What Peckinpah does much better, and what distinguishes his film The Ballad of Cable Hogue as his best work, is to portray a lyrical mood between society's outcasts. A hooker and a prospector hook up in 'Cable Hogue,' the pairing of Bennie and Elita in 'Alfredo Garcia' is equally affecting. Peckinpah is also effective in portraying present-day Mexico as a place of wild contrasts; seedy bars and modern airports, peasants in rags and streamlined tour buses."

Gary Arnold of The Washington Post declared, "For better and worse, no other filmmaker on earth could have conjured up this strange, obsessive, uniquely flawed yet uniquely fascinating picture." Tom Milne of The Monthly Film Bulletin wrote, "The hints of Gothic horror and romantic tenderness fitfully apparent in Peckinpah's earlier work here bloom in superb union."

Bring Me the Head of Alfredo Garcia was listed in the 1978 book The Fifty Worst Films of All Time.

=== Later reviews ===
Despite the film's generally harsh reception at the time of release, it has since found a contemporary audience, maintaining a 78% approval rating on Rotten Tomatoes based on 32 reviews, with a weighted average of 7.3/10. The critical consensus reads: "Bring Me the Head of Alfredo Garcia adds a quirky -- but still thoroughly entertaining -- outlier to Sam Peckinpah's pulpy filmography."

== In popular culture ==
=== Films ===
Jim Reardon's animated short film Bring Me the Head of Charlie Brown (1986) parodies both the title and Peckinpah's violent slow-motion style. Similarly, the made-for-TV movie Bring Me the Head of Dobie Gillis (1988), reuniting the cast of the 1960s television sitcom The Many Loves of Dobie Gillis, is titled as such in reference to this film.

Alfredo Garcia is the name of a character (played by Benjamin Bratt) in Demolition Man (1993).

Cinematographer Roger Deakins cited Bring Me the Head of Alfredo Garcia, among other Peckinpah films, as a visual inspiration for No Country for Old Men.

=== Music ===
Several bands have referenced the film and the lead guitarist of the Grateful Dead with compositions entitled, "Bring Me the Head of Jerry Garcia." Archie Brown and the Young Bucks appear to have been first, on an album with that title in 1987. New York City punk group Iron Prostate released a 7" single with the name on Vital Music Records in 1991. Australian punk group Dick Nasty released one on their album, "Heaven's Filling Up" in 2012. Welsh psych-rockers The Keys released theirs on an album with the same title, in 2019.

English space rock band Hawkwind released a 1985 live album entitled Bring Me the Head of Yuri Gagarin, referencing both the film and the famed Soviet cosmonaut.

The Flaming Stars named one of their compilation albums Bring Me the Rest of Alfredo Garcia in 1997.

Industrial rock band Chemlab sampled a shootout scene from the movie on their 1998 album East Side Militia via the opening track "Exile on Mainline".

=== Comic books ===
The title is referenced in 'Badger' volume one, issue four.

=== Radio ===
In the "Film Club" round of the popular long-running BBC Radio 4 panel comedy I'm Sorry I Haven't A Clue, regular reference is made to this film—usually by Graeme Garden—with one or more words changed to satisfy that week's theme of comedy film titles.

=== Others ===
In an out-of-office email reply Ryan Reynolds apologized to "The Head of Alfredo Garcia" after the sale of Aviation American Gin.

In Cyberpunk 2077, a side mission titled "Bring Me the Head of Gustavo Orta" references the title of the film.

Season 6, episode 6 of Gilmore Girls, titled “Welcome to the Dollhouse”, Rory references the film upon receiving a large gift box from Logan. Not yet knowing what’s inside, Rory declares: “Wow, you did it! You brought me the head of Alfredo Garcia.”

== See also ==
- List of American films of 1974
- List of cult films
