= Born Under a Bad Sign (disambiguation) =

Born Under a Bad Sign is a 1967 studio album by Albert King.

Born Under a Bad Sign may also refer to:

- "Born Under a Bad Sign" (song), by Albert King, 1967
- "Born Under a Bad Sign", a season 2 episode of Supernatural

== See also ==
- Born Under a Bad Neon Sign, a 2006 album by the Flaming Stars
