= Tonite... the Singles Bar =

Compilation album by Gallon Drunk
- Released: 1991
- Recorded: 1988–1991
- Genre: Noise rock
- Length: 35:12
- Label: Clawfist
- Producer: Gallon Drunk, Tony Harris

Gallon Drunk chronology
Tonite... the Singles Bar (1991)	You, the Night ... and the Music (1992)

Professional ratings
Review scores
Source	Rating
Allmusic	4.5/5 stars

Tonite... the Singles Bar is a compilation album by Gallon Drunk, released in 1991 through Clawfist. It contains several of the band's early singles dating back to 1988.

== Track listing ==
No.	Title	Writer(s)	Length
1.	"The Last Gasp (Safty)"	Joe Byfield, Nick Coombes, Mike Delanian, James Johnston	4:00
2.	"Rolling Home"	Mike Delanian, James Johnston	2:28
3.	"Snakepit"	Mike Delanian, James Johnston	2:51
4.	"Misirlou"	Traditional arr.	4:43
5.	"Ruby"	Joy May Creasy, Simeon, Danny Taylor	4:39
6.	"Draggin' Along"	Joe Byfield, Nick Coombes, Mike Delanian, James Johnston	3:53
7.	"May the Earth Open Here"	Mike Delanian, James Johnston	3:09
8.	"Please Give Me Something"	Fell	3:08
9.	"The Whirlpool"	Mike Delanian, James Johnston	2:46
10.	"Gallon Drunk"	Joe Byfield, Nick Coombes, Mike Delanian, James Johnston	3:35

2007 remastered CD
No.	Title	Length
11.	"Just One More" (live)	3:59
12.	"Some Fool's Mess" (live)	5:37
13.	"Jake on the Make" (live)	2:24
14.	"Push the Boat Out" (live)	5:08
15.	"Arlington Road" (live)	4:56
16.	"Bedlam" (live)	5:39
17.	"You Should Be Ashamed" (live)	3:48
18.	"Two Wings Mambo" (live)	7:50

== Personnel ==
Gallon Drunk

- Joe Byfield – maracas
- Nick Coombes – drums
- Mike Delanian – bass guitar, drums, maracas
- James Johnston – vocals, guitar, organ

Production and additional personnel

- Gallon Drunk – production, engineering
- Tony Harris – production, engineering
- Geoffrey Perrin – engineering on "Ruby" and "Gallon Drunk"
- Steve Mack – engineering on "The Last Gasp (Safty)"
