= Ellis Sharp =

British writer

Ellis Sharp is an experimental British writer based in London. Known for his often Surrealist style, Sharp's work is often littered with obscure literary and historical references. His works include several collections of short stories, and novels The Dump, Unbelievable Things and Walthamstow Central, all released by Zoilus Press. His work has also been published by Jetstone, New Ventures and Malice Aforethought Press, which was founded by Frank Key and Max Décharné. The dedication of Sharp's Twenty-Twenty reads "In memory of Frank Key" and the book includes reminiscences of Key.

Sharp's influences include Ann Quin, who is referenced in his collection Quin Again and Other Stories (2015). He also has an essay about Quin's last published novel Tripticks in his collection Sharply Critical (2017).

The novel Complicity by Iain Banks is dedicated to Sharp.

Sharp was born and brought up in Sussex, but now lives in London. He is said to shun publicity and has been described as a 'recluse'.

== Publications ==
- The Aleppo Button (1991) – stories
- Lenin's Trousers (1992) – stories
- Engels on Video: A Joint Production (1995) – stories; with Mac Daly
- To Wanstonia (1996) – stories
- The Dump (1998) – novel
- Driving My Baby Back Home (1996) – stories
- Unbelievable Things (2000) – novel
- Aria Fritta (2004) – stories
- Walthamstow Central (2007) – novel
- Dead Iraqis: Selected Short Stories of Ellis Sharp (New Ventures, 2009) – stories
- Intolerable Tongues (2011) – novel
- Quin Again and Other Stories (Jetstone, 2015) – stories
- The Writer in Nicholas Royle (ed), The Best British Short Stories 2013 (Salt, 2013)
- To Wetumpka (2015) – novel
- Lamees Najim (Jetstone, 2015) – novel
- Sharply Critical: Selected Essays and Reviews (Jetstone, 2017)
- The Orwell Girl (2020) – novel
- Neglected Writer (2021) – novel
- What Vronsky Did Next (2021) – novel
- Twenty-Twenty (2021) – journal
- Alice in Venice (2022) – novel
- Full English (2022) – novel
- The Riddle (2022) – novel
- Month of the Drowned Dog (2023) – novel
- Pig Tale (2023) – novel
- Concrete Impressions (2023) – novel
- Night Architecture (2024) – novella, with an essay on Exodus
