= Derek Raymond =

English crime writer (1931–1994)

Robert William Arthur Cook
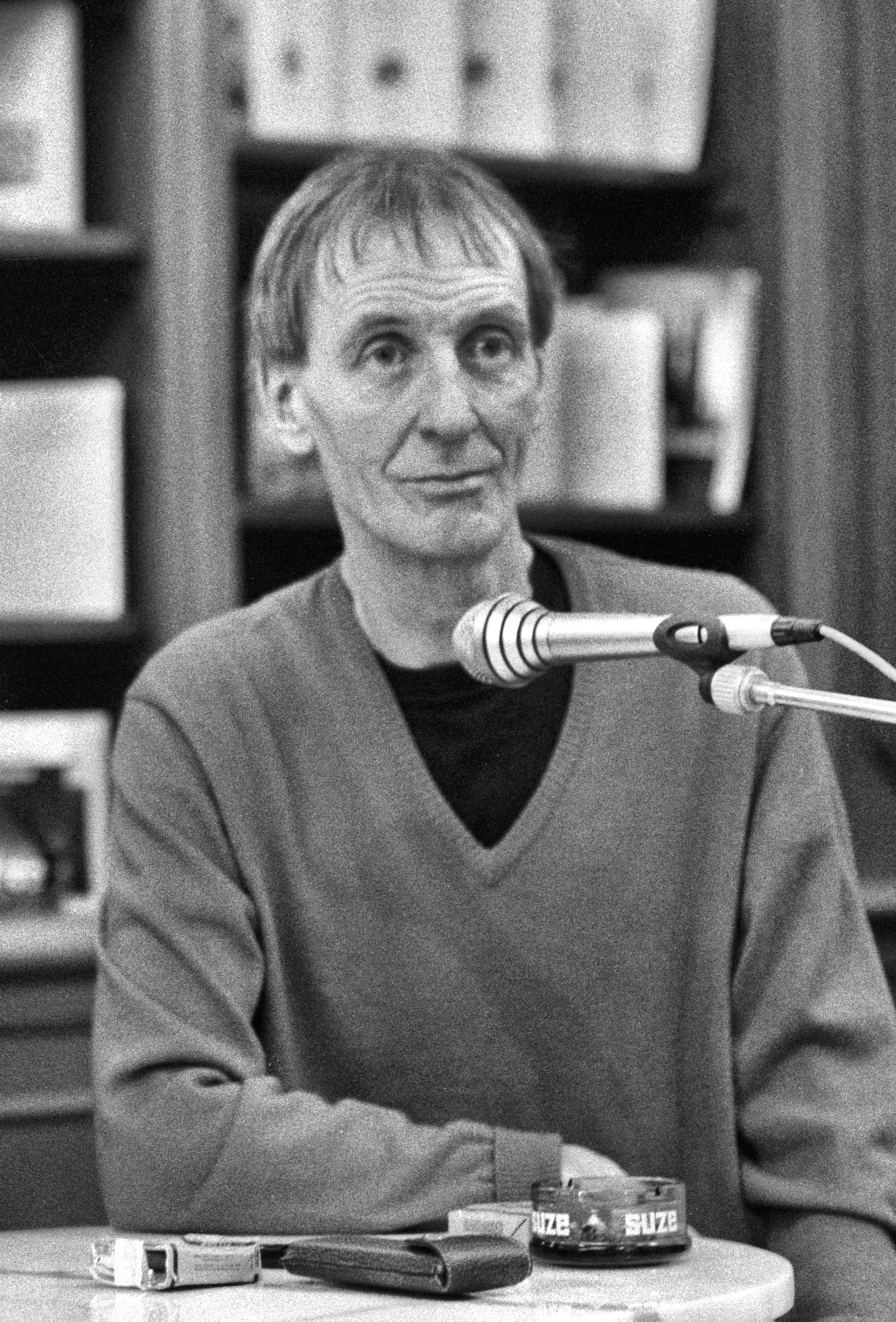
- Raymond in 1991
- Born: 12 June 1931
- Died: 30 July 1994 (aged 63)
- Writing career
- Pen name: Derek Raymond; Robin Cook
- Genres: Noir, crime fiction

Robert William Arthur Cook (12 June 1931 – 30 July 1994), better known since the 1980s by his pen name Derek Raymond, was an English crime writer, credited with being a founder of British noir.

== Early life ==
Cook was born 12 June 1931 in London, as the eldest son of a textile magnate. In 1937, in anticipation of the Second World War, the family retreated to the countryside, to a house near their Kentish castle. In 1944, Cook went to Eton, which he later characterised as a "hotbed of buggery" and "an excellent preparation for vice of any kind". He dropped out at the age of 17.

== Career ==
After Eton, Cook worked as "a front for a gangster's real-estate companies".

"De retour en Angleterre en 1960, Robin Cook accepte d'être l'homme de paille de la mafia locale, dirigée par les frères Krays, dans des entreprises concernant les travaux publics et le bâtiment. Son nom apparaît alors en première page, à propos du vol d'un Rubens."(Returning to England in 1960, Robin Cook agreed to be the local mafia's straw man, run by the Kray brothers, in companies related to public works and construction. His name then appears on the front page, about the theft of a Rubens.) - Encyclopædia Universalis

During his National Service, Cook attained the rank of corporal (latrines). He worked for a brief period selling lingerie in a department store, for the family business, in Neath, Wales. He spent most of the 1950s abroad, in Paris at the Beat Hotel around William Burroughs and Allen Ginsberg, returning to London in 1960, described in his first, semi-autobiographical, novel The Crust on its Uppers (1962), from 1957 on enjoying a long affair with Hazel Whittington the deserted wife of Victor Willing By the early 1970s, "his criminal activities had attracted notice, making it impossible for him to remain safely in the U.K." In 1973, Cook went to the south of France and stayed there for 18 years. Later, he lived in New York on the Lower East Side with junkies and the jazz musicians, marrying an heiress from New England, in Spain in poverty and in jail,

== Personal life ==
Cook's five marriages ended in divorce.

== Novels ==
The Crust on its Uppers (1962) was published under the name Robin Cook (not to be confused with Robin Cook, the American novelist).

=== Black novels ===
Cook published He Died With His Eyes Open (1984) under the pen name of Derek Raymond. He adopted his new pseudonym because he did not want to be confused with the American writer known as Robin Cook, "nor with the bloody shadow minister for health, come to that". In France, his books kept being published under his real name, generating some confusion with the American novelist.

The book inaugurated the Factory series, nominal police procedurals narrated by the unnamed protagonist, a sergeant at London Metropolitan Police’s Department of Unexplained Deaths, also known as A14. A14 handles the crummy lowlife murders, in contrast with attention-grabbing homicides handled by the prestigious Serious Crimes Division, better known as Scotland Yard. It is "by far the most unpopular and shunned branch of the service" (He Died With His Eyes Open, p. 6). As befits his lowly professional standing and departmental affiliation, the detective is surly, sarcastic, and insubordinate. His first case in the series is an inquiry into the murder of one Charles Locksley Alwin Staniland, an unemployed writer aged fifty-one, of upper class breeding but apparently down on his luck. He appears to be making little headway in an investigation that his departmental betters would be expected to treat as trivial. His ensuing relations with authorities proceed along the lines of this conversation with Inspector Bowman:

'Christ, it’s you,’ he said. You still on that Staniland case?'
'Still?' I said. 'I’ve only been on it four days.'
'Four days? You should have had the geezer in half the time. You’ll be working weekends if you don't pull your finger out.'
'Don’t be silly,' I said. 'If you solved them that fast, they’d start stripping you down for the microchips to find out how you did it.'

'How are you getting on with it, anyhow?'
'I can’t get my proof,' I said. 'You know me — slow, quick, quick, slow, Mr. Foxtrot they call me. That's why I’m still a sergeant while you’re shaping up for superintendent on the Vice Squad. All I can say is, when it happens, don't get done for looking at dirty pictures on the taxpayer's time.'
'You really make me laugh, you do,' Bowman said. 'You come out with better jokes than a villain.'

—He Died With His Eyes Open (1984) , p. 146

The detective displays similar manners whilst intimidating villains who pop up as witnesses in his investigation:

'Oh, sorry. Yes, that one. Yes, I get you now.'
'Do you?' I said. 'Lucky for you. Because you could find yourself in a bit of bother if you didn’t look out. I might decide I wanted to wind you right up tight if you misled me, just to see what would happen. And do you know what would happen, fatty? You’d go off pop! Like that.'
'Okay, okay,' he said.
—He Died With His Eyes Open (1984) , p. 33

Such social shortcomings find their counterpart in a nearly psychotic identification with the mutilated bodies of murder victims whom the hero relentlessly avenges. The detective finds Staniland's recorded journals. He listens to the voice of the murder victim ruminate on his sense of being trapped in his body and the possibility of release through death. The tapes convey a poetic diction infected with haunted sensibilities:

The next tape of Staniland’s I played started:

I dreamed I was walking through the door of a cathedral. Someone I couldn’t distinguish warned me: 'Don’t go in there, it’s haunted.' However, I went straight in and glided up the nave to the altar. The roof of the building was too high to see; the quoins were lost in a dark fog through which the votive lamps glowed orange. The only light came through the diamond-shaped clear panes in the windows; it was faint and cold. This neglected mass was attached to a sprawl of vaulted ruins; I had been in them all night; I had wandered through them for centuries. They had once been my home; burned-out rafters jutted like human ribs above empty, freezing galleries, and great doors gave onto suites soaked by pitiless rain. Angry spectres, staggering with the faint steps of the insane, paraded arm in arm through the wrecked masonry, sneering as I passed: ‘The Stanilands have no money? Good! Excellent!'

In the cathedral there were no pews or chairs, just people standing around, waiting. No service was in progress. Knots of men and women from another century stood about, talking in low voices to bishops who moved in and out of the crowd, trailing their tarnished vestments.
I realised with a paralysing horror that the place really was haunted. The people kept looking upwards, as though waiting for an event. I managed to overcome my fear and went on up the nave towards the altar. As I passed, groups of people crossed themselves and said nervously: 'Don't do that!' I took no notice, but opened the gate in the rails and went and stood in front of the altar. Behind it, instead of a reredos, hung a tapestry with a strange, curling design in dark red; the tapestry was so high that it lost itself in the roof. As I watched, it began to undulate, to flow and ripple, gradually and sensuously at first, then more and more ardently, until it was rearing and thundering against the wall like an angry sea. I heard people behind me groan and mutter, praying in their anguish and fear. Then my waist was held by invisible hands and I was raised from the floor; at the height of the roof I was turned slowly parallel with the ground and then released so that I floated, immobile and face downwards, far above the people whose faces I could make out in the half-dark as a grey blur, staring up at me. After I had floated the length and breadth of the building I descended quietly, of my own accord, and landed lightly on the spot from where I had been taken, whereupon I walked directly out of the building without looking back. As I walked swiftly away down a gravel path someone like Barbara came running towards me in a white coat, approaching from a thick hedge that surrounded the graveyard.
'Quick', she said over her shoulder, 'don't let him get out!'
But I walked straight into a wood that confronted me without a qualm; no one had any power over me now.

—He Died With His Eyes Open (1984) , pp. 188–190

The sacred relationship between the dreamer's body and the cathedral finds its immediate complement in the profane preoccupations of his waking life.

The passage that I was listening to now ran:

Unhook the delicate, crazy lace of flesh, detach the heart with a single cut, unmask the tissue behind the skin, unhinge the ribs, disclose the spine, take down the long dress of muscle from the bones where it hangs erect. A pause to boil the knives — then take a bold but cunning curve, sweeping into the skull you had trepanned, into the brain, and extract its art if you can. But you will have blood on your hands unless you transfused it into bottles first, and cure the whole art of the dead you may, but in brine — a dish to fatten you for your own turn.

What better surgeon than a maggot?
What greater passion than a heart in formaldehyde?
Ash drops from the morgue assistant's cigarette into the dead mouth; they will have taken forensic X-rays of the smashed bones before putting him back into the fridge with a bang; there he will wait until the order for burial from the coroner arrives.
Those responsible for the end of his mysterious being will escape or, at best, being proved mad, get a suspended sentence under Section Sixty.

—He Died With His Eyes Open (1984) , pp. 191–192

Earlier on, the detective heard Staniland's detailed account of his participation in the slaughter of a hog, which recapitulates one among many menial occupations of his creator (He Died With His Eyes Open (1984) , pp. 102–103). His systematic inversion of vitality drains his favourite characters of life's essence or its principal characteristics, even as it imbues their environment with ominous animation, after the manner of French Symbolists. Uncharacteristically for a writer of crime fiction, Cook expressly and primarily identifies his authorial persona with the murder victim. Accordingly, his detective plays the part of the difficult reader favoured by the Symbolists. In response to Staniland's taped lesson in forensic pathology, he recalls another underappreciated artist:

I switched the player off and began thinking for no apparent reason about a friend I had once when I was a young man. He was a sculptor who used my local pub in the Fulham Road; his studio was just opposite. He wore sandals but no socks, whatever the weather, and was always powdered with stone dust; this gave him a grey appearance and got under his nails. He wore his white hair long and straight over his ears. He was a Communist, and he didn't care who knew it, though he only said so if people asked. They didn't bother often. He was a Communist as an act of faith, like a Cathar. He accepted the doctrine straight, as Communists used to before they won and everything turned sour. But he rarely spoke to anyone about politics; there were so many other things to talk about. He and I used to stand at the bar together and drink beer and talk about them. But few people talked to him. That suited him. Most people couldn't be bothered because he was stone deaf and could only lip-read you. He was deaf because he had fought for the Republic with the XIIth Brigade in the Spanish war. He had fought at Madrid (University Buildings), and later at Huesca and Teruel with the XVth. But at Teruel he had had both eardrums shattered when a shell exploded too close to him.

'It was worth it.'
'No regrets?'
'No, of course not.'
One of the greatest forms of courage is accepting your fate, and I admired him for living with his affliction without blaming anyone for it. His name was Ransome, and he was sixty-five when I first knew him. He got his old-age pension and no more; governments don't give you any money for fighting in foreign political wars. People like that are treated like nurses – expected to go unseen and unrewarded. So Ransome had to live in a very spare, austere way, living on porridge and crackers, drinking tea, and getting on with his sculpture. It suited him, luckily. He had always lived like that.
Nobody who mattered liked his sculpture; when I went over to his council studio I understood why. His figures reminded me of Ingres crossed with early Henry Moore; they were extraordinarily graceful, and far too honest to mean anything whatever to current trendy taste. There was a quality in them that no artist nowadays can seize any more; they expressed virtues – toughness, idealism, determination – that went out of style with a vanished Britain that I barely remembered. I asked him why, with his talent, he didn't progress to a more modern attitude, but he said it was no use; he was still struggling to represent the essence of what he had experienced in the 1930s. 'What I’m always trying to capture,' he explained, 'is the light, the vision inside a man, and the conviction which that light lends his action, his whole body. Haven't you noticed how the planes of a man's body alter when he's in the grip of a belief? The ex-bank-clerk acquires the stature of an athlete as he throws a grenade – or, it might be, I recollect the instant where an infantryman in an attack, a worker with a rifle, is stopped by a bullet: I try to reconstruct in stone the tragedy of a free man passing from life to death, from will to nothingness: I try to capture the second in which he disintegrates. It’s an objective that won't let me go,' he said, 'and I don’t want it to.' He had been full of promise before he went to Spain; he grubbed about and found me some of his old press-cuttings. In one of them he was quoted as saying: 'A sculptor’s task is to convey the meaning of his time in terms of its over-riding idea. If he doesn’t transmit the idea he’s worth nothing, no matter how much fame he acquires or money he makes. The idea is everything.'

—He Died With His Eyes Open (1984) , pp. 192–194

The conventional detective hero of American noir fiction exemplified toughness, idealism, and determination in his private pursuit of justice unattainable by official means. Stripped of idealism by postwar disillusionment, his English counterpart transmutes his toughness and determination into an obsessive pursuit of an inexorable existential conundrum. The victimised pretext of this pursuit was readily identifiable with the implied author of the narrative in his physiological and metaphysical anguish. In his definitive statement of literary convictions, Cook postulated that the black novel "describes men and women whom circumstances have pushed too far, people whom existence has bent and deformed. It deals with the question of turning a small, frightened battle with oneself into a much greater struggle – the universal human struggle against the general contract, whose terms are unfillable, and where defeat is certain." (The Hidden Files) By the general contract, the writer understood human life at its most exigent. The idea was everything.

Cook's first black novel soon made Cook's name in France. It was filmed as He Died with His Eyes Open (On ne meurt que 2 fois, 1985), with Charlotte Rampling and Michel Serrault in the lead roles. His following black novel, The Devil's Home On Leave (1985), featured an informer turning up in five up-market supermarket bags as boiled meat, and provided greater insight into the motives of its unnamed protagonist. It was filmed in France as Les Mois d’avril sont meurtriers (1987). In Cook's novel How the Dead Live (1986), its detective sent away from London to a remote village called Thornhill, looking into the disappearance of a local doctor's wife and gleaning unique insights into consensual justification of homicide. Cook, in his trademark black jeans, black leather jacket and black beret, became a star act on the Continental literary circuit. When his Factory novels were reprinted in paperback in the late 1980s, Derek Raymond began to gather momentum in the English-speaking world.

=== I Was Dora Suarez ===
Cook's career peaked following the 1990 publication of what many consider his best – and most repulsive – work: the tortured, redemptive tale of a masochistic serial killer, I Was Dora Suarez. As the fourth novel in the Factory series opens, a young prostitute named Dora Suarez is dismembered with an axe. The killer then crushes the head of her friend, an 86-year-old widow. On the same night, a mile away in the West End, a shotgun severs the top off the head of Felix Roatta, part-owner of the seedy Parallel Club. As the detective obsesses with the young woman whose murder he investigates, he discovers that her death is even more bizarre than he had suspected: the murderer was a cannibal who consumed flesh from Suarez's corpse and ejaculated against her thigh. Autopsy results accrue the revulsion as they compound the puzzle: Suarez was dying of AIDS, but the pathologist is unable to determine how she had contracted HIV. Then a photo, supplied by a former Parallel hostess, links Suarez to Roatta, and inquiries at the nightclub reveal her vile and inhuman exploitation.

To Cook's delight, the ensuing novel caused Dan Franklin, who had become publisher at the company which had issued the earlier three Factory novels, to proclaim the book had made him feel sick. As a result of this reader response, Secker & Warburg the publisher declined to make an offer, and his new agent, writer Maxim Jakubowski offered the book elsewhere and it was quickly acquired by Scribner who took over the publishing of his books until his death. Writing for The New York Times, Marilyn Stasio proclaimed: “Everything about I Was Dora Suarez […] shrieks of the joy and pain of going too far." Filmmaker Chris Petit described it in The Times as "a book full of coagulating disgust and compassion for the world's contamination, disease and mutilation, all dwelt on with a feverish, metaphysical intensity that recalls Donne and the Jacobeans more than any of Raymond's contemporaries." Showing up its surfeit of intestinal fortitude, the French government named its author a Chevalier of Arts and Letters in 1991.

Cook believed I Was Dora Suarez was his greatest and most onerous achievement: "Writing Suarez broke me; I see that now. I don’t mean that it broke me physically or mentally, although it came near to doing both. But it changed me; it separated out for ever what was living and what was dead. I realised it was doing so at the time, but not fully, and not how, and not at once. […] I asked for it, though. If you go down into the darkness, you must expect it to leave traces on you coming up – if you do come up. It's like working in a mine; you hope that hands you can't see know what they’re doing and will pull you through. I know I wondered half way through Suarez if I would get through – I mean, if my reason would get through. For the trouble with an experience like Suarez is that you become what you’re writing, passing like Alice through the language into the situation." (The Hidden Files, pp. 132–133.)

=== Endgame ===
Following the amicable break-up of his fifth marriage to Agnès, Cook returned to Britain in 1991. The publication of his literary memoir The Hidden Files (1992) precipitated numerous interviews. The Cardinal and the Corpse, a film made for Channel 4 by Chris Petit and Iain Sinclair, about the search for a possibly non-existent rare book, featured Cook as himself, reunited with such 1960s "morries" (his term for notable characters) as Jewish anarchist writer Emanuel Litvinoff and Tony Lambrianou, an ex-convict corpse disposer for the Krays and alumnus of Mosleyite Jew-baiting. Derek Raymond's fifth novel in the Factory series, Dead Man Upright, was brought out by Time Warner in 1993, regrettably failing to sustain the momentum of the preceding entries. But its author demonstrated his versatile capacity by playing a sell-out gig at the National Film Theatre on the South Bank in the company of indie rock band Gallon Drunk, with whom he recorded a musical interpretation of I Was Dora Suarez.

Cook died peacefully at the age of 63. His cause of death was given as cancer. His literary executor is John Williams and Maxim Jakubowski became the executor of his estate. Derek Raymond's final novel, Not Till the Red Fog Rises, appeared posthumously in 1994. It served up a perverse and funny apotheosis of its protagonist Gust, on parole after serving 10 years for armed robbery. In a review published in The Observer, Jane McLoughlin compared the quality of its writing to that of Graham Greene, Eric Ambler, and Joseph Conrad. A BBC drama series based on the Factory novels and to be produced by Kenith Trodd, plus a third French film adaptation of How the Dead Live, directed by Claude Chabrol and starring Philippe Noiret, were rumoured to be in the works, but never materialised. The first four Factory novels were reissued by Serpent’s Tail starting in early 2006, and by Melville House in the United States in 2011.

Ken Bruen frequently incorporates tributes to Derek Raymond into his hard-boiled fiction.

Rob Humphreys includes this listing in The Rough Guide to London, Rough Guides, 2003, pp. 663–664:

Derek Raymond, Not till the Red Fog Rises (Warner, UK). A book which "reeks with the pervasive stench of excrement" as Iain Sinclair […] put it, this is a lowlife spectacular set in the seediest sections of the capital.

== Works ==
- The Crust on Its Uppers, 1962, originally published under the name of Robin Cook, reprinted by Serpent's Tail, 2000
- Bombe Surprise, Hutchinson, 1963, originally published under the name of Robin Cook
- A State of Denmark, c. 1964, originally published under the name of Robin Cook, reprinted by Serpent's Tail, 1994
- The Legacy of the Stiff Upper Lip, originally published under the name of Robin Cook, 1966
- Public Parts and Private Places, 1967, originally published under the name of Robin Cook, U.S. title Private Parts in Public Places, 1969
- The Tenants of Dirt Street, originally published under the name of Robin Cook, 1971
- Le Soleil qui s’éteint, Gallimard, 1982; translation by Rosine Fitzgerald, of Sick Transit, which remains unpublished
- Nightmare in the Street (1988), Serpent's Tail, 2006
- Cauchemar dans la rue, Rivages, 1988, translation by Jean-Paul Gratias, of Nightmare in the Street, first chapter adapted under the same title in Mike Ripley and Maxim Jakubowski (editors), Fresh Blood, Do-Not Press, 1996
- Every Day Is a Day in August, in Maxim Jakubowski (editor), New Crimes, Constable Robinson, 1989
- Hidden Files, Little, Brown, 1992, an essay of episodic memoirs, excerpted correspondence, and emphatic literary principle
- Changeless Susan, in Maxim Jakubowski (editor), More Murders for the Fireside, Pan, 1994
- Not Till the Red Fog Rises, Time Warner Books UK, 1994, excerpt adapted as Brand New Dead in Maxim Jakubowski (editor), London Noir, Serpent's Tail, 1995

=== The "Factory" series ===
- He Died with His Eyes Open, Secker & Warburg, 1984, the first book in the Factory series
- The Devil's Home on Leave, Secker & Warburg, 1985, the second book in the Factory series
- How the Dead Live, Secker & Warburg, 1986, the third book in the Factory series
- I Was Dora Suarez, Scribner, 1990, the fourth book in the Factory series
- Dead Man Upright, Time Warner Books UK, 1993, the fifth book in the Factory series

== Discography ==
- Dora Suarez, Clawfist, 1993, Derek Raymond (Robin Cook) reads from his novel with background music by James Johnston and Terry Edwards (from the band Gallon Drunk)
