= You, the Night ... and the Music =

Studio album by Gallon Drunk
- Released: 1992
- Recorded: Autumn 1991, London, England
- Genre: Rock
- Length: 31:58
- Label: Clawfist
- Producers: Gallon Drunk, Tony Harris

Gallon Drunk chronology
Tonite... the Singles Bar (1991)	You, the Night ... and the Music (1992)	Clawfist - The Peel Sessions (1992)

You, the Night ... and the Music is the debut album by the English band Gallon Drunk. It was released in 1992 through Clawfist. The album was produced by the band and Tony Harris.

== Critical reception ==
Professional ratings
Review scores
Source	Rating
AllMusic	4/5 stars
MusicHound Rock: The Essential Album Guide	3/5 stars
The Virgin Encyclopedia of Nineties Music	2/5 stars

Trouser Press wrote: "The band has developed its melodic side; many of the songs are draped in [James] Johnston's dark piano playing. But the brimstone igniting the songs remains firmly on high."

== Track listing ==
No.	Title	Writer(s)	Length
1.	"Rev Up – TPA"	Mike Delanian, James Johnston	0:52
2.	"Some Fool's Mess"	Joe Byfield, Max Décharné, Mike Delanian, James Johnston	5:02
3.	"Just One More"	James Johnston	3:55
4.	"Two Wings Mambo"	Mike Delanian, James Johnston	6:39
5.	"You, the Night ... and the Music"	Max Décharné, Mike Delanian, James Johnston	2:21
6.	"Gallon Drunk"	Joe Byfield, Nick Combe, Mike Delanian, James Johnston	3:38
7.	"Night Tide"	Mike Delanian, James Johnston	2:27
8.	"Eye of the Storm"	Mike Delanian, James Johnston	1:56
9.	"The Tornado"	Mike Delanian, James Johnston	5:08

2007 remastered CD
No.	Title	Writer(s)	Length
10.	"Ruby" (alternate take)	Joy May Creasy, Simeon, Danny Taylor	4:07
11.	"Draggin' Along" (Steven Stapleton mix)	Joe Byfield, Nick Coombes, Mike Delanian, James Johnston	3:54
12.	"All Mouth, No Trousers" (unreleased demo)		2:41
13.	"Arlington Road" (live)	Joe Byfield, Max Décharné, Mike Delanian, James Johnston	4:55
14.	"You Should Be Ashamed" (live)	James Johnston, Geraldine Swayne	3:24
15.	"Push the Boat Out" (live)	James Johnston	4:49
16.	"Two Wings Mambo" (live)	Mike Delanian, James Johnston	9:03

== Personnel ==
Gallon Drunk

- Joe Byfield – maracas
- Max Décharné – drums
- Mike Delanian – bass guitar
- James Johnston – vocals, guitar, organ

Production and additional personnel

- Gallon Drunk – production
- Tony Harris – production, engineering
