= A Walk on the Wired Side =

Studio album by The Flaming Stars
- Released: 13 March 2001
- Recorded: 5–20 August 2000
- Genre: Garage punk, indie rock
- Label: UK – Vinyl Japan; US – Alternative Tentacles

The Flaming Stars chronology
Pathway (1999)	A Walk on the Wired Side (2001)	Sunset & Void (2002)

Professional ratings
Review scores
Source	Rating
Allmusic	4/5 stars

A Walk on the Wired Side is the fourth studio album by The Flaming Stars. This album is different from the previous albums because more members of the band, besides Max (the primary songwriter), had contributed more towards song writing. Also, the Flaming Stars borrowed less from artists like Nick Cave and instead began to create their own style in the underground music scene.

== Track listing ==
1. "Right Face Right Time – 3:08
2. "You Don't Always Want What You Get – 4:01
3. "Grabber George – 3:04
4. "Absent Without Leave – 2:51
5. "Action, Crime and Vision – 2:45
6. "Some Things You Don't Forget – 3:12
7. "She Says She Says – 2:59
8. "The Villain – 2:05
9. "Out of the Past – 2:38
10. "Over and Done – 3:09
11. "Meet the Guvnor – 2:54
12. "Leaving Town – 2:00
13. "Sleepless Nights – 3:19
14. "The Dead Don't Care – 3:16
15. "More Than Enough – 2:32
16. "Tinnitus Blues – 2:24
17. "Another Shade of Blue – 3:24
18. "Swimming the Length of This Bar – 2:38
