= Black Milk (disambiguation) =

Black Milk is an American hip hop musician.

Black Milk may also refer to:

- Black Milk (Beasts of Bourbon album), 1990
- Black Milk (Gallon Drunk album), 1999
- "Black Milk", a song by Massive Attack from Mezzanine
- Black Milk (film), a 2020 film directed by Uisenma Borchu
