= Black Milk (Gallon Drunk album) =

Studio album by Gallon Drunk
- Released: 1999
- Recorded: Astra, Athens, Greece
- Genre: Rock
- Length: 61:19
- Label: Self Distribuzione

Gallon Drunk chronology
In the Long Still Night (1996)	Black Milk (1999)	Fire Music (2002)

Professional ratings
Review scores
Source	Rating
AllMusic	4/5 stars
The Encyclopedia of Popular Music	3/5 stars

Black Milk is an album by Gallon Drunk. It was released in 1999 through Self Distribuzione. The album served as the soundtrack for the Greek film of the same name.

== Track listing ==
No.	Title	Length
1.	"Theme from Black Milk"	7:31
2.	"Hurricane" (new version)	4:08
3.	"Every Second of Time"	5:56
4.	"Blood Is Red"	5:40
5.	"The Funeral"	2:03
6.	"Can You Feel It"	6:18
7.	"Now and Forever"	4:18
8.	"At My Side"	5:06
9.	"Prostitute"	3:05
10.	"Hypnotised"	3:35
11.	"Every Second of Time" (moog instrumental version)	5:56
12.	"One More Time"	4:10
13.	"Lament"	3:33

== Personnel ==
Gallon Drunk

- Jeremy Cottingham – bass guitar
- Terry Edwards – saxophone, trumpet, keyboards on "Hurricane"
- James Johnston – vocals, guitar, banjo, bass guitar, keyboards, organ, Moog synthesizer, vibraphone, harmonica
- Ian White – drums

Production and additional personnel

- Gallon Drunk – engineering, recording
- Pauline Michailidis – backing vocals on "Theme from Black Milk", "Every Second of Time" and "At My Side"
- Tony Papamichael – engineering, recording
