= I Was Dora Suarez =

1990 novel by Derek Raymond

- First edition
- Author: Derek Raymond
- Cover artist: Christopher King
- Language: English
- Genre: Detective novel
- Publisher: Scribners
- Publication date: 1990
- Publication place: UK
- Pages: 202
- ISBN: 978-1-935554-60-8

I was Dora Suarez, published in 1990, is a detective novel by Derek Raymond. It is the fourth book in the Factory series, following He Died with His Eyes Open, The Devil's Home on Leave, and How the Dead Live.

== Criticism ==
Cook's notoriety crested following the 1990 publication of what many consider his best – and most repulsive – work: the tortured, redemptive tale of a masochistic serial killer, I Was Dora Suarez. To Cook's delight, the ensuing novel caused Dan Franklin, the publisher of its three predecessors, to vomit over his desk. As a result of this reader response, Secker & Warburg told the author to take his nauseating wares elsewhere. Scribner took over the fourth novel in the factory series. Writing for The New York Times Book Review, Marilyn Stasio proclaimed, "Everything about I Was Dora Suarez...shrieks of the joy and pain of going too far." Filmmaker Chris Petit described it in The Times as "a book full of coagulating disgust and compassion for the world's contamination, disease and mutilation, all dwelt on with a feverish, metaphysical intensity that recalls Donne and the Jacobeans more than any of Raymond's contemporaries."

A review in Publishers Weekly described it as a "nightmarish and compelling tale".

== Adaptations ==
Robin Cook read some excerpts of his novels in a live performance with background music by the alternative rock band Gallon Drunk.
