= Gallon Drunk =

English alternative rock band formed in London in 1988

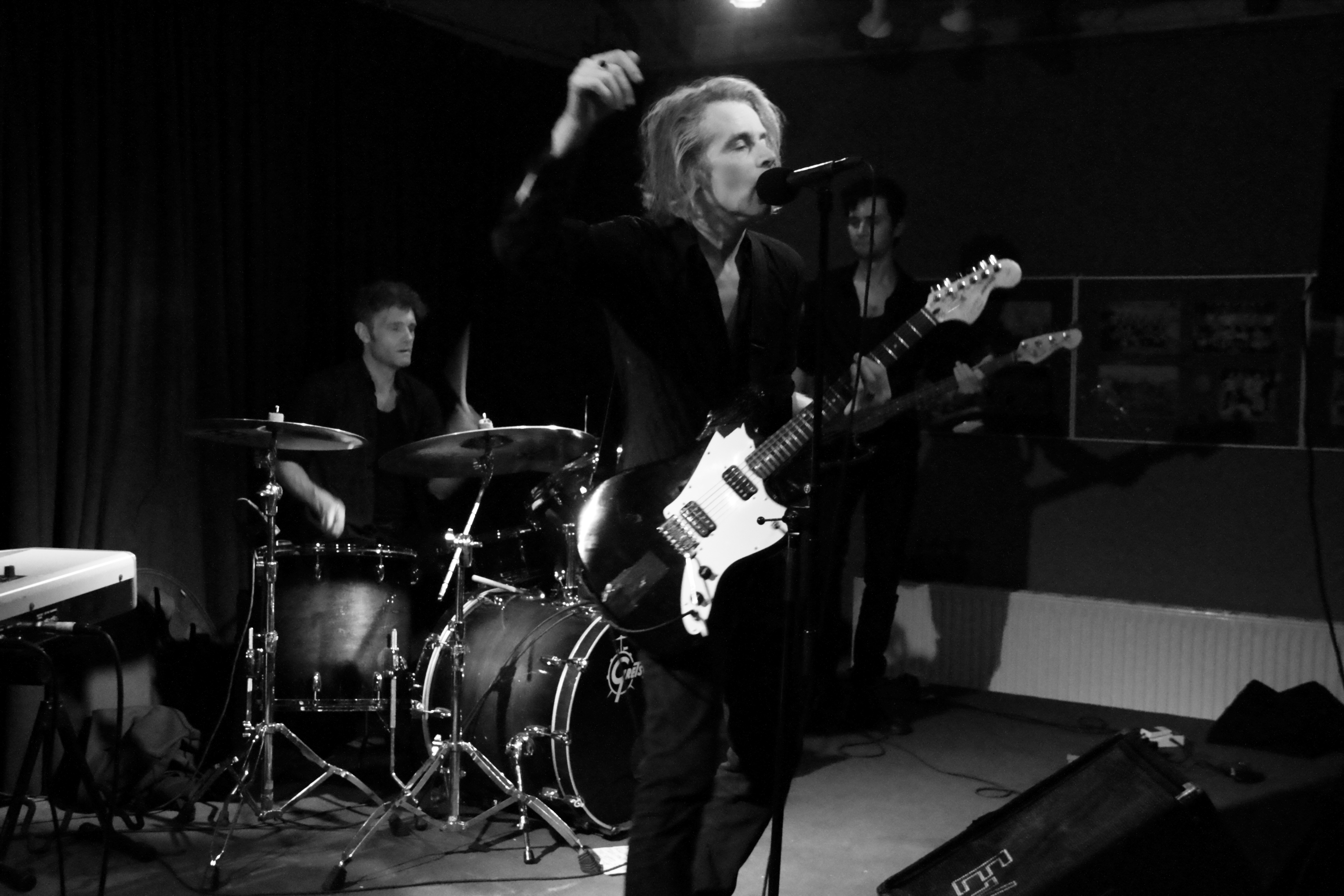
- Gallon Drunk at Club W71, Weikersheim (2014)

Background information
- Origin: London, England
- Genres: Alternative rock, post-punk, punk blues
- Years active: 1988–present
- Labels: Clawfist, Sire, City Slang, Fred, Clouds Hill
- Members: James Johnston; Terry Edwards; Ian White; Leo Kurunis
- Past members: Mike Delanian; Nick Coombe; Gary Bonneface; Max Décharné; Joe Byfield; Ray Dickaty; Simon Wring; Jeremy Cottingham
- Website: www.gallondrunk.com

Gallon Drunk were an English alternative rock band formed in London in 1988. Their sound contains a variety of influences, from noise to blues and jazz, and is noted for its dark subject matter.

== Biography ==
The band formed in 1988 with an initial lineup of James Johnston (vocals, guitar, keyboards) and Mike Delanian (bass), who by 1990 had recruited Nick Combe (drums).

After debut single "Snakepit" the band signed to the Clawfist label, releasing the "Ruby" single in late 1990 (a cover of the song by New York band The Silver Apples) with Nick Combe on drums and Joe Byfield on maracas. The band released three singles in 1991, one of which ("Some Fool's Mess") was named 'Single of the Week' by the NME, by which point Combe had been replaced by Max Décharné. The band's debut album, You, the Night...and the Music, was released in 1992, with a US release on Rykodisc.

The following year they enjoyed popularity in the wake of their second album, the Mercury Prize-nominated From The Heart of Town, which saw the band sign to Sire Records and play venues in the U.S., such as the Hollywood Bowl and Madison Square Garden in New York, as a guest of Morrissey. During UK dates for From The Heart of Town saxophonist/keyboard player Terry Edwards joined the band, having played previously as a session player on the album. Following the subsequent European and U.S. tours, both as headline, and also supporting PJ Harvey, drummer Max Décharné left the band (later fronting The Flaming Stars), to be replaced by Ian White in 1993, who remains a member of the band to the present.

The new line-up of the band followed with The Traitor's Gate E.P. (1995) and in 1996 the acclaimed In The Long Still Night (now signed to City Slang). The "To Love Somebody" single, released in March 1997 was the band's last release before dissolving for almost three years.

The band returned in 2000 with the Blood Is Red EP, with Jeremy Cottingham having replaced Mike Delanian on bass. The band's soundtrack to Nicholas Triandafyllidis's 1999 film Black Milk followed in March. In 2002 they released the album Fire Music.

Following a hiatus during which Johnston toured and recorded as a full-time member of Nick Cave and the Bad Seeds, Gallon Drunk returned in 2007 with The Rotten Mile, with Simon Wring taking over on bass, and the remaining core members of Johnston, White and Edwards. A live album, Live at Klub 007, was released in 2008.

After Simon Wring's death in 2011, the band recorded The Road Gets Darker From Here (released in 2012) in Hamburg's leading analogue studio Clouds Hill. The subsequent tours for the album saw Leo Kurunis join the band on bass guitar, with this line-up then returning to Clouds Hill to record The Soul of the Hour, which was released in March 2014 on Clouds Hill Recordings.

Original founding member Nick Combe died in 2015. Combe had played and recorded with The Scientists prior to joining Gallon Drunk, also making the video for Human Jukebox, from the Scientists E.P. of the same name.

=== Side projects ===
In 1993, Johnston and Edwards collaborated with writer Derek Raymond on the Dora Suarez album and associated multimedia performance at the National Film Theatre the following year, based on Raymond's novel I Was Dora Suarez.

Founder, frontman and sole consistent member James Johnston has also played in Nick Cave and the Bad Seeds, with whom he joined for a Lollapalooza tour in 1994 before serving as a full-time member from 2003 to 2008, and a member of psychedelic rock band Faust from 2006 to 2012.

Johnston and White are also currently members of Big Sexy Noise with Lydia Lunch. Johnston, White and Edwards had previously worked with Lunch in live shows.

In early 2015 Johnston and Edwards recorded with PJ Harvey at Somerset House for her album The Hope Six Demolition Project which was released in 2016. They went on to join the touring 10-piece band in support of the record throughout 2017.

James Johnston's solo album The Starless Room was released through Clouds Hill Recordings in November 2016. The album features contributions from Gallon Drunk drummer Ian White.

== Musical style ==
The band's sound was described by Robert Hanks in The Independent as "dark, bluesy, grinding noise characterised by dense textures, low, mumbling bass guitar and keyboards, and liberal applications of whammy bar to the electric guitar, the whole thing oddly underpinned by maracas".

== Members ==
=== Current ===
- James Johnston – vocals, guitar, keyboards
- Terry Edwards – saxophone, keyboards, guitar
- Ian White – drums
- Leo Kurunis – bass guitar

=== Past ===
- Max Décharné – drums
- Joe Byfield – maracas
- Mike Delanian – bass guitar
- Jeremy Cottingham – bass guitar
- Simon Wring – bass guitar
- Nick Combe – drums
- Gary Bonneyface – maracas
- Ray Dickaty – saxophone

== Discography ==
=== Studio albums ===
- You, the Night ... and the Music (1992), Clawfist/Rykodisc
- From the Heart of Town (1993), Clawfist/Sire (UK No. 67)
- In the Long Still Night (1996), City Slang
- Black Milk (1999), FM
- Fire Music (2002), Sweet Nothing
- The Rotten Mile (2007), Fred Ltd.
- The Road Gets Darker from Here (2012), Clouds Hill
- The Soul Of The Hour (2014), Clouds Hill

=== Compilations etc. ===
- Tonite... the Singles Bar (1991), Clawfist/Rykodisc
- Clawfist - The Peel Sessions (1992), Strange Fruit/Dutch East India (split with Breed)
- Dora Suarez (1993), Clawfist
- Bear Me Away: An Anthology of Rare Recordings 1992-2002 (2003), Sweet Nothing
- Live At Klub 007 (2008), Sartorial – live album recorded on 12 March 2008 in Prague at klub 007 by the crew of the Prague independent radio station Radio 1

=== Singles/EPs ===
- "Snakepit" (1988), Gallon Drunk
- "Ruby" (1990), Clawfist
- "Draggin' Along" (1991), Clawfist
- "The Last Gasp" (1991), Clawfist
- "Some Fool's Mess" (1991), Clawfist
- "Bedlam" (1992), Clawfist
- Live at the Madison Square Gardens, 18 September 1992 (1992), Clawfist (Limited Promo)
- "You Should Be Ashamed" (1993), Clawfist
- Savage Soundtracks for Swinging Lovers EP (1993), Blue Eyed Dog (with Barry Adamson)
- Traitor's Gate EP (1995), Gallon Drunk
- "Two Clear Eyes" (1996), City Slang
- "To Love Somebody" (1997), City Slang
- "Hurricane" (1998), Itchy Teeth (12"/CDS released under the name J.J. Stone, featuring Johnson, White, and Edwards)
- "Blood Is Red" (2000), FM
- "Things Will Change" (2001), Sweet Nothing
- "Grand Union Canal" (2007), Fred Label
- "Bad Servant" (2008), Fred Label
- "You Made Me" (2012), Clouds Hill
- "A Thousand Years" (2012), Clouds Hill
- Live at Clouds Hill EP (2013), Clouds Hill
- "The Dumb Room" (2014), Clouds Hill

=== Videos ===
- One For The Ladies (live) (1992), Cherry Red
