= Yeah Jazz =

English rock band

Yeah Jazz were an English rock band from Uttoxeter, Staffordshire, formed in 1983.

== History ==
The band formed in 1983 with a line-up of Kevin Hand (vocals), Mark "Chats" Chatfield (guitar), Stu Ballantyne (bass guitar), and Ian Hitchens (drums). Their debut releases was a cassette EP, Julie and the Sea Lions, in 1984, and over the next two years they developed a more folk-oriented sound, before their next release, "This Is Not Love" in 1986, which featured Frank Sweeney of The June Brides on violin.

After a pair of further singles, Yeah Jazz signed to Cherry Red Records, and added Terry Edwards for their debut single for the label, "Sharon", in 1987. This was followed in April 1988 by the band's debut album, Six Lane Ends. This was published only in LP and tape forms in the UK and on CD in Japan only with the bonus track "This is Not Love - Live". The group split up in 1989, but reformed in 1991.

Their second album, Short Stories, was released initially on cassette only. This was later released under the name Big Red Kite, with a slightly different track listing (towards the end of the life of the band, a deal was struck with the German label Scout to put out the Short Stories CD. However, as some music fans were confused by the "jazz" in title, the band became "Big Red Kite"). A CD single was released from the album entitled "April". The April EP came out on Tubecroft Records in 1992, and also included "Rainbows" and live favourite "Lorraine & Duane". The line-up of the band at this point was Kev Hand (guitar/vocals), Chats (guitar), Stu (bass), Dave Blant (accordion / keyboards/back vocs) and Fred Hopwood (drums/whistle/harmonica). It was recorded at AbbeySound Studios in Rugeley, Staffordshire and produced by Lee Beddow.

A final CD rounding up other tracks, including the song "Rain Of Crystal Spires" for a "Felt" tribute album, was released under the name of Songs From Biscuit Town (a reference to Uttoxeter's own Elkes biscuit factory) and was basically a round up of all their previously unreleased on CD tracks; although a couple were missed of namely "Times Change" and "Brown Eyes Show More Feeling", which were originally featured on the Short Stories cassette. The version of "Thinking About You" is from a BBC radio session recorded at Pebble Mill, instead of the one which appeared on the Short Stories cassette.

Both Short Stories and Songs From Biscuit Town are still available through Smalltown Records, run by Fred Hopwood and Dave Blant. They still perform and record under various monikers based on The Vice Bishops Of Uttoxeter and their last CD included a track written by Kev Hand called "Heaven's Gate".

Hand has recently led the band "Radio Mary". and more recently "Radio Murphy" ( covering classic Irish numbers) but continues to write new songs, performing in small acoustic settings, and has recently brought Yeah Jazz back together to perform at selective venues

== Discography ==
=== Albums ===
- Six Lane Ends (1988) Cherry Red
1. "Sharon"
2. "Stones"
3. "Lee Marvin"
4. "All of My Days"
5. "Freeland"
6. "Step into the Light"
7. "Heaven"
8. "The Girl the Years Were Kind to"
9. "Dirty Windows"
10. "Make a Fist"
11. "Stranger Than Fiction"
12. "All the Stars"
13. "This is Not Love" (bonus track Japanese CD only)
- Short Stories (1996) Scout (released under the Big Red Kite name)
1. "Hey Tray"
2. "April"
3. "Cathy Smiles"
4. "Distant Trains"
5. "Don't Let Me Leave"
6. "Speak Soft"
7. "Rainbows"
8. "Orchids Bloom"
9. "Home"
10. "Polka"
11. "Brown Eyes"
- Songs From Biscuit Town (2001) Smalltown label
1. "Billy Comes of Age"
2. "The Great Escape"
3. "Thinking About You"
4. "Rain of Crystal Spires"
5. "Martha"
6. "Our Time Will Come"
7. "Michael Forgive Me"
8. "Song From an Imaginary Film"
9. "The Ballad of Lorraine and Duane"

* 30 Years (2016) Firestation Records Germany

19 track compilation Ltd edition CD and vinyl

* Short Stories (2022) Ltd.Edition CD Smalltown label

Remastered with bonus tracks (see external links below)

=== Singles ===
- Julie and the Sea Lions 7-inch EP (1984) Distinctive
- This Is Not Love 12-inch EP (1986) Upright
- "She Said" (1986) Upright (UK Indie No. 34)
- "Sharon" (1987) Cherry Red
- "Morning O'Grady" (1988) Cherry Red
- April EP (1993) Native
