= The Six John Peel Sessions =

Compilation album by The Flaming Stars
- Released: 2000
- Genre: Garage punk, indie rock
- Label: Vinyl Japan
- Producer: BBC

Professional ratings
Review scores
Source	Rating
AllMusic	4/5 stars

The Six John Peel Sessions is a 2-CD compilation album by The Flaming Stars. They went on to do a 7th Session after this was released. John Peel himself provided some sleeve notes. The album is dedicated to Ian Dury, who had recently died. As per usual for these Sessions, the versions are of course live in the BBC studios and thus different from any of the source albums and singles.

== Track listing ==
=== Session 1 (7/9/95) ===
1. "Kiss Tomorrow Goodbye"
2. "The Face on the Bar Room Floor"
3. "Broken Heart"
4. "Like Trash"
5. "Tub's Twist"

=== Session 2 (20/4/96) ===
1. "Forget My Name"
2. "Downhill Without Brakes"
3. "Who's Out There?"
4. "Back of my Mind"
5. "3AM on the Bar Room Floor"

=== Session 3 (19/3/97) ===
1. "Bury My Heart at Pier 13"
2. "Just Too Bad"
3. "Sweet Smell of Success"
4. "London After Midnight"

=== Session 4 (21/10/97) ===
1. "Better Than That"
2. "Blood Money"
3. "The Street That Never Closes"
4. "New Hope for the Dead"

=== Session 5 (28/7/98) ===
1. "Only Tonight"
2. "Running Out of Time"
3. "Sing Sing"
4. "Just How it Feels"

=== Session 6 (20/6/99) ===
1. "Lit Up Like a Christmas Tree"
2. "Breaking Down"
3. "What Do I Get?"
4. "Coffin Ed and Grave Digger Jones"
5. "The Last Picture Show"
