= Sunset & Void =

Studio album by The Flaming Stars
- Released: 1 October 2002
- Recorded: January – April 2002
- Genre: Garage punk, indie rock
- Length: 50:51
- Label: UK – Vinyl Japan; US – Alternative Tentacles

Professional ratings
Review scores
Source	Rating
Allmusic	4/5 stars

Sunset & Void is the fifth studio album by the garage punk band The Flaming Stars. This album is known for its brooding noir feel. It features the smooth piano playing by The Flaming Stars' lead singer, Max Décharné and makes extensive use of maracas, organ, harpsichord, marimba, and hand-clapping. The first track on the album, "A Little Bit Like You," was released as a single.

== Track listing ==
1. "A Little Bit Like You" – 2:53
2. "Cash 22" – 3:45
3. "Baby Steps" – 3:43
4. "Mansion House Blues" – 3:01
5. "Sands, Flamingo, Desert Inn" – 3:13
6. "Midnight Train" – 2:30
7. "Sunset & Void" – 4:45
8. "House of the Setting Sun" – 3:38
9. "Killjoy" – 3:34
10. "Mexican Roulette" – 2:56
11. "The Waiting Game" – 3:21
12. "Five for the Road" – 3:00
13. "Killer in the Rain" – 3:15
14. "The Long Walk Home" – 3:04
15. "Night Must Fall" – 4:07
