= Ginmill Perfume =

Compilation album by the Flaming Stars
- Released: October 2001
- Genre: Garage punk, indie rock
- Label: Alternative Tentacles
- Producer: Liam Watson, Ed Deegan and The Flaming Stars

Professional ratings
Review scores
Source	Rating
AllMusic	4/5 stars

Ginmill Perfume was a US/Canada-only compilation album by the Flaming Stars, featuring tracks drawn from the first four Vinyl Japan albums and singles prior to 2001.

== Track listing ==
1. "Like Trash" - 3:29
2. "Ten Feet Tall" - 4:23
3. "Who's Out There?" - 3:45
4. "Some Things You Don't Forget" - 3:12
5. "Only Tonight" - 2:25
6. "Bury My Heart at Pier 13" - 3:37
7. "The Last Picture Show" - 3:52
8. "New Hope for the Dead" - 2:39
9. "You Don't Always Want What You Get" - 4:01
10. "Blood Money" - 3:09
11. "The Face on the Bar Room Floor" - 3:19
12. "A Place in the Sun" - 4:11
13. "Bring Me The Rest of Alfredo Garcia" - 3:17
14. "Coffin Ed and Grave Digger Jones" - 3:01
15. "Kiss Tomorrow Goodbye" - 4:03
