= Born Under a Bad Neon Sign =

Album by The Flaming Stars

Studio album by The Flaming Stars
- Released: 2006
- Recorded: 29 March – 7 June 2006
- Genre: Garage punk, indie rock
- Label: UK – Big Beat
- Producer: The Flaming Stars

Professional ratings
Review scores
| Source | Rating |
|---|---|
| AllMusic | 4/5 stars |

Born Under a Bad Neon Sign is the seventh studio album by The Flaming Stars. It was recorded and mixed by Ed Deegan at Gizzard Studios in London. The record is dedicated to the then recently departed and long-time friend of Max's, Nikki Sudden. It is also the first album to feature a duet – Holly Golightly appears on the title track with Max Décharné.

== Track listing ==
1. "Senator McCarthy Paranoid Witch Hunt Blues" – 3:05
2. "Born Under a Bad Neon Sign" – 3:40
3. "Treptower Park" – 3:55
4. "Should've Happened Before" – 2:43
5. "Cold War One" – 2:25
6. "It's So Fine" – 2:25
7. "Something's Wrong With This Picture" – 2:52
8. "Too Late to Turn Back, Too Early to Say Goodbye" – 3:59
9. "All This (and so Much More)" – 3:09
10. "Keine Ahnung" – 2:41
11. "The Road to Rendition" – 2:37
12. "All The Same to Me" – 4:31
13. "God Told Me to Do It" – 5:37
