= Named and Shamed =

Studio album by the Flaming Stars
- Released: 16 November 2004
- Recorded: 16 April – 18 May 2004
- Genres: Garage punk, indie rock
- Labels: UK – Vinyl Japan; US – Alternative Tentacles
- Producer: The Flaming Stars

Professional ratings
Review scores
Source	Rating
AllMusic	4/5 stars
Uncut	2/5 stars

Named and Shamed is an album by the Flaming Stars. It was recorded and mixed by Ed Deegan at Toe Rag Studios.

== Track listings ==
1. "She's Gone" – 2:40
2. "Where the Beautiful People Go" – 2:03
3. "The Marabou Shuffle" – 3:27
4. "Spilled Your Pint" – 3:24
5. "Another Dial" – 2:54
6. "The Parade's Gone By" – 3:37
7. "Stranger on the Fifth Floor" – 4:34
8. "If You Give 'Em a Chance" – 2:04
9. "Bess of the Boneyard" – 2:45
10. "The 39 Stops" – 2:30
11. "Nine Out of Ten" – 2:11
12. "Named & Shamed" – 3:12
13. "Locked in Tight" – 2:38
