= Songs from the Bar Room Floor =

1996 album by The Flaming Stars

Studio album by The Flaming Stars
- Released: 1996
- Recorded: 11 January – 13 February 1996
- Genre: Garage punk, indie rock
- Label: UK – Vinyl Japan
- Producer: Liam Watson and the Flaming Stars

Professional ratings
Review scores
Source	Rating
AllMusic	4/5 stars

Songs from the Bar Room Floor is the first album by The Flaming Stars. It was recorded entirely using valve equipment at Toe Rag Studios in London during January and February 1996. Produced by Liam Watson and The Flaming Stars. Mastered at Porky's by Mr George Peckham. The record is dedicated to the then recently departed Dean Martin, Sterling Morrison and Charlie Rich.

== Track listing ==
1. "The Face on the Bar Room Floor" – 3:19
2. "Forget My Name" – 3:17
3. "You Can't Lie" – 2:51
4. "Who's Out There?" – 3:45
5. "Burnt Out Wreck of a Man" – 2:41
6. "Bring Me The Rest of Alfredo Garcia" – 3:11
7. "Kiss Tomorrow Goodbye" – 3:57
8. "The Ballad of the Walking Wounded" – 4:25
9. "Downhill Without Brakes" – 2:45
10. "Theme from 'Dog Instruction'" – 2:47
11. "Back of My Mind" – 2:51
12. "Down to You" – 3:49
13. "Oncoming Train" – 4:01
14. "Tub's Twist" – 3:03
15. "Like Trash" – 3:37
16. "3AM on the Bar Room Floor" – 3:51
