= Bring Me the Rest of Alfredo Garcia =

Bring Me the Rest of Alfredo Garcia - Singles 1995-1996

Compilation album by The Flaming Stars
- Released: March 1997
- Genre: Garage punk, indie rock
- Label: Vinyl Japan

Professional ratings
Review scores
Source	Rating
NME	7/10

Bring Me the Rest of Alfredo Garcia - Singles 1995-1996 was the first compilation album by The Flaming Stars. An import to the United States, it was released as a compact disc on February 24, 2003, on the label Vinyl Japan.

== Track listing ==
1. "Bring Me the Rest of Alfredo Garcia" - Volume 15 version 1995
2. "Money to Burn" - EP version 1995
3. "Bury My Heart at Pier 13" - Previously unreleased 1996
4. "Like Trash" - EP version 1995
5. "Get Carter" - Single B side 1995
6. "New Shade of Black" - EP version 1995
7. "Ten Feet Tall" - Single 1996
8. "A Hell of a Woman" - EP version 1995
9. "The Face on the Bar Room Floor" - Single version 1995
10. "Bandit Country" - EP version 1995
11. "Downhill Without Brakes" - EP 1996. Also on debut album.
12. "Revenge" - EP version 1995
13. "Broken Heart" - EP version 1996
14. "Davy Jones' Locker" - EP version 1995
15. "3AM on the Bar Room Floor" - Previously unreleased album outtake 1996
16. "Kiss Tomorrow Goodbye" - EP version 1995
17. "Eat Your Heart Out" - EP version 1996
18. "Spaghetti Junction" - EP version 1996
19. "Burnt Out Wreck of a Man" - EP version 1996
