= Sell Your Soul to the Flaming Stars =

Studio album by The Flaming Stars
- Released: October 1997
- Recorded: 15–24 July 1997 at Toe Rag Studios, London
- Genre: Garage punk, indie rock
- Length: 34:11
- Label: Vinyl Japan
- Producer: Ed Deegan, The Flaming Stars

Professional ratings
Review scores
Source	Rating
Allmusic	4/5 stars
Select	3/5 medals

Sell Your Soul to the Flaming Stars is the second studio album by The Flaming Stars. The album was recorded in nine days and was released in October 1997 via Vinyl Japan.

== Track listing ==
1. "Sweet Smell of Success" – 2:25
2. "Blood Money" – 3:10
3. "London After Midnight" – 3:26
4. "The Street That Never Closes" – 2:34
5. "I Remembered to Forget to Remember" – 3:11
6. "New Hope for the Dead" – 2:40
7. "Find Yourself Another Drunk" – 1:58
8. "Don't Need the Sunshine" – 3:24
9. "What You Want" – 2:03
10. "Just Too Bad" – 2:25
11. "Don't Mean a Thing If You Haven't Got the King" – 2:20
12. "Better Than That" – 2:24
13. "The Day the Earth Caught Fire" – 2:29
