= Pathway (album) =

Studio album by The Flaming Stars
- Released: May 1999
- Recorded: October 1998 – January 1999
- Genre: Garage punk, indie rock
- Label: UK - Vinyl Japan; US - Alternative Tentacles

Professional ratings
Review scores
Source	Rating
Allmusic	4/5 stars

Pathway is the third studio album by The Flaming Stars. As the title suggests, this was recorded at Pathway Studios, in common with some of the early Stiff Records recordings.

== Track listing ==
1. "Breaking Down" - 2:12
2. "Only Tonight" - 2:26
3. "Coffin Ed & Grave Digger Jones" - 3:01
4. "Sixteen Coaches Long" - 4:07
5. "Maybe One Day" - 1:56
6. "Lit up Like a Christmas Tree" - 2:56
7. "Once Bitten, Once Shy" - 2:36
8. "Malice Doesn't Live Here Anymore" - 3:02
9. "Running Out of Time" - 3:39
10. "House of Dreams" - 3:30
11. "Sing Sing" - 2:12
12. "Eight Miles Down" - 2:12
13. "Black Mask" - 3:34
14. "Just How It Feels" - 2:19
15. "The Ghost of Baghdad" - 3:22
16. "The Last Picture Show" - 3:54
