= The Flaming Stars =

English underground garage punk band

- Genres: Garage punk Indie rock
- Years active: 1994–present
- Labels: UK – Ace Records; Big Beat Records; Vinyl Japan; US – Alternative Tentacles
- Members: Max Décharné; Huck Whitney; Mark Hosking; Joe Whitney; Paul Dempsey; Johnny Johnson (to 1996)
- Website: http://www.myspace.com/theflamingstars

The Flaming Stars are an English underground garage punk band.

== History ==
The band was formed in November 1994 in Camden, London, England, by lead singer and Ex-Gallon Drunk drummer Max Décharné, guitarists Johnny Johnson (replaced in 1996 by Huck Whitney) and Mark Hosking, bassist Paul Dempsey, and Joe Whitney on the drums. They took their name from an Elvis Presley film title. The band was signed to the London-based, but Japanese owned, Vinyl Japan UK Ltd. The band first gained attention in Europe when they released their EP "Hospital, Heaven or Hell" which received praise from well-known English radio personalities John Peel and Steve Lamacq. Because of this, they recorded six John Peel Sessions which were released throughout the 1990s and eventually released together in 2000 on a double album, The Six John Peel Sessions.

In 1996, the Flaming Stars released their first album, Songs From the Bar Room Floor, which was followed by Sell Your Soul to the Flaming Stars in 1997. In 2001, The Flaming Stars released A Walk on the Wired Side, a slight departure from their previous works. The album took less from 1960s style garage rock and instead focused more on creating their own unique sound. The Stars gained a minor hit in the UK from their album A Walk on the Wired Side with the song, "Some Things You Don't Forget". The band received considerable attention in the UK's underground scene while remaining fairly unknown in the United States. The Flaming Stars released their fifth studio album, Sunset & Void, in 2002.

Two years later in 2004, the Flaming Stars released Named and Shamed, their 10th anniversary album. In early 2006, Vinyl Japan went into receivership and the Stars were signed to Big Beat Records, which is owned by Ace Records. On 16 March that year, they released their first effort on Big Beat, a 42 track compilation album London After Midnight: Singles, Rarities and Bar Room Floor-Fillers 1995-2005. In September 2006, they released their seventh studio album, Born Under A Bad Neon Sign.

The Flaming Stars played a comeback gig supporting The Nightingales at Dublin Castle, Camden on 26 October 2016.

== Discography ==
=== Studio albums ===
- Songs from the Bar Room Floor (Vinyl Japan 1996)
- Sell Your Soul to the Flaming Stars (Vinyl Japan 1997)
- Pathway (Vinyl Japan 1999)
- A Walk on the Wired Side (Vinyl Japan 2001)
- Sunset & Void (Vinyl Japan 2002)
- Named and Shamed (Vinyl Japan 2004)
- Born Under A Bad Neon Sign (Big Beat, 2006)

=== Singles and EPs ===
- "Hospital, Heaven or Hell" (tracks "Kiss Tomorrow Goodbye" / "Davy Jones' Locker" / "Like Trash" / "Revenge" - Vinyl Japan, March 1995)
- "The Face On The Bar Room Floor" / "Get Carter" (Vinyl Japan, August 1995)
- "Money To Burn" / "Bandit Country" / "A Hell of a Woman" / "New Shade of Black" (Vinyl Japan, December 1995)
- "Downhill Without Brakes" / "Broken Heart" / "Eat Your Heart Out" / "Burnt Out Wreck of a Man" (Vinyl Japan, May 1996)
- "Ten Feet Tall" / "Spaghetti Junction" (Vinyl Japan, December 1996)
- "Bury My Heart At Pier 13" / "Down to You" (live in London) (Vinyl Japan, March 1997)
- "New Hope For The Dead" / "Are You Being Served" (Vinyl Japan, October 1997)
- "Sweet Smell Of Success" / "The Day The Earth Caught Fire" / "Never Missed You Tonight" / "A Place in the Sun" (Vinyl Japan, April 1998)
- "Only Tonight" / "Lit Up Like A Christmas Tree" / "Revenge" (live in Japan) / "A Hell of a Woman" (live in Japan) (Vinyl Japan, November 1999)
- "You Don't Always Want What You Get" / "Saturday Night Special" (Vinyl Japan, January 2001)
- "One Lonely Night" / "Days Like This" (Alternative Tentacles, September 2001)
- "Some Things You Don't Forget" / "Only Tonight" (Vinyl Japan, 2001)
- "A Little Bit Like You" / "The Man Who Would be B.B. King" (Vinyl Japan, September 2002)
- "Spilled Your Pint" / "Sixty Nine" (Vinyl Japan, Bang! Records, 2004)
- "Stranger On the Fifth Floor" / "New Hope for the Dead" (live in Germany) (Vinyl Japan 2005)

=== Other albums ===
- Bring Me the Rest of Alfredo Garcia (Singles 1995-1996) (Vinyl Japan, March 1997)
- The Six John Peel Sessions (Vinyl Japan, 2000)
- Tijuana Bible, (Nippon Columbia, July 2000) (Japanese release only)
- Ginmill Perfume, (Alternative Tentacles, October 2001) (North American release only)
- London After Midnight: Singles, Rarities and Bar Room Floor-Fillers 1995-2005 (Big Beat Records, 2006)

=== Tracks on other compilations ===
- The Face on the Bar Room Floor appeared on "Various Artists do the Nuclear Tests in Paris and Beijing" (Vinyl Japan, 1995) NB The Earls of Suave track "A Cheat" also appears on the same CD. The Earls featured most of The Flaming Stars members.
- Bring Me the Rest of Alfredo Garcia appears on the 'CD magazine' "Volume 15" (Volume, 1995)
- Back of My Mind appeared on "Cowpunks" (Vinyl Junkie, 1996)
- Like Trash appeared on "What Did You Come Down Here For? Music from Club Zitt" (Genki, 1996)
- A Hell of a Woman appeared on "Plan Boom" (What's That Noise, 1998)
- "Spilled Your Pint" appeared on "Sci-Fi Lo-Fi Vol.1: Mixed By Andrew Weatherall" (Soma, 2007)
