= Terry Edwards =

British musician (born 1960)

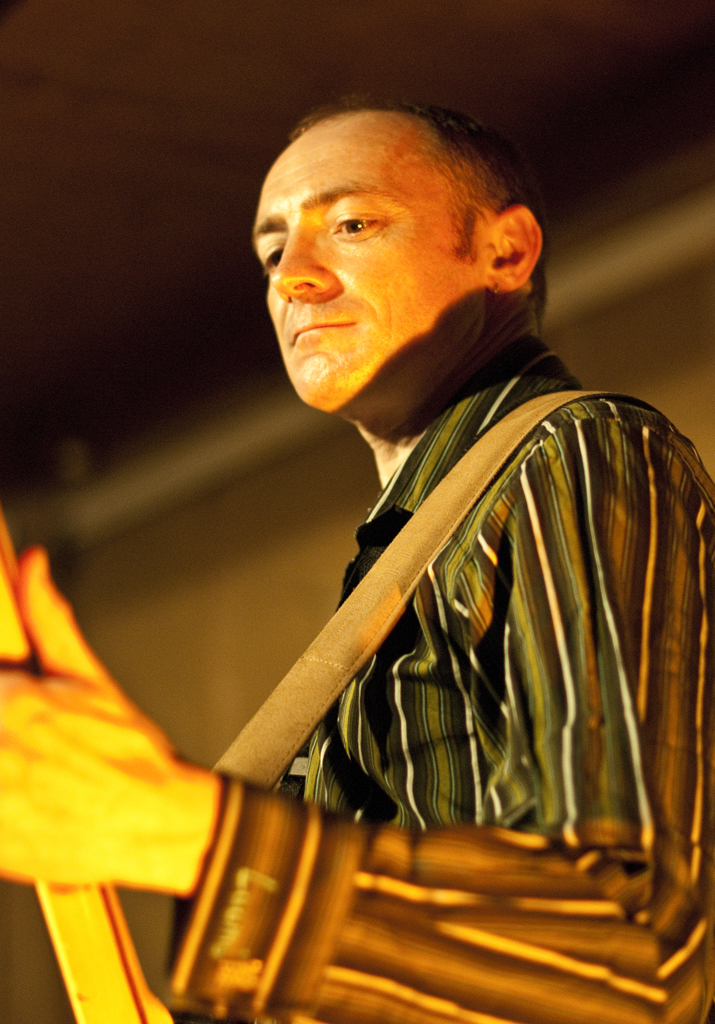
- Edwards performing in 2010

Background information
- Born: 10 August 1960 (age 66); Hornchurch, Essex, England
- Origin: London, England
- Genres: Post punk; ska; alternative rock
- Occupation: Musician
- Instruments: Saxophone; trumpet; flugelhorn; keyboards; guitar
- Years active: 1981–present
- Labels: Stim; Sartorial
- Member of: The Higsons; Gallon Drunk; Terry Edwards and the Scapegoats; Glen Matlock and the Philistines; Big Sexy Noise; The PJ Harvey band
- Website: terryedwards.co.uk

Terry Edwards (born 10 August 1960) is an English musician who plays trumpet, flugelhorn, saxophones, guitar and keyboards.

== Biography ==
Edwards gained a degree in music from the University of East Anglia in 1982, where he was also a founding member of The Higsons. He produced and played on the debut album by Yeah Jazz called Six Lane Ends. He has subsequently performed and released records both as a solo artist and with his band The Scapegoats. He has played as a session musician and as a collaborator with Derek Raymond (on the Dora Suarez album), Madness, The Fierce and the Dead,Mark Bedford, Tindersticks, Spiritualized, Spare Snare, Siouxsie, The Creatures, Nick Cave, The Jesus and Mary Chain, Department S, Lydia Lunch, Faust, Snuff, Tom Waits, Jack, The Blockheads, Hot Chip, and Robyn Hitchcock.

Edwards joined Gallon Drunk in 1993, staying with the band through the recording of three albums. Also in 1993 he made a guest live appearance with PJ Harvey, later in 1997, he was a guest studio musician for the band.

He collaborated with Lydia Lunch and other members of Gallon Drunk in Big Sexy Noise, and performed live with Lunch outside the band. More recently he has performed with the David Bowie supergroup, Holy Holy.

Since around 2015, Edwards has performed with PJ Harvey and appeared on the group's 2016 album The Hope Six Demolition Project.

He is also a member of The Near Jazz Experience with Madness bassist Mark Bedford & former Higsons drummer Simon Charterton.

== Solo discography ==
=== Albums ===
- New York New York (1985), Izuma – as New York New York
- Dora Suarez (1993), Clawfist – with Derek Raymond and James Johnston
- I Didn't Get Where I Am Today (1997), Wiiija – Terry Edwards and the Scapegoats
- My Wife Doesn't Understand Me (1997), Artlos/Stim – Terry Edwards and the Scapegoats
- Yesterday's Zeitgeist : Terry Edwards in Concert (1999), Sartorial
- Terry Edwards Presents No Fish Is Too Weird For Her Aquarium Vol. II (2000), Sartorial
- 681 at the Southbank + Plays, Salutes & Executes (2002), Sartorial
- Memory and Madness (2003), Sartorial/Widowspeak – with Lydia Lunch
- Terry Edwards (2005), Sartorial

Compilations

- Plays Salutes And Executes (1993), Stim
- Terry Edwards' Large Door (18 Tracks From The Golden Age Of Vinyl) (1998), Damaged Goods
- Terry Edwards Presents... Queer Street – No Fish Is Too Weird For Her Aquarium Vol. III (2003), Sartorial

=== EPs ===
- Terry Edwards Plays The Music of Jim & William Reid (1991), Stim
- Terry Edwards Salutes The Magic of the Fall (1991), Stim
- Terry Edwards Executes Miles Davis Numbers (1992), Stim
- Boots Off!!, Wiija – Terry Edwards and the Scapegoats

=== Singles ===
- "Roger Wilson Said" (1983), Urchin – as New York New York
- "I Wanna Be Like You" (1985), Beach Culture – as New York New York
- "Well You Needn't" (1994), Rough Trade
- "Head Up High" (1998), Flighted Miskick – Scousemartins fet. Terry Edwards
- "Girls & Boys" (1995), Damaged Goods – Terry Edwards and the Scapegoats
- "Ice Cream for Crow" (1998), Damaged Goods – Terry Edwards and the Scapegoats
- "Cat People/Gasoline" (2007), Sartorial – Terry Edwards and the Scapegoats, split with Department S
- "Three Blind Mice" (2008), The Orchestra Pit – Terry Edwards and the Scapegoats
- "Boots Off !!!" (2009), Sartorial – Terry Edwards and the Scapegoats, split with Cure-Ator
- "I'll Go Crazy" (2010), Sartorial
- "Let's Surf"/"Old Man's Hands" (2011), Sartorial – Terry Edwards and The Dash/Terry Edwards and Darren Hayman
- "You Won't See Me" (2011), Sartorial – split with Robyn Hitchcock

== See also ==
- Hux Records
- List of Peel Sessions
- Phoenix Festival
- Wiiija
