= James Johnston (English musician) =

British rock musician

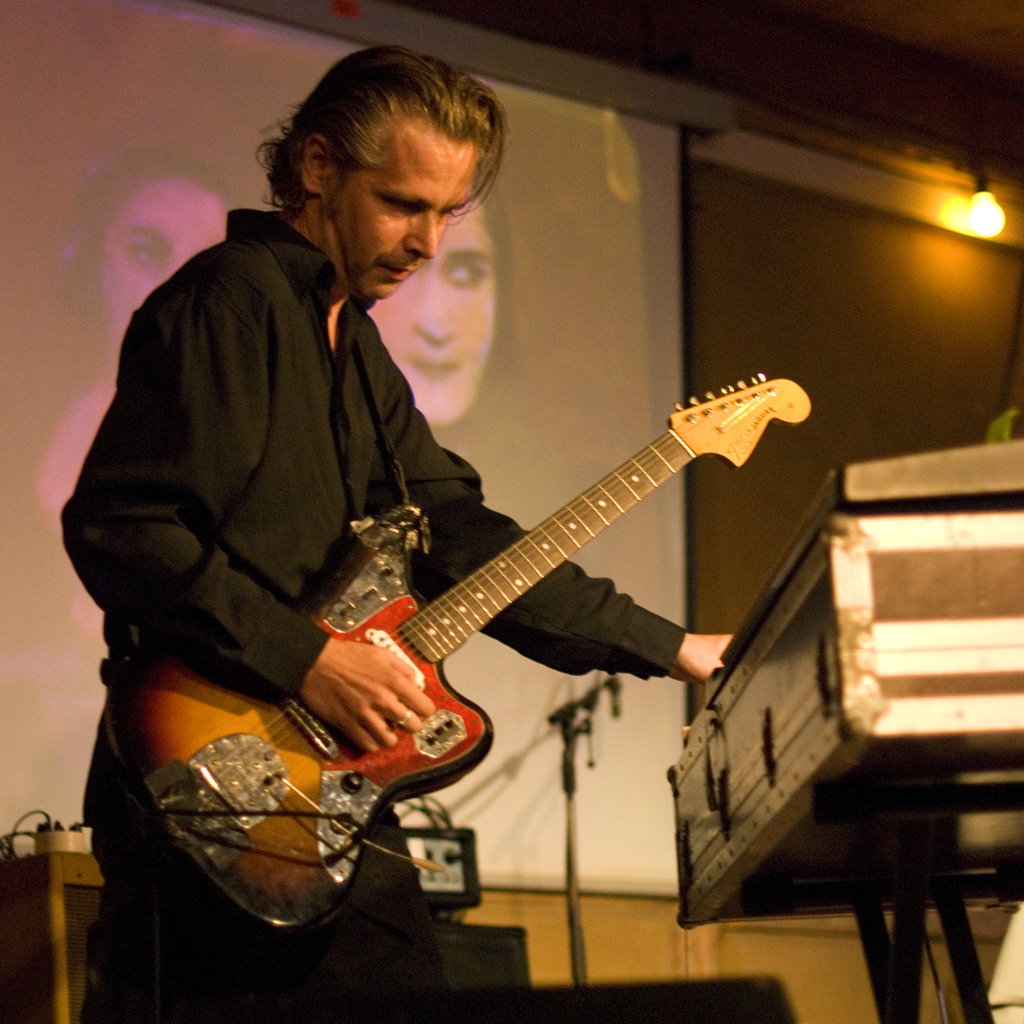
- James Johnston performing at the Avantgarde Festival in Schiphorst, Germany, in August 2009.

Background information
- Born: 1966 (age 59–60); Guildford, Surrey, England
- Genres: Alternative rock
- Instruments: Guitar, electronic organ, vocals, violin, harmonica, piano.
- Years active: Late 1980s–present
- Member of: Gallon Drunk
- Formerly of: Nick Cave and the Bad Seeds

James Johnston (born 1966) is an English alternative rock musician and painter. He is best known as the founder and frontman of Gallon Drunk and the former guitarist and organist of Nick Cave and the Bad Seeds. Johnston has also released albums as a solo artist, and contributed to recordings by and toured with different artists, including PJ Harvey, Faust, Barry Adamson and Lydia Lunch.

== Biography ==
=== Musical career ===
Johnston founded the London-based alternative rock band Gallon Drunk in 1990 as frontman and main songwriter. The group have been active, both recording and touring, to the present, releasing eight studio albums, compilations, and one live album, most recent being 2014's acclaimed The Soul Of The Hour.

Johnston was a touring member of Nick Cave and the Bad Seeds in 1994, filling in for Blixa Bargeld during the band's Lollapalooza stint. He was a full-time Bad Seed from 2003 to 2008, contributing to the albums Abattoir Blues/The Lyre of Orpheus (2004) and Dig, Lazarus, Dig!!! (2007).

He has also recorded and toured with a wide variety of other musicians, including Lydia Lunch (both solo and as the band Big Sexy Noise), French alternative rock group Ulan Bator, Barry Adamson, and as a member of legendary Krautrock band Faust, and recording and performing with PJ Harvey.

Johnston has contributed scores to numerous film and television projects, the play The Nest, working together with PJ Harvey, and most recently All About Eve stage play, again with PJ Harvey.

He has collaborated with Ken Russell, and acted for Olivier Assayas in his award-winning film Clean.

Johnston released a solo album, The Starless Room, in November 2016 which was produced by Johann Scheerer.

On 26 February 2021, Johnston released a collaborative album with musician and photographer Steve Gullick titled We Travel Time.

=== Painting career ===
Johnston's turn to painting initially began with working small scale in hotel rooms on tour, subsequently becoming his primary focus as a daily studio practice. His work has been used on book covers, album artwork and in art publications.

Johnson is a figurative painter. His paintings are both bold and loose. The often unsettling, darkly humorous, and totemic images are based between the everyday and the world of the imagination.

==== Solo shows ====
The Stash gallery, London. 2019.

==== Group shows ====
- Linear – Gallery 64a. 2018.
- Extricate – Gallery 64a. 2018.
- A Letter in Mind – The Oxo Tower, London. 2018.
- Push The Boat Out – The Art Academy Walworth. 2018.
- Jo Mama's Alphabet Show – Studio One gallery. 2018.
- Jo Mama's Second Alphabet Show – A-side B-side gallery. 2018
- You Know More Than I Know – The Art Academy, London. 2019
- A Letter in Mind – The Oxo Tower, London. 2019.

==== Magazine and book appearances ====
- Persona #8. France. 2019
- Sargasso arts magazine (Featured artist and cover art). Germany. 2018
- Epifanio 2018 edition. Estonia.Johnson is a figurative painter.
- Featured artist in Prospero Arts, The Economist. 2019.
- The Art of the Murder Ballad. (featured artist) Holland.
- 'Nadirs' – Tom Buron. (cover art)
- 'Love is an ancient disease' – M.A. Littler. (cover art).
