= Television Personalities discography =

The following is a list of releases by the English post-punk band the Television Personalities, who formed in 1977.

== Albums ==
The following is a complete list of the Television Personalities albums.

- ...And Don't the Kids Just Love It (1981, Rough Trade)
- Mummy Your Not Watching Me (1982, Whaam! Records)
- They Could Have Been Bigger than the Beatles (1982, Whaam! Records)
- The Painted Word (1984, Illuminated Records)
- Privilege (1989, Fire Records)
- Closer to God (1992, Fire Records)
- I Was a Mod Before You Was a Mod (1995, Overground Records)
- Don't Cry Baby, It's Only a Movie (1998, Damaged Goods Records)
- My Dark Places (2006, Domino)
- Are We Nearly There Yet? (2007, Overground Records)
- A Memory Is Better Than Nothing (2010, Rocket Girl)
- Beautiful Despair (2017, Fire Records)

== Live ==
- Chocolat-Art (A Tribute to James Last) (1985, Pastell - live in Germany 1984)
- Camping in France (1991, Overground)
- Top Gear (1996, Overground)
- Made In Japan (1996, Little Teddy Recordings)
- Mod Is Dead (1996, Teenage Kicks)
- Paisley Shirts & Mini Skirts (1997, Overground - Live at the Hammersmith Clarendon, London 1980)
- Another Kind of Trip (Live 1985-1993) (2021, Fire Records (UK))

== EPs ==
- Where's Bill Grundy Now? (1978, King's Road)
- The Strangely Beautiful (1991, Fire)
- How I Learned to Love the Bomb (1994, Overground)

== Compilations ==
- Yes Darling, but is it Art? (Early Singles & Rarities) (1995, Fire)
- Prime Time 1981-1992 (1997, Nectar Masters)
- Part Time Punks – The Very Best of the Television Personalities (1999, Cherry Red)
- The Boy Who Couldn't Stop Dreaming (2000, Vinyl Japan)
- Fashion Conscious (The Little Teddy Years) (2002, Little Teddy Recordings)
- And They All Lived Happily Ever After (2005, Damaged Goods)
- Singles 1978-1987 (2007, Vinyl Japan)

== Singles ==
- "14th Floor" (1978 - Side A: "14th Floor", Side B: "Oxford St. W.1" - GLC Records - released as Teen '78)
- "Smashing Time!" (1980 - Side A: "Smashing Time", Side B: "King and Country" - Rough Trade Records - RT 051)
- "I Know Where Syd Barrett Lives"/"Arthur The Gardener" (1981 - Side A: "I Know Where Syd Barrett Lives", Side B: "Arthur The Gardener" - Rough Trade Records - RT 063)
- "Painting By Numbers" (1981 - Side A: "Painting By Numbers", Side B: "Lichtenstein Girl" - Whaam! Records - WHAAM 001)
- "Three Wishes" (1982 - Side A: "Three Wishes", Side B: "Geoffrey Ingram"/"And Don't The Kids Just Love It!" - Whaam! Records - WHAAM 4 - released as Gifted Children)
- "Biff Bang Pow!" (1982 - Side A: "Biff Bang Pow!", Side B: "A Picture of Dorian Grey" - Creation Artifact - 002)
- "A Sense of Belonging" (1983 - Side A: "A Sense of Belonging", Side B: "Paradise Estate" - Rough Trade - RT 109)
- "How I Learned to Love the Bomb" (1986 - Side A: "How I Learned to Love the Bomb", Side B: "Grocer's Daughter"/"Girl Called Charity" - Dreamworld - Dream 10)
- "The Prettiest Girl in the World"/"If That's What Love Is" (1987 - Side A: "The Prettiest Girl in the World", Side B: "If That's What Love Is" - Overground Records - over 15)
- "I Still Believe in Magic" (1989 - Side A: "I Still Believe in Magic", Side B: "Respectable" - Caff Corporation - CAFF 5)
- "Salvador Dali's Garden Party" (1989 - Side A: "Salvador Dali's Garden Party", Side B: "The Room at the Top of the Stairs" - Fire Records - BLAZE 37S)
- "She's Never Read My Poems" (1991 - Side A: "She's Never Read My Poems", Side B: "The Day The Dolphins Leave The Sea"/"Christ Knows, I Have Tried" - Fire Records - BLAZE 44049)
- "Your Class"/"Someone To Share My Life With" (1991 - Side A: "Your Class", Side B: "BMX Bandits"/"Someone To Share My Life With"/"Clawfist" - PIG 8 - split with "BMX Bandits", each band covered other band's song)
- "We Will Be Your Gurus" (1992 - Side A: "We Will Be Your Gurus", Side B: "An Exhibition By Joan Miro"/"Love Is Better Than War" - Seminal Twang - TWANG 15)
- "Favourite Films" (1992 - Side A: "Favourite Films", Side B: "The Dream Inspires"/"Happy All The Time" (Ten Years Ahead Of Its Time version) - Overground Records - Over 27 - from the 1984 Whaam! compilation All for art...and art for all)
- "Goodnight Mr Spaceman" (1993 - CD: "Goodnight Mr Spaceman"/"If I Was Your Girl Friend"/"She Loves It When He Sings Like Elvis"/"Goodnight Mr" - Fire Records - BLAZE65CD)
- "The Happening" (1995 - Side A: "Jennifer, Julie & Josephine", Side B: "The Bartlebees"/"Why Don't You Smile Now?" - Little Teddy Recordings - LiTe 739 - split with "The Bartlebees")
- "Time Goes Slowly When You're Drowning" (1995 - Side A: "Time Goes Slowly When You're Drowning", Side B: "Meanwhile In A Luxury Dockland Home" - Little Teddy Recordings - LiTe 716)
- "I Was A Mod Before You Was A Mod" (Easy Mix) (1996 - Side A: "I Was A Mod Before You Was A Mod" (Easy Mix), Side B: "She Lives For The Moment" - Overground Records - OVER50 - Limited edition of 1000)
- "Bike" (1996 - Side A: "Bike"/"No One's Little Girl", Side B: "Seasons In The Sun" - TwistRecords - Twis 20)
- "Now That I'm A Junkie!" (1996 - Side A: "Now That I'm A Junkie", Side B: "How Does It Feel To Be Loved?" - Little Teddy Recordings - LiTe741)
- "When I Grow Up I Want To Be…" (1999 - Side A: "The Boy Who Couldn't Stop Dreaming", Side B: "When I Grow Up I Want To Be…" - Damaged Goods - damgood 170)
- "All The Young Children On Crack" (2006 - Side A: "All The Young Children On Crack", Side B: "Any Love Is Good Love" - Domino - RUG220)
- "The Good Anarchist" (2008 - Side A: "The Good Anarchist", Side B: "She's Always Been There For Me" - ElefantRecords - ER-256)
- "My New Tattoo" (2009 - Side A: "My New Tattoo", Side B: "Funny He Never Married" - Good Village Recordings - GVR 2)
- "People Think That We're Strange" (2009 - Side A: "People Think That We're Strange", Side B: "A Glimpse of My Genius" - ElefantRecords - er-269)
- "You're My Yoko" (2010 - Side A: "You're My Yoko", Side B: "The Girl From Nowhere" - Rocket Girl - rgirl58)
- "Wonder What It Was" (2011 - Side A: "Wonder What It Was", Side B: "Radiohead Song" - Formosa PunkRecords - SHADE 009)

== Tributes ==
- "I Don't Know Where Dan Treacy Lives" (1993, Popeye Tapes) The Tables
- "I Don't Know Where Dan Treacy Lives" (2000, Lookout Records) The Mr. T Experience
- If I Could Write Poetry (2003, The Beautiful Music)
- "¡Harte para todos" (2004, Discos Harte) Thy Surfyn' Eyes, TCR, Alpino, Los Part-Time Pops singing TVP's songs in Spanish
- Someone to Share My Life With (2005, But Is It Art) Nikki Sudden, Swell Maps, The Shambles, Semion, BMX Bandits, Jonathan Caws-Elwitt and others
- I Would Write A Thousand Words (2007, The Beautiful Music) Nikki Sudden, The Loch Ness Mouse, The Shambles, Swell Maps, Semion, Superczar, The Airwaves, Jonathan Caws-Elwitt, BMX Bandits and others
- "Song For Dan Treacy" MGMT on the album Congratulations
- All Those Times We Spent Together (2010, The Beautiful Music)
- "They Could Have Been Bigger Than Hiawata!" (2007, SellOut Music) by the Norwegian pop band Hiawata!

== Sources ==
- Berton, Benjamin. Dreamworld: The fabulous life of Daniel Treacy and his band Television Personalities. Mainz: Ventil Verlag, 2022. ISBN 978-3-9557-5621-5
- Young, Rob. Rough Trade: Labels Unlimited. London: Black Dog Publishing, 2006. ISBN 978-1-9047-7247-7
