= Dan Treacy =

English singer and songwriter

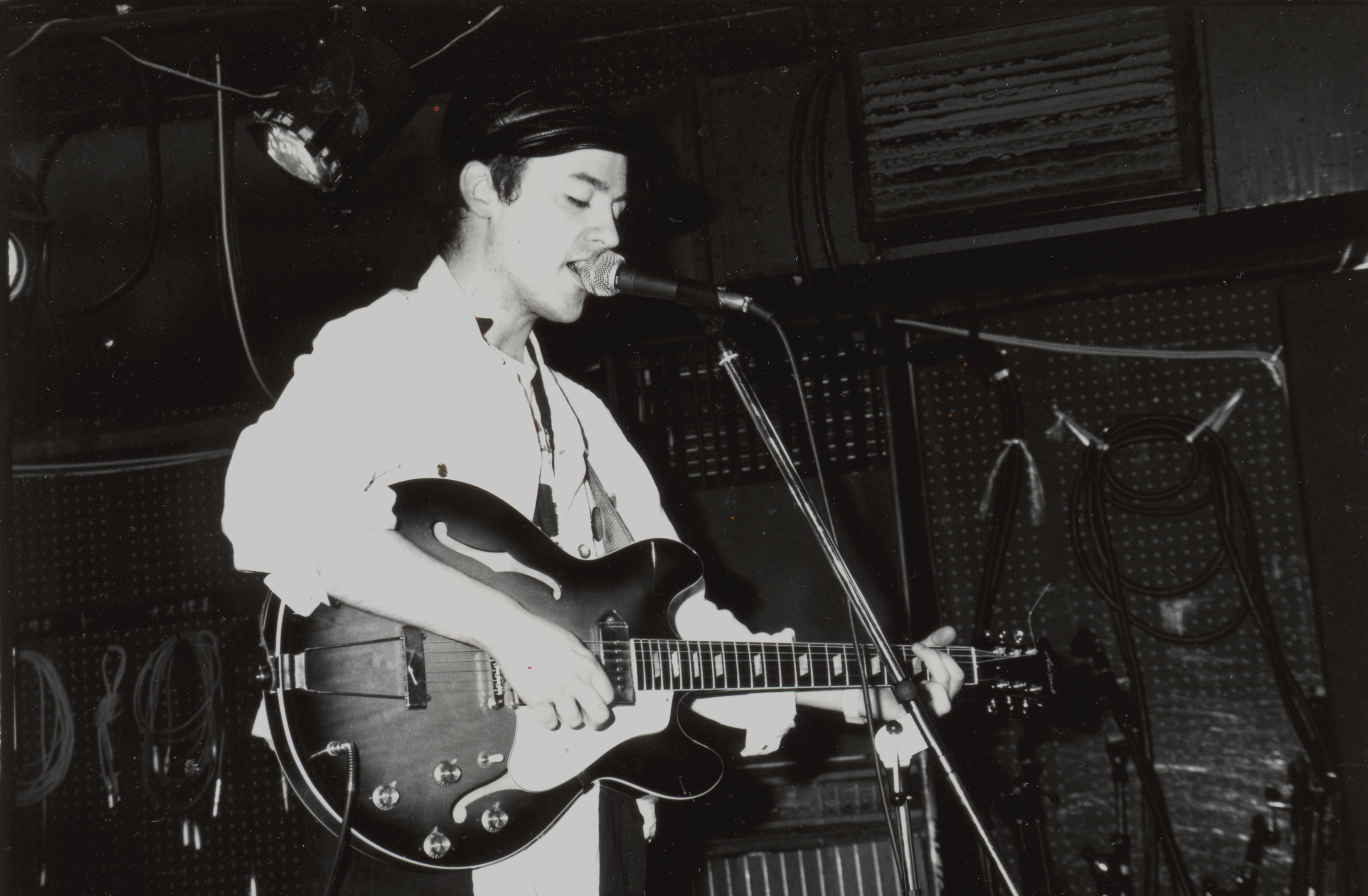
- Treacy performing with Television Personalities in Japan, April 1994
- Occupations: Singer and songwriter
- Musical career
- Instrument: Vocals
- Years active: 1977–present
- Member of: Television Personalities (TVP)

Dan Treacy is an English singer and songwriter best known as the founding member of the post-punk band the Television Personalities (TVP). The band was formed in 1977 with his childhood friends Ed Ball and "Slaughter Joe" Joe Foster while they were teenagers. Treacy was inspired on hearing the Sex Pistols and Jonathan Richman, among others.

== Career ==
Treacy has been the only constant member of the Television Personalities, and his career has had many peaks and lows, aggravated by prolonged bouts of depression and substance addiction. Throughout, his songwriting and musical style continued to evolve, and he is widely considered to have contributed to the development of post-punk, neo-psychedelia and indie pop. He has always been idiosyncratic to the point of ambivalence about music, being far more interested in satire. The band rarely ever practised, and he rarely prepared set lists for live performances, preferring to keep the band on their toes.

He is known for the numerous popular culture references and in-jokes scattered throughout the TVP's lyrics, album titles and release artwork. Most of the references are to cult films, 1970s and 1960s culture and forgotten celebrities.

== Discography ==
- ...And Don't the Kids Just Love It (1981, Rough Trade)
- Mummy Your Not Watching Me (1982, Whaam! Records)
- They Could Have Been Bigger than the Beatles (1982, Whaam! Records)
- The Painted Word (1984, Illuminated Records)}
- Privilege (1989, Fire Records)
- Closer to God (1992, Fire Records)
- I Was a Mod Before You Was a Mod (1995, Overground Records)
- Don't Cry Baby, It's Only a Movie (1998, Damaged Goods Records)
- My Dark Places (2006, Domino)
- Are We Nearly There Yet? (2007, Overground Records)
- A Memory Is Better Than Nothing (2010, Rocket Girl)
- Beautiful Despair (2018, Fire Records)

== Sources ==
- Berton, Benjamin (2022). Dreamworld: The fabulous life of Daniel Treacy and his band Television Personalities. Mainz: Black Dog Publishing. ISBN 978-3-9557-5621-5.
- Young, Ron (2006). Rough Trade: Labels Unlimitedy. London: Black Dog Publishing. ISBN 1-9047-7247-1.
