= Paul Heeren =

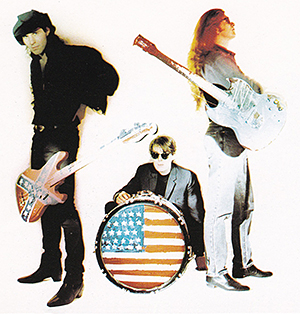
- The Times April 1992; Ed Ball, Paul Mulreany, Paul Heeren; Photograph Richard 'Amp' Walker

Background information
- Origin: Adelaide Australia
- Genres: Post punk, Indie, AOR
- Years active: 1970–2000
- Labels: Creation Records, WEA, Koch Records
- Website: paulheeren.com

Paul Heeren (born 22 November 1954 in Adelaide Australia) is a guitarist and songwriter.

== Music ==
Paul Heeren was a member of the 1990s band The Times, led by Ed Ball, playing guitar and providing occasional backing vocals. During this period he also guested with Ed Ball bands Conspiracy of Noise and Teenage Filmstars.

Having gained local exposure via the ABC (Australia) with progressive rock band Montage, Heeren moved to London where he worked as a session guitar player, eventually meeting Ed Ball when brought in to guest on 'E For Edward'. He continued to be involved with The Times throughout the 90s, performing with an unplugged version of band for the 1994 Creation Records 10th Anniversary concert at the Albert Hall. He also appeared with the Times on Gary Crowley's ITV music show 'The Beat'.

Heeren provided the solos for several songs on earlier albums, with comprehensive guitar contributions to 'The Times At The Astradome' and 'Alternative Commercial Crossover' albums. The single 'Lundi Bleu', a cover of New Order's 'Blue Monday', was a Radio 1 Single of the Week on its release, featuring his 'Dive Bomb' guitar.

Heeren provided Power chords on the recording of the United Kingdom's entry to the Eurovision Song Contest 1990 'Give a Little Love Back to the World' by Emma.

Also a songwriter, Heeren wrote the 1991 Highlander II film theme 'Trust', released on WEA, performed by Heeren Stevens, which included powerhouse rock vocalist Jan Parker (formerly Stevens), Gary Wallis (Pink Floyd) on drums, Nigel Ross-Scott (Re-flex) on bass and Adrian Lee (Mike + The Mechanics) on keyboards and acting as producer.

This was followed by the 1996 German release of the GAIA album 'Truth and Illusion' on Koch Records with Jan Parker on vocals, and featuring performances from Steve Alexander (drummer) and Jamie Lane on drums. The singles 'Moment of Truth' and 'Wonderland' were taken from the album.

== Telephony ==
Heeren engineered at Jongleurs Comedy Club, from its inception, and co-recorded their first live comedy album 'Live At Jongleurs'.

Heeren subsequently co-founded UK telephony company X-on with Paul Bensley in 2000. Based in Riduna Park, Suffolk, X-on supplies cloud based hosted telecommunications services throughout the UK and Internationally. X-on was acquired by Southern Communications Group in 2022.

== Discography ==
=== Albums ===
- The Times 'E For Edward' (October 1989)
- The Times 'Et Dieu Créa La Femme' (August 1990)
- The Times 'Pure' (August 1990)
- The Times 'The Times At The Astradome' (April 1992)
- The Times 'Alternative Commercial Crossover' (April 1993)
- Conspiracy of Noise 'Chicks With Dicks And Splatter Flicks' [Credited as Paul Hero] (1993)
- GAIA 'Truth and Illusion' (1996)
- Teenage Filmstars 'Buy Our Record And Support Our Sickness' [title in reverse] [Credited as Dean Angel] (1997)

=== Compilations ===
- 'Highlander II Soundtrack' (1991)
- 'Welcome to the Wonderful World of Ed Ball' (1995)
- Hot Stuff 'Melodic Rock' (1997)
- Hot Stuff 'Sentimental Rock' (1997)
- ArTpOp! 'Here's to Old England' (2005)

=== Singles ===
- The Times 'Manchester' [Backing Vocals] (1990)
- Heeren Stevens 'Trust' (1991)
- The Times 'Lundi Bleu' (1992)
- The Times 'Finnegans Break' [Featuring Tippa Irie] (1993)
- GAIA 'Moment of Truth' (1996)
- GAIA 'Wonderland' (1997)
- Edward Ball 'Love is Blue' [Backing Vocals] (1997)
