= ...And Don't the Kids Just Love It =

Studio album by Television Personalities
- Released: 20 February 1981
- Recorded: 1980
- Studio: Mount Pleasant (London)
- Genre: Post-punk; psychedelic pop; indie rock; lo-fi
- Length: 37:21
- Label: Rough Trade
- Producer: Vic Hammersmith-Broadway

Television Personalities chronology
...And Don't the Kids Just Love It (1981)	Mummy Your Not Watching Me (1982)

Professional ratings
Review scores
Source	Rating
AllMusic	4.5/5 stars
Pitchfork	9.5/10
Record Collector	5/5 stars
Record Mirror	5/5 stars
Spin Alternative Record Guide	8/10
Uncut	9/10

...And Don't the Kids Just Love It is the debut album by English post-punk band Television Personalities, released on 20 February 1981 by Rough Trade Records. It was recorded in 1980 by the lineup of Dan Treacy, Ed Ball, and Mark Sheppard. The album marked the band members' first full-length work, following several singles recorded with various associated projects, including 'O' Level and Teenage Filmstars.

The album's cover features a 1967 photograph of model Twiggy with actor Patrick Macnee, promoting the fashions of the television series The Avengers.

Fire Records reissued the album in 1990 and 2009 in the United Kingdom, while Razor & Tie reissued it in 1995 in the United States. In 2002, Pitchfork listed ...And Don't the Kids Just Love It as the 64th best album of the 1980s.

== Track listing ==
All tracks are written by Dan Treacy.

Side one
No.	Title	Length
1.	"This Angry Silence"	2:39
2.	"The Glittering Prizes"	3:01
3.	"World of Pauline Lewis"	2:38
4.	"A Family Affair"	2:36
5.	"Silly Girl"	2:49
6.	"Diary of a Young Man"	3:59
7.	"Geoffrey Ingram"	2:15

Side two
No.	Title	Length
1.	"I Know Where Syd Barrett Lives"	2:34
2.	"Jackanory Stories"	3:04
3.	"Parties in Chelsea"	1:41
4.	"La Grande Illusion"	3:33
5.	"A Picture of Dorian Gray"	2:13
6.	"The Crying Room"	1:59
7.	"Look Back in Anger"	2:40

== Personnel ==
Credits are adapted from the album's liner notes.

Television Personalities

- Dan Treacy
- Ed Ball
- Mark Sheppard

The sleeve notes assign a fictitious production credit to "Vic Hammersmith-Broadway", a reference to producer Vic Coppersmith-Heaven. The album was in fact produced by the band.

== Charts ==
Chart performance for ...And Don't the Kids Just Love It
Chart (1981)	Peak position
UK Independent Albums (Record Business)	19

== Bibliography ==
- Berton, Benjamin (2022). Dreamworld: The fabulous life of Daniel Treacy and his band Television Personalities. Mainz: Black Dog Publishing. ISBN 978-3-9557-5621-5.
- Young, Rob (2006). Rough Trade. Black Dog Publishing. ISBN 978-1-904772-47-7.
