= The Times (band) =

British band

- The Times circa 1983. L-R: John East, Simon Smith and Ed Ball

Background information
- Origin: London, England
- Genres: Post-punk, indie, power pop
- Years active: 1980–present
- Label: Whaam! Records
- Members: Ed Ball
- Past members: John M East; Dan Treacy; Alan McGee; Ray Kent; Dick Green; Paul Damien; Paul Heeren; Simon Smith; Misty Woods
- Website: myspace.com/thetimeslondon

The Times are a British indie band, the brainchild of Ed Ball, co-founder member of the Television Personalities, Teenage Filmstars and 'O' Level.

== Whaam! Records 1981–1982 ==
After releasing a string of 7-inch singles variously as O'Level ("We Love Malcolm", 1978), The Television Personalities' ("Part Time Punks", 1978), Teenage Filmstars ("There's A Cloud Over Liverpool", 1979, "I Helped Patrick McGoohan Escape", 1980), that culminated with the debut Television Personalities album "And Don't The Kids Just Love It" (1980) on Rough Trade Records, Edward Ball and Daniel Treacy opted for even more artistic control by setting up their own label, WHAAM! Records.

At the same time, recorded as a proposed Teenage Filmstars' debut LP, Ball's 1980 collection of songs was completed as "Go! With The Times", from which the first Times single "Red With Purple Flashes" (1981) was released on Whaam! This was followed by "Pop Goes Art!" (1982), released in individually hand-painted sleeves that executed the band's Pop Art visions.

== ArTpOp! Records 1982–1986 ==
On leaving the Television Personalities, and consequently Whaam!, Ball immediately launched the ARTPOP! label with the Times' second single "I Helped Patrick McGoohan Escape!" (September 1982). This was accompanied by humorous tongue in cheek video based on "The Prisoner" T.V. series that starred Patrick McGoohan. Ball's songwriting took a more serious turn with "This Is London" (1983). Songs like "Goodbye Piccadilly", "If Only", and the title track, match the bleakness and despair of Joy Division, the cutting sarcasm of The Jam. After the experimental electronics of "Hello Europe" (1984), Ball fulfilled a long-time ambition to stage Joe Orton's screenplay for the Beatles "Up Against It" at a West London theatre with Tony Conway from Mood Six. This culminated with the Times' fifth album "Up Against It" (1985).

== Discography ==

=== Studio albums ===
- Go! with the Times (November 1980 but released in 1985) [Reissued 2006 with extra tracks]
- Pop Goes Art! (January 1982) [Reissued 2008 with extra tracks]
- This Is London (May 1983) [Reissued 2006 with extra tracks]
- Hello Europe (September 1984)
- Up Against It (January 1986)
- Enjoy the Times (December 1986)
- Beat Torture (November 1988)
- E for Edward (October 1989)
- Et Dieu créa la femme (August 1990)
- Pure (August 1990)
- Alternative Commercial Crossover (April 1993)
- Sad but True (March 1997)
- Pirate Playlist 66 (December 1999)

=== Compilations ===
- Pink Ball Brown Ball Ed Ball – July 1991
- Welcome to the Wonderful World of Ed Ball – March 1995
- Here's to Old England! – October 2005

=== Live albums ===
- The Times at the Astradome Lunaville (April 1992)

=== EPs ===
- I Helped Patrick McGoohan Escape (November 1983) [Reissued 2006 with extra tracks]
- Blue Period (March 1985)
- Boys About Town EP – 12-inch, Artpop! (1985)
- Times TV – 12-inch, Fire Records (1986)

=== Singles ===
- "Red with Purple Flashes" – 7-inch, Whaam! (1981)
- "Here Comes the Holidays" – 7-inch, Artpop! (1982 – A-side credited to Joni Dee featuring The Times)
- "I Helped Patrick McGoohan Escape" – 7-inch, Artpop! (1982)
- "Boys Brigade" – 7-inch, Artpop! (1984)
- "Blue Fire" – 7-inch, Artpop! (1984)
- "London Boys" – 7-inch, Unicorn (1986)
- "Times TV" – 7-inch, Fire Records (1986)
- "Manchester" – 12-inch/CD, Creation Records (2008)
- "The Mods Are Back!" – split 7-inch, Caff Corporation (2008)
- "Lundi Bleu" – 7-inch/12"/CD, Creation Records (2010)
- "Finnegan's Break" – 7-inch/12", Creation Records (2011)
- "Baby Girl" – 7-inch/CD, Creation Records (2011)

=== Compilation appearances ===
- A Splash of Colour – "I Helped Patrick McGoohan Escape" (1981), WEA Records
- The Countdown Compilation (5-4-3-2-1 Go!) – "Whatever Happened to Thames Beat" (1985), Countdown

== See also ==
- Ed Ball (musician)
- Creation Records
- Television Personalities

== Sources ==
- Berton, Benjamin (2022). Dreamworld: The fabulous life of Daniel Treacy and his band Television Personalities. Mainz: Black Dog Publishing. ISBN 978-3-9557-5621-5.
