= Part Time Punks =

1980 song by Television Personalities

Song by Television Personalities
- Released: 1980
- Genre: Post-punk; indie rock; Mod revival
- Length: 2:37
- Label: Kings Road, Rough Trade
- Songwriter: Dan Treacy
- Producer: Dan Treacy

Television Personalities singles chronology
"14th Floor" (1978)	"Part Time Punks" (1980)	"I Know Where Syd Barrett Lives" (1981)

"Part Time Punks" is a song by the English post-punk group Television Personalities. It initially appeared on their 1978 EP Where's Bill Grundy Now?, and was released by Rough Trade Records as a single in 1980. The song was written by the band's lead singer Dan Treacy and satirises the latecomer, fashion-oriented, so-called "plastic" punks who emerged after the UK punk rock movement became mainstream.

The track appeared as part of the 1978 four-song EP Where's Bill Grundy Now?, recorded in four hours at a cost of £22 on the band's own label Kings Road. It was released as a single in 1980 by Rough Trade and sold 27,000 copies in its first year and bringing Television Personalities to prominence within the then-emerging UK independent music scene. Although it is one of the band's best-selling records, Treacy came to regard the track as a millstone and somewhat of a novelty song.

== Background ==
The Television Personalities' vocalist and songwriter Dan Treacy was born and raised in Beaufort Market on the King's Road in Chelsea, London, an area described by the author and critic David Cavanagh as the "birthplace of punk". Their apartment was located opposite the fashion designer Vivienne Westwood and the Sex Pistols' manager Malcolm McLaren's "Sex boutique", which specialised in clothing often credited with establishing the aesthetic of the punk movement. Treacy was thus aware of punk rock from its earliest beginnings. His mother did laundry for the Sex boutique, and so he would regularly see musicians such as the Sex Pistols' guiratist Steve Jones, Charlie Watts and Diana Dors". (Note: Through her contacts at Sex, Treacy's mother was able to get him a job as a gofer at Led Zeppelin's record label Swan song. He said this mainly involved "running errands carrying cocaine up and down the Fulham Palace Road".)

Treacy was inspired to form the band after hearing the Sex Pistols. Unconventional by nature, he has admitted that he was not very interested in music at the time, and the band rarely rehearsed. (Note: The band were struggling to find a name; early suggestions included the names of well-known but by then old-fashioned UK TV hosts such as Nicholas Parsons, Russell Harty, Bruce Forsyth and Hughie Green. They eventually decided on the related but generic "Television Personalities".)

== Recording ==
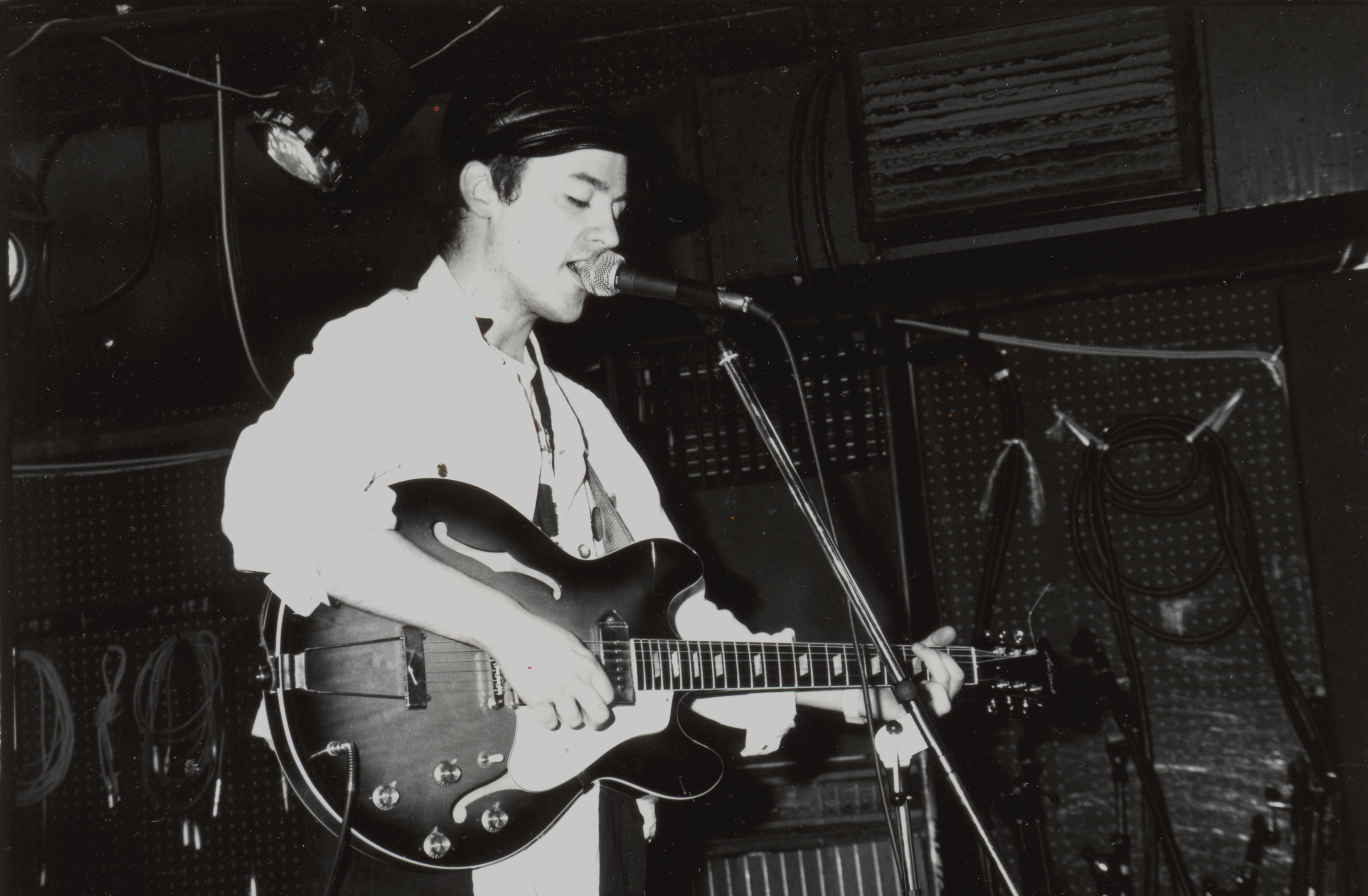
Dan Treacy performing with Television Personalities, 1994

The band's first recorded tracks, "14th Floor" (Note: Although Treacy and his parents actually lived on the seventh floor of their towerblock.) and "Oxford Street, came about after Treacy borrowed £18 from his parents to pay for off-peak studio time in Hammersmith, London. Both songs were well received by critics. (Note: "14th Floor" was chosen for airplay by The Clash's singer Joe Strummer during a guest appearance on Peel's evening show.) Their second release, the four-track EP Where's Bill Grundy Now? was recorded in just four hours at a cost of £22, and released on their own King Road record label. The EP consists of "Part Time Punks", the title track, "Happy Families" and "Posing at the Roundhouse". Referring to its amateurish musicianship and production, in 2006 the critic Bill Meyer said "playful demeanor, charming early-Kinks-style melodies, and on-the-cheap proto-indie-rock production values".

Treacy wanted to release "Part Time Punks" as a single but misjudged production costs. After the recording and mastering were complete, he was unable to press any vinyl copies, leaving him with only two acetates. He sent a copy to the influential BBC Radio 1 DJ John Peel, who played the track four times over the following 12 months and offered the band a Peel Session. Peel was disappointed when he heard that the song had been left out in favour of newer material, saying: "Oh, it's such a shame that children have to grow up".

== Music and lyrics ==
"Part Time Punks"
Sample of the opening verse with the lyrics "Walking down the King's Road, I see so many faces, they come from many places".

"Part Time Punks" was written by Treacy and recorded in the band's characteristic low-fi and deliberately "shambolic" style. Its lyrics incorporate vernacular language and are sung with a pronounced Cockney accent. Adding to the amateurish tone, Treacy and Ball appear to struggle with keeping their vocal harmonies in tune.

The song takes a critical and wry look at the evolution of UK punk rock from its underground beginnings in 1976 to the more commercialised, mainstream style that had emerged by 1978. According to the critic Rob Young, the lyrics reflects the "transference of the earnest imperatives behind punk rock into a pastiche" and satires "the cartoon-mohican punk rockers that had taken over the King's Road as helpless fashion victims ignorant of the founding spirit of punk rock." Writing for LA Weekly in 2006, the critic Lina Lecaro said that the song criticises "poseurs and late adopters...who rock the look only on the weekend". Treacy re-explored the theme in the title track of the 1995 album "I Was a Mod Before You Was a Mod".

"Part Time Punks" mentions several contemporary bands, music industry people and record labels, including Siouxsie and the Banshees, John Peel and Rough Trade Records. However, Treacy has said that the song wasn't intended to criticise them directly, but rather the general media hype that took them into the mainstream press. Asked in a 1980 interview with Sounds magazine if he was once a part-time punk, Treacy said: "Oh Christ yeah, I'm the worst of the lot...everybody takes it too seriously."

== Release ==
Geoff Travis, head of Rough Trade Records, contacted Treacy and offered a contract to both distribute the EP and release "Part Time Punks" as a single. Travis was not put-off by the band's "barely competent" musical style, and offered a very favourable, informal and non-binding distribution and record deal, described by Ball as an "old-fashioned, spit and shake, 50-50 deal. Share the risk and share the profits".

The Where's Bill Grundy Now? EP was rereleased by Rough Trade in 1979 and sold between 20,000 and 30,000 copies. The "Part Time Punks" single was released the following year and reached the UK Independent Chart, selling 14,000 copies in its first six months, leading to a pressing of a further 13,000 copies. The song brought the band international attention and led to tours of America, Germany and Holland.

== Reception ==
"Part Time Punks" has become a cult hit and has been widely influential. According to the writer Simon Reynolds, the song serves as a self-referential meta-critique that addresses the nature of the punk movement itself. The writer Kelefa Sanneh said that with "Part Time Punks", "Dan Treacy led what sounded like a bedroom sing-along, poking fun at young people practising their punk moves at home. The verses were rather judgmental, but by the time he got to the chorus, Treacy sounded more like a small boy watching a delightful parade." Elements of its style were adopted by UK indie bands such as Belle and Sebastian and Arctic Monkeys. It appeared on the 1995 TVP early singles and B-sides compilation "Yes Darling, But Is It Art", while the 1999 album "Part Time Punks: The Very Best Of Television Personalities" was titled after the song.

Treacy said in a 2010 interview that "Part Time Punks" and their debut album "...And Don't the Kids Just Love It" were the band's most commercially successful releases. He said that at the time "I was absolutely minted, big record, big album. The money came too young. "Part Time Punks" done getting on 100,000, not that I see anything for it these days. I may do eventually."

== Personnel ==
- Dan Treacy – vocals, production
- Ed Ball – guitar
- Mark Sheppard – drums

== Citations ==
- Baal, Iphgenia (24 August 2014). "Daniel Treacy as seen on Screen". Dazed & Confused. Archived from the original on 2 July 2018.
- Berton, Benjamin (2022). Dreamworld: The fabulous life of Daniel Treacy and his band Television Personalities. Mainz: Black Dog Publishing. ISBN 978-3-9557-5621-5.
- Birch, Ian (10 February 1979). "Rough Trade Records: The Humane Sell". Melody Maker.
- Bushell, Gary (20 January 1979). "These Men Are Part-Time Punks". Sounds.
- Cavanagh, David (2000). The Creation Records Story: My Magpie Eyes Are Hungry for the Prize. London: Virgin Books. ISBN 0-7535-0645-9.
- Davidson, Chris (1982). "TV Personalities: Interview with Dan Treacy". Slow Dazzle Fanzine.
- Gere, Charlie (2022). World's End (Spatial Politics). London: Goldsmiths, University of London. ISBN 978-1-9133-8000-7.
- Green, Thomas (27 June 2010). "Q&A: Musician Dan Treacy". The Arts Desk.
- Lecaro, Lina (31 May 2006). "Part Time Punks, full-time fun!". LA Weekly. Archived from the original on 14 July 2018.
- Marsh, Calum (26 January 2018). "Beautiful Despair". Pitchfork. Archived from the original on 13 May 2018.
- Meyer, Bill (20 April 2006). "It Beats Prison". Chicago Reader.
- Quantick, David (11 February 1984). "Personality People Reveal The Painted Word". NME.
- Robbins, Ira (16 February 2005). "Television Personalities". Trouser Press. Archived from the original on 16 February 2007.
- Sanneh, Kelefa (2021). Major Labels: A History of Popular Music in Seven Genres. Edinburgh: Canongate. ISBN 978-1-8388-5593-2.
- Sanneh, Kelefa (6 September 2021). "The Education of a Part-Time Punk". The New Yorker. Archived from the original on 17 June 2025.
- Reynolds, Simon (2005). Rip It Up and Start Again: Postpunk 1978–1984. London: Faber and Faber. ISBN 0-1430-3672-6.
- Weisbard, Eric (1996). Spin Alternative Record Guide. New York: Vintage Books. ISBN 0-6797-5574-8.
- Wolk, Douglas (12 March 2006). "A Full-Time Punk Again". New York Times.
- Young, Ron (2006). Rough Trade: Labels Unlimited. London: Black Dog Publishing. ISBN 1-9047-7247-1.
