= Pop Goes Art! =

Studio album by The Times
- Released: January 1982
- Recorded: June – July 1981
- Genre: Post-punk, indie
- Label: Whaam! Records

The Times chronology
Pop Goes Art! (1982)	This Is London (1983)

Pop Goes Art! is the debut album of English band The Times. It was recorded in the summer of 1981 and released in 1982. A previous album, Go! with the Times was recorded in November 1980, but not issued until 1985.

== Track listing ==
Side A

1. "Picture Gallery"
2. "Biff! Bang! Pow!"
3. "It's Time!"
4. "If Now Is the Answer"
5. "A New Arrangement"
6. "Looking at the World Through Dark Shades"
7. "I Helped Patrick McGoohan Escape"

Side B

1. "Pop Goes Art! (Melody in Mono)"
2. "Miss London"
3. "The Sun Never Sets"
4. "Easy as Pie"
5. "This Is Tomorrow...."

== Personnel ==
- John East
- Paul Damien
- Edward Ball
- Daniel Treacy
