= The Social Icons =

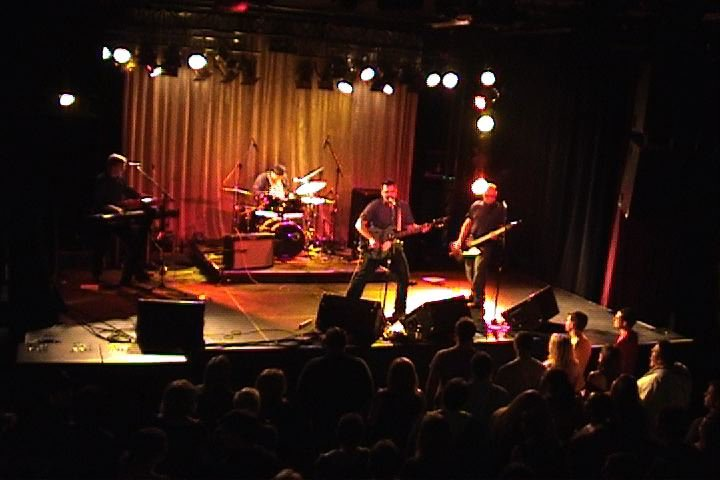

Background information
- Origin: Canada
- Genres: Indie pop Power Pop; Surf; Mod
- Instruments: Vocals, 6 String Acoustic & Electric guitars, E-Bow, Bass, Drums, Hammond organ, Wurlitzer organ
- Years active: 2009–present
- Label: The Beautiful Music
- Members: Nick Danger; CHUNKK; Terry O'Reilly

The Social Icons are a Canadian indie rock band formed in 2009 in Ottawa. Formed by Nickolai Dangeroso (formerly Nick Danger) who is the principal songwriter as well as vocalist and guitarist. The other members of the band are Terry O'Reilly on bass guitar and CHUNKK on percussion. They are one of the original artists on Ottawa based indie label, The Beautiful Music along with Skytone (band).

After the breakup Nick Danger and the Danger City Rebels and departure of original bassist "Popsicle" Pete Connell, they recruited ex-Tremolo bassist Terry O'Reilly. Although they played a few more gigs as Nick Danger, they agreed that the DCR was over. The sonic direction of their music had evolved. Dangeroso's original surf/rock sound had broadened to include other influences, including O'Reilly's 1990s grunge-rock inspired bass stylings and Nielson's funk-infused drum beats.

In late 2008, they released their debut EP on German record label Vollwert Records Berlin. This was followed up in 2010 by their 14 track CD I'm there...you're here. Both albums featured Mike Dubue of the Hilotrons/Kepler (band) and was recorded at Bovasound in Ottawa.

The Social Icons songs have charted on Canadian campus radio charts and have been in rotation on CBC and international indie radio stations.

== Discography ==
- The Social Icons (2009) Vollwert Records Berlin
- I'm there...you're here (2010) The Beautiful Music
