= Sad but True (disambiguation) =

"Sad but True" is a 1993 song by American heavy metal band Metallica.

Sad but True may also refer to:

- Sad but True (The Times album), 1997
- Sad but True (Tex, Don and Charlie album), 1993
- Sad But True... (슬프지만 진실…), 2000 album by Delispice
- Sad But True: The Secret History of Country Music Songwriting, a series of albums by New Zealand musicians Marlon Williams and Delaney Davidson
- "Sad but True", a song by Siege from Drop Dead (1984)
- "Sad but True", a song by Orbital from Snivilisation (1994)
