= E for Edward =

Studio album by The Times
- Released: October 1989
- Genre: Post punk, indie
- Label: Creation Records
- Producer: Edward Ball

The Times chronology
Beat Torture (1988)	E for Edward (1989)	Et Dieu Créa La Femme (1990)

E for Edward is the eighth album by West London Post punk and Indie band The Times released in 1989.

== Track listing ==
- Vinil version (Creation Records - CRELP 053)

Side A

1. Manchester
2. Valvaline
3. Snow
4. Catherine Wheel
5. Crashed on You

Side B

1. Count to Five
2. DJ Krush’s Matsuri
3. French Film Bleurred
4. No Love on Haight Street
5. Acid Angel of Ecstasy
- CD version (Creation Records - CRECD 053)
1. Manchester - 04:22
2. Valvaline - 04:54
3. Snow - 04:27
4. Catherine Wheel - 03:06
5. Crashed on You - 04:57
6. Count to Five - 05:35
7. DJ Krush’s Matsuri - 04:41
8. French Film Bleurred - 05:47
9. No Love on Haight Street - 03:05
10. Acid Angel of Ecstasy - 03:58
11. Gold - 04:08
12. Sold - 04:33
13. Life - 04:40

== Personnel ==
- Edward Ball (vocals, guitar, acoustic guitar)
- Paul Heeren (guitar)
