= 'O' Level =

British punk rock and indie band

- Origin: West London, England
- Genres: Punk rock; post-punk; indie pop
- Years active: 1976–1980
- Labels: Artpop! Records; King's Road Records; Psycho Records
- Past members: Ed Ball; John Bennett; Gerard Bennett; Richard Scully
- Website: http://www.myspace.com/olevel

'O' Level were a British punk and indie band, founded in 1976 by Ed Ball with friends John and Gerard Bennett. The group's name refers to the 'O'-Level of the British General Certificate of Education.

== History ==
Along with the early Television Personalities, 'O' Level's singles are synonymous with a late 1970s DIY-indie sound that emanated from West London, mostly because the personnel of both bands were almost identical.

Fuelled by punk and the early Beatles, 'O' Level was formed in 1976 by Ed Ball with friends from the London Oratory School, John and Gerard Bennett, on drums and bass guitar respectively. Together they played at school discos and youth centres, until fellow school friend Daniel Treacy invited Ball to join him in the studio to record a single. Ball brought John and Gerard as well, resulting in the TV Personalities single, "14th Floor".

The following week, Ball, the Bennetts and friend Richard Scully recorded "Pseudo Punk", "O Levels" and "East Sheen" as 'O' Level, released in November 1977. It took Treacy longer to raise the pre-requisite funds to press "14th floor", which was finally released in 1978. In March of that year, John and Gerard Bennett started their own band Reacta, leaving Ball with the name 'O' Level.

A year after their debut recording sessions, Treacy and Ball returned to the studio, this time to create the breakthrough Where's Bill Grundy Now EP as the TV Personalities, featuring the song "Part Time Punks" (in which 'O' Level are mentioned). The following week, Ball went back to record – this time by himself – a second and final 'O' Level release, The Malcolm McLaren Lifestory EP, featuring "We Love Malcolm". Both EPs appeared in late 1978.

There was subsequently a name change to the Teenage Filmstars and invitations to Daniel Treacy and Joseph Foster.

== Discography ==
=== Compilations ===
- 1977 – 1980 A Day in the Life of Gilbert and George (CD) (1992), Rev-Ola (CREV 005CD)

=== Singles and EPs ===
- "East Sheen" (7") (1978), Psycho Records (PSYCHO 1)
- The Malcolm McLaren Life Story EP (7") (1978), Kings Road Records (KR 002)

== See also ==
- The Times (band)

== Sources ==
- Berton, Benjamin (2022). Dreamworld: The fabulous life of Daniel Treacy and his band Television Personalities. Mainz: Black Dog Publishing. ISBN 978-3-9557-5621-5.
