= Et Dieu créa la femme =

Studio album by The Times
- Released: 1990
- Genre: Post punk, indie
- Label: Creation; CRE 070

The Times chronology
E for Edward (1989)	Et Dieu créa la femme (1990)	Pure (1991)

Et Dieu créa la femme is the ninth album by West London post punk and indie band The Times released in 1990.

== Track listing ==
=== LP (Creation Records – CRELP 070) ===
==== Side A ====
1. "Septième ciel" – 04:46
2. "Aurore boréale" – 04:56
3. "Confiance" – 04:16
4. "Chagrin d'amour" – 04:47
5. "Volupté" – 04:46

==== Side B ====
1. "Baisers volés" – 02:27
2. "Pour Kylie" – 04:26
3. "Sucette" – 04:18
4. "1990 année erotique" – 04:43
5. "Extase" – 03:17

=== CD (Creation Records – CRECD 070) ===
1. "Septième ciel" – 04:46
2. "Aurore Boréale" – 04:56
3. "Confiance" – 04:16
4. "Chagrin d'amour" – 04:47
5. "Volupté" – 04:46
6. "Baisers volés" – 02:27
7. "Pour Kylie" – 04:26
8. "Sucette" – 04:18
9. 1990 Année Erotique" – 04:43
10. Extase – 03:17
11. "I Helped Patrick McGoohan Escape (Thanks for the Trip Dad)" – 3:31
12. untitled bonus tracks – 4:25

== Personnel ==
- Edward Ball – vocals, guitar, acoustic guitar
- Paul Heeren – guitar
