= My Dark Places =

My Dark Places may refer to:

- My Dark Places (book), a 1996 non-fiction book by American crime-fiction writer James Ellroy
- My Dark Places (album), a 2006 British album by the Television Personalities
