= Enjoy the Times =

Studio album by The Times
- Released: 1986
- Genre: Post punk, indie
- Label: Artpop! Records - ART 15

The Times chronology
Up Against It (1986)	Enjoy the Times (1986)	Beat Torture (1988)

Enjoy the Times is the sixth album by West London Post punk and Indie band The Times released in 1986.

== Track listing ==
Side A

1. Britannia Sleeps Tonight
2. Something Like the Truth
3. [Where to Go] When the Sun Goes Down
4. Times TV
5. Housewives Law
6. Think Big!
7. The Third Wave

Side B

1. The American Way
2. Winning Hearts and Minds
3. Cousin Frank Goes to Hollywood
4. Enjoy
5. Dream Now [Young America]
6. Times Radio
7. When the Talking Had to Stop
