= Mathew Sawyer =

British visual artist and musician (born 1977)

Mathew John Sawyer (born 1977, Hammersmith, England) is a British visual artist and musician, who lives and works in London. Sawyer studied at Chelsea College of Art and Design and the Royal College of Art in London.

His band Mathew Sawyer and The Ghosts were signed to Fire Records. They have three albums available: Blue Birds Blood (2007) originally released on Stolen Recordings and Catbird Records (US), How Snakes Eat (2010) and Sleep Dreamt A Brother (2013).

Sawyer was a member of Television Personalities for their 2006 album My Dark Places, released on Domino Records. In 2007, Mathew Sawyer and The Ghosts played the Queen Elizabeth Hall as part of the Meltdown Festival.

Sawyer's artwork has been shown internationally in both solo and group exhibitions, including The Distance Between Me and You (Lisson Gallery), Documentary Creations (Museum of Art Luzern), Protest and Survive (Whitechapel Art Gallery) and Frieze Art Fair.
