= Nick Danger and the Danger City Rebels =

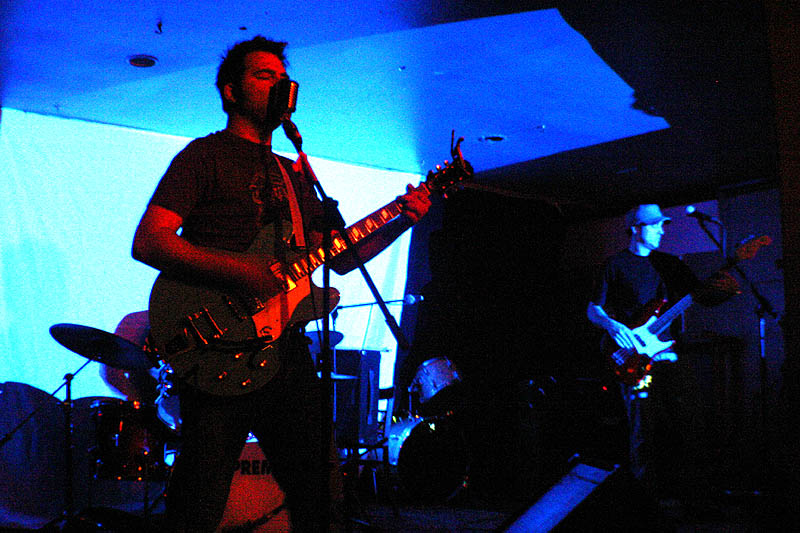

Background information
- Origin: Ottawa, Ontario, Canada
- Genres: Rock, proto-punk, garage rock
- Years active: 2000–2007
- Labels: The Beautiful Music
- Members: Nick Danger; Popsicle Pete Connell; CHUNKK

Nick Danger and the Danger City Rebels were a Canadian rock band led by Nick Danger in the 2000s.

The original band, was billed as "The Social Icons" in 2000, before developing the Nick Danger persona and becoming The Danger City Rebels (DCR). It featured Nick Danger and drummer CHUNKK Neilson (recruited from Ottawa band Tremolo). The sound of the band owed a great deal to the influence of The Velvet Underground, Hank Williams, and The Ventures, and balanced somewhere between "Cowpunk" and "surf rock".

The second band signed to Ottawa's The Beautiful Music record label. Their series of recordings entitled "Thrillogy of Danger" was a three EP set of CDs. The first was titled The Return of Nick Danger and the third was titled Escape from Danger City. According to Allan Wigney in the April 5, 2006 interview, the second album was never released due to legal issues.

== Discography ==
=== Thrillogy of Danger ===
- The Return of Nick Danger (2004)
- Escape from Danger City (2006)
- I'm There You're Here (as Nickolai Dangeroso) (2010)
- Sweet Magnolias (2017)

== See also ==
- The Social Icons
