= Teenage Filmstars =

English band

- Origin: West London, England
- Genres: Post-punk, indie, experimental, psychedelic
- Years active: 1979–1980,1992–1999
- Spinoffs: The Times
- Members: Ed Ball; Daniel Treacy; Joseph Foster; Paul Damian
- Website: http://www.myspace.com/teenagefilmstars

Teenage Filmstars were an English post-punk, psychedelic band, formed in 1979 by Ed Ball, Daniel Treacy and Joseph Foster. The band segued into the Times in 1980, re-appearing on Creation Records in 1992.

== Teenage Filmstars 1979-1980 ==
Having recorded and released the last 'O' Level single "We Love Malcolm" (1978) by himself, Edward Ball dropped the name in favour of the Teenage Filmstars, spring 1979. Opting to record as a band again, he invited old school friends Daniel Treacy and Joseph Foster to guest on the first single, "(There's a) Cloud Over Liverpool" (1979). Already championed by Radio 1 DJ John Peel, the record also received attention more than a year later when American record shops and college radio stations mistook it for a tribute to the recent death of John Lennon. Followed by "The Odd Man Out" (1980), which highlighted Ball's musical ability to mimic contemporary pop music at will, especially ska and electropop, the Teenage Filmstars and TV Personalities played their first live shows with Ball playing in both groups. During this period of exposing newly written compositions to live audiences (sometimes even making them up on the spot) Treacy and Ball nominated personal figureheads that almost personified their own destinies - Teenage Filmstars "I Helped Patrick McGoohan Escape" (1980) and the TV Personalities "I Know Where Syd Barrett Lives" (1981).

As the Teenage Filmstars began recording their debut album in November 1980, Ball once again changed the band's name, this time to The Times. These sessions eventually appeared as "Go! With The Times" (1985).

== Teenage Filmstars 1992-1999 ==
The Teenage Filmstars reappeared twelve years later with the album 'Lift Off Mit Der Teenage Filmstars' (AKA 'Star' 1992) on Creation Records. Partly bearing witness to My Bloody Valentine's release 'Loveless' from the previous year, the forthcoming progressive 90's psychedelia and Ball's own troubled vision of popular music, it prompted Kevin Shields to remark of Ball in 1995, "A sensitive soul from another planet. A modernist musical alchemist - where other people struggle Ed plays what we're thinking." Following their debut they released "Rocket Charms" (1993), a tighter concept though perhaps suffering from this as a result. On "Ssenkcis Rou Troppus Drocer Ruo Yub" aka "Buy Our Record Support Our Sickness" (1997), the Teenage Filmstars fulfill the ambitious psychedelic album concept, and haul in an avant-garde sixties / seventies progressive rock hybrid.

== Discography ==
=== Studio albums ===
- Lift Off mit der Teenage Filmstars aka Star (LP & CD Creation Records, 1992)
- Rocket Charms (LP & CD Creation Records, 1993)
- Buy Our Record, Support Our Sickness (LP Creation Records, 1997)
- Bring Back the Cartel (LP Creation Records, 1999) (a reference to The Cartel)

=== Compilations ===
- 1977–1980 A Day in the Life of Gilbert and George (CD Rev-Ola, 1992)
- Here's to Old England! (2005)

=== Singles & EPs ===
- "(There's A) Cloud Over Liverpool" (7" Clockwork Records, 1979)
- "The Odd Man Out" (7" Wessex Records, 1980)
- "I Helped Patrick McGoohan Escape" (7" Fab Listening Records, 1980)

== See also ==
- Creation Records
- Television Personalities
