= Hello Europe =

Studio album by The Times
- Released: 1984
- Genre: Post-punk, indie
- Label: Artpop! Records - ART 17
- Producer: Ian Shaw and The Times

The Times chronology
This Is London (1983)	Hello Europe (1984)	Go! With The Times (1985)

Hello Europe is the third album by West London post-punk and indie band The Times released in 1984.

== Track listing ==
Side A

1. Radiate
2. Blue Fire
3. Victory Drums
4. Everything Turns To Black And White
5. Boys Brigade

Side B

1. Where The Blue Begins
2. Public Reaction Killed This Cat
3. Faith
4. Things Weve Learnt
5. Kulturshock

== Personnel ==
- John East (bass, vocals)
- Paul Damien (drums, vocals)
- Edward Ball (vocals, guitar)
- The Rhinoceros Horns (horns)
- Anthony Thistlethwaite (saxophone)
- Barbara Snow (trumpet)
