= Pure (The Times album) =

Studio album by The Times
- Released: 1991
- Genre: Post punk, indie
- Label: Creation Records - CRECD 091

The Times chronology
Et Dieu Créa La Femme (1990)	Pure (1991)	The Times At The Astradome (1992)

Pure is the tenth album by West London Post punk and Indie band The Times released in 1991.

== Track listing ==
- Side A - Brown Ball (19:45)
1. From Chelsea Green To Brighton Beach
2. A Girl Called Mersey
3. A From L.A. to Edgbaston
4. Lundi Bleu
- Side B - Pink Ball (20:42)
1. A Beautiful Village Called England
2. Ours Is a Wonderlove World
3. Another Star in Heaven

== Personnel ==
- Edward Ball (vocals, guitar, acoustic guitar)
- Richard Green (guitar)
- Paul Heeren (guitar)
