= The Beautiful Music =

- Founded: 2002
- Founder: Wally Salem
- Genre: Indie pop
- Country of origin: Canada
- Location: Ottawa, Ontario
- Official website: thebeautifulmusic.com

The Beautiful Music (TBM) is a Canadian record label started in 2002 by Wally Salem, specializing in indie pop, post-mod, and janglewave. Acts include Skytone, Nick Danger & the Danger City Rebels, The Mules, Jeremy Gluck, Dot Dash, Roy Moller, The Yellow Melodies, The Higher Elevations and The Social Icons.

TBM's releases include a multi-volume series in tribute to the Television Personalities.

== Discography/Catalogue ==
- Tremolo - All My Friends EP 2002
- Nick Danger & the Danger City Rebels - The Return of Nick Danger EP 2003
- The Mules - Live At The Old Town Hall 2004
- Into the Jet Stream of Pop - An International Pop Compilation 2004
- If I Could Write Poetry - A Tribute to the Television Personalities 2004
- The Higher Elevations - Lovestruck EP 2004
- Skytone - Echoes in All Directions LP 2005
- Someone to Share My Life With LP Vinyl - The Alternate Tribute to the Television Personalities 2005 (split release with Art Pop Records)
- Nick Danger & the Danger City Rebels - Escape from Danger City EP 2006
- I Would Write a Thousand Words - A Tribute to the Television Personalities Vol. 2 2007
- Jeremy Gluck - This Is 2008 The Barracudas
- Armstrong - Songs About the Weather 2009
- The Social Icons - I'm there...you're here 2010
- Dot Dash - Spark>Flame>Ember>Ash 2011
- Dot Dash - Winter Garden Light 2012
