= Go! with the Times =

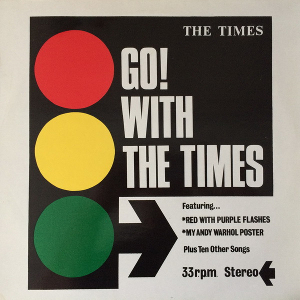

Studio album by The Times
- Released: 1985
- Recorded: 1980
- Genre: Post-punk, indie
- Label: Pastell Records - Pow 3

The Times chronology
Hello Europe (1984)	Go! with the Times (1985)	Up Against It (1986)

Go! with the Times is an album recorded in November 1980 but released in 1985 by West London post-punk/indie band the Times.

== Track listing ==
Side A

1. "You Can Get It"
2. "I'm with You"
3. "Your Generation"
4. "Pinstripes"
5. "Dressing Up for the Cameras"
6. "Red with Purple Flashes"

Side B

1. "The Jokes on Zandra"
2. "Nowhere to Run"
3. "No Hard Feelings"
4. "My Andy Warhol Poster"
5. "Man from Uncle"
6. "Reflections in an Imperfect Mirror"

== Personnel ==
- John East (bass, vocals)
- Paul Damien (drums, vocals)
- Edward Ball (vocals, guitar)
