= The Nightblooms =

Dutch alternative rock band

- Origin: Deventer, Netherlands
- Genres: Alternative rock, shoegazing, indie rock, indie pop
- Years active: 1987–1996
- Labels: Dingo Records, Fierce Recordings, Fire Records, Paperhouse
- Past members: Esther Sprikkelman; Harry Otten; Petra van Tongeren; Leon Morselt; Michael van der Woude

The Nightblooms were a Dutch alternative rock band.

== History ==
The band formed in 1987 in Deventer, The Netherlands as a quartet of vocalist Esther Sprikkelman, guitarist Harry Otten, bassist Petra van Tongeren and drummer Leon Morselt. Morselt and Van Tongeren were previously members of Three Clouds in the Sky, who had issued a 1985 EP, A Long Forgotten Day., while Otten had played in Alerta, whose album In the Land of a Thousand Pretty Dreams was issued in 1983 by Welfare Factory Records.

The Nightblooms' first release was the "Go Eliza" single, released in 1988 on Dingo Records. They then signed to Fierce Recordings, releasing the 1990 single "Crystal Eyes", and the Butterfly Girl EP, before releasing an eponymous debut album in 1992. They also recorded a session for John Peel's BBC Radio 1 show in 1990, with Michael van der Woude added on guitar.

They moved on to Fire Records, who reissued the band's debut album on their Paperhouse label; this was followed by 24 Days at Catastrofe Café in September 1993. The band split in 1996.

Sprikkelman and Otten started a new band, Safe Home, who issued two albums, You Can't Undo What's Already Undid (2002) and The Wide Wide World And All We Know (2005), as well as several singles.

Sprikkelman later recorded with Telefunk and Willard Grant Conspiracy.

== Discography ==
=== Studio albums ===
- The Nightblooms (1992, Fierce Recordings; reissued Paperhouse/Seed)
- 24 Days at Catastrophe Café (1993, Fire Records/Seed)

=== Live albums ===
- Live (1992, Fierce Recordings)

=== Singles and EPs ===
- "Go Eliza" (1988, Dingo Records)
- "Crystal Eyes" (1990, Fierce Recordings)
- Butterfly Girl EP (1992, Fierce Recordings)
- "Starcatcher" (1992, Fire Records)
- "Never Dream at All" (1993, Fire Records)
- "Hold On" (1994, Fire Records)
- "Love Is Gone" (1995, Fire Records)
