= Beat Torture =

Studio album by The Times
- Released: 1988
- Genre: Post punk, indie
- Label: Creation Records - CRELP 038
- Producer: Alan McGee

The Times chronology
Up Against It (1986)	Beat Torture (1988)	E For Edward (1989)

Beat Torture is the seventh album by West London Post punk and Indie band The Times released in 1988.

== Track listing ==
Side A

1. Godevil - 04:40
2. Heaven Sent Me an Angel - 04:14
3. I'll Be Your Volunteer - 02:57
4. Department Store - 03:27
5. Love Like Haze or Rain - 06:36

Side B

1. It Had to Happen - 04:09
2. Chelsea Green - 03:48
3. How to Start Your Own Country - 03:58
4. On the Peace Line - 03:24
5. Scarlet and Sapphire - 04:24

+ tracks on CD

1. Angel - 04:13
2. Volunteer - 03:36
3. Country - 04:04
4. Love - 05:48
