= The Rose of Avalanche =

English band

- Origin: Leeds, West Yorkshire, England
- Genres: Alternative rock, post-punk, Gothic Rock
- Years active: 1984–1993, 2019–present
- Labels: Leeds Independent, Fire, Avalantic
- Past members: Philip Morris; Paul James Berry; Glenn Schultz; Alan Davis; Nicol Mackay; Mark Thompson; Darren Horner; Andrew Porter; Ade Clark; David Wolfenden
- Website: www.roseofavalanche.com

The Rose of Avalanche is an English rock band from Leeds, West Yorkshire, formed in 1984. They have released ten albums.

== History ==
The band was formed by Phil Morris, Paul James Berry and Alan Davis. The name came from the "rose" for the beauty and the "avalanche" for the power, as a way of describing their music.

Before they had played a gig they signed to local independent label LiL, and released two singles: "LA Rain" and "Goddess". Both made the Top 20 of the UK Independent Chart, with "LA Rain" also featuring in John Peel's Festive Fifty in 1985.

After this initial success, Fire Records signed the band and the personnel changed. The lineup became Phil Morris, Paul James Berry, Glenn Schultz, Nicol McKay, and Mark Thompson. Mass market exposure came with the support slot on The Mission's 1986–87 World Crusade Tour. This lineup released a further five singles and the first official studio album – Never Another Sunset in 1989.

Shultz and McKay left the band in 1989, and new bass player Darren Horner was recruited to replace McKay. This lineup released one EP "A Peace Inside". Further personnel changes occurred in 1990 with Thompson leaving to be replaced by Andy Porter. The final lineup then delivered one EP and two albums, String A Beads in 1990, and ICE in 1991. Before permanently breaking up, the band played live once more in 1993. The lineup consisted of Morris, Horner, and Schultz, and a drum machine.

In 2019, they announced that the band would reform.

== Discography ==
=== Albums ===
- Rose of Avalanche (1985), Contempo
- First Avalanche (1986), Leeds Independent Label - UK Indie No. 3
- Always There (1987), Fire
- In Rock (1988), Fire - UK Indie No. 10
- Anthology (1988), Fire
- Live at Town and Country (1988), Contempo
- Never Another Sunset (1989), Avalantic - UK Indie No. 10
- String 'a' Beads (1990), Avalantic
- I.C.E. (1991), Avalantic
- LA Rain - The Singles Album (1997), Nectar Records

=== Singles, EPs ===
- "L.A. Rain" (1985), Leeds Independent Label - UK Indie No. 10
- "Goddess" (1985), Leeds Independent Label - UK Indie No. 16
- "Too Many Castles In the Sky" (1986), Fire - UK Indie No. 8
- "Velveteen" (1986), Fire - UK Indie No. 9
- "Always There" (1987), Fire - UK Indie No. 3
- Too Many Castles in the Sky/Velveteen double 7-inch EP Re-issue(1987), Fire
- "The World Is Ours" (1988), Avalantic - UK Indie No. 8
- "Never Another Sunset" (1989), Avalantic - UK Indie No. 19
- A Peace Inside EP (1989), Avalantic
- I Believe (1990), Rebel Rec
