= Beautiful Despair =

Studio album by Television Personalities
- Released: 26 January 2018
- Recorded: 1990
- Studios: Jowe Head's flat, Glading Terrace, Stoke Newington, London
- Length: 47:46
- Label: Fire
- Producer: Jowe Head

Television Personalities chronology
A Memory Is Better Than Nothing (2010)	Beautiful Despair (2018)

Professional ratings
Aggregate scores
Source	Rating
Metacritic	83/100
Review scores
Source	Rating
AllMusic	4/5 stars

Beautiful Despair is the twelfth studio album by English band Television Personalities. The album was originally recorded in 1990 on a 4-track, between their albums Privilege (1990) and Closer to God (1992). It was released in January 2018 on Fire Records.

== Track listing ==
All words and music by Daniel Treacy

No.	Title	Length
1.	"Hard Luck Story Number 39"	3:02
2.	"Razor Blades & Lemonade"	3:03
3.	"How Does It Feel to Be Loved ?"	2:39
4.	"Beautiful Despair"	3:12
5.	"Love Is a Four Letter Word"	3:17
6.	"If You Fly Too High"	2:39
7.	"I Get Frightened Too"	3:49
8.	"Goodnight Mr Spaceman"	2:43
9.	"Honey for the Bears"	3:53
10.	"I Don't Want to Live This Life"	3:01
11.	"I Like That in a Girl"	1:46
12.	"My Very First Nervous Breakdown"	4:03
13.	"I Suppose You Think It's Funny"	2:31
14.	"Have a Nice Day"	3:16
15.	"This Heart's Not Made of Stone"	4:52

== Personnel ==
Television Personalities

- Daniel Treacy - lead vocals, 6- and 12-string electric guitars
- Jowe Head - bass guitar, electric and acoustic guitar, analogue synthesizer, autoharp, bowed psaltery, drum machine programming, percussion, backing vocals
