= Alternative Commercial Crossover =

Studio album by The Times
- Released: 1993
- Genre: Post punk, indie
- Label: Creation Records

The Times chronology
The Times At The Astradome (1992)	Alternative Commercial Crossover (1993)	Sad But True (1997)

Alternative Commercial Crossover is the 11th album by West London Post punk and Indie band The Times released in 1993.

== Track listing ==
- Side A
1. The Obligatory Grunge Song - 04:38
2. Finnegans Break - 05:51
3. How Honest Are Pearl Jam? - 03:48
4. Baby Girl - 06:02
5. Ballad Of Georgie Best - 04:14
6. Lundi Bleu (Praise The Lord Mix) - 05:57
- Side B
1. A Palace In The Sun - 04:49
2. Sorry, I've Written A Melody - 07:24
3. Finnegans Break (Corporate Rock Mix) - 06:02
4. The Whole World's Turning Scarface - 05:01
5. All I Want Is You To Care - 06:03

== Personnel ==
- Edward Ball (vocals, guitars, keyboards)
- Paul Heeren (lead and slide guitar, vocals)
- Paul Mulreany (drums, percussion, vocals, guitar)
- Jan Stevens (vocals)
