= The Times at the Astradome Lunaville =

Live album by The Times
- Released: 1992
- Genre: Post-punk, indie
- Label: Creation; CRECD 123
- Producer: Ian Shaw

The Times chronology
Pure (1991)	The Times at the Astradome Lunaville (1992)	Alternative Commercial Crossover (1993)

The Times at the Astradome Lunaville is a live album by West London post-punk and indie band The Times released in 1992.

== Track listing ==
=== Side A: Performance A ===
1. "WellCome" – 01:08
2. "Septieme Ciel" – 04:34
3. "Big Painting" – 04:03
4. "On the Peace Line" – 04:24
5. "Valvaline" – 04:17
6. "Crashed on You" – 04:42

=== Side B: Performance B ===
1. "All Your Life" – 04:21
2. "No Love on Haight St." – 03:11
3. "Love and Truth" – 04:03
4. "Shoom" – 07:22
5. "Manchester" – 02:48
6. "Cloud over Liverpool" – 04:03

== Personnel ==
- Jan Stevens – vocals
- Edward Ball – vocals, guitar, acoustic guitar
- Paul Heeren – guitar
- The Shed – bass
- Paul Mulreany – drums
