= Semion =

Semion is a male Slavic given name. Notable people with the name include:

- Semion Abugov (1877–1950), Jewish, Russian and Soviet painter and art educator
- Semion Alapin (1856–1923), chess master, openings analyst, and puzzle composer
- Semion Belits-Geiman (born 1945), former Soviet freestyle swimmer
- Semion Bogatyrev (1890–1960), Russian musicologist and composer
- Semion Braude (1911–2003), Ukrainian physicist and radio astronomer
- Semion Budionnyi (1883–1973), red cossack, Soviet cavalryman, military commander, politician and close ally of Joseph Stalin
- Semion Chelyuskin (1700–1764), Russian polar explorer and naval officer
- Semion Domash (born 1950), Belarusian politician
- Semion Elistratov (born 1990), Russian short-track speed-skater
- Semion Grigoryevich Frug (1860–1916), multi-lingual Russian poet, lyricist and author
- Semion Furman (1920–1978), Soviet chess International Grandmaster and trainer
- Semion Grossu (born 1934), Moldovan politician and businessman
- Semion Ivanov (1907–1993), Soviet general
- Semion Mogilevich (born 1946), Israeli, Ukrainian-born organized crime boss, believed to be the "boss of bosses" of most Russian Mafia syndicates in the world
- Semion Morozov (1914–1943), commissar of the Taganrog antifascist underground organization (1941–1943)
- Semion G. Murafa (1887–1917), Bessarabian politician in the Russian Empire, also known as a publicist and composer
- Semion Rotnitsky (1915–2004), Soviet Russian painter, Honoured Art worker of Tatar Republic, member of the Saint Petersburg Union of Artists
- Semion Șestopali (1912–2002), Russian-born Romanian and Israeli writer
- Semion Shchedrin (1895–1970), Soviet military commander, senior professional officer of the Red Army when the Soviets invaded Poland in 1939
- Semion Yushkevich (1868–1927), Russian language writer, and playwright and a member of the Moscow literary group Sreda

== See also ==
- Semione
- Siemiony
- Simeon
