= Sad but True (The Times album) =

Studio album by The Times
- Released: 1997
- Recorded: 1987
- Genre: Post-punk, indie
- Label: Rev-Ola Records

The Times chronology
Alternative Commercial Crossover (1993)	Sad but True (1997)	Pirate Playlist (1999)

Sad but True is the 12th album by West London post punk and indie band The Times recorded in 1987 and released in 1997.

== Track listing ==
1. "The Ballad of Me"
2. "Just a Song"
3. "Changing of the Guard"
4. "Almost a Religion"
5. "Obviously One More Disbeliever"
6. "Your Ship Is Almost Built"
7. "Riot House"
8. "See Ya Wouldn't Wanna Be Ya"
9. "Two Hitlers in One Bunker"
10. "Coming from This Heart"
