= Skytone =

SKYTONE
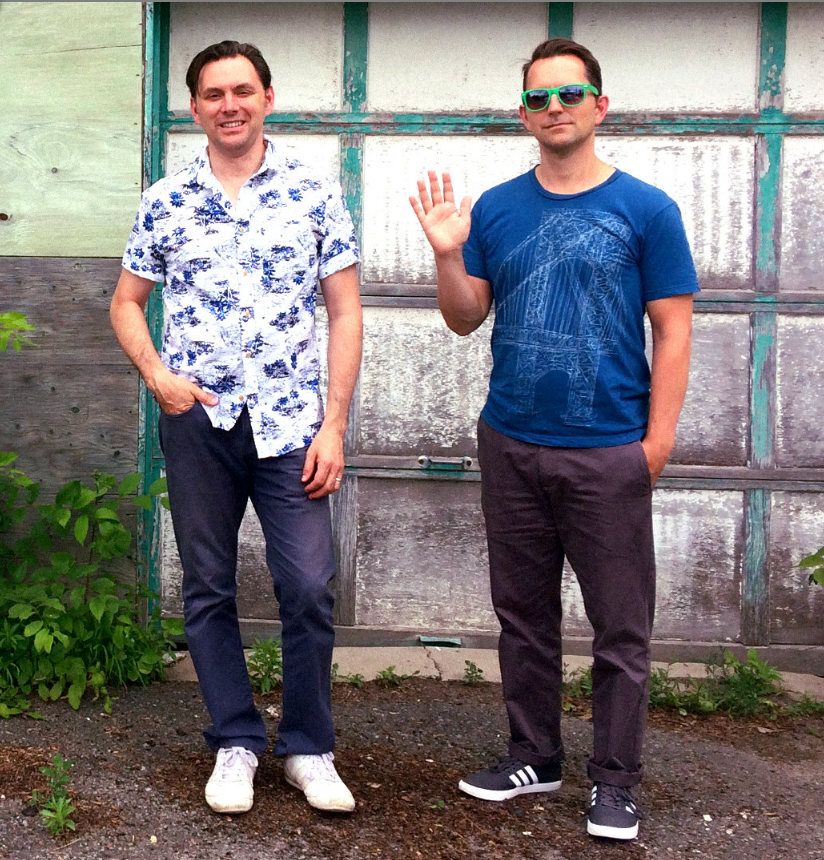

Background information
- Origin: Ottawa, Ontario, Canada
- Genres: Indie pop
- Years active: 2003–present
- Label: The Beautiful Music
- Members: Rodney Doddridge; Darius Doddridge
- Website: Skytone

Skytone are a Canadian duo from Ottawa consisting of brothers Rodney and Darius Doddridge. Their sound is generally considered jangle, indie pop with Rodney and Darius singing and playing all instruments on their albums. Recording and mixing is done at their home studio and albums are produced by Rodney.

All album releases are on the Ottawa-based label The Beautiful Music.

== Skytone discography ==
- 2022 Adrift
- 2018 This is Gonna Get Real!
- 2017 JangleWaves
- 2015 Live @ the Fishfry
- 2010 Shining Over You
- 2006 Echoes In All Directions
