= They Could Have Been Bigger than the Beatles =

They Could Have Been Bigger Than the Beatles

Studio album by Television Personalities
- Released: 1982
- Genres: Psychedelic pop; punk rock; new wave
- Labels: Whaam! Records (original UK release); Dreamworld Records (1986 UK reissue); Fire Records (UK) (1990 & 2002 UK reissues); Velvel (1997 US release); 1972 Records (2011 US reissue)
- Producer: Steven Shorter

Television Personalities chronology
| Mummy Your Not Watching Me (1982) | They Could Have Been Bigger Than the Beatles (1982) | The Painted Word (1984) |

Professional ratings
Review scores
| Source | Rating |
|---|---|
| AllMusic | 4/5 stars |

They Could Have Been Bigger Than the Beatles is the third album by English punk rock/new wave band Television Personalities.

In 2011, it was included in NME's "The 100 Greatest Albums You've Never Heard" list. It was chosen by Andrew VanWyngarden of MGMT.

== Track listing ==
All tracks composed by Daniel Treacy; except where indicated

Side A

1. "Three Wishes" - (05:22)
2. "David Hockney's Diary" - (02:51)
3. "In a Perfumed Garden" - (03:49)
4. "Flowers for Abigail" - (03:36)
5. "King and Country" - (06:07)
6. "The Boy in the Paisley Shirt" - (03:50)
7. "Games for Boys" - (02:38)

Side B

1. "Painter Man" (Eddie Phillips, Kenny Pickett) - (02:44)
2. "Psychedelic Holiday" - (03:15)
3. "14th Floor" - (02:20)
4. "Sooty's Disco Party" - (02:22)
5. "Makin' Time" (Eddie Phillips, Kenny Pickett) - (02:52)
6. "When Emily Cries" - (04:18)
7. "The Glittering Prizes" - (03:13)
8. "Anxiety Block" - (03:07)
9. "Mysterious Ways" - (05:09)
