= The Painted Word (album) =

Studio album by Television Personalities
- Released: 1984
- Recorded: Hit Factory
- Genres: Post-punk, neo-psychedelia
- Labels: Illuminated (original UK release); Fire Records (UK) (1990 and 2002 UK reissues); 1972 Records (2011 US release)
- Producers: Daniel Treacy, Joe Foster

Television Personalities chronology
They Could Have Been Bigger Than the Beatles (1982)	The Painted Word (1984)	Privilege (1989)

The Painted Word is the fourth studio album by English post-punk band Television Personalities. It was released in 1984 by record label Illuminated.

== Reception ==
Professional ratings
Review scores
Source	Rating
AllMusic	3.5/5 stars
Melody Maker	3/5 stars
Sounds	4¾/5

The Painted Word has been generally well received by critics. Jack Barron of Sounds wrote "Some people think this is the best group in Britain. But that's a pointless debate to engage in when you can listen to such a well-crafted record." Ira Robbins of Trouser Press called the album "surprisingly serious and altogether excellent."

A negative review came from Cath Carroll of NME, writing "This opus even made the cat cringe."

== Musical style ==
Ira Robbins described the album's musical style thus: "Musically, the TVPs have drifted off into spare, droning psychedelia and ultra-restrained rock that's hauntingly beautiful, like the most delicate moments of The Velvet Underground."

== Track listing ==
Side A

1. "Stop and Smell the Roses"
2. "The Painted Word"
3. "A Life of Her Own"
4. "Bright Sunny Smiles"
5. "Mentioned in Despatches"
6. "A Sense of Belonging"
7. "Say You Won't Cry"

Side B

1. "Someone to Share My Life With"
2. "You'll Have to Scream Louder"
3. "Happy All the Time"
4. "The Girl Who Had Everything"
5. "Paradise Estate"
6. "Back to Vietnam"

== Personnel ==
- Daniel Treacy
- Dave Musker
- Joseph Foster
- Mark Flunder

with:

- David Walmsley, Ingrid Weiss, Martin Kerry-Daley
