= Privilege (Television Personalities album) =

Studio album by Television Personalities
- Released: February 1990
- Genre: Punk rock, new wave
- Length: 46:40
- Label: Fire
- Producer: Phil Vinall, Television Personalities

Television Personalities chronology
The Painted Word (1984)	Privilege (1990)	Closer to God (1992)

Professional ratings
Review scores
Source	Rating
AllMusic	4.5/4 stars
Chicago Tribune	2.5/4 stars
The Encyclopedia of Popular Music	3/5 stars
Spin Alternative Record Guide	7/10

Privilege is an album by English rock band Television Personalities. It was released in 1990 through Fire Records. The album was recorded as a trio, with former Swell Maps member Jowe Head and drummer Jeffrey Bloom accompanying Dan Treacy.

== Critical reception ==
Jason Ankeny of AllMusic gave the album a positive review, describing it as "one of the group's most personal and dark records." Chicago Tribune critic David Levinsky wrote that "the LP suffers from overly lush production, supplying one too many monolithic synth chords." Levinsky also stated: "We get a record suffering from the shotgun approach: a couple of exceptional singles and a lot of also-rans." In contrast, Ira Robbins of Trouser Press stated: "Privilege dresses Treacy's characteristically direct songs with just the right amount of keyboards, and his voice is as boyishly engaging as ever." The Spin Alternative Record Guide called the album "overproduced," but wrote that "Treacy can still make his pop obsessions gleam like vintage Campbell's soup cans."

== Track listing ==
All songs written by Dan Treacy, except where noted.

1. "Paradise Is For The Blessed" – 3:49
2. "A Good And Faithful Servant" – 3:38
3. "Conscience Tells Me No" – 3:29
4. "My Hedonistic Tendencies" – 4:05
5. "All My Dreams Are Dead" – 3:00
6. "Salvador Dali's Garden Party" – 3:32
7. "The Man Who Paints The Rainbows" – 2:44
8. "What If It's Raining?" – 3:37
9. "Sad Mona Lisa" – 2:40
10. "The Engine Driver Song" – 2:55
11. "Sometimes I Think You Know Me Better Than I Know Myself" – 1:51
12. "Privilege" – 3:43
13. "The Room At The Top Of The Stairs" (Randall Hylton, Treacy) – 3:35
14. "This Time There's No Happy Ending" – 2:20
15. "Part One: Fulfilling The Contractual Obligations" – 1:47

== Personnel ==
Television Personalities

- Jowe Head – bass
- Jefferey Bloom – drums
- Dan Treacy – guitar, keyboards, vocals
- Jowe Head – strings, trumpet

Technical

- Matthew Fisher – engineering
- Wilson Sharp – engineering
- Television Personalities – production
- Phil Vinall – production
