= Ed Ball (musician) =

English musician (born 1959)

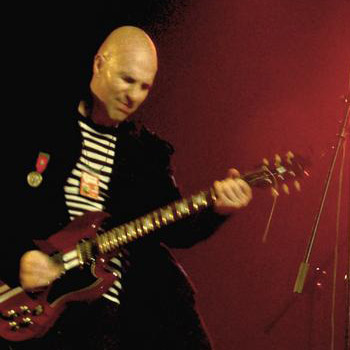
- Ed Ball in concert, 2007.

Background information
- Born: Edward Ball; 23 November 1959 (age 66)
- Origin: Chelsea, London, England
- Genres: Post-punk; indie pop; dance
- Occupations: Musician, songwriter
- Instruments: Vocals, guitar, keyboards
- Years active: 1977–present
- Label: Creation Records
- Website: Edward Ball

Edward Ball (born 23 November 1959) is an English songwriter, singer, guitarist and keyboard player from London, who has recorded both solo and as a member of the Television Personalities, 'O' Level, Teenage Filmstars, The Times, and Conspiracy of Noise. He also worked for Creation Records. He was born and brought up in Chelsea, London.

== Biography ==
=== Television Personalities ===
In 1977, singer/songwriter Ball and fellow London Oratory school-friend Dan Treacy formed the Television Personalities. Ball also formed 'O' Level with John Bennett, Gerard Bennett, and Dick Scully, releasing two singles in 1978. In 1979, he recorded as the Teenage Filmstars, along with fellow members of the Television Personalities, releasing three singles between 1979 and 1980. Ball and Treacy ('Slaughter' Joe Foster left the band prior to the recording of any material under the Television Personalities name) released And Don't the Kids Just Love It (1980) for Rough Trade Records. Following a brief parting with Rough Trade, they launched their own label Whaam! Records with Mummy Your Not Watching Me (1981), They Could Have Been Bigger Than the Beatles (1982) and And Don't the Kids Just Love It. The Whaam! record label was later renamed Dreamworld, following a legal dispute with George Michael. Ball, meanwhile, had formed a more permanent outlet for his music in 1981 with The Times, releasing the Pop Goes Art! album in 1982, and leaving the TV Personalities the same year, although he later returned in 2004, appearing on the album My Dark Places (Domino Records, 2005) and on parts of the albums And They All Lived Happily Ever After (Damaged Goods, 2004) and Are We Nearly There Yet? (Overground, 2007).

=== The Times ===
On leaving the Television Personalities, Ball concentrated on The Times, a band with an ever-changing line-up in which he remained the only constant member. Following Pop Goes Art!, from 1982 to 1986 the band released four further albums, two mini-albums and an EP on Ball's own Artpop label plus another album 'Go! With The Times' on the German label Pastell. In 1986 Ball dissolved The Times to become an executive at Creation Records; however, in 1988 he began to release new material under the Times name, starting with the album Beat Torture. Three albums were also released by Ball under the name of the Teenage Filmstars (although the other members of the original Teenage Filmstars were not involved in any way), Star (1992), Rocket Charms (1993) and Buy Our Record Support Our Sickness (1995).

In 2005, Ball reactivated his Artpop! label through Cherry Red, debuting with Here's To Old England!, a three-decade anthology of his work as The Times, Teenage Filmstars and 'O' Level. This was followed by comprehensive reissues of This Is London (2006) and I Helped Patrick McGoohan Escape (2006). The series continues late May 2007 with O' Level 1977 – 1980 compilation, A Day in the Life of Gilbert & George and The Times' first recorded album, GO! With The Times!.

=== Solo career ===
Ball's first solo release was the L'Orange Mechanik album in 1989, featuring music inspired by the poems of Edgar Allan Poe. As a side-project to The Times, Ball released dance music records as the Love Corporation in 1990. Between that year and 1997, he released four albums under this name on Creation. He also collaborated with Richard Green as Sand on the 1991 album The Dynamic Curve, and with Phil Vane of Extreme Noise Terror as Conspiracy of Noise on the 1993 album Chicks with Dicks and Splatter Flicks. In 1995 Creation Records issued a two-disc compilation of Ball's material, Welcome to the Wonderful World of Ed Ball, covering all his material other than that released with the Television Personalities. Two albums of solo material were released to coincide with it, If a Man Ever Loved a Woman (1995) and Catholic Guilt (1997), followed by Why Do I Need A Gun I'm Chelsea (1999).

For the first time on any of his projects, Ball found a promoter willing to support Catholic Guilt, which yielded two UK Top 75 chart singles, "The Mill Hill Self Hate Club" and "Love Is Blue". Following the collapse of Creation in 1999 Ball was unsigned to any other label and disappeared from public view, to concentrate on experimental film documentaries about Simon Fisher Turner and London. In 2004 Ball rejoined the Television Personalities, but left soon thereafter.

In 2026 Canadian record label The Beautiful Music released a tribute to Ball, I Helped Edward Ball Escape! Various Artists Tribute to the Times/Edward Ball as a double-CD.

== Discography ==
=== Studio albums ===
- L'Orange Mechanik (1989), Creation
- If a Man Ever Loved a Woman (1995), Creation
- Catholic Guilt (1997), Creation
- Why Do I Need a Gun I'm Chelsea (May 1999), Creation

=== Compilations ===
- Welcome to the Wonderful World of Ed Ball (March 1995), Creation
- Here's to Old England! (October 2005), Creation

=== Singles & EPs ===
- "If a Man Ever Loved a Woman" (1995), Creation
- "It's Kinda Lonely Where I Am" (1995), Creation
- "The Mill Hill Self Hate Club" (1996), Creation – UK No. 57
- "Trailblaze" (1996), Creation
- "Love Is Blue" (1997), Creation – UK No. 59
- "The Mill Hill Self Hate Club" (1997), Creation – reissue
- Split Xmas single (1996), Creation

=== As Love Corporation ===
==== Studio albums ====
- Tones (1990), Creation
- Lovers (1991), Creation
- Intelligentsia (1994), Creation
- Dance Stance (1997), Creation

==== Singles ====
- "Palatial" (1990), Creation
- "Give Me Some Love" (1991), Creation

=== With Television Personalities ===
==== Albums ====
- And Don't the Kids Just Love It (1981), Rough Trade
- Mummy Your Not Watching Me (1982), Whaam!
- They Could Have Been Bigger Than The Beatles (1982), Whaam!

==== Singles, EPs ====
- "14th Floor" (1978), W1 Teen
- Where's Bill Grundy Now? EP (1978), King's Road
- "Smashing Time" (1980), Rough Trade
- "I Know Where Syd Barrett Lives" (1981), Rough Trade
- "Three Wishes" (1982), Whaam!

=== With O-Level ===
see 'O' Level Discography

=== With Teenage Filmstars ===
see Teenage Filmstars Discography

=== With The Times ===
see The Times Discography

=== With Sand ===
- The Dynamic Curve (1991), Creation
- Vol. Two – Five Grains (1992), Creation

=== With Conspiracy of Noise ===
- Chicks with Dicks and Splatter Flicks (1993), Creation

== Sources ==
- Berton, Benjamin. Dreamworld: The fabulous life of Daniel Treacy and his band Television Personalities. Mainz: Ventil Verlag, 2022. ISBN 978-3-9557-5621-5
