= Up Against It (album) =

Studio album by the Times
- Released: 1986
- Genres: Post punk, indie
- Label: Artpop!
- Producers: Paul Kendall and The Times

The Times chronology
Go! With the Times (1985)	Up Against It (1986)	Enjoy the Times (1986)

Up Against It is the fifth album by West London post punk and indie band the Times released in 1986.

== Track listing ==
1. "Up Against It"
2. "Last Tango for One"
3. "Boys About Town"
4. "Garden in the Moonlight (Love Theme for McTurk and Rowena)"
5. "WPC Boon'"
6. "Most Modern Woman in the World"
7. "Jacks Revolution"
8. "Ladies of the Cause"
9. "Mutiny in the British Empire"
10. "Escape!"
11. "She's a Professional"
12. "It's Cabaret Time!"
13. "The War"
14. "The Wedding Song"

== Personnel ==
- John East (bass, vocals)
- Paul Damien (drums, vocals)
- Edward Ball (vocals, guitar)
