= Are We Nearly There Yet? =

Studio album by Television Personalities
- Released: 20 February 2007
- Recorded: 2005
- Genre: Post-punk, indie pop
- Length: 37:11
- Label: Overground Records
- Producer: Eric Stumpp

Television Personalities chronology
My Dark Places (2006)	Are We Nearly There Yet? (2007)	A Memory Is Better Than Nothing (2010)

Professional ratings
Review scores
Source	Rating
AllMusic	4/5 stars
Mojo	3/5 stars
Stylus Magazine	B
The Vinyl District	B+

Are We Nearly There Yet? is an album by the indie band Television Personalities. It was released in the United Kingdom on 20 February 2007. The album contains new tracks along with covers of Bruce Springsteen and The Killers. It is made up of unreleased recordings from the summer of 2005, the period just after Dan Treacy's release from prison and preceding his Domino recordings.

== Critical reception ==
CMJ New Music Monthly wrote that "it's too easy to castigate Treacy's music as 'outsider art', but on his recent outings it's clear that the man's just figuring out how to adjust to normal life." Alan McGee, in The Guardian, called the album a "dark" classic. Record Collector wrote that "a righteously shambolic cover of The Killers’ "Mr. Brightside" is a triumphant mess, and a highpoint in an album of lows."

== Track listing ==
1. "Are We Nearly There Yet?"
2. "The Peter Gabriel Song"
3. "The Eminem Song"
4. "I Get Scared When I Don't Know Where You Are"
5. "I See Dead People"
6. "If I Could Write Poetry"
7. "If I Should Fall Behind" (Bruce Springsteen)
8. "Coltrane's Ghost"
9. "Mr. Brightside"
10. "All the Midnight Cowboys"
11. "All the King's Horses"
12. "You are Loved"
13. "It's All About the Girl"
