= My Dark Places (album) =

Studio album by Television Personalities
- Released: 27 February 2006
- Recorded: Soupstudio, London
- Length: 53:15
- Label: Domino WIGCD166
- Producer: Simon Trought

Television Personalities chronology
Don't Cry Baby, It's Only a Movie (1998)	My Dark Places (2006)	Are We Nearly There Yet? (2007)

My Dark Places is a 2006 album by the English Post-punk band the Television Personalities. It was the band's first recording in 11 years, following 1998's Don't Cry Baby, It's Only a Movie.

== Reception ==
The critic Douglas Wolke described My Dark Places as "the band's saddest, most chaotic album. Much of it was improvised in the studio; at times, it recalls Mr. Barrett's edge-of-madness songs. Mr. Treacy's wobbly, desperate vocals suggest that he's on the verge of collapsing into sobs. In fact, he said, he did break down a few times during the recording, overwhelmed by making music for the first time in 11 years. "It's the way I like to work," he added. "I like to hurt when I'm working.""

In their review, Rolling Stone wrote that "this influential Brit duo put together a low-fi collage of electronic gurgles and folky patter, with [the vocalist] spluttering stream-of-consciousness poetry in his snaggletoothed cockney croon."

Professional ratings
Aggregate scores
Source	Rating
Metacritic	(72/100)
Review scores
Source	Rating
AllMusic	3.5/5 stars
Pitchfork	(6.7/10)
Rolling Stone	2.5/5 stars

== Track listing ==
All tracks composed by Daniel Treacy

1. "Special Chair" – 3:03
2. "All the Young Children on Crack" – 3:13
3. "Sick Again" – 2:15
4. "Ex-Girlfriend Club" – 4:18
5. "Dream the Sweetest Dreams" – 2:48
6. "Velvet Underground" – 3:21
7. "My Dark Places" – 3:00
8. "I'm Not Your Typical Boy" – 3:51
9. "You Kept Me Waiting Too Long" – 4:27
10. "They'll Have to Catch Us First" – 2:14
11. "She Can' Stop Traffic" – 3:43
12. "Tell Me About Your Day" – 3:00
13. "Then a Big Boy Came and Knocked It All Down" – 4:57
14. "I Hope You're Happy Now" – 2:31
15. "No More I Hate You's" – 2:47
16. "There's No Beautiful Way to Say Goodbye" – 3:47

== Personnel ==
- Daniel Treacy - vocals
- Ed Ball - guitar
- Mathew Sawyer - drums
- Victoria Yeulet - vocals

== Sources ==
- Wolk, Douglas (12 March 2006). "A Full-Time Punk Again". New York Times.
