= Television Personalities =

English post-punk band

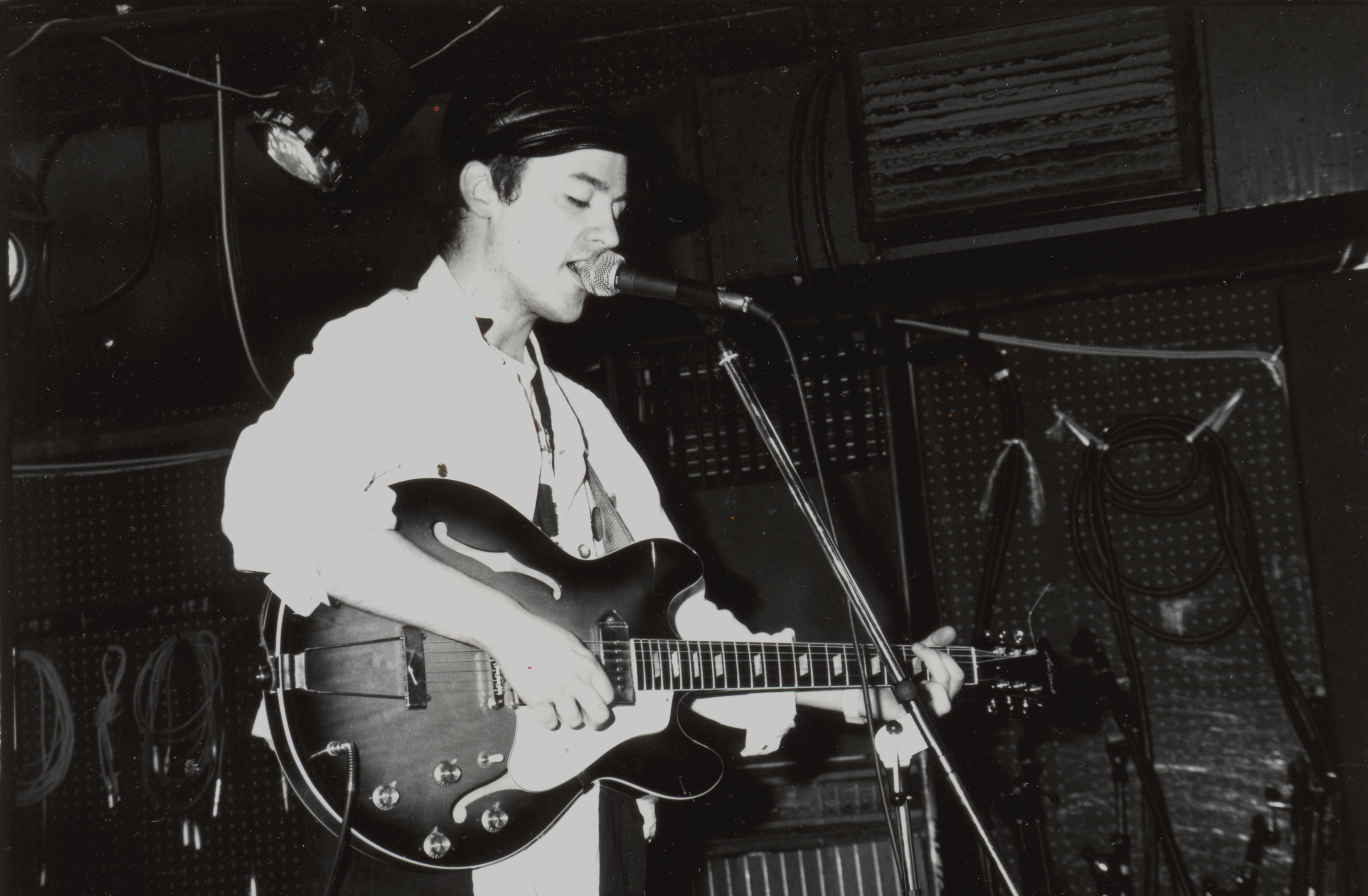
- Dan Treacy performing with Television Personalities in Japan, April 1994.

Background information
- Origin: London, England
- Genres: Post-punk; indie pop; neo-psychedelia
- Years active: 1977–1998; 2004–present
- Labels: Little Teddy Recordings; Domino Recording Company; Rocket Girl; Rough Trade; Fire Records (UK); Whaam! Records
- Members: Dan Treacy; Mike Stone; Jeff Bloom; Dave Musker; Lee McFadden
- Past members: 'Slaughter Joe' Foster; Ed Ball; Jowe Head; John Bennett; Gerard Bennett; Texas Bob Juarez; Mark 'Empire' Sheppard; Bernard Fox; Arnau Obiols; Mark Flunder; Kevin Mann; Victoria Yeulet; Mathew Sawyer; Graeme Wilson
- Website: Homepage

Television Personalities are an English post-punk band formed in 1977 in London by front man and singer-songwriter Dan Treacy. Their varied career also encompasses neo-psychedelia and indie pop; the only constant being Treacy's songwriting, with the band being best known for their early single "Part Time Punks", a favourite of John Peel. Present and former members include Chelsea childhood friends 'Slaughter Joe' Joe Foster, one-time best friend Ed Ball and Jowe Head (ex-Swell Maps), with Jeffrey Bloom from 1983 to 1994. Treacy, Head and Bloom formed the longest unchanged line-up.

Though experiencing relatively minor commercial success, the TVP's have been highly regarded by critics as pioneers of early DIY music and proven to be widely influential on the C86 and twee generation, as well as Creation Records and American artists like Pavement and MGMT. In 1984, Pink Floyd's David Gilmour invited the TVP's to open for him. Kurt Cobain later invited the band to open for Nirvana in London on 5 November 1991. Treacy's unconventional but dryly witty and British pop culture-infused lyrics, have led to his reputation as a seminal and iconic figure within the independent music scene.

== Career ==
=== Formation ===
Treacy was inspired to form the Television Personalities after hearing the Sex Pistols. He did not prepare set-lists for live performances, preferring to keep the band on their toes. The band struggled to find a name, and early suggestions included the names of mainstream and often ridiculed television hosts such as Nicholas Parsons, Russell Harty, Bruce Forsyth and Hughie Green, before they decided on the more generic "Television Personalities".

Their first single "14th Floor" was released in January 1978. It was followed by the 1978 EP Where's Bill Grundy Now? which brought them to popular attention. The EP features their lone chart hit, the seminal "Part Time Punks", written while Treacy was aged 17 and living in a high-rise building on London's King's Road. Ed Ball was amazed at the quality of Treacy's writing, and admitted that he "couldn't believe the lyrics. Suddenly, my best friend was coming out with these amazing songs." With the financial backing of his mother, Treacy hand-pressed 500 copies of "'Where's Bill Grundy Now?", each with a photocopied sleeve, which he sent to various record companies and radio DJs. The track was picked up by John Peel of the BBC who loved the EP and played it repeatedly. Despite this, Treacy had underestimated the costs of production and admitted that his "mum was hassling me to pay back the money."

The song title and resulting media attention brought the band to the notice of the music press and rock establishment royalty they were parodying. Treacy said: "Jimmy Page came in one day when I was reading an interview I'd done, and I told him I had a record out. So then, he walks me upstairs to a wardrobe brimming with guitars, hands me one and five minutes later, I was jamming with Jimmy Page. He was good, but he weren't as good as me." Later the promotion of the "14th Floor" single was supported by Joe Strummer, and they became a foundational band for Alan McGee when he began to form Creation Records.

=== Mute Records ===
In mid-1980 the Television Personalities, having recruited Joe Foster on bass and Mark Sheppard (known as Empire) on drums, made their live debut. This line-up was short-lived reportedly due to differences between Foster and Sheppard, leading to Foster's departure. Prior to this, Treacy and Sheppard helped out with Foster's solo project, the Missing Scientists, which included Mute Records head Daniel Miller.

The Television Personalities' first album ...And Don't The Kids Just Love It was released in 1981. It set the template for their subsequent career: neo-psychedelia married to an obsession with youth culture of the 1960s. Their second album Mummy Your Not Watching Me [sic] demonstrated increased psychedelic influences. Their third album, entitled They Could Have Been Bigger Than The Beatles showed Treacy's sense of humour; the TVPs never achieved significant commercial success in the UK, although their albums sold respectably in Germany, Sweden and the Netherlands. The first three albums featured Treacy and schoolmate Ed Ball; Ball left the band in 1982 to found The Times, but rejoined in 2004.

According to the critic Ira Robbins, their 1984 album The Painted Word indicated that the TVPs had "drifted off into spare, droning psychedelia and ultra-restrained rock that's hauntingly beautiful, like the most delicate moments of The Velvet Underground." The band were hired that year to support Pink Floyd guitarist David Gilmour on the tour for his solo album About Face, but were fired when they performed their song "I Know Where Syd Barrett Lives", during which Treacy read out Barrett's real address on stage.

=== Later years and revival ===
In 1983 the band comprised Treacy, Dave Musker on keyboards, Joe Foster on guitar and Mark Flunder on bass. Jeffrey Bloom joined on drums at a gig in Alan McGee's Living Room club, and shortly afterwards Stephen Bird – aka Jowe Head – replaced Flunder on bass. This line-up went on the band's first tour of Europe before Foster and Musker left. This left the band as a guitar, bass and drums threesome; Treacy, Head, and Bloom would continue as the Television Personalities for the next 14 years. The band were regulars on the London gig scene and also did several tours of the UK, Europe, the U.S. and Japan. The Chocolate Art and Camping in France live albums were recorded during this time.

Various line-up changes and circumstances prevented the recordings for Privilege from being released until 1990. Their subsequent album Closer to God was a combination of sixties style pop and darker material, and was similar in tone to The Painted Word.

Treacy later struggled with mental health issues and drug addiction, and from 1998 to June 2004 was incarcerated for theft. He spent time on the prison ship HMP Weare in Portland Harbour, Dorset, England. A gig at the Hanbury Ballroom, Brighton on 6 August 2005 ended in chaos after half an hour when Treacy had apparent difficulties with his guitars and mic stand. His bandmates left him on stage, and the gig was halted by the management. His 2006 comeback album My Dark Places received widespread critical acclaim, including for the single "Velvet Underground". The NME described the album as a "stunningly original record – harrowing and hilarious in equal amounts", while the BBC wrote that the album "captures the offbeat brilliance that made the TVPs indie legends in the 70s, characterised by Treacy’s endearingly slapdash attitude towards singing in tune and playing in time." He was reportedly seriously ill in October 2011 following surgery to remove a blood clot in his brain. He regained consciousness in December, but remained hospitalised. By 2016 he was still recovering from the surgery, but said he intended to return to music.

In January 2018, Fire Records released the long-lost Beautiful Despair as the band's twelfth album. It had been recorded in 1990 on a 4-track, between 1989's "Privilege" and 1992's "Closer to God", but remained unreleased.

In November 2018 members of Television Personalities formed with guests to play a benefit show for Dan Treacy at London's 100 Club. The current line up features all members of the band who played with Dan at various times in his career.

== Legacy ==
The Television Personalities have been widely influential, and were critically acclaimed from their beginnings. Bands that have cited them as formative influences include Half Man Half Biscuit, The Pastels, Jesus and Mary Chain, Beat Happening, Nirvana, Tindersticks (who covered the song "You’ll Have To Scream Louder" in 2020), Pavement and MGMT (who wrote the track "Song for Dan Treacy").

In 2006, music critic Cam Lindsay described Treacy as having "recorded some of the most bizarre, unlistenable and brilliant pop songs in the last three decades".

In 2018, writer Jed Smith described Treacy as "the U.K.'s answer to Jonathan Richman—but a council estate version, all too familiar with the gritty reality of working-class urban Brits".

== Discography ==
Treacy is known for the numerous popular culture references and in-jokes scattered throughout the TVPs' lyrics, album titles and release artwork. Most of the references are to (mostly British) cult films, 1960s culture and forgotten or underappreciated musicians and celebrities.

=== Albums ===
The following is a complete list of the Television Personalities' albums.

- ...And Don't the Kids Just Love It (1981, Rough Trade)
- Mummy Your Not Watching Me (1982, Whaam! Records)
- They Could Have Been Bigger than the Beatles (1982, Whaam! Records)
- The Painted Word (1984, Illuminated Records)
- Privilege (1989, Fire Records)
- Closer to God (1992, Fire Records)
- I Was a Mod Before You Was a Mod (1995, Overground Records)
- Don't Cry Baby, It's Only a Movie (1998, Damaged Goods Records)
- My Dark Places (2006, Domino)
- Are We Nearly There Yet? (2007, Overground Records)
- A Memory Is Better Than Nothing (2010, Rocket Girl)
- Beautiful Despair (2018, Fire Records)

== Sources ==
- Berton, Benjamin. Dreamworld: The fabulous life of Daniel Treacy and his band Television Personalities. Mainz: Ventil Verlag, 2022. ISBN 978-3-9557-5621-5
- Buckley, Peter. The Rough Guide to Rock. Rough Guides, 2003. ISBN 978-1-8435-3105-0
- Cavanagh, David. The Creation Records Story: My Magpie Eyes Are Hungry for the Prize. London: Virgin Books, 2000. ISBN 0-7535-0645-9
- Robb, John. Punk Rock: An Oral History. London: Ebury Press, 2006. ISBN 0-09-190511-7
- Young, Rob. Rough Trade: Labels Unlimited. London: Black Dog Publishing, 2006. ISBN 978-1-9047-7247-7
