= Fire Records (UK) =

British record label

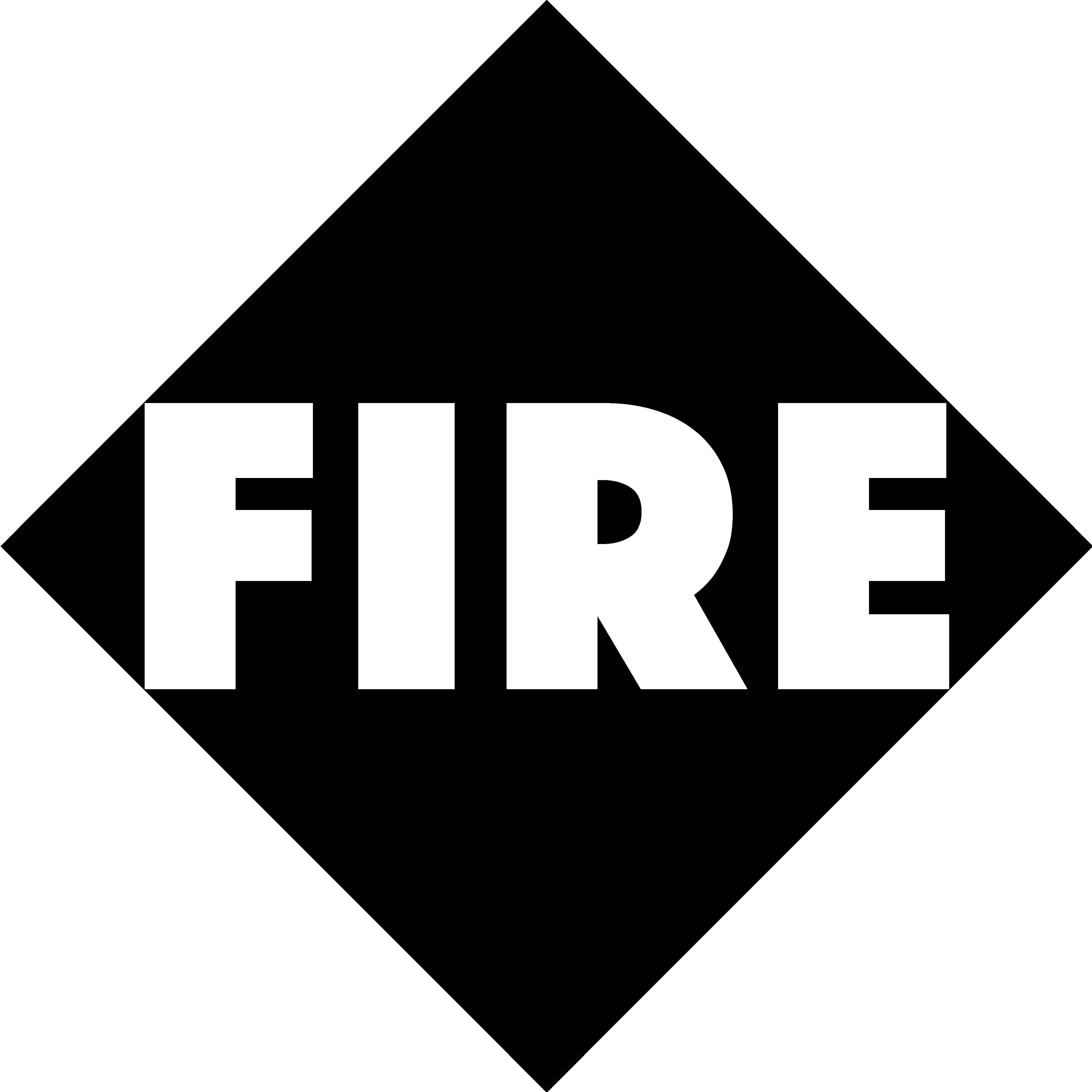
- Founded: 1985
- Founder: Johnny Waller, Clive Solomon
- Genre: Alternative rock, indie rock
- Country of origin: United Kingdom
- Location: London, England
- Official website: firerecords.com

Fire Records is a British independent record label, run by James Nicholls, with offices in London, England and New York, United States. The label was founded by music journalist Johnny Waller and Clive Solomon in 1985 and released early records from Pulp, Teenage Fanclub (on subsidiary label Paperhouse), Spacemen 3 (formerly on Glass Records), Blue Aeroplanes, Lives of Angels and others. In the early 1990s, the label was home to Neutral Milk Hotel, The Lemonheads, Built to Spill, Urge Overkill and others. The label was relaunched in the late 1990s by James Nicholls, and has gone on to release albums by Guided By Voices, Giant Sand, Pere Ubu, Black Lips, Jane Weaver, Josephine Foster, The Lemonheads and Islet.

== Roster ==
Current

- Bardo Pond
- Bark Psychosis
- The Bevis Frond
- The Chills
- Death And Vanilla
- The Groundhogs
- Josephine Foster
- Howe Gelb
- Islet
- Kristin Hersh
- Las Kellies
- Marina Allen
- Marta Del Grandi
- The Mekons
- MEMORIALS
- Modern Studies
- Noveller
- Orchestra of Spheres
- Pere Ubu
- Pictish Trail
- Rats on Rafts
- RVG
- Scott & Charlene's Wedding
- Throwing Muses
- Virginia Wing
- Jane Weaver

Former

- Archers of Loaf
- Bailter Space
- Atlantica
- The Badgeman
- Blank Realm
- Blue Aeroplanes
- Boston Spaceships
- Cardinal
- Chuck
- Dave Cloud & The Gospel of Power
- Ned Collette + Wirewalker
- Congregation
- Bobby Conn
- Cottonmouth
- Danielson
- Richard Davies
- Delicate AWOL
- Ryan Driver
- ESG
- Everclear
- The Farm
- Fitz of Depression
- The Garbage and the Flowers
- Duke Garwood
- Giant Sand
- Gigolo Aunts
- Guided By Voices
- Gun Club
- Half Japanese
- Harbourkings
- Hospitality
- HTRK
- Jackie O Motherfucker
- Libido
- Lives of Angels
- Lower Plenty
- Manifesto
- Mega City Four
- Mission of Burma
- Tom Morgan
- AC Newman
- The Nightblooms
- Novocaine
- Opossum
- The Parachute Men
- Pulp
- Robert Pollard
- Chuck Prophet
- Rocket From The Tombs
- The Rose of Avalanche
- Sammy
- Mathew Sawyer and The Ghosts
- Scraps
- The Servants
- Sign Language
- Silver Chapter
- Spacemen 3
- Supermodel
- Surf City
- Tells
- Telstar Ponies
- Tenebrous Liar
- Thrum
- The Times
- Variety Lights
- Virgin Passages
- Wooden Wand

== See also ==
- List of independent record labels
