= Benjamin Berton =

French writer

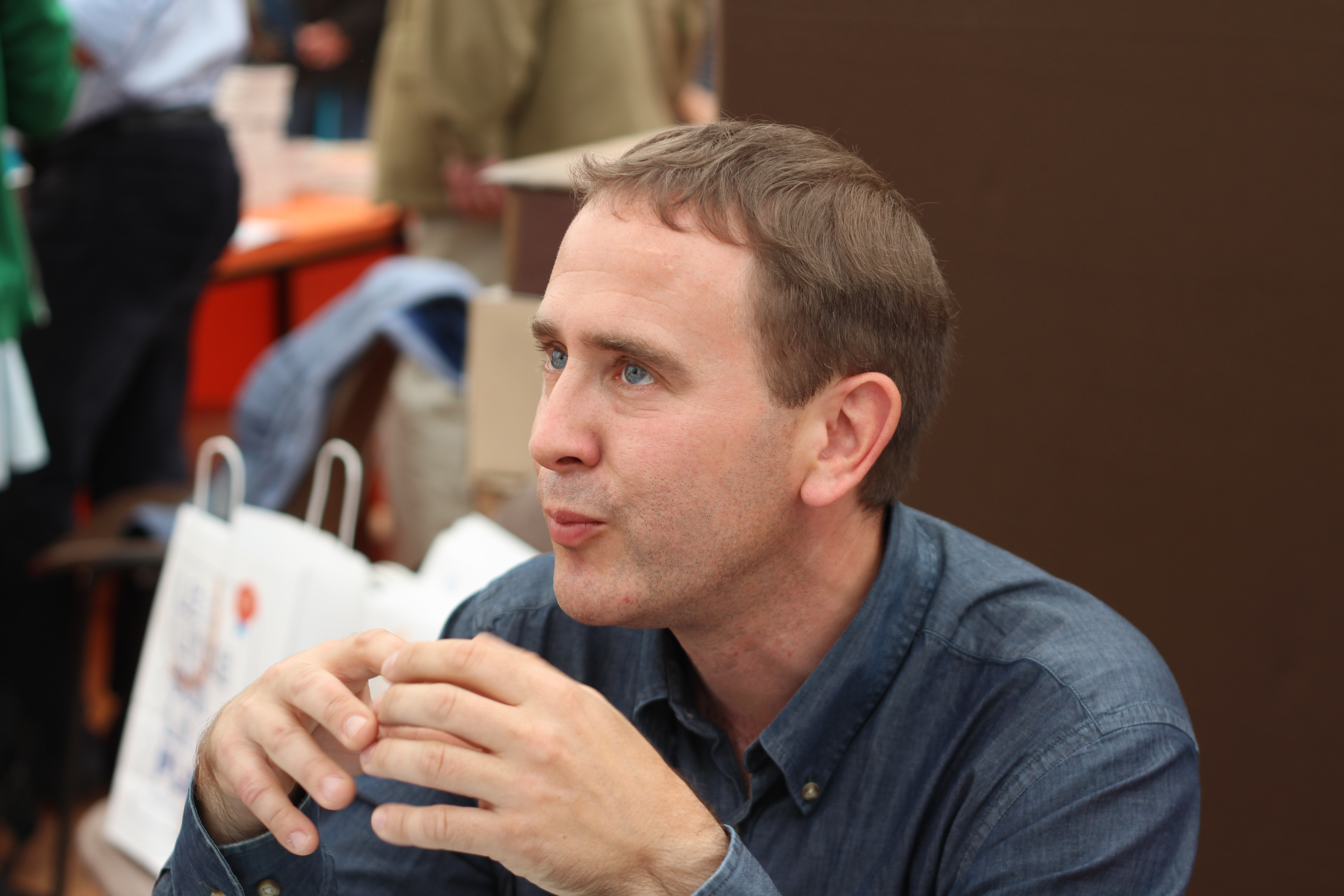
Benjamin Berton in 2014

Benjamin Berton (born 1974, Valenciennes) is a French writer, novelist, essayist and music critic.

== Biography ==
Benjamin Berton graduated from the Institut d’études politiques de Paris and received a D.E.A. in social and cultural history. Sauvageons, a chronicle of the lives of northern teenagers who lack direction, won the prix Goncourt du premier roman and the Prix littéraire de la vocation in 2000. He lives in Le Mans, where his novel La Chambre à remonter le temps is set.

In 2020, Berton published the first biography of the English group the Television Personalities. In 2021, he published his first young adult novel, Le Club des Timbré. He is also a literary and music critic for the website Fluctuat/Premiere. Since 2014, he has collaborated with the music webzine Sun Burns Out.

Berton is the organiser of the "Festival Outsiders" in Paris, dedicated to independent music.

== Works ==
- 2000: Sauvageons
- 2001: Classe Affaires
- 2004: Pirates
- 2007: Foudres de guerre
- 2009: Alain Delon est une star au Japon
- 2011: La Chambre à remonter le temps
- 2014: Le Nuage radioactif
- 2015: J'étais la terreur
- 2022: Dreamworld: The fabulous life of Daniel Treacy and his band Television Personalities
