= Jane from Occupied Europe =

Studio album by Swell Maps
- Released: 16 August 1980
- Recorded: June 1979 – May 1980 (WMRS, Leamington Spa), except "Mining Villages" July 1977 ("at home"), "Epic's Trip" & "Big Empty Field (No. 2)" March 1980 (London)
- Genres: Post-punk; art punk; experimental rock; krautrock; industrial
- Length: 44:17
- Labels: Rather; Rough Trade; Mute; Secretly Canadian
- Producer: Swell Maps

Swell Maps chronology
A Trip to Marineville (1979)	Jane from Occupied Europe (1980)

Jane from Occupied Europe is the second and final album by the English post-punk band Swell Maps. It was released in 1980 by Rather Records and Rough Trade. In 1989, the album was reissued with eight bonus tracks by Mute, and this edition was subsequently reissued in 2004 by Secretly Canadian.

== Critical reception ==
Professional ratings
Review scores
Source	Rating
AllMusic	4.5/5 stars
Pitchfork	8.2/10
Record Mirror	4.5/5 stars
The Rolling Stone Album Guide	4.5/5 stars
Spin Alternative Record Guide	7/10
Uncut	4/5 stars

In 2016, Paste ranked Jane from Occupied Europe at number 42 on its list of the best post-punk albums. In 2018, Pitchfork listed it as the 165th best album of the 1980s. Pitchfork's Judy Berman wrote: "Swell Maps pasted mostly incomprehensible, drawled vocals into noisy, krautrock-inspired sound collages, straying further beyond the boundaries of any existing genre with each release. Their second album, Jane from Occupied Europe, marked the culmination of that trajectory. It was, most of all, a catalog of thrilling new sounds".

== Track listing ==
No.	Title	Writer(s)	Length
1.	"Robot Factory"	Epic Soundtracks; Biggles	2:27
2.	"Let's Buy a Bridge"	Nikki Sudden	1:55
3.	"Border Country"	Nikki Sudden	2:12
4.	"Cake Shop"	Jowe Head	2:25
5.	"The Helicopter Spies"	Nikki Sudden	4:20
6.	"Big Maz in "The Desert from the Trolley""	Swell Maps	5:11
7.	"Big Empty Field"	Epic Soundtracks; Biggles	3:44
8.	"Mining Villages"	Epic Soundtracks; Phones	1:01
9.	"Collision with a Frogman vs. The Mangrove Delta Plan"	Swell Maps	8:06
10.	"Secret Island"	Nikki Sudden	4:34
11.	"Whatever Happens Next...."	Nikki Sudden	2:58
12.	"Blenheim Shots"	Nikki Sudden	3:42
13.	"A Raincoat's Room"	Epic Soundtracks	1:42
Total length:			44:17

Reissue bonus tracks
No.	Title	Writer(s)	Length
14.	"Let's Build a Car"	Nikki Sudden	3:06
15.	"Epic's Trip"	Epic Soundtracks	0:55
16.	"Secret Island"	Nikki Sudden	6:27
17.	"Amphitheatres"	Swell Maps	2:56
18.	"Big Empty Field (No. 2)"	Epic Soundtracks; Biggles	2:59
19.	"The Stairs are Like an Avalanche"	Swell Maps	4:04
20.	"...then Poland"	Swell Maps	0:52
21.	"New York"	Nikki Sudden	3:19

== Personnel ==
Swell Maps

- Nikki Sudden (Adrian Godfrey) – guitar (1–5, 9–12), toys (1, 6), vocals (2, 3, 5, 10–12), Hammond organ (4, 12), handclaps (5, 9), bass (6), eiderdown (6), mumbling (6), piano (11), cover artwork
- Epic Soundtracks (Kevin Godfrey) – drums (1–7, 9–12), Hammond organ (1, 10), toys (1, 6, 7), backing vocals (2, 5, 10, 11), piano (3, 6, 9, 13), handclaps (5, 9), violin (6), mumbling (6, 13), guitar (7), saxophone (7), concrete (8), typewriter (8)
- Richard "Biggles" Earl – Hammond organ (1), toys (1, 6), guitar (2, 4–7, 9–12), backing vocals (2, 10), electric guitar (3), acoustic guitar (3), handclaps (5, 9), vocals (5, 11), mumbling (6), bass (7), cover artwork
- Jowe Head (Stephen Bird) – guitar (1, 4, 7), toys (1), bass (2–5, 9–11), saxophone (2,7), backing vocals (2, 3, 10, 11), vocals (4), pianoforte (6)
- David "Phones" Barrington – guitar (5), twelve string guitar (6), violin (6), kazoo (8), vocals (8), handclaps (9), backing vocals (10)
- John "Golden" Cockrill – handclaps (5), backing vocals (5), bass (12)

Guest musicians

- Barry – organ (2)
- John "Baz" Rivers – Hammond organ

Production

- Swell Maps – producer, arranger, photography
- John Rivers – engineer
- Lucy Cameron – photography
