= Suzie Stapleton =

Australian singer-songwriter and guitarist

- Genres: Alternative rock; gothic blues; dark folk
- Label: Negative Prophet / Cargo
- Members: Suzie Stapleton; Gavin Jay; Jim Macaulay; Dave Collingwood; Gareth Skinner
- Past members: Ian White; Craig Williamson; Leif van den Dungen; Helen Buckley; Thomy Sloane; Rui Pereira; Shane Walsh
- Website: www.suziestapleton.com

Suzie Stapleton is an Australian singer-songwriter and guitarist who lives in Brighton, UK. She has released two EPs and an album, We Are the Plague, that combine alternative rock with gothic blues and dark folk.

In 2023 Stapleton appeared on The Jeffrey Lee Pierce Sessions Project album ‘The Task Has Overwhelmed us’ recording a version of ‘Secret Fires’ with UK blues instrumentalist Duke Garwood, and producing and performing on ‘Mother of Earth’ which features Dave Gahan on lead vocals and guitar. Stapleton approached Gahan to record the track after he'd purchased her album 'We Are The Plague' from her website. Following this collaboration Stapleton was invited to open for Depeche Mode on European arena dates as part of their Memento Mori World Tour in March 2024.

Stapleton has also performed on recordings with Lydia Lunch, Mark Lanegan, Cypress Grove and Crippled Black Phoenix.

== Background ==
Stapleton was born and raised in Sydney, Australia. After dropping out of high school she studied audio engineering, became a club DJ, and worked as a radio host and voice-over artist. She also acted in various Australian television drama series and ABC Television productions

In 2005 Stapleton moved to Melbourne and it was here that she began performing as a solo artist in 2007. This evolved into a full band line-up, with whom she recorded two critically acclaimed EPs. Relocating to the UK in 2015, Stapleton was initially based in London, where she recruited a new band featuring Gavin Jay on bass and Ian White on drums. During this time Stapleton also toured across the UK and Europe solo and supported artists such as Mark Lanegan, Mick Harvey and Jim Jones and the Righteous Mind.

Reviewing her support slot for Mick Harvey in Glasgow, Louder Than War wrote: "It's rare that a new artist comes along who genuinely defies easy description, but this is certainly the case with Stapleton. Her songs seem to inhabit the dark, intense corners of the soul in a manner not dissimilar to Nick Drake or even Elliott Smith, yet Stapleton's guitar-playing is at once raw and tender, at times evoking the elemental spirit of Link Wray or Sister-era Sonic Youth... a bright new star in the ascendant."

In 2019 Stapleton settled in Brighton, after spending time there writing her debut album and with a family connection to the area, her grandmother having been born in the Lanes in the 1920s.

== Releases ==
45 Revelations Per Minute - EP (2009)

Stapleton recorded her first EP "45 Revelations Per Minute" in Melbourne, Australia. Charlie Owen (The Divinyls, Beasts Of Bourbon) plays slide guitar on "Cut Away" and rhodes piano on ‘Asking', Johnny Nolan (The Powder Monkeys, Bored) plays lead guitar on "6ft Away", and bassist Shane Walsh (Tex, Don & Charlie) and drummer Ian Kitney (Temperance Union) play across the EP.

Obladi Diablo - EP (2012)

Stapleton's second EP was released in 2012, with a vinyl release in 2013 on French label Beast Records. The title roughly translates as ‘pop music is evil’ and was described as "an antidote to the insidious disease that is flaccid pop" and having "a Dirty Three and Nick Cave-like gritty Aussie folk quality to it".

The EP was produced by Stapleton and recorded and mixed by engineer Jez Giddings at Melbourne's Hothouse Studios with drummer Craig Williamson and bassist Leif van den Dungen.

The second track on the EP ‘Song Of The Artesian Water’ is an adaptation of a poem by Australian bush poet Banjo Paterson.

We Are The Plague - LP (2020)

Stapleton's debut full-length album was released on July 31, 2020, via Negative Prophet Records, in conjunction with Cargo Records.

Album sessions began in January 2019 in Oxfordshire, England at OX4 Sound with Gavin Jay (Jim Jones Revue / Jim Jones and The Righteous Mind), and Jim Macaulay (The Stranglers) recording bass and drums. Stapleton later added vocals and guitar at her home studio, with Gareth Skinner recording cello parts remotely in Melbourne, Australia. Stapleton produced the album and it was mixed by Dan Cox at Urchin Studios in London.

Themes of the album deal with environmental degradation, climate change, and societal collapse. Stapleton asks "Why have we been so quick to take drastic action on coronavirus yet drag our feet when it comes to dealing with climate change which could bring down not only us but the entire global ecosystem? Will we go back to destroying our planet, poisoning our resources, and hammering the nails in our collective coffin? Or is this the wake-up call we need to re-calibrate and work together for a better future?"

The album was critically acclaimed, appearing on several Albums of The Year lists including landing #16 on Louder Than War's Top 20 alongside Nadine Shah, Porridge Radio, and Fontaines DC. The album scored 9 out of 10 from Vive Le Rock Magazine who called it "exquisitely executed… will stack up plaudits by the dozen". Classic Rock praised its "beguiling gothic blues landscapes" whilst MOJO approved of the "fiery rock poetry, nerve-shredding blues and dark magnetism".

Reviewing the album, Louder Than War lauded a "dazzling debut" that blends "the spirit of Patti Smith and PJ Harvey with the soul of Nick Cave and Mark Lanegan". They also noted Stapleton's guitar playing, describing it as "a blizzard of distortion, notes bending and sustaining and disintegrating, somewhere between the harmonics of Duke Garwood and the brutal fuzz of Thurston Moore"

== Other projects ==
In 2013, Cypress Grove saw Stapleton perform at London's 12 Bar Club and invited her to participate in volume 3 of The Jeffrey Lee Pierce Sessions Project, titled Axels & Sockets (2014). The project celebrates the life and music of Jeffrey Lee Pierce, the late front man of the Gun Club and includes contributions from artists such as Nick Cave, Iggy Pop, Debbie Harry, Primal Scream and Thurston Moore. Stapleton provides additional vocals to the track "Constant Limbo (Constant Rain)" featuring Mark Lanegan, Bertrand Cantat, Cypress Grove and Crippled Black Phoenix, and "When I Get My Cadillac" which is performed by Cypress Grove. This led to further involvement in Volume 4 of The JLP Project The Task Has Overwhelmed Us (released 2023) with Cypress Grove eventually naming Stapleton Associate Producer of the project. Her contributions include producing and performing on ‘Mother of Earth’ alongside Dave Gahan on lead vocals and guitar. Stapleton approached Gahan to take part in the project after he’d purchased a copy of her solo record. Gahan recorded his vocals in New York whilst Stapleton orchestrated the rest of the band in London which included James Johnston (PJ Harvey, Gallon Drunk) on violin, Gavin Jay (Jim Jones Revue) on bass, Ian White (Gallon Drunk) on drums, and Stapleton herself on piano and BVs.

Stapleton also arranged two tracks that would become On The Other Side performed by Nick Cave & Debbie Harry, and I Was Ashamed performed by Pam Hogg, Youth, and Warren Ellis. Both came from live recordings of Gun Club songs (The Great Divide and Emily’s Changed respectively) that were discovered with alternate lyrics being performed. Grove asked Stapleton to take the alternate lyrics and create something new from them which were then recorded by the other performers. Stapleton also recorded her own interpretation of ‘Secret Fires’ alongside Duke Garwood, and appears on backing vocals on Alejandro Escovedo’s Death To Texas.

Stapleton performs backing vocals on two albums by Lydia Lunch & Cypress Grove, a split release with Spiritual Front called Twin Horses in 2015 and Under the Covers which was released in 2017. On this album Lunch & Grove cover songs by artists not usually associated with the no-wave icon. Stapleton performs backing vocals on their covers of Tom Petty, Allman Brothers, Hank Williams Jr, and Low.

Stapleton collaborated further with Crippled Black Phoenix in 2020 contributing guest vocals and guitar on their album Ellengæst which was released on Season of Mist.

== Discography ==
=== Albums ===
- We Are the Plague (2020, Negative Prophet Records / Cargo Records)

=== Singles and EPs ===
- 45 Revelations Per Minute, EP (2009, Independent)
- Obladi Diablo, EP (2012, Independent / 2013 Vinyl Release, Beast Records)
- "You Were There", digital single (2017, Independent)
- "Yesterday's Town", digital single (2017, Independent)
- "Negative Prophet", digital single (2018, Independent)

=== Guest appearances ===
- The Task Has Overwhelmed Us – The Jeffrey Lee Pierce Sessions Project (2024, Glitterhouse Records)
- Axels & Sockets – The Jeffrey Lee Pierce Sessions Project (2014, Glitterhouse Records)
- Twin Horses – Lydia Lunch & Cypress Grove / Spiritual Front (2015, Rustblade Records)
- Under the Covers – Lydia Lunch & Cypress Grove (2017, Rustblade Records)
- Ellengæst – Crippled Black Phoenix (2020, Season of Mist)
