= A Trip to Marineville =

Studio album by Swell Maps
- Released: 27 June 1979
- Recorded: July 1977 – 17 April 1979
- Studio: Woodbine Mobile Recording Studio (Royal Leamington Spa, Warwickshire); Spaceward Studios (Cambridge); Phones B. Sportsman's bedroom (Olton)
- Genre: Post-punk; art punk
- Length: 54:33
- Label: Rather; Rough Trade
- Producer: Swell Maps

Swell Maps chronology
A Trip to Marineville (1979)	Jane from Occupied Europe (1980)

A Trip to Marineville is the debut studio album by English art punk band Swell Maps. It was released in June 1979, through record labels Rather and Rough Trade.

== Background ==
All tracks except "Vertical Slum", "My Lil' Shoppes 'Round the Corner" and "Steven Does" were recorded in Woodbine Mobile Recording Studio in Royal Leamington Spa, Warwickshire, England on 28–29 December 1978, 15 and 17 February 1979 and 15–17 April 1979. "Vertical Slum" was recorded at Spaceward Studios, Cambridge, England on 14 September 1977. "My Lil' Shoppes 'Round the Corner" and "Steven Does" were recorded in Phones B. Sportsman's bedroom in Olton in July 1977.

== Critical reception ==
Professional ratings
Review scores
Source	Rating
AllMusic	4/5 stars
Pitchfork	8.3/10
The Rolling Stone Album Guide	4/5 stars
Smash Hits	9½/10
Spin Alternative Record Guide	8/10
Uncut	4/5 stars

Reviews of A Trip to Marineville were generally positive. NME ranked A Trip to Marineville at number 36 on its end-of-year-list of the best albums of 1979.

A Trip to Marineville is on The Guardian's list "1000 Albums to Hear Before You Die".

== Track listing ==
Side A
No.	Title	Writer(s)	Length
1.	"H. S. Art"	Nikki Sudden	2:21
2.	"Another Song"	Sudden	1:43
3.	"Vertical Slum"	Jowe Head; Sudden	1:12
4.	"Spitfire Parade"	Sudden	3:10
5.	"Harmony in Your Bathroom"	Head	5:24
6.	"Don't Throw Ashtrays at Me!"	Epic Soundtracks	1:16
7.	"Midget Submarines"	Sudden	4:33
8.	"Bridge Head, Pt. 9"	Books; Head; Soundtracks; Sudden	1:58

Side B
No.	Title	Writer(s)	Length
1.	"Full Moon in My Pocket"	Head; Soundtracks	1:30
2.	"Blam!!"	Sudden	3:31
3.	"Full Moon (Reprise)"	Head; Soundtracks	1:21
4.	"Gunboats"	Sudden	8:25
5.	"Adventuring into Basketry"	Books; Head; Soundtracks; Sudden	7:28
6.	"My Lil' Shoppes 'Round the Corner"	Unknown	0:44

Side C
No.	Title	Writer(s)	Length
1.	"Loin of the Surf"	Head	2:14
2.	"Doctor at Cake"		2:05

Side D
No.	Title	Writer(s)	Length
1.	"Steven Does"		1:45
2.	"Bronze & Baby Shoes"	Head	3:45

== Personnel ==
=== Swell Maps ===
- Epic Soundtracks (Kevin Godfrey) – drums (tracks A1–5, A7, A8, B1–5, C1 and D2), piano (tracks A1, A5, A8 and B3), backing vocals (tracks A1, A2, A7 and D2), handclaps (tracks A1, A2, A7), "voice" (tracks A6, B4), synth bass (track A7), alarm bell (track A7), xylophone (track A8), organ (track B4), "balloons" (track B4), "microphone damage" (track B5), violin (track D2), chanting (track A3), "aquatics" (track A5), toy saxophone (track A6), production, album cover design
- Jowe Head (Stephen Bird) – bass guitar (tracks A1, A2, A4, A5, B1–5 and D2), backing vocals (tracks A1, A2, A4, A7 and B2), guitar (tracks A1, A3, C1 and D2), vocals (tracks A5, B1 and D2), harmonica (tracks A1 and A6), "voice" (tracks A6 and A8), handclaps (tracks A1 and A2), chanting (tracks A3), cymbal (track A6), vacuum cleaner (track A7), toy saxophone (track A8), "balloons" (track B4), slide guitar (track B4), production, EP cover design
- Nikki Sudden (Adrian Godfrey) – guitar (tracks A1, A2, A4, A5, A7, A8, B1–5 and D2), vocals (tracks A1–4, A7 and B4), handclaps (tracks A1, A2), chanting (track A3), "omnipresence" (track A6), "voice" (track B2), "balloons" (track B4), piano (track D2), toy saxophone (track D2), backing vocals (track D2), production, sleeve design
- Biggles Books (Richard Earl) – guitar (tracks A1, A2, A4, A5, A7, B1–5 and D2), backing vocals (tracks A1, A2, A4), handclaps (tracks A1 and A2), xylophone (tracks A6 and A8), chanting (track A3), "aquatics" (track A5), "voice" (track A6), vacuum cleaner (track A8), screams (track A8), "balloons" (track B4), organ (track B4), slide guitar (track B4), production

=== Additional personnel ===
- Phones B. Sportsman (David Barrington) – guitar (tracks B6 and C1), bass guitar (track A3), chanting (track A3), backing vocals (tracks A5 and B2), "voice" (track B5), cymbal (track B5), vocals (track B6)
- Golden Cockrill (John Cockrill) – backing vocals (tracks A5 and B2), guitar (track A3), chanting (track A3), bass guitar (track C1)

=== Technical ===
- John Rivers – engineering
- Mike Kemp – engineering ("Vertical Slum")
