= Palooka =

Palooka may refer to:

- Joe Palooka, an American comic strip
- Palooka (film), a 1934 film based on the comic strip
- The Palooka, a one-act play by Tennessee Williams
- Palookas, a 1980s rock group fronted by Jowe Head
- Palooka, an unskilful player in bridge and other card games

== See also ==
- Palookaville (disambiguation)
