= Rise Above =

Rise Above may refer to:

== Albums ==
- Rise Above (Dirty Projectors album) or the title song, 2007
- Rise Above (Epic Soundtracks album), 1992
- Rise Above (JK Flesh album) or the title song, 2016
- Rise Above (Oysterband album) or the title song, 2002
- Rise Above: 24 Black Flag Songs to Benefit the West Memphis Three, by the Rollins Band, 2002

== Songs ==
- "Rise Above 1", by Reeve Carney, with Bono and the Edge, from the rock musical Spider-Man: Turn Off the Dark, 2011
- "Rise Above", by 28 Days from 28 Days, 1998
- "Rise Above", by Afro Celt Sound System from Pod, 2004
- "Rise Above", by Black Flag from Damaged, 1981

== Other uses ==
- Rise Above: The Tribe 8 Documentary, a 2004 film by Tracy Flannigan
- Rise Above Movement, an American nationalist organisation
- Rise Above Records, an English record label
- Rise Above, a ship operated by Mission Lifeline to rescue people at sea in the Mediterranean

== See also ==
- Rise Against, an American punk rock band
