= Rise Above (Epic Soundtracks album) =

Studio album by Epic Soundtracks
- Released: September 1992
- Recorded: 1992 (Wake the Dead Studio, London); except "Fallen Down" May 1991 (Fun City Studio, New York),
- Genre: Singer-songwriter, chamber pop, indie folk
- Length: 45:09
- Label: Rough Trade, Bar/None
- Producer: Epic Soundtracks, Victor Van Vugt

Epic Soundtracks chronology
Popular Classical (1981)	Rise Above (1992)	Sleeping Star (1994)

Professional ratings
Review scores
Source	Rating
AllMusic	4.5/5 stars
The Encyclopedia of Popular Music	3/5 stars
MusicHound Rock: The Essential Album Guide	2.5/5 stars

Rise Above is the 1992 solo full-length debut album by singer-songwriter Epic Soundtracks (stage name of Kevin Paul Godfrey). He had previously been known as the drummer/pianist with the bands Swell Maps, Jacobites, Crime & the City Solution and These Immortal Souls. It was released by American label Bar/None Records in 1993.

With its emphasis on a melodic singer-songwriter approach, the album was a departure from the post punk and gothic rock sounds of the groups he had earlier recorded with. Other musicians appearing on the album include Lee Ranaldo and Kim Gordon (Sonic Youth), J Mascis (Dinosaur Jr.), Martyn Casey (The Bad Seeds), Anthony Thistlethwaite (The Waterboys), Will Pepper (Thee Hypnotics) and Rowland S. Howard (The Birthday Party).

The album followed a decade of insecurity regarding his own singing (his earlier release Popular Classical featured Robert Wyatt on vocals) and passionate record collecting. The latter is evident in typeface and colours on the cover of the album, as well as the lyrics to "Sad Song", alluding to The Beach Boys' album Pet Sounds and its song "Caroline, No", respectively.

The album was remastered and re-released by Troubadour (Easy Action) on CD, with new and extensive sleeve notes and with a bonus CD including work in progress and early versions of the album's songs. Spanish label Mapache also issued the album on vinyl.

== Critical reception ==
Trouser Press wrote that "it's on the more melancholy tracks ... that clever turns of phrase give way to heartfelt intimacy: 'She Sleeps Alone/Love Fucks You Up' paints a hazy, poignant pastel of a fast-lane denizen's off-hour misery." The Spin Alternative Record Guide called it a "nicely mannered" album of "low-key piano-lounge tunes."

== Track listing ==
All tracks composed and arranged by Epic Soundtracks

1. "Fallen Down"
2. "Farmer's Daughter"
3. "Ruthless"
4. "Everybody Else is Wrong"
5. "I Feel Good"
6. "Big Apple Graveyard"
7. "I Don't Know"
8. "Meet Me on the Beach"
9. "Sad Song"
10. "She Sleeps Alone / Love Fucks You Up"
11. "Wild Situation"
12. "She Sleeps Alone"

== Personnel ==
- Epic Soundtracks – vocals, piano, bass, drums, organ, guitar
- Martyn P. Casey – bass
- Lee Ranaldo – guitar on "Fallen Down"
- J Mascis – drums on "Farmer's Daughter", "Big Apple Graveyard", "She Sleeps Alone"
- Anthony Thistlethwaite – saxophone on "Farmer's Daughter", "Everybody Else is Wrong", "I Don't Know"
- Kim Gordon – vocals on "Big Apple Graveyard"
- Will Pepper – bass on "Meet Me on the Beach"
- Rowland S. Howard – guitar on "Meet Me on the Beach", "Wild Situation"; slide guitar on "Sad Song"
- Judy Anderson – cello on "Big Apple Graveyard", "Sad Song", "She Sleeps Alone"
- Chris Lee – trumpet on "Big Apple Graveyard", "She Sleeps Alone"
- Liz Corcoran – violin on "Big Apple Graveyard", "Sad Song", "She Sleeps Alone"
- Natasha McCluney – vocals on "She Sleeps Alone"
- Henry Olsen – string arrangements
- Bleddyn Butcher – photography
