= Sleeping Star =

Studio album by Epic Soundtracks
- Released: 1994
- Recorded: May 1993 and January 1994
- Studios: Chiswick Reach, London; Wake the Dead
- Label: Bar/None
- Producer: Epic Soundtracks

Epic Soundtracks chronology
Rise Above (1992)	Sleeping Star (1994)	Debris (1995)

Sleeping Star is the second album by the English musician Epic Soundtracks, released in 1994.

Soundtracks supported the album by touring with Evan Dando.

== Production ==
Sleeping Star was produced by Soundtracks, who had long wanted to move from the noisy rock of his previous bands to a more classical pop sound. Luke Haines contributed to the album, as did Kim Gordon, J Mascis, Will Pepper, and Henry Olsen.

== Critical reception ==
Professional ratings
Review scores
Source	Rating
AllMusic	4/5 stars
Calgary Herald	A−
The Encyclopedia of Popular Music	3/5 stars
Entertainment Weekly	B+
MusicHound Rock: The Essential Album Guide	3/5 stars

Trouser Press wrote that the album "often approximates the warm, jamming feel of a vintage Band record—an impressive feat when you consider how much of the project is essentially solo." Entertainment Weekly thought that Soundtracks "continues to stake out a territory where Brian Wilson, Laura Nyro, Brill Building pop, and Hunky Dory-era David Bowie converge." The Calgary Herald deemed the album "an unassuming gem," writing that "Soundtracks' songs wear hope, sadness and longing in many colors."

The Washington Post determined that "Waiting for the Train" "gets awkwardly overwrought, but the album's most effective tunes employ a slow-burn style that rewards repeated listenings." Stereo Review advised: "Think a less sodden Alex Chilton, or a post-modern version of Bread, and you've got it." The Boston Globe praised the "gorgeous pop feel and emotional tug" of the songs.

AllMusic wrote that "'Emily May' has a rolling piano line and up-tempo rhythm that makes it the highlight of the disc."

== Track listing ==
All tracks are written by Epic Soundtracks.

No.	Title	Length
1.	"Something New Under the Sun"
2.	"There's Been a Change"
3.	"Don't Go to School"
4.	"Tonight's the Night (Rock'n'Roll Lullabye)"
5.	"Waiting for the Train"
6.	"Emily May (You Make Me Feel So Fine)"
7.	"Baby I Love You"
8.	"Hear the Whistle Blow"
9.	"There's a Rumour"
10.	"Tired Eyes"
11.	"I'll Sing a Hymn"
12.	"I Believe"

== Personnel ==
- Epic Soundtracks – acoustic and electric guitar, bass, drums, piano, organ, lead and backing vocals
- Will Pepper – bass; guitar on "Emily Man (You Make Me Feel So Fine)"
- Harry Georgeson – middle 8 guitar solo on "Something New Under the Sun", guitar on "I Believe"
- Anthony Thistlethwaite – saxophone on "There's Been a Change" and "Waiting for the Train"
- Julia Palmer – cello on "Hear the Whistle Blow" and "I'll Sing a Hymn"
- Anne Ahem – violin on "Hear The Whistle Blow" and "I'll Sing a Hymn"
- Asyam Kael – backing vocals
- Claudio Pinto – hand claps on "Emily Man (You Make Me Feel So Fine)"
- Henry Olsen – string arrangements
