= Super Natural (album) =

Studio album by Jim Jones and the Righteous Mind
- Released: 12 May 2017
- Length: 46:58
- Label: MaSonic

Jim Jones and the Righteous Mind chronology
Super Natural (2017)	CollectiV (2019)

Professional ratings
Aggregate scores
Source	Rating
Metacritic	84/100
Review scores
Source	Rating
Blurt	4/5 stars

Super Natural is the debut studio album by English band Jim Jones and the Righteous Mind. It was released on 12 May 2017 through MaSonic Records.

== Accolades ==
Publication	Accolade	Rank	Ref.
Classic Rock	Top 50 Albums of 2017	14	
Gigwise	Top 51 Albums of 2017	43	

== Track listing ==
No.	Title	Length
1.	"Dream"	4:33
2.	"Base Is Loaded"	6:16
3.	"Something's Gonna Get Its Hands on You"	4:53
4.	"No Fool"	4:04
5.	"Aldecide"	3:56
6.	"Boil Your Blood"	3:23
7.	"Shallow Grave"	5:08
8.	"Heavy Lounge, Pt. 1"	4:19
9.	"Till It's All Gone"	4:47
10.	"Everyone but Me"	5:39
