= Jim Jones and the Righteous Mind =

- Origin: London, England
- Genres: Rock n roll, psychedelic rock, garage punk, garage rock, blues, soul, country
- Labels: Ma§onic / Cargo Records; Hound Gawd! Records; Raygun Records
- Members: Jim Jones; Gavin Jay; Matt Millership; Mal Troon; Aidan Sinclair
- Past members: Henri Herbert; Joe Glossop; Phil Martini; David Page; Andy Marvell
- Website: www.righteousmind.co.uk

Jim Jones and the Righteous Mind are a British rock band formed in November 2014 by Jim Jones and Gavin Jay following the break-up of the Jim Jones Revue. The current line up includes pianist Matt Millership and multi-instrumentalist Mal Troon.

== History ==
Taking their name from a book on social psychology, Jim Jones and the Righteous Mind came together after the Jim Jones Revue disbanded in 2014. The band was initially composed of Jim Jones, Henri Herbert and Gavin Jay with Phil Martini on drums. Herbert left to concentrate on his solo career, with Joe Glossop stepping in on keyboards. David Page joined on guitar / pedal steel and this line-up recorded the Boil Yer Blood EP and Aldecide for Raygun records. Due to touring commitments Glossop and Page were later replaced by Matt Millership and Mal Troon.

On 26 May 2017 the group released their debut album via their own imprint label Ma§onic on Hound Gawd! Records. The critically acclaimed Super Natural was produced by Jim Jones and recorded in London at Space Eko East studio with Alex McGowan. French tattoo artist Jean-luc Navette designed the cover artwork for the album.

To support the release the band performed a live session for Marc Riley on BBC 6 and a live televised set in Paris for Album De La Semaine on Canal+.

In 2018 the band announced a kickstarter campaign to fund their second album CollectiV, which was again produced by Jim Jones and recorded at Space Eko East. Recording commenced in July of that year and featured guest appearances from Little Barrie Cadogan, Stuart Dace, Paul-Ronney Angel, Sister Cookie, Ray 'Sonic' Hanson, Alan Clayton, Vesna Petresin, Alex McGowan, Frank Dymore, Lucifire and Julian Marszalek. Andy Marvell played drums on the album and subsequent tours in the UK and Europe. Cover artwork was provided by Gavin Jay. Notably, a 1964 Gibson Hummingbird guitar belonging to Keith Richards was also used in the recording sessions.

CollectiV was released on Ma§onic via Cargo Records on 8 March 2019 to positive reviews, Drowned In Sound declaring the record "a masterclass in supremely executed rock and roll."'

== Musical style ==
Expanding on the 1950s rock 'n' roll influences of the Jim Jones Revue, the Righteous Mind has a darker, more cinematic sound incorporating psychedelia, country, blues and gospel, garnering favourable comparisons to Nick Cave and the Bad Seeds, Tom Waits and the Stooges.

Comparing the two bands, The Quietus wrote that "while the Jim Jones Revue swan-dived into rock & roll’s primordial ooze with an unrestrained sense of glee and abandon, Jim Jones And The Righteous Mind is an exercise in intensity, dynamics and space that, while summoning up the feral excitement of the former outfit, delivers a satisfying and continuingly intriguing payload from a great height. This is less a case of being steamrollered and more of exploration, experimentation and execution." Record Collector also noted that "the Revue's sleaze-billy holler isn’t abandoned so much as thickened on the riff’n’roll turmoil of his Righteous Mind debut" declaring the record "ridiculously thrilling".' Vive Le Rock magazine awarded the album a 10/10 rating, writing "There really aren't enough superlatives to describe just how good 'Super Natural' is - you'll be hard pushed to find anything near as perfect anywhere else all year".

The musical guests on CollectiV helped broaden the sonic palette, adding tenor and baritone saxophone, bouzouki and Fender Bass VI to the mix of pedal steel, guitar, double bass, organ, piano and drums. Louder Than War praised the "many moments of spectral, landscaped, beauty" alongside the "patented high octane rushes", judging it an "album of Rock 'n' roll from foot to the pedal raw rushes to dark introspective ballads distilled to perfection" whilst Tinnitist noted "they are still ready, willing and able to crash, bash and thrash an old-school groove-rocker at the drop of a gold medallion. But they’re also unafraid to ease up on the throttle and venture into the subterranean realms of psyche-rock, twisted roots, hoodoo-voodoo and narcotized lounge balladry."

== Discography ==
=== Singles ===
- "Boil Yer Blood EP" (2015), Raygun
- "Aldecide" (2016), Raygun
- "Till Its All Gone" (2016), Ma§onic
- "Heavy Lounge #1" (2017), Ma§onic
- "Shazam" (2018), Ma§onic
- "Sex Robot" (2019), Ma§onic
- "Get Down Get With It" (2019), Ma§onic

=== Albums ===
- Super Natural LP (2017), Ma§onic / Hound Gawd! Records

| 1 | Dream | 4:34 |
| 2 | Base Is Loaded | 6:16 |
| 3 | Something's Gonna Get Its Hands On You | 4:53 |
| 4 | No Fool | 4:05 |
| 5 | Aldecide | 3:57 |
| 6 | Boil Your Blood | 3:24 |
| 7 | Shallow Grave | 5:08 |
| 8 | Heavy Lounge #1 | 4:20 |
| 9 | Till It's All Gone | 4:48 |
| 10 | Everybody But Me | 5:39 |

- CollectiV LP (2019), Ma§onic / Cargo Records

| 1 | Sex Robot | 3:06 |
| 2 | Satan's Got His Heart Set On You | 3:32 |
| 3 | O Genie | 4:22 |
| 4 | Attack Of The Killer Brainz | 3:16 |
| 5 | Meth Church | 5:47 |
| 6 | Dark Secrets | 4:22 |
| 7 | I Found A Love | 3:10 |
| 8 | Out Align | 4:50 |
| 9 | Going There Anyway | 3:35 |
| 10 | Shazam | 3:49 |
