= Tichá dohoda =

Czech alternative rock band

- Also known as: 2Wings
- Origin: Czech Republic
- Genres: Alternative rock
- Years active: 1986–1999

Tichá dohoda was a Czech alternative rock band, active from 1986 to 1999. The band was led by songwriter, guitarist and producer Dan Šustr and lead vocalist Blanka Šrůmová. They were known in the Czech pop music scene of the late 1990s for their outspoken attitudes to sex and drugs. They had eight hits in the Czech Republic, several local Grammy award nominations, and released the first Czech unplugged record in 1994, entitled UnplugGag, before being dropped by Sony Music after the release of their last album, Válcovna vkusu s.r.o. in 1998.

The band members reunited in 2006 under the name 2Wings.

== Discography ==
- Chci přežít (I want to survive) (Arta 1990, re-issued by Monitor/EMI in 1995),
- Má duše se vznáší (My Soul is floating) & Gloria, EP (Bonton Music 1991)
- Underpop (Bonton 1992),
- UnplugGag (Monitor 1993) - first ever Czech unplugged record
- Tulák po hvězdách (Starsailor) & Studiosessions, EP (Monitor/EMI 1994)
- Droga v kůži (Drug in Vein), SP (Monitor/EMI 1994)
- "untitled" (Monitor/EMI 1994),
- Kde spí andělé (Where the angels sleep) & Heroin, EP (Monitor/EMI 1995)
- La Décadance (Monitor/EMI 1995),
- CD-ROM "Fucktography" (Studio DADA 1995)
- Live in Lucerna Music Bar (Illegal Records 1997)
- Válcovna vkusu s.r.o (Public Image Mill Plant ltd.) (Sony Music 1998),
- Největší hity (Greatest Hits) (Sony Music 1999)

TD featuring Phil Shoenfelt

- Tichá dohoda with Phil Shoenfelt Live in Prague (Bonton 1995)

Blanka and the Shroom Party (experimental electronic project by Dan Šustr and Blanka Šrůmová)

- Psychoerotic Cabaret (Illegal Records 1997)
