= Phil Shoenfelt =

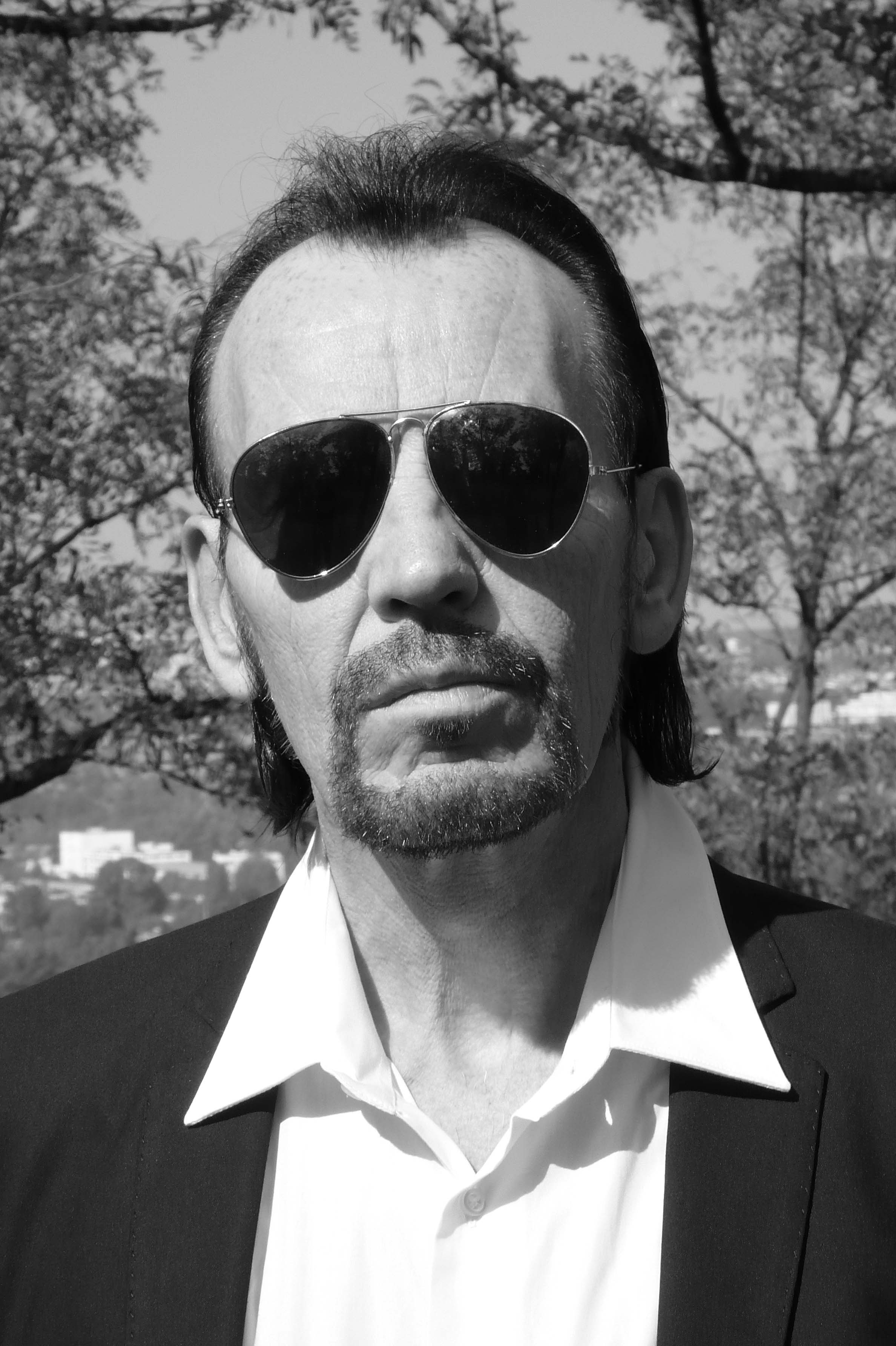

Background information
- Born: 18 December 1952 (age 72)
- Origin: Bradford, England
- Genres: Indie rock, gothic rock, post-punk
- Website: http://www.philshoenfelt.de

Phil Shoenfelt (born 18 December 1952 in Bradford, England) is an English musician and author who lived for many years in New York City and who now lives in Prague, Czech Republic.

== As a musician ==
In New York, in the early 1980s, he played with punk band the Nothing, as well as with East Village new wave band Disturbed Furniture, and founded the post-punk band Khmer Rouge together with Barry "Scratchy" Myers (tour DJ of the Clash) and Marcia Schofield (future keyboard player of the Fall). From 1983 to 1984, Khmer Rouge was managed by noted photographer and Andy Warhol collaborator Nat Finkelstein. They were frequently performing in the CBGB and have opened events for Alan Vega, the Gun Club, Tom Verlaine, Nico, and the Clash.

In 1989 his first solo EP, Charlotte's Room, was released by Mark E. Smith's label Cog Sinister. The title track and the B-side "The Long Goodbye" were mixed by Tony Cohen and Mark E. Smith. He also opened events for the Fall.

One year later, Paperhouse Records put out his first solo album Backwoods Crucifixion, and in 1993 Shoenfelt's second album God Is the Other Face of the Devil was released by Humbug Records.

He also opened events for Nick Cave and the Bad Seeds in the UK.

Since 1995, Shoenfelt has lived in Prague, where he put together his current band, Phil Shoenfelt & Southern Cross. With Southern Cross he has recorded five albums to date (Blue Highway, Dead Flowers for Alice, Ecstatic, Paranoia.com and The Bell Ringer) as well as one EP, Electric Garden.

In 1997, Shoenfelt founded a new band Fatal Shore, together with Bruno Adams and Chris Hughes (both ex-members of Once Upon a Time). They made three CDs – Fatal Shore, Free Fall and Real World – and toured widely in Europe and the US until Adams succumbed to colon cancer in 2009.

Shoenfelt also collaborated with Nikki Sudden. On Sudden's 1997/1998 European tour, Shoenfelt was the lead guitarist. After the tour ended, Sudden and Shoenfelt went into a Berlin studio and recorded Golden Vanity, which was finally released in 2009 by UK label Easy Action Records.

Phil Shoenfelt & Southern Cross released their fourth studio album Paranoia.com on 1 November 2010. This album contains nine original songs and a cover version of Iggy Pop & the Stooges' "Open Up and Bleed".

Together with the Australian ex-pat musicians Chris Hughes and Dave Allen, Shoenfelt formed a new band called Dim Locator in 2011 – named after a Rowland S. Howard song on the Birthday Party's Junkyard LP. Based in Berlin, Dim Locator plays heavy, repetitive, riff-based rock music, inspired by 1970s kraut rock bands such as Can, Neu and La Düsseldorf.

Shoenfelt's most recent release is a vinyl album called Under the Radar on German label Last Year's Youth. Under the Radar is a partial career retrospective spanning the years 1981 to 1997. It includes previously unreleased rarities, such as Khmer Rouge's appearance at the 1981 White Columns Noise Fest, a nine-day festival of New York noise bands curated by Thurston Moore of Sonic Youth.

On 10 January 2020, Shoenfelt's new solo studio album Cassandra Lied was released by the German label Sireena Records. The album was recorded between August 2018 and November 2019 in Prague, with contributions from several musicians such as Kristof Hahn (Swans), Marcia Schofield (ex-the Fall), Chris Hughes (Hugo Race & the True Spirit) and Eva Turnová.

== As an author ==
As well as being a singer/songwriter, Shoenfelt is a published and awarded author with books translated in several languages. His autobiographical novel Junkie Love won the Firecracker Alternative Book Award (2002) in New York. The novel is available in the original English, as well as in Czech and Italian translations. An extract has appeared in Erotika – Drogen und Sexualitat by German philosopher Wolfgang Sterneck, along texts by Charles Bukowski, W. S. Burroughs, Nick Cave, Irvine Welsh, Marilyn Manson and others.

He has also written the afterword for the Czech edition of Nick Cave's book And the Ass Saw the Angel ("A uzřela oslice anděla", 1995).

== Discography ==
- 1988 Charlotte's Room / The Long Goodbye (EP)
- 1990 Backwoods Crucifixion (LP/CD)
- 1993 God Is the Other Face of the Devil (CD)
- 1995 Live in Prague! (with Ticha dohoda) (MC/CD)
- 1997 Blue Highway (CD)
- 1997 Fatal Shore (with Fatal Shore) (CD)
- 1999 Dead Flowers for Alice (CD)
- 2002 "Electric Garden" (CD single)
- 2002 Ecstatic (CD)
- 2003 Free Fall (with Fatal Shore) (CD)
- 2004 Deep Horizon – Selected Songs of Phil Shoenfelt (2-CD)
- 2004 New York – London 1981–86 (with Khmer Rouge) (2-CD)
- 2007 Real World (with Fatal Shore) (CD)
- 2008 Live at the House of Sin (Phil Shoenfelt & Pavel Cingl) (2008)
- 2009 Golden Vanity (Nikki Sudden & Phil Shoenfelt) (CD)
- 2010 "Open Up & Bleed" (download single)
- 2010 Paranoia.com (CD)
- 2011 Immortalised (with Dim Locator, download EP)
- 2011 Setting the Sails for El Dorado (with Fatal Shore) (CD)
- 2012 Performing Songs by Rowland S. Howard (with Dim Locator) (7")
- 2013 Wormhole (with Dim Locator) (EP, CD and 10" vinyl)
- 2015 The Bell Ringer – Live at the Shot-Out Eye (Phil Shoenfelt & Southern Cross, CD)
- 2018 Out of the Sky – Real World Demos (Phil Shoenfelt & Bruno Adams, CD)
- 2019 Under the Radar (12" vinyl)
- 2020 Cassandra Lied (CD)
