= The Very Crystal Speed Machine =

Studio album by Thee Hypnotics
- Released: 1994
- Studio: Rumbo
- Genres: Hard rock, garage rock, psychedelic rock
- Label: American
- Producer: Chris Robinson

Thee Hypnotics chronology
Soul, Glitter & Sin (1991)	The Very Crystal Speed Machine (1994)

The Very Crystal Speed Machine is an album by the English hard rock band Thee Hypnotics, released in 1994.

The band promoted the album by touring with You Am I and Tripmaster Monkey.

== Production ==
The album was produced by Chris Robinson, who proved to be a taskmaster in the studio; Robinson had persuaded American Recordings to sign the band. Recorded at Rumbo Recorders, in Canoga Park, Los Angeles, California, it includes contributions from Black Crowes Eddie Harsch and Marc Ford. Four of the songs are instrumentals. "Goodbye" is about the death of former bass player Craig Pike.

== Critical reception ==
Professional ratings
Review scores
Source	Rating
AllMusic	4/5 stars
Calgary Herald	B
The Encyclopedia of Popular Music	3/5 stars
Rock Hard	8.0/10

Trouser Press concluded that "the album completes Thee Hypnotics’ transition from self-conscious fetishists aping a vintage sound to dedicated retroids ready to join the real things in the road-goes-ever-on trenches." The Washington Post thought that "Ray Hanson's guitar still has an appealing swagger that gives its familiar blue-rock riffs a contemporary edge, and tracks like 'Ray's Baudelaire' and 'Peasant Song', if minor, are distinctively eccentric." The Calgary Herald declared that Thee Hypnotics "do to the head what the Black Crowes do to the soul."

The New York Times determined that "making good, original rock-and-roll usually means executing an effective synthesis of styles, but Thee Hypnotics kept its influences separate." The Province opined that the band "are the closest they've come to getting the balance right between citing their sources (in the early days it was The Stooges and MC5) and finding their own voice." The Arizona Daily Star called The Very Crystal Speed Machine "one of the finest mainstream rock albums of the year so far."

AllMusic deemed the album "a finely crafted piece of classic rock, much more inspired than the last Thee Hypnotics album."

== Track listing ==
No.	Title	Length
1.	"Keep Rollin' On"
2.	"Heavy Liquid"
3.	"Phil's Drum Acropolis"
4.	"Goodbye"
5.	"If the Good Lord Loves Ya"
6.	"Ray's Baudelaire"
7.	"Caroline Inside Out"
8.	"Tie It Up"
9.	"Down in the Hole"
10.	"Peasant Song"
11.	"Fragile"
12.	"Look What You've Done"
13.	"Broken Morning Has"
