= Blanka Šrůmová =

Czech singer-songwriter (born 1965)

- Born: 24 August 1965 (age 60); Prague, Czechoslovakia
- Genres: Rock
- Occupation: Musician
- Instrument: Guitar
- Years active: 1989–present
- Formerly of: Tichá dohoda

Blanka Šrůmová (born 24 August 1965 in Prague) is a Czech singer-songwriter.

== Career ==
She joined Tichá dohoda in 1989; in 1990 their debut album Chci přežít was released. Her first solo album was released in 2000, entitled Neviditelná. She took some time off to raise her son, including nine months spent in Peru, and her next album Underground was released in 2005. She also collaborated with the Czech folk band Kamelot.

== Discography ==
- Blanka and The Shroom Party - Psychoerotic Cabaret (1997)
- Neviditelná (2000)
- Underground (2005)
- Divokej Praha – Západ (2014)
