= Palookaville =

Palookaville may refer to:

- Palookaville (film), a 1995 comedy film
- Palookaville (album), a 2004 electronic album by Fatboy Slim
- Palookaville (comics), an alternative comic book

== See also ==
- Palooka (disambiguation)
