= Nat Finkelstein =

American photographer

- Born: Nathan Louis Finkelstein; January 16, 1933; Brooklyn, New York, U.S.
- Died: October 2, 2009 (aged 76); Shandaken, New York, U.S.
- Known for: Photography

Nathan Louis "Nat" Finkelstein (January 16, 1933 – October 2, 2009) was an American photographer and photojournalist. Finkelstein studied photography under Alexey Brodovitch, the art director of Harper's Bazaar and worked as a photojournalist for the Black Star and PIX photo agencies, reporting primarily on the political developments of various subcultures in New York City in the 1960s. In 1964, Finkelstein entered Andy Warhol's Factory as a photojournalist and remained for three years; Finkelstein's photographs from this period are now regarded as some of the most iconic of the time.

== Early life ==
Nat Finkelstein was born on January 16, 1933, in Brooklyn and grew up in Coney Island, where his father worked as a cab driver. Finkelstein graduated from Stuyvesant High School in 1950 and in 1952 he enrolled in Brooklyn College, where he first became interested in photography through the inspiration that he found in great photographers such as Edward Steichen. It was also here that developed his militant political tendencies, to the extent that he was expelled during his final semester after he threw a filing cabinet through a window to protest censorship of a campus publication.

== Career ==
After his expulsion, he managed to acquire an internship with the art director of Harper's Bazaar, Alexey Brodovitch (who famously brought Cocteau, Chagall, and Man Ray to illustrate the magazine). Brodovitch took a liking to the feisty boy from Brooklyn and allowed him to assist on fashion shoots. Fashion journalism led to photojournalism for Sport's Illustrated, covering events like bridge tournaments, dog shows, chess, and fencing matches. Finkelstein was signed by the PIX and Black Star agencies (the latter supplied Life magazine with much imagery) through which he was able to meet and spend time with established photographers Robert Capa, Eugene Smith, and Andreas Feininger. He specialized in chronicling the various subcultures of the United States at the time, an interest that led him to Harlem's burgeoning jazz and soul scenes, Warhol's factory, and later to cover the antiwar rallies and emerging counterculture.

=== Andy Warhol and The Factory ===
In September 1962 Finkelstein was commissioned by Pageant magazine to do an article on the emerging Pop Art movement. The article was titled "What happens at a Happening?" it covered a Claes Oldenburg "happening" in Greenwich Village and was a break that would define his future. Two years later, while attending a party at the Factory, Finkelstein met Warhol, who had seen his photographs of Oldenburg's "happening" in Pageant. Finkelstein offered his services as a photographer to the artist, and for the next three years he was a constant presence at the Factory. His iconic images of the include subjects such as the Velvet Underground performing live, Marcel Duchamp, Bob Dylan, Edie Sedgwick, Salvador Dalí, and Allen Ginsberg.

=== Political activist and fugitive ===
During his time at the Factory, Finkelstein was also involved with other affairs. A political radical, he helped organize civil rights rallies and anti-war demonstration and also became involved with the Black Panthers. As a result, in 1969 a warrant was issued for the arrest of Finkelstein in connection with an old drug case. He fled the United States, claiming he was worried that the government might try to assassinate him. He spent the next decade as a fugitive, following the Silk Road through the Middle East and selling hashish to support himself.

=== Return to the U.S. and drug addiction ===
Finkelstein returned to the United States in 1982 when he became aware that charges against him had been dropped. He became involved in the New York punk music scene, managing bands such as Khmer Rouge (featuring Phil Shoenfelt), whose members he used as photographic subjects. He made frequent visits to Bolivia to nourish an addiction to cocaine.

The death of Warhol in 1987 came as a wake-up call to Finkelstein and by 1989 he had weaned himself off the drugs and reignited his career in photography. His affinity for subcultures remained and in the 1990s he spent time as part of the rave scene, first in London, then Amsterdam, and back to New York. He shot a generation of New York club kids, a group that he recorded in his 1993 book Merry Monsters. Finkelstein now found himself in constant demand, he had over seventy-five solo and group shows at museums and galleries worldwide. His images appeared in magazines such as Life, Time, Sport's Illustrated, Harper's & Queen, Vogue and The New York Times Magazine.

== Death ==
Finkelstein died of complications from pneumonia and emphysema at his home in Shandaken, New York on October 2, 2009. He was 76. His first four marriages ended in divorce. In addition to his wife, Elizabeth, he is survived by a brother, Howard. At the time of his death, he was near completing a memoir entitled The Fourteen-Ounce Pound.

== Quotes ==
"I watched pop die and punk being born."

== Exhibitions ==
Finkelstein exhibited his work worldwide in over seventy-five solo and group shows at museums and galleries including the Cedar Bar, the International Center of Photography, Whitney Museum of American Art, New York; the Andy Warhol Museum, Pittsburgh; Tate Modern, Victoria and Albert Museum, The Photographer's Gallery, the Saatchi Gallery, London; and the Ludwig Museum, Budapest, among many others. Finkelstein's photographs are in the collection of The Metropolitan Museum of Art, The Brooklyn Museum of Art, and The Andy Warhol Foundation, New York; The Victoria and Albert Museum, London; The Stedelijk Museum, Amsterdam; Stedelijk Museum voor Actuele Kunst, Ghent; Ludwig Museum, Cologne; and the Centre Georges Pompidou, Paris, among many other public and private collections. There is a retrospective exhibition of his work at the Idea Generation Gallery, London, starting in December 2009, and his work will also feature in the exhibition "Who Shot Rock" at the Brooklyn Museum, New York, from the end of October 2009.

== Books ==
- The Andy Warhol Index (1967)
- Andy Warhol: The Factory Years, 1964-1967 (1989, ISBN 1-57687-090-1)
- Girlfriends (1991)
- Merry Monsters (1993)
- Edie: Factory Girl (2006, compiled with David Dalton)
