= Change My Life (Epic Soundtracks album) =

Studio album by Epic Soundtracks
- Released: 1996
- Genre: Pop
- Label: Bar/None
- Producer: Henry Olsen, Epic Soundtracks

Epic Soundtracks chronology
Debris (1995)	Change My Life (1996)	Everything Is Temporary (1999)

Change My Life is the final studio album by the English musician Epic Soundtracks, released in 1996, a year before his death. It was his third album for Bar/None Records. A North American tour to support the album was canceled when the United States Customs Service refused to allow Soundtracks to enter the country, allegedly because the agency considered his earlier Chicago band practices to be paying live dates.

== Production ==
The album was produced primarily by Henry Olsen. Luke Haines assisted Soundtracks during the recording sessions. "Nighttime" and "Thirteen" are covers of the Alex Chilton songs, included as a bonus track.

== Critical reception ==
Professional ratings
Review scores
Source	Rating
AllMusic	4/5 stars
Alternative Rock	8/10
Calgary Herald	3.5/5 stars
The Encyclopedia of Popular Music	3/5 stars
MusicHound Rock: The Essential Album Guide	4/5 stars

The Calgary Herald said that the "songs sound like Spector or Wilson stripped bare, like Thunders turned prissy and a whole lot like Chilton." The Province concluded that the album "seems to be a conscious attempt to pay tribute to his pre-punk pop influences, notably Brian Wilson minus the lush Beach Boys harmonies but with the lilting sweep of Pet Sounds-era melodies." CMJ New Music Monthly called the album "bland, sentimental nonsense—i.e., wonderful pop music."

AllMusic opined that when Soundtracks "tries to rock harder, the results are strained and awkward, as his voice isn't strong enough to carry raucous material." Trouser Press noted that "Stealaway" "adds horns and tubular bells (!) to the mix and allows him to indulge his Spectorsound obsession."

== Track listing ==
No.	Title	Length
1.	"You Can Be My Baby"
2.	"Stealaway"
3.	"The Rain Came Down"
4.	"Something's Wrong"
5.	"Sweet Sixteen"
6.	"Landslide"
7.	"Ring the Bells"
8.	"Wild Child"
9.	"Sleepy City"
10.	"There's a Light Up in the Sky"
11.	"The Wishing Well"
12.	"Nighttime/Thirteen"
