= Soul, Glitter & Sin =

Studio album by Thee Hypnotics
- Released: 1991
- Genre: Rock
- Label: Situation Two
- Producer: John Leckie

Thee Hypnotics chronology
| Come Down Heavy (1990) | Soul, Glitter & Sin (1991) | The Very Crystal Speed Machine (1994) |

Soul, Glitter & Sin is an album by the English band Thee Hypnotics, released in 1991. They supported it by opening for the Black Crowes on a UK tour, followed by a North American tour.

== Production ==
The album was produced by John Leckie. Robert Zyn joined the band prior to the recording sessions. Thee Hypnotics made more use of distortion and included a horn section on some tracks. They used a marimba on "Black River Shuffle". "Samedi's Cookbook" appears only on the CD version.

== Critical reception ==
Professional ratings
Review scores
| Source | Rating |
|---|---|
| AllMusic | 3/5 stars |
| Alternative Rock | 6/10 |
| The Boston Phoenix | 3/4 stars |
| Calgary Herald | A |
| The Encyclopedia of Popular Music | 3/5 stars |
| The Great Alternative & Indie Discography | 5/10 |

The Los Angeles Times noted, "Every song features endless, mindless and senseless guitar solos. The 10 songs actually sound like one long song with 10 short pauses." The Guardian praised the "sinister slow blues" and "macabre swamp shimmy". The Rocket concluded that "they're still rabid around the edges, but Thee Hypnotics have banked the fires that made them initially so attractive." The Penn said that "the sound is neither riff- nor groove-based... It just kind of bangs and clangs with no direction." The Blade labeled the band "a horn-metal unit".

AllMusic called Thee Hypnotics "a great rock band that hasn't locked itself into one modern format". The Trouser Press Record Guide opined that Soul, Glitter & Sin "drifts into psychedelic lassitude, either heading off in too many directions at once or simply running out of ideas."

== Track listing ==
| No. | Title | Length |
|---|---|---|
| 1. | "Shakedown" |
| 2. | "Kissed by the Flames" |
| 3. | "The Big Fix" |
| 4. | "Point Blank Mystery" |
| 5. | "Soul Accelerator" |
| 6. | "Black River Shuffle" |
| 7. | "Cold Blooded Love" |
| 8. | "Samedi's Cookbook" |
| 9. | "Don't Let It Get You Down" |
| 10. | "Coast to Coast" |
