= Nikki Sudden =

English singer-songwriter and guitarist (1956–2006)

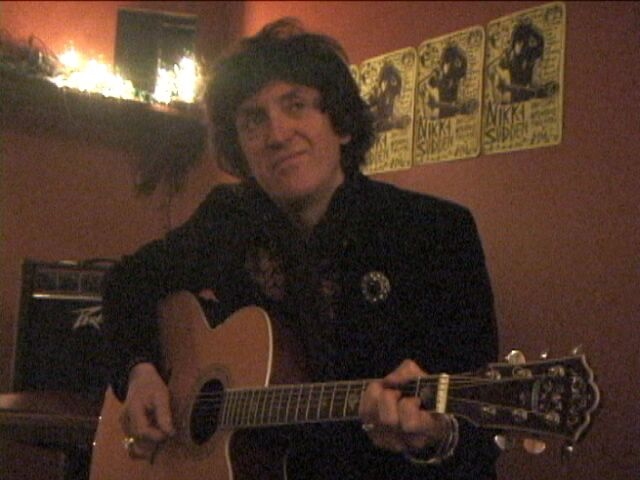
- Nikki Sudden at Cake Shop in New York City on 24 March 2006, two days before his death.

Background information
- Born: Adrian Nicholas Godfrey; 19 July 1956; London, England
- Died: 26 March 2006 (aged 49) New York City, U.S.
- Genre: Rock
- Occupations: Singer-songwriter, musician, rock critic
- Instruments: Guitar, vocals
- Years active: 1977–2006
- Labels: Creation, Glass, UFO Records, Glitterhouse

Adrian Nicholas Godfrey (19 July 1956 – 26 March 2006), known professionally as Nikki Sudden, was a prolific English singer-songwriter and guitarist. He co-founded the post-punk band Swell Maps with his brother, Epic Soundtracks, while attending Solihull School in Solihull.

== Career ==
Nikki Sudden was born Adrian Nicholas Godfrey in London, England. The main influences on Sudden's music were artists such as T. Rex, the Rolling Stones, the Faces, Bob Dylan and Johnny Thunders. Following the break-up of Swell Maps in 1980, he started a solo career and also released records with Dave Kusworth as the Jacobites. In 1991, he released single "I Belong to You" from the album The Jewel Thief. The album was recorded during a brief period when Sudden guested at R.E.M. guitarist Peter Buck's home in Athens, Georgia. According to Sudden, the inspiration for the song came from Roger McGuinn's "King of the Hill" song. The song was later collected on the 2000 compilation The Last Bandit: The Best of Nikki Sudden.

The album *Red Brocade* was released in 1999 on multiple labels internationally, including:

- Chatterbox Records (US) - CHCD-04
- Wagging Dog (UK) - WAGG0005
- Vicious Kitten Records (Australia) - VKR 004
- Glitterhouse Records (Germany) - GRCD 448

The album was re-released in 2022 as a 2× vinyl LP by Bang! Records under catalog number BANG!-LP158.

Sudden collaborated with Mike Scott and Anthony Thistlethwaite of the Waterboys, Jeff Tweedy of Wilco, The Golden Horde as 'The Last Bandits', Mick Taylor of the Rolling Stones, Rowland S. Howard, Jeremy Gluck of the Barracudas, Ian McLagan of Small Faces and the Faces, Phil Shoenfelt, Al DeLoner of Midnight Choir, Tom Ashton of the March Violets, members of R.E.M. and Sonic Youth. The Jacobites' tune "Pin Your Heart" was covered on the Lemonheads' 1997 single "The Outdoor Type". Post Swell Maps, Sudden formed and recorded as Bingo Little with Andy Bean and Cally Callomon.

Sudden also wrote for a number of music magazines, such as Spex, INTRO, Mojo, the Birmingham-based fanzine Waxstreet Dive, and Bucketfull of Brains. At the time of his death, he was writing his autobiography, as well as a history of the Wick (a house in Richmond, London once owned by Ronnie Wood and later Pete Townshend), and was due to perform in London on 29 March 2006. Sudden died of a heart attack at the age of 49 after performing at the Knitting Factory.

== Reissues ==
In September 2013, it was announced that The Numero Group would reissue a series of Sudden's albums on vinyl, with Waiting on Egypt, The Bible Belt, Jacobites, and Robespierre's Velvet Basement scheduled for November 2013 release, and releases Texas, Dead Men Tell No Tales, and Kiss You Kidnapped Charabanc scheduled for February 2014.

== Discography ==
=== Swell Maps ===
==== Albums ====
- A Trip to Marineville (1979)
- Jane from Occupied Europe (1980)

==== Compilations ====
- Whatever Happens Next... (1981)
- Collision Time (1981)
- Train Out of It (1986)
- Collision Time Revisited (1989)
- International Rescue (1999)
- Sweep the Desert (2000)
- Wastrels and Whippersnappers (2006)

==== Singles ====
- "Read About Seymour" (1977)
- "Dresden Style" (1978)
- "Real Shocks" (1979)
- "Let's Build a Car" (1979)

=== The Jacobites ===
==== Studio albums ====
- Jacobites (1984, Glass Records)
- Robespierre's Velvet Basement (1985, Glass Records)
- Lost in a Sea of Scarves (1985, What's So Funny About)
- Texas (1986)
- Dead Men Tell No Tales (1988)
- Howling Good Times (1993, Regency Sound)
- Old Scarlett (1995, Glitterhouse/EfA)
- God Save Us Poor Sinners (1998, Glitterhouse/EfA/Bomp! Records) (2 editions with different track lists)

==== Compilations ====
- The Ragged School (1985, US – Vinyl-Sampler for North America, Twintone)
- Fortune of Fame (1988, Glass Records, Sampler)
- Heart of Hearts (1995, Por Caridad Producciones, Sampler)
- Hawks Get Religion (1996, Regency Sound, Sampler)

==== Live albums ====
- Kiss of Life (1996, n.UR-Kult Releases, Swamp Room Records)

==== Singles ====
- "Shame for the Angels E.P." (1984, Glass Records)
- "Pin Your Heart to Me" (1985, Glass Records)
- "When the Rain Comes" (1986, Glass Records) from "Robespierre´s Velvet Basement"
- "Jangle Town" (1987) from Texas
- "Margaritta" (1993, Regency Sound) comes with "Howling Good Times" LP
- "Don´t You Ever Leave Me" (1993, Regency Sound) from "Howling Good Times"
- "Over and Over" (1997, Ultra Under Records)
- "Teenage Christmas" (1998, Chatterbox Records) comes with "God Save Us Poor Sinners" LP
- "The Otter Song" (2011, Sunthunder Records)

=== Solo ===
==== Albums ====
- Waiting on Egypt (1982)
- The Bible Belt (1983)
- Kiss You Kidnapped Charabanc [with Rowland S. Howard] (1987)
- Crown of Thorns (1988)
- Groove [as Nikki Sudden & the French Revolution] (1989)
- The Jewel Thief [with R.E.M.] (1991)
- Seven Lives Later (1996)
- From the Warwick Road to the Banks of the Nile (1997)
- Egyptian Roads (1997)
- Red Brocade [with the Chamberstrings] (1999)
- Treasure Island (2004)
- The Truth Doesn't Matter (2006 album)
- Golden Vanity (2009) [posthumous release with Phil Shoenfelt, original recording from 1998]

==== Compilations, live, reissues ====
- Back to the Coast (1990)
- Liquor, Guns and Ammo (with R.E.M.) (2000) re-release of The Jewel Thief
- The Last Bandit (2000)
- The Nikki Sudden Compendium (2001)
- Tel Aviv Blues (2011, CD, acoustic recording from 2002)
- Playing With Fire (2011, CD, Outtakes from "Treasure Island" & "The Truth Doesn't Matter")
- The Boy From Nowhere Who Fell Out Of The Sky (2013, 6xCD Box Set)
- Still Full of Shocks (2013, CD, Limited Edition, Live Acoustic Session)
- Fred Beethoven (2014, CD and Limited Blue Vinyl LP, original recordings from 1997 to 1999)
- The Copenhagen Affair (2014, CD, Limited Edition, Live Recording from Barbue, Copenhagen, 27 November 1991)
- Christmas Day Blues (2014, CD, Limited Edition, Live Recording from Hamburg, 25 December 1985)
- Quasimodo (2016, CD, Live Recording from Quasimodo Club, Berlin, 5 March 2003)
- The Last Bandits in the World (2018, CD and Limited LP, original recordings from 1985, with Simon Carmody & Johnny Fean)

==== Singles ====
- "Back to the Start" (1981)
- "Channel Steamer" (1982) from Waiting on Egypt
- "Wedding Hotel" (1987) from Kiss You Kidnapped Charabanc
- "Lunacy Is Legend EP" (1987)
- "The Angels Are Calling" (1989)
- "The Sun Is Shining" (1990) from The Jewel Thief
- "I Belong to You" (1991) from The Jewel Thief
- "Buick MacKane" (1991)
- "Whiskey Priest" (1992) from Seven Lives Later
- "Bourgeois Blues" (1992)
- "So Many Girls" (1999) from Red Brocade
- "Hanoi Jane" (2005) from Golden Vanity
- "Barroom Blues" (2006)

=== Nikki Sudden and Freddy Lynxx ===
- By The Lights of the Burning Citroen (1997, Sucksex, Cassette Only Release)

=== with Freddy Lynxx ===
- No Pleasure Thrills (1996, Sucksex, LP)
- "No Pleasure Thrills / Open Up & Bleed“ (1996, Sucksex, 7")
- "Soul Power / Opium-Den“ (1999, Sucksex, 7")
- "Have Faith" (1999, Vicious Kitten, EP)
- Full Cover (2004, Sucksex, CD)

=== with Ghost Train ===
- "All My Sunken Ships / You Knocked Me Out Cold (In The Big Hotel)“ (1996, Sucksex, 7")

=== Bibliography ===
- The Last Bandit – A Rock´n`Roll Life by Nikki Sudden (2011, Italy – Arcana Edizioni Srl)

=== Movieology ===
- Under the Milky Way (1996, Germany – Director: Matthias X. Oberg) – Nikki Sudden & Dave Kusworth play two drunken musicians on a train
- "Planet Alex" (2001, Germany – Director: Uli M. Schüppel) – Nikki Sudden plays a drunkard
- "Far East Man" (2002, Live Concert of Ron Wood at Shepherds Bush Empire, 11 December 2001) – Nikki Sudden is standing in the audience in front of Ron Wood and can be seen several times
- "Honey Baby" (2004, Germany – Director: Mika Kaurismäki, Music: Nikki Sudden)
- Egoshooter (2004, Germany – Directors: Oliver Schwabe and Christian Becker, Music: Nikki Sudden a.o. – Nikki Sudden has a small role as himself)
- "The Favor" (2006, US – Director: Eva Aridjis, Music: Nikki Sudden (end credits), Swell Maps (soundtrack)
- "The Pacific and Eddy" (2006, US – Director: Matthew Nourse, Music: Jacobites, Nikki Sudden, Epic Soundtracks) – Nikki Sudden as Silhouette
- "Last Time in Berlin – Nikki Sudden Documentary" (2006 – Director: Daniel Horn, Music: Jacobites, Nikki Sudden, a. o.) – unreleased
