= Swell Maps =

English experimental band

- Origin: Birmingham, England
- Genres: Punk rock; experimental rock; post-punk; art punk
- Years active: 1972–1980
- Labels: Rather Records, Rough Trade, Mute
- Past members: Epic Soundtracks (Kevin Godfrey); Nikki Sudden (Adrian Godfrey); Jowe Head (Stephen Bird); Biggles Books (Richard Earl Scaldwell); Phones B. Sportsman (David Barrington); Golden Cockrill (John Cockrill)

Swell Maps was an English experimental DIY, early punk and post-punk rock group from Birmingham, England active in various forms between 1972 and 1980. Influenced by bands such as T. Rex and German krautrock groups such as Can and Faust, they went on to be influential to many others in the post-punk era.

== History ==
Although it had existed in various forms since 1972, Swell Maps formed into a coherent musical entity after the beginning of British punk. The band consisted of Solihull teenagers Epic Soundtracks (real name Kevin Paul Godfrey), his brother Nikki Sudden (real name Adrian Nicholas Godfrey), Jowe Head (Stephen Bird), Biggles Books (Richard Scaldwell), Phones Sportsman (David Barrington) and John "Golden" Cockrill. The band released the single "Read About Seymour" in 1977. The Guardian's production editor Campbell Stevenson cited it as one of 25 classic punk singles, and is referenced in the song "Part Time Punks" by Television Personalities.

After recording their first John Peel session Swell Maps went into WMRS studio to record their first album, A Trip to Marineville, which was released in 1979. They recorded a second album, Swell Maps in "Jane From Occupied Europe", in 1980.

The band toured Belgium, the Netherlands and Italy before splitting up in April 1980. A double album of archival recordings and Peel sessions, Whatever Happens Next..., was released shortly afterwards, but unlike the first two LPs, it has not been reissued since.

== Side projects ==
The band backed Steve Treatment on an EP, released on their own Rather Records label in 1978. They also backed The Cult Figures on a single "Zip Nolan", released on the Rough Trade label in 1979. An EP of experimental tracks of the band backing Phones Sportsman was released under the name of the Phones Sportsman Band in 1980.

== Subsequent activities ==
The Swell Maps back catalogue has been remastered and reissued, and several compilations of archive recordings released.

Soon after the band's split Soundtracks and Head released a single, "Rain, Rain, Rain", on Rough Trade, intended to be the first release from a forthcoming album, Daga Daga Daga, which was not completed – until Head rediscovered the tapes in 2023; the album was released in 2024. Richard Scaldwell (Biggles Books) released an album in 1981, The Egg Store Ilk, under the name "Richard Earl", but retired from music thereafter. Other members of the band continued to make music; Nikki Sudden began a solo career as well as working with Dave Kusworth. Epic Soundtracks, who had played drums with the Red Krayola at the same time as Swell Maps were a going concern, joined Crime and the City Solution and also released solo material. Jowe Head has led a career as a musician and visual artist, and was also a member of the Television Personalities for many years.

Epic Soundtracks died of unknown causes at the age of 38 in 1997, and Nikki Sudden died at the age of 49 in March 2006, in a hotel room in New York City.

In 2021, Jowe started a new incarnation of the band, called Swell Maps C21, performing material by all six original members, including recent material written with David Barrington and John Cockrill. The line-up evolved until it settled on a unit involving Jowe and the following six musicians: Lee McFadden, Jeff Bloom, David Callahan, Lucie Rejchrtova, Luke Haines, and Chloe Herington. This project is continuing, and the album C21 was released on 13 March 2026.

== Influence ==
Swell Maps have been cited as an influence by bands including Dinosaur Jr., R.E.M., Nirvana and Pavement. Thurston Moore from Sonic Youth acknowledged the influence of the Swell Maps in 1981, writing, "As soon as that Nikki Sudden guitar comes slicing slabbing and all out fuzzifying off that crackling vinyl groove you know you're gonna rock. It's the best of both whirls: fist-in-the-heart guitar burnin’ rock and ahead-of-its-time songsmith awareness ... The Swell Maps had a lot to do with my upbringing". Scott Kannberg of Pavement said, "Swell Maps was a big influence on our early records ... they had these songs they fucked up somehow to make sound really dirty and low frequency, but they had these great songs underneath all this mess". Tim Gane of Stereolab said that when he first bought A Trip to Marineville, "I must have played it a hundred times or more, just to listen to every single second of it". Other notable bands and artists to cite them an influence include Cornershop, Deerhunter singer and guitarist Bradford Cox, Stephen Pastel of the Pastels, and the Dirtbombs.

In 2007 The Guardian wrote that A Trip to Marineville "combined furious punk noise-outs such as HS Art with ambient instrumentals and other experimental interludes such as Gunboats."

== Discography ==
=== Studio albums ===
- A Trip to Marineville (July 1979) #10 UK Indie
- Jane from Occupied Europe (1980) #4 UK Indie
- C21 (2026)

=== Compilations ===
- Whatever Happens Next... (1981) #25 UK Indie
- Collision Time (1981)
- Train Out of It (Antar 1986) #18 UK Indie
- Collision Time Revisited (1989)
- International Rescue (1999)
- Sweep The Desert (2000)
- Wastrels and Whippersnappers (2006)
- Mayday Signals (2021)

=== Singles ===
- "Read About Seymour" (1977)
- "Dresden Style" (1978)
- "Real Shocks" (1979)
- "Let's Build a Car" (1979) #6 UK Indie

== Bibliography ==
- Neate, Wilson (1995), "Swell Maps: Sweep the Desert", PopMatters, archived from the original on 8 March 2016
- Sarig, Roni (1998), "Swell Maps", Secret History of Rock: The Most Influential Bands You've Never Heard, New York: Billboard Books, pp. 244–246, ISBN 0-8230-7669-5
