= Epic Soundtracks =

British musician (1959–1997)

- Born: Kevin Paul Godfrey; 23 March 1959; Croydon, Surrey, England
- Died: 6 November 1997 (aged 38) West Hampstead, London, England
- Genres: Post-punk, indie rock, alternative rock
- Occupations: Singer-songwriter, musician
- Instruments: Drums, piano, guitar, bass guitar, vocals
- Labels: Rough Trade, Bar/None

Epic Soundtracks was the stage name of the British musician Kevin Paul Godfrey (23 March 1959 – 6 November 1997). Born in Croydon, Surrey, he was brought up in Solihull, West Midlands with his brother Adrian Nicholas Godfrey, who was known as Nikki Sudden (1956–2006).

In 1972, Kevin and Adrian formed the nucleus of what was to become the post-punk rock group Swell Maps, with "Soundtracks" on drums and piano, and "Sudden" on guitar and vocals.

Soundtracks later played drums for Crime & the City Solution and These Immortal Souls. In 1991, Soundtracks decided to focus on his own songwriting career, and began the series of recordings that comprised his three solo records. As a vocalist and multi-instrumentalist he released three critically acclaimed solo albums, and two more were released posthumously.

Notable fans of Soundtracks' solo work include Evan Dando and Thurston Moore. Dave Graney paid tribute to Soundtracks with the song "A Boy Named Epic" on The Royal Dave Graney Show's 2003 album The Brother Who Lived. Arthur Lee's backing band, Baby Lemonade, paid tribute as well, with a song off their 2001 High Life Suite LP called, "Song for Epic".

Epic Soundtracks died in his sleep on 6 November 1997, at his flat in West Hampstead, London. His funeral took place in Leamington Spa Baptist Church on 1 December. The official cause of death was ruled as inconclusive.

== Selected discography ==
- Popular Classical (a.k.a. Jelly, Babies) 7" (1981)
- Rain, Rain, Rain (with Jowe Head) 12" (1982)
- Rise Above (1992)
- Sleeping Star (1994)
- Debris (1995)
- Change My Life (1996)

=== Posthumous releases ===
- Everything is Temporary (1999) [compilation]
- Good Things (2005)
- Wild Smile (2012) [compilation]
- Film Soundtracks (2017)
- Daga Daga Daga (with Jowe Head) (2024)
