= The Jim Jones Revue =

English garage rock band

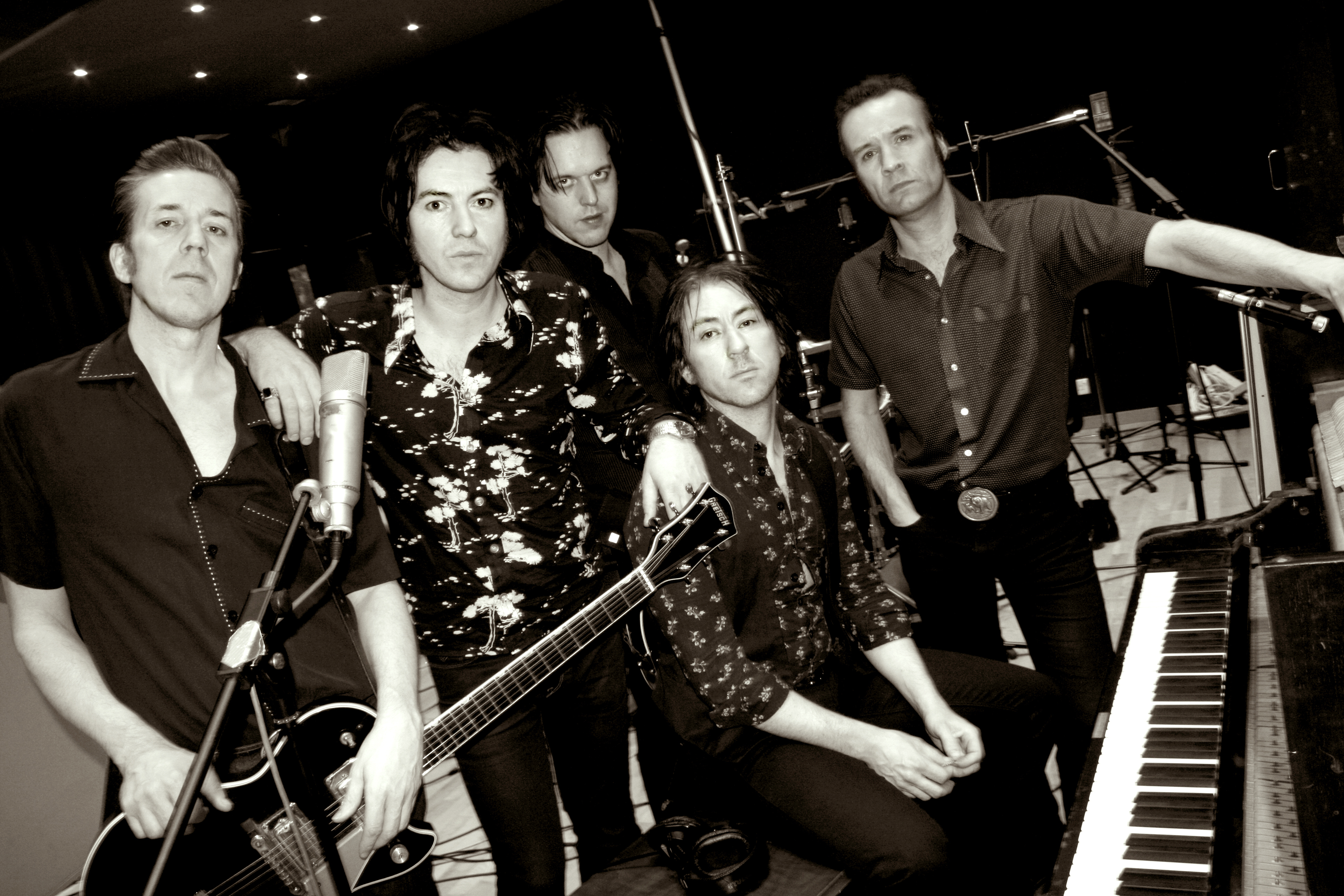

Background information
- Origin: London, England
- Genres: Rock and roll, garage rock revival, punk blues, garage punk
- Years active: 2007–2014
- Labels: Punk Rock Blues Records; PIAS Recordings
- Members: Jim Jones; Rupert Orton; Gavin Jay; Nick Jones; Henri Herbert
- Website: jimjonesrevue.com

The Jim Jones Revue were an English band composed of Jim Jones, Rupert Orton, Nick Jones, Gavin Jay, Elliott Mortimer (later replaced by Henri Herbert) with garage and rock and roll influences.

== History ==
The band was formed after Jim Jones met Rupert Orton (Beth Orton's brother) at his Not The Same Old Blues Crap club night in London. In 2008, the band recorded their self-titled debut album in just 48 hours, in a rehearsal space in Camden Town, London. The album was released on 8 September 2008 via Punk Rock Blues Records.

A collection of singles and B-sides entitled Here to Save Your Soul was released on 5 October 2009.

The band then recorded their second album, Burning Your House Down, which was produced by Jim Sclavunos of Nick Cave and the Bad Seeds and Grinderman. In interview Jim Jones has explained that they also chose Sclavunos for his work with bands like Sonic Youth and The Cramps. This second album was released on 16 August 2011 through Punk Rock Blues Records / PIAS Recordings.

On 2 September 2010, the band previewed Burning Your House Down at London nightclub Madame Jojo's in front of a sold-out audience, which included Oasis singer Liam Gallagher as well as members of Grinderman and Nick Cave and the Bad Seeds.

They appeared on the Late Show with David Letterman (CBS-TV) on 7 September 2011.

The band released their third album The Savage Heart on 12 October 2012 through Punk Rock Blues Records / PIAS Recordings.

The band pianist, Henri Herbert, put on an impromptu performance on a public piano at St. Pancras International train station, London. The video was uploaded on 6 July 2013 and has since gone viral, receiving more than 19,000,000 views.

In June 2014 the band announced that they would cease performing and recording in October 2014 after their "Last Hurrah" tour.

Jim Jones has since been leading the Jim Jones All Stars.

== Musical style ==
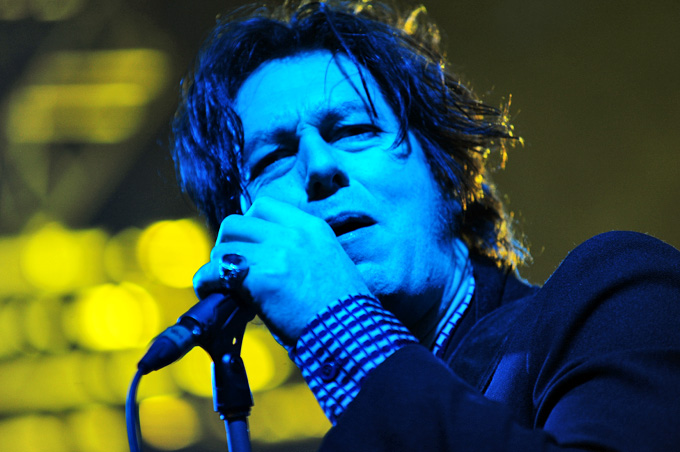
Jim Jones fronting the band at their performance at the 2012 Southbound Festival.

Their style has been compared to early rock and roll artists Little Richard and Jerry Lee Lewis as well as to punk rock bands such as The Stooges, MC5 and Motörhead.

The BBC's Johnny Sharp wrote that the band's "string-shredding guitar, furiously chattering piano and blistering, blustery rhythm" meant that "you’re bombarded with sonic viscera".

In reference to the band's second album, The Guardian's Michael Hann said that, "Burning Your House Down sounds like a gangfight set to 12-bar blues" and that "The Jim Jones Revue imagine that rock'n'roll didn't really need to evolve after 1956; it just needed to get much, much louder, and wildly more distorted".

== Discography ==
=== Albums ===
- The Jim Jones Revue (Punk Rock Blues Records) (2008)
1. "Princess & the Frog"
2. "Hey, Hey, Hey, Hey"
3. "Rock N Roll Psychosis"
4. "Fish 2 Fry"
5. "512"
6. "Another Daze"
7. "Meat Man"
8. "Make It Hot"
9. "Who's Got Mine?"
10. "Cement Mixer"
- Burning Your House Down (Punk Rock Blues Records / PIAS Recordings) (2010)
1. "Dishonest Jon"
2. "High Horse"
3. "Foghorn"
4. "Big Len"
5. "Premeditated"
6. "Burning Your House Down"
7. "Shoot First"
8. "Elemental"
9. "Killin' Spree"
10. "Righteous Wrong"
11. "Stop the People"
- The Savage Heart (2012)
1. "It's Gotta be About Me"
2. "Never Let You Go"
3. "7 Times Around the Sun"
4. "Where Da Money Go?"
5. "Chain Gang"
6. "In and Out of Harm's Way"
7. "Catastrophe"
8. "Eagle Eye Ball"
9. "Midnight Oceans & The Savage Heart"

=== Compilations ===
- Here To Save Your Soul (Punk Rock Blues Records) (2009)
1. "Rock N Roll Psychosis"
2. "Big Hunk O' Love"
3. "Cement Mixer"
4. "Good Golly Miss Molly"
5. "Princess & The Frog"
6. "Freak Of Nature"
7. "Burning Your House Down"
8. "Elemental"

=== Singles ===
- Princess & The Frog (Punk Rock Blues) (2009)
- High Horse (Punk Rock Blues / PIAS Recordings) (2010)
- Shoot First (2010)
- Dishonest John B/W Rocket Orton (28 March 2011)
- It's Gotta Be About Me (28 September 2012)
- Where Da Money Go? (24 December 2012)
