= Jowe Head =

British musician (born 1956)

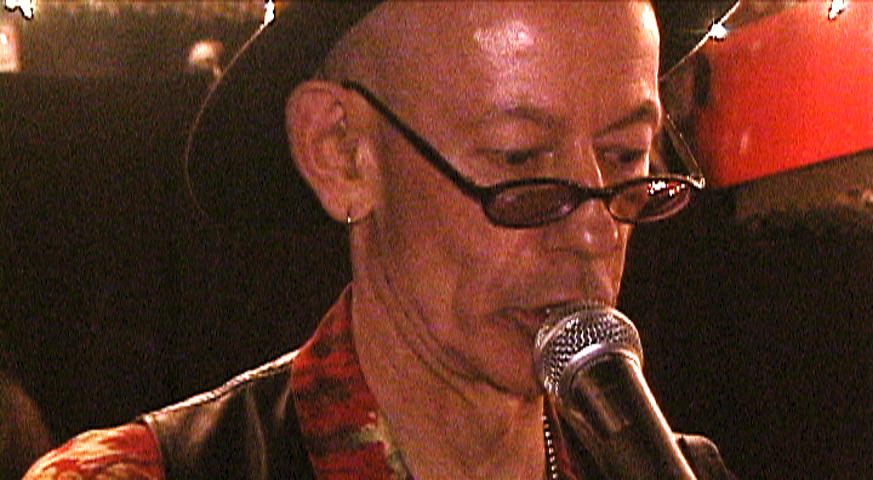

Background information
- Born: Stephen Bird; 1956 (age 69–70); Kidderminster, Worcestershire, England
- Origin: Solihull, West Midlands
- Genres: Experimental music, post punk, punk rock
- Occupations: Singer, guitarist, bass guitarist, record producer, composer, visual artist
- Instruments: guitars, bass guitar, electronics, vocals
- Years active: Mid-1970s–present
- Website: https://jowe-head.com/home

Jowe Head (born Stephen Bird) is a British guitarist, singer, and visual artist, who was a member of Swell Maps before joining the Television Personalities. He has also released a large amount of material as a solo artist and as leader of groups such as Househunters and Palookas.

== Biography ==
Jowe Head (the stage name derived from Birmingham slang for "weirdo") was born Stephen John Bird in 1956 in Kidderminster, Worcestershire, and moved to Solihull at an early age. He started playing in 1973 with Nikki Sudden, Epic Soundtracks and Phones Sportsman in a loose collective that later became known as Swell Maps. He also played with Epic Soundtracks and Ken Spiers (later better known as Spizz) in another local band. With Swell Maps he recorded numerous singles (some under the guise of the Phones Sportsman Band and also backing The Cult Figures) and two albums, before the band split up in 1980.

He then embarked on a solo career, releasing his debut album, Pincer Movement, in 1982. In the mid-1980s he formed a new band, The Palookas, which ran in parallel to his other projects until 1989, and joined the Television Personalities in 1983, staying with the band for the next ten years. His second solo album, Strawberry Deutschmark, was issued in February 1986, featuring contributions from two of his former-Swell Maps colleagues, and singer Carmel. He then led a new band, The Househunters, releasing three singles and an album, Feeding Frenzy, between 1986 and 1988, before again recording as a solo artist. The Jowe Head Personal Organizer was released in 1988. A collection of his work, Unhinged, was issued by Overground Records in 1994. After playing bass in Long Decline, he formed Angel Racing Food.

In 2008 he formed Jowe Head and the Demi-Monde, releasing three albums on Topplers Records, with a line-up including Lee McFadden, Catherine Gerbrands, Jeff Bloom, Marina Young and Jane Ruby. Contributing musicians included Phil Martin, Chloe Herrington, Kate Newell and Heath Stanley. By 2012, the line-up consisted of Jowe and Catherine with Tim Bowen on cello and Ravi Low-Beer on drums.

Following the demise of The Demi-Monde in 2015, Jowe collaborated with other musicians in three projects: Firstly he played synthesiser and various self built devices with Rude Mechanicals, and contributed songs to their repertoire. Secondly, Infernal Contraption, featuring Catherine and Ravi, plus Cos Chapman (of Rude Mechanicals and Alternative TV) and Lee McFadden (of Cult Figures). He also formed a duo called Eleventh Hour Adventists, with Jasmine Pender (of Rotten Bliss).

== Discography ==
See also Swell Maps and Television Personalities.

=== Jowe Head ===
==== Albums ====
- Pincer Movement (1982), Hedonics
- Strawberry Deutschmark (1986), Constrictor
- The Jowe Head Personal Organizer (1988), Hollow Planet
- Unhinged (1994), Overground
- "From a Parallel Universe" (2006) Topplers

"Cabinet of Curios" (2017) Munster (double LP compilation)

==== Singles ====
- "Sudden Shower" (1988), Hollow Planet
- The Legendary EP (1991), Small

=== Compilations ===
- "Classical Music" (1989), Constrictor
- "Falling Uphill" (2004), Windless Air Music

=== Soundtracks and Head ===
==== Albums ====
- Daga Daga Daga (2024), Glass Modern

==== Singles ====
- Rain, Rain, Rain (1982), Rough Trade

=== The Long Decline ===
==== Albums ====
- "Decomposure" (2006), Sniffin' Glue Records

=== Househunters ===
==== Albums ====
- Feeding Frenzy (1988), Hollow Planet

==== Singles ====
- "Cuticles" (1986), 53rd & 3rd
- "Cooler Than Thou" (1988), 53rd & 3rd
- "Warp Factor 13" (1988), Hollow Planet

=== Palookas ===
==== Albums ====
- Gift (1986), Constrictor
- Dump (1987), Constrictor
- Hit The Bottle (1988), Constrictor
- "Schmalookas" (1991), Historia

Rectify(2012)available on downloads

==== Singles ====
- "Clear Day" (1985), Prophet
- "I Want to Be Free" (1987), Constrictor
- "Run Rabbit" (1987), Hollow Planet

=== Angel Racing Food ===
==== Albums ====
- Angel Racing Food (2009), Topplers

==== Singles ====
- "Venus Bigfoot" (2003), Little Teddy Recordings

=== Jowe Head and the Demi-Monde ===
- "Diabolical Liberties" (2010), Topplers
- "Confessions from the Twisted Tower" (2013), Topplers
- "Visionaries" (2015), Topplers
