= Thee Hypnotics =

English psychedelic garage rock band

- Origin: High Wycombe, Buckinghamshire, England
- Genres: Garage rock, psychedelic rock, hard rock, garage punk
- Years active: 1985–1999, 2018
- Labels: Sub Pop, Beggars Banquet/Situation Two, RCA Records, American Records, SPV
- Members: James "Jim" Jones; Ray Hanson; Phil Smith; Jeremy Cottingham
- Past members: Adam Sharam; Chris Dennis; Mark Thompson; Will Pepper; Robert Zyn; Craig Pike; David Ashe

Thee Hypnotics are an English psychedelic garage rock band, formed in 1985 in High Wycombe, Buckinghamshire, England. The band are currently composed of frontman James "Jim" Jones, guitarist Ray Hanson, drummer Phil Smith and bassist Jeremy Cottingham. The band split in 1999, before announcing their reformation in January 2018.

The band recorded three studio and one live album for record labels including Sub Pop, Beggars Banquet/Situation Two, RCA Records, American Records. They were part of the early alternative rock and psychedelic rock London scene, and made an impact on the underground and alternative music scenes in the UK, Europe and the United States.

Co-founders Jones and Hanson were originally joined by drummer Mark Thompson and bassist Adam Sharam. Personnel changes ensued with others including bassists Chris Dennis (1987–88) and Will Pepper (1988–93 and 1994–95), Canadian drummer Phil Smith (1989–99) and bassist Jeremy Cottingham (1997–1999).

== History ==
=== 1987–1989: Live'r Than God! ===
They released their first 7" single "Love In a Different Vein" in 1987 on Vinyl Solution. Thee Hypnotics subsequently signed to Situation Two a subsidiary of the independent record label, Beggars Banquet. The band cemented this union by scoring an independent chart hit with the 12" single "Justice In Freedom" and the follow-up "Soul Trader". Their live album, Live'r Than God (1989), elevated the band out of the UK club scene, and they toured supporting both Gaye Bykers on Acid and Crazyhead, as well as on their own UK tour. In September 1989, Melody Maker noted that "Thee Hypnotics care only for their own generic past and frenetic present. The future doesn't even get a look in... Forget regression, this is reincarnation! Past, present and future!" Thee Hypnotics were asked to do a radio session for BBC Radio 1 DJ John Peel on 28 March 1989, and they recorded "Nine Times", "Love in a Different Vein", "Soul Trader" and "Let's Get Naked", and were previewed on MTV.

Thee Hypnotics began to attract attention in the United States, in particular Seattle where its own alternative rock scene was taking off. Sub Pop made Thee Hypnotics their first UK signing. Sub Pop's release of Live'r Than God! became the band's US debut, and encompassed not only a Powerhaus concert recording but also their singles to date. Thee Hypnotics shared pages with Mudhoney, Screaming Trees and Nirvana in the Seattle publication, Backlash. Seattle became a second home for the band and, after Mark Thomson was replaced by the Canadian drummer Phil Smith, the band made its US tour debut.

The Damned took the band out as their support act. The Lords of the New Church approached Thee Hypnotics lead singer, Jim Jones, to front the Lords but he declined. Subsequently, Stiv Bators wore a T-shirt with a 'singer wanted' advert and then sacked his band onstage. In 1989, Ray Hanson and Jim Jones joined Stiv Bators onstage at The Opera On The Green, Shepherd's Bush, London, as temporary Dead Boys, after Cheetah Chrome failed to secure a work visa.

=== 1990: Come Down Heavy ===
On return from the US, Thee Hypnotics were promoted to the Beggars Banquet label. 1990 saw the band enter Wardour Studios in Soho, London, to record their first studio album, Come Down Heavy. It featured guest appearances from Phil May and Dick Taylor of the Pretty Things, and was mixed in Seattle by Sub Pop's Jack Endino. Come Down Heavy entered at number 2 in the UK Indie Chart. The band were covered in the music press, including pieces in NME, Melody Maker and Kerrang!. Record Collector stated "There are elements of early Stooges in the brutal frontal assault of opener "Half Man Half Boy", which continues into the swagger of "All Messed Up", while Morrison Hotel-era Doors are fused to Revolution Stone. And without a duff track, it's essentially the audio definition of rock'n'roll."

In 1990 they completed their own UK and European tour, as well as supporting The Cramps at the Brixton Academy, Naz Nomad and The Nightmares at the Town and Country Club and the Reading Festival main stage with Mudhoney, Sonic Youth and Nick Cave and the Bad Seeds. Thee Hypnotics embarked on their first major US tour, playing shows with Mudhoney and Screaming Trees, then embarking on a joint headline tour with Tad. On the second leg of their headline tour, with The Smashing Pumpkins as support, the band met with near tragedy. After playing at Prince's club in Minneapolis, a drunk driver ran a red light and crashed into the band's tour bus. The impact of the accident broke drummer Phil Smith's back and hips, leaving him hospitalised for nine months. The rest of the US tour was cancelled and the band returned to the UK to complete live commitments with The Damned drummer, Rat Scabies, standing in while Smith recovered.

Come Down Heavy was also received positively by the band's peers in the US. Fans there included Thurston Moore, Mike McCready and Chris Robinson. The latter of whom championed the band by declaring his adoration for the album, insisting it was the soundtrack on his tour bus, and appearing in a Rolling Stone issued poster wearing a Thee Hypnotics t-shirt.

=== 1991–1992: Soul, Glitter & Sin ===
In early 1991, the band entered Rockfield Studios with the record producer, John Leckie to record Soul, Glitter & Sin. Shortly after, a "dry mix" of one of the album's tracks, "Coast To Coast", was produced by Jimmy Miller, and brass was added courtesy of The Rolling Stones' collaborators The Kickhorns. Melody Maker stated "A return to the incendiary burnouts of earlier singles, but with a new lip-curling twist. An Elmer Bernstein- type sax honks all over the cinematic grooves of the heavy soundtrack atmosphere. The psychedelic overtures of their last opus have been replaced by pure sex." and a month later "...a sleazy, swaggering, soulful, absurdly and gloriously self-conscious trash blues thing..."

Thee Hypnotics continued to tour extensively throughout the UK, Europe and the US, and were main support to The Black Crowes on their UK tour, highlights included playing two nights at the Hammersmith Odeon (18 and 19 October 1991). Ian Astbury of The Cult asked Thee Hypnotics to join The Cult on their Ceremonial Stomp tour of Europe. A sell out headline tour of the US completed the year.

=== 1993–1994: The Very Crystal Speed Machine ===
Johnny Depp, Harry Dean Stanton and Cher attended Thee Hypnotics concert at The Viper Room. However, exhausted with the gruelling schedule and lifestyle, bassist of six years Will Pepper decided to leave the band. Craig Pike was brought in to fill the vacant position. The band headed back to London and began work on new demos, but tragedy struck with Pike's untimely death from a drug overdose. With an offer to record a fourth album for the American Records label, Pepper returned on bass and the band located to Los Angeles to record their third and final studio album, The Very Crystal Speed Machine (1994), which was produced by Chris Robinson. The album was intended to be part of a handover transition of the band from Beggars Banquet to American Recordings, but due to financial issues with the label the album did not receive sufficient publicity or distribution and sales were poor. A supporting US club tour saw the band play the Viper Room and CBGB.

=== 1995–1999 ===
On return to the UK, Thee Hypnotics continued to perform and tour. A final studio release "Earth Blues 99" / "Thing 4 U" (1997) was recorded at Toe Rag Studios with Liam Watson producing and at Rocket Recordings in Bristol. With the band's momentum drained, they split up in 1999.

== Influences ==
Their music was mostly influenced by late 1960s blues-influenced hard rock bands such as The Stooges, MC5, The Doors, The Rolling Stones, Blue Cheer, Led Zeppelin, The Jimi Hendrix Experience, and the New York Dolls; and incorporated an eclectic mix of blues, soul and rock and roll.

== Post Thee Hypnotics ==
After the break-up of Thee Hypnotics, co-founder and lead guitarist Ray Hanson was approached by The Sisters of Mercy to join on guitar duties but declined, before taking a 15-year hiatus from the music industry. He wrote many of songs for his new project, "Ray 'Sonic' Hanson's Whores Of Babylon", which he debuted at Portobello Live Festival in London in May 2015. He continues to write and record music and is working on a visual arts short film. Craig Pike died from a drug overdose sometime in the mid-1990s, as written in Screaming Trees frontman Mark Lanegan memoir "Sing Backwards and Weep". Will Pepper recorded and toured with Hurricane #1. Thee Hypnotics former vocalist, Jim Jones, later fronted both Black Moses and The Jim Jones Revue. A self-titled debut album was released in 2008. After three more releases, he formed a new outfit, Jim Jones and The Righteous Mind, in October 2015. Phil Smith/Staines pursued a career as a videographer and teacher, until 2018, before he moved back to Canada

== Discography ==
=== Albums ===
- Live'r Than God : Live album (UK Situation Two, Sub Pop), 1989
- Come Down Heavy (Beggars Banquet/RCA/UK Situation Two), 1990. Remastered and rereleased with extras (Cherry Red 2011)
- Soul, Glitter & Sin (Beggars Banquet/RCA/UK Situation Two) 1991. Remastered. Online with extras (Cherry Red 2011)
- The Very Crystal Speed Machine (American Recordings/SPV), 1994

=== Singles ===
- "Love In A Different Vein" b/w "All Night Long" : 7" single (Vinyl Solution), 1987
- "Justice In Freedom" 12" b/w "Preachin' & Ramblin'" / "Choose My Own Way" (Situation Two, Beggars Banquet), 1988
- "Soul Trader" 12" b/w "Rock Me Baby" (live) / "Earth Blues" (Situation Two, Beggars Banquet), 1989 UK No. 159
- "Floating In My Hoodoo Dream" 12" b/w "Samedis'Cookbook" (Hoodoo Reprise) (Situation Two, Beggars Banquet), 1989
- "Half Man, Half Boy" 12" b/w "9 Times" / "Testimonial" (Situation Two, Beggars Banquet), 1990 UK No. 126
- "Coast To Coast" 12" b/w "Soul Accelerator" / "Shakedown" (Situation Two), 1991 UK No. 118
- "Shakedown" 12" b/w "Don't Let It Get You Down" (Beggars Banquet/RCA/UK Situation Two), 1991
- "Heavy Liquid" b/w "Heavy Liquid" (radio edit) from The Very Crystal Speed Machine, 1993
- "Earth Blues 99 b/w "Thing 4 U", Rocket Recordings, 1997

=== Other releases ===
- "The Girls All Mine" (on Motor City Madness, compilation/Stooges tribute album)
- "Can You See Me" (on If 6 Was 9, Jimi Hendrix tribute album)
