= List of Scottish musicians =

This list of notable Scottish musicians is part of the List of Scots series.

== 0–9 ==
- 18 Wheeler, band
- 1990s, indie rock band

== A ==
- John Abell, countertenor, composer and lutenist
- Aberfeldy, pop band
- AC Acoustics
- Maggie Adamson
- Stuart Adamson, Tattoo, The Skids, Big Country, and The Raphaels
- Admiral Fallow, indie folk band
- Adopted as Holograph, band
- Adventures in Stereo, band
- Aereogramme, rock band
- Aerial, power-pop band
- Pete Agnew, bassist and backing vocalist for Nazareth
- Akala rapper, Scottish mother
- Alestorm, pirate metal band
- Albannach, band
- John Alford
- The Aliens, offshoot of the Beta Band
- Charlie Allan, bandleader of Saor Patrol
- James Allan, lead singer with Glasvegas
- JD Allan, former member of The Blimp
- Dot Allison, singer and songwriter, electronic music; former lead singer with band One Dove in the early 1990s
- The Almighty
- Altered Images
- Alyth, singer
- Mohsen Amini, concertinist. Co-founder and member of the folk trio Talisk and the folk band Ímar
- The Amorettes, hard rock band
- Amplifico, indie band
- Amy Belle
- Ian Anderson, singer, flautist, songwriter, and guitarist Jethro Tull
- Miller Anderson, guitarist who played at Woodstock as a member of The Keef Hartley Band
- Moira Anderson, singer
- Tom Anderson (1910–1991), fiddler and composer
- Chris Andreucci, country music singer/songwriter
- Aneka (aka Mary Sandeman), singer, Japanese Boy
- Billie Anthony (1932–1991), singer
- APB, band
- The Apples, indie-dance band
- Arab Strap, Indie band
- Craig Armstrong, composer
- Anna Arnott (1887–1978)
- Associates, duo
- Astrid, band
- Attic Lights, indie rock band
- Average White Band, funk rock brass band
- Jean Aylwin (1885–1964)
- Aztec Camera, band

== B ==
- Howie B, musician, producer and DJ
- Back of the Moon
- Lady Grizel Baillie (1665–1746), songwriter
- Aly Bain, fiddler
- Jimmy Bain, bassist associated with Thin Lizzy, Rainbow and Dio
- Ian Bairnson, guitarist of Pilot and The Alan Parsons Project
- Balaam and the Angel, rock band
- Ballboy, indie band
- A Band Called Quinn
- Band of the Royal Regiment of Scotland, official regimental military band
- Jimmy Barnes
- Barry Can't Swim musician and Producer
- The Bathers, band
- Battlefield Band
- Malcolm Baxter, singer/songwriter, fronted punk band Last Words
- Bay City Rollers, 1970s pop-rock sensations
- Morag Beaton (1926–2010), dramatic soprano
- The Beatstalkers
- Callum Beattie, singer songwriter
- Jim Beattie, founding member of Primal Scream, Spirea X and Adventures in Stereo
- Callum Beaumont, bagpipe player
- Beggars Opera, rock
- Maggie Bell, rock and blues-rock singer
- Paddie Bell (1931–2005), Scottish folk singer and musician
- Robert Bell, musician The Blue Nile
- Belle & Sebastian, band
- Nicola Benedetti, violinist
- Martyn Bennett (1971–2005), Great Highland Bagpipes, Scottish smallpipes, violin, piano
- Berlin Blondes
- Guy Berryman, bass player in the band Coldplay
- Zoë Bestel, singer-songwriter
- The Beta Band, folktronica
- Shannon Bex, member of the group Danity Kane
- Biff Bang Pow!, Alan McGee's band
- Biffy Clyro, band
- Big Country, band
- The Big Dish, band
- Bilbo, band
- Billy Liar, acoustic punk/folk band
- The Birthday Suit, indie rock band
- Bis, band
- Cora Bissett
- Norman Blake, Teenage Fanclub
- Blazin' Fiddles, folk
- Bleed from Within, deathcore band
- The Blimp, rock band
- The Blow Monkeys
- Blue, band
- The Blue Nile, band
- The Bluebells, band
- BMX Bandits, twee/jangle-popfolktronica
- Boards of Canada, downtempo/electronica group
- Bodega, band
- Sega Bodega, Music Producer and Singer
- Boghall and Bathgate Caledonia Pipe Band
- Eric Bogle, folk singer/songwriter
- Bombay Talkie, Bhangra band
- Bongshang, folktronica
- Boots for Dancing, post-punk band
- Christopher Bowes, vocalist/keytarist for Alestorm
- Box Codax, band
- Billy Boyd, singer with Beecake
- Susan Boyle, singer
- Stuart Braithwaite, guitarist of Mogwai
- Breabach, folk music band
- Billy Bremner, guitarist
- Bishop Briggs, singer
- Broken Records, indie folk band
- Steve Bronski, singer-songwriter, member of Bronski Beat
- Sandy Brown (1929–75), jazz clarinettist
- Scott Brown, DJ and music producer
- Ronnie Browne, "The Voice", founding member of The Corries
- Jack Bruce (1943–2014), bassist with Cream
- Wattie Buchan, lead vocalist for The Exploited
- Isobel Buchanan, operatic soprano
- Margo Buchanan, singer-songwriter, composer, musician, and recording artist
- Paul Buchanan, singer and musician, The Blue Nile
- Charlie Burchill, guitarist of Simple Minds
- John Davie Burgess (1934–2005), bagpiper
- Yvie Burnett, mezzo-soprano singer and vocal coach
- Barry Burns
- Cha Burns (1957–2007), guitarist for The Silencers
- Butcher Boy, indie pop band
- Jenn Butterworth, acoustic folk guitarist and singer
- David Byrne (born 1952)

== C ==
- Cado Belle, band
- Café Jacques, progressive rock band
- Calamateur, singer, songwriter, musician
- Camera Obscura, band
- Isla Cameron (c.1930–1980)
- Darius Campbell Danesh (1980–2022), singer-songwriter
- Grant Campbell, singer/songwriter
- Isobel Campbell, singer formerly of Belle & Sebastian
- Jon Campbell, singer, producer, keyboard player, songwriter, and frontman of the band The Time Frequency
- Junior Campbell, founding member, lead guitarist, piano player, and singer with the band Marmalade
- Kenna Campbell, Scottish singer, teacher, tradition bearer and advocate for Gaelic language, culture and song.
- Mairi Campbell, singer, composer, violinist, fiddler
- Tracyanne Campbell, singer of band Camera Obscura
- Cannon, instrumental post-rock band
- Lewis Capaldi, singer-songwriter
- Capercaillie, folk band
- Captain Face, rock band
- Sally Carr, lead singer of Middle of the Road
- Cartoone, band
- Nicola Cassells, soprano
- The Cateran, rock band
- The Cathode Ray, alternative band
- Ceilidh Minogue, ceilidh band
- Celtic Thunder, band
- Brìghde Chaimbeul, bagpipe player
- The Chimes, dance music trio
- Colin Chisholm, lead singer of Bilbo
- Duncan Chisholm, fiddle player, founder member of Wolfstone
- George Chisholm, jazz trombonist
- Chvrches, alternative electronic band
- Cinder, singer, musician and record producer
- Cindytalk band formed by members of The Freeze now a solo project for Gordon Sharp
- The Cinematics, alternative rock band
- Gerry Cinnamon, singer-songwriter
- Clann An Drumma, tribal band
- Gary Clark, musician, songwriter and record producer
- Bryan Clarke, Napalm Stars, punk rock band
- Zal Cleminson, guitarist
- Philip Clemo, composer, musician, record producer, sound artist
- Close Lobsters, band
- Clouds, 1966–71, forerunners of progressive rock
- The Clouds, 1980s indie band
- The Clutha, traditional Scottish band
- Cocteau Twins, band
- Codeine Velvet Club, alternative rock band
- Coast, band
- Richard Colburn, drummer
- Edwyn Collins, musician, producer and record label owner
- David Conn, keyboard player with Nothing Yet
- Chris Connelly, musician and singer/songwriter
- Billy Connolly, comedian and singer, scored a UK No. 1
- Brian Connolly, vocalist with Sweet
- Conquering Animal Sound
- Iain Cook, musician, composer, record producer. A member of the band Chvrches. He played guitar for Aereogramme, and was a member of The Unwinding Hours.
- Mick Cooke, musician and composer
- Gawain Erland Cooper, folk guitarist and singer with Erland and the Carnival
- Jimmy Cooper, hammered dulcimer player
- The Cooperation Band, brass band
- Alex Cornish, singer/songwriter
- Correcto, rock supergroup
- The Corries, band
- Cosmic Rough Riders, band
- Lorne Cousin, bagpipe player
- James Crabb, classical accordionist
- Gordon Cree, singer, pianist, organist, arranger, orchestrator, conductor and composer
- Stuart Crichton, Songwriter/Producer
- Croft No. 5, world music–Celtic fusion band
- Charlotte Gordon Cumming, singer/songwriter and music producer
- The Cundeez, punk rock band
- Johnny Cunningham (1957–2003), fiddle player
- Phil Cunningham, accordionist
- Justin Currie (born 1964), singer, songwriter and bassist with Del Amitri
- Ian Cussick, singer/songwriter
- Ivor Cutler (1923–2006), singer, songwriter and humorist

== D ==
- Dàimh, folk band
- Glen Daly (c.1930–1987)
- Dananananaykroyd, band
- Darius Danesh (born 1980), singer, songwriter, and guitarist
- Danny Wilson, band
- Stuart David
- Les Davidson, guitarist
- Dawn of the Replicants, indie rock quintet
- Clarita de Quiroz (born 1984), Grade 8 pianist, Grade 8 percussionist, singer, songwriter and model
- De Rosa, rock band
- Deacon Blue, band
- Dead or American, alternative rock band
- Degrassi, band
- Del Amitri, band
- The Delgados, band
- Jackie Dennis
- Denny and Dunipace Pipe Band, Grade 3B pipe band
- Karl Denver (1931–98), singer
- Desalvo, metalcore band
- Jimmy Deuchar (1930–93), jazz trumpeter
- Sydney Devine (1940–2021)
- Jim Dewar (1942–2002), vocalist and bassist with Robin Trower Band and Stone The Crows
- Jim Diamond
- Murray Dickie (1924–1995), tenor opera singer
- Barbara Dickson, singer
- John Disco, record producer, sound engineer and songwriter, member of the band Bis
- Django Django
- Dogs Die in Hot Cars, band
- Donaldson, Moir and Paterson, rock group
- Lonnie Donegan, skiffle musician
- Donovan (born 1946)
- Daniel Dow, traditional Scottish musician and composer
- Patrick Doyle, composer
- The Dreaming, Celtic rock
- Kris Drever
- Ivan Drever, folk singer, songwriter and guitarist
- Drinking Electricity, post-punk/synthpop trio
- Drive-By Argument, band
- Bill Drummond (born 1953), singer/songwriter, Big in Japan guitarist, Zoo Records founder, The Justified Ancients of Mu Mu/The Timelords/The KLF/2K frontman, K Foundation artist, writer
- Drums of Death, electronic musician
- Graeme Duffin, lead guitarist for Wet Wet Wet
- Irvin Duguid, session musician/composer
- Charles Davidson Dunbar, DCM (1870–1939), first pipe major in Britain and the Empire to be commissioned as a pipe officer
- Amy Duncan, singer/songwriter and multi-instrumentalist
- C Duncan, composer and musician
- Gordon Duncan (1964–2005), bagpiper and composer
- Malcolm "Molly" Duncan (1945–2019), tenor saxophonist formerly with Mogul Thrash, founding member of Average White Band
- Andy Dunlop, lead guitarist of Travis
- Joy Dunlop, Gaelic singer
- Sophia Dussek (1775–1831), singer, pianist, harpist, and composer
- Alex Duthart (1925–1986), drummer
- The Dykeenies, indie rock band
- Dysart and Dundonald Pipe Band

== E ==
- Eagleowl, post-folk band
- The Eastern Swell, psychedelic folk band
- Carla J. Easton
- Sheena Easton (born 1959)
- Craig Eddie, singer
- Joe Egan, singer with Stealers Wheel
- Egebamyasi, house artist from Inverness
- The Electrics, Celtic rock band
- Richard Elliot, saxophonist
- El Mafrex, Urban Contemporary Gospel
- El Presidente, band
- Robert Emery (1794–1871), songwriter
- Emma's Imagination, singer
- Natasha England, pop singer
- Marcus Eoin (born 1970), electronic musician, Boards of Canada
- Errors, post-electro band
- Eugenius, founded by Eugene Kelly, formerly known as Captain America
- Nathan Evans
- Ex-Simple Minds, New Wave/rock band
- The Exploited, punk band

== F ==
- Fairground Attraction
- Al Fairweather
- Kyle Falconer, lead singer of The View
- Fatherson
- Fiction Factory, new wave band
- Fiddlers' Bid, instrumental group
- Findo Gask, band
- The Fire Engines
- Fish (born 1958), singer
- Archie Fisher, folk singer and songwriter
- Ray Fisher (1940–2011), folk singer
- Scott Fitzgerald
- Dave Flett, guitarist Manfred Mann's Earth Band
- Kat Flint, singer/songwriter
- The Flowers, post-punk band
- Flying Squad, Scottish band featuring Fin Muir, Monty McMonagle, George Crossan, Alex Calder and Jimmy Kelly. Signed to CBS/Epic records.
- Derek Forbes, bassist, vocalist, and sometime guitarist
- Dean Ford (1945–2018), singer and songwriter Marmalade
- Jessie Fordyce (1905–2003), "harmony" part trio harmony singer with the Three X Sisters. She was born (1905) in Scotland. Raised primarily in Brooklyn, NY USA.
- Forever More, band
- FOUND, experimental pop band and arts collective
- Julie Fowlis, singer and multi-instrumentalist
- Foxface, band
- Roddy Frame, songwriter with Aztec Camera
- Fran and Anna
- Franz Ferdinand, band
- Alasdair Fraser, fiddler
- Elizabeth Fraser, vocalist with Cocteau Twins
- The Fratellis, band
- The Freeze, post-punk band from Linlithgow 1976–1981
- Alan Frew, vocalist with Glass Tiger
- Friends Again
- Frightened Rabbit
- The Fuse
- Future Pilot A.K.A.
- Futuristic Retro Champions
- Iona Fyfe, folk singer
- Will Fyffe (1885–1947)

== G ==
- Paul Galbraith, classical guitarist
- Benny Gallagher, singer-songwriter and multi-instrumentalist, half of Gallagher and Lyle
- Gallagher and Lyle
- Ganger, Glasgow alt rock band
- Mary Garden (1874–1967), operatic soprano
- Alex Gardner, pop singer
- Willie Gardner
- Ricky Gardiner, guitarist and composer for David Bowie and Iggy Pop
- Dick Gaughan, traditional and political folk singer and songwriter
- gay against you, electronic music duo
- Geneva, Aberdeen alt rock band
- GED AND THE WAKE, (band), (Ged Johnston) Born in Edinburgh
- John Giblin
- Sir Alexander Drummond Gibson (1926–1995), conductor and opera intendant
- Dave Gibson, singer/songwriter
- Robert Gilfillan (1798–1850), poet and songwriter
- Bobby Gillespie, singer with Primal Scream
- Anne Lorne Gillies
- JJ Gilmour, singer songwriter, formerly of The Silencers
- Glasgow Police Pipe Band, grade one pipe band
- Glasvegas
- Chris Glen, bassist, The Sensational Alex Harvey Band, Michael Schenker Group
- Hamish Glencross, guitarist for My Dying Bride
- Evelyn Glennie (born 1965), percussionist
- The Golden Dawn
- Goodbye Mr Mackenzie, band; formed a side-project named Angelfish with member Shirley Manson on vocals
- Nathaniel Gow (1763–1831), son of Niel Gow, performer, composer and arranger of tunes, songs and other pieces
- Niel Gow (1727–1807), the Perthshire Fiddler
- Eve Graham, singer with The New Seekers
- Isla Grant
- James Grant, singer/songwriter
- Jack Green
- Katie Gregson-MacLeod
- Stan Greig (1930–2012), jazz pianist, drummer, and bandleader
- Ged Grimes, bass player for Simple Minds
- Clare Grogan, singer with Altered Images
- The Groovy Little Numbers, band
- Gun, band
- Robin Guthrie, founder of Cocteau Twins
- The Gyres, band

== H ==
- H_{2}O, band
- Paul Haig, singer and co founder of Josef K
- Rachel Hair, folk harpist
- Robin Hall, folk singer
- Ainsley Hamill, singer-songwriter
- Jo Hamilton, vocalist, composer and multi-instrumentalist
- Susan Hamilton, soprano
- Ian Hampton, bassist for Sparks
- The Happy Family, post punk band
- Harem Scarem, folk band
- Calvin Harris, electronic musician
- Roddy Hart, singer/songwriter in The Lonesome Fire
- Alex Harvey (1935–1982), blues and rock musician in The Sensational Alex Harvey Band
- Leslie Harvey (1944–1972), guitarist
- Jimmy Hastings
- Pye Hastings, guitarist and vocalist for Caravan
- Hamish Hawk
- Colin Hay (born 1953), singer with Men at Work
- The Hazey Janes
- The Headboys, power pop band
- Fran Healy, singer in band Travis
- Hector Bizerk, experimental hip-hop group
- The Hedrons
- Heisk, folk band
- Helicopter Girl
- Ainslie Henderson, singer/songwriter
- Ewen Henderson, multi-instrumentalist folk musician
- Marie Therese Henderson, music director and composer
- Mike Heron, singer, songwriter and multi-instrumentalist
- Corrina Hewat, harpist and composer
- Lou Hickey
- Hiding Place, rock band
- Lizzie Higgins (1929–1993), ballad singer
- Hip Parade, band
- Hipsway, band
- Greg Holden, singer- songwriter
- Holocaust, heavy metal band
- Honeyblood, band
- Horse, singer-songwriter
- How to Swim, pop/rock band
- Andrew Howie, singer/songwriter, producer and music tutor
- RM Hubbert, guitarist and singer
- Hudson Mohawke, producer, DJ and composer
- Hue & Cry, band
- Alistair Hulett (1951–2010), acoustic guitar and vocals, Roaring Jack
- The Humblebums
- John Law Hume (1890–1912), violinist on the RMS Titanic
- Willie Hunter (1933–1994), folk fiddler
- The Hurricanes, rhythm & blues group
- Scott Hutchison (1981–2018), singer, songwriter, guitarist. Founding member of Frightened Rabbit
- Kenny Hyslop, drummer

== I ==
- Idlewild
- Ili, singer-songwriter
- Illyus & Barrientos, electronic music duo
- Ímar, folk band
- Hamish Imlach, folk singer
- The Incredible String Band
- Andrew Innes, guitarist in Primal Scream
- Gary Innes, Traditional and Folk
- Inveraray & District Pipe Band, Grade 1 pipe band
- Iron Claw, band
- The Iron Horse, Celtic music band
- Iron Virgin, glam rock band
- Craig Irving

== J ==
- Leon Jackson, winner of the fourth series of The X Factor
- Milton Jackson, DJ, record producer
- Stevie Jackson
- Jacob Yates and the Pearly Gate Lock Pickers, band
- Jackie James, singer/songwriter and keyboard player
- Bert Jansch
- The Jasmine Minks, band from Aberdeen, early Creation Records signing
- Jazzateers, pop/post-punk group
- Ben Jelen (born 1979), singer/songwriter, musician
- Jesse Garon and the Desperadoes, band
- The Jesus and Mary Chain, band
- Jo Mango, alternative folk and acoustic band
- Richard Jobson, lead singer of The Skids, The Armoury Show
- Joesef, singer
- Davey Johnstone, rock guitarist and vocalist (born in Edinburgh), best known for his work with Elton John, Alice Cooper, and Meat Loaf
- Duncan Johnstone (1925–1999), bagpiper and composer
- Ged Johnston (GED AND THE WAKE) Lead Singer, Rock Guitarist. And Known For Many Top Collaborations
- Jonny, two-person band
- Josef K, band
- Kathryn Joseph, singer/songwriter
- Ruarri Joseph, singer/songwriter
- Jackie Joyce, also known as Helicopter Girl
- JSD Band, Celtic and folk rock band
- The Just Joans, indie pop band

== K ==
- Kaddish, band
- Ramsey Kanaan, singer
- Pat Kane, lead singer of Hue and Cry
- Richard Kass, session drummer
- Kassidy, band
- The Kazoo Funk Orchestra, band
- Johnny Keating
- David Keenan
- Brian Kellock, jazz pianist
- Eugene Kelly, founding member of The Vaselines and Eugenius
- Calum Kennedy (1928–2006), singer
- David Kennedy (1825–1886), church musician and concert giver
- Mary Ann Kennedy, singer
- Marjory Kennedy-Fraser (1857–1930), singer, composer and arranger
- Ally Kerr, singer/songwriter
- Jim Kerr (born 1959), singer and founding member of Simple Minds
- Keser, band
- Mary Kiani, singer
- Kid Canaveral, band
- Carol Kidd, jazz singer
- Jim Kilpatrick, pipe band drummer
- Sandy Kilpatrick, singer/songwriter
- Alan King, lead singer of the rock band Walk on Fire
- King Creosote, singer/songwriter
- King King, band
- Niki King, jazz and soul-funk singer/songwriter
- Alison Kinnaird, harpist
- Kinnaris Quintet
- Kloe, singer-songwriter
- David Knopfler, co-founder of the rock band Dire Straits
- Mark Knopfler (born 1949), guitarist, Dire Straits frontman
- Kode9, electronic musician
- Konx-Om-Pax, electronic musician

== L ==
- Ally Laing, songwriter
- Griogair Labhruidh, Scottish Gaelic poet, musician, and hip-hop producer/MC
- The LaFontaines, band
- La Paz
- Hannah Laing, disc jockey and record producer from Dundee
- Chris Lake, house musician, mau5trap
- Frederic Lamond (1868–1948), classical pianist, second-to-last surviving pupil of Franz Liszt
- Land, Christian music band
- The Last Battle, indie alt-pop band
- Lau, folk band featuring Kris Drever
- Harry Lauder (1870–1950), music hall singer
- The Law
- William Lawrie (1881–1916), bagpiper and composer
- Mary Lee (1921–2022), singer
- Storm Lee
- Durward Lely (1855–1944), opera singer
- Lemonescent, girl group
- Annie Lennox, singer, formerly in the Eurythmics
- Jackie Leven, folk musician
- Stuart Liddell, bagpiper
- Life Without Buildings
- Alex Ligertwood, formerly vocalist with Santana
- Rona Lightfoot (born 1936), piper and singer
- Linus Loves, dance music remixer/producer
- Little Eye
- Little Fire, singer/songwriter
- Gav Livz
- Lloyd Cole and the Commotions
- Jaz Lochrie, bass guitarist with Bad Company
- Cecilia Loftus (1876–1943)
- Logan, rock band
- Craig Logan, former bassist of the pop band Bros
- Ella Logan (1913–1969), singer
- Loki, rapper
- Lone Pigeon
- Long Fin Killie (1993–1998)
- Alan Longmuir (1948–2018), bass guitarist, a founding member of the Bay City Rollers
- Looper
- Lord Cut-Glass
- Roddy Lorimer, musician who plays trumpet and flugelhorn
- Love and Money
- Gerard Love, Teenage Fanclub
- Lulu (born 1948)
- Lungleg, indie band
- The Luvvers, rock group
- Billy Lyall (1953–1989)
- Graham Lyle, singer-songwriter, guitarist and producer, half of Gallagher and Lyle
- Lyn-Z, bass guitarist of Mindless Self Indulgence
- Yvonne Lyon

== M ==
- Hector MacAndrew (1903–1980), fiddler
- Ishbel MacAskill (1941–2011), Scottish Gaelic singer and teacher
- Jimmy MacBeath (1894–1972), singer
- Lauren MacColl, fiddler
- Donald Ban MacCrimmon (d. 1746), bagpiper
- Red Donald MacCrimmon (d. 1825), bagpiper
- Black John MacCrimmon (d. 1822), bagpiper
- Hamish MacCunn (1868–1916), composer, conductor and teacher
- Amy MacDonald, singer
- The MacDonald Brothers
- Calum MacDonald, percussionist of the band Runrig
- Catriona MacDonald, fiddler and teacher
- Finlay MacDonald (born 1978), bagpiper and composer
- Roddy MacDonald (born 1956), pipe major, bagpiper and composer
- Rory Macdonald, bassist of the band Runrig
- Sydney MacEwan, singer (1908–1991)
- Bruce MacGregor, fiddler and broadcaster
- Jimmy MacGregor, folk singer
- Kathleen MacInnes, singer
- Maggie MacInnes, folk singer and clàrsach player
- Colin MacIntyre, also known as Mull Historical Society
- Angus MacKay (1813–1859), bagpipe player
- Graeme Mackay, accordion composer and player
- Jim Mackay (1939–2022) accordion composer and player
- Mike Mackay, acordion composer and player, drummer
- Tom Mackay (1960–2021) Scottish folk drummer
- Alexander Mackenzie (1847–1935), composer, conductor and teacher
- Billy Mackenzie, singer
- Fiona J. Mackenzie, Gaelic singer
- Talitha MacKenzie
- The Mackenzies, indie band
- Maeve Mackinnon, folk singer
- Dave Mackintosh, DragonForce drummer
- Robert Mackintosh (c. 1745–1807), violinist and composer
- Jessie MacLachlan (1866–1916), Gaelic soprano
- Dougie MacLean (born 1954), contemporary folk songwriter
- Mary Macmaster, harpist and singer
- Flora MacNeil (1928–2015), Gaelic singer
- Catherine MacLeod (1914–2000), Gaelic singer and school teacher
- Donald MacLeod (1917–1982), bagpiper
- Jim MacLeod (1928–2004), bandleader, musician and broadcaster
- Roddy MacLeod (born 1962), bagpiper, principal of the National Piping Centre
- James MacMillan, contemporary classical composer
- Catherine-Ann MacPhee, Gaelic singer
- Mac-Talla, Scottish Gaelic "supergroup"
- Dan McCafferty (1946–2022), singer of Nazareth (band)
- The Magnificents, electro rock band
- Alan Mair, bassist from The Only Ones
- Make Model, band
- Steven Malcolmson, songwriter, record producer
- Malinky, folk band
- Jo Mango, alternative folk and acoustic band
- Mànran, band
- Shirley Manson (born 1966), singer/songwriter, Garbage frontwoman, formerly of Goodbye Mr Mackenzie and Angelfish
- Kelly Marie, singer
- Marmaduke Duke
- Marmalade, pop/rock band and first Scottish group to ever top the UK chart
- Helen Marnie, lead singer of Ladytron
- Michael Marra (1952–2012), singer/songwriter and musician
- Lena Martell, singer
- The Martians, rock band
- Bill Martin
- Sarah Martin
- Malcolm Martineau (born 1960), pianist
- John Martyn (1948–2009), folk/rock/jazz singer and guitarist
- Sonny J Mason, singer, songwriter, and producer, also known as Justin Osuji
- Steve Mason
- Hans Matheson
- Karen Matheson, lead singer of Capercaillie
- Muir Mathieson (1911–75), conductor and composer
- Lauren Mayberry, lead singer of Chvrches
- MC-VA, rapper, record producer, songwriter and entrepreneur
- Dan McCafferty, lead singer of Nazareth
- The McCalmans
- Willie McCallum, bagpipe player
- Angela McCluskey (1960–2024), lead singer in Wild Colonials
- Alyth McCormack, singer
- Stevie McCrorie, singer-songwriter, won the fourth series of The Voice UK in 2015
- Gordeanna McCulloch (1946–2019), folksong and ballad singer with The Clutha
- Jimmy McCulloch (1953–1979), musician with Paul McCartney and Wings; former member of One in a Million, Thunderclap Newman and Stone the Crows
- Kevin McDermott, singer/songwriter
- Terry McDermott, rock singer with Driveblind
- Alastair McDonald (musician)
- Horse McDonald, singer-songwriter
- Nicholas McDonald, singer
- Shelagh McDonald
- Rose McDowall, vocalist, most notably of Strawberry Switchblade and Sorrow
- Jai McDowall
- Johnny McElhone, founding member of Altered Images, Hipsway and Texas
- Alan McGee, founder of Creation Records; former member of The Revolving Paint Dream and Biff Bang Pow!
- John McGeoch (1955–2004)
- Gerry McGhee, singer in the band Brighton Rock
- Gwendolen McGill (born 1910), Scottish musician, composer and music teacher
- Raymond McGinley, Teenage Fanclub
- Matt McGinn (1928–1977)
- Kerry McGregor (1974–2012)
- Lorraine McIntosh, singer with Deacon Blue
- Catriona McKay, harpist and composer
- Kevin McKay, DJ, electronic musician, record label owner and record producer
- Licorice McKechnie
- Frances McKee, singer and songwriter in The Vaselines
- Kenneth McKellar, singer
- Jackie McKeown, lead singer and guitarist for The Yummy Fur and 1990s
- Murray McLachlan, concert pianist
- Morag McLaren, soprano singer of opera, musicals and cabaret
- Marie McLaughlin
- Ewan McLennan, folk musician and singer-songwriter
- G. S. McLennan (1883–1929), bagpipe player
- Michelle McManus, Pop Idol winner
- Tony McManus, steel-string guitarist
- Andy McMaster, bass, keyboards, vocals, songwriter for The Motors (1977–1980)
- Colin McMaster (1960–1990), lead singer for Heart Industry and The Steel Chain
- Brian McNeill, a founding member of the Battlefield Band
- Meat Whiplash
- Mendeed, Glaswegian metal band
- Mercury Tilt Switch, rock band
- Martin Metcalfe, founder Goodbye Mr Mackenzie (band) and The Filthy Tongues (band)
- Meursault, indie folk band from Edinburgh
- Middle of the Road, pop group
- Malcolm Middleton
- Frankie Miller, blues/rock singer, guitarist and songwriter
- Siobhan Miller, folk singer
- Lisa Milne, soprano
- Peter Milne (1824–1908), violinist and composer
- Miniature Dinosaurs, pop/rock band
- Miss le Bomb
- George Mitchell (1917–2002), creator of The Black and White Minstrel Show
- Aidan Moffat
- Mogwai, post-rock band
- Hudson Mohawke, electronic music producer/DJ
- Momus
- Andrew Montgomery, singer
- Shona Mooney, fiddle player
- Hamish Moore, maker and player of Scottish smallpipes
- PJ Moore, singer and musician The Blue Nile
- Roderick Morison, Gaelic poet and harpist
- Fred Morrison (born 1963), bagpiper and composer
- Iain Morrison, musician and singer/songwriter
- Euan Morton, Broadway actor, singer, voice artist
- Tom Morton, broadcaster and musician
- Mother and the Addicts
- The Motorcycle Boy, indie pop band
- Paul Mounsey
- Mouth Music
- Mr Egg (born 1959), formerly known as James McDonald, singer/songwriter, Egebamyasi, progenitor of acid house music
- Jim Mullen, jazz guitarist
- Mungo's Hi Fi
- Donnie Munro, former lead singer of Runrig
- Stuart Murdoch (born 1968), singer/songwriter, Belle & Sebastian frontman
- Neil Murray, bass player, best known for his work in Whitesnake, The Brian May Band and Black Sabbath
- My Latest Novel, melodic indie pop band
- Mylo, DJ

== N ==
- Na Gathan, indie rock band
- Nalle, psychedelic folk trio
- Findlay Napier
- Peter Nardone, countertenor, organist, choirmaster and composer
- National Park, band
- Natural Acoustic Band, acid-folk band
- Nazareth, band
- The Nectarine No. 9, indie band
- The Needles, band
- Simon Neil, lead singer and guitarist with Biffy Clyro
- Nina Nesbitt, singer/songwriter
- New Celeste, folk rock band
- Rachel Newton, singer and harpist
- Nicolette, singer/songwriter
- Maggie Nicols
- Nightcrawlers, band with DJ and producer John Reid
- Niteworks, electronic Celtic fusion band
- No Way Sis, band
- Rab Noakes, singer, songwriter and producer
- North Atlantic Oscillation
- Paolo Nutini, singer/songwriter
- Nyah Fearties, band

== O ==
- Maeve O'Boyle, singer and songwriter
- Octopus, Britpop band
- Mike Ogletree, drummer and guitarist
- O'Hara's Playboys, pop group
- Oi Polloi, anarcho-punk band
- Old Blind Dogs, folk/blues
- One Dove
- One in a Million, psychedelic rock band
- Barrie-James O'Neill, singer and songwriter
- Jimme O'Neill, singer and guitarist, lead singer of The Silencers
- Orange Juice, Glasgow-based post-punk band
- The Orchids
- Aidan O'Rourke, contemporary folk music fiddle player and composer
- Ossian, band
- Justin Osuji, singer, songwriter, and producer, also known as Sonny J Mason
- Over The Wall
- Dean Owens
- Owl John

== P ==
- Pallas, progressive rock band
- The Pastels, band
- Alistair Iain Paterson, musician and composer
- David Paton, singer, guitarist and bassist with Pilot, The Alan Parsons Project, Camel
- Davey Pattison, lead singer of Gamma
- Paul McKenna Band, folk musical group
- Owen Paul, singer
- Dougie Payne, bassist and backing vocalist of Travis
- PAWS, alternative rock band
- Pearl and the Puppets
- Pearlfishers
- Peat and Diesel
- Peatbog Faeries
- The Phantom Band
- The Pictish Trail
- Pilot, band
- The Poets, band
- Political Asylum, punk band
- Emma Pollock, singer, songwriter, and guitarist; a founding member of The Delgados
- Karine Polwart
- The Poozies, traditional folk band
- The Porridge Men
- Positive Noise
- Frankie Poullain, bass player for The Darkness
- Ian Powrie, country dance musician and fiddle player
- Prides, indie band
- Primal Scream, band
- The Primary 5, band
- The Primevals, rock group
- Christine Primrose, Gaelic singer and music teacher
- Neil Primrose, drummer of Travis
- The Proclaimers
- Pumajaw

== Q ==
- QFX, dance group
- Finley Quaye
- Monica Queen
- The Questions, pop band
- Paul Quinn, vocalist and songwriter

== R ==
- Jesse Rae
- John Rae, drummer, band leader, composer
- Gerry Rafferty, singer/songwriter, Stealers Wheel
- Chris Rainbow (1946–2015)
- Randolp's Leap, indie pop band
- Billy Rankin, guitarist
- The Raphaels, alternative country music band
- Hannah Rarity, singer-songwriter
- Eddi Reader
- Red Hackle Pipe Band
- Red Hot Chilli Pipers
- Rick Redbeard, musician, singer and songwriter
- Jean Redpath (1937–2014), folk singer
- Alan Reid, folk multi-instrumentalist and songwriter
- Jenna Reid, fiddle player
- Johnny Reid, country singer
- Meston Reid (1945–1993), opera singer
- Neil Reid, child singing star
- Maggie Reilly, singer/songwriter
- Tommy Reilly
- The Reindeer Section
- Remember Remember, instrumental band
- Robert Rental
- The Revolving Paint Dream, Andrew Innes' first band, also featuring Alan McGee
- The Rezillos, Edinburgh nu wave punk band
- The Rich, Edinburgh indie band
- Rico
- Manda Rin, singer/songwriter with band bis
- Billy Ritchie, musician and composer of Clouds
- Ian Ritchie, saxophonist, producer and composer
- The River Detectives
- Alasdair Roberts, folk musician
- Arthur Scott Robertson (1911–2000), fiddle player
- B.A. Robertson, songwriter
- Brian Robertson, guitarist for Thin Lizzy and Motörhead
- Eric Robertson, composer
- Jeannie Robertson (1908–1975), folk singer
- Stanley Robertson (1940–2009), storyteller and ballad singer
- Harry Robertson
- Seb Rochford, drummer and bandleader, Polar Bear
- Annie Ross, jazz singer
- Malcolm Ross, guitarist
- Ricky Ross, lead singer of Deacon Blue
- Rote Kapelle, post punk/indie pop band
- Roys Iron DNA, indie band
- Runrig, Gaelic rock band
- RURA, folk band
- David Russell, classical guitarist
- Rustie
- Louise Rutkowski, singer

== S ==
- Sacred Paws, rock band
- Isla St Clair
- Saint Jude's Infirmary, indie band
- Salsa Celtica, Latin/folk fusion band
- Emeli Sandé, singer
- Mary Sandeman (aka Aneka), traditional singer, solo and with Scottish Fiddle Orchestra, Gaelic Mod gold medallist
- Michael Sandison (born 1970), electronic musician, Boards of Canada
- Saor Patrol, folk band
- Paul Savage, drummer in The Delgados
- Scars, band
- Scatter, band
- Bon Scott (1946–1980), singer for band AC/DC
- David Scott, founder and leader of The Pearlfishers
- Mike Scott (born 1958)
- Tommy Scott, songwriter, producer and singer
- Scottish Chamber Orchestra
- ScottishPower Pipe Band
- The Secret Goldfish
- Patsy Seddon, harpist, violinist, and traditional singer
- Shuna Scott Sendall, dramatic soprano opera singer
- The Sensational Alex Harvey Band
- Sergeant, band
- Rachel Sermanni
- Serpico, punk/metal band
- The Shamen
- Jimmy Shand (1908–2000)
- Gordon Sharp. singer with The Freeze and currently Cindytalk as well as a contributor to This Mortal Coil
- Donald Shaw
- Eilidh Shaw, fiddle player and singer
- Rebecca Shearing, pop singer
- The Shermans
- Shetland Fiddlers' Society, group of fiddlers
- Sean Shibe, classical and electric guitarist
- Scott Shields, film composer, musician and record producer. Best known as a member of Joe Strummer's band The Mescaleros
- Shooglenifty, Celtic fusion band
- The Shop Assistants, indie pop band
- Shotts and Dykehead Caledonia Pipe Band, grade 1 pipe band
- Derek Shulman, lead singer for Simon Dupree and the Big Sound and Gentle Giant
- SHY & DRS
- The Side, band
- Sìleas, harp duo
- The Silencers
- Silibil N' Brains, hip-hop duo
- Silly Wizard, folk group
- Simple Minds
- Habbie Simpson (1550–1620), town piper in Kilbarchan, Renfrewshire
- Tom Simpson, keyboardist for Snow Patrol
- The Singing Kettle, folk music group
- The Singing Scott Brothers
- Sister Vanilla, singer-songwriter
- Skerryvore, Celtic rock group
- Skids, band
- Grahame Skinner
- Skipinnish, traditional Scottish band
- Slam, house and techno DJs and producers
- SleepResearch_Facility
- Slik, Midge Ure's first band
- Sluts of Trust
- Emily Smith, singer
- Martin Smith (1957–1994)
- Tommy Smith, jazz saxophonist, composer, educator and bandleader (Scottish National Jazz Orchestra)
- Alex Smoke, music producer and DJ
- David Sneddon, singer/songwriter
- Snow Patrol, band formed in Dundee
- Snowblood, sludge/post-rock/doom metal band
- The Snuts, indi band
- Jimmy Somerville
- Sons and Daughters, band
- Soom T, reggae singer and rapper
- Soup Dragons, band
- Spare Snare, band
- Spirea X, Greenock psychedelic band
- Spirit of Scotland Pipe Band
- Sharleen Spiteri, singer, songwriter, guitarist and lead vocalist of Texas
- The Spook School, indie pop band
- Barry St. John (1943–2020), singer
- Stanley Odd, alternative hip-hop group
- Stapleton, rock band
- Robyn Stapleton, singer
- Mike Starrs
- Star Wheel Press
- Stealers Wheel
- Colin Steele, jazz trumpeter, composer
- Steg G
- Freddie Stevenson, singer-songwriter
- Al Stewart
- Andy Stewart (1933–1993)
- Andy M. Stewart, singer, formerly of Silly Wizard
- Belle Stewart (1906–1997), traditional singer
- Calum Stewart
- Duglas T. Stewart, leader of BMX Bandits
- Ian Stewart, keyboardist and co-founder of The Rolling Stones
- Rachel Stewart, singer and folk dancer, a founding member of Beauty School
- Sheila Stewart, Traditional singer (1937–2014)
- Stiltskin
- Stone The Crows
- Chris Stout, fiddle/violin player
- Strawberry Switchblade, band
- Stretchheads, punk band
- Hamish Stuart
- Sucioperro, rock band
- Suckle, indie pop band formed by Vaselines member Frances McKee
- The Supernaturals
- Superstar
- The Sutherland Brothers, folk and soft rock duo
- Stuart Sutcliffe (1940–1962), original bass player of The Beatles
- Katie Sutherland, vocals/guitar with Pearl and the Puppets
- Swanee, rock singer, elder brother of Jimmy Barnes
- Swimmer One, band

== T ==
- Talisk, folk band
- Malachy Tallack, singer/songwriter
- The Tannahill Weavers, folk group
- Katie Targett-Adams, singer/songwriter-MC and Celtic harpist
- John Taylor, fiddler
- Julienne Taylor, singer/songwriter
- Teenage Fanclub
- Telstar Ponies
- Joe Temperley (1929–2016), jazz saxophonist
- Ten Tonne Dozer, groove metal band
- Terra Diablo
- Texas, Rock band
- Sandi Thom
- Ali Thomson
- Chris Thomson singer/songwriter musician and founder Friends Again (band) and The Bathers (band)
- Dougie Thomson, bass player of Supertramp
- Inge Thomson, singer and multi-instrumentalist, a founding member of Harem Scarem
- Paul Thomson, drummer of Franz Ferdinand,
- William Thomson (1695–1753)
- The Little Kicks, band in Aberdeen
- The Threats, UK82 punk band from Edinburgh/Dalkeith
- Thrum, indie rock band
- Tide Lines, four-piece band
- The Time Frequency, dance group
- Tom McGuire & The Brassholes, funk soul band from Glasgow
- Torphichen and Bathgate Pipe Band
- Torridon, folk rock band
- Stuart Tosh, drummer, songwriter and vocalist
- Trashcan Sinatras
- Travis, band
- Treacherous Orchestra, 12-piece Celtic fusion band
- Trembling Bells
- Len Tuckey, musician, songwriter, composer and record producer
- KT Tunstall
- Alison Turriff, classical/folk fusion clarinettist
- The Twilight Sad
- Twin Atlantic
- Two Wings, rock band

== U ==
- Ultra-Sonic, electronic music band
- The Uncle Devil Show, pop-rock guitar band
- Uncle John & Whitelock, horror punk band
- Under the Dome, ambient music band
- Unicorn Kid, Oliver Sabin, DJ / chiptune producer
- Unkle Bob, indie rock band
- The Unwinding Hours, alternative rock band
- Midge Ure
- Urusei Yatsura, band

== V ==
- The Valves, band
- The Vaselines, band
- Ewen Vernal
- The View, band
- Peter-John Vettese, keyboardist of Jethro Tull (1982–1986)
- Dougie Vipond, TV presenter and musician Deacon Blue
- VUKOVI, rock band

== W ==
- Julian Wagstaff, contemporary classical composer
- The Wake
- Gordon Walker, bagpiper and pipe major
- Tom Walker, singer-songwriter
- Gordon Waller (singer) half of the duo Peter and Gordon
- Sheila Walsh
- Keith Warwick
- The Waterboys
- Colin Waterson, electronic musician
- Bruce Watson, member of Big Country
- Lori Watson, fiddle player and folk singer
- Anna Watt (1923–2009), singer from Fran and Anna
- Fran Watt (1922–2003), singer from Fran and Anna
- Kerri Watt, singer-songwriter and multi-instrumentalist
- We Are the Physics, indie band
- We See Lights, alternative indie pop band
- We Were Promised Jetpacks, Glasgow based indie band
- Sheena Wellington, traditional Scottish singer
- Bobby Wellins, jazz saxophonist
- Bill Wells, bassist, pianist, guitarist and composer
- Euan Wemyss, lead singer of Captain Face
- The Wendys
- Wensdy
- John Harley Weston, singer-songwriter
- Wet Wet Wet
- Nancy Whiskey (1935–2003), folk singer
- Alasdair White, folk musician
- Andy White, session drummer, famously stood in for Ringo Starr
- Doogie White
- Tam White, blues singer
- White Trash, signed to Apple Records, later changed their name to Trash
- Whiteout
- Astrid Williamson
- Duncan Williamson (1928–2007), storyteller and singer
- Robin Williamson, a founding member of The Incredible String Band
- Roy Williamson, founding member of The Corries and writer of Flower of Scotland
- Paul Wilson, bass guitarist for Snow Patrol
- Ray Wilson, lead singer in Stiltskin and in Genesis between 1996 and 1998
- Robert Wilson
- Thomas Wilson, composer
- Win, pop band
- Withered Hand, solo and band vehicle for Dan Willson of Edinburgh
- Wolfstone
- Stuart Wood, guitarist for the Bay City Rollers
- Eric Woolfson, The Alan Parsons Project's founder member, vocalist and lyricist
- Roddy Woomble
- Writing on the Wall, rock band

== X ==
- The Xcerts, band
- Sophie Xeon (1986–2021), musician, record producer, singer, songwriter, and DJ. Better known as Sophie

== Y ==
- Y'all is Fantasy Island, alternative folk band
- Yashin, post-hardcore band
- Yasmin, DJ, singer, songwriter
- James Yorkston
- Alexander Young, eldest of the Young brothers, founding member of Grapefruit
- Angus Young, lead guitarist, songwriter, and co-founder of the hard rock band AC/DC
- Young Fathers, alternative hip hop group
- George Young, musician, songwriter and co-founder of The Easybeats
- John Paul Young
- Kenneth Young, video game composer and musician
- Malcolm Young, founding member, rhythm guitarist, backing vocalist and co-songwriter for the hard rock band AC/DC
- Stevie Young, rhythm guitarist and member of AC/DC, former member of Starfighters
- The Yummy Fur, indie rock band

== Z ==
- Lena Zavaroni (1963–1999)
- The Zephyrs, indie band
- Zoey Van Goey, band
- Zones, power pop and new wave band
