= Katie Sutherland =

Katie Sutherland may refer to:

- Katie Sutherland, musician in Pearl and the Puppets
- Katie Sutherland (The Inbetweeners), a fictional character
