= UTD =

UTD may refer to:

- Togolese Union for Democracy (UTD)
- University of Texas at Dallas (or UTD)
- Uniform theory of diffraction (or UTD), in optics
- Unified Team Diving (or UTD)
- UTD (Urban Thermo Dynamics), a rap group co-founded by Yasiin Bey
- Utd or United, has many possible meanings, see United (disambiguation)

== See also ==
- Utd. State 90, the 1990 US version of the Ninety album by 808 State
- Under the Dome (disambiguation)
