= Gary Robertson =

Gary Robertson may refer to:

- Gary Robertson (author), Scottish poet and author
- Gary Robertson (cricketer) (born 1960), New Zealand cricketer
- Gary Robertson (rower) (born 1950), New Zealand rower
