= The Dome =

The Dome may refer to:

Places:

- In the UK:
  - The Dome, Edinburgh, an 1847 built Graeco-Roman style building in Edinburgh's New Town, Scotland
  - The Dome Leisure Centre, an arena and leisure centre in Doncaster, England
  - The Dome, London, an independent live music venue occupying the space of a former bathhouse built in 1884 in North London
  - Brighton Dome, an 1805 built arts venue housing three venues Brighton, England
  - Dome of Discovery, a building of the 1951 Festival of Britain, demolished on closure
  - Millennium Dome, a former Millennium exhibition venue in London, England, now redeveloped as the O2 entertainment venue
  - Plymouth Dome
- In the US:
  - The Dome (Anchorage, Alaska), multi-purpose sports arena in Anchorage, Alaska
  - The Dome Center incorporating the Dome Arena, a fair and convention complex in Henrietta, New York
  - Carrier Dome, a stadium owned by Syracuse University, Syracuse, New York
  - Louisiana Superdome, home of the New Orleans Saints American football team
  - Hubert H. Humphrey Metrodome, home of the Minnesota Vikings American football team
  - The Dome at America's Center, former home of the St. Louis Rams
- In the Marshall Islands:
  - Runit Dome, a 46 cm thick Concrete Dome over 73,000 cubic meters of radioactive debris
- Other places:
  - The Dome (Dubai), a 44 floor skyscraper in Jumeirah Lake Towers, Dubai, UAE
  - The Dome (Lima), a church in Madgalena del Mar, Lima, Peru
  - The Dome (Sydney), an indoor sports arena in the Sydney Olympic Park, Australia
  - The Dome (Swakopmund), an indoor sports arena in Swakopmund, Namibia

Other uses:

- The Dome (periodical), a British arts periodical published from 1897 to 1900
- The Dome (TV program), a German television program and music event

== See also ==
- Dome (disambiguation)
- Under the Dome (disambiguation)
