= T in the Park 2003 =

Music festival in Scotland

T in the Park
- Dates: 12–13 July 2003
- Locations: Balado, Scotland
- Years active: 1994 - present
- Website: http://tinthepark.com/

T in the Park 2003 was a music festival that took place on 12–13 July 2003 in Kinross, Scotland. It was the 10th anniversary of the festival. 55,000 people attended the concert, an increase of 5,000 from the previous year. Headlining acts were R.E.M., The Flaming Lips and Coldplay. The White Stripes had been scheduled to perform as well, but they backed out at the last minute due to Jack White breaking his finger and were covered by the Flaming Lips.

Jack McConnell attended for the first time and said, "It's great to see so many young people enjoying themselves and the festival is very valuable to both the locals and the national economy. It also offers a great opportunity to showcase the Scottish music industry and symbolizes the modern Scotland that we want to portray."

Tayside Police said there were 24 arrests for minor offences and praised the crowd for their good behaviour over the three days.

== Tickets ==
Tickets for the 2003 festival were sold out eight days before the event started. An extra 5,000 tickets were also made available as the demand was the highest since 1993.

== Line up ==
The 2003 line-up was:

=== Main Stage ===
Saturday 12 July	Sunday 13 July
R.E.M.; The Flaming Lips; Idlewild; The Cardigans; The Proclaimers; Biffy Clyro; Skin; Martin Grech; Kings of Leon	Coldplay; The Charlatans; Feeder; Supergrass; The Coral; Sugababes; Echo & the Bunnymen; The Darkness

=== BBC Radio 1/NME Stage ===
Saturday 12 July	Sunday 13 July
The Music; The Polyphonic Spree; Super Furry Animals; John Squire; The Saw Doctors; Kings of Leon; Snow Patrol; Turbonegro; The Warlocks	Underworld; The Streets; Turin Brakes; The Roots; Inspiral Carpets; The Cooper Temple Clause; Hell Is for Heroes; The Raveonettes; Longview

=== King Tut's Wah Wah Tent ===
Saturday 12 July	Sunday 13 July
Tricky; The Datsuns; Flint; The Jeevas; Mint Royale; Speedway; The Basement; The Futureheads	Teenage Fanclub; Lemon Jelly; Mull Historical Society; Death in Vegas; Appleton; Damien Rice; The Thrills; The Grim Northern Social; Alfie; Mankato

=== X Tent ===
Saturday 12 July	Sunday 13 July
The Mars Volta; The Eighties Matchbox B-Line Disaster; Athlete; InMe; Cosmic Rough Riders; The Warlocks; Har Mar Superstar; Franz Ferdinand; The Stands; The Zutons; The Rain Band	The Rapture; Tom McRae; OK Go; Ed Harcourt; Ron Sexsmith; The All-American Rejects; Kinesis; Funeral for a Friend; The Bandits; Myslovitz

=== Slam Tent ===
Saturday 12 July	Sunday 13 July
Deep Dish; Laurent Garnier; Dave Clarke; Vitalic; H-Foundation; 20:20 Soundsystem; Brett Johnson; Mash (Jengahead)	Röyksopp; Richie Hawtin; Green Velvet; Slam; DJ Sneak; GusGus; FC Kahuna; Ewan Pearson

=== T Break Stage ===
Saturday 12 July	Sunday 13 July
Sound Development Agency; The Silver Pill; The Gems; Trash Can Sinatras; Eastern Lane; Dogs Die in Hot Cars; Stylus Automatic; Michael Rattray; Katy Bar the Door; Small Enclosed Area; Deckard; Mydas	Raar; Stickman; Ursula Minor; El Presidente; Geoff Martyn; Torqamada; Cherry Falls; [Cayto]; Alyssa's Wish; Amateur Guitar Heroes; Mercury Tilt Switch; Carson
