= The Eastern Swell =

Scottish psychedelic folk band

- Origin: Edinburgh, Scotland
- Genres: psychedelic folk
- Years active: 2014-2019
- Labels: Stereogram Recordings
- Members: Lainie Urquhart; Chris Reeve; Neil Collman; Andy Glover

The Eastern Swell were a Scottish psychedelic folk band based in Edinburgh, consisting of Lainie Urquhart (vocals, tambourine), Chris Reeve (vocals, guitar), Neil Collman (vocals, bass) and Andy Glover (drums). They have been generally described as prog-folk but utilised a variety of genres and styles, with Gus Ironside writing in Louder than War that their "accomplished debut captures an air of pastoral unease reminiscent of Jackie Leven’s below-the-radar debut album, the lost acid-folk masterpiece, ‘Control’". They were signed to Edinburgh's Stereogram Recordings, run by Jeremy Thoms of The Cathode Ray and Innes Reekie, one of the producers of Big Gold Dream.

Originally called Lainie & the Crows and described by The Skinny (magazine) as a "rootsy modern-retro outfit laced with country-tinged harmonies, rockabilly twangs, sweet Appalachian blues and the occasional laid-back heartbreaker", the band supported folk rock acts such as Jon Allen (musician) at King Tut's Wah Wah Hut.

Adding a British folk rock and Progressive folk element to their sound, the band changed their name to The Eastern Swell. Their debut album, 'One Day, A Flood', was recorded with Pete Harvey from Modern Studies (band) and was released on 16 September 2016. The album was described by The Scotsman as “blissful, burnished reveries...a pleasing patchouli oil-scented blend of prog rock, pastoral folk and psych soul”. The album also garnered a review in the Scottish Daily Express on 20 October 2016 which stated; "The sound is steeped in the '70s but still manages to sound current [...] If you can imagine a mix of Fairport Convention, Jefferson Airplane and Syd Barrett-era Floyd, it might sound like this." Louder Than War called it “A rather magical album, and definitely one of the finest releases of 2016”. Writing in the online editorial 'Is this Music?', Roy Moller gave the album 4.5 stars out of 5 and made reference to Crosby, Stills & Nash (album) and the Zombies' Odessey and Oracle.

The band continued to play live, supporting psychedelic rock band Trembling Bells and went on to release a second album, ‘Hand Rolled Halo’, on 16 November 2018. Writing in the March 2019 issue of Prog (magazine), Grant Moon stated that the album had a “deeply pleasing sense of tradition [...] rich in harmonic ideas and pastoral tones”. Penny Black Music described it as “Musically complex and lyrically rewarding” and said “it is a consistently compelling experience from a band who have taken the influences of the past and then done something original and new with it”. Writing in The Scotsman, Fiona Shepherd called it “timeless and seamless" with the band "embellishing the psych folk and prog rock of opening track Miles From Home with a bright horn break straight out of the Burt Bacharach songbook, applying western swing fiddle and trad jazz trumpet to the scurry of Zeitgeist and offering a sensitive psychedelic reading of folk standard Blackwaterside, which showcases Chris Reeve’s guitar playing as much as Lainie Urquhart’s storytelling.". In a further positive review for KLOF Magazine Ken Abrams stated that it was “An impressive album, blending the traditional folk of artists like Sandy Denny, Bert Jansch, and the Richard & Linda Thompson, with more contemporary sounds from alt-folk artists like Ryley Walker"
