= Kat Flint =

British singer

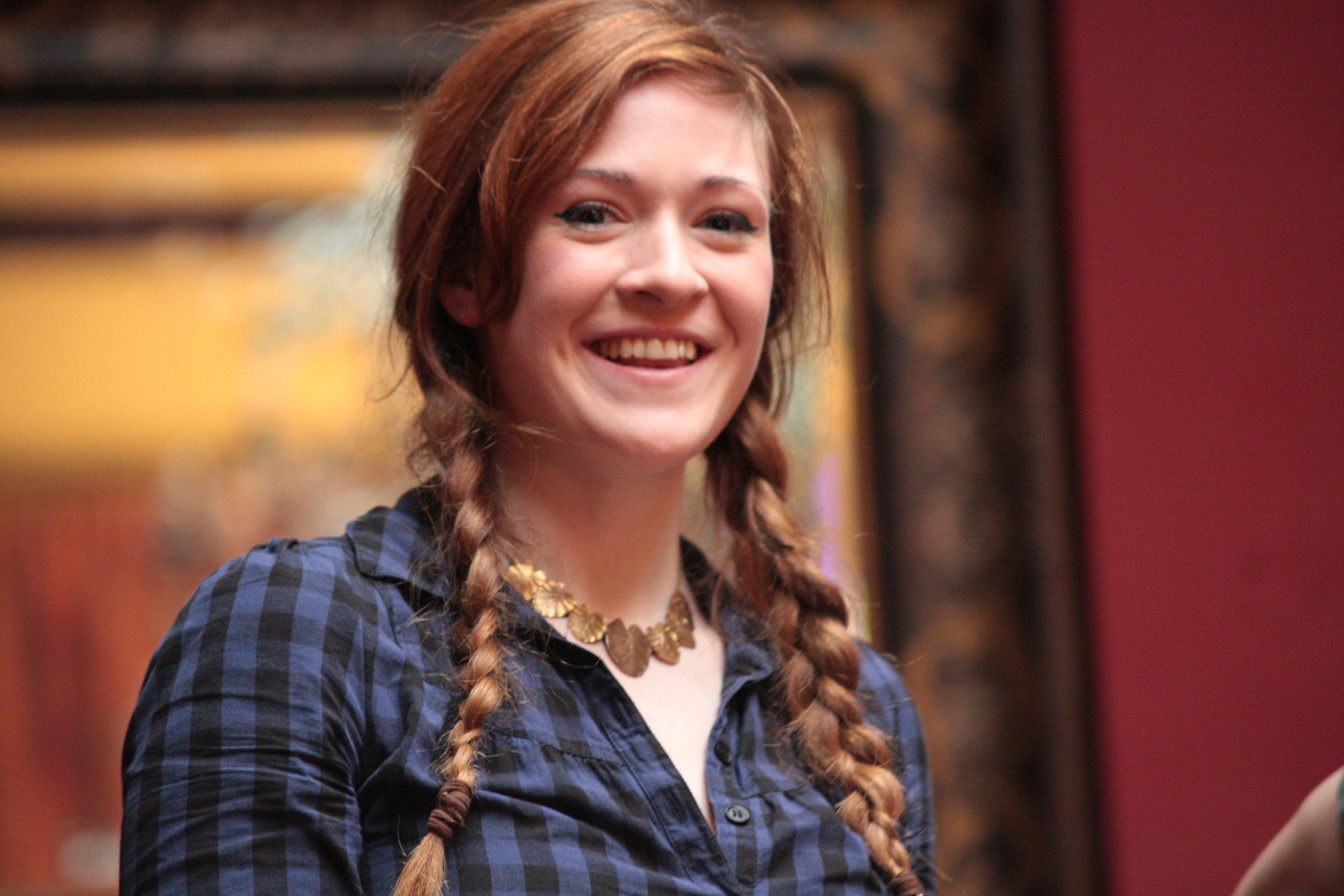
Kat Flint at the videoshoot for her single "Go Faster Stripes"

Kat Flint is a Scottish singer-songwriter born in Barbados and raised in Aberdeen. Her first album, Dirty Birds was released in 2008.

== Biography ==
Kat Flint was born in Barbados and raised in Edinburgh and Aberdeen. At the age of 18, she moved to Edinburgh to study, where she joined the city's acoustic scene and formed the band Gingergreen. She was an original member of the Edinburgh Sound Collective and also spent six months singing and playing percussion with folk group Scuff. In 2004, she moved to London.

Of her lyrics, she says, "I write lyrics about junkyard prostitutes, life in the fearsome crowd and the fact that your lover is 72.8% water. I was told once that I'm pretty good on guitar 'for a girl'. I wasn't sure if that was a compliment. I am an active campaigner against teenage angst and histrionics in music. I quite like train journeys because they're one of the rare occasions when I can just sit and think."

== Music ==
=== Gingergreen ===
From 2000 to 2004, Kat Flint was a vocalist, guitarist and songwriter with Edinburgh acoustic group Gingergreen, which also featured Andrew Thompson (songwriting; vocals; guitar; percussion) and Robin Mogendorff (bass). The group gigged extensively around Edinburgh and were voted the city's favourite acoustic act in the 2004 Edinburgh Acoustic Idols Awards. In 2004 the band home-recorded an album that is as-yet unreleased.

=== Solo work ===
In 2005, Flint started uploading home-recorded demos to Myspace and posted out free CD copies of the tracks to anyone who requested them. In 2006, she signed to the independent label Naz Recordings, who released her debut EP The Secret Boy's Club. Kat followed up with her first full-length album, Dirty Birds, the recording of which was funded by fan donations collected via Myspace. The album was released in September 2008 by London label Albino Recordings. Four of the 12 songs on the album – "Ohio", "Anticlimax", "The Blinking" and "Fearsome Crowd" – were reworked versions of songs from The Secret Boys Club. Her first single, "Go Faster Stripes", which uses various household objects in its recording, was released in December 2007, also on Albino Recordings. The second single from the album, "Christopher, You Are a Soldier Now", was inspired by her brother's near-enlistment in the British armed forces, he now owns a bar in Edinburgh called Bond No9. Both single and album have received critical acclaim from popular and mainstream critics, notably Steve Lamacq of the BBC, who has called Kat "a great singer-songwriter".

=== Shipwreckers ===
In 2009, Flint formed the band Shipwreckers for live shows, featuring two members of London indie/rock band Revere – Nicholas Hirst (guitar, piano, accordion, percussion) and Kathleen McKie (cello) – and her former bandmate Andrew Thompson (bass, vocals, percussion). Nathaniel Mumford of Albino Recordings also occasionally guests on trumpet.

== Discography ==
The Secret Boy's Club (EP) (2006) – Naz Recordings

1. "Fearsome Crowd"
2. "Ohio"
3. "Headrush"
4. "London Lullaby"
5. "Anticlimax"
6. "The Blinking"

Go Faster Stripes (single) (2007) – Albino Recordings

1. "Go Faster Stripes"
2. "Joseph"

Christopher, You're a Soldier Now (single) (2008) – Albino Recordings

1. "Christopher, You're a Soldier Now"
2. "Shadow Boxing"

Dirty Birds (2008) – Albino Recordings

1. "Go Faster Stripes"
2. "Ohio"
3. "Anticlimax"
4. "Lazybones"
5. "Christopher, You're a Soldier Now"
6. "The Blinking"
7. "Saddest Blue Dress"
8. "Birthday"
9. "Fearsome Crowd"
10. "Shotgun Wedding"
11. "Candyfloss Branches"
12. "Dirty Birds"

== Non-musical projects ==
In 2010 Flint took a step back from music to pursue illustration and design. Her work has been featured in a number of blogs and exhibitions. In 2011 she designed a pair of totem pole sculptures for London's Royal Parks Foundation. These stand at the entrance to the Isis Education Centre in Hyde Park, London, a nature & conservation centre for inner-city children. The pieces were inspired by William Roscoe's 1802 poem, The Butterfly's Ball, and the Grasshopper's Feast, and were carved by chainsaw carver Dan Cordell. In 2013, she designed a limited edition "heliograph-style" record sleeve for Revere's album "My Mirror/Your Target".
