= Anna Arnott =

Anna "Annie" Arnott
- Born: Annag Iain Mhurchaidh (Anna Mackenzie); 1887; Linicro, Isle of Skye, Scotland
- Died: 1978 (aged 90–91)
- Occupation(s): singer, crofter, shop keeper
- Musical career
- Genres: puirt à beul
- Instrument: Vocals

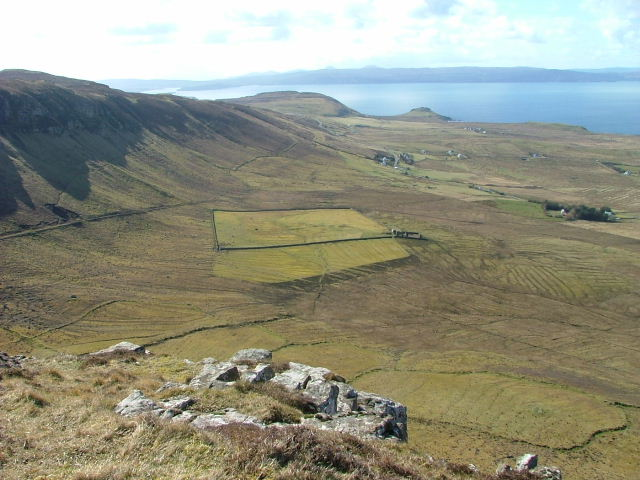
Linicro, Arnott's birthplace, from Creag Stoirm

Anna "Annie" Arnott (née Mackenzie; 1887–1978) was a Scottish singer who sang in Scottish Gaelic in the puirt à beul style.

== Biography ==
Arnott was born and raised in Linicro, near Uig on the Isle of Skye in Scotland. She learned many songs from her mother who was descended from the MacDonald bards. She was regarded as one of the foremost exponents of traditional Gaelic song. Her singing was recorded in 1950 by Derick Thomson and later by Calum Maclean and by others from the School of Scottish Studies at the University of Edinburgh. Many of her recordings are archived on Tobar and Dualchais. The song Seallaibh Curaigh Eoghainn (Look at Ewen's Coracle) was included on a compilation of music from the Western Isles.

She was a housewife, crofter and also had a shop in Linicro. She lived in Glasgow for many years, eventually returning to Skye.
