= Trinity Academy, Edinburgh =

State School in Edinburgh, Scotland

Trinity Academy
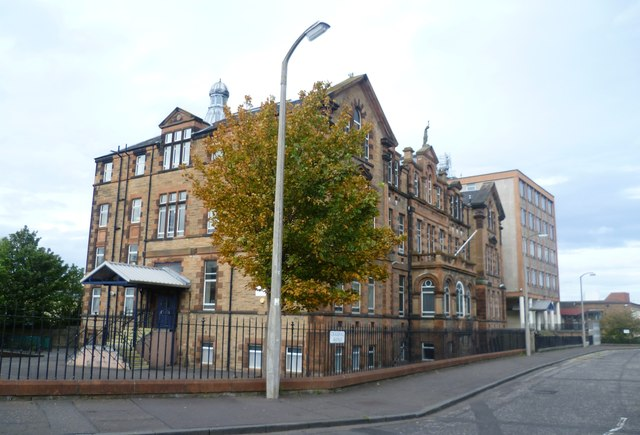
- The Trinity Academy complex, showing the original building (left) and the newer extension block (far right)

Location
- Craighall Avenue; Edinburgh, EH6 4RT; Scotland; 55.97638°N 3.19542°W

Information
- Type: Non-denominational state-funded secondary school
- Established: 1893
- Local authority: City of Edinburgh Council
- Dean: Nick Burge
- Staff: 107
- Gender: Mixed
- Age: 11 to 18
- Enrolment: 946
- Houses: Arran, Orkney, Tiree and Skye
- Colours: Yellow and Black
- Website: https://www.trinity.edin.sch.uk

Trinity Academy is a state-run secondary school in the north of Edinburgh, Scotland. It is located on the border between Trinity, Newhaven, and Leith, next to Victoria Park, and a short distance from the banks of the Firth of Forth at Newhaven.

== Admissions ==
Trinity Academy was formerly a fee paying, selective senior secondary school, prior to the abolition of the Selective Qualifying Exam, which was normally taken in Primary 7 at age 11 or 12 years. It is now a non-selective, comprehensive school, and receives most of its first year pupils from three local 'feeder' primary schools; Trinity Primary (which is immediately adjacent), Victoria Primary in Newhaven, and Wardie Primary in Granton.

== History ==
The school was designed in 1891 by George Craig, a Leith architect for the Leith School Board.

== Rugby ==
Trinity Academy's first XV rugby team won Rugby World Team of the Month in November 2005 after an unbeaten run including away wins at George Heriot's, Glenalmond and Hutchison Grammar School. Bangholm sports ground is also home to the Trinity Academicals Rugby Football Club.

== Rectors ==
Below is a list of people who have served as Rector of Trinity Academy:

- Nick Burge (2020-)
- Bryan Paterson (2015–2020)
- Alec Morris (2008–2015)
- Peter Galloway C.B.E. (1983–2008)
- William Brodie (1969–1983)
- Alexander Neill (1953–1969)
- Dr. Albert Weir (1942–1953)
- James Scott (1925–1942)
- Thomas Duncan (1901–1925)
- Thomas Trotter (1893–1901)

== Notable alumni ==
- Alexander Bennett (1929–2003), ballet dancer
- Gordon Connell, Scottish rugby international
- John Alexander Fraser, posthumously awarded George Cross for gallantry
- Darren Jackson, Scottish Football International/Hibernian
- Malcolm MacPherson (1904 - 1971) - politician)
- Darren McGregor, footballer (Hibernian F.C.)
- Paul Mitchell (broadcaster), sports commentator
- Roy Moller, Scottish singer, songwriter and poet
- Lewis Niven, Rugby Player
- Martin O'Neill, Baron O'Neill of Clackmannan, Scottish politician
- Sir William Patey (1971), British Diplomat
- Rachel Robertson (born 2007), racing driver
- Sam Stanton, footballer (Dundee United)
- Danny Swanson, footballer (Hibernian F.C.)
- Mark Watt, Scottish Cricket International (Scotland national cricket team), (Derbyshire County Cricket Club)
- Scott Wilson, footballer (Rangers F.C.)
- Dorothy Bain, Scottish advocate
