= Puirt à beul =

Scottish singing style

Puirt à beul (pronounced [pʰurˠʃtʲ a ˈpial̪ˠ], literally "tunes from a mouth") is a traditional form of song native to Scotland (known as portaireacht in Ireland) that sets Gaelic lyrics to instrumental tune melodies. Historically, they were used to accompany dancing in the absence of instruments and to transmit instrumental tunes orally.

== Term ==
The Scottish Gaelic term port à beul refers to "a tune from a mouth—specifically a cheerful tune—which in the plural becomes puirt à beul". In Scotland, they are usually referred to as puirt à beul but a variety of other spellings and misspellings also exists, for example port-a-beul, puirt a bheul, puirt a' bhéil, etc. These are mostly because a number of grammatical particles in Gaelic are very similar in nature, such as the definite article a, the prepositions "of" and "to" which can both be a and the preposition á "from" which can appear without the acute accent.

Modern Irish dictionaries give port (aireacht) béil, translated as "mouth music" also referred to as lilting. Older dictionaries, such as Dinneen, only give portaiḋeaċt, portaireaċt, or portonaċt. Puirt à beul are related to Irish lilting, Scottish diddling, New Brunswick chin music, and other "Celtic" forms of mouth music. However, whereas these latter forms of mouth music consist of improvised vocables, puirt à beul lyrics are fixed and almost always consist of "real" (i.e. lexical) words, although sometimes vocables are also present.

== Origin ==
Puirt à beul have sometimes been used for dancing when no instruments were available. They have also been used to help soothe an upset child, or act as a tool for learning the tune on an instrument. Although some people believe that puirt à beul derive from a time when musical instruments, particularly bagpipes, were unavailable because they were banned, there is no evidence that musical instruments were banned by the Disarming Act 1715 or the Act of Proscription 1746. In his book Traditional Gaelic Bagpiping 1745-1945, John Gibson reprints the entire Disarming Act 1746, which is usually blamed for the proscription of bagpipes, and shows that bagpipes were not banned.

== Characteristics ==
Usually, the genre involves a single performer singing lighthearted, sometimes bawdy lyrics, occasionally supplemented with meaningless vocables.

In puirt à beul, the rhythm and sound of the song often have more importance than the rhythm of the lyrics. Normally, puirt are sung in a 4/4 (reel or strathspey) or 6/8 (jig) metre. Although puirt à beul are traditionally performed by a solo singer, there are many choral arrangements or puirt à beul today, and group performances are sometimes presented at mods.

Some elements of puirt à beul may have originated as memory aids or as alternatives to instrumental forms such as bagpipe music.

We also have puirt a beul or mouth music—songs in which the rhythm of the words is meant to replicate the rhythm of certain dance tunes. Some of these songs may have been composed to assist fiddlers, and occasionally pipers, in learning a tune. Others may have been composed as a means of remembering tunes when the playing of the bagpipes or fiddle were proscribed or frowned upon.

A well-known example of puirt à beul is "Brochan Lom", which is sung in the film Whisky Galore!, and occurs as background music in the film The Bridal Path. A third example, sung by Kitty MacLeod and her sister, occurs in Walt Disney’s Rob Roy, the Highland Rogue, during the wedding celebration. In music, the likes of Julie Fowlis, Mànran, Capercaillie, and Hò-rò have all recorded their own interpretations of the puirt à beul.

Quadriga Consort has been the first ensemble to bring puirt à beul into early music revival.

== See also ==
- Crimping
- Mouth Music (band)
- Non-lexical vocables in music
- Scat singing
- Waulking song
