= Jo Mango =

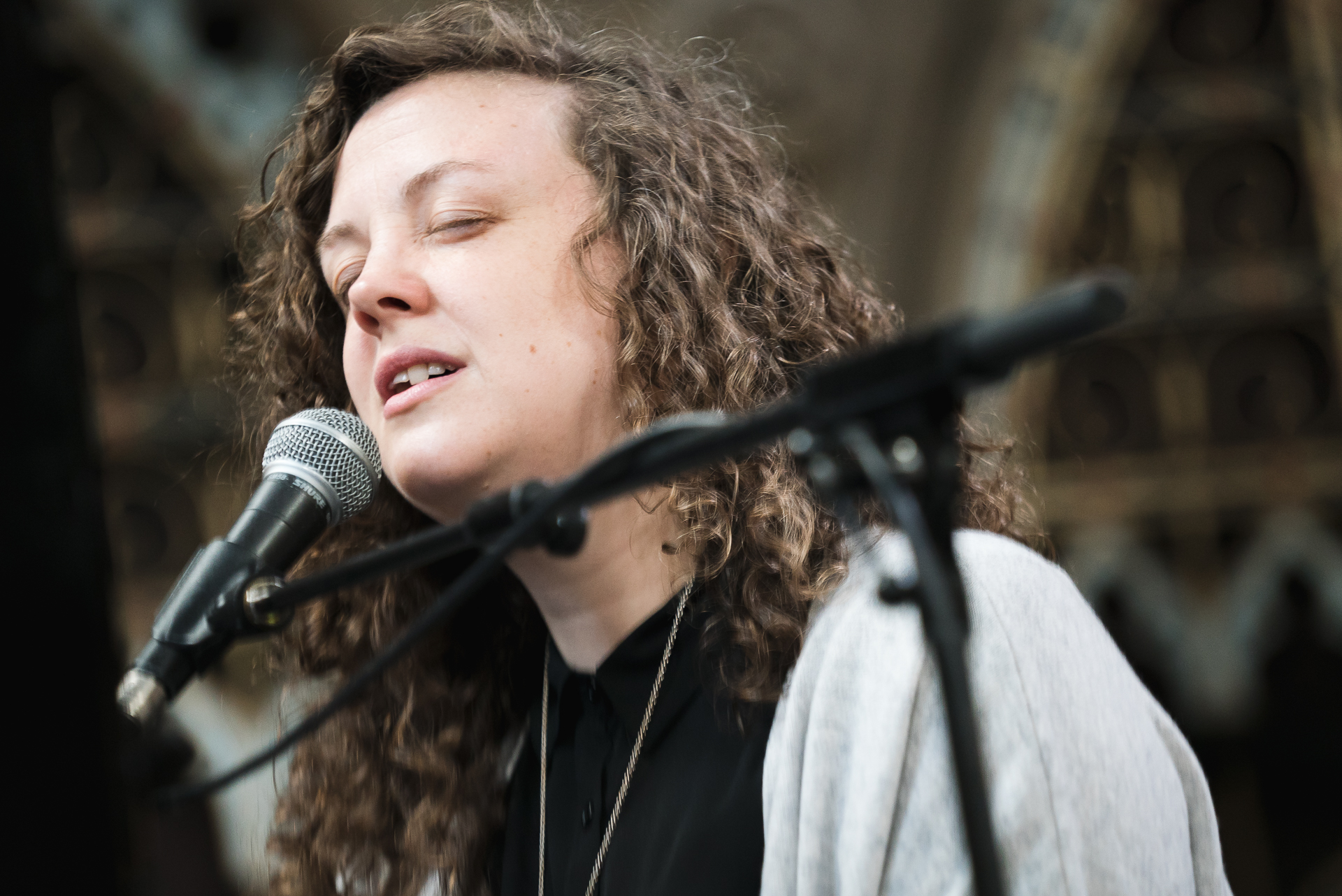
Jo Mango

Jo Mango is the stage name of a British alternative folk and acoustic singer and songwriter from Glasgow, otherwise known as Jo Collinson Scott, a lecturer at the University of the West of Scotland. Jo Mango has also been the name of her band.

== Career ==
Born in Yorkshire, Scott grew up in rural north-east Scotland. As a teenager she became involved in Aberdeen's music scene; her first band was called The Mangomen and included her twin brother. In 1999 or 2000, at the age of eighteen, she moved to Glasgow to study music and psychology, aiming to become a music therapist. There she also developed her skills via open mic nights at the Glasgow bar Nice 'n' Sleazy's, and by playing in the National Youth Jazz Orchestra and a folk band named The Old Blind Dogs.

Scott's first album, Paperclips and Sand, emerged in 2006. 2006–7 saw Scott touring internationally as a member of Vashti Bunyan's band, and in the UK on the Zero Degrees of Separation tour alongside Bunyan, David Byrne, Adem, Juana Molina, and Vetiver. At this time, Scott named key influences as 'Emiliana Torrini, Stina Nordestam, Bright Eyes, Ben Folds, Bjork, Kate Rusby, quirky indie acoustica'. Other collaborations in the years around 2010 included work with Teenage Fanclub and Admiral Fallow.

The Scotland Herald described Scott's 2013 EP When We Lived in The Crook of a Tree as "[a voice] so hushed and precise, that it sounds as if it were recorded inside your own head".

In 2012, Scott completed a PhD in musicology, with the thesis "Experiments in schizoanalysis: a new approach to analysis of conceptual music". By 2015, she had become a lecturer in commercial music at the University of the West of Scotland. She has also taught at the Royal Conservatoire of Scotland.

In the mid-2010s, Scott's work focused on promoting ecological sustainability in music festivals, leading to her EP Wrack Lines, and a project called When Tomorrow Becomes Yesterday.

In the years around 2020, Scott was undertaking creative work relating to prisoners' rehabilitation, leading to her EP System Hold, characterised in The Scotsman as 'featherlight piano balladry with subtle electronic beats' providing 'a chill-out meditation on themes of incarceration, monitoring and suspension of liberty'. The work also involved Scott in a music festival called Distant Voices highlighting the music of people who had experienced the criminal justice system, and her composition of a multimedia piece named A Giant on the Bridge.

== Jo Mango band members ==
At the time of the release of the 2012 album Murmuration, the band named Jo Mango comprised:

- Jo Mango: lead vocals, rhythm guitar, kalimba, toy piano, concertina
- Jim Mango: bass player, backing vocals
- Alan Peacock: backing vocals, guitar
- Katherine Waumsley: flute, piano, kalimba and concertina
- Calum Scott: percussion

== Discography ==
=== EPs ===
1. Antidote (2003)
2. Fluffy Brain (2004)
3. The Moth and the Moon / Black Sun (2010)
4. Wrack Lines (2016 – Jo Mango & Friends)
5. System Hold (2019 – Jo Mango & Friends)

=== Studio albums ===
1. Paperclips and Sand (2006)
2. Murmuration (2012)
3. Transformuration (2014 - Remixes of Murmuration)

=== Singles ===
1. "My Lung" (2007 - Download Only)
