= Rebecca Shearing =

- Born: Irvine, North Ayrshire, Scotland
- Origin: Scotland United Kingdom
- Genre: Pop
- Occupation: Singer
- Instruments: Vocals, Piano, Guitar
- Years active: 2012–present

Rebecca Shearing is a Scottish pop singer. She received popular attention in 2007 when she started uploading videos of herself covering hit songs. She was offered her first record deal in November 2007. She decided to finish school before signing a contract. Interest from labels and record industry professionals continued. Shearing has since decided to pursue her career solo.

Rebecca Shearing's debut EP, Paper Lung, was released on 8 October 2012. She has supported the likes of Daniel Powter, Orla Gartland and played in a boxing ring in front of Mike Tyson.

Since 2019, Shearing has been releasing and performing music under the name SHEARS. Shearing has released four EPs as SHEARS, and released her debut album, We Are But Chemicals, on 10 October 2025. As SHEARS, Shearing is a member of the Hen Hoose Collective, whose album The Twelve was shortlisted for the Scottish Album of the Year Award in 2026.

== Education ==
Shearing attended Alloway Primary School and Belmont Academy before studying music at Napier University and graduating in 2013 with First Class Honours.

== Discography ==
=== EPs ===
- Paper Lung (2012) was Shearing's debut EP, released on 8 October 2012

==== Track list ====
No.	Title	Length
1.	"Paper Lung"	3:35
2.	"Just Eighteen"	3:38
3.	"Worth It"	3:32
4.	"Time"	4:35
5.	"Paper Lung (Phantom Affection Remix)"	4:21

Shearing has released four EPs as SHEARS:

- When You're Around (2020)
- Mind in Decline (2021)
- Superhues (2022)
- Now We're Getting Somewhere (2024)

Shearing released her debut album as SHEARS, We Are But Chemicals, on 10 October 2025.
