= Denny and Dunipace Pipe Band =

Scottish pipe band

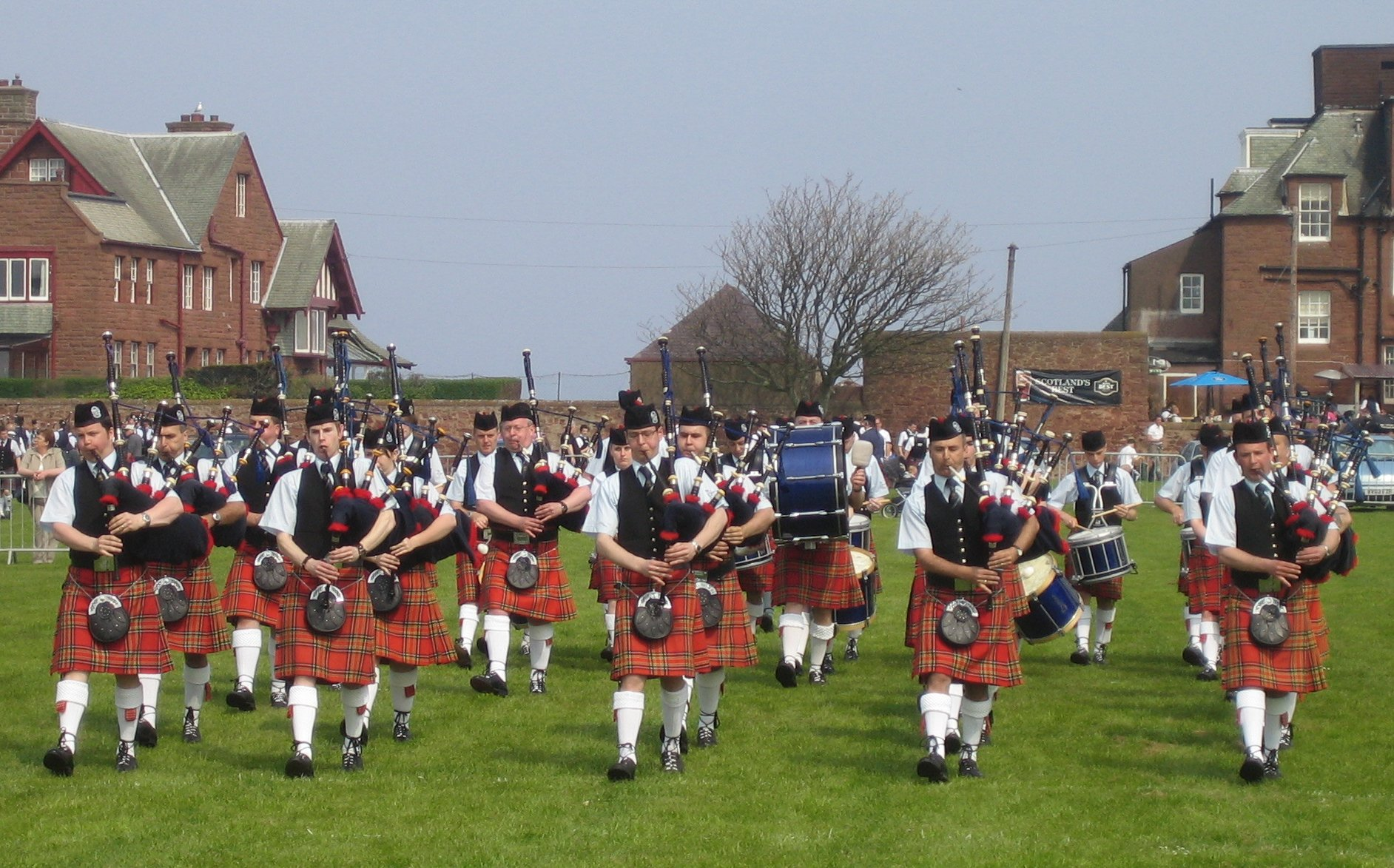
- Established: 1964
- Location: Denny, Scotland
- Grade: 2
- Pipe major: John Cameron
- Tartan: Princess Elizabeth
- Notable honours: Scottish Champions Grade 3A 2024 World Champions Grade 2 2012 Cowal Champions Grade 2 2012 European Champions Grade 2 2012 World Champions Grade 3A 2006

8

Denny and Dunipace Pipe Band is a Grade 2 pipe band based in Denny, near Falkirk, Scotland.

== History ==
The band was established in 1964 by Captain John Deuchar and Roy Smith, who was the first Pipe Major. The band has competed at every level within the contest structure of the Royal Scottish Pipe Band Association, reaching Grade 1 in 1989 and 2012.

David Clunie was appointed Pipe Major of Denny & Dunipace in 2010 alongside Arthur Cook as Lead Drummer. Following some Grade 2 success in 2011 and 2012, including European, World and Cowal Championships in 2012, the band was promoted to Grade 1 for the 2013 season.

Following the COVID-19 pandemic, the organisation was reduced to 1 Grade 3A band, led by Pipe Major Craig Whyte and Lead Drummer Bruce Smith. From 2025 the organisation again aims to have two competing pipe bands, a Grade 2 led by Pipe Major John Cameron and a Grade 4A led by Pipe Major Amy Turnbull.

== Results ==
When in Grade 3A, the band took first place in the 2006 World Pipe Band Championships at Glasgow Green, and won the annual Champion of Champions for 3A. This resulted in promotion to Grade 2 for 2007. Since then, the band placed second at the 2011 World Championships, winning the prize for best drum corps. In 2012, success continued, with 2nd places at both the Scottish and British Championships, and 1st places at the European, Cowal and World Championships taking champion of champions title 2012 and securing promotion to Grade 1. In 2012, the drum corps placed first at the Scottish, British and European Championships. In 2017 the “wee band “ then grade 4A band achieved top six places in four out of five major championships including becoming British Champions and fourth at the World Championships which secured promotion to Grade 3B for the 2018 season.
