= Gary Robertson (author) =

Scottish author, musician and poet

Gary Robertson is a Scottish poet, musician, and author from Dundee, self-styled as the "Dundee Street Poet".

== Biography ==
A fitness fanatic, Robertson has previously climbed all 284 of the Munros. He was the eventual winner of the first series of the BBC television reality show SAS: Are You Tough Enough? After self-funding the publication of SAS 11 Days In A Hell Called Paradise, an autobiographical account of his experience on the show, he became a poet and author. He has so far focused on life for young people growing up in Dundee, and on street poetry in the characteristic Dundonian dialect.

Robertson wrote the book Gangs Of Dundee, an historical account of the gang culture that developed in the post-war Dundee housing schemes of the 1960s onwards. He later presented a programme on BBC Radio Scotland on this subject.

Robertson's street poetry was used in the short documentary Young Anes depicting the life of a struggling young mother in Dundee, which was shortlisted for the best short documentary award at the 2006 Edinburgh International Film Festival. His first collection of poetry was printed in the book Pure Dundee. Along with Mark Thomson also from Dundee, Robertson is the other half of the Tribal Tongues poetry performing duo.

In 2007, Robertson co-founded the Scots language punk band "The Cundeez".

Robertson's other published works includes "Skeem Life", a look at life in Dundee housing schemes, and a biography of ex-Dundee United player Ralph Milne. He lives in the suburb of Fintry in Dundee.

== See also ==
- History of Dundee
