= Yvonne Lyon =

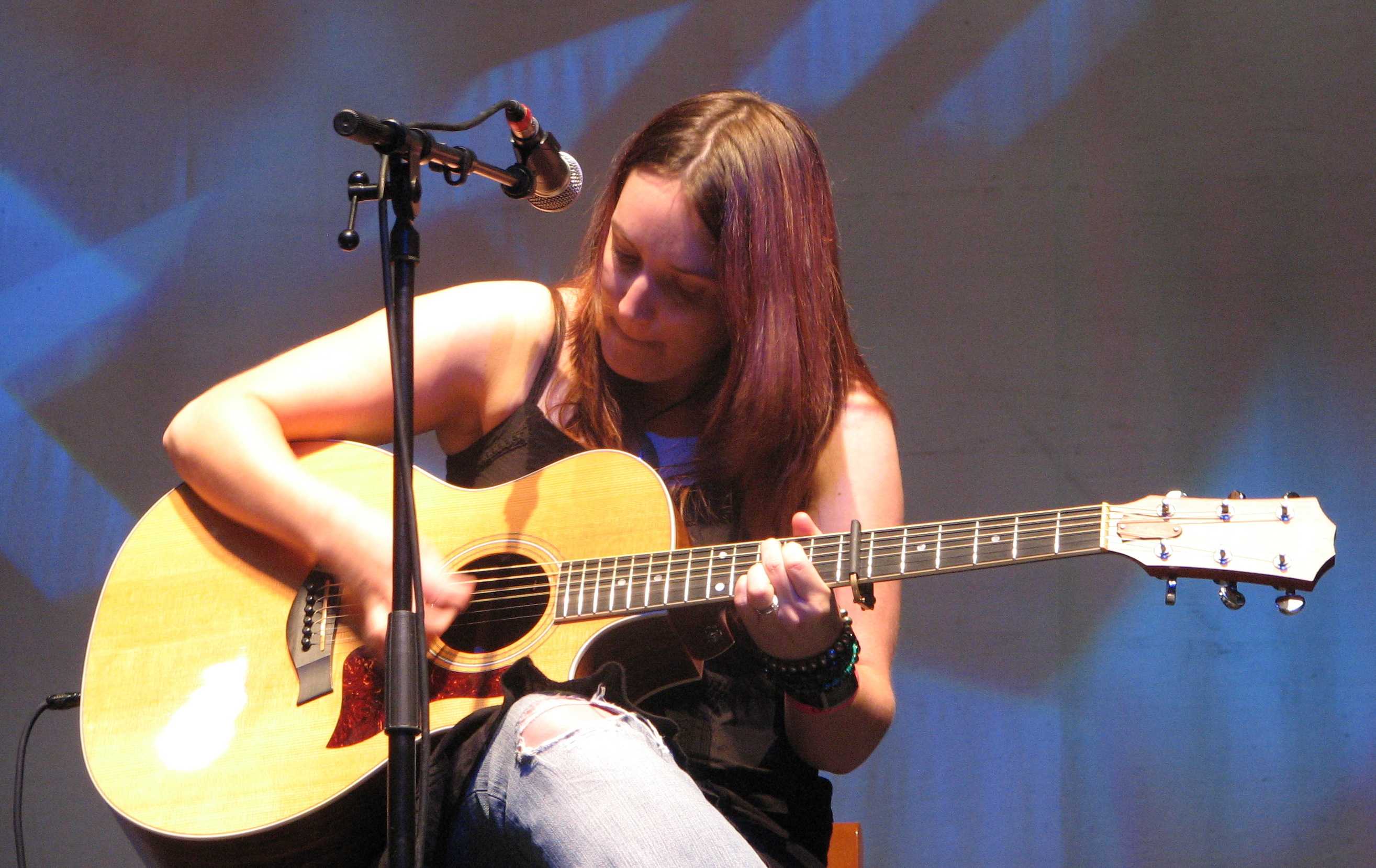
- Yvonne Lyon performing at Greenbelt, 2008

Background information
- Born: Yvonne Whitty
- Origin: Scotland
- Genres: Folk, folk rock; roots rock; folk pop
- Occupations: Singer; songwriter; guitarist; pianist
- Instruments: vocals; singer-songwriter; guitar
- Years active: 1997–present
- Website: yvonnelyonmusic.com

Yvonne Lyon is a Scottish musician, who primarily plays an acoustic folk music sound with roots rock and folk rock elements. She was part of the Glasgow-based band Land from 1997 until 2000. Her solo music career started in 2001, with her first individual release occurring in 2002.

== Early and personal life ==
Lyon was born Yvonne Whitty, in Scotland. She initially had a career as a music teacher. She met her future husband when she was touring with the band Land, where her husband, David Lyon, was a member of the celtic rock band, The Electrics. She resides in Scotland.

== Music career ==
Her music recording career commenced in 1997, with the band Scottish-band Land; they would release three albums, Down the Mountain Slowly in 1997, Rain in the Springtime in 1998, and Point Me to the Skies in 1999. She started her solo musical career in 2001, and has since released seven albums: Horizon Searching in 2002, Fearless in 2005, A Thousand Questions Why in 2007, Ashes & Gold in 2009, More Than Mine in 2012, These Small Rebellions in 2013, and Held in 2015. Lyon has also released one extended play, Journey, in 2003, as Yvonne Whitty.

In 2016, Lyon recorded the album The Space Between with her husband David Lyon and singer-songwriter Gareth Davies-Jones. Based on the Sermon on the Mount, she performed the music in a series of concerts in support of the charity Tearfund later that year.

In 2018, she collaborated with poet and broadcaster Stewart Henderson on Vesper Sky.

In November 2020 she released her 10th studio album, Growing Wild. Lyon claimed that the album was the culmination of a journey involving a lot of performance anxiety and questioning her enjoyment.

== Discography ==
Albums

- Horizon Searching (2002, as Yvonne Whitty)
- Fearless (2005)
- A Thousand Questions Why (2007)
- Ashes & Gold (2009)
- More Than Mine (2012)
- These Small Rebellions (2013)
- Held (2015)

EPs

- Journey (2003, as Yvonne Whitty)

Single

- "I Believe in Christmas/Dear December" (2012)
