= Mr Egg =

Acid House musician

James Matthew McDonald, better known as Mr Egg (born 7 January 1959 in Inverness, Scotland) is a musician credited as being one of the founding fathers of UK Acid House music. After playing bass guitar in punk groups The Cunts and The Fakes, he formed the group Egebamyasi in 1984, and named it after Can's third studio album, citing Can and Captain Beefheart as influences.

== Discography ==
=== Singles and EPs ===
- Circumstances Survival SUR T 36 1986 UK
- EBY E.P Groove Kissing GK008 1991 BEL
- Acid Indigestion Pt I Groove Kissing GK016 1992 BEL
- Acid Indigestion Pt 2 Groove Kissing GK017 1992 BEL
- Acid Indigestion E.P IT Records IT002 1992 UK
- Variation T&B Vinyl TB002 1993 UK
- Variation - (Lenny Dee Remix) T&B Vinyl TB003 1993 UK
- I Want More Finiflex FF003 1993 UK
- Ex Ovo Omnia (Liveggs) Finiflex FF006 1993 UK
- Pizzacid Finiflex FF0012 1994 UK
- Eightball Senior SNR009 1994 UK
- Acidnation Soma SOMAO19 1994 UK
- Store in a Cool Place Finiflex FF013 1995 UK
- Remont (with Erasure) featuring Lucy Robson Finiflex FF014 1995 UK
- Acid Indigestion Pt 3 Abbey Discs ABBYD003 1996 EIRE
- 1234 Beef Innovation ET002 1997 UK
- Acid Indigestion Pt 4 Binary Baseline Bin Bass 005 2006 BEL
- Bang the Boss (Digital Download) Fluid Groove 2006
- Egebamyasi-The Remixes (Digital Download only) Fluid Groove 2006
- I,v Lost Control-remix MacAcid Records 2007 UK

=== Albums ===
- How To Boil An Egg UGT UGTLP/CD002 1995 UK
- Mother Goose Subversive SUB40D 1997 UK

=== Compilations ===
- Total Mr Egg Total 1990 UK
- Total Vol 1 Mr Egg Parade Amoureuse PHOE12/CD 1991 GER
- A Dance Sampler Vol 1 Braindamage Groove Kissing GK009CD 1992 BEL
- A Dance Sampler Vol 2 Illegal Substance Groove Kissing GK026 1992 BEL
- Mix The House Kinky Love Disco EVA 743121-116222 1992 NED
- Techno Trance 2 Acid Indigestion Arcade 0170061 1992 NED
- Techno Trance Acid Indigestion Koda Muzik 92.34.U.88.011 1992 TUR
- Acidrave Apocalypse Hardcore EBY Tune RCA PD 75375 1992 Italy
- And Away They Go I Want More Finiflex FF1001 1993 UK
- This Is Techno Vol 6 Variation Continuum1930-2 1993 USA
- Midnight Madness Variation Triumph TRLP 1CD 1993 UK
- Trance Mix Sponge Melodia BMI 7001 1993 ISR
- Future Music Magazine Superclouds Future Music 4/94 1994 UK
- Unpaved Roads Route 2 Pizzacid NUT006 1995 NED
- Ghetto Tone Variation (remix) Outland Records 94 12003 1995 NED
- The Serious Road Trip Eightball MCD 11195 1995 UK
- Mixmag Vol 19 Acidnation MML CD19 1995 UK
- Suck Me Plasma Acidnation 7000 OHM 1995 GER
- Hypno Trance 2 Acidnation Arcade 9902231 1995 GER
- Quality Recordings Vol 2 Acidnation Soma CD003 1995 UK
- Foundations (Coming Up from the Streets) Bambient The Big Issue FCl002CD 1996 UK
- Endless Loops Vol 1 Acidnation Slush EL001 2005 CAN

=== Remixes ===
- The Fugue - Sensitized (Sensi Version) Different Class 1994 UK
- Dance Overdose - Overdose Stomp (Cement Mix) Resonance Recs 1994 UK
- Dreadzone - Fight The Power (Acidzone Version) Totem Records 1994 UK
- Chill FM - New Beginning 1994 UK
- Gary Numan - Me, I Disconnect from You Beggars Banquet 1995 UK
