= Gwendolen McGill =

Scottish musician and teacher (born 1910)

Gwendolen Mary Finlayson McGill
- Born: 29 April 1910; Ayr, Scotland, U.K.
- Known for: Scottish musician, composer, music teacher

Gwendolen Mary Finlayson McGill (born 29 April 1910) was a Scottish musician, composer and music teacher, born in Ayr. She composed for, arranged for and taught the piano, cello and Celtic harp. She performed these instruments in Britain and Europe. While performing on the cello she was accompanied by pianists such as Gerald Moore and Ernest Lush.

== Education ==
She was educated at colleges in Edinburgh, Vienna, Paris, Salzburg and Prades.
