= Fran and Anna =

Scottish musical duo

- Frances and Anna Watt posing in a publicity photograph

Background information
- Origin: Coatbridge, Lanarkshire, Scotland
- Genres: Scottish folk music; Novelty songs; Variety
- Years active: c.1950-1996
- Labels: Nevis; Scotia
- Past members: Frances Watt; Anna Watt

Frances Watt, BEM (16 March 1922 – 14 October 2003) and Anna May Watt, BEM (4 January 1924 – 19 February 2009) were two Scottish sisters from Coatbridge, Lanarkshire, who formed the singing duo Fran and Anna. They came from a showbusiness family, and were child performers, touring Lanarkshire clubs from an early age. They initially joined their father David and sister Lily, a pianist, on stage as puppeteers. They remained in show-business for almost seven decades. Lily became their manager, and continued until her death in 1998.

Their father David was a ventriloquist and children's entertainer who went by the stage name Valentine Prince; he came from a family of musicians. He was married to Margaret Lacey (née Tobin). Fran and Anna came from a family of five siblings who never married and who shared a house in Coatbridge. They performed as "The Prince Sisters" internationally and on cruise ships in the 1950s and 1960s. In the early 1970s, they changed their name to "Fran and Anna", and started to appear regularly on the STV programme Thingummyjig. They also appeared with Terry Wogan on his show in the 1980s. They were both awarded the British Empire Medal in 1989 for services to light entertainment.

Fran and Anna were known for their tartan miniskirts, rouged cheeks and fishnet stockings. They were known for jabot-fronted tartan mini dresses, with matching tartan hats, each decorated with a large feather. Their style is often referred to as "tartan kitsch". They are reported to have worn their trademark style daily. Their friend and fellow performer Johnny Beattie said that he never saw them without full make-up and costume, even when not working, commenting, "I think they even went to bed like that".

Fran and Anna performed many times at the Pavilion Theatre in Glasgow, giving their last performance there in 2002 alongside Jack Milroy and Johnny Beattie; with Gordon Cree playing the piano.

Fran died of pneumonia in 2003 at the family home in Coatbridge. Terry Wogan, in his condolences on Fran's death, praised the duo. Anna died of natural causes at St Andrews Hospice in Airdrie six years later. The sisters are buried alongside one another in the Old Monkland Cemetery in Coatbridge.
