= The Cundeez =

Scottish punk rock band

The Cundeez are a punk rock band from Dundee, Scotland. Formed in 2007, the band consists of Gary Robertson (singer and bagpiper), Stevie Cundee (bassist), Trotsky Cundee (guitarist), and Tez "the Cockney" Cundee (drummer).

Their songs are in the Dundonian dialect of Scots. Many of their songs are about growing up in the housing projects of Dundee, which are popularly called "Schemes".

The name "The Cundeez" originates from the Dundonian slang for a manhole cover.

Their members include Gary Robertson as singer and bagpiper, Stevie Cundee as bassist, as guitarist and as drummer. The Cundeez have variously described their music style as Punk, "Oary Rock", "Skeem Rock", Ska, and Celtic Music.
