= Little Fire =

Scottish singer-songwriter

Little Fire (born 5 December 1985, in Scotland) is a Scottish singer-songwriter and guitarist.

== Career ==
Musician Jamie McGeechan a.k.a. Little Fire was born in Falkirk in 1985. Raised in Ayrshire from the age of 5 he began performing at a young age.

Little Fire has released one album High Hopes and one EP Roots. He has previously worked with artists including Damien Rice, Joan Armatrading, Dougie MacLean, Eddi Reader, Justin Currie, Andrew Roachford and others.

In October 2014, Little Fire made history as the first person to record an album of Burns songs within Burns Cottage itself. The album entitled 'Roots' was featured on BBC Reporting Scotland in January 2015. His debut album High Hopes was released on 5 December 2014.

Little Fire performed in New York City for the American Scottish Foundation's 21st Annual Burns Supper on 19 January 2015.

'Fire me Up' from the debut album High Hopes is featured on the as yet to be released Hollywood film 'The Drama Club' directed by Joe McClean.

Jamie was made an ambassador for World Peace Tartan by Arun Gandhi in June 2016.
