= The Last Words (band) =

Australian musical group

- Origin: Sydney, New South Wales, Australia
- Genre: Punk
- Years active: 1977–1981
- Labels: Remand; Rough Trade; Armageddon
- Past members: Malcolm Baxter; Andy Groome; Mick Smith; Jeffrey Wegener; John Gunn; Leigh Kendall

The Last Words were an Australian punk rock group formed in 1977 by mainstays Malcolm Baxter on lead vocals (briefly also on drums), and his song writing partner, Andy Groome on guitar (briefly on bass guitar). Their debut single, "Animal World" (March 1978), was released on their own label, Remand Records. A self-titled album appeared in December 1980 but the group disbanded in the following year.

== History ==
The Last Words were an Australian punk rock group formed in Sydney in 1977 by Malcolm Baxter (vocals), Andy Groome (guitar), Mick Smith (bass guitar) and ex-the Saints' Jeffrey Wegener (drums). Baxter, Groome and Smith had been living in suburban, Liverpool when they met Wegener. Wegener left soon after formation and Smith exited before the end of the year. Their debut single, "Animal World" (March 1978), was recorded by the two remaining members with Baxter on lead vocals and drums and Groome on guitar and bass guitar; and it was co-written by the pair. Australian musicologist, Ian McFarlane, described how, "[it] was a poorly recorded, self-produced effort."

Baxter and Groome were joined by Ken Doyle (drums) and Leigh Kendall (bass) to re-record "Animal World", which was re-issued in February 1979 via Wizard Records. Bob Short of Kill Your Pet Puppy, described the label's rationale for signing the group, "As glam faded they desperately looked around for their chunk of the next big thing. If you were looking for an unsigned contender, the Last Words ticked off all their boxes. Authentically working class punk with a firm grip on traditional pop sensibility, Wizard rushed them into the studio and did the business properly."

The Last Words relocated to London and were signed to Rough Trade Records. Doyle remained in Australia and was replaced by local musician, John Gunn on drums. Rough Trade used the Wizard Records version for another re-issue of "Animal World", which appeared in the United Kingdom in October 1979. It reached No. 8 in the Alternative Charts. Their next two singles, "Today's Kidz" (February 1980) and "Top Secret" (August), were followed by their debut album, The Last Words (December 1980). Although it contained a cover version of Jefferson Airplane's "White Rabbit" and was produced by Adrian Sherwood; it did nothing to lift the band out of its relative obscurity. The group disbanded with Baxter returning to Australia.

In December 1979 Kendall had played guitar on a four-track EP, Punks Are the Old Farts of Today (Rock-O-Rama Records RRR 001) by German punk group, Vomit Visions, which were led by Erik Hysteric (p.k.a. Erich Knodt). A recording, by Hysteric, of a gig by the Last Words at London University in March 1981, as support to Killing Joke remains unreleased. After the Last Words broke up, Hysteric's backing band, the Esoterics, had Groome on guitar and bass guitar, Kendall on bass guitar, guitar and vocals, and Gunn on vocals. They were joined by Vomit Visions drummer, Dieter Krist, and appeared on Hysteric's album, Drive You Crazy (1981), via Wasted Vinyl Records. It includes the track, "Frag Mich Warum", which is a German language cover version of the Last Words' "Wondering Why", and is sung by Kendall. Groome and Kendall also played on three tracks "Life" (Waste 45), "Fool Around" and "(I Wanna Be A) Kid Forever" (Waste 9) recorded before the album, which were released as Eric Hysteric's solo singles in 1982 and 1983.

== Discography ==
=== Albums ===
- The Last Words (August 1980) – Armageddon Records (ARM 2)

Walk Away; Top Secret; My Streets Of Fire; Games; Do It Yourself; Semi Detached Love; Today's Kidz / Spectacular Times; The Stranger; It's Alright; Every Schoolboy's Dream; Never Never Man; White Rabbit

(Produced by Zen Gangsters (Adrian Sherwood). Recorded at Berry St, London.)

- The Last Words 1977 - 1980 (Remand Records)

Animal World; No Music; Every Schoolboy's Dream; Today's Kids; Something's Wrong; Games; It's Alright; Top Secret; The Stranger; Animal World (original); Wondering Why

=== Singles ===
- "Animal World" / "Wondering Why" (March 1978) – Remand Records (RRCS 2439) 500 copies pressed, plain white sleeve
  - "Animal World" / "Every Schoolboy's Dream" (February 1979) – Wizard Records (ZS-196) Blue vinyl
  - "Animal World" / "No Music in the World Today" (October 1979) – Rough Trade Records (RT 022) Initial pressing stated that the label was "Rough Trade & Wizard"
- "Today's Kidz" (February 1980) – Remand Records
- "Top Secret" (August 1980) – Armageddon Records
