= The Cathode Ray =

The Cathode Ray are a Scottish alternative band based in Edinburgh, Scotland. The current line-up is Jeremy Thoms (lead vocals/guitar/keyboards), Steve Fraser (guitar/backing vocals), Phil Biggs (guitar/backing vocals), Neil Baldwin (bass), Sean Allison (bass) and David Mack (drums and percussion). Jeremy Thoms also runs the Edinburgh-based record label, Stereogram Recordings, which has released albums by The Cathode Ray, James King and the Lone Wolves, Roy Moller, Band of Holy Joy and Chris Reeve amongst others.

== History ==
Originally based on a loose concept of forging late 1970s New York, with late 1970s Manchester, The Cathode Ray started life in 2006, initially as a song-writing collaboration and “a bit of fun” between Jeremy Thoms and his friend ex-Josef K frontman Paul Haig. The songs written were swift to adopt their own unique stamp and personality, so a band was needed to flesh them out. Adding 1960s garage, soundtracks, glam rock, northern soul, disco and psyche to the palette, recording sessions ensued, with ex-Bluebells and TV21 bassist Neil Baldwin, plus drummer/percussionist David Mack completing the line-up.

A one-off double A–sided single entitled "What’s It All About?" / "Mind" was released in late 2006 on Pronoia Records. The single was awarded 2006 Single Of The Year by Sunday Mail columnist Billy Sloan.

A second single, "Slipping Away", was released in April 2009 through Re-Action Recordings. Journalist Paul Lester proclaimed it a hit single in The Guardian. A revised version (with Thoms on lead vocals) appears on the band's 2012 debut album. Just prior to the release of that single, Paul Haig quit the project, not wishing to be involved with another band. With Thoms assuming all lead vocal and song-writing duties, former Scars/Mike Scott accomplice Steve Fraser joined on lead guitar and backing vocals in 2009.

Writing and recording sessions for their debut album continued with the new line-up throughout 2010 – 2011 at Gold Star Studios in Fife. 2010 also saw The Cathode Ray making their live debut with shows in Edinburgh and Glasgow. They also made an appearance at the Wickerman Festival in 2012.

Their debut album, The Cathode Ray, was finally released in April 2012, through Stereogram Recordings. The single “Dispersal” was Track Of The Month in April 2012 on the Janice Forsyth Show on BBC Radio Scotland. Three tracks, "Train", "Around" and "Dispersal" were lifted from the album as singles.

The Cathode Ray released their second album entitled Infinite Variety on Stereogram Recordings in April 2015, accompanied by the singles "Resist", "Buck The Trend" and "This Force Of Nature".

The Cathode Ray returned in April 2018, after a three-year recording hiatus, with a single "Another World".

Their third album Heightened Senses was released on Stereogram Recordings in November 2019, preceded by the title track as a single in September 2019. Heightened Senses marked the recording debut of guitarist Phil Biggs with the band, plus production assistance, cover art and video direction from Alex Thoms, the son of lead singer Jeremy Thoms. A remix of "Love and Death" by DJ/producer Alex Tronic was the third and final single to be lifted from the album in February 2020.

Following a hiatus caused by the lockdowns during Covid, the band reconvened in 2022 to start work on their fourth album. Titled "Advance Retreat",it was released in September 2024, preceded by three singles: "Travelling In Style", "No Uncertain Terms" and "Consequences". It marked the first release by the band in partnership with Glasgow based label Last Night From Glasgow.

In Spring 2025 it was announced that bassist Sean Allison had joined the band, standing in for Neil Baldwin who has taken an extended sabbatical.

The band's fifteen single "Forever Etched" was released in August 2025.

== Discography ==
=== Albums ===
- The Cathode Ray (2012, Stereogram Recordings)
- Infinite Variety (2015. Stereogram Recordings)
- Heightened Senses (2019, Stereogram Recordings)
- Advance Retreat (2024, Stereogram Recordings/Last Night From Glasgow)

=== Singles ===
- "What's it All About" / "Mind" (2006, Pronoia Records)
- "Slipping Away" (2009, Re-Action Recordings)
- "Train" (2011, Stereogram Recordings)
- "Around" (2012, Stereogram Recordings)
- "Dispersal" (2012, Stereogram Recordings)
- "Resist" (2015. Stereogram Recordings)
- "Buck The Trend" (2015, Stereogram Recordings)
- "This Force Of Nature" / "Resist" (Tony McQue Remix) (2015, Stereogram Recordings)
- "Another World" (2018, Stereogram Recordings)
- "Heightened Senses" (2019, Stereogram Recordings)
- "Love And Death EP" (2020, Stereogram Recordings)
- "Travelling In Style" (2024 Stereogram Recordings/Last Night From Glasgow)
- "No Uncertain Terms" (2024 Stereogram Recordings/Last Night From Glasgow)
- "Consequences" (2024 Stereogram Recordings/Last Night From Glasgow)
- "Forever Etched" (2025 Stereogram Recordings/Last Night From Glasgow)

=== Features ===
- "The Sound Of Stereogram" (2015, Stereogram Recordings)
