= The Primary 5 =

- Origin: Glasgow, Scotland
- Genres: Alternative rock, power pop
- Years active: 2003–2010
- Past members: Paul Quinn; Ryan Currie

The Primary 5 was a Scottish pop band from Glasgow, Scotland, formed in 2003 by former Teenage Fanclub and Soup Dragons drummer Paul Quinn. The name referred to the band being the fifth that Quinn had played in. The band's first album, North Pole (2004), was self-released on Quinn's Bellbeat Music label. They signed with Re-Action Recordings for the second album, Go! (2006). AllMusic's Matt Collar described the album as "A sparkling, sun-drenched blast of melodic guitar pop" and said it was "a superb album equal to its predecessor in every way – and perhaps even a little better."

The third album, High Five (2008), was recorded at Leeders Farm in Norwich, England, and was engineered by Nick Brine, who had previously worked with Oasis and Bruce Springsteen, among others. The album was released on the Neon Tetra label. One critic compared the sound on High Five to the Byrds and Crosby, Stills, Nash & Young.

On 1 November 2010, Quinn released the Primary 5's retrospective Revive – Demos & Rarities – 2001-2008 and announced that the band was officially defunct. The Primary 5 debut album, North Pole, had a 2017 re-release on vinyl via Sugarbush Records. The second release, Go!, had a 2017 re-release on vinyl via the Spanish label Pretty Olivia Records.

== Discography ==
- North Pole LP – Bellbeat Music – 2004
- Go! LP – Re-Action Recordings – 2006
- High Five LP – Neon Tetra Records – 2008
- Revive – Demos & Rarities – 2001-2008 LP – (Self-released through Bandcamp.com) – 2010
