= Nicola Cassells =

Scottish singer

Nicola Annie Cassells (born 25 December 1989) is a Scottish soprano. She is a modern classical singer who performs across a spectrum of classical aria, popular songs, musical theatre, hymns, and traditional Scottish music.

Cassells began her career in the music industry after scooping the Retail Trust charity's talent competition Search for a Star four years ago.
