= Under the Dome =

Under the Dome may refer to:

- Under the Dome (novel), a 2009 novel by Stephen King
  - Under the Dome (TV series), a 2013–2015 television series adaptation
- Under the Dome (film), a 2015 Chinese documentary film
- Under the Dome (band), an ambient music band from Scotland
- "Under the Dome", a 2016 song by Jinjer from the album King of Everything (album)
