= The Porridge Men =

Scottish band

The Porridge Men are a band from Scotland formed in the early 1990s by violinist Murray Fergusson, accordionist Iain MacPhail and piper Donald MacLeod. The band's music is a fusion of traditional Scottish music with modern influences. In June 1997, the band released their only CD, Planet Porridge, on the REL record label. The album was recorded in Edinburgh, Scotland and also featured drummer Andrew Horne and percussionist Tom Wexler.

In 2005, team GBR Figure-Skaters John and Sinead Kerr (from Scotland) chose three tracks from Planet Porridge as the soundtrack to their performances at the British Championships, the European Championships and the 2006 Winter Olympics in Turin.

On 18 April 2008, Edinburgh World Heritage and Meltec Films chose the second track from Planet Porridge ("Wax Reels") as the soundtrack for their short time lapse film called "Enlighten". The film contained scenes and landscapes from around the city of Edinburgh.
