= Wensdy =

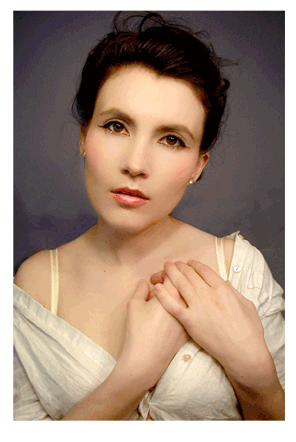
Wensdy was a Scottish recording artist and entertainer

Wensdy (aka Sophia Laurence, born 20 November 1984 in Lenzie, East Dunbartonshire, Scotland) was a Scottish recording artist and entertainer from Moray. Wensdy was an only child raised primarily Glasgow, Scotland.

As a young child Wensdy performed in the Royal National Youth Orchestra playing the Violin. Her musical talent was noticed very young and she would find any opportunity to write, play, sing and dance for everyone as well as picking up a lot of other instruments in the orchestra.

Prior to starting her solo career, she studied at Environmental Art at Glasgow School of Art and Dance and Drama at Performance College. Wensdy released her debut single in May 2010.

In 2010, she released three studio singles in quick succession: "The Puppet", "MyB.O.D.Y" and "GONNA GET IT". All songs received positive feedback from the media and public and played on over 60 worldwide radio stations from their release date, in early 2010. Wensdy assumes creative control over all of her work from the production, rhythm, style and accompanying artwork.

Wensdy cites her primary musical influence as The Black Eyed Peas.

The name Wensdy is Australian slang for Wednesday, Sophia chose this stage name for a number of reasons including the claimed date of the end of the world, 12 December 2012, landing on a Wednesday.

In 2014 Everything disappeared and is missed by many.

== Early years ==
Born in Lenzie, Scotland, her parents divorced when Wensdy was two years old.

Wensdy began developing musical interest early in her life. She began singing at the age of four years. At age four, Wensdy attended dance classes and would often stand on chairs and sing and dance at home. Her enthusiasm for music and art was not entirely understood because her family was serious and believed in working class ethic.

However, Wensdy would continue to write songs and poems for her family and friends on into adulthood. She listened to artists like Michael Jackson and Handel and sing and dance at her grandmother's house regularly, singing anything from "Beat It", "(How Much Is) That Doggie in the Window?", "I Think We're Alone Now" for her aunts and uncles. In addition to this Wensdy went to her father's house most weekends and there she would spend the entire Friday evening in his music studio. Wensdy's father was a businessman, but he had aspirations of being a performer when he was in his 20s. He would host Friday night jam sessions for his friends. Wensdy explains that this was a time when she was very happy and sometimes she could even get up and sing in the studio which she found really exciting.

Around the age of 15, Wensdy's mother parted from her live-in partner, and this was set to greatly affect Wensdy's life. Her mother took to drinking heavily and, by the age of 16, Wensdy was thrown out into the streets of Glasgow without even a pair of shoes.

This was a turning point as Wensdy could yet again focus on her music and art and she shortly after pursued a Portfolio preparation course and got accepted into Glasgow School of Art. Here she was to meet many great friends, however she did not complete the course as she felt it lacked real direction. She had great drive and ambition to succeed and felt that Art School was not bringing all of her dreams into reality.

After several Art Exhibitions and a stint at Performance College Wensdy began to write and produce her own style of music.

== 2010 ==
Wensdy's debut single as a solo artist was "The Puppet" which has received positive feedback.

"The Puppet" was originally titled "The Big Game" and was written over an eight-month period and re-written and re-titled approaching the UK 2010 general election.

"GONNA GET IT" was written by Wensdy over a 2-week period for the 2010 South African World Cup and was released on 11 June. The song was played in South Africa on a number of stations including a live interview on Radio West Coast with Achmat George. At the climax of the World Cup "GONNA GET IT" was played on Ukhozi FM which has an estimated listener ship of 6.67 million. Wensdy was also interviewed by Shaakirah De Vries to be featured in the October edition of the South African 17 Magazine

Wensdy often collaborated with American Rappers and did so in "GONNA GET IT" and MyB.O.D.Y.

Wensdy described her music as having a great influence from her earlier life and the desire to make people happy and this was ultimately achieved, Wensdy aimed to release two mini albums by 2014.

The band has long since ended due to sudden unforeseen circumstances, but her music still lives on within the echo's of time. art, music, dance and fashion.
