= Revere (band) =

REVERE
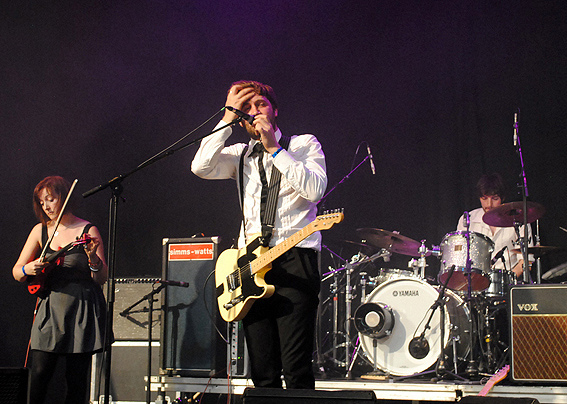
- Revere onstage at Wychwood Festival, 2011

Background information
- Origin: London, England
- Genres: Post-rock, indie-rock, chamber pop
- Years active: Circa 2006–2016
- Labels: Albino Recordings; V2 Benelux
- Past members: Stephen Ellis; Ellie Wilson; Nicholas Hirst; Ruban Byrne; Kathleen McKie; Ian Cotterill; Jay Chakravorty; Thom Ashworth; Nathaniel Mumford; Andrew Hawke; Jonathan Fletcher; Seb Pidgeon; Marc Rollins; Russell Cook; James Garnett; Raphael Saib; Brian O'Hare
- Website: Official website

Revere (stylised as REVERE) was an English indie rock band based in London, England, active between c.2005-2016

== History ==
=== 2005-2010: Early years and Hey! Selim ===
Initially formed by Stephen Ellis, Revere (named after a comic-strip in 2000AD) wrote and performed with a rotating line up until 2005 when Ellis relocated to London. The band self-released several singles and EPs in 2005-06, including 'Learning to Breathe' and "Chloroform".

Revere spent the years between 2007 and 2010 touring, and working on their debut album. In spring 2010, the band embarked on a UK tour to promote the release of their third single "We Won't Be Here Tomorrow".

September 2010 saw the release of Revere's debut album Hey! Selim. Two tracks were released as lead-up singles, "The Escape Artist" and "We Won't Be Here Tomorrow". The band recorded an in-studio session for "BBC Introducing".

=== 2011-2014: My Mirror / Your Target ===
Revere regrouped to compose and rehearse more material in 2011. A new song, "What Am I If I'm Not Even Dust" was performed on BBC Radio London's Sunday Sessions. The end of 2011 saw the release of four digital remix EPs entitled Revere: Reworked #'s 1-4. In November 2011, Revere toured the UK with Malian kora player and 2-time Grammy Award winner Toumani Diabaté. Toward the end of the tour, Revere and Diabaté recorded several tracks together, including a cover of Joy Division's "Love Will Tear Us Apart". In early 2012, Stephen Ellis returned to The Southbank Centre to accompany Vieux Farka Touré on the track "All The Same" (originally performed by Dave Matthews).

In February 2012, Revere won Channel 5's "Send Us Your Music" competition; their prize was a video for their new song "Keep This Channel Open".

In May 2012, the band launched a Pledgemusic campaign to help fund their second, then untitled, album. In June 2012, the band released its debut single from the album "Keep This Channel Open" and by September 2012, the album had reached its Pledgemusic goals. In November 2012, the band announced that their second album would be called My Mirror / Your Target.

In January 2013, the band announced details of their next single, "I Won't Blame You", scheduled for release in spring. In August 2013, the band signed with V2 Benelux to release the album in October 2013 to Holland and Belgium with other countries the following year. In the same month, the band released its third single from the album "These Halcyon Days". Its B-side was a cover of Depeche Mode's "Enjoy the Silence" and also featured Florence + the Machine's harpist, Tom Moth.

In April 2014, the album saw release in UK along with its final single "A Road from a Flood", also featuring a cover of Scott Walker's "Boy Child".

=== 2015-2016: Man of Atom and split ===
In September 2015, the band signed with Dutch record label Final 500 Records to release an EP called Man of Atom. The EP was released in Holland in November 2015 with lead single "Take Cover". In April 2016, the band announced the UK release of the EP as well as new single "Last Bridge Standing", both for May 2016.

On 10 October 2016, the band announced they were to split up after two final shows, and released a final video from the Man of Atom EP for the track "Sonder".

On 4 November Revere released their final album, Collected Recordings Vol. II - Fell On Deaf Ears, a compilation of archive demo and live recordings dating back to 1998. The album was accompanied by a previously unreleased music video for the track "Out Of My Depth".

The final Revere show was a V11 in Rotterdam on 3 December 2016, and was subsequently voted the 11th-best concert to take place in a Rotown-group owned venue in 2016.
