= The Side =

Scottish band

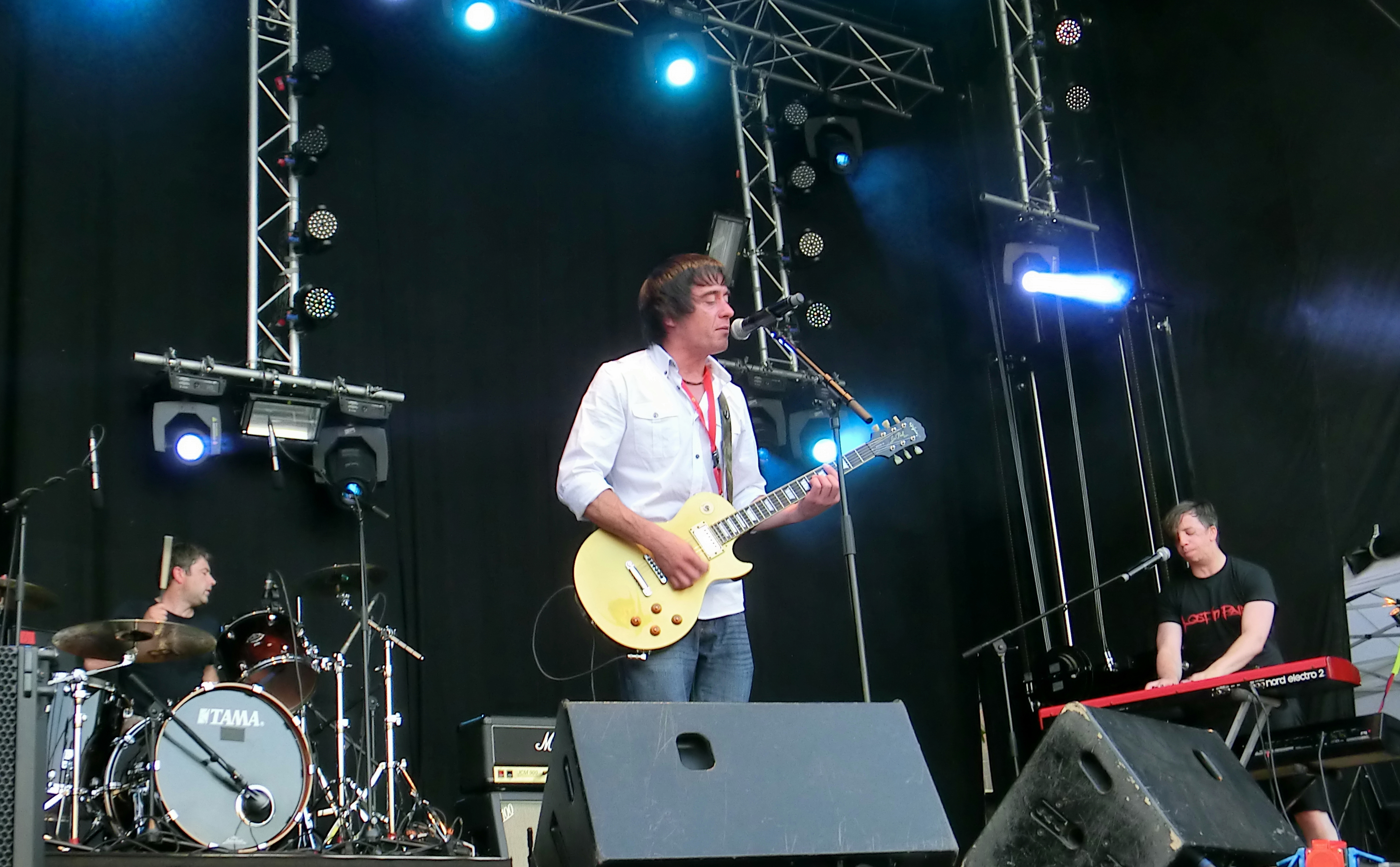
The Side, 2013

The Side are a band from Scotland, which was founded in 2005. They consist of Hugh Winton (guitar, vocals), Jon tarmacer Ross (drums), George Campbell (keyboards) and James Richards (bass).

After four EPs the band produced their first full-length album Nowhere Left To Run in 2009. Their song The County's Going To Hampden, which was written for Ross County F.C., was played during the Scottish Cup final 2010 in Hampden Park. The single also achieved a no.23 position in the UK Indie Breakers Chart.

After winning a contest among unsigned bands, The Side was given the chance to play as opener for Bon Jovi in The O2 Arena London in 2010 to an audience of 23,000 people – the largest indoor capacity in Europe. A concert video is available on DVD.

Since then the band has played at numerous festivals in Europe, including as main support for the band Texas in Luxembourg in July 2011 at Rock um Knuedler, Luxembourg's largest music festival with a capacity audience of 15,000. The Side were the second to last band to perform at the festival (with only Texas to follow) and were given significant acclaim for their performance on the main stage.

The Side have also performed at festivals in Moscow, Russia; the Netherlands; and Cannes, France, not to mention a main stage appearance at their local festivals Belladrum and Rockness.

== Discography ==
- The Side (EP, 2005)
- Sunrise (EP, 2006)
- Forever Changing (EP, 2007)
- Top of the World (EP, 2008)
- Nowhere Left To Run (2009)
- Starting Over (2016)
