= Land (worship band) =

Scottish folk music band

- Origin: Glasgow, Scotland
- Genres: Folk, folk rock, roots rock
- Years active: 1997–2000
- Past members: Steve Knott; Yvonne Whitty; Diane MacLeod; Shirley-Anne Nolan

Land was a Scottish band who played folk music with folk rock and roots rock elements. They were a four-piece band from Glasgow, Scotland, where they released three independently made albums.

== Background ==
The Glasgow band was a four-piece ensemble, comprising Steve Knott, Yvonne Whitty, Diane MacLeod and Shirley-Anne Nolan.

== Music history ==
The group formed in 1997, with their first album, Down the Mountain Slowly, released the same year. Their subsequent album, Rain in the Springtime, was released the following year, in 1998. They released Point Me to the Skies, their final album, in 1999, before they disbanded the following year.

== Members ==
Members

- Steve Knott
- Yvonne Whitty
- Diane MacLeod
- Shirley-Anne Nolan

== Discography ==
Albums

- Down the Mountain Slowly (1997)
- Rain in the Springtime (1998)
- Point Me to the Skies (1999)
