= Sandy Kilpatrick =

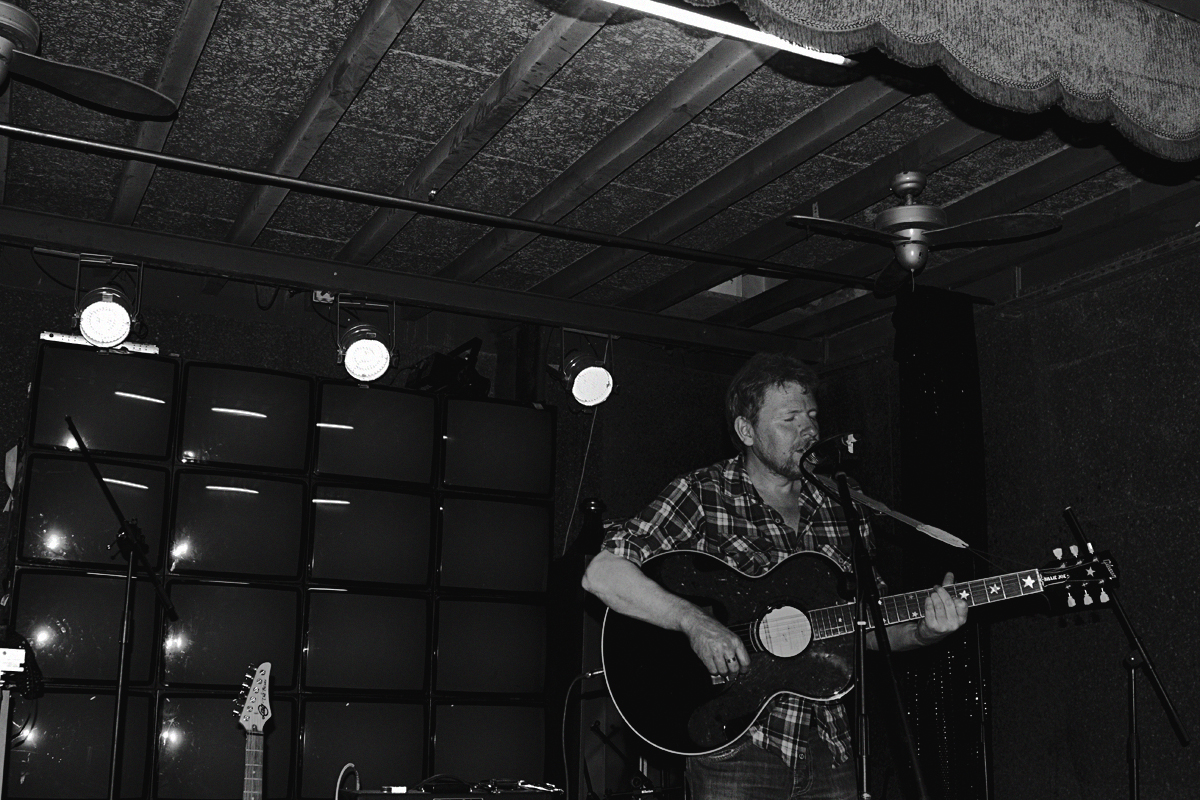

Background information
- Born: Alexander Drennan Kilpatrick
- Origin: East Kilbride, Scotland
- Genres: Indie folk, folk rock, soulful
- Years active: 1999–present
- Label: Ugly Man Records
- Website: sandykilpatrick.com

Sandy Kilpatrick is a Scottish singer-songwriter. He was born in East Kilbride, Scotland, in 1968. From 1995 to 2000 he was based in Manchester as frontman of the band Sleepwalker.

Since 2000 Kilpatrick has been living in the north of Portugal.

== History ==
Sandy Kilpatrick was born in Scotland. Since moving to Portugal at the end of 2000, he has released "Am I Welcome Here", "Incandescent Night Stories", "The Ballad of the Stark Miner", "Terras Últimas" and "Redemption Road".

Latest EP Your Love is a Weapon was released on 25 November 2013.

Kilpatrick lives and works in the small town of Vila Nova de Famalicão in the north of Portugal.

=== Redemption Road ===
Redemption Road was inspired by a gospel choir in New York, largely created during an artistic residency in the Monastery of Tibães, in Portugal, where it was launched officially on 21 July 2012. It was mastered in Abbey Road Studios in London by Sean Magee. The singles released were "I Like How it Feels", "We Don't Need Tomorrow" and "Wilderness Gone".

The album has been given coverage by Guy Garvey on BBC Radio 6 and by Mark Radcliffe on BBC Radio 2.

Wilderness Gone videoclip was chosen to be featured in P3, Portuguese newspaper Público (Portugal)'s online platform.

Song "I Like How it Feels", the first single to be released from Redemption Road, was chosen at the end of 2013 as the soundtrack for Cristiano Ronaldo's New Year video.

== Discography ==
Studio albums

- Incandescent Night Stories (2005)
- Terras Últimas (2010)
- Redemption Road (2012)

EPs

- Am I Welcome Here (2003)
- The Ballad of The Stark Miner (2007)
- Your Love is a Weapon (2013)

7" vinyl single

- Sleepwalking (2000)

Compilation

- À Sombra de Deus Vol.3 (2004)
- Sintra Misty 2010 (2010)
- Sintra Misty 2011 (2011)
