= Captain Face =

Scottish rock band

- Origin: Aberdeen, Scotland
- Genres: Rock
- Years active: 2003–2010
- Labels: Fat Hippy Records
- Members: Euan Wemyss; Lee 'the tenderness' Morrison; Dave Liddell; Sep Moore; Joe Brew
- Website: www.myspace.com/captainface

Captain Face are a Scottish rock band formed in 2003 in Aberdeen, Scotland. The band consists of Euan Wemyss (vocals), Lee 'the tenderness' Morrison (lead guitar), David Liddell (rhythm guitar), Joseph 'Sep' Moore (bass guitar) and Jonathan 'Joe' Brew (drums).

== History ==
=== Formation and early years (2003–2011) ===
The band's original line-up came together in the later part of 2003, and consisted of Lee 'the tenderness' Morrison (guitar), Joe Brew (drums), Dave Liddell (bass guitar) & Duncan Taylor (vocals/keyboards). Liddell soon moved to rhythm guitar duties after Brew recruited former colleague Joseph 'Sep' Moore to take over bass duties at the beginning of 2004. After only a few months the band parted company with Taylor due to "creative & personal differences". The remaining quartet continued to rehearse, mainly writing instrumental music. At the beginning of 2005 the band recruited vocalist Euan Wemyss, with whom Morrison had previously collaborated in the bands 'My Everyday' and 'Lynas'. The band's line-up remained unchanged until they played their last gig in 2010.

=== Kinmundy ===
Captain Face claim to hail from "the mythical land of Kinmundy, Aberdeenshire" portraying this location as a fictional land of strange occurrences. Although there is a village and various other properties bearing the name of Kinmundy in the Aberdeenshire area, the band actually took the name from a water pumping facility close to the village of Newmachar. Captain Face are in fact based in Aberdeen itself, with Lee, Dave, Joe & Euan coming from the Dyce area of the city. Sep is originally from the Scottish West coast town of Greenock.

=== Live performances ===
Captain Face play the majority of their gigs in their hometown of Aberdeen, but have also toured frequently around Scotland, playing venues in Edinburgh, Glasgow, Inverness, Perth and various other small towns. The band also toured the Devon area of England in 2007 with fellow Aberdeen rockers Hot Mangu.

=== Studio recordings ===
In the Autumn of 2005 Captain Face were invited to record a song for Aberdeen label Fat Hippy Records ' "Fat Hippy Sampler Vol. I" compilation, featuring a mix of experienced and emerging bands from the North-East of Scotland. The band recorded one of the earliest songs they had written, "Welcome To Kinmundy", and having suitably impressed Fat Hippy the band then released their debut EP "BOOM" through the label in July 2006. The band also recorded "The Return Of Horace Batchelor" for the label's "Fat Hippy Sampler Vol. II". 2007 saw the release of three singles - "Awesome! No Way!" (April), "Small Joy" (June) and "100% CRAD" (October). In 2008 the band recorded "Glittermyne II - The Glittering" for the label's "Fat Hippy Sampler Vol. III", and also their first Christmas song, the topically titled "Credit Crunch Christmas". Released on a limited scale by the band themselves, with proceeds going to charity, the disc was only available at live shows.

=== 'Live' versus 'Recorded' music ===
While Captain Face have been praised for their entertaining live shows, it has been noted by some that their music does not seem to have the same impact when heard on studio recordings. The band's approach to creating original music has been applauded, but it is also seen to sometimes split audiences. As such Captain Face's offerings aren't typically deemed very radio-friendly, however the band have had exposure on various FM and internet radio stations.

=== Media Exposure ===
Captain Face's singles "Small Joy" and "100% Crad" have been played by DJ Vic Galloway on BBC Radio 1, the U.K's most high-profile radio station. The band have been interviewed and have had songs played on local radio stations Original 106 (Aberdeen), Shmu FM (Aberdeen) and Northsound 1 (N.E Scotland), also performing live in the studio for that station's 'Sunday Session' programme.

A preview piece on the 2007 Scottish Parliament Election for STV North's North Tonight programme (where front-man Euan Wemyss works) featured the band's first single release "Awesome! No Way!".

=== Break-up and final gig ===
Due to Joe Brew's upcoming relocation to his wife's native Finland, Captain Face would be left needing a new drummer. However, after much discussion it was decided that it was time for the band to end.

The band played together for the final time at an intimate show for friends and family at Captain Tom's studio, Aberdeen on 19 December 2010.

== Discography ==
=== EPs ===
| Year | Title |
|---|---|
| 2006 | "BOOM" |

=== Singles ===
| Year | Title | Album |
|---|---|---|
| 2007 | "Awesome! No Way!" | Non-album singles |
| 2007 | "Small Joy" | Non-album singles |
| 2007 | "100% CRAD" | Non-album singles |
| 2008 | "Credit Crunch Christmas" | Non-album singles |
