= Euan Wemyss =

Euan Wemyss is currently a singer and was previously a Scottish broadcast journalist working for STV News in the Northern Scotland.

Wemyss, the lead singer of Aberdeen rock band, Captain Face, used to also contribute to the music section of the station's website, stv.tv.

From June 2008, Wemyss was an occasional presenter of short news bulletins and a reporter for North Tonight on STV. In August 2009, he moved to STV Central in Glasgow to become the dedicated reporter for the "North" section of the STV News website. Wemyss then moved back to STV North in Aberdeen.
