= Roy Moller =

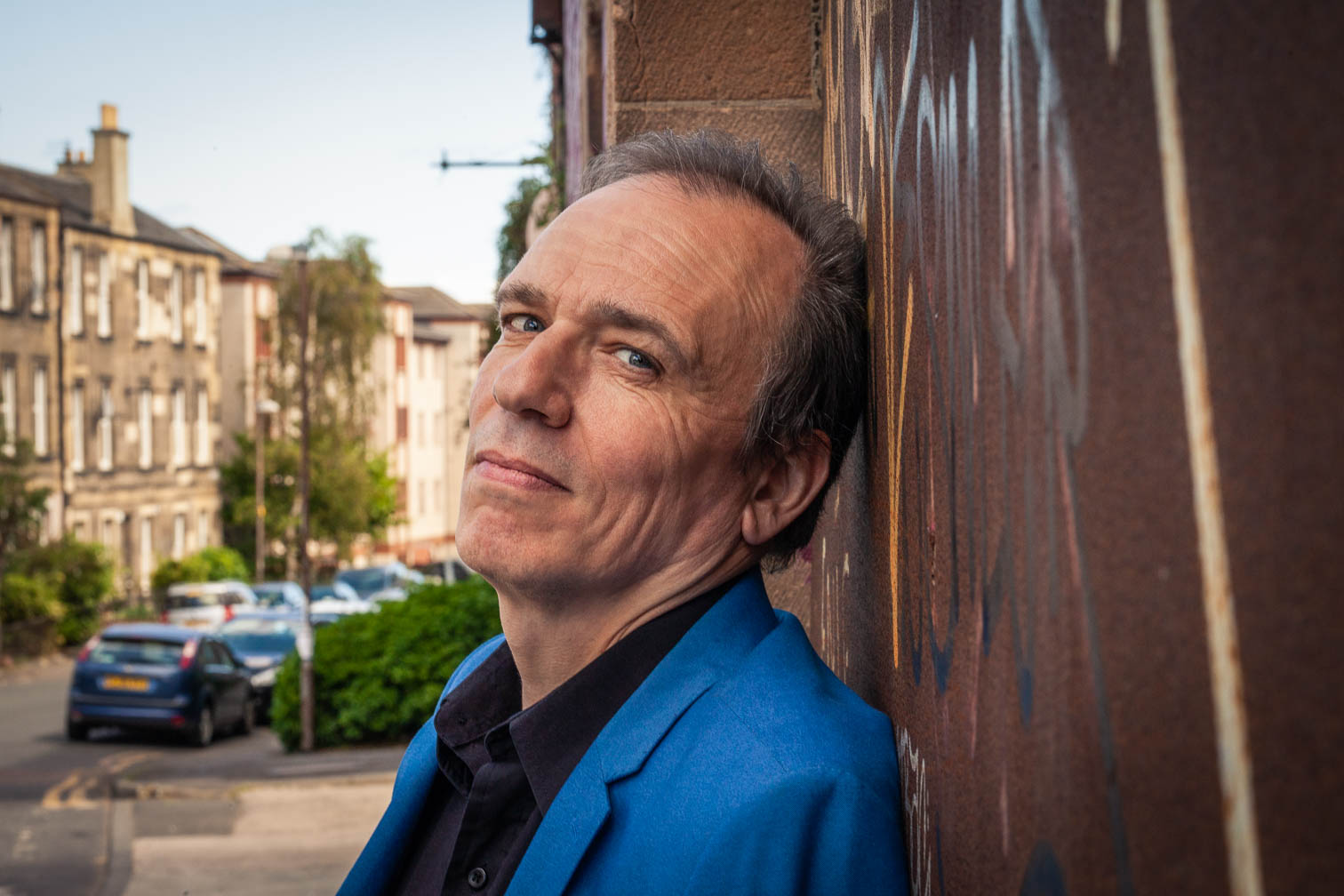

Background information
- Also known as: Roy Møller
- Born: 3 July 1963 (age 62); Edinburgh
- Website: roymoller.bandcamp.com

Roy Moller is a Scottish singer, songwriter and poet. He was born in Edinburgh in 1963; his parents were from Toronto in Canada, and he was adopted soon after birth. His early musical influences included Elvis Presley, Joy Division, The Fall, Ivor Cutler and David Bowie. He attended Trinity Academy, then moved to Glasgow where he studied English at the University of Strathclyde. While there, he won the Keith Wright Poetry Competition.

Moller played in bands including Meth O.D. and The Wow Kafe. His first solo work was 2003's "Maximum Smile". He has collaborated with Stevie Jackson from Belle and Sebastian in a band called the Store Keys. He played with Davy Henderson in the band Jesus, Baby! When Marc Riley interviewed him on BBC Radio in 2011, he called Moller "Scotland's best-kept secret".

In 2008, Moller had a son with wife Emma, named Peter. In 2013, Moller moved to Dunbar. In 2014 he took My Week Beats Your Year, his musical tribute to Lou Reed, to the Edinburgh Festival Fringe; Gus Ironside called it "witty, mesmerising and highly poignant". In the same year his poetry debut Imports was published by Appletree Writers Press, and his album One Domino was called "intoxicating and compulsively habit-forming".

Moller has been involved in the Dunbar CoastWord Festival, and with Neu!Reekie! He contributed a poem to The Sea, a 2015 anthology to raise funds for the Royal National Lifeboat Institution. Louder Than War called There's A Thousand Untold Stories (2016) "a tour de force of sparkling lo-fi gems". In 2017 he performed Redemptions, an evening of poetry and song, with Paul Hullah and Martin Metcalfe, at the Scottish Poetry Library. In 2019, Dionysia Press published Moller's poetry collection about his birth and adoption, "Be My Baby" Later that year, he returned to music, by releasing a single, Semicolon with the Chain Pier Group.

Moller's musical work has been compared to Julian Cope, Vic Godard, and Iggy Pop. He is dyspraxic, and believes his experience of dyspraxia has influenced his work.

He is a supporter of Tottenham Hotspur F.C.

== Discography ==
- Speak When I'm Spoken To (2006)
- Playing Songs No One's Listening To (2011)
- The Singing's Getting Better (with Sporting Hero, 2012)
- One Domino (2014)
- My Week Beats Your Year (2014)
- There's A Thousand Untold Stories (2016)
- There's A Thousand More Untold Stories (2016)
