= Catherine MacLeod =

Scottish Gaelic singer and schoolteacher

- Born: 4 September 1914
- Died: 7 May 2000 (aged 85)
- Education: University of Edinburgh
- Instrument: vocals
- Works: An Aitearachd Àrd; Òran Chaluim Sgàire
- Label: Parlophone

Catherine MacLeod (4 September 1914 – 7 May 2000), also known as Kitty MacLeod, and in Gaelic as Kitty NicLeòid, was a Scottish Gaelic singer and school teacher.

== Biography ==
MacLeod was born to Scottish parents in Kasuali, India, 4 September 1914. Her mother, Anna MacLeod, was a school teacher, and her father, Kenneth MacLeod was a British soldier serving with the Seaforth Highlanders during the First World War. After Catherine MacLeod was born, her father went "missing in action" and Anna MacLeod moved with her daughter back to the Isle Of Lewis in Scotland, where the young Catherine began her education at the Lionel School. Kenneth MacLeod reappeared two years afterwards, and recovered his faculties when he was brought back to Scotland and reunited with his daughter. Catherine MacLeod learnt Gaelic from her mother, but also from participating in local ceilidh gatherings in which people shared regional folklore. Her community at that time was largely monolingual.

She then attended the University of Edinburgh via a scholarship. At University she won gold medals for Celtic and Moral philosophy, as well as the Elizabeth Hamilton Prize for the best woman student in philosophy. While studying, she participated at the singing competition of the Royal National Mòd of 1936 in Inverness and won the gold medal.

MacLeod was a school teacher both in Scotland and England until she retired in 1974. During that time she also pursued a singing career, with early recordings with Parlophone. She avoided the commercial industry, but continued to sing in concerts, such as the People's Festival Ceilidhs, which emerged from the Edinburgh Festival Fringe. She was known for her recordings of An Aitearachd Àrd ("The high swelling of the sea") and Òran Chaluim Sgàire, which she also composed. She also appeared in The Western Isles, the first Scottish color documentary, and with her sister in the film Rob Roy, the Highland Rogue.

MacLeod was married to Murdoch Dubh MacLennan and then to Ernest Renaud Lewtas Gregson.
