= Mercury Tilt Switch =

Scottish rock band

Mercury Tilt Switch was a rock band from Dundee, Scotland. They formed at the city's university, going through various line-up changes before settling on their current roster in 2001.

The band has undertaken several tours of the UK and Republic of Ireland, and have released two full-length albums, 2002's Brundle Kid and 2006's Kiprono, to critical acclaim. Touring partners of the band have included Snow Patrol, Deftones, Biffy Clyro, Hell is for Heroes, Mclusky, and Aereogramme.

The band is currently signed to Pet Piranha Records. All live and work in Dundee.
