= Under the Dome (band) =

Ambient music band from Scotland

Under the Dome are an ambient music band from Scotland. They have put out several albums and also appeared on a live concert album with other similar musicians, with their debut album appearing in 1998.

The group is based around the twin synthesisers of Colin Anderson and Grant Middleton.

== Discography ==
- The Demon Haunted World (1998)
- Concerts at Jodrell Bank (2000) (live, with Radio Massacre International, Arcane, and Paul Nagle)
- Bellerophon (2002)
- Colin Woz Ere (2003)
- Over The Pond (2003) (live in studio at Radio WXPN, Philadelphia)
- Wot No Colin? (2003) (live. Colin Anderson not present; Band consisted of Grant Middleton, Paul Nagle, Andy Bloyce, and Steve Jenkins)
- Dome Roots Collection (2004)
- Live @ HJ7 (2008)
- Almagest (2020)
