= Pearl and the Puppets =

Scottish indie pop band

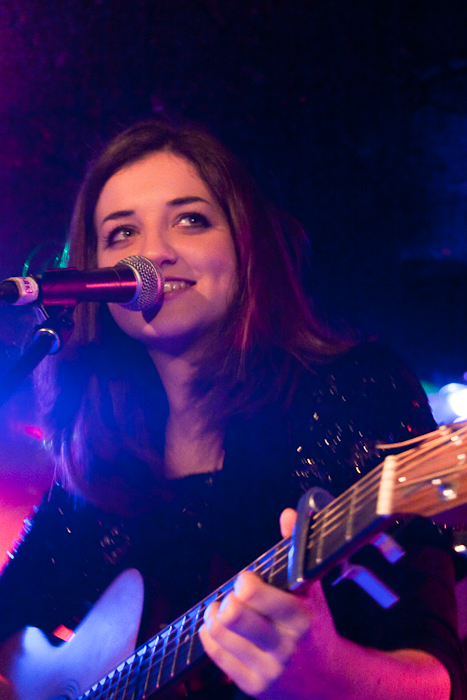
- Katie "Pearl" Sutherland performing in Glasgow, 2009

Background information
- Origin: Kirkintilloch, Dunbartonshire, Scotland
- Genres: Indie pop Acoustic; Folk
- Years active: 2007–2011
- Labels: Universal Republic
- Members: Katie Sutherland; Blair McMillan; Gordon Turner; Scott Clark; Michael Abubakar
- Website: www.pearlandthepuppets.com

Pearl and the Puppets was a band from Kirkintilloch, East Dunbartonshire in Scotland. The band comprised singer-songwriter Katie Sutherland (vocals/guitar), Blair McMillan (drums), Gordon Turner (guitar), Scott Clark (bass) and Michael Abubakar (keyboard).

Sutherland's voice has been described as being similar to that of Regina Spektor and Dolores O'Riordan.

== Musical career ==
Pearl and the Puppets were signed to the Universal Republic record label and headlined the Solus Tent at the Wickerman Festival, in Scotland.

=== Appearances ===
On 5 June 2009, Pearl appeared on STV's The Hour promoting her upcoming gigs. Five days later, the band supported Elton John at Glasgow's SEC Centre.

On 31 December 2009, Pearl and the Puppets played on BBC One Scotland's Hogmanay Live and went on to perform on the main stage at RockNess in June 2010.

On 23 August 2010 they supported The Hoosiers at the HMV Picture House in Edinburgh.

They appeared at the SECC, Glasgow, on 19 November 2010 as part of the Children in Need appeal.

On 2 December 2011, Katie Sutherland announced that she will no longer release music under the Pearl & The Puppets name, but under her own name.

=== Featured songs ===
In 2008, the band's song "Because I Do" was featured on a Vodafone advertisement in Australia and New Zealand

Their song "Make Me Smile" was featured in a Victoria's Secret advertisement in the US and an Orange advertisement in Romania in March 2010.
