= List of bands and musicians from Glasgow =

This list contains famous or notable musicians, singers, composers and bands who originated in or are associated strongly with Glasgow, Scotland.

== 0–9 ==
- 1990s

== A ==
- AC Acoustics
- Admiral Fallow
- Adopted as Holograph
- Adventures in Stereo
- Aereogramme
- Aerials Up
- The Almighty
- Altered Images
- Angel Heart
- Craig Armstrong, composer
- Attic Lights
- The Alleged

== B ==
- Baby Chaos (briefly changed name to Deckard)
- Baby Strange
- A Band Called Quinn
- Jimmy Barnes, singer, member of Cold Chisel
- The Bathers
- Beecake
- Beggars Opera
- Maggie Bell, singer, member of Stone the Crows
- Belle & Sebastian
- Bis
- Bleed From Within
- The Blimp
- The Blue Nile
- The Bluebells
- Bombay Talkie
- Brian Robertson, guitarist, former member of Thin Lizzy
- Scott Brown, DJ and music producer
- Jack Bruce, singer, bassist, member of Cream

== C ==
- Camera Obscura
- Junior Campbell, also member of The Marmalade
- Cannon
- Lewis Capaldi, singer-songwriter
- Cado Belle
- Charlie and the Bhoys
- Chvrches
- The Cinematics
- Gerry Cinnamon, singer-songwriter, guitarist
- The Clutha, folk group
- Billy Connolly, actor, musician, comedian
- Ivor Cutler, poet, singer, musician, writer

== D ==
- Dananananaykroyd
- Darius Campbell Danesh, singer-songwriter, actor and film producer
- Deacon Blue
- Dead Pony, formerly known as Crystal
- Del Amitri
- The Delgados
- Jimmy Dewar, bassist, vocalist, member of Robin Trower band
- Jim Diamond, singer-songwriter
- George Donaldson, member of Celtic Thunder
- Donovan, musician, songwriter, record producer

== E ==
- El Presidente
- Endgames
- Errors

== F ==
- Franz Ferdinand
- The Fratellis
- Future Pilot A.K.A.

== G ==
- Ganger
- Bobby Gillespie, singer-songwriter
- Glasgow
- Glasvegas
- Clare Grogan, singer and actress, member of Altered Images
- Gun

== H ==
- H_{2}O
- Alex Harvey, frontman of The Sensational Alex Harvey Band
- Fran Healy, singer, member of Travis
- Joe "Mr Piano" Henderson, pianist, composer and broadcaster
- Hip Parade
- Hipsway
- How to Swim
- RM Hubbert, guitarist and singer
- Michael Hunter, music games composer

== J ==
- Jacob Yates and the Pearly Gate Lock Pickers
- Bert Jansch, folk musician, founding member of Pentangle

== K ==
- Konflict, Kemal and Rob Data, Drum & Bass producers
- David Knopfler, guitarist, member of Dire Straits
- Mark Knopfler, singer, songwriter, guitarist, member of Dire Straits
- Oliver Knussen, classical composer and conductor
- Kode9
- Jim Kerr, member of Simple Minds

== L ==
- Laki Mera
- Jeanie Lambe, jazz singer
- Frederic Lamond, classical pianist and pupil of Franz Liszt
- Mary Lee, singer, variety performer
- Life Without Buildings
- The Light (Burn1)
- Little Eye
- Lloyd Cole and the Commotions
- Logan
- Loki, rapper
- Lotus Eater
- Love and Money
- Lucia & The Best Boys

== M ==
- Makethisrelate
- Man Must Die
- The Marmalade
- Helen Marnie of Ladytron
- John Martyn
- David McCallum, Sr., violinist
- Jimmy McCulloch, rock musician
- Johnny McElhone, member of Altered Images, Hipsway, and Texas
- Matt McGinn, folk musician
- Lisa McHugh, singer
- Frankie Miller, singer-songwriter and actor
- Middle of the Road
- Mogwai
- Hudson Mohawke, producer, composer and DJ
- Mother and the Addicts
- Jim Mullen, jazz guitarist

== N ==
- Natural Acoustic Band
- No Way Sis

== O ==
- One Dove
- One in a Million
- Orange Juice
- The Orchids

== P ==
- The Pastels
- The Phantom Band
- Owen Paul, singer, songwriter, musician
- The Poets
- Emma Pollock, singer-songwriter, composer, founding member of The Delgados
- El Presidente
- PAWS (band)
- Prides
- Primal Scream

== R ==
- Chris Rainbow, pop/rock singer, musician
- Eddi Reader, member of Fairground Attraction
- Maggie Reilly, singer, member of Cado Belle
- Remember Remember
- Rustie, musician, producer
- William Reid, member of The Jesus and Mary Chain

== S ==
- Shop Assistants
- Sensational Alex Harvey Band
- Set the Tone
- Shitdisco
- The Silencers
- Simple Minds
- Slam
- Slik
- David Sneddon
- Jimmy Somerville, singer, member of Bronski Beat and the Communards
- Sons and Daughters
- SOPHIE
- Spirea X
- Spit Back
- Sharleen Spiteri, singer, songwriter, guitarist, member of Texas
- Sparrow and the Workshop
- Sputniks Down
- Stapleton
- Al Stewart
- Stone the Crows
- Strawberry Switchblade
- Hamish Stuart, member of The Average White Band
- The Supernaturals
- Swanee

== T ==
- Trashcan Sinatras
- Soom T, reggae singer and rapper
- Teenage Fanclub
- Telstar Ponies
- Texas
- Dougie Thomson, bassist, member of Supertramp
- Travis
- Twin Atlantic

== U ==
- Uncle John & Whitelock
- Unkle Bob
- Midge Ure, singer, songwriter, member of Slik, Thin Lizzy, Rich Kids, Visage, and Ultravox
- Urusei Yatsura

== V ==
- The Vaselines
- Vipera

== W ==
- The Wake
- Bobby Wellins, tenor saxophonist
- Eric Woolfson, songwriter, producer, pianist, member of the Alan Parsons Project
- Warzone

== Y ==
- Yashin
- Alexander Young, singer, songwriter, manager, producer, member of Grapefruit
- Angus Young, Scottish-born Australian guitarist, member of AC/DC
- George Young, Scottish-born Australian guitarist, member of The Easybeats
- John Paul Young, Scottish-born Australian singer
- Malcolm Young, Scottish-born Australian guitarist, member of AC/DC
- Stevie Young, guitarist, member of Starfighters and AC/DC

== Z ==
- Zoey Van Goey

== See also ==
- List of people from Glasgow
- List of Scottish musicians
