= Proximity effect =

Proximity effect may refer to:

- Proximity effect (atomic physics)
- Proximity effect (audio), an increase in bass or low frequency response when a sound source is close to a microphone
- Proximity Effect (comics), a comic book series written by Scott Tucker and Aron Coleite
- Proximity effect (electromagnetism), magnetically induced current distortions resulting in increased effective resistance of a conductor
- Proximity effect (electron beam lithography), a phenomenon in electron beam lithography (EBL)
- Proximity effect (superconductivity), a term used in the field of superconductivity
- The Proximity Effect (Nada Surf album), 1998
- The Proximity Effect (Laki Mera album), 2011

== See also ==
- Pressure sensitive (disambiguation)
