= Whitey discography =

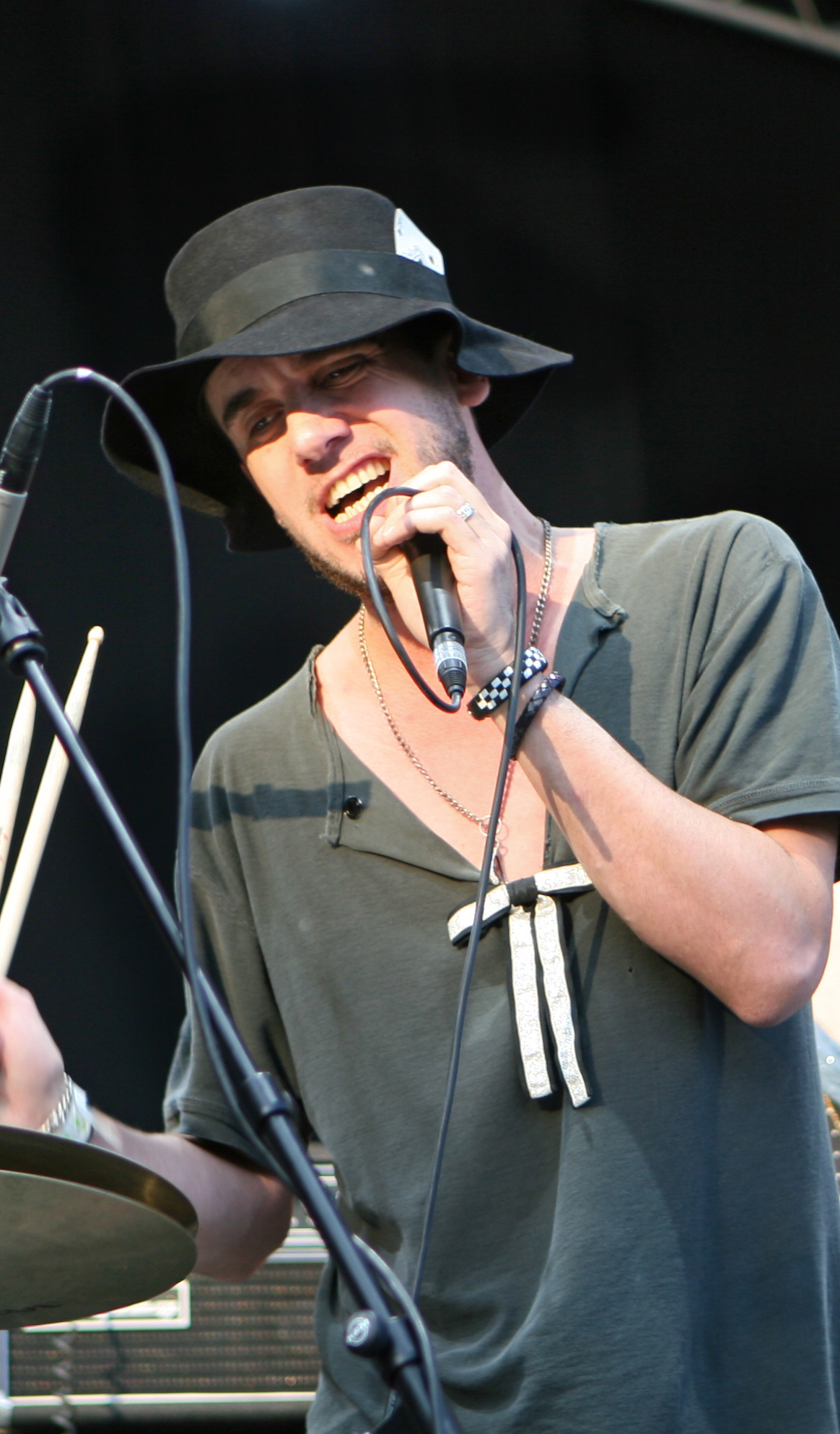
- Whitey in 2008
- Studio albums: 7
- EPs: 3
- Compilation albums: 5
- Singles: 14
- Music videos: 3

The discography of British singer-songwriter Whitey consists of seven studio albums, three extended plays, fourteen singles and three music videos. As a producer Whitey also has several remixes and songs made.

Making his debut as solo singer in 2003, during the last twenty years Whitey had passed through several music labels, ending up as an independent musician, who creates and sells recordings by himself. Due to the lack of promotion almost all his releases were not represented in any major chart, except the "Non Stop / A Walk in the Dark" single, which peaked at number 67 in the UK Singles Chart in 2005.

== Albums ==
=== Studio albums ===
Title	Album details
The Light at the End of the Tunnel Is a Train	Released: 21 March 2005; Label: 1234, Dim Mak Records, NO! Label; Formats: CD, LP, digital download
Canned Laughter	Released: 1 April 2010; Label: Spoilt, NO! Label; Formats: digital download, CD, LP
Great Shakes Volume 1 (also simply known as "Great Shakes")	Released: 23 March 2012 (leaked circa 2007); Label: self-released, NO! Label; Formats: digital download, CD, LP
Great Shakes Volume 2	Released: 23 March 2012; Label: self-released, NO! Label; Formats: digital download, CD, LP
Lost Summer	Released: 19 May 2012; Label: self-released, NO! Label; Formats: digital download, CD, LP
Seven	Released: 1 March 2015; Label: self-released, NO! Label; Formats: digital download, CD, LP
Now That's Why I Killed Music	Released: 7 August 2020; Label: NO! Label; Formats: digital download, CD, LP
Nothing in My Pocket but a Hole	Released: 3 May 2024; Label: NO! Label / Amplify Music; Formats: digital download, CD, LP
Mental Radio	Released: 3 October 2024; Label: NO! Label / Amplify Music; Formats: digital download, CD, LP

=== Compilation albums ===
Title	Album details
Lost Songs Volume 1: Berlin	Released: 22 December 2020; Label: NO! Label; Formats: digital download
Lost Songs Volume 2: Bohemia Road	Released: 10 March 2021; Label: NO! Label; Formats: digital download
Lost Songs Volume 3: Wrong Destination	Released: 25 June 2021; Label: NO! Label; Formats: digital download
Lost Songs Volume 4: 2003-2021	Released: 5 August 2021; Label: NO! Label; Formats: digital download
Let's Never Go Home Again (Lost Songs 5)	Released: 15 April 2023; Label: NO! Label; Formats: digital download
Life Support (Lost Songs 6)	Released: 24 November 2024; Label: NO! Label; Formats: digital download

=== Canceled albums ===
- Stay on the Outside (2008)
- Bare Bones (2013)
- Pick Up Your Shadow (2015)
- Square Peg, Round World (2015)
- A Riot on Memory Lane (2021)

== Extended plays ==
Title	EP details
Wrap It Up	Released: 9 October 2007; Label: Nitrus; Formats: digital download
Made of Night	Released: 21 February 2008; Label: Marquis Cha Cha; Formats: Vinyl, CD
The Times They Are Deranging	Released: 25 October 2020; Label: NO! Label; Formats: digital download, cassette

== Singles ==
List of singles, with selected chart positions, showing year released and album name
Title	Year	Peaks	Album
Title	Year	UK	Album
"Why You Have To Be Me" (retitled "Y.U.H.2.B.M.2")	2003	—	The Light at the End of the Tunnel Is a Train
"Leave Them All Behind"	2003	165	The Light at the End of the Tunnel Is a Train
"Non Stop / A Walk in the Dark"	2005	67	The Light at the End of the Tunnel Is a Train
"Wrap It Up"	2006	—	Great Shakes Volume 1
"Individuals"	2008	—	Great Shakes Volume 2
"Saturday Night Ate Our Lives"	2012	—	Lost Summer
"No More Right Or Wrong"	2012	—	Non-album single
"Waves of Fear"	2013	—	Non-album single
"Somebody, Grab the Wheel"	2015	—	Now That's Why I Killed Music (originally Pick Up Your Shadow)
"The Other Way"	2015	—	Lost Songs Volume 2: Bohemia Road
"Pick Up Your Shadow"	2015	—	Now That's Why I Killed Music
"Civilizashun" (retitled "Civilizashun Part 2")	2015	—	Now That's Why I Killed Music
"In the End"	2015	—	Now That's Why I Killed Music
"People"	2020	—	Lost Summer
"—" denotes a recording that did not chart or was not released in that territory.

== Videography ==
=== Music videos ===
Title	Year
"Non Stop" (with live backing band)	2005
"Wrap It Up"	2008
"People"	2020

== Other appearances ==
=== Compilation albums ===
Title	Year	Album
"Y.U.H.2.B.M.2"	2002	Sonic Mook Experiment's Future Rock 'n' Roll
"Twoface"	2003	Sonic Mook Experiment's Hot Shit
"Leave Them All Behind"	2005	Modular Presents: Leave Them All Behind
"Stay on the Outside"	2007	Kitsuné Maison Compilation 4

=== Production ===
Title	Year	Claimed as	Artist(s)
Life (EP)	1991	Writer	Vibe Tribe (Note: Whitey was one of the members.)
Spice of Life (EP)	1992	Writer	Global Method
Good Livin' Platter	1997	Backing singer	The Junkyard Dogs
"Slimcea Girl" (The Fat Boy Dub)	1997	Guitarist	Mono
Cut Loose Howling	1998	Designer	Deadfall
I Got a Brand New Egg Layin' Machine	2005	Additional personnel	Goon Moon
"Hanging Around"	2005	Bassist	Le Volume Courbe
"Paint It Red"	2005	Composer, backing singer	Royal Appointment (featuring Coco Electrik)

=== Remixes ===
Title	Year	Artist(s)
"San Trancisco"	1994	Punchunella
"Any Minute Now"	2004	Soulwax
"Me & My Man"	2004	Chromeo
"Red Blooded Woman"	2004	Kylie Minogue
"Coochie Coo"	2005	Princess Superstar
"Going Nowhere"	2005	Cut Copy
"Helicopter"	2005	Bloc Party
"Okay"	2005	The Sexmachines
"Pulsatron"	2005	Siobhan Fahey
"Vote Whitey"	2005	Drinkme
"Bleep #1"	2007	MOTOR
"Second Life"	2008	Gang of Four
