= The Ferry Boat Inn =

Former pub in Norwich, England

Coordinates: 52.6227°N 1.3035°E

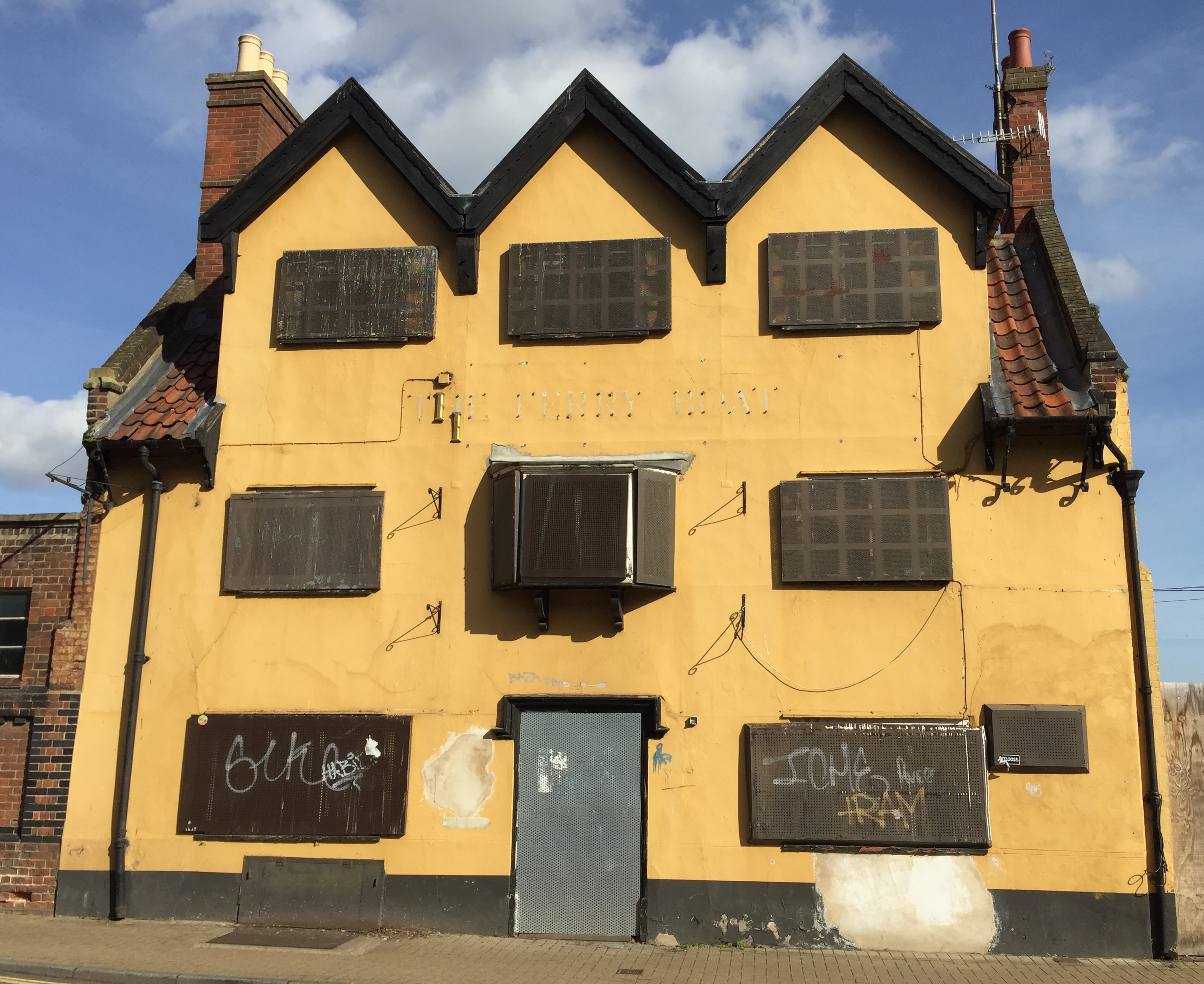
The Ferry Boat Inn

The Ferry Boat Inn was a public house and 150-capacity live music venue in Norwich, England, which closed in 2006.

== History ==
The history of the Ferry Boat has been traced as far back as 1822, when it is thought to have been called the Horse Packet. It was known as the Steam Barge by 1830, and in 1867 its name was changed to the Steam Packet. It was first known as the Ferry Boat in 1925.

In the mid 1970s a second bar was opened in a converted boat shed at the rear of the pub. It was here that the pub began putting on live music. The Ferry Boat was originally a venue for cover bands, but in the late 1990s local promoters began booking their own nights at the venue to put on local originals bands, and touring bands from all over the world. Over the next few years the Ferry Boat became established as one of the most important venues for local bands, catering for all types of alternative music, with a leaning towards punk rock, ska punk, metal, hardcore and Post-rock.

The serial killer Steve Wright was landlord of the pub in 1988.

In 2005 a protest was held after the Ferry Boat faced losing its public entertainment licence due to noise complaints from residents of a newly built block of flats nearby. The protest was a success, and the Ferry Boat's licence was renewed. However the Ferry Boat was forced to close a year later in 2006 due to continued noise complaints and financial difficulty. The final gig was an all-day-long event featuring local bands with Norwich based five-piece Dragline closing the night to a sweaty room packed to full capacity.

== Present ==
The Ferry Boat Inn is currently closed. In January 2010, the site was sold to the Borthwick family, who received planning permission to build Norwich Backpackers on the site. The development would include a micro pub as part of the building, along with a cafe overlooking the river and a cycle and canoe storage barn.

In June 2014, it was reported that the Ferry Boat Inn had been sold for "more than £500,000", and that it might be turned into a residential development. A representative for the estate agents that handled the sale stated that it would not be a backpackers' site and that the new owners would "probably be looking for other, denser uses for the site".

In 2019, the site was put up for sale again, and bought by property development company Estateducation for £1.2 million. In October 2020, work began to build 41 homes on the site, comprising 2 in the former pub building and 39 in a five-storey tower in the car park. Building works stopped in January 2022 after, according to Companies House, the main contractor, Devise Construction Ltd, was forced into receivership due to failure to pay back a Coronavirus Business Interruption loan. Progress was hampered further in July 2024 when the development company went into receivership.

=== Notable bands ===
The Ferry Boat's regular presence on tour schedules meant that many bands would pass through it before moving onto greater acclaim. Examples of bands and artists to have played the venue include:

- 65 Days of Static
- Bring Me the Horizon
- Cult of Luna
- Deaf Havana
- Enter Shikari
- Gallows
- Get Cape. Wear Cape. Fly
- Kimya Dawson
- Million Dead
- Sonic Boom Six
- Foals
- Chase & Status

Other notable bands include:
RX Bandits, The Aquabats, Minus the Bear, Noisettes, Bleeding Through, Brigade, Anti-Nowhere League, UK Subs, Demented Are Go, Throwdown, The Vibrators, Twin Zero, The Business, Captain Everything!, The Red Chord, HORSE the band, Bullet Union, Eden Maine, Fastlane, Seachange, Hoover, Even in Blackouts, Stretch Arm Strong, Jeniferever, Kid commando, The Dangerfields, Logh, The Good Life, Vanilla Sky, Modern Life Is War, Howards Alias, MU330, Stza Crack, Send More Paramedics, Strike Anywhere, The Robocop Kraus, Decibully, Chris T-T, Swearing at Motorists, The Martini Henry Rifles, Miss Black America, Melys, Engerica, Kinesis, KaitO, Meanwhile, Back In Communist Russia..., Sputniks Down, The Dawn Parade, Bearsuit, Angelspit, The Suffrajets, The Microphones, Karl Blau, Magoo, Herman Düne, We vs. Death, Koufax, Funeral Diner, Days in December, Jairus, Leatherface, Champion, The Juliana Theory, Koopa.
