= Adopted as Holograph (album) =

Studio album by Adopted as Holograph
- Released: January 2013
- Recorded: 2011/12; Green Door Studios (Glasgow, Scotland)
- Genre: Alternative rock, Baroque pop, Continental jazz
- Length: 23:12
- Label: Holograph Records
- Producer: Emily Maclaren, Stuart Evans, Sam Smith

Professional ratings
Review scores
Source	Rating
The List	3/5 stars

Adopted as Holograph is the eponymous debut studio album by Adopted as Holograph. Recorded in 2011/2012 at Green Door Studios in Glasgow, the album was released in January 2013.

== Track listing ==
No.	Title	Length
1.	"Barbarossa"	3:12
2.	"In Search of the Miraculous"	3:31
3.	"Dead at Eleven"	3:10
4.	"Nil By Mouth"	4:31
5.	"The Exquisite Corpse"	3:49
6.	"Peer Gynt"	2:23
7.	"The Animal Man"	2:45

== Personnel ==
- David Philp – Vocals, Guitars
- Andrew Gifford – Double bass, Backing vocals
- Tom Pettigrew – Violin
- Caroline Hussey – Accordion, Backing vocals
- Ryan Buchanan – Guitar, Backing vocals
- Chris Houston – Drums (tracks 1, 3–7)
- Iban Perez – Drums, Trumpet (track 2)
- Jamie Bolland – Metallophone (track 2)
- Engineers: Emily Maclaren, Stuart Evans
- Recorded at: Green Door Studios, Glasgow, Scotland
- Cover design: Adopted as Holograph
