= Hearts and Minds (Vietnam War) =

1960s US strategy popularised under President Lyndon B. Johnson

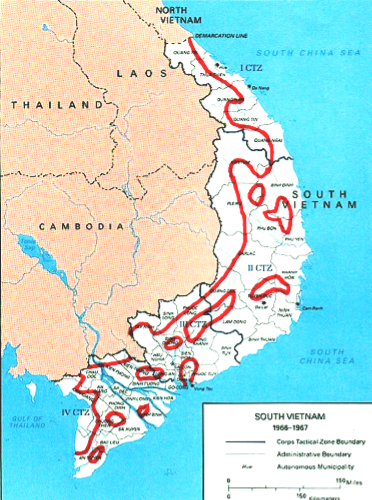
Approximate zones of control in South Vietnam at the time of the signing of the Paris Peace Accords, January 1973.

Hearts and Minds or winning hearts and minds refers to the strategy and programs used by the governments of South Vietnam and the United States during the Vietnam War to win the popular support of the Vietnamese people and to help defeat the Viet Cong insurgency. Pacification is the more formal term for winning hearts and minds. In this case, however, it was also defined as the process of countering the insurgency. Military, political, economic, and social means were used to attempt to establish or reestablish South Vietnamese government control over rural areas and people under the influence of the Viet Cong. Some progress was made in the 1967–1971 period by the joint military-civilian organization called CORDS, but the character of the war changed from a guerrilla war to a conventional war between the armies of South and North Vietnam. North Vietnam won in 1975.

Pacification or hearts and minds objectives were often in diametric opposition to the strategy of firepower, mobility, and attrition pursued by the U.S. from 1965 to 1968. Rather than the search and destroy strategy the U.S. followed during those years, hearts and minds had the priority of "hold and protect" the rural population and thereby gain its support for the government of South Vietnam.

== Malayan Emergency ==
The phrase "hearts and minds" was first used in the context of counter-insurgency warfare by British General Gerald Templer in February 1952. Speaking of the conflict known as the Malayan Emergency, Templer said that victory in the war "lies not in pouring more soldiers into the jungle, but in the hearts and minds of the Malayan people." The British in Malaysia, in addition to military actions against the communist guerrillas undertook a number of social and economic programs to protect the populace, isolate the rural population to reduce their supply and support of the insurgents, gather intelligence about the insurgents' organization and plans, and ensure that government services were provided to rural dwellers.

British action and policy in defeating the Malayan counter-insurgency became a paradigm for future struggles with insurgents, including the U.S. war in Vietnam. Critics have stated that the Malayan emergency was much simpler to combat than many insurgencies and that the impact of hearts and minds programs has often been over-stated.

== Ngo Dinh Diem's government ==
The nationalist President of South Vietnam, Ngo Dinh Diem, instituted a number of programs designed to halt the growing influence of the Viet Cong in the countryside. In 1959, Diem created the Agroville program which had the objective of moving peasants into fortified villages. The program failed due to the coercive and disruptive aspects of moving peasants from their homes and requiring them to construct new ones under the supervision of government officials. The Viet Cong harassed the agrovilles with terrorism and assassinations

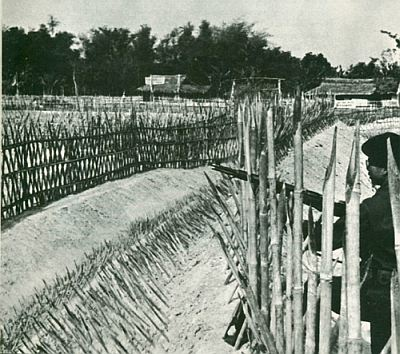
A strategic hamlet in South Vietnam c.1964

In 1961, the Diem government created the Strategic Hamlet Program, which differed from the Agrovilles in its emphasis on self-defense by the peasants in their fortified villages. The program in theory would prevent Viet Cong attacks by stationing South Vietnamese army (ARVN) units near the hamlets to respond quickly to threats. The strategic hamlet program was intended to gain support among the people for the government and to raise their standard of living. The program was implemented too rapidly and without popular support and many or most hamlets fell under Viet Cong control. The Strategic Hamlet Program effectively ended in November 1963 when the Diem government was overthrown by the army and Diem was killed. Most of the hamlets were subsequently abandoned and peasants moved back to their old homes.

The Strategic Hamlet Program highlighted the schism in U.S. policy that would continue throughout the Vietnam War. General Lionel C. McGarr, head of the Military Assistance Advisory Group (MAAG) in Vietnam objected to the program because it would create a static defense and tie down units of the ARVN. Conversely, the American Embassy believed that the mobile search and destroy missions by the ARVN as advocated by MAAG were only a preliminary measure to overcome the increasing Viet Cong control of the countryside.

Diem's government created two other hearts and minds programs. The Chieu Hoi program encouraged defections from the Viet Cong. Diem also bolstered the South Vietnamese police and intelligence agencies to disrupt the Viet Cong infrastructure by capturing, killing, or arresting key Viet Cong operatives.

The U.S. provided assistance for the operation of all these programs, but they were primarily the creation of the South Vietnamese.

== John F. Kennedy ==
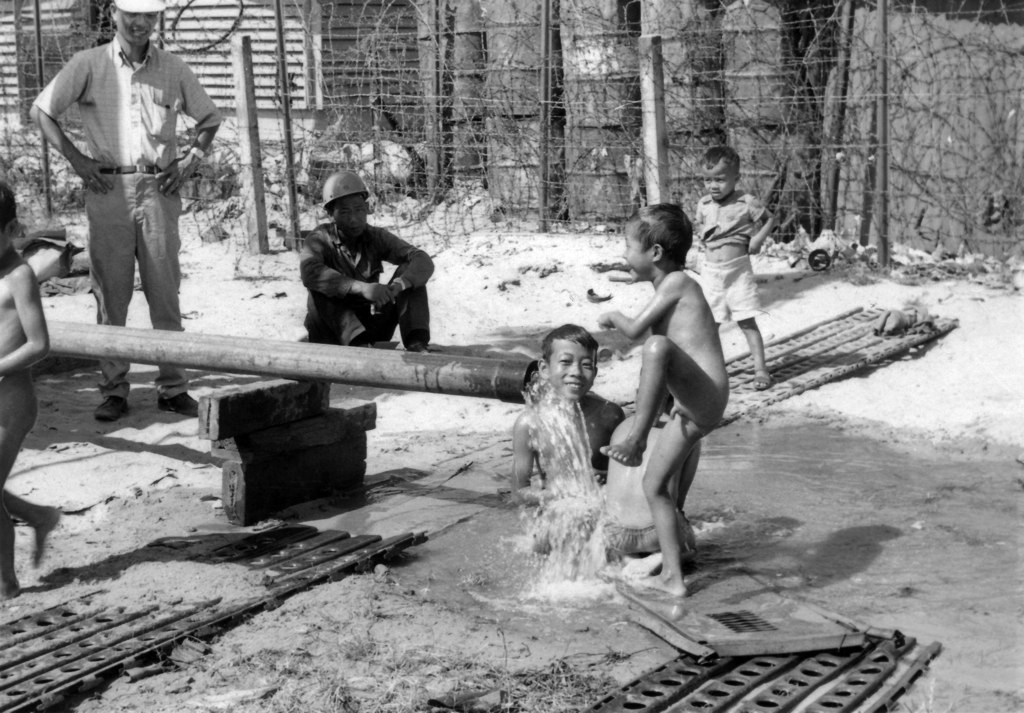
Projects such as this water supply system to bring economic and social benefits to rural areas are components of hearts and minds projects.

Kennedy was already imbued with the philosophy of counter-insurgency when he took office as president in January 1961. He quickly expanded the Army's special forces, but army leadership was reluctant to endorse Kennedy's vision of combined military, economic, and social action to defeat the Viet Cong insurgency. General George Decker reportedly told Kennedy that "any good soldier can handle guerrillas" and the Army placed a priority on strengthening the ARVN rather than the police, militia, and para-military forces. Pacification or hearts and minds programs were only a minor factor contributing to the steady increase of U.S. advisers and other military personnel in Vietnam. The U.S. military command was optimistic that the assistance given to the South Vietnamese army was bearing fruit. The first commander of the Military Assistance Command, Vietnam (MACV) Paul D. Harkins, a proponent of conventional warfare, predicted that "the military phase of the war can be virtually won in 1963."

Kennedy was assassinated in November 1963, three weeks after the assassination of Ngo Dinh Diem. Kennedy adviser Roger Hilsman stated that "The Kennedy administration had developed a concept for fighting guerrilla warfare, an idea for a political program into which military measures were meshed, but we had failed so far to convince the Diem regime or even the top levels of the Pentagon to give it a fair trial."

== The war intensifies ==
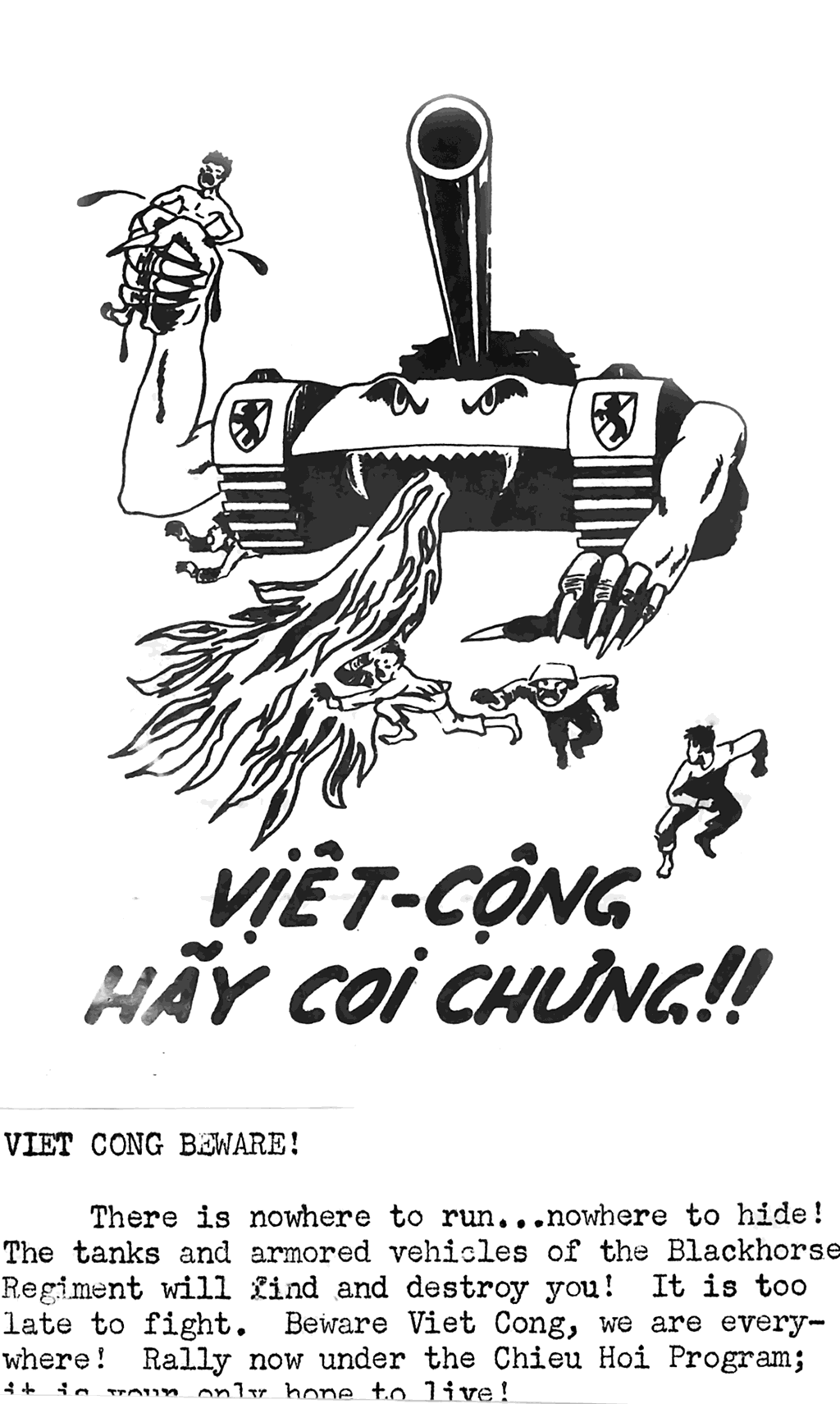
A propaganda leaflet urging Viet Cong and North Vietnamese fighters to defect to the side of South Vietnam.

New governments in Washington and Saigon created new pacification programs in 1964 as it became clear that, contrary to the U.S.'s optimism of 1963, the Viet Cong were steadily taking control of more territory and more people. British counter-insurgency expert Robert Grainger Ker Thompson said that the government's survival was at stake. Secretary of Defense Robert McNamara said in May 1964 that he could not understand "how the Viet Cong continually attacked and overran hamlets that the government and MACV listed as secure."

The next iteration of the pacification program came in 1964 with, for the first time, the direct participation in planning and execution by the American Embassy and MAC/V, now headed by General William Westmoreland. The Chien Thang (Struggle for Victory) pacification program was less ambitious than the Strategic Hamlet program, envisioning a gradual expansion, like an "oil spot" from government-controlled to communist-controlled areas, by providing security and services to rural areas. Along with the Chien Thang program was the related Hop Tac (Victory) program, directly involving the U.S. military in pacification for the first time. Hop Tac envisioned a gradual expansion outward from Saigon of areas under South Vietnamese government control. These programs also failed as the South Vietnamese army was unable to provide adequate security to rural residents in disputed areas.

In 1965, with the government of South Vietnam failing, the U.S. became directly involved in the war with a large infusion of American combat troops. Pacification programs took a back seat to Westmoreland's strategy of attrition—attempting to kill Viet Cong and an increasing number of North Vietnamese Army troops with search and destroy missions that utilized U.S. advantages in mobility and firepower. To defeat the Viet Cong, Westmoreland expressed his strategy in one word: "Firepower."

Doubts about the wisdom of the attrition strategy were expressed by many U.S. officials and military officers. A 1966 internal army study led by General Creighton Abrams concluded that pacification should be the main priority of the U.S. in Vietnam and that the U.S. Ambassador should have "unequivocal authority" over all U.S. activities, including military, in Vietnam. Westmoreland succeeded in squashing any implementation of the recommendations in the study.

== Renewed attention to hearts and minds programs ==
The growing American military presence in 1965 prevented an outright military victory by the Viet Cong and the increasingly present North Vietnamese army. General Nguyen Duc Thang led government pacification programs, creating the Revolutionary Development Cadre of young people recruited to serve in teams in the rural areas to improve both security and government services. The numbers of revolutionary cadre reached 21,000 in 1967 but desertions and those killed by the Viet Cong were high. The local defense forces, called the Regional Force and the Popular Force were expanded in numbers from about 200,000 to 300,000 members in 1966. The Ruff-Puffs, as they were called by Americans, were responsible for maintaining security in villages under government control. Their casualties during the war exceeded those of the ARVN.

President Lyndon Johnson shared President Kennedy's conviction that pacification was important in the Vietnam war. In February 1966, Johnson at a meeting with South Vietnamese and American leaders in Hawaii attempted to "get the gospel of pacification carved into the hearts and minds of all concerned." That signaled the beginning of a renewed effort by the U.S. to win hearts and minds in South Vietnam.

== Popularisation of phrase hearts and minds ==
Referring to Vietnam, President Johnson used some version of the phrase "hearts and minds" a total of 28 times. In ten of these instances, Johnson inverted the words and used the phrase "minds and hearts." The first time he used the phrase in his presidency was on 16 January 1964, and the last time was 19 August 1968. In his usage he addressed very different audiences, including heads of state, congressmen, and the American people. Also, Johnson referred to the "hearts and minds" of disparate groups, including the above-mentioned audiences and even humanity as a whole. His use of the phrase is most commonly taken from the speech "Remarks at a Dinner Meeting of the Texas Electric Cooperatives, Inc." on 4 May 1965. On that evening he said, "So we must be ready to fight in Vietnam, but the ultimate victory will depend upon the hearts and the minds of the people who actually live out there. By helping to bring them hope and electricity you are also striking a very important blow for the cause of freedom throughout the world."

Johnson's use of the phrase is most likely based on a quote of John Adams, the American Revolutionary War patriot and second president of the United States, who wrote in a letter dated 13 February 1818: "The Revolution was effected before the War commenced. The Revolution was in the minds and hearts of the people; a change in their religious sentiments of their duties and obligations... This radical change in the principles, opinions, sentiments, and affections of the people, was the real American Revolution". There was however an earlier use of the phrase, albeit rarely acknowledged in this context. John Adams was an educated man who had gone to Harvard and graduated in 1755 with an A.B., and in 1758 with an A.M., what are today known as Bachelor of Arts and Master of Arts respectively. It is therefore a reasonable assumption to believe that he was familiar with Shakespeare's use of the term as part of Mark Antony's speech to the crowd, just after Brutus's. Mark Antony says thus: "O masters, if I were disposed to stir your hearts and minds to mutiny and rage..."

== Getting the U.S. on one page ==
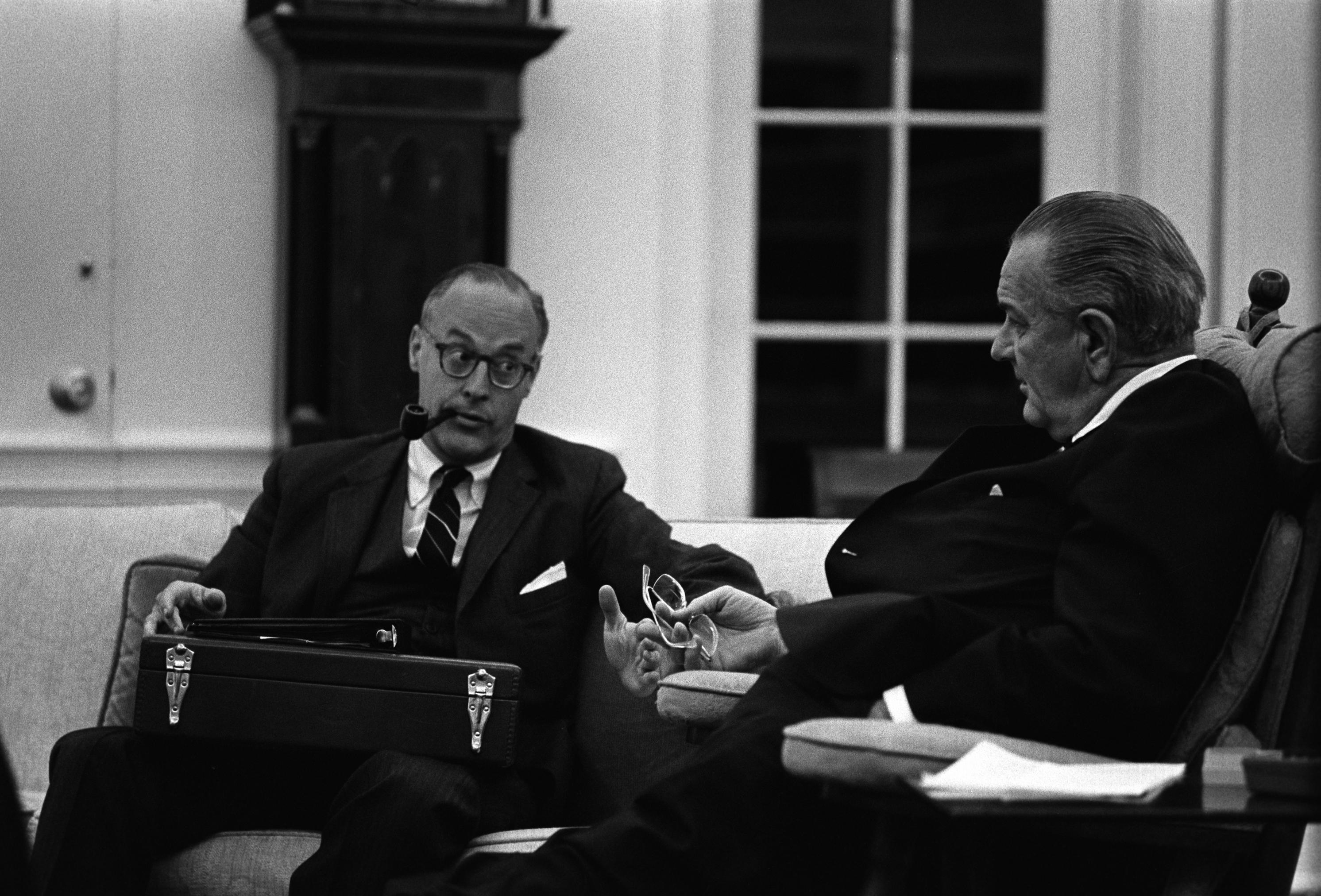
Komer (left) meeting with President Lyndon Johnson.

In 1966, Johnson appointed CIA official and National Security Council member Robert W. Komer ("Blowtorch Bob") as his special assistant for supervising pacification in South Vietnam. Komer's challenge was to unite the U.S government agencies—the military, Department of State, CIA, and the Agency for International Development — involved in pacification projects. Komer recommended the responsibility for pacification be vested in MAC/V, headed by General Westmoreland, through a civilian deputy who would head the U.S. pacification effort commanding both U.S. military and civilian personnel. Although his proposal was unpopular in all the agencies, Komer, with the support of Johnson, pressed forward. As a halfway measure the Office of Civil Operations (OCO) was set up with civilian leadership in November 1966 to coordinate all civilian pacification programs. OCO failed but strengthened Komer and Johnson's view that MAC/V leadership of the pacification program was essential.

Komer argued that the pacification success desired by President Johnson could only be achieved by integrating three tasks. The first and most basic requirement for pacification had to be security, because the rural population had to be kept isolated from the Viet Cong and the North Vietnamese army. If this was to be achieved, the insurgents had to be weakened both by destroying their infrastructure among the rural population and by developing programs to win their hearts and minds and gain support or at least toleration of the South Vietnamese government and the U.S. military forces. The third point emphasized by Komer was that the new strategy had to be applied on a large scale in order to turn around what had been up until then a war in which the insurgents held the initiative.

== Creation of CORDS ==
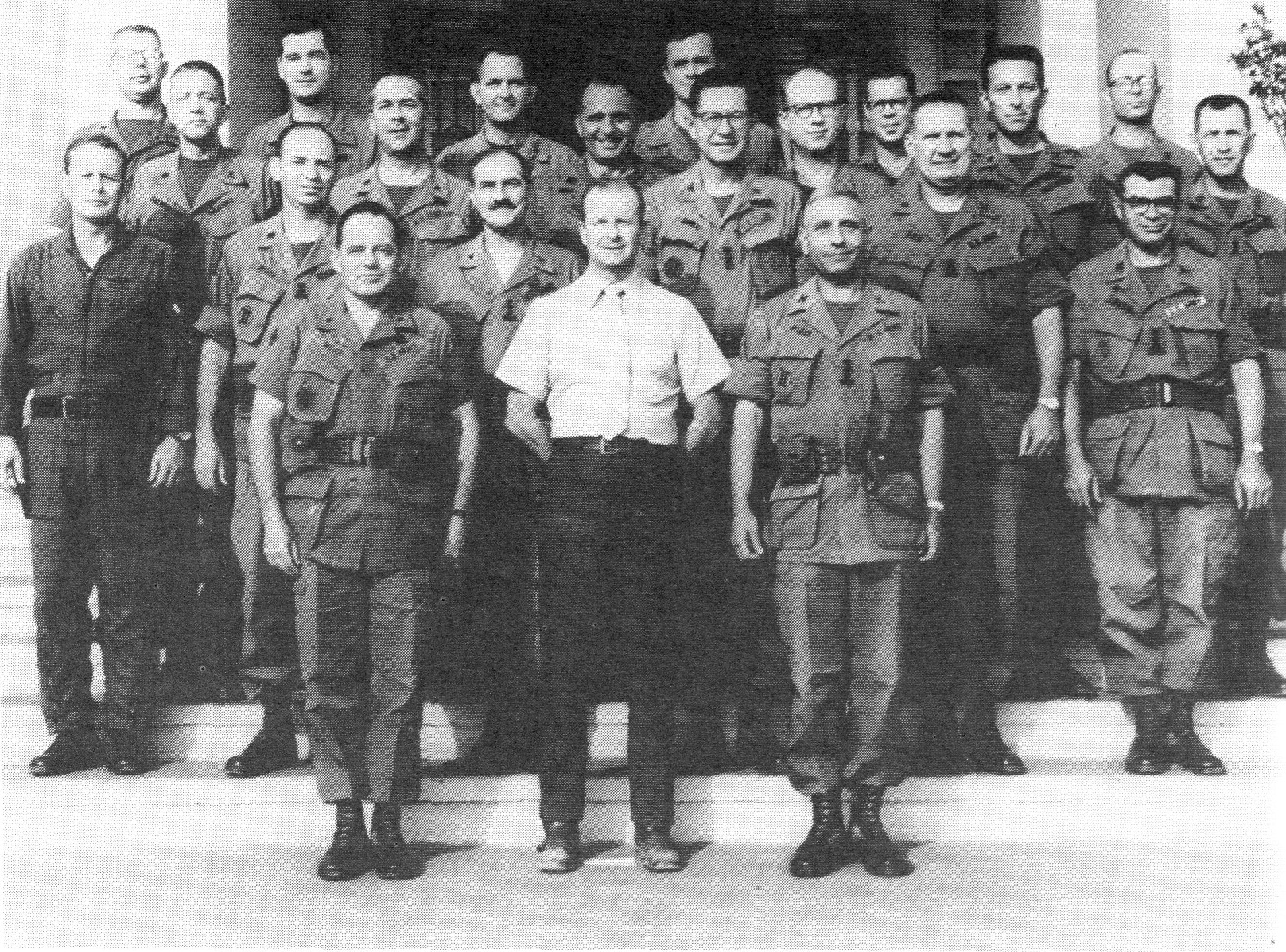
John Paul Vann (white shirt) and his mixed military and civilian CORDS staff at their Pleiku headquarters. Vann was an early advocate of pacification.

Organizationally, in Komer's view, the pacification goals required that efforts be concentrated under a single command. He believed that only the U.S. military had the resources and personnel to implement a large-scale pacification plan. After initial reservations, Westmoreland agreed with the plan, but civilian agencies still balked. They feared being marginalized and overwhelmed by the U.S. military with its much larger number of personnel and greater resources. Johnson overruled them and on 9 May 1967, the Civil Operations and Revolutionary Development Support organization (CORDS) was created. Komer was appointed one of Westmoreland's three deputy commanders with the title of Ambassador and the equivalent rank of a three-star general. This was the first time in U.S. history that an ambassador had served under a military command and been given authority over military personnel and resources.

Komer chose a military officer as his deputy and repeated the pattern of having either a civilian in charge of every component of CORDS with a military deputy or, alternatively, a military commander with a civilian deputy. He consolidated all the diverse pacification and civil affairs programs in Vietnam—military and civilian—under the authority of CORDS. Starting with a staff of 4,980, CORDS expanded to 8,327 personnel in the first six months of its operation. In 1968 CORDS was working in all 44 provinces and eventually was functioning in all 250 districts of Vietnam. About 85 percent of CORDS personnel were military, the remainder civilians. Each province was headed by a Vietnamese province chief, usually a colonel, who was supported by an American provincial senior adviser. The adviser's staff was divided into a civilian part which supervised area and community development and a military part which handled security issues.

== Success after Tet ==
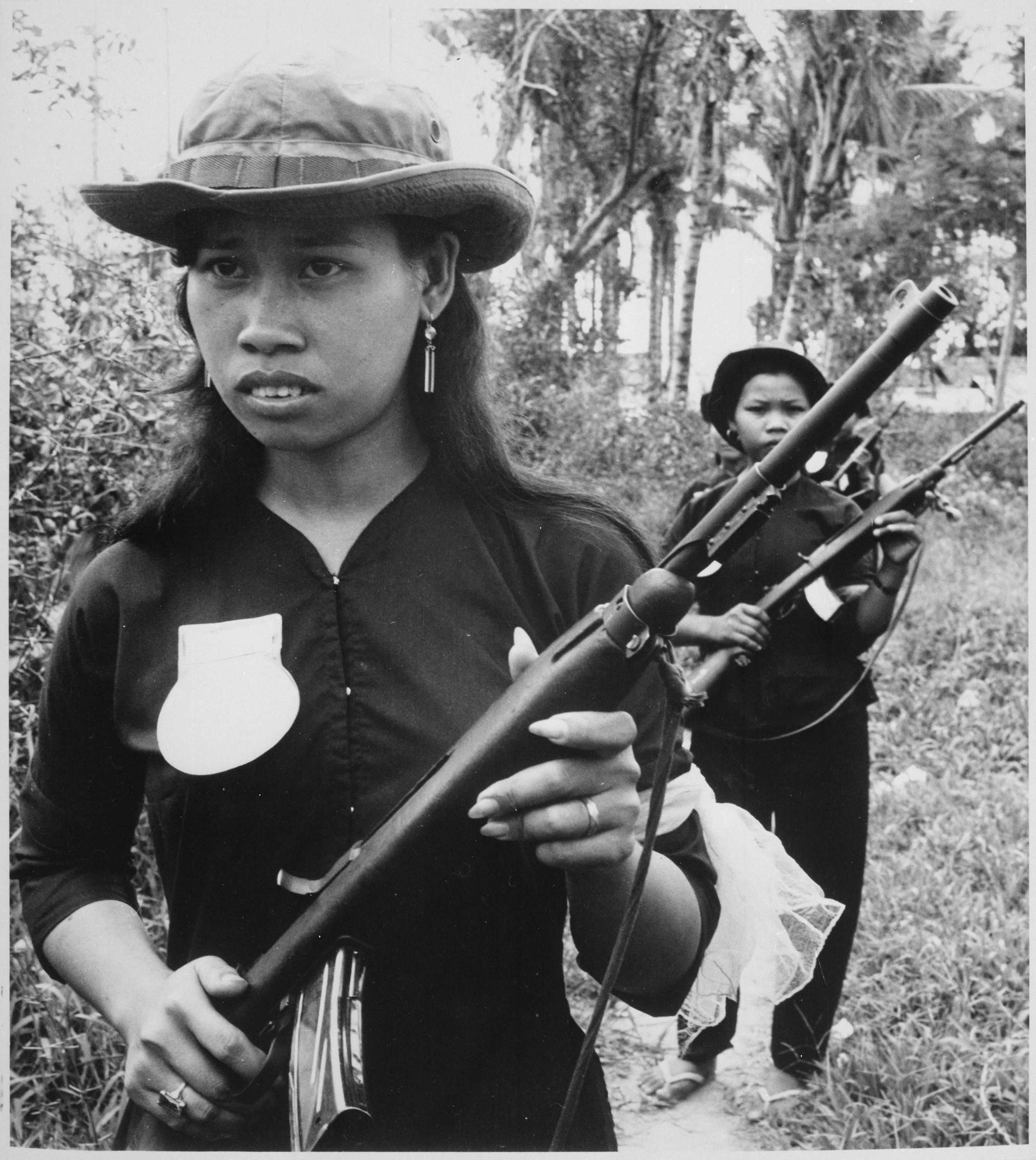
These women are members of the village self-defense forces (Ruff-Puffs) expanded and advised by CORDS.

On January 24, 1968, Komer warned that "something is in the wind." Seven days later the Tet Offensive was launched by the Viet Cong and the North Vietnamese army. Tet weakened the Saigon government's presence in the countryside which had been aided by CORDS. The Regional and Popular Forces abandoned the countryside in some areas to defend cities and towns, suffering more than 6,500 casualties, including desertions. Tet was a psychological and strategic defeat for South Vietnam and its American ally, but by resulting in heavy Viet Cong casualties facilitated an early return to the countryside by South Vietnamese authorities and CORDS. Project Recovery distributed food and construction material to rural dwellers and involved CORDS in reconstruction efforts in the cities and towns. By May 1968, the rural population living in "relatively secure" hamlets had returned to pre-Tet levels of 67 percent.

A new U.S. team in Vietnam promoted expanded hearts and minds programs. Ambassador Ellsworth Bunker supported pacification programs; General Creighton Abrams replaced Westmoreland as MACV commander; and William Colby replaced Komer as Abrams' deputy commander for pacification.

Abrams called his strategy for prosecuting the war the "one war concept." In Abrams' words, the U.S. would focus "upon protecting the population so that the civil government can establish its authority as opposed to an earlier conception of the purpose of war—destruction of the enemy's forces." Abrams' one war concept encountered opposition from U.S. army generals in Vietnam and in Washington and he was unable to effect all the changes in U.S. military strategy he proposed. Abrams' push for the adoption of his plan was overtaken by events as the U.S. military began withdrawing in 1969, but the government of South Vietnam adopted many elements of his plan.

With Abrams' and Bunker's support, and aided by the casualties the Viet Cong suffered in 1968, CORDS commander Colby reported substantial progress in pacification from 1969 to 1972. U.S. resources devoted to pacification increased dramatically and by early 1970, CORDS reported that 93 percent of rural dwellers in Vietnam lived in "relatively secure villages." North Vietnamese documents suggest that one reason for the 1972 North Vietnamese offensive was to reverse the progress made in pacification. CORDS, and U.S. participation in hearts and minds programs, effectively ended after the withdrawal from Vietnam of the last U.S. ground forces in August 1972.

== Assessment of hearts and minds programs ==
The success of hearts and minds programs in Vietnam was ambiguous in the words of Richard A. Hunt in his book Pacification. The high-level officials in the CORDS program claimed large successes. Some historians, however, maintain that pacification programs failed to dislodge the Viet Cong from their position of strength in the countryside.

After a long history of failed pacification programs, the successes reported for CORDS in the 1968–1972 period were partially attributable to the heavy casualties the Viet Cong suffered during the Tet Offensive and subsequent actions in 1968. The number of Viet Cong infrastructure is estimated to have been reduced from 84,000 in 1968 before Tet to 56,000 in 1972. However, although the number of battalion-size battles declined, the number of small unit actions by the Viet Cong nearly doubled during the same time period, illustrating the impact of hearts and minds (as believed by its advocates). In January 1972 Ambassador Bunker warned that the communists would have to "mount a major military offensive...to prove his public claims that Vietnamization and pacification are failures." True to Bunker's prediction, on March 30, 1972, North Vietnam launched its Easter Offensive. Although South Vietnam, with American air support, withstood the offensive, the North Vietnamese army gained control over sizable areas of South Vietnamese territory and displaced more than one million people.

Komer attributed the ultimate failure of hearts and minds programs in South Vietnam to the bureaucratic culture of the United States in addition to the administrative and military shortcomings of the South Vietnamese government. A counter-insurgency strategy for Vietnam was proposed from the earliest days of U.S. involvement in Vietnam, notably by Presidents Kennedy and Johnson, but there was an "immense gap between policy and performance." Early efforts to implement hearts and minds programs in Vietnam were small scale compared to the resources and manpower devoted to fighting a conventional war. Even after the creation of CORDS in 1967, "pacification remained a small tail to the very large conventional military dog. It was never tried on a large enough scale until too late."

Komer also criticized U.S. institutions for relying on conventional tactics and strategy in an unconventional, political war. "Instead of adapting to the Vietnamese situation, we fought the enemy our way at horrendous costs, and with some tragic side effects, because we lacked much capability to do otherwise... Institutional inertia" prevailed." CIA officer and later CIA Director William Colby said "The Pentagon had to fight the only war it knew how to fight, and there was no American organization that could fight any other."

A negative view about pacification in Vietnam was expressed by Richard Neustadt. "It was naïve to claim that the United States could achieve victory with limited means in a civil war on the Asian mainland. It was equally naïve, I think, to assume that we could change or win the hearts and minds of people, democratize a country not remotely under our own control, and thus aim at nationhood through Saigon's government. American military forces and civilian bureaucracies are not finely tuned enough for such assignments."

== See also ==
- Body count
- Hearts and Minds, 1974 documentary film on this subject
- John Paul Vann
- The light at the end of the tunnel
- Winning hearts and minds

== Bibliography ==
- https://web.archive.org/web/20110727100340/http://www.knowledgerush.com/kr/encyclopedia/Malayan_Emergency/
- https://web.archive.org/web/20101028014938/http://afsa.org/fsj/apr00/leepson.cfm
- http://www.heartsandminds.org/
- http://news.bbc.co.uk/2/hi/asia-pacific/7698055.stm
