= The Brain (club) =

Coordinates: 51.5108°N 0.1319°W

The Brain was a house and techno music venue in Soho, London. It was located on the former premises of the Apollo Club on 11 Wardour Street. The Brain was founded in 1989 by Sean McLusky and Mark 'Wigan' Williams. Several now famous DJs and producers played at the club, including Orbital, Leftfield, Billy Nasty, Goldie, Moby, Graeme Park, Mixmaster Morris, Andrew Weatherall, and A Guy Called Gerald. At the time there was little actual live performance on the techno scene (this would change later with the advent of raves). The Brain encouraged live sets and P.As at a time when only mainstream house music used vocals on tracks.

Sean McLusky went on to set up (the now defunct) Brainiak Records with Tim Fielding releasing music by such early UK electronic heroes as Ultramarine and Pete Lazonby, as well as legendary compilation albums Live at the Brain - Volumes One and Two, B-Sides and The Best of Brainiak.

In the early and mid-1990s Sean McLusky masterminded various seminal London clubs and venues including; Love Ranch at Maximus with Mark Wigan, Club UK, The Scala (club) in King's Cross, and the multi-faceted Sonic Mook Experiment.

In 1994 Tim Fielding co-founded Mr C's London nightclub The End.

== See also ==
- Progressive electronica
- Electronic dance music
