= There Is Nothing Else =

Studio album by Uncle John & Whitelock
- Released: 2006
- Recorded: 2003–2005; Redchurch Recordings (London, England) (tracks 1-8, 13, 16, 18-21); 2005; CaVa Studios (Glasgow, Scotland) (tracks 9-12, 14, 15, 17)
- Genre: Blues, rockabilly, surf
- Length: 61:59
- Label: God Forgot Man
- Producer: Frederick Baggs (tracks 1-8, 13, 16, 18-21); Geoff Allan (tracks 9-12, 14, 15, 17)

Professional ratings
Review scores
Source	Rating
Sunday Herald	5/5 stars
The Skinny	4/5 stars
Boomkat	(favourable)

There Is Nothing Else is the debut studio album by Uncle John & Whitelock. It was released in 2006 on CD and gatefold double LP and incorporates material recorded at Redchurch Recordings in London between 2003 and 2005 and material recorded at CaVa Studios in Glasgow in 2005. Included on the album are the singles The Train and 2 - Fiddy.

Critical reception for the album was favourable, it receiving a number of positive reviews, including a five star review in the Sunday Herald. In 2009, the album placed at number 18 in The Skinny's Scottish Albums of the Decade, described as a 'strange and singular work in the canon of Scottish rock'. The album cover, designed by Raydale Dower, is inspired by the cover of Konx om Pax by Aleister Crowley, who also gives track 7 on the album its title.

== Track listing ==
All tracks are written by Uncle John & Whitelock, except where noted.

Side one
No.	Title	Length
1.	"The Fold"	3:51
2.	"Black Hat"	2:45
3.	"2 - Fiddy"	2:54
4.	"Hospital"	3:34
5.	"Whalin'"	4:25

Side two
No.	Title	Length
6.	"Hard Rain"	2:45
7.	"Aleister Crowley"	2:46
8.	"Bless"	2:37
9.	"Tony"	3:40
10.	"40°"	2:20

Side three
No.	Title	Length
11.	"Baghdadi"	3:28
12.	"Dead Cheerful"	4:54
13.	"Black Milk"	2:24
14.	"Palmer" (Robert Palmer; Henry Mancini)	1:56
15.	"(reprise)"	1:51

Side four
No.	Title	Length
16.	"The Train"	5:07
17.	"Maryhill Vibe"	2:08
18.	"Backyard"	2:14
19.	"1000 Knives"	4:01
20.	"Don't Let Me Die"	2:19

== Personnel ==
- Jacob Lovatt – guitar, vocals
- Raydale Dower – bass
- Matthew Black – drums
- David Philp - guitar on all tracks except Black Hat, 2-Fiddy, Whalin' and The Train
- Jamie Bolland - Keyboards on all tracks except 2-Fiddy and The Train
- Andrew Hobson – guitar on Black Hat, 2-Fiddy, Whalin' and The Train
- Nic Denholm – keyboards on 2-Fiddy and The Train
- Engineers: Frederick Baggs and Geoff Allan
- Recorded at: Redchurch Recordings, London, England (tracks 1–8, 13, 16, 18–21) and CaVa Studios, Glasgow, Scotland (tracks 9–12, 14, 15, 17).
- Mastered at: CaVa Studios, Glasgow, Scotland
- Cover design: Raydale Dower and Jacob Lovatt
- Photography (inner sleeve): Alan Dimmick and Benji de Burca
- Typesetting: Robert Johnston
