= Cannon (band) =

Scottish post-rock band

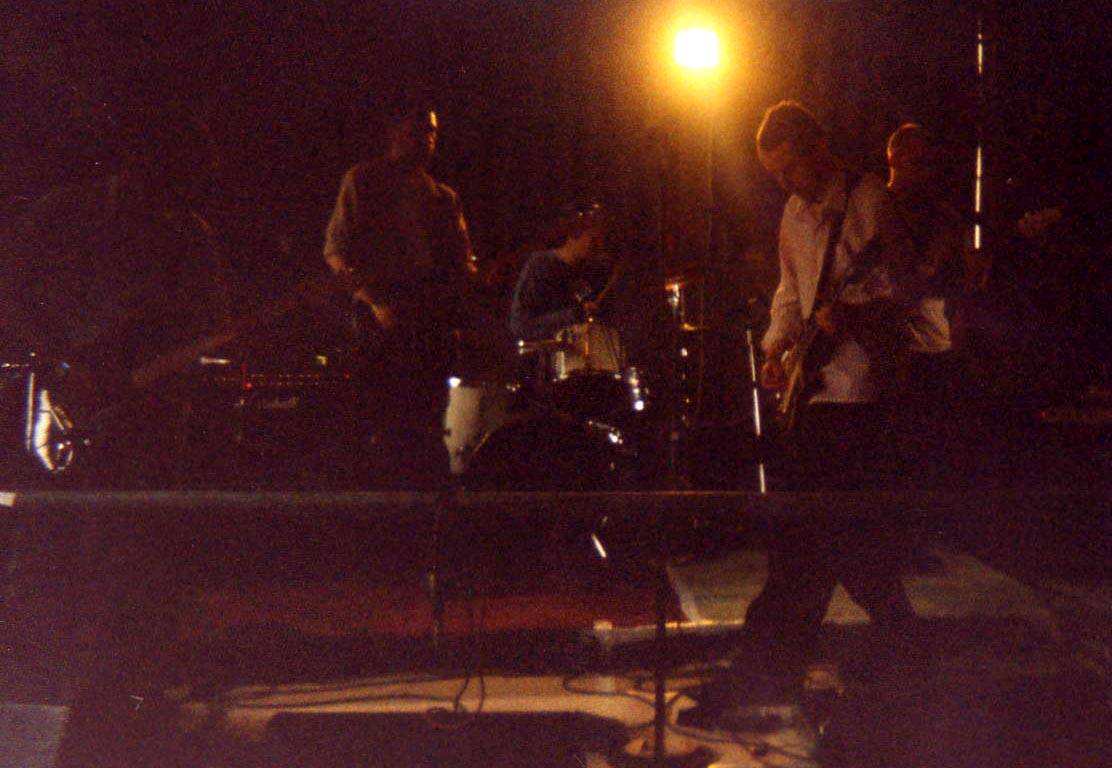
- Cannon, Truck Festival July 2001

Background information
- Origin: Glasgow, Scotland
- Genres: Post-rock
- Years active: 1999–2003
- Label: Cannon Music
- Past members: David Philp - Guitar; Jonny Williamson - Guitar; Stuart Henderson - Guitar; Tom Pettigrew - Drums; Andrew Gifford - Bass; Tim Harbinson - Drums; Craig Sinclair - Bass; Trevor Helliwell - Sound Engineer

Cannon were a five-piece, instrumental post-rock band, based in Glasgow, Scotland.

== History ==
Cannon was formed in early 1999 by guitarists David Philp, Stuart Henderson, and Jonny Williamson. The band lineup was completed by the addition of Andrew Gifford of Fiddlers' Bid on bass and drummer Tom Pettigrew.

Gigging throughout Scotland, Cannon played alongside bands such as Interpol, Bis, The Cooper Temple Clause and Medal, as well as appearances at music festivals such as Truck in 2001 and T in the Park in 2002. The band were championed by DJ Vic Galloway, their records getting regular play on his BBC Radio Scotland show, "Air", and they were invited to record a live session for the show.

Pettigrew left the band in late 2001 and was replaced by former Juliet Turner and Duke Special sideman Tim Harbinson. Gifford left several months later, and was replaced by Craig Sinclair.

Cannon disbanded in 2003. Philp went on to play in Glasgow 'horror blues' band, Uncle John & Whitelock, and was guitarist on Isobel Campbell and Mark Lanegan's 2008 European tour. Harbinson went on to join electronica band Laki Mera along with Trevor Helliwell, Cannon's sound engineer. Philp, Gifford and Pettigrew later formed Adopted as Holograph, playing gypsy influenced folk music.

== Music ==
Cannon's music, by virtue of its instrumental nature and the relative complexity of its arrangements has been described as post-rock or math rock. Comparisons have been made with bands such as Mogwai and Slint but also with 1980s alternative rock band the Cocteau Twins.

== Discography ==
Cannon album cover

=== Studio albums ===
- Cannon (2008)

=== EPs ===
- Soothsayer (2001)

=== Compilations ===
- T Break 2002 (2002)
- Gdansk (2003)
