= Light at the End of the Tunnel (disambiguation) =

The Light at the End of the Tunnel is a 1987 album by The Damned.

Light at the End of the Tunnel may also refer to:

- "Light at the End of the Tunnel" (song), a 1991 song by B. B. Watson
- "Light at the End of the Tunnel" (musical number), the gospel-style finale of the musical Starlight Express
- Light at the End of the Tunnel, a 1991 album by B. B. Watson
- "The Light at the End of the Tunnel (Is the Light of an Oncoming Train)", a song by Half Man Half Biscuit on the 2002 album Cammell Laird Social Club
- "The Light at the End of the Tunnel (Was a Train Coming the Other Way)", a song by Richard Hawley on the 2001 album Late Night Final

== See also ==
- The Light at the End of the Tunnel Is a Train, a 2005 album by British indie-electro act Whitey
- The Tunnel at the End of the Light, a 2004 novel by Stefan Petrucha
