= Adopted as Holograph =

Band from Glasgow, Scotland

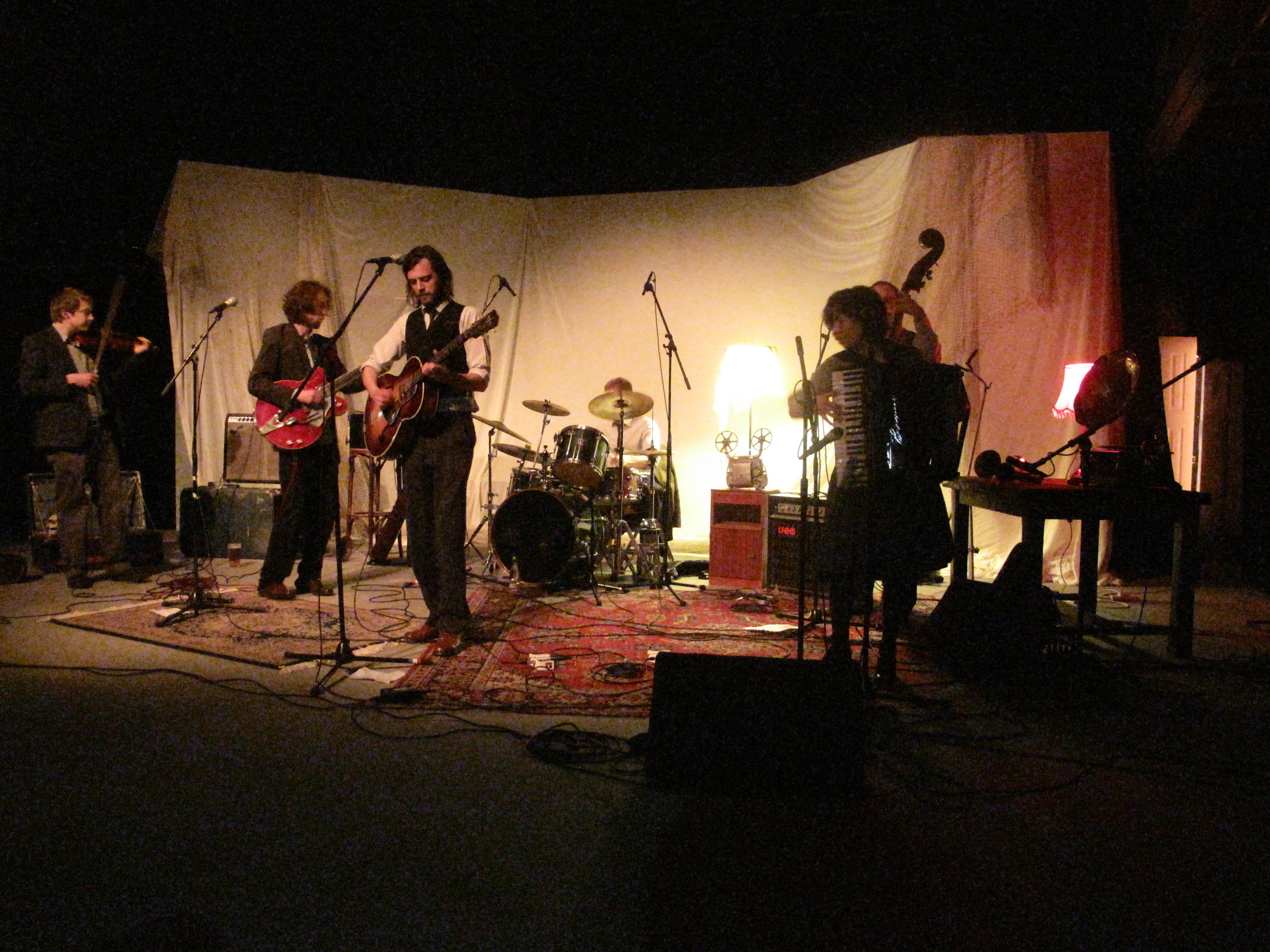
- Adopted as Holograph

Background information
- Origin: Glasgow, Scotland
- Genres: Alternative rock, continental jazz, baroque pop
- Years active: 2009–present
- Label: Holograph Records
- Members: David Philp - Guitar, vocals Andrew Gifford - Double bass Tom Pettigrew - Violin; Ryan Buchanan - Guitar; Chris Houston - Drums; Caroline Hussey - Accordion
- Website: Adopted as Holograph

Adopted as Holograph are a Scottish band from Glasgow, Scotland. Blending alternative rock with continental jazz and Balkan music, their music frequently incorporates Gothic themes and has been described as Gypsy Jazz Noir.

== History ==
Adopted as Holograph was originally formed in 2009 by former Uncle John & Whitelock and Cannon guitarist, David Philp. After touring with Isobel Campbell & Mark Lanegan in 2008, Philp enlisted Andrew Gifford (Fiddlers' Bid, Cannon) on double bass and Tom Pettigrew (Cannon) on violin. The band gigged as a three piece for the next year before adding Hussy and the Wolf band members Caroline Hussey and Ryan Buchanan respectively on accordion and guitar, and Chris Houston on drums.

The band's name is a term from Scots law concerning documents like wills (where "holograph" means signature). The phrase was removed from legal usage in 1995 as part of a modernisation of archaic jargon.

The band toured the UK festival circuit in 2011 and were featured in session on Mary Ann Kennedy's Global Gathering show on BBC Radio Scotland in April 2012.

Influenced by Eastern European music, 1950s Rock and Roll and Gypsy Jazz, they have a style that has been described as Gypsy Jazz Noir and as having a "vaguely eastern/klezmer-y feel", and their music has drawn broad comparisons with The Doors, The Divine Comedy, Tindersticks and The Monochrome Set.

Their eponymous debut album, Adopted as Holograph, was released in January 2013, and received positive reviews.

== Discography ==
=== Albums ===
- Adopted as Holograph (2013)
