= Clutter (album) =

Studio album by Laki Mera
- Released: April 2008
- Recorded: 2007–2008; Carrier Waves Studios (Glasgow, Scotland)
- Genre: Electronica, folktronica
- Length: 50:52
- Label: Rhythm of Life
- Producer: Laki Mera

Laki Mera chronology
Clutter (2008)	The Proximity Effect (2011)

Professional ratings
Review scores
Source	Rating
The Herald	5/5 stars
The Scotsman	3/5 stars
Scotland on Sunday	3/5 stars

Clutter is the debut studio album by Laki Mera. In December 2007, prior to its official release on CD in April 2008, the band made the album available for free download via their record label, Rhythm of Life's website. The album was critically well-received, getting a 5 star review from The Herald, and the risky strategy of offering it for free proved beneficial to the band, providing them with exposure and increasing their audience.

== Track listing ==
All tracks are written by Laki Mera

No.	Title	Length
1.	"She's A Day Later"	5:27
2.	"Signals"	5:35
3.	"How Dare You"	3:39
4.	"Weighed Down"	5:01
5.	"(Velcro)"	0:36
6.	"No Motion"	4:55
7.	"I'm Talking"	5:34
8.	"Seagull's Nex"	4:17
9.	"Zeuhl"	5:20
10.	"To Be Seen"	3:06
11.	"You"	0:12
12.	"Me"	0:08
13.	"Everyone"	0:04
14.	"Bumble B"	6:04

== Personnel ==
- Andrea Gobbi – Programming, synths, guitars
- Laura Donnelly – Vocals, Guitars, Synths
- Keir Long – Programming, Synths
- Trev Helliwell – Cello, Synths
- Tim Harbinson – Drums
- Laki Mera – Engineering
