= Sean McLusky =

British music promoter

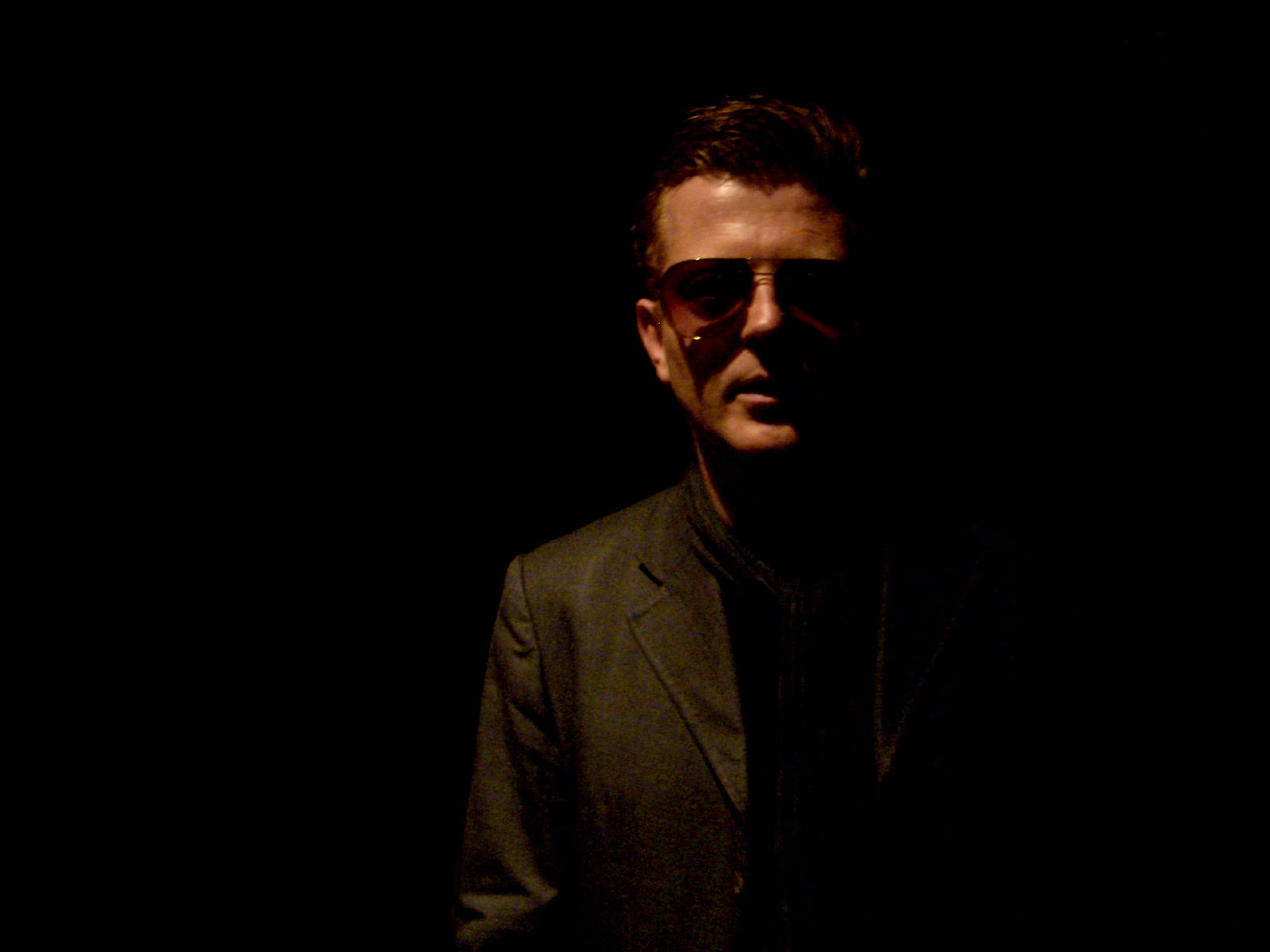
- Born: London, England
- Occupations: Producer, music promoter, impresario

Sean McLusky is a British music promoter, nightclub impresario and film producer.

== Early life ==
Sean grew up in Welwyn Garden City. After leaving school he attended art college in Stratford upon Avon and Bristol. The early 1980s saw Sean McLusky as a professional musician, with original Indie band Subway Sect and then with beat outfit JoBoxers, scoring two top ten singles at home and touring a debut album across Europe and the USA. McLusky also became a music promoter in the mid-1980s with soul all-nighters and a weekly live night called 'Club Left' in Soho, London.

== Career ==
=== The Brain Club ===
McLusky's first venue takeover / makeover started with The Brain (club) in Soho London with partner, Mark Wigan. McLusky and Wigan transformed the interior of an old bar launching it as The Brain. early 1989. This new club was to be one of the first to host house music nights most days of the week, new electronic live artists like Orbital, Adamski, and A Guy Called Gerald gave some of their early live performances there. McLusky produced two compilation albums out of this venue for his label Brainiak Records: Live at the Brain and Live at the Brain 2 featuring many of the artists that played at the club such as Orbital, Nexus 21, Sheep on Drugs and Mr Monday.

=== Love Ranch ===
By 1991, McLusky and partner Mark Wigan had found a new professional home at Maximus in London's Leicester Square. The 'Love Ranch' club night was created, with a cast of resident DJs that included Andrew Weatherall from Boys Own / Sabres of Paradise at the time, Paul Daley from Leftfield, Darren Emerson from Underworld, Danny Rampling from Shoom and Al Mackenzie from D-Ream. Following Love Ranch, in 1993, McLusky also re-launched and promoted the recently re-discovered Cafe de Paris with his flagship 'Merry England' club night.

=== Club UK ===
In 1994, McLusky was appointed as the creative heart of a new venue in South London, which he designed and programmed, christening it Club UK, soon successfully challenging the dominance of the well-established Ministry of Sound, drawing over 3,000 people every Friday and Saturday. The club featured the regular DJ talents of Andrew Weatherall, John Digweed, Paul Oakenfold, Carl Cox, Justin Robertson, John Kelly and Laurent Garnier.

=== Leisure Lounge ===
In 1994, McLusky instigated the conversion of the Old Paddocks snooker club in Holborn, which he designed and launched as the Leisure Lounge, ‘a voracious pace-setting and attitude-free venue’ The Leisure Lounge featured a mix of dance music club nights like Goldie's Metalheadz and live music events, plus arts events like Rankin's first major London photography show.

=== The Complex ===
At the same time, McLusky began a long-term annual collaboration with the Mean Fiddler organization, programming the dance stage Reading Festival and organizing the festival aftershow events.

Around the same time as The Complex was seizing a substantial share of the market, McLusky became involved with a more radical and intimate club night, ‘Fantasy Ashtray’ at Soho's Madame Jo Jo's. Called by Time Out ‘...a rockin’, punky, thrash night with live acts’, Fantasy Ashtray was founded on genuine musical variety and featured classic live acts like Jayne County and the Electric Chairs alongside new live underground talent.

=== Sonic Mook Experiment @ 333 Old Street ===
After a six-month stay in New York, McLusky was the first promoter to discover the 333 club in what was then the very run down, quiet district of London called Shoreditch Sonic Mook pioneered the practice of multi-room, multi sound, eclecticism, drawing hordes of disaffected youths to this forgotten quarter of London. Unconventional and debauched Sonic Mook Experiment attracted a ‘stunning mix of loyal radical chic cognoscenti’ (Time Out) but with awful/ ‘ironic’ DJs playing power ballads and rock anthems plus an eclectic mix of dance music DJs and guest musicians like Mark E Smith (The Fall), Jerry Dammers (Specials), Jimmy Pursey (Sham 69), Dee Dee Ramone (Ramones), Alan Vega (Suicide). People dispensed with the pretensions and conventions of the West End and came to sample the new East End in what has been cryptically described by Loaded magazine as ‘an eclectic Capri of madness – driven by the insane’. . Sonic Mook Experiment grew in infamy at the 333 Club in Shoreditch from 1996 to 1999 before moving to the Scala in Kings Cross.

=== The Scala ===
The next major project was two years in the making; the conception, design, conversion, programming and launch of The Scala in Kings Cross London, eventually opening in March 1999 to critical acclaim. A derelict cinema infamous for its all-night films in the eighties was transformed under McLusky's guidance into a spectacular music venue hosting club nights featuring DJs including James Lavelle, The Chemical Brothers, Mr Thing, Fabio, Storm Bailey, and diverse live music programming including shows from Royal Trux, Coldplay, Roni Size, Moby, Pavement, Foo Fighters, Johnny Marr, Sigue Sigue Sputnik plus eclectic film events like a Russ Meyer retrospective with guests including Hugh Hefner. Sean also programmed in arts events and exhibitions like shows from Mick Rock & ex Warhol photographer Nat Finkelstien.

=== Sonic Mook Compilations on Mute Records 2001 / 2003 ===
In 2001, McLusky produced some eclectic rock and roll and electronica albums for Mute's Blast First label; 1 Sonic Mook Experiment featuring – Primal Scream, Death in Vegas, Pulp, Clinic, Fat Truckers, Playgroup. 2 'Future Rock&Roll' featuring the new breed of Rock&Roll bands emerging from the UK & US underground, like -Yeah Yeah Yeah's, Liars, The Hives, Whitey, Electralane, Icara Colt, The Beatings and The Parkinsons, and 3 'Hot Shit' featuring – Radio 4, !!! Chk Chk Chk, Chrome Hoof, Ex Models and Erase Errata. With Sonic Mook events at the ICA, South Bank Centre, 93 Feet East, Cargo and the Astoria Theatre in London, plus events in Barcelona and Berlin, featuring DJ's and new live talent.

=== Future Rock & Roll Festival @ ICA 2002 ===
McLusky created a four-day new bands festival at the ICA to be held during the queen's golden jubilee weekend in June 2002. The festival and accompanying compilation album became the catalyst for the emerging new Rock & Roll scene in London. The festival featured over 20 new bands including The Libertines, 80s Matchbox B-Line Disaster, The Parkinsons, Liars, The Beatings, Buff Medways, Martini Henry Rifles, McLusky and Earl Brutus. He worked on this with long term collaborator Martin J Tickner.

=== Le Nouveau Rock and Roll Francais ===
In 2003, McLusky started taking new UK bands over to Paris to play the clubs Batofar and Nouveau Casino, convinced that there must be a local scene lurking under the surface in Paris and with the help of local rocker & DJ Jean Baptiste Juillot, he started to dig about in the Paris underground, bands were found and booked in as supports on his Paris bills.

A deal was struck with V2 France to produce a compilation album named by McLusky Le Nouveau Rock'n'Roll Français.

=== 1-2-3-4 Records ===
In 2004, Sean McLusky started 1-2-3-4 Records, releasing singles and albums from artists emerging from the new East London music scene like Whitey (musician), Babyshambles, Cazals, Negative For Francis, Twisted Charm, The White Sport, Cosmetique, The Bishops, The Objects, Trafalgar, Lowline, and more recently new bands Arrows Of Love, Bad For Lazarus, Teenage Mothers, Sisteray, Factotum and new material from classic artists Buzzcocks.

=== Return To New York ===
In 2003, McLusky teamed up with the DJ / Producer Arthur Baker to create a series of global events called ‘Return To New York’. Its London home was the Great Eastern Hotel and the events featured artists like LCD Soundsystem, Peaches, New Order, Pet Shop Boys, Tom Tom Club, Debbie Harry, Phil Oakey, Junior Sanches, Erol Alkan and 2 many Djs (Soulwax). ‘Return To New York’ also hosted events at the Miami Winter Music Conference with line ups including The Rapture, LCD, Peaches, Milo, Princess Superstar, 2 Many Djs and they have toured the events at major venues and festivals across Europe. ‘Return to New York’ events were designed to bridge the last 20 years of electronic music, unifying the talents of the originators with the new breed of DJ /producers and live acts.

=== The 1-2-3-4 Festival ===
In the summer of 2007, McLusky started in partnership with long term collaborator Martin J Tickner – The 1-2-3-4 Festival in East London promoting emerging bands alongside international artists. The festival has featured artists including: Har Mar Superstar with Fab Morretti from The Strokes, Florence and the Machine, The Rakes, Patrick Woolf, The Warlocks, Bobby Gillespie (Primal Scream), Glen Matlock (Sex Pistols), Zak Starkey (The Who), Peter Hook (New Order / Joy Division), Black Lips, Ravonettes, Lydia Lunch, Damo Suzuki (Can), Buzzcocks, Deap Vally, Iceage, The Duke Spirit, Dirty Beaches, Mark Stewart (The Pop Group), Crocodiles, and Dum Dum Girls.

=== Sean McLusky Artist Management ===
A brief list of signings to major and indie labels include: The Martini Henry Rifles 2001 / 2004 signing to FF Vinyl. Whitey 2004 / 2006 signing to Universal, Towers Of London 2005 / 2006 signing to TVT records, Cazals 2005 / 2007 signing to Kitsune Records. S.C.U.M (band) 2008 / 2012 signing to Mute Records and touring with The Horrors, The Kills, Saint Leonard's Horses, 2016 (Kieran Leonard)

=== Sean McLusky DJ ===
Sean McLusky has DJed across the globe – Miami Winter Music, Space (Ibiza nightclub) and Privilege in Ibiza, and at festivals and clubs in Berlin, Tel Aviv, Amsterdam, Copenhagen, Millan, Madrid, Lisbon, Warsaw, Kraków, New York City, Los Angeles, plus a long running residency at Razzmatazz Club in Barcelona, he is also a regular at the Playboy Club, The Scotch of St. James, Tramp (nightclub), Ace Hotel and the Dog Star in London. Mclusky also consults on hotel music programming – clients have included: the Great Eastern Hotel & South Place Hotel in City of London, The Mondrian Hotel, and Ace Hotel.

=== 1-2-3-4 FILMS ===
In 2011, McLusky set up 1-2-3-4 Films with Writer/Director Trevor Miller to develop and produce films. Their first production, entitled Riot on Redchurch Street is a feature film shot on location in East London. It juxtaposes the 'downtown' music scene against a backdrop of Anglo-Muslim racial tension. The cast includes Allyson Paradis, Jesse Birdsall, Sam Hazeldine, Les McKeown, Lois Winstone, with a soundtrack featuring original songs by Siobhan Fahey (Shakespears Sister). Time Out gave 'Riot' three-stars and described the film as "a hybrid between Gangster No. 1 and Stalking Pete Doherty." 1-2-3-4 Films has two more features in pre-production for 2015 ‘This Charming Man’ and ‘Trip City.’
