= One in Four =

Compilation album by Various Artists
- Released: 2004
- Genre: Various
- Length: 61:59
- Label: SAMH

One in Four is a compilation album released by the mental health charity The Scottish Association for Mental Health in 2004. It compiles 14 exclusive and previously unheard tracks recorded by artists who had previously been involved in events run by the charity.

More than 250,000 copies of the album were distributed to people in Scotland to raise awareness of mental health issues. It takes its name from the statistic that one in four people in Scotland will experience mental health problems at some point in their lives.

== Track listing ==
No.	Title	Length
1.	"Eyes Wide Open" (Teenage Fanclub)	3:51
2.	"Everything is Everyone's Fault" (Multiplies)	2:45
3.	"How to be Dead" (Snow Patrol)	2:54
4.	"Aye Today" (The Delgados)	3:34
5.	"Salute the Divine Within You" (Future Pilot A.K.A)	4:25
6.	"Helicon 2" (Mogwai)	2:45
7.	"Mustard" (Arab Strap)	2:46
8.	"Fade Grey to Fade Blue" (James Orr Complex)	2:37
9.	"The Model" (Belle & Sebastian)	3:40
10.	"Long Time Walking" (Eugene Kelly)	2:20
11.	"The Train" (Uncle John & Whitelock)	3:28
12.	"This is a Fuse" (Vera Cruise)	4:54
13.	"Boo Hoo!" (Park Attack)	2:24
14.	"Torch Number One" (Macrocosmica)	1:56
