= Pressure sensitive =

Pressure sensitive may refer to:

- Pressure-sensitive adhesive
- Pressure-sensitive paper
- Pressure-sensitive tape
- Piezoelectric sensor
- Pressure sensor
- Pressure-sensitive microphone: see also proximity effect
- the force with which a key is held after initial impact (see keyboard expression)
- Pressure Sensitive, a 1975 album by Ronnie Laws
