= Luck (Jacob Yates and the Pearly Gate Lock Pickers album) =

Studio album by Jacob Yates and the Pearly Gate Lock Pickers
- Released: June 2011
- Recorded: 2009–2011; Green Door Studios (Glasgow, Scotland)
- Genre: Doom-wop, alternative rock, rockabilly
- Length: 34:10
- Label: RE:PEATER Records
- Producer: Emily Maclaren, Stuart Evans

Professional ratings
Review scores
Source	Rating
The Skinny	4/5 stars
The Scotsman	3/5 stars

Luck is the debut studio album by Jacob Yates and the Pearly Gate Lock Pickers. Recorded between 2009 and 2011 at Green Door Studios in Glasgow, the album was released in June 2011. The album was well-received, with the music described as "dark with a mischievous grin" and as having a "Mississippi-meets-Maryhill sound".

It was named "Album of the Week" by Vic Galloway on his BBC Radio Scotland show.

== Track listing ==
All tracks are written by Jake Lovatt.

No.	Title	Length
1.	"Mark"	3:19
2.	"The Black Dog"	2:22
3.	"Mary Hell"	6:50
4.	"Dundee"	4:51
5.	"Can't Stop"	2:32
6.	"Vessels"	4:14
7.	"Lemonade"	2:51
8.	"When You Left Me"	7:10

== Personnel ==
- Jake Lovatt - Guitar, vocals
- Richard Holmes - Bass
- Jamie Bolland - Keyboards, Guitar
- Michael Bleazard - Drums
- Engineers: Emily Maclaren, Stuart Evans
- Recorded at: Green Door Studios, Glasgow, Scotland
- Cover design: Jake Lovatt
