= The Light at the End of the Tunnel Is a Train =

Studio album by Whitey
- Released: 21 March 2005
- Genres: Electronic rock; dance-punk; lo-fi; alternative dance
- Length: 44:50
- Labels: 1234; Dim Mak
- Producers: Whitey; Robert Harder

Whitey chronology
The Light at the End of the Tunnel Is a Train (2005)	Great Shakes (2007)

Singles from The Light at the End of the Tunnel Is a Train
- 1. "Y.U.H.2.B.M.2" Released: 2003; 2. "Leave Them All Behind" Released: 2003; 3. "Non Stop / A Walk In The Dark" Released: 14 February 2005

The Light at the End of the Tunnel Is a Train is the debut studio album by British electronic musician Whitey. It was released on 21 March 2005 through 1234 Records in the UK and a year later through Dim Mak Records in the US. It was supported with singles "Y.U.H.2.B.M.2", "Leave Them All Behind" and "Non Stop".

== Reception ==
Professional ratings
Review scores
Source	Rating
Pitchfork	5.2/10
PopMatters	6/10
The Guardian	4/5 stars
The Observer	4/5 stars

AllMusic said the album "features many examples of the clanking bass and twittering sequencers that'll be familiar to all denizens of sweaty nightclubs since the dawn of the synthesizer age. Whitey's vocals are soft and insinuating on tracks like 'Can't Go Out, Can't Stay In' and Beck-like on 'Halfway Gone', all the better to conjure the days of OMD, Soft Cell, and Suicide." The publication also drew comparisons to Kraftwerk, Gary Numan, and New Order.

== Track listing ==
All tracks are written by Nathan Joseph White.

No.	Title	Length
1.	"Intro/In the Limelight"	3:37
2.	"Leave Them All Behind"	4:38
3.	"Y.U.H.2.B.M.2."	4:22
4.	"A Walk in the Dark/Reprise"	5:38
5.	"Can't Go out, Can't Stay In"	4:29
6.	"Tantrum"	3:49
7.	"Hahaha"	4:09
8.	"Halfway Gone"	5:15
9.	"Non Stop"	3:48
10.	"The Light at the End of the Tunnel Is a Train"	5:05
Total length:		44:50

Japanese bonus tracks
No.	Title	Length
11.	"The Awful Truth"	4:01
12.	"Just Another Animal"	3:34

Extended Edition bonus tracks
No.	Title	Length
11.	"Just Another Animal"	3:30
12.	"Play Me"	3:33
13.	"Shut Up, Look Happy"	3:10
14.	"The Awful Truth"	4:03
15.	"Twoface"	3:47
16.	"Poor Thing"	5:47

Notes

- "Y.U.H.2.B.M.2" is known as "Why You Have To Be Me" for its single release.
- "Intro/In The Limelight" and "A Walk In The Dark/Reprise" have shortened titles in some releases

== Personnel ==
- Nathan J. White – songwriter, vocals, programmer, guitar, bass, organ, vibraphone, violin, drums, xylophone, producer, artwork
- Sean McLusky – drums (tracks 1, 4)
- Julian-Shah Tayler – guitar (tracks 3, 11)
- Patrick Walden – guitar (track 3)
- William "Wildcat Will" Blanchard – drums (tracks 7–9)
- Paul Harrison – engineer (tracks 1, 3, 6, 7)
- Robert Harder – co-producer, engineer (tracks 2, 4, 5, 8, 9, 11)
- Paul Spence – engineer (track 10)
- Patrick Duffy – art direction, design
- Chris Graham – artwork
