= The Proximity Effect (Laki Mera album) =

Studio album by Laki Mera
- Released: 30 May 2011
- Recorded: 2010–2011
- Studio: Carrier Waves Studios (Glasgow, Scotland)
- Genre: Electronica, folktronica
- Length: 55:51
- Label: Just Music
- Producer: Laki Mera

Laki Mera chronology
Clutter (2008)	The Proximity Effect (2011)	Turn All Memory to White Noise (2013)

Professional ratings
Review scores
Source	Rating
The Sunday Times	4/5 stars
Drowned in Sound	8/10 stars

The Proximity Effect is the second studio album by Laki Mera and their first release from the Just Music label. Released in May 2011, the album was well-received, being described in The Sunday Times as "a dense folktronic architecture with an intricacy and subtlety that recalls the Blue Nile, Cocteau Twins and Portishead." The single, "Fool", from the album was named The Daily Record's single of the week.

== Track listing ==
All tracks are written by Laki Mera

No.	Title	Length
1.	"The Beginning of the End"	4:22
2.	"More Than You"	3:33
3.	"Fingertips"	5:52
4.	"Double Back"	4:40
5.	"Onion Machine"	3:48
6.	"How Dare You"	3:48
7.	"Crater"	3:53
8.	"Solstice"	6:03
9.	"Pollok Park"	5:57
10.	"Fool"	4:22
11.	"Reverberation"	6:08
12.	"The End of the Beginning"	3:25

== Personnel ==
- Andrea Gobbi – Programming, synths, guitars
- Laura Donnelly – Vocals, Guitars, Synths
- Keir Long – Programming, Synths
- Tim Harbinson – Drums
- Trevor Helliwell – Cello, Synths
- Laki Mera – Engineering
