= Uncle John & Whitelock =

Scottish horror punk band

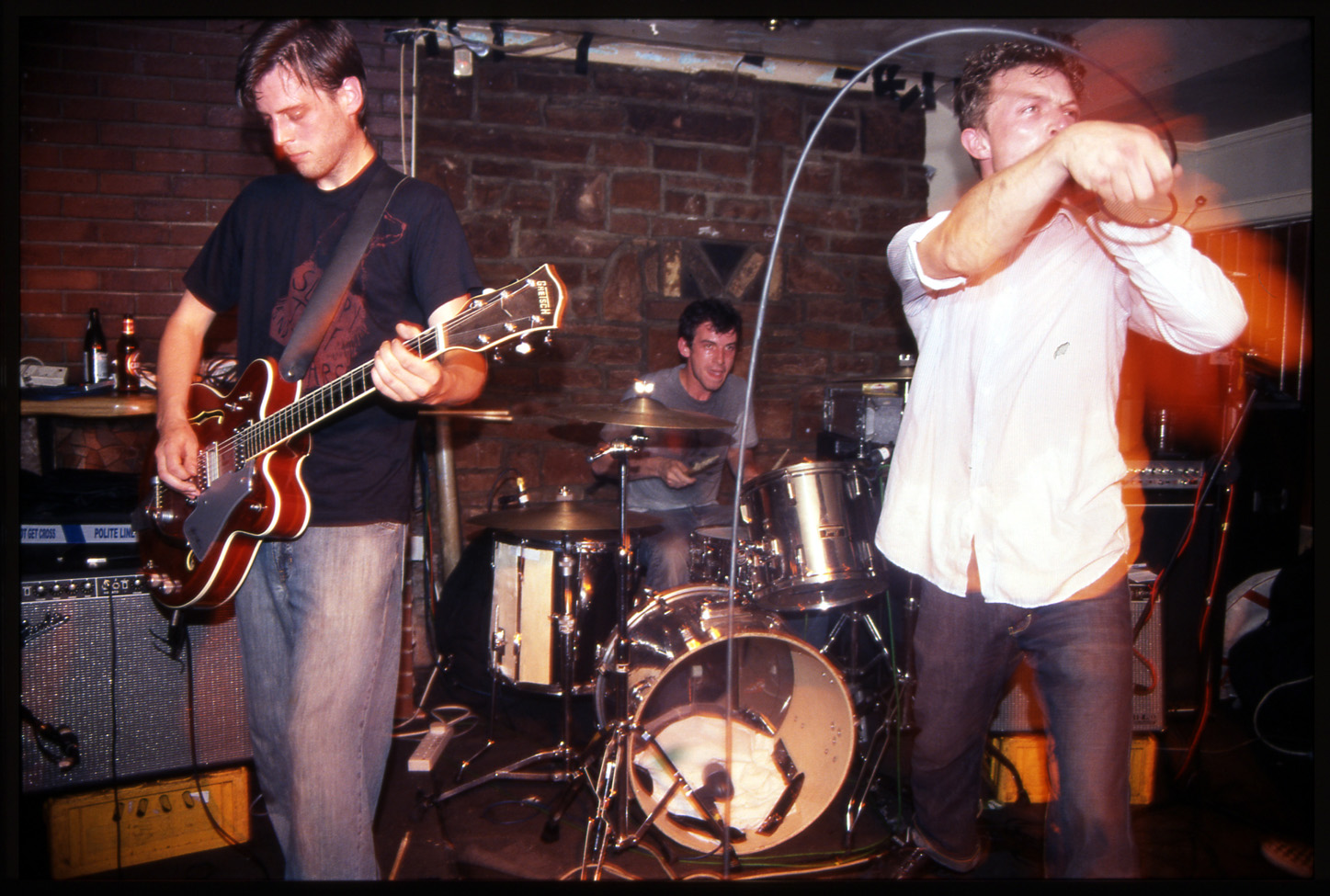
- Uncle John and Whitelock performing live 3 August 2005; Photo: Stephen Robinson

Background information
- Origin: Glasgow, Scotland
- Genres: Horror punk, Blues, Rockabilly, Surf, Psychobilly, Garage rock
- Years active: 2001–2006
- Label: God Forgot Man
- Past members: Jacob Lovatt - Guitar, vocals Raydale Dower - Bass; Andrew Hobson - Drums (2001–02), Guitar (2002–05); Matthew Black - Drums (2002–06); Nic Denholm - Keyboards (2002–05); David Philp - Guitar (2004–06); Jamie Bolland - Keyboards (2005–06)
- Website: Uncle John and Whitelock

Uncle John & Whitelock were a Scottish horror punk band from Glasgow. They were active from 2001 to 2006 and were noted for their live shows which incorporated elements of performance art.

== History ==
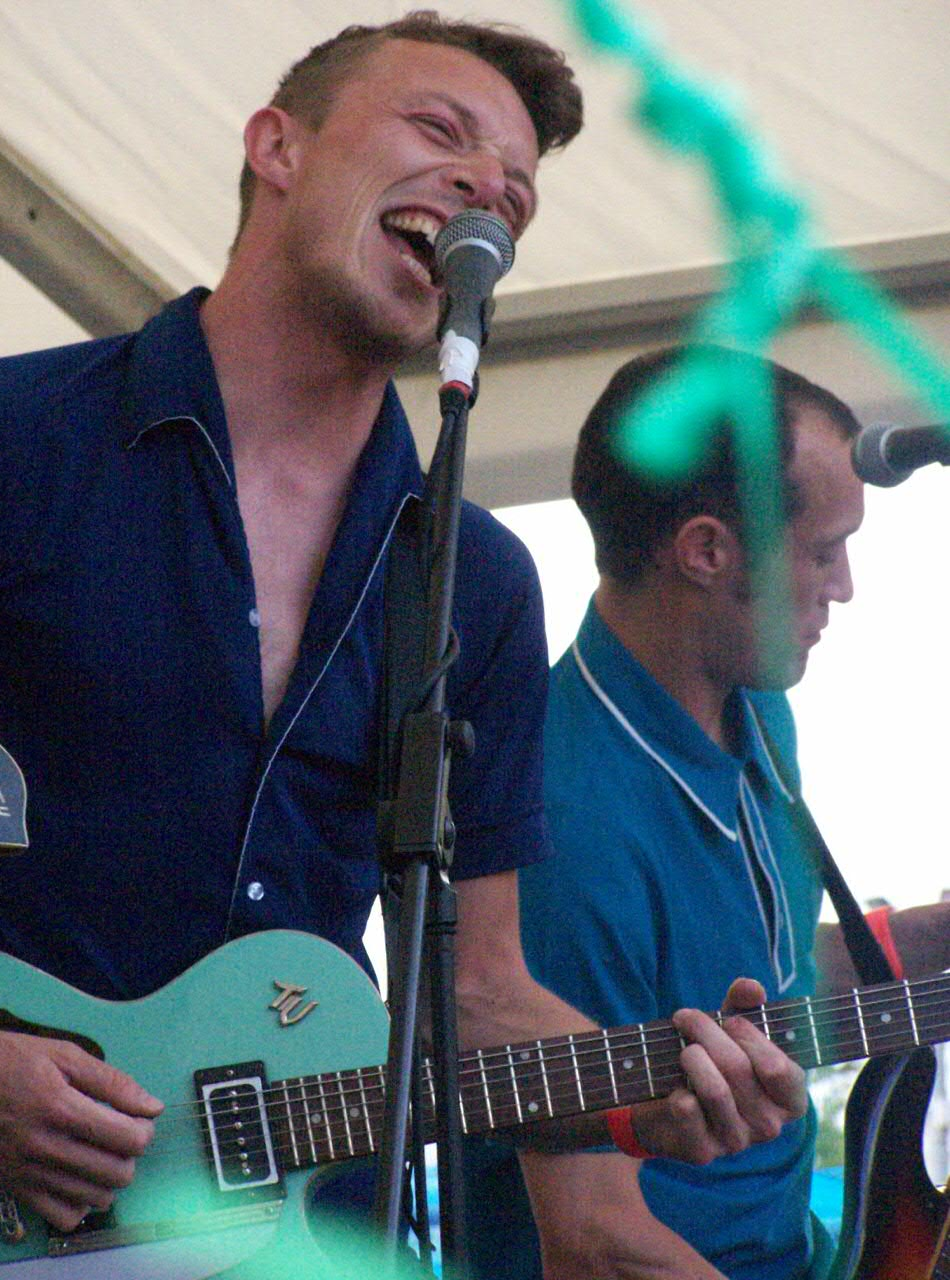
Lovatt and Dower with Uncle John & Whitelock, 2006

Uncle John & Whitelock was formed in 2001 by singer and guitarist, Jacob Lovatt, and bass player, Raydale Dower. The three-piece line-up was completed with the addition of Andrew Hobson on drums.

The band was expanded to a five-piece line-up in 2002 with the addition of drummer Matthew Black and keyboard player Nic Denholm, Hobson moving to guitar. Denholm and Hobson left in early 2005, Denholm later moving to London to form psychedelic/powerpop four-piece The Snap Elect. They were replaced by Jamie Bolland on keyboards and David Philp, formerly of Cannon, on guitar.

The band were supporters of the charity the Scottish Association for Mental Health, appearing on their One in Four CD. In October 2005, they appeared at an awareness-raising music festival in Ljubljana, Slovenia for World Mental Health Day.

The band maintained a heavy gigging and touring schedule from 2004 to 2006, playing with bands as diverse as Franz Ferdinand, Babyshambles and The Fall. Their final show was played on 23 December 2006 at King Tut's Wah Wah Hut in Glasgow.

Lovatt now fronts Jacob Yates and the Pearly Gate Lock Pickers; Dower, Black and Bolland play in Musique concrète ensemble Tut Vu Vu; and Philp in Gypsy folk combo Adopted as Holograph.

== Music and critical reception ==
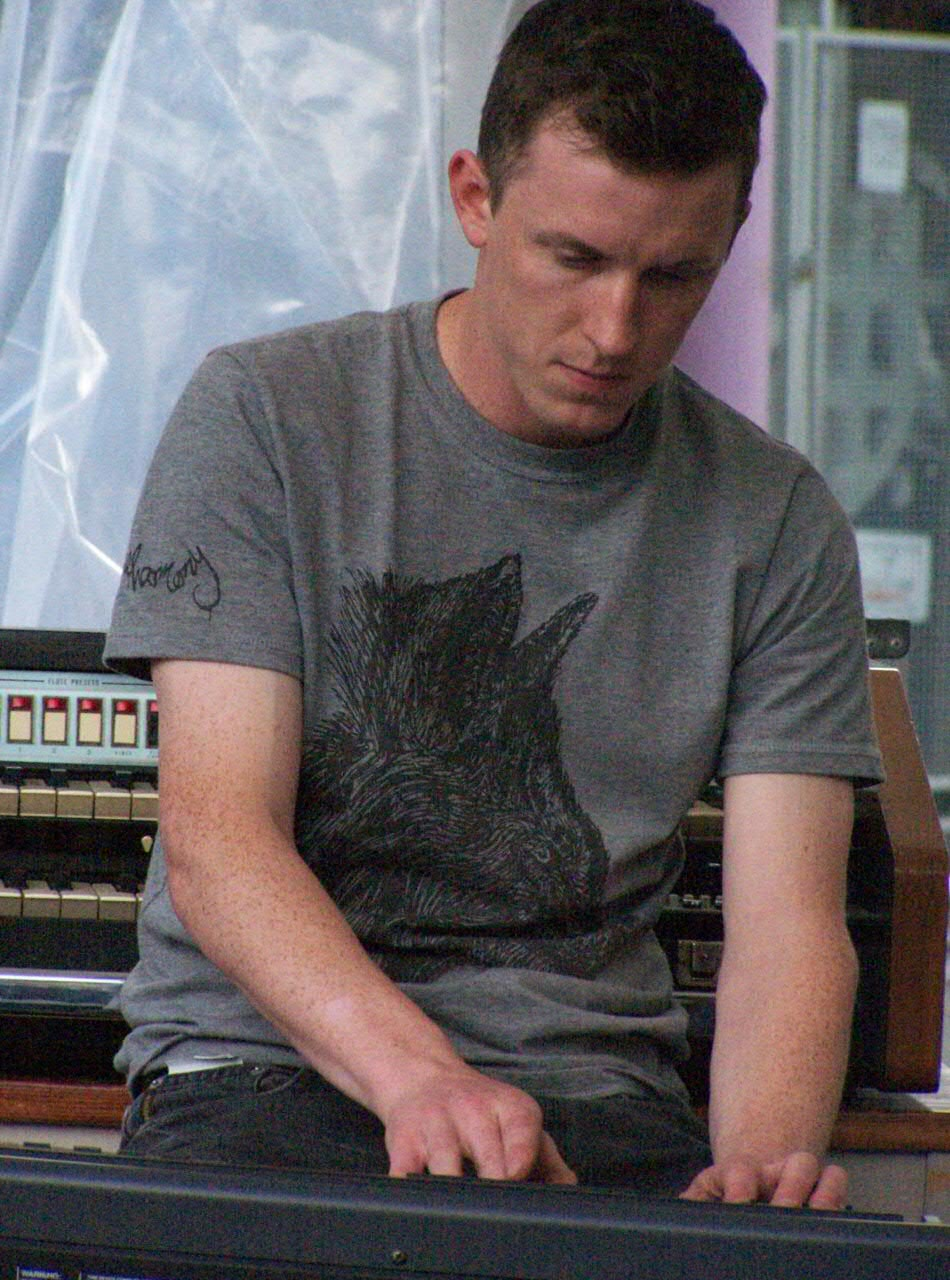
Jamie Bolland

"THERE'S a storm gathering, an apocalyptic thing raging on the horizon. Black clouds, wind that will be rattling your bones, rain that will sting your eyes, a storm that will engulf you. That's what Uncle John And Whitelock are like: the sound of the end times, the last howls of those who refuse to succumb."
– Review of There is Nothing Else, Sunday Herald.

The band quickly built a reputation for the originality of their live performances which incorporated elements of theatricality and performance art. These performances might see the band playing on stage inside a specially constructed wooden shack, unseen by the audience, or with scratchy black-and-white, 16 mm film projected over the band as they played, giving the impression of an old silent movie.

Live reviews often focused on Lovatt's stage presence, describing him for example as a 'demented frontman', or a 'crazed urban preacher', while the band as a whole were described as 'the best live band in Glasgow' and 'perhaps the best undiscovered band in Scotland'.

The music was described as 'steel-toed subterranean rock' and 'frighteningly visceral blues', and this blues sensibility, coupled with Lovatt's distinctive vocals, led to the band being compared with Dr John, Captain Beefheart, Tom Waits and Nick Cave, while their songs were noted for their disturbing and anarchistic content.

Their recorded output was well received by critics, with their album, There Is Nothing Else given a five star review by The Sunday Herald and placed at number 18 in The Skinny's Scottish Albums of the Decade, described as a 'strange and singular work in the canon of Scottish rock'. The band were championed by DJ Vic Galloway and their records were played regularly on BBC Radio Scotland and BBC Radio 1.

== Discography ==
There Is Nothing Else album cover

=== Studio albums ===
- There Is Nothing Else (2005) CD and gatefold double LP

=== EPs and singles ===
- Of dis dem a know nuttin – 10" vinyl (2003) screen-printed, stitched sleeve
- The Train – 7" vinyl (2004)
- 2 Fiddy – 7" vinyl (2005)
- Riverside/1879 (2006) 7" clear yellow vinyl

=== Compilations ===
- One in Four – Uncle John & Whitelock contributed the song The Train for charity release in aid of the Scottish Association of Mental Health.

=== DVDs ===
- The Absurd Uncle John & Whitelock in Black and White (2006) Filmed at Embassy gallery, Edinburgh, August 2005
