= Makethisrelate =

Scottish alternative rock band

MakethisRelate
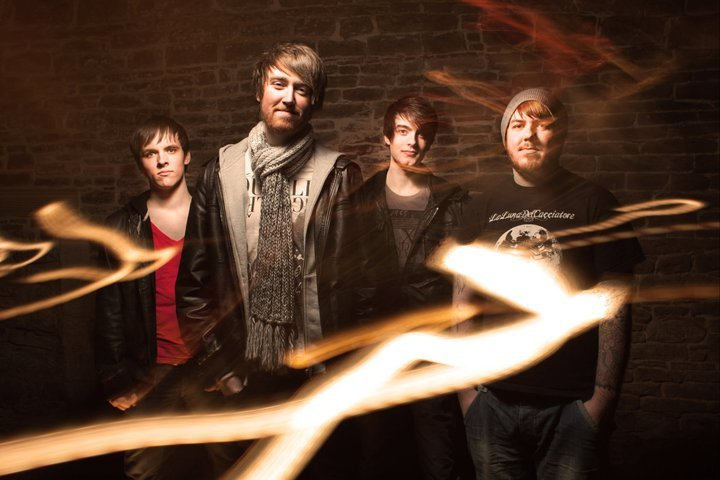
- MakethisRelate in 2011. From left to right: Aidan Scott, Kevin Wall and Dave McErlane

Background information
- Origin: Glasgow, Scotland
- Genres: Alternative, rock, pop
- Years active: 2008–2012
- Members: Kevin Walls; Aidan Scott; Danny Kelly; Dave McErlane

MakethisRelate was a Scottish four piece alternative rock band from Glasgow, Scotland.

== History ==
=== 2008-2009: Formation ===
The band formed in September 2008 whilst studying sound production at Cumbernauld College. After an impromptu jam session in the college studio the band decided to continue playing music together, initially as the backing band to Kevin's solo project at the time. After a year of playing gigs in pubs and youth centres in central Scotland, the band adopted the MakethisRelate moniker and began to work on their debut EP, Pick Your Side. In an interview with Alter The Press! the band stated the transition between Kevin's solo project and performing their own material "was a really natural progression". The band cite Jimmy Eat World and Biffy Clyro as two of their main influences.

=== 2009-2010: Pick Your Side ===
MakethisRelate recorded Pick Your Side over the summer of 2009 and released the four track EP on 10 September 2009. The EP's lead single, We'll Always Be Famous, found its way to a producer at 102.5 Clyde 1 who gave the song its first play on national radio. Physical copies of Pick Your Side sold out within a few months and the EP became popular in the Glasgow music scene.

=== 2010-2011: One More Second Chance ===
Following the success of Pick Your Side and support slots with Flood of Red, Rolo Tomassi and Ten Second Epic, the band's fan base increased. This led the band to bigger stages including the main stage at the O2 ABC Glasgow and a sold out show in King Tut's Wah Wah Hut with Twenty Twenty. The band described the experience with Twenty Twenty as an eye opening one which shattered many of their illusions of the music industry.

During the summer of 2010, the band began work on their second EP, One More Second Chance. The majority of One More Second Chance was recorded in a church in Motherwell and was of a slightly heavier sound than their first EP. This led to comparisons between One More Second Chance and Blackened Sky by Biffy Clyro. In September 2010, the band headlined the O2 ABC Glasgow and released One More Second Chance. The band went on to support Elliot Minor and completed their first mini tour before the end of 2010.

=== 2011 – present: Red Bull Bedroom Jam & Sugar Glass ===
MakethisRelate spent the beginning of 2011 working on their live show and played a number of gigs around Scotland. They also announced that they would embark on their first UK tour with Birmingham based band, Page 44, in May 2011. Over the summer of 2011, the band was announced as one of eight finalists in the Red Bull Bedroom Jam project and went on to perform at Download Festival, Sonisphere Festival, T in the Park and several other UK festivals. They also supported heavy metal supergroup The Damned Things at their show in The Garage, Glasgow. Guitarist, Dave McErlane, left the band during the festival season, citing personal reasons.

Off the back of their festival appearances, the band released the single, Sugar Glass on 22 August, which was mixed and mastered by Jason Wilson at Stakeout Studios (You Me At Six, We Are The Ocean, Fightstar) and then embarked on a short UK tour. The single received positive reviews from critics and was used by Front Magazine to soundtrack one of their videos.

As of March 2012 the band have announced an extended hiatus during which they will not be recording or performing live. The band reformed in 2013 for a free show in Glasgow on 25 September and shortly after re-entered the studio to work on previously unfinished material, but there has since been no activity from the group.

== Band members ==
Current members

- Kevin Walls – Lead vocals, guitar, piano (since 2008)
- Aidan Scott – Bass guitar, backing vocals (since 2008)
- Danny Kelly – Drums, backing vocals (since 2008)
- Dave McErlane – Guitar (since 2008)

== Discography ==
Extended plays

- Pick Your Side (2009)
- One More Second Chance (2010)

Singles

- Pick Your Side (2010)
- Sugar Glass (2011)
