= Jacob Yates and the Pearly Gate Lock Pickers =

Scottish band

- Origin: Glasgow, Scotland
- Genres: Rock and Roll, Rockabilly
- Years active: 2008–2024
- Labels: Lucky Number Nine, RE:PEATER, VaVa, Optimo Music, Errol's Hot Wax
- Members: Jake Lovatt - Guitar, vocals Richard Holmes - Bass; Christopher Haddow -Guitars; Jamie Bolland - Keyboards, Guitar; Michael Bleazard - Drums
- Website: Jacob Yates and the Pearly Gate Lock Pickers

Jacob Yates and the Pearly Gate Lock Pickers were a band from Glasgow, Scotland, fronted by Jake Lovatt, former front man with Uncle John & Whitelock. Taking many of the signature "Horror R&B" elements of the previous band with them, The Pearly Gate Lock Pickers' music has been described as Doom Wop.

== History ==
Jacob Yates and the Pearly Gate Lock Pickers were formed in 2007 by Jake Lovatt, former front man with Uncle John & Whitelock. The band was initially a three-piece, consisting of Lovatt on vocals and guitar, Ric Holmes on bass guitar and Michael Bleazard on drums. This lineup was later augmented by the addition of former Uncle John & Whitelock member, Jamie Bolland, on keyboards and guitar. In 2011, former Paper Planes guitarist Christopher Haddow was added to the lineup.

Their debut album, Luck, was released on 20 June 2011. The album was well-received, with the music described as "dark with a mischievous grin" and as having a "Mississippi-meets-Maryhill sound", drawing comparisons with Tom Waits, Nick Cave and The Cramps.

== Discography ==
=== Studio albums ===
- Luck (2011)
- GOTHS!!! (2016)
- The Hare, The Moon & The Drone (2018)
- MURDER 24/7 (2023)

=== Singles ===
- Mary Hell (2009)
- When You Left Me (2010)
- Can't Stop (2011)
- Lemonade (2011)
- Gospel According to The Selfish Gene (2016)
- Carehome (2016)
