= Laki Mera =

Scottish electronic band

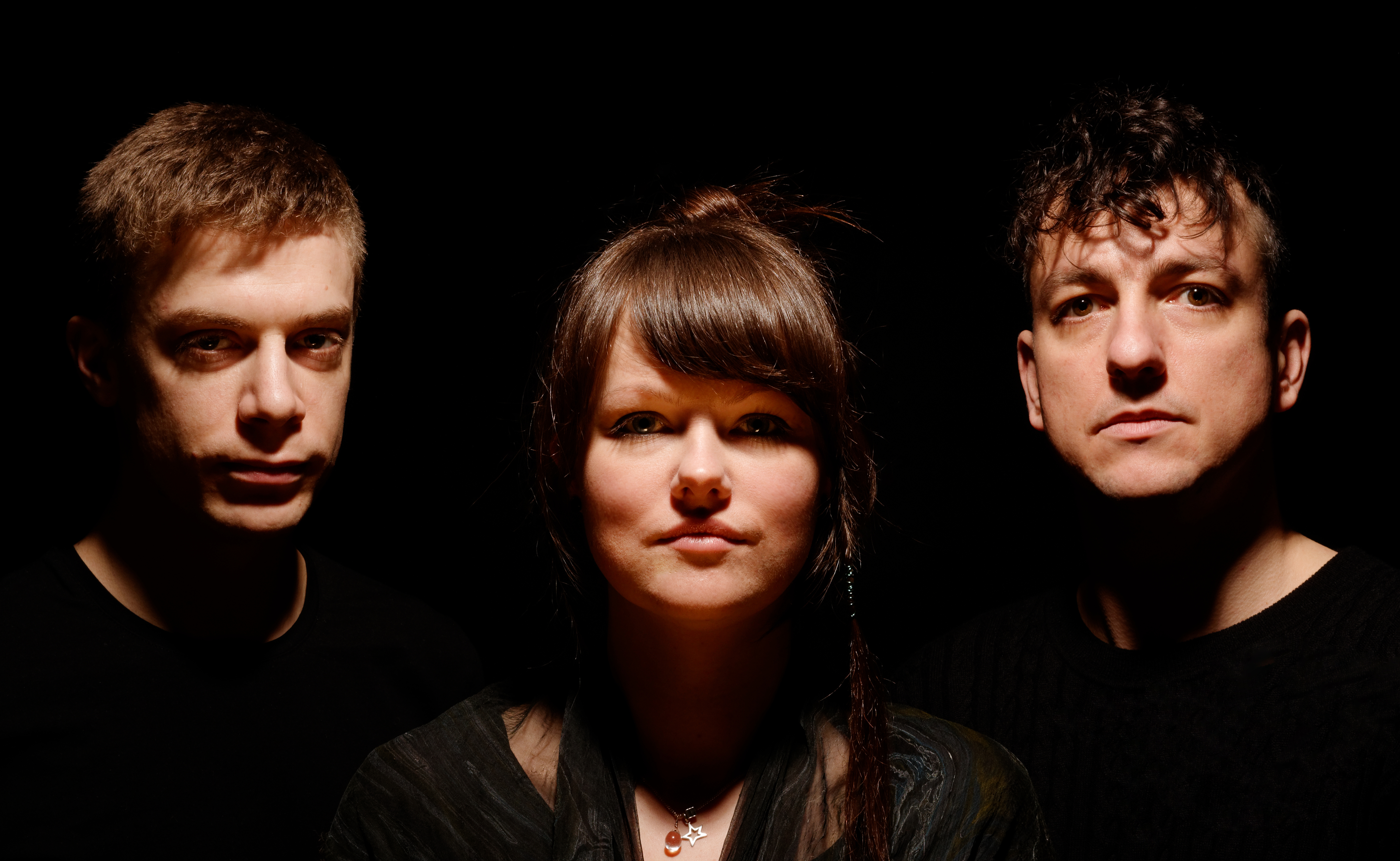
- Laki Mera

Background information
- Origin: Glasgow, Scotland
- Genres: Electronic, folktronica, trip hop
- Years active: 2004–present
- Labels: Rhythm of Life; Just Music
- Members: Andrea Gobbi - Programming, synths, guitars Laura Donnelly - Vocals, guitars, synths Keir Long - Programming, synths
- Past members: Trev Helliwell - Cello, synths Tim Harbinson - Drums

Laki Mera are a three-piece electronic band, based in Glasgow, Scotland.

== History ==
Formed in 2004 as a recording project by Andrea Gobbi and Laura Donnelly, Laki Mera took their name from the Chimaera of Greek mythology. The lineup was completed with the addition of pianist Keir Long, cellist Trevor Helliwell and drummer Tim Harbinson.

In December, 2007, the band announced that they would be offering their debut album, Clutter, free for download prior to its official release. The album was critically well received.

Their music has been variously described as folktronica, ambient trip hop, 'lush space jazz' and "pristine pop chamber music of the highest quality", as well as being reminiscent of Portishead and Massive Attack backing Cocteau Twin Liz Fraser'. They have been cited as "one of the most promising, intelligent pop acts Scotland has produced this decade".

== Discography ==
=== Studio albums ===
- Clutter (2008)
- The Proximity Effect (2011)
- Turn All Memory To White Noise (2013)

=== EPs ===
- Diet of Worms (2008)
- How Dare You Remix EP (2010)
- Clutter EP (2010)
- More Than You (2011)

=== Singles ===
- How Dare You (2007)
- More Than You (2011)
- Fool (2011)
- Crater (Mogwai remix) (2012)
- Sweet Warm Dance (2013)
