= Whitey (musician) =

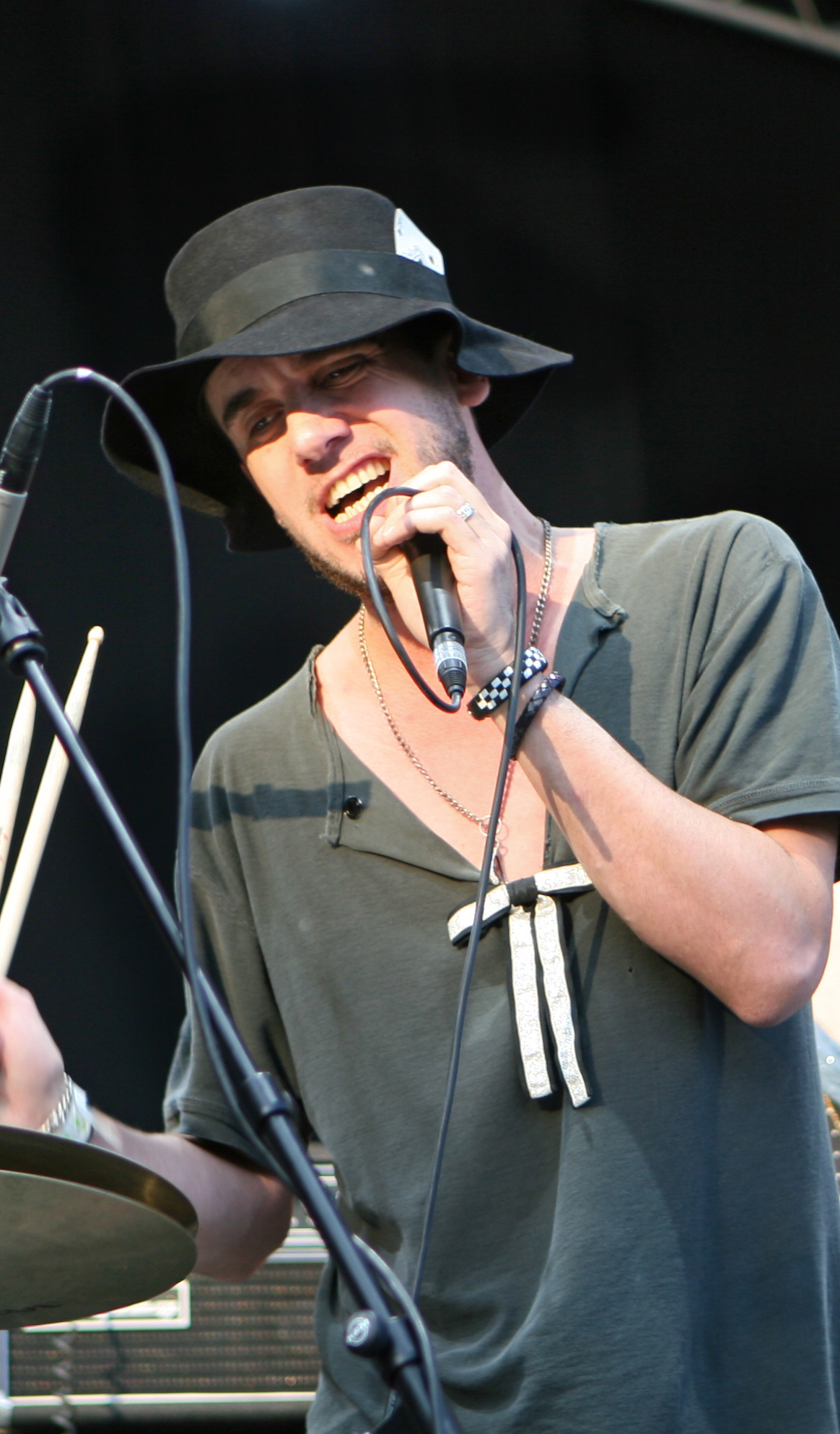
- Whitey performing in 2008

Background information
- Born: Nathan Joseph White
- Origin: Coventry, West Midlands, England
- Genres: Indie rock; dance-punk; post-punk revival; new rave; synth-pop; indietronica; experimental pop
- Years active: 2003–present
- Labels: No! Label, 1234, EMI, Marquis Cha Cha, Bad Life, Dim Mak Records

Nathan Joseph White, known by his stage name Whitey, is an English songwriter, musician, multi-instrumentalist and soundtrack composer. He works primarily in the alternative pop field, bringing in elements of pop, rock, classical and electronic; with influences from many other genres and mediums, for example, Charleston, swing, psychedelia, metal, acid house, cut-up poetry and found sounds. His sounds has been described to contain various styles of music such as alternative rock, bedroom pop, electronic, electronica, carnival, synthpop, indie rock, post-punk revival, neo-psychedelia, new wave and alternative dance. Tracks by Whitey have also featured in episodes of The Sopranos and Breaking Bad.

== Career ==
=== The Light at the End of the Tunnel is a Train and shelved albums (2005–2008) ===
In 2005, he released an album named The Light at the End of the Tunnel is a Train. Though he himself has subsequently distanced himself from the genre, this album predicted many elements of the 'electro-rock' movement by several years, and was greeted at the time as a critical triumph, going on to make numerous Best Of Year lists worldwide.

In the summer of 2007, an album named Great Shakes was leaked onto the internet, by an unidentified individual named Kelkoo182. As a consequence of this leak, this album was never officially released, and Whitey lost all international licensing deals. On 9 October 2007, the Wrap It Up EP was released through Pure Groove Music/Universal Music. It consisted of three songs: "Wrap It Up", "Cigarette", and "Head in the Corner". Other appearances since then have been the track "Stay on the Outside" on Kitsuné Maison Compilation 4, the release of the limited edition Made of Night EP on Marquis Cha Cha records and the track "Wrap It Up" was featured on Grand Theft Auto IV on the in-game radio station Radio Broker. A full album named Stay On The Outside was planned for release in the later part of 2008, but was delayed at this point by the artist. This album was planned to include a number of tracks from Great Shakes and a number of new tracks.

=== Canned Laughter, Great Shakes, Lost Summer, and Seven (2010–2015) ===
A new album Canned Laughter was self-released by Whitey on 1 April 2010, along with a public statement that the 'future of music is independent, and labels must learn to strike fairer deals to keep their slice'. He then withdrew all his music from Spotify and iTunes, but has since returned to these platforms.

On 23 March 2012, extended versions of The Light at the End of the Tunnel is a Train and Canned Laughter were independently released via Bandcamp, alongside the first official release of Great Shakes and a collection of rarities named "Great Shakes Volume 2." Music from this release has been used extensively in US TV and cinema. The song "Stay On the Outside" was used in episode two of the fifth season of Breaking Bad.

In May 2012, Whitey announced a surprise release- his new album "Lost Summer" was suddenly released a week later, independently on Bandcamp. The album went live for download on 18 May 2012.

In December 2012, Whitey started a Kickstarter campaign to fund his seventh album as well as making physical releases on CD and vinyl available for all his back catalog. The Kickstarter campaign ended well over the official goal. However, as of September 2018 no album had been released to those who had pledged funds to the campaign.

In November 2013, Whitey rejected a Betty TV request to license his music for free on the grounds that it was unreasonable to pay others professionally without paying to license music, reposting the email online to begin 'a public discussion... about this kind of industry abuse of musicians.' The post went viral overnight, generating 500,000 views in the first 24 hours, and reached an estimated audience of over 5 million views via retweeting/secondary views on Twitter. The requested discussion spread into the mainstream press, generating pieces in Music Week, The Guardian, the BBC and numerous online sources. Whitey recently passed his 15 millionth online play.

In March 2015, Whitey released "Seven," a mini-album consisting of seven songs crossing and blending seven multiple genres. Whitey also announced a new studio album titled "Square Peg, Round World", though this album was ultimately shelved.

=== Return to music (2020–present) ===
On 29 May 2020, Whitey released a Facebook post announcing his return to music, along with releases of all of his previous albums on CD, Vinyl and digital streaming platforms. A new album titled "Now That's Why I Killed Music", featuring previously unreleased or rare tracks, was released on 7 August 2020. Not long after, an Extended Version including 2 Unreleased tracks was released of the album as a Bandcamp exclusive.

On 25 October 2020, Whitey released his first EP since 2008, entitled The Times They Are Deranging E.P., containing 4 tracks, 2 of which originally were meant to appear on Square Peg, Round World. From 2020 to 2023, Whitey has also self-published 5 albums unreleased tracks and remastered demos from throughout his career, entitled Lost Songs.

On 30 January 2024, Whitey released a song entitled "Nothing in My Pocket But a Hole" on Bandcamp. Another song named "MON£Y $ONG" was also released on Bandcamp soon after, on 22 March 2024, and a music video for it was uploaded 14 days later, on 5 April 2024. These two songs were later revealed to be singles from Whitey's new album Nothing in My Pocket But a Hole, which was released on Bandcamp on 11 April 2024. Shortly afterward, a remastered version of the album was released on 3 May 2024. Both singles and the original album release on Bandcamp have since been deleted. Nothing in My Pocket But a Hole was later released on streaming services on 21 June 2024.

On 11 July 2024, Whitey announced his next album, Mental Radio, scheduled to be released on 3 October 2024, along with a double A-side single, "Cherryade / When Did I Lay Down and Die?". The tracklist for the album was released on 1 August 2024.

== Discography ==
Studio albums

- The Light at the End of the Tunnel Is a Train (2005)
- Great Shakes (2007)
- Canned Laughter (2010)
- Lost Summer (2012)
- Seven (2015)
- Now That's Why I Killed Music (2020)
- Nothing in My Pocket But a Hole (2024)
- Mental Radio (2024)

Lost Songs series

- Lost Songs Volume 1: Berlin (2020)
- Lost Songs Volume 2: Bohemia Road (2021)
- Lost Songs Volume 3: Wrong Destination (2021)
- Lost Songs Volume 4: 2003-2021 (2021)
- Lost Songs Volume 5: Let's Never Go Home Again (2023)
- Lost Songs Volume 6: Life Support (2024)
