= The Martini Henry Rifles =

British noise-punk band

- Origin: Cardiff, Wales
- Genres: Noise, punk
- Label: FF Vinyl

The Martini Henry Rifles were a British punk band based in Cardiff, Wales.

== Influences and genre classification ==
Drowned In Sound likened them to fellow Cardiff band Mclusky, as well as ...And You Will Know Us by the Trail of Dead, while Western Telegraph described their album's sound as "Albini-PIL-Superchunk-Pussy Galore howls of pure pop noise fury". Manchester Evening News described the band's live show as "a a sugar rush of Dead Kennedys' bile, Ikara Colt's thrash and Beastie Boys attitude". More Mclusky and Ikara Colt comparisons came from Uncut, which grouped them in with "2002’s scuzzy punk uprising" of which those acts were a part.

== History of the band ==
In 2003, the band signed with the independent label FF Vinyl. The BBC reported that the band had requested that their contract be signed at a lapdancing club called Fantasy Lounge.

They released the album Superbastard in November 2004.

In February 2005 the band released Slash The Seats (Culprit One Remixes) as the fourth single from Superbastard, which the South Wales Argus described as a move "towards a richer, more produced sound".

In May 2005, the band's BBC Radio 1 live session prompted complaints from a Romani support group. The BBC's Editorial Complaints Unit concluded that the inclusion of a track called Gyppo kids ate my hamster on their website was a mistake.
