= Sputniks Down =

Scottish post-rock band

- Origin: Glasgow, Scotland
- Genres: Post-rock
- Years active: 1996–2003; 2010–present
- Label: Human Condition Records
- Members: Andrew Blue; David Roy; Martyn Healy

Sputniks Down are a Scottish band. Signed to Edinburgh's Human Condition Records, Sputniks Down (named after a song by Lou Barlow's Folk Implosion) were a three piece from Bishopbriggs on the outskirts of Glasgow. They produced instrumental electronica with 'Eno-esque gorgeousness'. 'The Young Marble Giants stepping out with a prozac-ed up Godspeed You! Black Emperor while the Mary Chain bite their ankles'. Influences also included such bands as Tortoise and Mogwai.

They were one of the first bands from the UK (along with fellow Glaswegians Mogwai) to play instrumental, post-rock and subsequently formed an important part of the early 2000s Glasgow music scene.

== Career ==
After a handful of gigs, they were signed to Edinburgh's Human Condition record label. In January 2000, their debut EP Monotone Mountain was recorded by Tony Doogan at CaVa Studios. At the time, they were highly thought of by Keith Cameron (NME), Roy Wilkinson (Select) and Vic Galloway (BBC Radio 1 Evening Session). 'MM' was described as 'an electropopguitary lullaby'. The EP was released on 17 April 2000. The gig to celebrate the EP launch on 27 April 2000 in Avalanche, Edinburgh was reviewed by the NME.

In 2001 they released their debut album, Much Was Decided Before You Were Born. The songs "Atonement" and "Mie Scattering" featured artists from El Hombre Trajaedo and Long Fin Killie (Luke Sutherland).

The band played a six date tour later that year, including gigs in London (Dublin Castle), Norwich (FerryBoat), Aberdeen (Glow303/Lava/Kef) and the Life Without Buildings album launch in Glasgow. They undertook a live session for BBC Scotland, along with Brendan O'Hare, and took part in the 2001 Planet Pop Festival, and the Burnt Out Electronica Festival.

Their presence at a David Pajo gig in 2002 in Glasgow was reported by the NME. Live, they were described by one journalist as "almost triphop with an Aphex Twin feel while the slower stuff broods with a smoky almost film-noir feel as guitars chime and keyboards swirl". The same year they supported Mull Historical Society, American Analog Set and Fly Pan Am.

In late 2002, they were listed in Martin C. Strong's The Great Scots Discography.

After a tour of Greece in 2003, the band split up.

David Roy went on to play in Multiplies, and was a founder member of Dananananaykroyd.

In April 2010, it was announced that the band was reforming.

== Personnel ==
- Andrew Blue (bass)
- David Roy (guitar)
- Martyn Healy (keyboard)

== Discography ==
=== Studio albums ===
- Much Was Decided Before You Were Born (2003)

=== Compilations ===
- Handbags At Dawn (2002)
- Big Issue (2002)
- Electronikshire (2001)
- Pleasures From an Unknown Planet (2001)

=== EPs ===
- Monotone Mountain (2000)
- Athens EP (2003) - Exclusively made for Athens gig

=== Singles ===
- "Pixelated" (2002) - & El Hombre Trajeado; Sardines (UK 2 track 7" split - SGC011) (2001)
- "Much Was Decided Before You Were Born" (2001)
- "Monotone Mountain"
- "Pixelated"
- "Big Issue Compilation"
- "Pleasures from an Unknown Planet"
- "Handbags at Dawn"
- "Electronikshire.jpg"

== Sources ==
- Strong, M. (2002). The Great Scots Musicography: Mercat Press. ISBN 1-84183-041-0
