= Proximity effect (audio) =

Increase in bass based on proximity to a mic

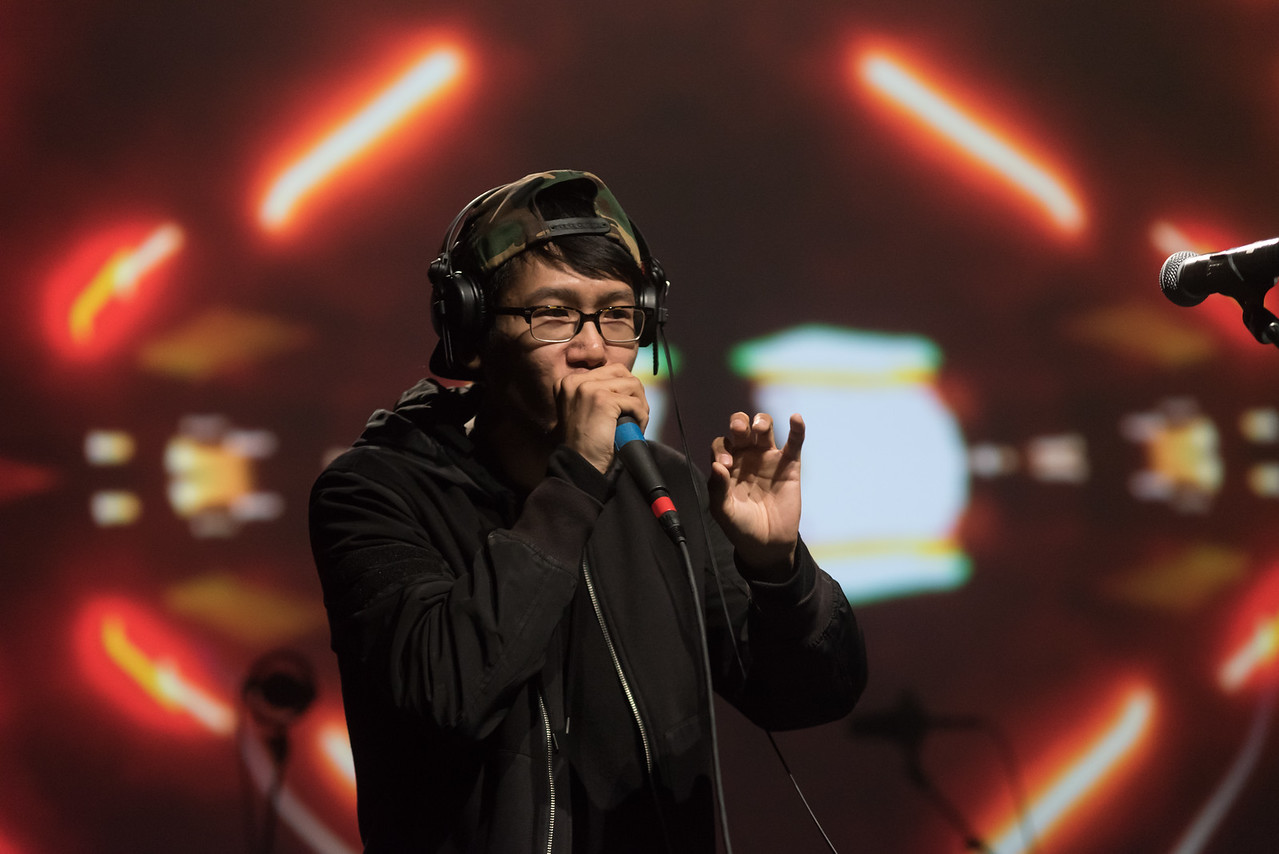
In the hip hop vocal style known as "beatboxing", performers take advantage of the way a closely positioned microphone boosts bass response in their vocal renditions of electric bass parts and bass drum parts. Pictured is beatboxer Sung Lee.

The proximity effect in audio is an increase in bass or low frequency response when a sound source is close to a cardioid or similar directional microphone. Proximity effect is a change in the frequency response of a directional pattern microphone that results in an emphasis on lower frequencies. It is caused by the use of ports to create directional polar pickup patterns, so omni-directional microphones do not exhibit the effect (this is not necessarily true of the "omni" pattern on multipattern condenser mics, which create the "omni" pattern by summing two back-to-back cardioid capsules, which may or may not share a common backplate.)

Proximity effect can be viewed in two ways. In some settings, sound engineers may view it as undesirable, and so the type of microphone or microphone practice may be chosen in order to reduce the proximity effect. On the other hand, some microphone users seek to intentionally use the proximity effect, such as beat boxing singers in hip hop music.

== Technical explanation ==
A ready (and common) example of proximity effect can be observed with cardioid dynamic vocal microphones (though it is not limited to this class of microphone) when the vocalist is very close to or even touching the mic with their lips. The effect is heard as a 'fattening up' of the voice. Many radio broadcast microphones are large diameter cardioid pickup pattern microphones, and radio announcers are often observed to employ proximity effect, adding a sense of gravitas and depth to the voice. Proximity effect is sometimes referred to as "bass tip-up."

=== Angular dependence ===
To explain how the proximity effect arises in directional microphones, it is first necessary to briefly describe how a directional microphone works. A microphone is constructed with a diaphragm whose mechanical movement is converted to electrical signals (via a magnetic coil, for example). The movement of the diaphragm is a function of the air pressure difference across the diaphragm arising from incident sound waves. In a directional microphone, sound reflected from surfaces behind the diaphragm is permitted to impinge on the rear side of the diaphragm. Since the sound reaching the rear of the diaphragm travels slightly farther than the sound at the front, it is slightly out of phase. The greater this phase difference, the greater the pressure difference and the greater the diaphragm movement. As the sound source moves off the diaphragm axis, this phase difference decreases due to decreasing path length difference. This is what gives a directional microphone its directivity.

In addition to the angular dependence described above, the response of a directional microphone depends on the amplitude, frequency and distance of the source. These latter two dependencies are used to explain the proximity effect.

== Phase difference ==
As described above, the phase difference across the diaphragm gives rise to the pressure difference that moves the diaphragm. This phase difference increases with frequency as the difference in path length becomes a larger portion of the wavelength of the sound. This frequency dependence is offset by damping the diaphragm 6 dB per octave to achieve a flat frequency response (but this is not germane to the proximity effect so nothing more will be said about it here). The point to be made regarding the frequency dependency is that the phase difference across the diaphragm is the smallest at low frequencies.

== Amplitude difference ==
In addition to phase differences, amplitude differences also result in pressure differences across the diaphragm. This amplitude component arises from the fact that the far side of the diaphragm is farther from the sound source than the front side. Since sound pressure level decreases as the inverse of the distance from the source (it is sound intensity level that drops as the inverse of the distance squared, for those familiar with the inverse square law), the amplitude of the sound will be slightly less at the rear of the diaphragm as compared to the front of the diaphragm. Since the pressure difference due to the amplitude component is dependent only on the amplitude differential with respect to the two sides of the diaphragm, it is independent of frequency.

The properties of the amplitude component that are applicable to the proximity effect are that the contribution to the pressure difference is small and independent of frequency. At large distances between the source and the microphone, the amplitude component of the pressure difference is negligible compared to the phase component at all audio frequencies. As the source is brought closer to the directional microphone, the amplitude component of the pressure difference increases and becomes the dominant component at lower frequencies (recall that the phase component is relatively small at the low frequencies). At higher frequencies, the phase component of the pressure difference continues to dominate for all practical distances between source and microphone.

The result is that the frequency response of the microphone changes; specifically, it increases at the low frequency (bass) end, as the audio source is brought closer to the microphone. This is the proximity effect as it pertains to audio.
