= Continental jazz =

Music genre

Continental jazz was a genre of music that included early jazz dance bands of Europe in the swing medium, to the exclusion of Great Britain. The genre was generally practiced until the conclusion of World War II. By the time bebop came to popularity, the style became more or less obsolete.

== Revival trends ==
In the 1990s and 2000s, some ensembles on the European continent revived this style. Paris Combo draws on this style and others.
