= Teenage Fanclub discography =

Band discography

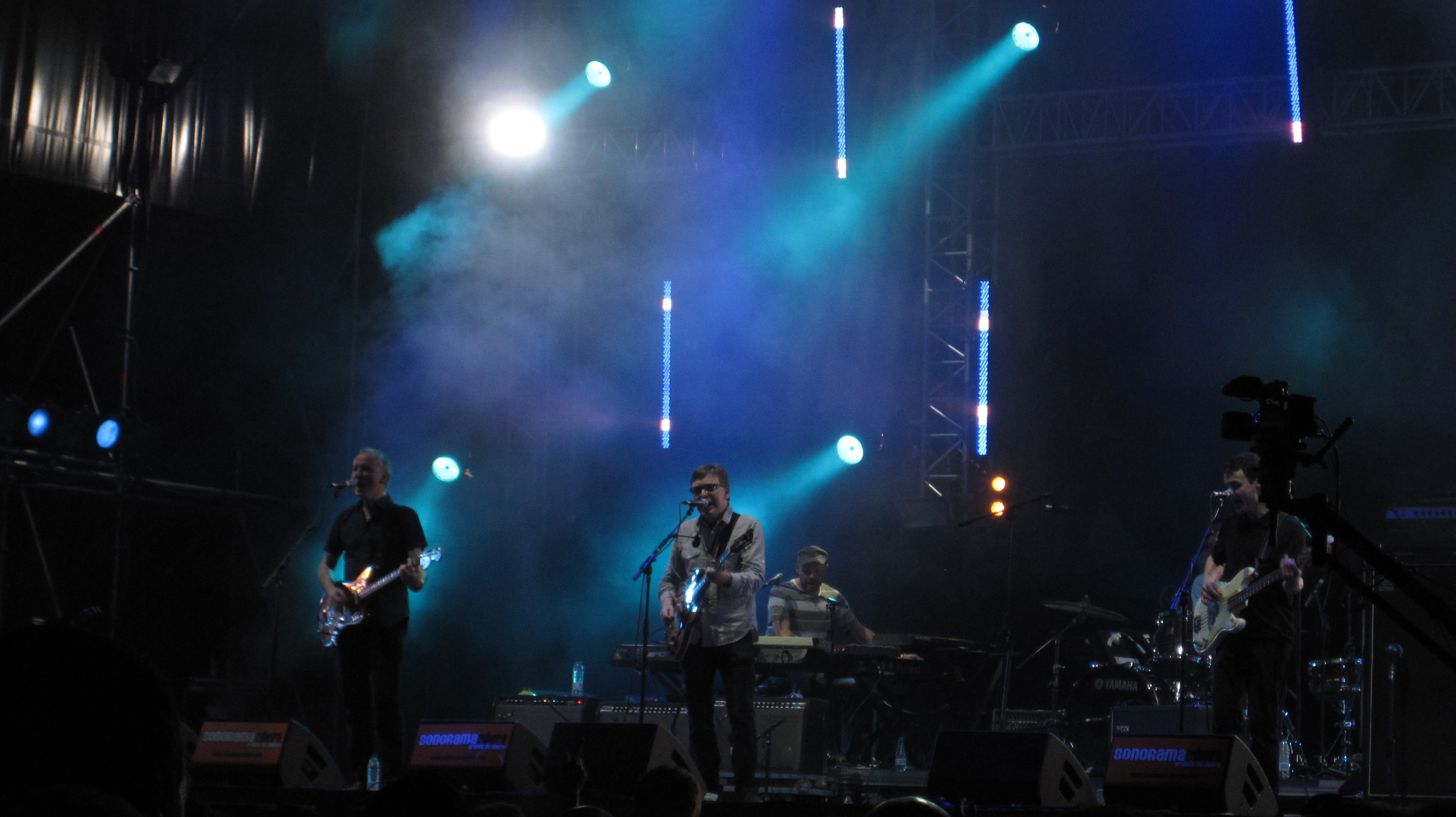
- Teenage Fanclub performing in 2011 in Burgos, Spain
- Studio albums: 13
- EPs: 2
- Compilation albums: 2
- Singles: 33

The discography of Teenage Fanclub, a Scottish rock band, consists of 13 studio albums, two compilation album, two extended plays and 33 singles.

== Albums ==
=== Studio albums ===
List of studio albums
Title	Details	Peak chart positions		
Title	Details	UK	AUS	US
A Catholic Education	Released: 11 June 1990; Label: Paperhouse; Format: CD, CS, DL, LP	—	—	—
The King	Released: 27 August 1991; Label: Creation; Format: CD, DL, LP	53	—	—
Bandwagonesque	Released: 4 November 1991; Label: Creation; Format: CD, CS, DL, LP	22	116	137
Thirteen	Released: 4 October 1993; Label: Creation; Format: CD, CS, DL, LP	14	103	—
Grand Prix	Released: 29 May 1995; Label: Creation; Format: CD, CS, DL, LP	7	57	—
Songs from Northern Britain	Released: 29 July 1997; Label: Creation; Format: CD, CS, DL, LP, MD	3	70	—
Howdy!	Released: 23 October 2000; Label: Columbia; Format: CD, DL, LP	33	—	—
Man-Made	Released: May 2005; Label: PeMa; Format: CD, DL, LP	34	174	—
Shadows	Released: 31 May 2010; Label: PeMa; Format: CD, DL, LP	30	—	—
Here	Released: 9 September 2016; Label: PeMa; Format: CD, CS, DL, LP	10	193	—
Endless Arcade	Released: 30 April 2021; Label: PeMa; Format: CD, CS, DL, LP	11	—	—
Nothing Lasts Forever	Released: 22 September 2023; Label: PeMa; Format: CD, CS, DL, LP	30	—	—
Do Not Dare to Dream	Released: 9 October 2026; Label: Merge; Format: CD, CS, DL, LP	—	—	—
"—" denotes a release that did not chart.

=== Collaboration albums ===
List of collaboration albums
Title	Details	Peak chart positions
Title	Details	UK
Words of Wisdom and Hope (with Jad Fair)	Released: 4 March 2002; Label: Geographic, Domino; Format: CD, DL, LP	159

=== Compilation albums ===
List of compilation albums
Title	Details	Peak chart positions	
Title	Details	UK	AUS
Deep Fried Fanclub	Released: February 1995; Label: Fire; Format: CD, DL, LP	—	
Four Thousand Seven Hundred and Sixty-Six Seconds – A Short Cut to Teenage Fanclub	Released: 27 January 2003; Label: Poolside; Format: CD, DL	47	104
"—" denotes a release that did not chart.

== Singles and EPs ==
Title	Release date	Chart positions		
Title	Release date	UK	AUS	US Alt
"Everything Flows"	June 1990 (UK)/1991 (US)	-	-	-
"Everybody's Fool"	November 1990	-	-	-
"The Ballad of John & Yoko"	October 1990	108	-	-
God Knows It's True (EP)	November 1990	99	-	-
"Star Sign"	August 1991	44	187	4
"The Concept"	October 1991	51	110	12
"The Peel Sessions"	November 1991	-	-	-
"What You Do to Me"	May 1992	31	158	19
"Free Again"	May 1992	-	-	-
"Radio"	June 1993	31	-	-
"Norman 3"	September 1993	50	-	-
"Hang On"	February 1994	-	68	19
"Fallin'" (with De La Soul)	March 1994	59	190	-
"Mellow Doubt"	March 1995	34	121	-
"Sparky's Dream"	May 1995	40	108	-
"The John Peel Session" (with Frank Black)	August 1995	98	-	-
"Neil Jung"	August 1995	62	-	-
Teenage Fanclub Have Lost It (EP)	December 1995	53	133	-
"Ain't That Enough"	June 1997	17	182	-
"I Don't Want Control of You"	August 1997	43	-	-
"Start Again"	November 1997	54	-	-
"Long Shot"	June 1998	-	-	-
"I Need Direction"	October 2000	48	-	-
"Dumb Dumb Dumb"	June 2001	-	-	-
"Near to You" (with Jad Fair)	2002	68	-	-
"Did I Say"	2002	-	-	-
"Association" (International Airport / Teenage Fanclub)	August 2004	75	-	-
"Scotland on Sunday"	April 2005	-	-	-
"Fallen Leaves" (Limited to 2,000 copies)	May 2005	78	-	-
"It's All in My Mind"	November 2005	-	-	-
"Baby Lee"	April 2010	-	-	-
"I'm in Love"	June 2016	-	-	-
"Everything Is Falling Apart"	February 2019	-	-	-
"Home"	November 2020	-	-	-
"I'm More Inclined"	January 2021	-	-	-
"The Sun Won't Shine On Me"	March 2021	-	-	-
"Foreign Land"	May 2023	-	-	-
"Back to the Light"	August 2023	-	-	-
"—" denotes a release that did not chart.

== Other appearances ==
Title	Year	Album
"Mr. Tambourine Man" (Bob Dylan cover)	1992	Ruby Trax – The NME's Roaring Forty
"Mad Dog 20/20"	1994	DGC Rarities Vol. 1
"It's So Hard to Fall in Love" (Sebadoh cover)	1995	Vox Presents The Radio 1 FM Sessions Volume 2
