= Four Thousand Seven Hundred and Sixty-Six Seconds – A Short Cut to Teenage Fanclub =

Greatest hits album by Teenage Fanclub
- Released: 27 January 2003
- Recorded: 1989–2002
- Studio: Various
- Genre: Alternative rock
- Length: 79:26
- Labels: Poolside (UK); Jetset (US)
- Producers: Teenage Fanclub; Don Fleming; Paul Chisholm; David Bianco; Nick Brine; Andy Macpherson

Teenage Fanclub chronology
| Words of Wisdom and Hope (2002) | Four Thousand Seven Hundred and Sixty-Six Seconds – A Short Cut to Teenage Fanclub (2003) | Man-Made (2005) |

Professional ratings
Review scores
| Source | Rating |
|---|---|
| AllMusic | 4.5/5 stars |
| The A.V. Club | (favourable) |
| Encyclopedia of Popular Music | 4/5 stars |
| Pitchfork | 8.6/10 |
| Stylus Magazine | A |

Four Thousand Seven Hundred And Sixty-Six Seconds – A Short Cut To Teenage Fanclub is a greatest hits album by the Scottish alternative rock band Teenage Fanclub, released on 27 January 2003. The title refers to the album's total length, just 34 seconds short of the maximum running time possible on a single CD: as a consequence the tracks "The Concept", "Star Sign" and "My Uptight Life" were edited from their original versions in order to fit on to the album. "Everything Flows" was remixed for this collection.

The album comprises 14 singles, four album tracks, and three new songs written for the album. It reached No. 47 in the UK album charts.

== Track listing ==
| No. | Title | Writer(s) | Original release | Length |
|---|---|---|---|---|
| 1. | "The Concept" | Norman Blake | Bandwagonesque (1991) | 5:36 |
| 2. | "Ain't That Enough" | Gerard Love | Songs from Northern Britain (1997) | 3:43 |
| 3. | "The World'll Be OK" | Raymond McGinley | New track | 4:26 |
| 4. | "Everything Flows" (remix) | Blake | A Catholic Education (1990) | 5:16 |
| 5. | "Star Sign" (single version) (edit) | Love | Bandwagonesque | 3:53 |
| 6. | "Mellow Doubt" | Blake | Grand Prix (1995) | 2:42 |
| 7. | "I Need Direction" | Love | Howdy! (2000) | 4:11 |
| 8. | "About You" | McGinley | Grand Prix | 2:41 |
| 9. | "What You Do to Me" | Blake | Bandwagonesque | 1:58 |
| 10. | "Empty Space" | Love | New track | 4:33 |
| 11. | "Sparky's Dream" | Love | Grand Prix | 3:15 |
| 12. | "I Don't Want Control of You" | Blake | Songs from Northern Britain | 3:08 |
| 13. | "Hang On" | Love | Thirteen (1993) | 5:05 |
| 14. | "Did I Say" | Blake | New track | 2:24 |
| 15. | "Don't Look Back" | Love | Grand Prix | 3:41 |
| 16. | "Your Love Is the Place Where I Come From" | McGinley | Songs from Northern Britain | 3:28 |
| 17. | "Neil Jung" | Blake | Grand Prix | 4:47 |
| 18. | "Radio" | Love | Thirteen | 2:55 |
| 19. | "Dumb Dumb Dumb" | Blake | Howdy! | 3:18 |
| 20. | "Planets" | Blake, Francis Macdonald | Songs from Northern Britain | 2:51 |
| 21. | "My Uptight Life" (edit) | McGinley | Howdy! | 5:25 |

== Personnel ==
Credits are adapted from the album liner notes.

See original albums for full credits.

Teenage Fanclub

- Norman Blake – vocals, guitar (1–21)
- Gerard Love – vocals, bass (1–21)
- Raymond McGinley – vocals, guitar (1–21)
- Finlay Macdonald – keyboards (3, 7, 10, 14, 19, 21)
- Brendan O'Hare – drums (1, 4, 5, 9)
- Paul Quinn – drums (2, 6–8, 11, 12, 15–17, 19–21)
- Francis Macdonald – drums (3, 10, 14)

Technical

- Teenage Fanclub – producer (1–21), remixing (4)
- Don Fleming – producer (1, 5, 9)
- Paul Chisholm – producer (1, 5, 9)
- David Bianco – producer (2, 6, 8, 11, 12, 15–17, 20)
- Andy Macpherson – producer (13, 18)
- Nick Brine – producer (3, 10, 14), remixing (4)
- Steve Rooke – mastering
- Scott King – art direction, design
- Donald Milne – cover concept, cover photography
- Norman Blake, Raymond McGinley, Sharon Fitzgerald – photography (booklet)
- Alan McGee, Chas Banks, Dave Barker, David Bianco, Don Fleming, Stephen Pastel, Peter Mason – liner notes

New tracks (tracks 3, 10, 14)

- John McCusker – violin, viola
- Isobel Campbell – cello
- Nick Brine – engineer
- Darren Simpson – assistant engineer (Parr Street)
- Mike Cave – assistant engineer (Parr Street) )
- James Morgan – assistant engineer (Rockfield)
- Jason Harris – assistant engineer (Rockfield)
- Recorded at Parr Street Studios, Liverpool and Rockfield Studios, Rockfield, Wales. Mixed at Rockfield.

== Charts ==
| Chart (2003) | Peak position |
|---|---|
| UK Albums (OCC) | 47 |
