= Teenage Fanclub Have Lost It =

EP by Teenage Fanclub
- Released: 11 December 1995
- Recorded: October 1995
- Studio: Raymond's house (Glasgow); Riverside (Busby, Scotland)
- Genre: Indie rock; alternative rock
- Length: 16:41
- Label: Creation
- Producer: Teenage Fanclub; Duncan Cameron

Teenage Fanclub chronology
Grand Prix (1995)	Teenage Fanclub Have Lost It (1995)	Songs from Northern Britain (1997)

Professional ratings
Review scores
Source	Rating
AllMusic	4/5 stars

Teenage Fanclub Have Lost It is an EP by Scottish alternative rock band Teenage Fanclub, released in December 1995 on Creation Records. It reached No. 53 in the UK singles chart.

The EP consists of acoustic versions of four previously recorded songs, one from each of their previous four major studio albums. The EP's title is an allusion to the fact that these songs are acoustic versions, stripped of their usual instrumentation and amplification.

== Background ==
It was Teenage Fanclub's label, Creation Records, that suggested releasing an acoustic EP. "I think they had an idea of maybe us with a string section, a classy kind of thing," guitarist Raymond McGinley recalled in 2017. "And we thought, "Oh no, that sounds terrible." But we thought, "Maybe we could do something like that, but our way." The title was meant as a joke, "because we thought bands go away and they make an acoustic version of the records, and it's like bands have lost it when they do this kind of thing," McGinley said. He described the EP as "trying to take a kind of shit concept but do something that musically works."

== Track listing ==
No.	Title	Writer(s)	Length
1.	"Don't Look Back" (original version on Grand Prix, 1995)	Gerard Love	3:22
2.	"Everything Flows" (original version on A Catholic Education, 1990)	Norman Blake	5:31
3.	"Starsign" (original version on Bandwagonesque, 1991)	Love	4:57
4.	"120 Minutes" (original version on Thirteen, 1993)	Raymond McGinley	2:51

== Personnel ==
Adapted from the EP's liner notes.

Teenage Fanclub

- Norman Blake – vocals, melodica, acoustic guitar, Ibanez analog delay, treble recorder, harmonica, Roland MS-1 sampler, drums
- Gerard Love – vocals, electric bass, acoustic guitar, five-string banjo, classical guitar, crotales, flageolet, Vox organ
- Raymond McGinley – vocals, acoustic guitar, slide guitar, Ibanez analog delay
- Paul Quinn – drums, shaker, synthesizer, tambourine

Technical

- Teenage Fanclub – producer
- Duncan Cameron – producer, engineer
- Nick Webb – mastering
- Toby Egelnick – sleeve layout
