= Deep Fried Fanclub =

Compilation album by Teenage Fanclub
- Released: February 1995
- Recorded: 1989–1991
- Studios: Suite 16, Rochdale; Pet Sounds, Glasgow; Fun City, New York City; Amazon, Liverpool
- Genre: Alternative rock
- Length: 34:56
- Label: Fire
- Producers: Teenage Fanclub; Don Fleming

Teenage Fanclub chronology
Thirteen (1993)	Deep Fried Fanclub (1995)	Grand Prix (1995)

Professional ratings
Review scores
Source	Rating
AllMusic	3/5 stars

Deep Fried Fanclub is a rarities compilation album by the Scottish alternative rock band Teenage Fanclub, released in 1995. It mostly features non-album singles and b-sides released through the band's association with Paperhouse and K Records.

== Track listing ==
No.	Title	Writer(s)	Original release	Length
1.	"Everything Flows"	Norman Blake	Single, 1990	5:11
2.	"Primary Education"	Blake	B-Side from "Everything Flows", 1990	2:46
3.	"Speeeder"	Blake, Raymond McGinley	B-Side from "Everything Flows", 1990	1:28
4.	"Critical Mass (Original)"	Blake	Previously unreleased; different version released on A Catholic Education, 1990	3:04
5.	"The Ballad of John and Yoko"	John Lennon, Paul McCartney	Single, 1990	3:03
6.	"God Knows It's True"	Blake	Single, 1990	4:53
7.	"Weedbreak"	Blake, McGinley, Gerard Love, Brendan O'Hare	B-Side from "God Knows It's True", 1990	2:34
8.	"So Far Gone"	Love	B-Side from "God Knows It's True", 1990	3:17
9.	"Ghetto Blaster"	Blake, McGinley, Love, O'Hare	B-Side from "God Knows It's True", 1990	1:49
10.	"Don't Cry No Tears"	Neil Young	B-Side from "Everything Flows" CD-single, 1991	2:29
11.	"Free Again"	Alex Chilton	Single, 1992	2:13
12.	"Bad Seed"	Beat Happening	B-Side from "Free Again", 1992	2:04

== Personnel ==
Credits adapted from the album's liner notes.

- Norman Blake – guitar, vocals
- Gerard Love – bass, vocals
- Raymond McGinley – guitar, vocals
- Brendan O'Hare – drums
- Francis MacDonald – drums

Production

- Teenage Fanclub – production [1–10]
- Don Fleming – production [5–12]
- Ted Blakeway – engineering [4]
- Wharton Tiers – engineering [5–10]
- Paul Chisholm – engineering [11–12]
- Keith Hartley – engineering [11–12]
- Steve Rooke – mastering at Abbey Road

Notes

- Track 1 recorded at Suite 16, Rochdale, England, December 1989
- Tracks 2–3 recorded 1989
- Track 4 recorded at Pet Sounds, Glasgow, Scotland, July 1989
- Tracks 5–10 recorded at Fun City, New York City, US, July 1990
- Tracks 11–12 recorded at Amazon, Liverpool, England, Spring 1991
