= Super De Luxe =

Studio album by Attic Lights
- Released: May 2013
- Genre: Indie
- Length: 34:34
- Label: Elefant Records
- Producer: Francis MacDonald, John McLaughlin, Jim Lang

Attic Lights chronology
Friday Night Lights (2008)	Super De Luxe (2013)

Professional ratings
Review scores
Source	Rating
All music	4.5/5 stars

Super De Luxe is the second studio album by the Scottish indie rock band Attic Lights, released in May 2013 on Elefant Records. Metro described the album as channeling Britpop.

Francis MacDonald, of Teenage Fanclub and BMX Bandits fame, assisted with production along with producer and engineer Jim Lang.

== Track listing ==
All songs written by Attic Lights

1. "Say You Love Me" – 4:14
2. "Future Bound" – 4:05
3. "Breathe For Me" – 4:23
4. "Stay Before You Leave" – 3:41
5. "Mona Lisa" – 4:16
6. "Don't You" – 2:37
7. "Hit And Miss" – 2:55
8. "Lock Me Out" – 3:32
9. "Orbison" – 3:30
10. "Gabrielle" – 4:48

== Personnel ==
- Kev Sherry - vocals, guitar, keyboards
- Colin McArdle - vocals, bass, guitar
- Jamie Houston - vocals, guitar, piano
- Tim Davidson - guitar, pedal steel guitar
- Noel O'Donnell - vocals, drums, glockenspiel
- Jim Lang - additional guitars and keyboards
- Francis MacDonald - producer, additional percussion
- John McLaughlin - producer
- Jim Lang - producer and engineer,
- Dave Thomas Jnr - additional programming and mixing
