= Friday Night Lights (Attic Lights album) =

Studio album by Attic Lights
- Released: 13 October 2008
- Genre: Indie rock
- Length: 34:34
- Label: Island
- Producer: Francis MacDonald, John McLaughlin, Stuart McCredie

Attic Lights chronology
Friday Night Lights (2008)	Super De Luxe (2013)

Professional ratings
Aggregate scores
Source	Rating
Metacritic	72/100
Review scores
Source	Rating
Mojo	4/5 stars
musicOMH	2/5 stars
Q	3/5 stars
Uncut	4/5 stars

Friday Night Lights is the debut studio album by the Scottish indie rock band Attic Lights, released on 13 October 2008 on Island Records.

Francis MacDonald, of Teenage Fanclub and BMX Bandits fame, assisted with production.

== Track listing ==
All songs written by Attic Lights

1. "Never Get Sick Of The Sea" – 3:24
2. "Bring You Down" – 3:40
3. "Wendy" – 3:27
4. "Send Those Dark Eyes This Way" – 2:43
5. "Nothing But Love" – 3:47
6. "God" – 3:09
7. "The Dirty Thirst" – 3:33
8. "Walkie Talkie" – 2:32
9. "Late Night Sunshine" – 3:59
10. "Winter On" – 4:20

=== Bonus Tracks ===
- "I Could Be So Good for You" (Minder Theme Cover) - 2:42 (iTunes Bonus Track)

The album cover features an illustration of a MK 5 Ford Cortina.

== Personnel ==
- Kev Sherry - vocals, guitar
- Colin McArdle - vocals, bass
- Jamie Houston - vocals, guitar, piano ("Send Those Dark Eyes This Way", "Nothing But Love"), keyboards ("Winter On")
- Tim Davidson - guitar, pedal steel guitar ("Wendy", "The Dirty Thirst"), baritone guitar ("Send Those Dark Eyes This Way", "Winter On"), vocals ("Winter On")
- Noel O'Donnell - vocals, drums, glockenspiel ("Bring You Down")
- Francis MacDonald - producer, additional percussion ("The Dirty Thirst")
- John McLaughlin - producer
- Stuart McCreadie - producer, mixing (tracks: 3, 4, 8)
- Chris Northcote - Engineer / Assistant Engineer
- Gordy Goudie - additional piano ("Never Get Sick of the Sea")
- Cenzo Townsend - mixing (tracks: 1, 2, 5, 7, 9, 10)
- Rich Costey - mixing ("God")
- Cairn String Quartet - strings (tracks: 2, 3, 9)
