= Howdy! =

Howdy! may refer to:

- Howdy! (Teenage Fanclub album)
- Howdy! (Pat Boone album)

== See also ==
- Howdy (disambiguation)
