= Howdy (disambiguation) =

Howdy is an informal greeting commonly associated with Southern American English.

Howdy may also refer to:

== People ==
- Howdy Caton (1894-1948), American Major League Baseball player
- Howdy Forrester (1922-1987), American bluegrass fiddler
- Howdy Gray (1901-1955), American college football player
- Howdy Groskloss (1901-1953), American Major League Baseball player
- Howdy Holmes (born 1947), American racecar driver
- Howdy Myers (1910-1980), American college multi-sports coach and administrator
- Howard "Howdy" Quicksell (1901-1953), American composer and banjoist
- Howdy Wilcox (1889-1923), American racecar driver
- Howdy Wilcox II (1905-1946), American racecar driver (no relation to the above - the "II" was simply to distinguish the two)

== Music/others ==
- Howdy! (Pat Boone album) (1956)
- Howdy! (Teenage Fanclub album), released by British alternative rock band Teenage Fanclub in 2000
- Howdy!, a Minnie Pearl album
- "Howdy", a 1965 single by Buddy Ebsen
- the title character of Howdy Doody, a popular American children's television program from 1947 to 1960
- Howdy, a character in the Japanese anime series Hamtaro - see List of Hamtaro characters
- "Howdy" Lewis, in The Rounders (1965 film) and The Rounders (TV series), played by Henry Fonda and Patrick Wayne respectively

== Other uses ==
- WWKY (Howdy 97.7), a radio station licensed to Sebree, Kentucky
- WPTQ, a radio station licensed to Glasgow, Kentucky, branded HOWDY 103.7 when it played country music
- Howdy, a subscription video streaming service owned and operated by Roku, Inc.
- Howdy.com, an American technology staffing company headquartered in Austin, Texas.
