= Man-Made =

Album by Teenage Fanclub

Studio album by Teenage Fanclub
- Released: 9 May 2005
- Recorded: February–June 2004
- Studio: Soma Electronic Music Studios (Chicago); Raymond's house (Glasgow); Riverside Studios (Busby)
- Genre: Alternative rock
- Length: 42:55
- Label: PeMa (Europe); Merge (North America)
- Producer: John McEntire

Teenage Fanclub chronology
Four Thousand Seven Hundred and Sixty-Six Seconds – A Shortcut to Teenage Fanclub (2003)	Man-Made (2005)	Shadows (2010)

Singles from Man-Made
- 1. "Fallen Leaves" Released: 30 May 2005; 2. "It's All in My Mind" Released: 21 November 2005

Professional ratings
Review scores
Source	Rating
AllMusic	4/5 stars
The Guardian	4/5 stars
LAS Magazine	8/10
Neumu	7/10
Pitchfork	7.4/10
PopMatters	8/10
Rolling Stone	3/5 stars

Man-Made is the eighth studio album by Scottish alternative rock band Teenage Fanclub, released on 9 May 2005. It was released on the band's own PeMa label in Europe and on Merge Records in North America.

== Recording ==
Guitarist Norman Blake said, "We'd liked what John McEntire had done on the Stereolab records, so we got in touch with him. He was up for it, and suggested we come to Chicago. We hardly took any equipment, just some guitars and a pair of drumsticks. We even borrowed a guitar from Jeff Tweedy. I'm glad we did, otherwise we'd have been fucked. We'd have had to buy one!" The album was mostly recorded and mixed at McEntire's Soma Electronic Music Studios, with additional recording and editing at guitarist Raymond McGinley's home studio in Glasgow, and at Riverside Studios in Busby near Glasgow.

== Track listing ==
No.	Title	Writer(s)	Length
1.	"It's All in My Mind"	Norman Blake	3:41
2.	"Time Stops"	Gerard Love	4:11
3.	"Nowhere"	Raymond McGinley	3:40
4.	"Save"	Love	4:14
5.	"Slow Fade"	Blake	1:54
6.	"Only with You"	McGinley	4:21
7.	"Cells"	Blake	3:20
8.	"Feel"	McGinley	3:51
9.	"Fallen Leaves"	Love	3:31
10.	"Flowing"	Blake	3:01
11.	"Born Under a Good Sign"	Love	3:00
12.	"Don't Hide"	McGinley	4:00

== Personnel ==
Teenage Fanclub

- Norman Blake – vocals, guitar
- Gerard Love – vocals, bass
- Raymond McGinley – vocals, guitar
- Francis Macdonald – drums

Additional musicians

- John McCusker – violin, viola
- John McEntire – piano on "Only with You"

Technical

- John McEntire – engineer, mixing
- Tim Iseler – engineer (Soma)
- Nick Brine – engineer (Raymond's house, Riverside Studios)
- Annabel Wright – artwork
- Peter Love – layout
