= Attic Lights =

Scottish indie rock band

- Origin: Glasgow, Scotland
- Genres: Indie rock Power pop
- Years active: 2005–present
- Labels: Island Records; Elefant Records
- Members: Kev Sherry; Colin McArdle; Jamie Houston; Noel O'Donnell
- Past members: Jim Lang; Tim Davidson

Attic Lights are a Scottish indie rock band from Glasgow, Scotland, formed in 2005 by Kev Sherry (vocals, guitar), Colin McArdle (vocals, bass) and Jamie Houston (guitar, keyboard, vocals), later joined by Tim Davidson (guitar, pedal steel) and Noel O'Donnell (drums, glockenspiel, vocals). The four-part harmonies in a number of their songs have led to critical comparisons with Teenage Fanclub and The Beach Boys. Their guitar heavy powerpop has been compared to alternative rock bands such as Weezer, R.E.M. and The Lemonheads.

A series of independent releases and live performances, including a well-received appearance at the 2007 T in the Park festival, led to a bidding war between major labels. The band signed with Island Records, and released their debut album, Friday Night Lights, in October 2008.

== History ==
Attic Lights began by rehearsing and recording demos in (vocalist / bassist) Colin McArdle's attic in Springburn, Glasgow. In 2006 the band composed and performed the theme tune for BBC Scotland series The Music Show. They played the Glasgow circuit and toured small venues throughout the UK before being signed to Island Records in 2007.

In July 2008, Attic Lights appeared on the BBC's The Culture Show in a live performance and interview and had their Somerset House gig filmed and broadcast live on Channelbee. In October 2008 the band began to tour with Paul Heaton and Cerys Matthews. On 21 October 2008, Attic Lights invited fans via their MySpace page to be in their music video for their single "Late Night Sunshine". On 13 October 2008, the band's debut album, Friday Night Lights, was released to positive reviews. The CD single version of "Bring You Down" featured remixes by fellow Glaswegians Mogwai and Camera Obscura.

Attic Lights saw in 2009 by playing at the Edinburgh Princes Street Hogmanay celebrations. They followed this with a UK and Ireland tour supporting Camera Obscura. With the relaunch of the new series of Minder on Five, the band re-recorded the program's signature theme tune. This was previously sung by Dennis Waterman (who starred in it as Terry McCann, the original 'minder').

The group recorded a cover of fellow Glaswegians Strawberry Switchblade's "Since Yesterday" for a TV campaign advertising the STV Jobs website, which launched in January 2010 and ran throughout the year.

In 2012, the band signed with Elefant Records. On 1 April 2013, Attic Lights released new single, "Say You Love Me" on Elefant Records. This was followed in May by the release of the band's second album, Super De Luxe.

In July 2013, Attic Lights opened the main stage at the Benicassim Music Festival and followed this up in September headlining the Lemon Pop festival in Alicante, Spain.

In March 2014, the band released the single "Orbison", a tribute to Roy Orbison with an accompanying music video featuring reworked scenes from David Lynch's Blue Velvet. The video also featured pop culture homages to the film The Man Who Fell to Earth, the writings of Michael Kelly and the music video for the Roy Orbison song, "I Drove All Night".

In August 2014, Attic Lights performed on the main stage of the Party at the Palace festival in Linlithgow, Scotland alongside a bill of Scottish acts including Deacon Blue, Frightened Rabbit, Simple Minds and The View.

In 2015, Attic Lights released a single in conjunction with Spanish indie pop act La Casa Azul. The single contained a remix of the Super De Luxe album track "Future Bound" and a brand new song entitled "War Years" about the gay rights struggle.

In November 2016, the band's song "Why Should Christmas Be So Hard?' was used to close the Christmas episode of the HBO comedy/drama show Divorce featuring Sarah Jessica Parker.

In October 2018, Attic Lights released their new single "Never By Myself". The b-side of the single is a cover of Art Garfunkel's "Bright Eyes".

Attic Lights third album, Love in the Time of Shark Attacks, was released on 25 January 2019 on Elefant Records.

In 2020, their song "Breathe For Me" featured in an episode of the hit Netflix show Elite.

== Further information ==
Drummer Noel O'Donnell also plays drums for Tracyanne & Danny (Merge Records) and Lightships (Geographic). In 2021, singer Kev Sherry's feminist comic Painted was published in France, the USA and UK by Humanoids Inc. Sherry has also written cultural commentary journalism for New Statesman, The Alternative UK and stv.com. Sherry is the younger cousin of Talking Heads singer David Byrne. Colin McArdle previously performed under the name of 'Zurich' and released a number of 7 inch singles on Boa Records in 1999 and 2000.

== Discography ==
=== Studio albums ===
- Friday Night Lights (2008)
- Super De Luxe (2013)
- Love in the Time of Shark Attacks (2019)

=== Singles ===
- "Attic Lights" - (EP UK 2005)
- "Shiver the Trees" - (EP UK 2006)
- "Martin" - (7" UK 2006)
- "God" - (7" UK 2007)
- "Never Get Sick of the Sea" - (2008)
- "God" - (2008) (re-release)
- "Bring You Down" - (2008)
- "Wendy" - (2008)
- "Santa's Girlfriend" - (2008)
- "Late Night Sunshine" / Minder Theme Tune - "I Could Be So Good For You" - (2009)
- "Say You Love Me" - (2013)
- "Don't You" - (2013)
- "Orbison" - (2014)
- "Future Bound/War Years" - (2015) (La Casa Azul remix)
- "Why Should Christmas Be So Hard?" - (2016) (re-release)
- "Never By Myself" / "Bright Eyes" - (2018)
- "Louis" - (2019)
- "Kings Of Whatever" - (2019)
