= Nothing Lasts Forever (Teenage Fanclub album) =

Studio album by Teenage Fanclub
- Released: 22 September 2023
- Recorded: 2022
- Studios: Rockfield Studios, Monmouth; Raymond's place, Glasgow; Strings recorded in London
- Length: 39:23
- Labels: PeMa (Europe); Merge (North America)
- Producer: Teenage Fanclub

Teenage Fanclub chronology
Endless Arcade (2021)	Nothing Lasts Forever (2023)	Do Not Dare to Dream (2026)

Singles from Nothing Lasts Forever
- 1. "I Left a Light On" Released: 4 April 2022; 2. "Foreign Land" Released: 23 May 2023; 3. "Tired of Being Alone" Released: 7 July 2023; 4. "Back to the Light" Released: 8 August 2023

Nothing Lasts Forever is the twelfth studio album by Scottish band Teenage Fanclub, released on 22 September 2023 through PeMa in Europe and Merge Records in North America. It received positive reviews from critics.

== Critical reception ==
Professional ratings
Aggregate scores
Source	Rating
Metacritic	81/100
Review scores
Source	Rating
AllMusic	4/5 stars
The Arts Desk	4/5 stars
Exclaim!	7/10
Mojo	4/5 stars
MusicOMH	4.5/5 stars
Pitchfork	6.9/10
Record Collector	4/5 stars
Uncut	8/10

Nothing Lasts Forever received a score of 81 out of 100 on review aggregator Metacritic based on 14 critics' reviews, indicating "universal acclaim". Classic Rock wrote that it "might even be the closest approximation yet of what the 60s actually sounded like", and Uncut called it "even more impressive" than Endless Arcade as "the five-piece creat[e] an organic song cycle largely concerned with the roll of time hope's eternal promise and an unerring sense of where their natural strengths lie". David Pollock of Record Collector found that "big emotions continue to be captured, seemingly without effort, on their canvas" as the "country-rock songwriting tones of 'Tired of Being Alone' and 'Falling Into the Sun' are rich and expansive".

Exclaim!'s Adam Fink stated that the band "still sound bright, chiming and as thoughtful as ever. While the material on the album skews slightly more introverted and darker than what they've done previously, the band's harmonies still soar sky high". Steven Johnson of MusicOMH found that it "follows a similar format to Endless Arcade in that it has an equal number of songs from two remaining songwriters Norman Blake and Raymond McGinley. In short, it's another exercise in refinement, consolidation and upholding songwriting standards while looking forward with hope and positivity". Writing for Pitchfork, Stephen Thomas Erlewine felt that "the warmth emanating from the lyrics flows throughout Nothing Lasts Forever. Teenage Fanclub never quickens the pace or belabors the melodies, choosing to luxuriate in their twilight grooves".

=== Year-end lists ===
Nothing Lasts Forever on year-end lists
Publication	List	Rank	Ref.
Mojo	The 75 Best Albums of 2023	23	
Uncut	The 50 Best Albums of 2023	35	

== Track listing ==
Nothing Lasts Forever track listing
No.	Title	Writer(s)	Length
1.	"Foreign Land"	Norman Blake	3:54
2.	"Tired of Being Alone"	Raymond McGinley	4:43
3.	"I Left a Light On"	Blake	3:34
4.	"See the Light"	McGinley	3:22
5.	"It's Alright"	Blake	3:48
6.	"Falling into the Sun"	McGinley	3:13
7.	"Self-Sedation"	Blake	3:20
8.	"Middle of My Mind"	McGinley	3:17
9.	"Back to the Light"	Blake	3:06
10.	"I Will Love You"	McGinley	7:06
Total length:			39:23

== Personnel ==
Teenage Fanclub

- Norman Blake – production
- Euros Childs – production
- Francis MacDonald – production
- Raymond McGinley – production, engineering
- Dave McGowan – production

Additional musicians

- Stephen Black – clarinet, saxophone
- John McCusker – strings on "I Left a Light On"
- Daisy Spiers – strings on "I Left a Light On"

Technical

- Guy Davie – mastering
- David Henderson – engineering
- Joe Jones – engineering
- Tom Walsh – string engineering
- H. Hawkline – design

== Charts ==
Chart performance for Nothing Lasts Forever
Chart (2023)	Peak position
German Albums (Offizielle Top 100)	94
Scottish Albums (Official Charts)	2
UK Albums (Official Charts)	30
UK Independent Albums (Official Charts)	2
