= Shadows (Teenage Fanclub album) =

Studio album by Teenage Fanclub
- Released: 31 May 2010
- Recorded: August 2008–January 2009
- Studios: Leeders Farm (Norfolk, England); Raymond's place (Glasgow, Scotland); Rockfield Studios (Monmouth, Wales)
- Genre: Alternative rock
- Length: 47:54
- Labels: PeMa (Europe); Merge (North America)

Teenage Fanclub chronology
Man-Made (2005)	Shadows (2010)	Here (2016)

Singles from Shadows
- 1. "Baby Lee" Released: 24 May 2010

Shadows is the ninth studio album by Scottish alternative rock band Teenage Fanclub, released on 31 May 2010 on the band's own PeMa label in Europe and on Merge Records in North America. It is the band's first new album release in five years. The album contains twelve songs: four written by Gerard Love, four by Norman Blake, and four by Raymond McGinley. Blake's "Baby Lee" was released as a single.

The liner notes credit David McGowan as a member, and he has been a constant tour fixture since 2004, playing keyboards, additional guitars and the slide guitar.

== Recording ==
The five-year gap between Shadows and the band's previous album Man-Made was not completely intentional, according to guitarist Raymond McGinley: "We decided to take some time before we recorded anything to just do other stuff for a time, individually, and that ended up being a lot longer than we initially planned." He added, "We didn't take very long to record the actual album, it was all pretty much done back in 2008, but we did take our time mixing it and then had another break after it just to let it mature for a while before we dealt with all the stuff that goes along with releasing an album."

== Critical reception ==
Professional ratings
Aggregate scores
Source	Rating
Metacritic	81/100
Review scores
Source	Rating
AllMusic	4/5 stars
The A.V. Club	A−
Billboard	4.5/5 stars
Drowned in Sound	8/10
Mojo	4/5 stars
Paste	7/10
Pitchfork	7.4/10
Q	4/5 stars
Spin	3.5/5 stars
Uncut	4/5 stars

Shadows received favorable reviews from music critics. At Metacritic, which assigns a normalized rating out of 100 to reviews from critics, the album received an average score of 81, which indicates "universal acclaim", based on 18 reviews. Matt Collar of AllMusic found the "sparkling and reflective" album a worthy follow-up to Man-Made, and concluded by writing "If the day [described in "Today Never Ends"] is as sun-drenched and relaxed as the songs on Shadows implies, then may it and Teenage Fanclub go on and on." Noel Murray of The A.V. Club wrote "This is a work of rare craft, from a band now inclined to leave behind something timelessly beautiful."

Spin named Shadows the 40th best album of 2010.

== Track listing ==
No.	Title	Writer(s)	Length
1.	"Sometimes I Don't Need to Believe in Anything"	Gerard Love	4:34
2.	"Baby Lee"	Norman Blake, Jo Mango, Ziggy Campbell (lyrics) / Blake (music)	4:26
3.	"The Fall"	Raymond McGinley	5:28
4.	"Into the City"	Love	4:30
5.	"Dark Clouds"	Blake	2:43
6.	"The Past"	McGinley	3:33
7.	"Shock and Awe"	Love	3:43
8.	"When I Still Have Thee"	Blake	3:30
9.	"Live with the Seasons"	McGinley	3:26
10.	"Sweet Days Waiting"	Love	3:38
11.	"The Back of My Mind"	Blake	4:02
12.	"Today Never Ends"	McGinley	4:30

Japanese CD edition and Shadows (download version) bonus tracks
No.	Title	Writer(s)	Length
13.	"Secret Heart" (B-side to "Baby Lee")	Love	4:15
14.	"Dark and Lonely"	Blake	4:38

== Personnel ==
Credits for Shadows are adapted from AllMusic and the album liner notes.

Teenage Fanclub

- Norman Blake – guitar, vocals
- Gerard Love – bass, vocals
- Francis Macdonald – drums
- Raymond McGinley – guitar, vocals
- David McGowan – keyboards, guitar

Additional musicians

- Euros Childs – backing vocals (2, 8), piano (5)
- Tom Crossley – flute (1)
- John McCusker – strings

Technical

- Nick Brine – engineer, mixing
- Andy Bell – assistant engineer
- Dave Pye – assistant engineer
- Steve Rooke – mastering
- Toby Paterson – artwork
- Robert Dallas Gray – layout
