= Endless Arcade =

Studio album by Teenage Fanclub
- Released: 30 April 2021
- Recorded: January 2019–March 2020
- Studio: Clouds Hill Recordings, Hamburg, Germany; Raymond's place, Glasgow, Scotland; Rockfield Studios, Monmouth, Wales
- Genre: Alternative rock; jangle pop
- Length: 44:24
- Label: PeMa (Europe); Merge (North America)
- Producer: Teenage Fanclub

Teenage Fanclub chronology
Here (2016)	Endless Arcade (2021)	Nothing Lasts Forever (2023)

Singles from Endless Arcade
- 1. "Everything Is Falling Apart" Released: February 20, 2019; 2. "Home" Released: November 11, 2020; 3. "I'm More Inclined" Released: January 25, 2021; 4. "The Sun Won't Shine On Me" Released: March 15, 2021; 5. "In Our Dreams" Released: April 13, 2021

Endless Arcade is the eleventh studio album by Scottish band Teenage Fanclub. Released on 30 April 2021, it is the band's first record since the departure of co-founder Gerard Love in late 2018 and their first with former Gorky's Zygotic Mynci member Euros Childs. The album's title comes from co-founder Raymond McGinley's song of the same name, with McGinley envisioning an endless arcade as "a city that you can wander through, with a sense of mystery, an imaginary one that goes on forever. When it came to choosing an album title, it seemed to have something for this collection of songs."

== Background ==
After parting ways with Gerard Love following a series of late 2018 shows in which Teenage Fanclub performed the five recently reissued albums they had recorded for Creation Records during the Nineties in full, the band regrouped in January 2019 with long-time member Dave McGowan switching over from playing keyboards and guitar to fill the bassist position vacated by Love. Euros Childs – who also collaborates with Teenage Fanclub co-founder Norman Blake in the side project Jonny – joined the band on keyboards.

When they started gathering material for a new album, Blake already had a song called "I'm More Inclined" ready to be presented to the rest of the band. Following approval of the song, they soon set about recording their new album.

== Recording ==
In January 2019 the new-look Teenage Fanclub relocated to Hamburg, Germany, a city that they had grown to love, for recording sessions at Clouds Hill Recordings, a facility in which they had mixed their previous album, Here. Following these sessions, they embarked on a tour of Asia, Australia, North America and Europe from February to April. They would then return to Clouds Hill in late November 2019 for more recording. Additional recording was also done at Raymond McGinley's home studio in Glasgow and at Rockfield Studios in Wales.

As the remaining ever-present members of Teenage Fanclub, Norman Blake and Raymond McGinley maintained a pragmatic outlook towards the differences in recording with the new line-up, with McGinley commenting, "With Gerry not being there…it’s different. But then Dave is on bass and Euros is there. It’s an inspiring thing!" Meanwhile, according to Blake, "I think some of the playing is a bit freer and looser than on recent albums. Dave and Euros’ playing is amazing, and Francis [Macdonald] on drums is really swinging."

After plans to release the album in October 2020 and go on tour for the remainder of the year fell through, Blake and McGinley used the extra time caused by the enforced postponement for further work on mixing the album in Glasgow.

== Release ==
On 20 February 2019, Teenage Fanclub released the first taste of their recent recording session in the form of "Everything Is Falling Apart", which was written and sung by Raymond McGinley.

In March 2020 the band announced that their new album, Endless Arcade, was to be released in October to coincide with a UK and Europe tour the following November and December. However, in June they subsequently rescheduled the tour for April and May 2021 due to the COVID-19 pandemic, with the album's release also pushed back ahead of the new tour dates.

On 11 November 2020, Teenage Fanclub announced Endless Arcade's release date of 5 March 2021, along with the album's track listing. They also released a single edit and video for "Home", the album's opening track which was penned and sung by Norman Blake.

On 25 January 2021, Teenage Fanclub released Blake's song “I'm More Inclined” as a single. They also announced that Endless Arcade’s release date had been pushed back to 30 April 2021 due to “circumstances beyond our control.” The band's tour dates in support of the album were also postponed to September 2021 and April and May 2022.

"The Sun Won't Shine on Me", another Blake-written song from the album, was released on 15 March 2021, followed by the album's final single, McGinley's "In Our Dreams", on 13 April 2021.

== Reception ==
Endless Arcade currently holds a 7.5/10 score on AnyDecentMusic?, which has conglomerated 20 reviews from various publications, and according to Metacritic, another review aggregation site, a score of 79/100 – based on 18 reviewers – indicates a "generally favorable" consensus.

Professional ratings
Review scores
Source	Rating
AllMusic	4/5 stars
The Arts Desk	4/5 stars
Mojo	4/5 stars
MusicOMH	4.5/5 stars
The Observer	4/5 stars
Pitchfork	7/10
PopMatters	7/10
Record Collector	4/5 stars
Slant Magazine	3.5/5 stars
Uncut	4/5 stars

== Track listing ==
No.	Title	Writer(s)	Length
1.	"Home"	Norman Blake	7:04
2.	"Endless Arcade"	Raymond McGinley	3:25
3.	"Warm Embrace"	Blake	2:07
4.	"Everything Is Falling Apart"	McGinley	4:28
5.	"The Sun Won't Shine on Me"	Blake	2:40
6.	"Come with Me"	McGinley	3:27
7.	"In Our Dreams"	McGinley	4:15
8.	"I'm More Inclined"	Blake	3:20
9.	"Back in the Day"	Blake	3:49
10.	"The Future"	McGinley	3:06
11.	"Living with You"	Blake	2:55
12.	"Silent Song"	McGinley	3:48
Total length:			44:24

== Personnel ==
Adapted from the album liner notes.

Teenage Fanclub

- Norman Blake
- Raymond McGinley
- Francis Macdonald
- David McGowan
- Euros Childs

Technical

- Teenage Fanclub – producer
- David Henderson – engineer
- Linda Gerdes – assistant engineer (Clouds Hill)
- Sebastian Muxfeldt – assistant engineer (Clouds Hill)
- Stephen Black – engineer (credited with recording "some of Euros' backing vocals in Cardiff")
- Salvador Daily – mastering
- H. Hawkline – design

== Charts ==
Chart performance for Endless Arcade
Chart (2021)	Peak position
German Albums (Offizielle Top 100)	57
Irish Albums (IRMA)	51
Scottish Albums (OCC)	2
Swiss Albums (Schweizer Hitparade)	95
UK Albums (OCC)	11
UK Independent Albums (OCC)	3
Spanish Albums (PROMUSICAE)	90
