= God Knows It's True =

EP by Teenage Fanclub
- Released: November 1990
- Recorded: 13 July 1990
- Studio: Fun City, New York City
- Genre: Indie rock; alternative rock
- Label: Paperhouse; Matador
- Producer: Don Fleming; Teenage Fanclub

Teenage Fanclub chronology
A Catholic Education (1990)	God Knows It's True (1990)	The King (1991)

Singles from God Knows It's True
- 1. "God Knows It's True" b/w "So Far Gone" Released: November 1990

God Knows It's True is an EP by Scottish rock band Teenage Fanclub, released in 1990 in the UK by Paperhouse Records and in 1991 in the US by Matador Records. It was co-produced by Don Fleming, who had been introduced to the band earlier in 1990 by word of mouth, and who would also work on the band's next two albums, The King and Bandwagonesque.

== Reception ==
Professional ratings
Review scores
Source	Rating
AllMusic	3/5 stars
Robert Christgau	B+

In NME, Steve Lamacq said for people who had heard the band's previous recordings and "been let down by the naff production, this is the closest they've come to recreating their beautiful loudness on vinyl. For anyone else, this is a gate-crashing introduction to the wee, unassuming Scotsmen."

== Track listing ==
No.	Title	Writer(s)	Length
1.	"God Knows It's True"	Norman Blake	4:58
2.	"Weedbreak"	Blake, Raymond McGinley, Gerard Love, Brendan O'Hare	2:39
3.	"So Far Gone"	Love	3:20
4.	"Ghetto Blaster"	Blake, McGinley, Love, O'Hare	1:53

== Personnel ==
Teenage Fanclub

- Norman Blake
- Gerard Love
- Raymond McGinley
- Brendan O'Hare

Additional musicians

- Don Fleming – extra backing vocals on "God Knows It's True"

Technical

- Don Fleming – producer, mixing
- Teenage Fanclub – producer
- Wharton Tiers – engineer
- David E. Zhivago – sleeve

== Charts ==
Chart (1990)	Peak position
UK Singles (OCC)	99
