= What You Do to Me =

'What You Do To Me' may refer to:

- "What You Do To Me", 1983 song by Carl Wilson, from their 1983 album, "Youngblood"
- "What You Do to Me", 1991 song by Teenage Fanclub from their album Bandwagonesque
- "What You Do to Me", 2016 song by John Legend from their album Darkness and Light
- the 1980 track What Cha Doin by Seawind (band)
- Hot Diggity (Dog Ziggity Boom), recorded by Perry Como in 1956, because it repeatedly features the words "what you do to me"
- Hey There Delilah a 2007 song by Plain White T's which uses the line repeated as its chorus
