= Howdy! (Teenage Fanclub album) =

Studio album by Teenage Fanclub
- Released: 23 October 2000
- Recorded: August 1999 – March 2000
- Studios: Rockfield, Wales; Astoria, London
- Genres: Power pop, Americana
- Length: 48:09
- Label: Columbia
- Producer: Teenage Fanclub

Teenage Fanclub chronology
Songs from Northern Britain (1997)	Howdy! (2000)	Words of Wisdom and Hope (2002)

Singles from Howdy!
- 1. "I Need Direction" Released: 16 October 2000; 2. "Dumb Dumb Dumb" Released: 16 April 2001

Howdy! is the seventh studio album by Scottish rock band Teenage Fanclub, released on 23 October 2000 through Columbia Records. With the addition of keyboardist Finlay MacDonald, the band wrote new material, eventually debuting some of it live in early 1999. Following this, they recorded their next album at Rockfield Studios in Wales, as well as Astoria in London, between August 1999 and March 2000. Shortly afterwards, drummer Paul Quinn left the band and was replaced by Francis MacDonald. Howdy! is an Americana and power pop album, recalling the work of the Hollies.

Howdy! received generally favourable from critics, with many praising the songwriting. The album reached number eight in Scotland and number 33 in the United Kingdom, where "I Need Direction" peaked at number 48. After signing to Columbia Records, Teenage Fanclub played a variety of festivals in Spain, Japan and the United Kingdom, leading up to the release of the album's lead single, "I Need Direction", in October 2000. That same month, the band toured the UK with support from Suckle. "Dumb Dumb Dumb" was released as the album's second single, coinciding with a tour of mainland Europe and a stint in the United States. Howdy! saw release in that territory in early 2002.

== Background and recording ==
Teenage Fanclub released their sixth studio album Songs from Northern Britain through Creation Records in 1997, peaking at number three in the UK Albums Chart. All three of its singles – "Ain't That Enough", "I Don't Want Control of You" and "Start Again" – appeared on the UK Singles Chart, with "Ain't That Enough" peaking the highest at number 17. By the end of the year, former BMX Bandits keyboardist Finlay MacDonald formally joined Teenage Fanclub, having spent the previous six months on tour with them. Bassist Gerard Love said the band were in the planning stage for their next album; he said they wanted to record it across various studios in separate batches, in lieu of recording all of the songs in one location.

In February 1999, the band revealed they were in the process of writing new material. They debuted several new songs at the Bowlie Weekender festival the following month, and supported R.E.M. for two shows in the UK. Howdy! was recorded at Rockfield Studios in Wales between August 1999 and March 2000, with extra overdubs being done at the Astoria, a London-based studio in a boat owned by David Gilmour of Pink Floyd in February 2000. The band produced the sessions, while Nick Brine served as their engineer; they were assisted by engineers Lee Butler and Damon Iddens. They would record a few songs at a time, return home to Glashow to rehearse, and repeat the process. The recordings were mixed at Rockfield, before being edited by Steve Falone and mastered by Greg Calbi at Sterling Sound in New York City.

== Composition ==
Howdy! is an Americana and power pop album that was compared to the work of the Hollies. Neumu writer Ryan DeGama said it showcased the "well-polished guitar jangle and three-part harmonies" which were hallmarks of the band's sound". Ben Sisario of Rolling Stone wrote that the album's most prevalent theme was "an earnest quest to find love and a place to call one's own". Alongside the band, extra musicians contributed to the recordings: Megan Childs with violin on "Accidental Life"; Mick Cooke with trumpet on "Near You" and "The Town and the City", tuba on "Near You" and piccolo trumpet on "The Town and the City"; Sharon Fitzgerald with French horn on "Near You"; and Brine with backing vocals on "Dumb Dumb Dumb".

Howdy opens with "I Need Direction", which recalls the work of the Jasmine Minks. In the country-enhanced "Accidental Life", Blake consoles a woman who believes her Guardian angels had left her. Both it and "Near You" are soft-psych tracks, the latter being reminiscent of the work of Matthew Sweet. "Happiness" is centred around Hammond organ and a harmonica; "The Town and the City" incorporates bells, horns and keyboards. Steve Lichtenstein of PopMatters said "Dumb Dumb Dumb", which featured Turtles-esque backing vocals, offered a "rougher, more jagged exterior to the otherwise blinding sheen" when compared to the rest of the tracks, bringing to mind the work of John Mayer and Pete Yorn. With "The Sun Shines from You", which had a guitar riff reminiscent of the one heard in "Flame" (1999) by Sebadoh, McGinley compares the enjoyment of the weather to a relationship. "Straight & Narrow", which recalls "What Am I Doing Hangin' 'Round?" (1967) by the Monkees, tackles the topic of addiction. "Cul De Sac" evokes the songs on Bambu, an unfinished album by Dennis Wilson of the Beach Boys, as well as that band's own Pet Sounds (1966) album. In contrast to the other songs on the album, "My Uptight Life" sees McGinley during the verse sections and Blake during the chorus portions, returning to McGinley for its coda. The album concludes with the acoustic folk of "If I Never See You Again".

== Release ==
On 28 March 2000, drummer Paul Quinn left the band, with their manager Chris Banks saying the decision was to focus on his family. Alongside this, Banks was unsure of where the band would go following the shutdown of Creation Records, explaining that their future was down to Sony Music, who owned Creation. Blake said Creation founder Alan McGee said he would try to get the band to sign with Sony; the company were forced to release the album or pay them for the studio album, ultimately going with the former option. On 10 May 2000, Banks announced that Francis MacDonald, formerly of BMX Bandits, would serve as Quinn's replacement. That same month, Blake took a break from the band to go on tour with Gorky's Zygotic Mynci as their guitarist. On 11 July 2000, the band announced they had signed to Sony imprint Columbia Records and that their forthcoming album would see release later in the year. Guitarist Raymond McGinley said they had received interest from other labels, but Columbia head Blair McDonald was "more interested in talking about the detail of the thing than going, ‘We'll sell X-amount of records'".

In July and August 2000, the band performed at Santi Rock festival in Spain, Summer Sonic Festival in Japan and headlined one of the stages at the Glasgow Green Festival in the City. On 3 August 2000, Howdy! was announced for release in three months' time and its track listing was posted online. After initially being planned for release in early October 2000, "I Need Direction" was released as the lead single from Howdy! on 16 October 2000. The CD version featured "I Lied" and a cover of "Here Comes Your Man" (1989) by Pixies, while the seven-inch vinyl record edition included "On This Good Night". Howdy! was released on 23 October 2000 through Columbia Records. Following this, the band went on a tour of the UK in October and November 2000, with support from Suckle, ending with two shows at the London Astoria. The band closed out the year with an acoustic charity show later in November 2000 and a performance at Hogmanay in Glasgow on New Year's Eve.

In February and March 2001, Teenage Fanclub played a one-off show in Glasgow and two dates in Greece. "Dumb Dumb Dumb" was released as the second single from the album on 16 April 2001. The CD version featured "Thaw Me" and "One Thousand Lights", while the seven-inch vinyl edition included an alternative version of "Straight & Narrow". It coincided with a tour of mainland Europe, as well as a three-night residency at Camden Underworld in London. In June 2001, the band performed at Fleadh festival in London and the One in Four festival in Glasgow, followed by a tour of the United States in July 2001. Though Howdy! was planned for release in the US in early 2001; Blake said Sony did not view the band as a priority, resulting in zero distribution in the US. By the end of the year, the album was picked up by independent label Thirsty Ear Recordings, who planned to release it in November 2001, until it was delayed till 22 January 2002.

Howdy! was included in Original Album Classics (2012), a box set that also included the band's four previous studio albums. "I Need Direction", "Dumb Dumb Dumb" and "My Uptight Life" were included on the band's second compilation album Four Thousand Seven Hundred and Sixty-Six Seconds – A Short Cut to Teenage Fanclub (2003). In 2018, Howdy! was re-pressed on vinyl; coinciding with this, the band embarked on multi-night residencies where they dedicated a particular night to specific eras of their back catalogue.

== Reception ==
Professional ratings
Aggregate scores
Source	Rating
Metacritic	74/100
Review scores
Source	Rating
AllMusic	3.5/5 stars
Alternative Press	9/10 stars
Melody Maker	4/5 stars
Neumu	7/10 stars
NME	4/5 stars
Pitchfork	6.8/10
Pittsburgh Post-Gazette	3/5 stars
Q	4/5 stars
Rolling Stone	3/5 stars
Select	4/5

Howdy! was met with generally favourable reviews from music critics. At Metacritic, the album received an average score of 74, based on 11 reviews.

AllMusic reviewer Andy Kellman said the majority of the tracks were "light-hearted and cheery", adding that its biggest draws were the "top-drawer craft, lovely three-part harmonies, delicately strummed guitars, and flawless arrangements". In a review for Playlouder, journalist Everett True echoed a similar sentiment, saying that there was "much to love about 'Howdy!' - its windswept harmonies, its jangling guitars and consummate grasp of pop history, for three". NME writer Jim Wirth said the album "demonstrates that Teenage Fanclub have attained such an imperious mastery of their one musical trick – Beach Boys, Big Star, Beatles, Bacharach, Byrds, Badfinger and Band imitated, assimilated and expanded – that you can't even be bothered to get annoyed with them anymore". Emma Morgan of Select said the band's distillation of their influences "makes the difference between mere imitation and true immortalisation". Sisario wrote that the album was "typically sunny Fanclub, yet more nuanced and colorful" than their past work.

JP of Billboard noted that there was "nothing harsh or grungy from the songwriting style" of the band, "[o]n the contrary, it's pure cotton candy for the ears, and it sounds sublime". The Day writer Thor Christensen expanded on this, adding that it showcased a band "blossoming as tunesmiths". Pitchfork's Sam Sodomsky referred to it as "an album of quiet triumphs", highlighting "Dumb Dumb Dumb" and "Cul De Sac". DeGama's minor criticism was directed to the "almost pathological insistence here on consistency of guitar tone", as well as the lack of tempo variation. Nude as the News co-founder Troy Carpenter said it unfavourably retread "territory the group mapped thoroughly" on Songs from Northern Britain and its predecessor Grand Prix (1995). Ed Masley of Pittsburgh Post-Gazette was dismissive of the album, saying that "people aren't as likely to go for their whole Byrds-by-way-of-Big-Star thing in 2002". Ox-Fanzine writer Thomas Kerpen said it was "at best average", making him yawn by the third track.

Howdy! charted at number eight in Scotland and number 33 in the UK; "I Need Direction" peaked at number 48 in the UK.

== Track listing ==
Writing credits per booklet.

No.	Title	Writer(s)	Length
1.	"I Need Direction"	Gerard Love	4:11
2.	"I Can't Find My Way Home"	Raymond McGinley	4:38
3.	"Accidental Life"	Norman Blake	3:10
4.	"Near You"	Love	4:22
5.	"Happiness"	McGinley	3:53
6.	"Dumb Dumb Dumb"	Blake	3:19
7.	"The Town and the City"	Love	4:18
8.	"The Sun Shines from You"	McGinley	3:24
9.	"Straight & Narrow"	Blake	2:11
10.	"Cul De Sac"	Love	5:15
11.	"My Uptight Life"	McGinley	6:55
12.	"If I Never See You Again"	Blake	2:26

== Personnel ==
Personnel per booklet.

Teenage Fanclub

- Norman Blake – vocals, guitar
- Gerard Love – vocals, bass
- Raymond McGinley – vocals, guitar
- Paul Quinn – drums
- Finlay MacDonald – keyboards

Additional musicians

- Megan Childs – violin (track 3)
- Mick Cooke – trumpet (tracks 4 and 7), tuba (track 4), piccolo trumpet (track 7)
- Sharon Fitzgerald – French horn (track 4)
- Nick Brine – backing vocals (track 6)

Technical

- Teenage Fanclub – producer
- Nick Brine – engineer
- Lee Butler – assistant engineer
- Damon Iddens – assistant engineer
- Greg Calbi – mastering
- Steve Falone – editing
- Tom Sheehan – cover photo
- Peter Love – design

== Charts ==
Chart performance for Howdy!
Chart (2000)	Peak position
Scottish Albums (Official Charts)	8
UK Albums (Official Charts)	33
