= Boy howdy =

Boy howdy or Boy Howdy may refer to:

- boy howdy (idiom), an interjection used in the US
- Boy Howdy, an American band (extant 1990 – 1996)
- Boy Howdy, a mascot of the American magazine Creem (extant 1969 – 1989)
