= Mudhoney (disambiguation) =

Mudhoney is a grunge band from Seattle, Washington. "Mudhoney" may also refer to:

- Mudhoney (album), Mudhoney’s 1989 self-titled album
- Mudhoney (film), a film directed by Russ Meyer
- Mudhoney Records, a record label
- "Mudhoney", song by Teenage Fanclub, on their album The King
