= Here (Teenage Fanclub album) =

Studio album by Teenage Fanclub
- Released: 9 September 2016
- Recorded: 2013–2015
- Studios: Vega Studio, Provence, France; Raymond's place, Glasgow, Scotland
- Genre: Alternative rock
- Labels: PeMa (Europe); Merge (North America)
- Producer: Teenage Fanclub

Teenage Fanclub chronology
Shadows (2010)	Here (2016)	Endless Arcade (2021)

Singles from Here
- 1. "I'm in Love" Released: June 2016

Here is the tenth studio album by Scottish alternative rock band Teenage Fanclub, released on 9 September 2016 on the band's own PeMa label in Europe and on Merge Records in North America. It was the band's final album to feature bassist and co-founder Gerard Love, who left the band in November 2018.

== Recording ==
Teenage Fanclub began recording Here in 2013 at Vega Studio in Provence in southeastern France. The studio was primarily chosen for its vintage EMI desk, which is said to have been used for recording two Rolling Stones albums. "We always like to go somewhere that's not Glasgow because I think your environment affects what you're doing while you're working," guitarist Norman Blake said in 2016. "If you go to an exotic location like the south of France, hopefully you feel a little more inspired." The band spent three weeks at the studio, completing most of the backing tracks during their stay. The band then went their separate ways for a few months, ruminating on what they had recorded so far. All vocals were then recorded at guitarist Raymond McGinley's home studio in Glasgow in two weeks spread over a couple of months, with the band's three songwriters taking turns putting down their lead and harmony vocals. "Because we write our lyrics while doing this," Blake said, "it's inevitable that we end up writing about similar things as you can't help but pick up on what the others are writing about."

The band worked on the album for three years intermittently between other projects, with Blake even recording some additional harmony vocals in a hotel room in Halifax, Nova Scotia in Canada when he was performing solo at the Halifax Urban Folk Festival. "I emailed those to Raymond and he dropped them into the song the same day," Blake said. Mixing of the album took three weeks in late 2015 at Clouds Hill Recordings in Hamburg, Germany. It was mastered at Abbey Road Studios in London, England. "Three years, four studios and four countries," as Blake put it.

== Critical reception ==
Professional ratings
Aggregate scores
Source	Rating
AnyDecentMusic?	7.5/10
Metacritic	79/100
Review scores
Source	Rating
AllMusic	4/5 stars
Exclaim!	8/10
The Guardian	4/5 stars
The Independent	3/5 stars
Mojo	4/5 stars
Pitchfork	7.8/10
Q	4/5 stars
Record Collector	4/5 stars
The Skinny	4/5 stars
Uncut	8/10

Here received favorable reviews from music critics. At Metacritic, which assigns a normalized rating out of 100 to reviews from critics, the album received an average score of 79, which indicates "generally favourable reviews", based on 21 reviews.

The album made the twenty-strong longlist for the Scottish album of the Year Award 2017 but did not make it to the ten-strong shortlist.

== Track listing ==
No.	Title	Writer(s)	Length
1.	"I'm in Love"	Norman Blake	2:41
2.	"Thin Air"	Gerard Love	3:11
3.	"Hold On"	Raymond McGinley	3:24
4.	"The Darkest Part of the Night"	Blake	3:16
5.	"I Have Nothing More to Say"	Love	4:18
6.	"I Was Beautiful When I Was Alive"	McGinley	4:44
7.	"The First Sight"	Love	5:08
8.	"Live in the Moment"	Blake	3:03
9.	"Steady State"	McGinley	4:16
10.	"It's a Sign"	Love	3:36
11.	"With You"	McGinley	3:58
12.	"Connected to Life"	Blake	4:00

== Charts ==
Chart (2016)	Peak position
UK Albums (Official Charts)	10
Scottish Albums (Official Charts)	4
Belgian Albums (Ultratop Flanders)	63
Belgian Albums (Ultratop Wallonia)	82
Swedish Albums (Sverigetopplistan)	42
Dutch Albums (Album Top 100)	129
Spanish Albums (Promusicae)	34
Swiss Albums (Schweizer Hitparade)	98

== Personnel ==
Credits for Here are adapted from AllMusic and the album's liner notes.

Teenage Fanclub

- Norman Blake
- Gerard Love
- Raymond McGinley
- Francis Macdonald
- David McGowan

Additional musicians

- John McCusker – viola, violin on "The Darkest Part of the Night"
- Elspeth Mackay – cello on "The Darkest Part of the Night"
- Robert Henderson – trumpet on "The First Sight"
- Nigel Baillie – trumpet on "Live in the Moment"
- Helen Thomson – harp on "Live in the Moment"

Technical

- Teenage Fanclub – producer
- David Henderson – engineer
- Raymond McGinley – engineer
- Bertrand Montandon – assistant engineer (Vega)
- Quentin Tillie – assistant engineer (Vega)
- Linda Gerdes – assistant engineer (Clouds Hills)
- Sebastian Muxfeldt – assistant engineer (Clouds Hills)
- Sean Magee – mastering
- Krista Blake – sleeve design
