= Golden Glades =

Golden Glades may refer to:

- Golden Glades Interchange, an interchange where I-95, the Palmetto Expressway, Florida's Turnpike, and U.S. Route 441 meet in northern Miami-Dade County, Florida, United States
- Golden Glades, Florida, census-designated place near the above mention location
- "Golden Glades", a song by Teenage Fanclub from their 1993 album Thirteen
