= Fallin' (Teenage Fanclub and De La Soul song) =

Single by Teenage Fanclub and De La Soul

from the album Judgment Night Soundtrack
- Released: 1994
- Recorded: 1993
- Genre: Rap rock; alternative rock; power pop
- Length: 4:28
- Label: Immortal
- Songwriters: K. Mercer, D. Jolicoeur, V. Mason, N. Blake, G. Love, R. McGinley, B. O'Hare
- Producers: Teenage Fanclub, De La Soul

De La Soul singles chronology
"Ego Trippin' (Part Two)" (1994)	"Fallin'" (1994)	"Stakes Is High" (1996)

Teenage Fanclub singles chronology
"Hang On" (1994)	"Fallin'" (1994)	"Sparky's Dream" (1995)

Music video
- "Fallin'" on YouTube

"Fallin'" is a collaboration between Scottish power pop band Teenage Fanclub and American alternative hip hop trio De La Soul. It was released in early 1994. The song was recorded for the soundtrack to the action film Judgment Night, which featured other collaborations between well-known rock, metal and hip hop groups. The chorus was sampled from the song "Free Fallin'" from Tom Petty's 1989 solo album Full Moon Fever.

== Music video ==
The "Fallin'" music video was directed by Josh Taft. It features De La Soul and Teenage Fanclub wandering the hallways and classrooms of a high school while children dressed as angels dance around during a school play.

== Track listing ==
1. "Fallin'" (album version)
2. "Fallin'" (acapella)
3. "Fallin'" (remix)
4. "Fallin'" (instrumental)

== Charts ==
Chart (1994)	Peak Position
UK Singles Chart	59

== See also ==
- Judgment Night track listing
