= Ain't That Enough =

Single by Teenage Fanclub

from the album Songs from Northern Britain
- B-side: "Kickabout"; "Broken"; "Femme Fatale"; "Jesus Christ"
- Released: 30 June 1997
- Recorded: 1996
- Genre: Power pop; jangle pop
- Length: 3:42
- Label: Creation
- Songwriter: Gerard Love
- Producers: David Bianco; Norman Blake; Love; Raymond McGinley; Paul Quinn

Teenage Fanclub singles chronology
"About You" (1995)	"Ain't That Enough" (1997)	"I Don't Want Control of You" (1997)

"Ain't That Enough" is a song recorded by the Scottish rock band Teenage Fanclub. The song was released on 30 June 1997 through Creation Records, as the lead single from the band's sixth studio album Songs from Northern Britain. The song was written and sung by vocalist and bassist Gerard Love. AllMusic biographer Matt Collar writes that the song touches on themes of "nature, romantic fidelity, and the passing of time."

The song peaked at number 17 on the UK Singles Chart, representing the band's best chart performance domestically.

== Reception ==
Paste writer Ben Salmon placed the song in the top spot of his 2018 ranking of the band's best songs, calling it a "masterwork of '90s electric guitar tone, a clinic on melody making and harmony singing, and a lesson about optimizing our limited time here on Earth [...] 'Ain't That Enough' is an ecstatic exhale of a song bathed in sunlight."

== Charts ==
Chart (1997)	Peak position
UK Singles (Official Charts)	17
