= Songs from Northern Britain =

Studio album by Teenage Fanclub
- Released: 29 July 1997
- Recorded: 20 May–10 July 1996, 1–7 December 1996, 3–8 February 1997
- Studios: Ridge Farm (Surrey) (Note: Recorded at Ridge Farm between 20 May–10 July 1996.); Abbey Road (London) (Note: Strings and brass recorded at Abbey Road on 16 June 1996.); AIR (London) (Note: Recorded at AIR between 1–7 December 1996 and 3–8 February 1997. Mixed at AIR between 12–24 January and 3–8 February 1997.)
- Genres: Alternative rock; power pop; jangle pop
- Length: 43:24
- Label: Creation
- Producers: David Bianco; Teenage Fanclub

Teenage Fanclub chronology
Grand Prix (1995)	Songs from Northern Britain (1997)	Howdy! (2000)

Singles from Songs from Northern Britain
- 1. "Ain't That Enough" Released: June 1997; 2. "I Don't Want Control of You" Released: August 1997; 3. "Start Again" Released: October 1997

Songs from Northern Britain is the sixth studio album by Scottish alternative rock band Teenage Fanclub. Produced by David Bianco and the band, the album was released on 29 July 1997 through Creation Records. Teenage Fanclub's previous album, Grand Prix, had been seen as a comeback in their home of the UK, though its success elsewhere was limited. With more time and resources, the band recorded Songs from Northern Britain—a tongue-in-cheek title referring to their native Scotland—with producer David Bianco in Surrey. The record's lyrical themes focus heavily on love and domestic life. The album was completed at London's AIR Studios, and its accompanying artwork was taken by photographer Donald Milne around the Scottish Highlands.

Upon its release, the album received mainly positive reviews from music critics. Commercially, Songs from Northern Britain saw Teenage Fanclub achieve their highest chart positions in the UK, with the record peaking at number three on the UK Albums Chart. "Ain't That Enough", the lead single from the LP, became their best-charting single in the UK as well, peaking at number 17. Despite a high-profile tour with Radiohead, the album fared poorly in the US. The album saw a re-release on vinyl in 2018, alongside four other Teenage Fanclub albums.

== Background ==
By 1997, Teenage Fanclub had released five albums and toured heavily. When it came time to record their sixth effort, frontman Norman Blake felt as though the band were in a positive place. He later considered it to be a continuation of the band's previous album, Grand Prix, and the new effort was co-produced with that album's producer, David Bianco. The bulk of recording with Bianco was completed at Ridge Farm in Surrey in mid-1996. However, the group had a "falling out" with Bianco during the recording process, so the album was finished with the help of George Shilling at London's AIR Studios in late 1996. Choosing London was a conscious effort, as the band hoped to switch their locale during each recording process.

The band planned to record and mix the album in seven weeks, but found themselves recording longer than expected. They returned to mix the album later, which was beneficial as it gave them time to give the songs another look. In 2016, Norman Blake ranked Songs from Northern Britain as his second favorite album by the band, remembering, "I think we had been on a bit of a roll at this point. Everyone was happy." He ranked "I Don't Want Control of You" as one of his favorite songs he had written. Musically, the album was influenced by the Byrds, particularly with the harmonies, and Badfinger, which was a primary source of inspiration for Blake at the time of recording. In contrast to Grand Prix, which was largely tracked live, the band took their time with Songs from Northern Britain, taking the time to perfect harmony arrangements and introduce new musical elements, such as a minimoog, present in songs like "Planets".

The photography for the album was taken by Donald Milne, and was shot around the Scottish Highlands during a three-day road trip in spring 1997. The original press release for the album details the trip: "They visited the nuclear power station at Torness, saw the funfair being dismantled at Aviemore and played a round of golf under the gaze of Ben Nevis. It didn't rain once." The band have described the album title as "a joking reference to Britpop, and everybody who thought we were part of that scene". Blake expanded on the title in 2016, commenting, "We just thought it sounded funny. No one calls Scotland "Northern Britain," although technically it is."

== Commercial performance ==
Songs from Northern Britain was mainly a success in the United Kingdom, where it peaked at number three on the Albums Chart. "Ain't That Enough" became the band's highest-charting single, reaching number 17 in the UK. "I Don't Want Control of You" followed, peaking at number 43, and "Start Again" was the album's final single, reaching number 53.

Columbia Records distributed the album in the United States, taking over from DGC/Geffen. The label planned to emphasize college radio stations in marketing the album, aiming to group them in with the burgeoning alt-country scene, such as Wilco and the Jayhawks. The band toured with Radiohead in the U.S., for what was considered one of that year's most "eagerly anticipated outings," according to journalist Dave Thompson. Despite these efforts, the album failed to chart in the U.S.

== Reception ==
Professional ratings
Review scores
Source	Rating
AllMusic	4.5/5 stars
Chicago Tribune	3/4 stars
Encyclopedia of Popular Music	5/5 stars
Entertainment Weekly	C−
Mojo	4/5 stars
NME	7/10
Pitchfork	4.9/10 (1997); 8.3/10 (2018)
Q	4/5 stars
Rolling Stone	2/5 stars
Uncut	8/10

Upon its release, Songs from Northern Britain received mainly positive reviews from music critics. Rick Reger of the Chicago Tribune considered it among their strongest LPs, while noting that "there are no surprises on Songs from Northern Britain, no changes in direction, just catchier tunes and a lot more of them." Elisabeth Vincentelli, writing for Rolling Stone, criticised what she felt was a "homogeneous" sound to the record, summarizing, "Overall, Songs is soothing to the point of narcolepsy." At AllMusic, reviewer Matt Collar held a similar sentiment, admitting that it "may be too gentle and subtle for those listeners not willing to give it more than one spin." However, he praised the album's musical diversity and optimistic tone, considering it "a resolutely beautiful album that will most likely stand as Teenage Fanclub's masterpiece." It was voted number 966 in Colin Larkin's All Time Top 1000 Albums 3rd Edition (2000). A reviewer for Q viewed it as a "a willfully murkier, momentum-halting record," criticizing the writing on the album as trite. The original review for Pitchfork by Brent DiCrescenzo negatively compared its sound to dentist office waiting room music, though it acknowledged that "this album has its moments of jangly, sun-drenched, harvest pop pleasure." Retrospective reviews to the album have been more kind. Ryan Bray at The A.V. Club praised its "classic yet contemporary" nature, while bemoaning that the band seemed to lose followers as they grew older and more mature: "Songs From Northern Britain's legacy is an unfortunate one, an example of a great record that struggled to find a home beyond its loyal admirers." Sam Sodomsky, reviewing the 2018 vinyl reissues for Pitchfork, commented that "In both its thematic concerns and its gentle, pastoral tone, Songs From Northern Britain is an embrace of native terrain. Their contentment sounds radiant."

In his book 31 Songs, Nick Hornby names Songs from Northern Britain as one of his favourite albums. He names the introduction to the book after "Your Love Is the Place Where I Come From", and also praises "Ain't That Enough".

== Track listing ==
Songs from Northern Britain track listing
No.	Title	Writer(s)	Length
1.	"Start Again"	Norman Blake	3:11
2.	"Ain't That Enough"	Gerard Love	3:42
3.	"Can't Feel My Soul"	Raymond McGinley	3:21
4.	"I Don't Want Control of You"	Blake	3:08
5.	"Planets"	Blake; Francis Macdonald	2:50
6.	"It's a Bad World"	McGinley	4:20
7.	"Take the Long Way Round"	Love	3:25
8.	"Winter"	Blake	3:46
9.	"I Don't Care"	McGinley	3:06
10.	"Mount Everest"	Love	5:15
11.	"Your Love Is the Place Where I Come From"	McGinley	3:29
12.	"Speed of Light"	Love	3:53

== Personnel ==
Credits adapted from the album's liner notes.

Teenage Fanclub

- Norman Blake – vocals, guitar
- Gerard Love – vocals, bass guitar
- Raymond McGinley – vocals, guitar
- Paul Quinn – drums

Additional musicians

- George Borowski – backing vocals, guitar
- David Bianco – piano
- James SK Wān – xylophone
- Sonia Slany – strings
- Jocelyn Pook – strings
- Ann Morfee – strings
- Dinah Beamish – strings
- Susan Bell – strings
- Claire Orsler – strings
- Sara Herbert – strings
- Jules Singleton – strings
- Neil Sidwell – brass
- Steve Sidwell – brass
- Jamie Talbot – brass
- Dave Bishop – brass

Technical

- David Bianco – producer (except tracks 1 and 3), engineer (except tracks 1 and 3)
- Teenage Fanclub – producer (all tracks), mixing
- Jamie Seyberth – engineer (except tracks 1 and 3)
- George Schilling – engineer (tracks 1 and 3), mixing
- Phil Luff – assistant engineer
- Ricky Graham – assistant engineer
- Nick Wollage – assistant engineer
- Chris Blair – mastering (at Abbey Road)
- Blue Source – art direction
- Donald Milne – photography

== Charts ==
Chart performance for Songs from Northern Britain
Chart (1997–2026)	Peak position
Australian Albums (ARIA)	70
Finnish Albums (Suomen virallinen lista)	39
Greek Albums (IFPI)	95
Norwegian Albums (VG-lista)	12
Scottish Albums (Official Charts)	3
Swedish Albums (Sverigetopplistan)	28
UK Albums (Official Charts)	3

== Certifications ==
Region	Certification	Certified units/sales
United Kingdom (BPI)	Silver	60,000^{*}
^{*} Sales figures based on certification alone.
