= The King (Teenage Fanclub album) =

Studio album by Teenage Fanclub
- Released: 27 August 1991
- Genre: Alternative rock; noise; lo-fi
- Length: 32:38
- Label: Creation
- Producer: Don Fleming, Paul Chisholm, Teenage Fanclub

Teenage Fanclub chronology
| A Catholic Education (1990) | The King (1991) | Bandwagonesque (1991) |

The King is the second studio album by Scottish alternative rock band Teenage Fanclub, deleted on its day of release in 1991.

The album is often derided as a hastily assembled contractual obligation to US label Matador (allowing the group to sign to Geffen without penalty). In 2020, Matador co-owner Gerard Cosloy confirmed that The King was pitched to the label as the second release, but passed, saying it felt more like a contractual obligation fulfillment than a real album. However the group have denied this, claiming that the shambolic, spontaneous nature of the contents was a direct influence of producer Don Fleming, whose music was often improvised. "One night we all got completely wasted. ... and we said, "Let’s make an LP overnight. We’ll just improvise some songs and do some covers and cobble it all together", Norman Blake said in 2016. In a 2006 interview, Blake and Brendan O'Hare confirmed that the album had been recorded immediately after completing Bandwagonesque using pre-booked studio time that became available when the aforementioned album was finished sooner than anticipated. They also claimed that the album was intended to be a mid-price edition of 1,000 but their then UK label Creation Records pressed 20,000 and sold them at full price.

The album was rereleased on vinyl for Record Store Day 2019.

== Overview ==
The King originated during the recording sessions for Bandwagonesque at Liverpool's Amazon Studios. Guitarist-vocalist Norman Blake was impressed by the studio's equipment quality, table football facilities and kitchen. He said both albums were recorded at the same session and described The King as "an album within an album" recorded "really just to entertain ourselves". The King is described by Record Collection as "a rough bunch of songs recorded in a day at Amazon under the influence of Fleming's predilection for improv". Blake recalled: "One night we all got completely wasted. We were only 22 at the time, and Don Fleming was there and we said, 'Let's make a LP overnight. We’ll just improvise some songs and do some covers and cobble it all together'."

Blake has said that the idea for the album's release was for Creation Records to press up either 500 or 1,000 copies of the album as a limited edition and "it would just be this boutique thing that would appear and disappear", but that, despite this, Creation "ended up printing maybe a few more thousand than we expected." He later said that Creation pressed 10,000 copies. By early November 1991, Teenage Fanclub were eager for Bandwagonesque to be released, as a means of "[helping] get rid of the bad taste their quickie out-takes album The King left in their mouths", according to one contemporary report. Gerard Love explained: "Everythin' got out of hand. The stuff would have come out on bootleg at some point, so what we wanted to do was shove it out really cheap. Rather than people playing a fiver for a shite quality tape they could get a good quality album for £3.49". Raymond McGinley continued:

"It didn't really work. Shops were treatin' it like a proper release and chargin' full-whack. It got a little out of hand and we didn't want people to think that it was us rippin' them off so we deleted it straight away."

Though Teenage Fanclub submitted it as their second album for their American label Matador, the company refused to release it. McGinley recalled: "In the end, because we did the two-album deal we ended up having to give Matador a settlement. It got a bit messy." Everett True of Melody Maker also described the instrumental The King as a contractual obligation album in his October 1991 interview with the band. Blake and McGinley explained their fondness for the album but would have preferred if it had been priced at the intended cost of £2.99, "instead of the $60 they're currently charging for an import [in the United States]". Both members also quashed the rumours popular in New York City that the album was in fact solely recorded by local rock band Gumball (whose guitarist was Don Fleming) as a snub to Matador. The King was released in August 1991 and reached number 53 on the UK Albums Chart. Apparently deleted on the day of release, it quickly became a collector's item.

== Reception and legacy ==
Professional ratings
Review scores
| Source | Rating |
|---|---|
| The Encyclopedia of Popular Music | 2/5 stars |
| The Great Rock Discography | 4/10 |

In 1991, NME writer Terry Staunton called it "quickie out-takes album". In 1992, The King was described by Chris Mundy of Rolling Stone as "a ragged set of instrumental jams and a cover of Madonna's 'Like a Virgin'", and by Steven Daly of Spin as "a half-hearted album of instrumentals". Mundy and Daly, both writing for American publications, reiterated that the album was given to their former indie label Matador as a contractual obligation, instead of handing them the already-completed Bandwagonesque, which they released to issue on DGC instead.

Similarly, Rob Hughes of Uncut, in 2003, described The King as "an album of improvised noise" that was issued to expedite a hasty exit from Matador in the US and "which, as was intended, ensured a clear path to DGC." Martin Horsfield of The Guardian describes The King as "instantly deleted and tossed-out". Alexis Petridis, also of The Guardian, describes it as Teenage Fanclub's "perplexing second album", containing "seven grungy instrumental originals and covers of Pink Floyd's 'Interstellar Overdrive' and Madonna's 'Like a Virgin'". The BBC have described The King as a "deliberately obscure instrumental album", and "a thrashy mess".

Retrospective critical opinion on The King's quality has varied. The music author Mark Bennett has described it as "a frankly rubbish set of instrumental covers." In The Rough Guide to Rock (1999), James Owen described the limited edition instrumental album as a "backhanded tribute" to Elvis Presley, believing that it "failed to satisfy existing fans or to garner new ones." In The Great Rock Discography (2006), Martin C. Strong described The King as "a substandard effort released to fulfill contractual obligations". More favourably, Ira Robbins and Matthew Kaplan of Trouser Press deem the "hastily tossed together" record to be "an interesting curio", noting its "quizzical" choice of covers and believing the majority of the original material to be "quite interesting", as is guest Joe McAlinden's "skronking" saxophone. Robbins and Kaplin particularly noted "Opal Inquest" for its Bevis Frond-esque guitar indulengeces and "Robot Love" for its Butthole Surfers influence and its unrecognisably distorted vocals. The Line of Best Fit's Chris Todd opined that, despite containing "Bandwagonesque leftovers", The King has its merits.

In 2010, Dom Gourlay of Drowned in Sound wrote that "the ramshackle lo-fi of A Catholic Education and The King undoubtedly provided food for thought for young upstarts like Urusei Yatsura and Mogwai". Donald Milne of Guitar.com characterises the album as "largely improvised".

== Opinions of band members and cancelled follow-up ==
In 2016, Blake ranked it the ninth best Teenage Fanclub album in a list for Vice, again calling it "an album we made within Bandwagonesque" and categorising it as "an album, but it's unofficial in a way". He enjoys The King as he enjoyed improvising, calling it "fun to do" and an idea the group were more open to doing at the time than they later became, but believed it to be the band's least-focused record. Love says he has fond memories of recording The King but that he hasn't listened to it since release "because it's just a racket, y’know? It's good sometimes to do that kind of thing, and I'm glad we did it, but I don’t think we'd want to do it again and again because it’s better to play to your strengths a bit."

McGinley explained in a 1993 Melody Maker that Teenage Fanclub began working on a follow-up to The King during the recording of Thirteen (1993): "We got about 30 basic tracks down and then we started working on The King 2 as well, so we had a lot of tape lying around! We haven't even listened to the instrumental tracks we did for The King 2 yet, we haven't had time." In 2016, Blake said the group no longer had interest in improvising and commented: "I can't see us doing a King 2."

== Track listing ==
All tracks are written by Teenage Fanclub unless otherwise noted.

| No. | Title | Writer(s) | Length |
|---|---|---|---|
| 1. | "Heavy Metal 6" | | 1:31 |
| 2. | "Mudhoney" | | 6:04 |
| 3. | "Interstellar Overdrive" | Syd Barrett, Roger Waters, Richard Wright, Nick Mason | 3:24 |
| 4. | "Robot Love" | | 2:16 |
| 5. | "Like a Virgin" | Tom Kelly, Billy Steinberg | 4:31 |
| 6. | "The King" | | 2:23 |
| 7. | "Opal Inquest" | Paul Chisholm, Teenage Fanclub | 5:36 |
| 8. | "The Ballad of Bow Evil (Slow And Fast)" | | 5:26 |
| 9. | "Heavy Metal 9" | | 1:27 |

== Personnel ==
Teenage Fanclub

- Norman Blake – guitar, vocals
- Gerard Love – bass, vocals
- Raymond McGinley – guitar, vocals
- Brendan O'Hare – drums

Additional musicians

- Joe McAlinden – saxophone
- Paul Chisholm – additional drums

Technical

- Don Fleming – producer
- Teenage Fanclub – producer
- Paul Chisholm – producer, engineer
- Keith Hartley – engineer
- Dave Buchanan – assistant engineer
