= Words of Wisdom and Hope =

Studio album by Teenage Fanclub and Jad Fair
- Released: 4 March 2002
- Studio: Riverside Studios, Glasgow; Tracks 3, 10 and 11 recorded up a lane in Finnieston, Glasgow
- Genre: Alternative rock
- Length: 53:20
- Label: Geographic (Europe); Alternative Tentacles (US)
- Producer: Teenage Fanclub; Jad Fair

Teenage Fanclub chronology
Howdy! (2000)	Words of Wisdom and Hope (2002)	Four Thousand Seven Hundred And Sixty-Six Seconds - A Shortcut To Teenage Fanclub (2003)

Singles from Words of Wisdom and Hope
- 1. "Near to You" Released: 4 February 2002

Professional ratings
Review scores
Source	Rating
AllMusic	3.5/5 stars
NME	3/5 stars
Pitchfork	(5.0/10)

Words of Wisdom and Hope is an album produced in collaboration between Glasgow, Scotland's Teenage Fanclub and Half Japanese frontman Jad Fair. It was released on 4 March 2002 on Domino's subsidiary label Geographic in Europe and on Alternative Tentacles in the US.

== Critical reception ==
NME wrote that "with amiable janglers the Fanclub providing a predictibly pleasant backdrop, Jad‘s syrupy ruminations on life -think Lou Reed on prozac- take on a certain primitive charm." The Guardian wrote that "Teenage Fanclub make an ideal backing band, providing soft bubbles of guitar in 'Love Will Conquer' and bringing a surprisingly soulful touch to 'Power of Your Tenderness' and 'You Rock.'"

== Track listing ==
All lyrics are written by Jad Fair; all music is composed by Teenage Fanclub

No.	Title	Length
1.	"Behold the Miracle"	3:47
2.	"I Feel Fine"	3:28
3.	"Near to You"	4:13
4.	"Smile"	4:48
5.	"Crush on You"	7:07
6.	"Cupid"	6:36
7.	"Power of Your Tenderness"	3:57
8.	"Vampire's Claw"	3:45
9.	"Secret Heart"	2:37
10.	"You Rock"	5:36
11.	"Love's Taken Over"	4:01
12.	"Good Thing"	3:23

== Personnel ==
Adapted from the album's liner notes.

- Jad Fair — vocals
- Norman Blake — guitar, bass, keyboards
- Raymond McGinley — guitar, mandola
- Finlay Macdonald — keyboards, bass
- Gerard Love — guitar, bass, drums
- Paul Quinn — drums, guitar

Additional musicians

- Katrina Mitchell — vocals, drums

Technical

- Teenage Fanclub — producer
- Jad Fair — producer, cover art
- Johnny Cameron — engineer
- Steve Rooke — mastering
