= I Don't Want Control of You =

Single by Teenage Fanclub

from the album Songs from Northern Britain
- B-side: "The Count"; "Middle of the Road"; "He'd Be a Diamond"; "Live My Life"
- Released: 18 August 1997
- Recorded: 1996
- Genre: Power pop; jangle pop
- Length: 3:08
- Label: Creation
- Songwriter: Norman Blake
- Producers: David Bianco; Blake; Love; Raymond McGinley; Paul Quinn

Teenage Fanclub singles chronology
| "Ain't That Enough" (1997) | "I Don't Want Control of You" (1997) | "Start Again" (1997) |

"I Don't Want Control of You" is a song recorded by Scottish rock band Teenage Fanclub. The song was released on 18 August 1997 through Creation Records, as the second single from the band's sixth studio album Songs from Northern Britain. The song was written and sung by vocalist and guitarist Norman Blake.

The song peaked at number 43 on the UK Singles Chart.

== Background ==
Norman Blake, in a 2016 interview, considered it among his personal favorite songs by the band:

"I Don't Want Control of You" is one of my favorite songs I've written. I still enjoy playing it. I achieved what I was aiming for there. I like how it has a key change. As a musician and a songwriter, I feel like I got pretty close to achieving what was in my head.

== Reception ==
The song was made NME single of the week by Keith Cameron.

Matt Collar, in a review of Songs from Northern Britain on AllMusic, considered the song "one of the most beautiful affirmations of fidelity in a relationship." Pitchfork contributor Sam Sodomsky called it a "brilliantly unguarded" love song, while James Cosby at PopMatters praised the tune's "bold, sometimes rather astonishing lyrical observations."

== Charts ==
| Chart (1997) | Peak position |
|---|---|
| UK Singles (OCC) | 43 |
