= Howard Quicksell =

Howard Quicksell (December 22, 1901 – October 30, 1953) was an American composer and banjoist.

== Biography ==
He was featured on banjo with the Jean Goldkette orchestra from 1922 until 1927, one of just two mainstays (saxophonist Doc Ryker was the other) with the Goldkette band from inception to demise. During this period he also recorded with pick-up groups led by Bix Beiderbecke and Frank Trumbauer.

He co-composed the songs "Sorry" and "Since My Best Gal Turned Me Down," both recorded by Bix Beiderbecke. The former was also recorded by Fletcher Henderson, while the latter was featured in Woody Allen's film Sweet and Lowdown. Other notable Quicksell compositions include "Pardon The Glove" and "Dustin' The Donkey" (a.k.a. "The Pay Off"), both recorded by the California Ramblers as well as by other dance bands of the period, as well as the words for "You Are Just A Vision," recorded by the Goldkette Orchestra on Victor.

Quicksell left the music business in the 1930s and was employed for many years by a Michigan distillery. He later lived in Des Moines, Iowa.

He died on October 30, 1953, in Pontiac, Michigan.
