= The Concept (song) =

Single by Teenage Fanclub

from the album Bandwagonesque
- B-side: "What You Do to Me (demo)"; "Long Hair"; "Robot Love"; "Star Sign"
- Released: 21 October 1991
- Recorded: 1991
- Genre: Power pop; indie pop; noise pop
- Length: 6:07
- Label: Creation
- Songwriter: Norman Blake
- Producers: Don Fleming; Paul Chisholm; Norman Blake; Gerard Love; Raymond McGinley; Brendan O'Hare

Teenage Fanclub singles chronology
"Star Sign" (1991)	"The Concept" (1991)	"What You Do to Me" (1992)

"The Concept" is a song recorded by Scottish rock band Teenage Fanclub. The song was released on 21 October 1991 through Creation Records, as the second single from the band's third studio album Bandwagonesque. The song was written and sung by vocalist and guitarist Norman Blake.

The song peaked at number 12 on Billboard's Modern Rock Tracks chart in the US, and at number 51 on the UK Singles Chart.

== Background ==
The song lyrically centres on the object of the narrator's affection, a woman described in the song's opening lines:

She wears denim wherever she goes Says she's gonna get some records by the Status Quo

Writer James Cosby of PopMatters finds the lyric "a bit tongue-in-cheek," and calls the song "a quite clear character study of maybe anyone in a "scene". Blake goes on to sing rather thoughtfully in describing a woman who really is pretty cool and hip—though maybe a bit too much for her own good." Blake, in a 2015 interview, revealed the song's lyrics came together only twenty minutes prior to recording the song. He remembered that much of Bandwagonesque contained lyrics written in an impromptu manner, and that his only goal with "The Concept" was to "write something with a narrative."

== Reception ==
Spin writer Andrew Unterberger called the song "instantly iconic." NME contributor Dan Stubbs singled it out as the best track from Bandwagonesque. Martin Horsfield at The Guardian ranked it as the band's second-best song, calling it "equal parts bubblegum and Big Star, and with an extended guitar coda for anyone pining for [their former] grungy sound." Paste writer Ben Salmon placed the song at number three on his 2018 ranking, describing it a "a six-minute celebration of jangling electric guitars, harmony vocals and band hangers-on that changes from rock song to breezy outro about halfway through." James Cosby at PopMatters placed it higher at number two, calling it the group's "de facto anthem."

Pitchfork said, "By the fist-pumping coda—a marvel of searing guitars, bombastic drums, and wistful three-part harmonies—it's clear that frontman Norman Blake isn't in love with the girl so much as he relishes the idea of being in the band onstage, basking in the glow of raised lighters."

== Charts ==
Chart (1991/1992)	Peak position
UK Singles (Official Charts)	51
US Alternative Airplay (Billboard)	12
