= Bandwagonesque =

1991 studio album by Teenage Fanclub

Studio album by Teenage Fanclub
- Released: 4 November 1991
- Recorded: 9 April – 12 May 1991
- Studios: Amazon (Liverpool, England)
- Genres: Alternative rock; power pop; jangle pop; noise pop
- Length: 42:56
- Labels: Creation; DGC
- Producers: Don Fleming; Paul Chisholm; Teenage Fanclub

Teenage Fanclub chronology
The King (1991)	Bandwagonesque (1991)	Thirteen (1993)

Singles from Bandwagonesque
- 1. "Star Sign" Released: 12 August 1991; 2. "The Concept" Released: 21 October 1991; 3. "What You Do to Me" Released: 27 January 1992

Bandwagonesque is the third studio album by the Scottish alternative rock band Teenage Fanclub, released in November 1991 by Creation Records. The album gave the band substantial US success when the single "Star Sign" reached number four on the Billboard Modern Rock Tracks chart, becoming their biggest hit in that country, with "What You Do to Me" and "The Concept" also becoming top-20 hits on that chart. Bandwagonesque was voted "album of the year" for 1991 by American music magazine Spin, beating R.E.M.'s Out of Time and Nirvana's Nevermind; the magazine has subsequently both apologised for and defended the selection. The album peaked at number 22 in the UK and 137 in the US.

== Background and recording ==
Teenage Fanclub released their debut album, A Catholic Education, in 1990 on the small independent label Paperhouse, and followed it up with the God Knows It's True EP before signing with Creation Records.

Following an encounter with Don Fleming at CBGB in New York City in March 1991, Teenage Fanclub started recording at Amazon Studios in Liverpool, with Fleming as producer. Fleming encouraged the band to work on adding vocal harmonies, noting that not many of their contemporaries were doing so.

The album's release was preceded by that of The King, an album of covers and outtakes recorded using leftover studio time from the Bandwagonesque sessions.

== Cover art ==
The cover was designed by Sharon Fitzgerald. When Kiss member Gene Simmons, who had trademarked the logo of a moneybag with dollar symbol, was made aware of the record, he sent a letter to Geffen Records, who in turn gave in and sent Simmons a cheque, according to Simmons's book Sex Money Kiss.

== Reception ==
Professional ratings
Review scores
Source	Rating
AllMusic	5/5 stars
Chicago Tribune	4/4 stars
Entertainment Weekly	B
Mojo	5/5 stars
NME	9/10
Pitchfork	8.7/10
Q	4/5 stars
Rolling Stone	2/5 stars
The Rolling Stone Album Guide	4/5 stars
Uncut	10/10

The liner notes to the 2009 Big Star box set Keep an Eye on the Sky said that Bandwagonesque was "an album so in thrall to Chilton, Bell, and company that some critics had taken to calling it 'Big Star's 4th.'"

== Legacy ==
In 2000, Bandwagonesque was voted number 386 in Colin Larkin's All Time Top 1000 Albums. In 2013, NME ranked Bandwagonesque at number 115 on its list of the 500 greatest albums of all time.

Bandwagonesque was performed live in its entirety in 2006 as part of the All Tomorrow's Parties-curated Don't Look Back series.

"The Concept" was also featured prominently in the 2011 film Young Adult. "What You Do To Me" was featured in the 2013 film The World's End and on its soundtrack album.

On July 28, 2017, Benjamin Gibbard of Death Cab for Cutie released Bandwagonesque, an album covering the original 1991 release. He noted that it was "[his] favorite record by [his] favorite band of all time."

== Track listing ==
No.	Title	Writer(s)	Length
1.	"The Concept"	Norman Blake	6:07
2.	"Satan"	Blake, Gerard Love, Raymond McGinley, Brendan O'Hare	1:22
3.	"December"	Love	3:03
4.	"What You Do to Me"	Blake	2:00
5.	"I Don't Know"	McGinley	4:36
6.	"Star Sign"	Love	4:53
7.	"Metal Baby"	Blake	3:39
8.	"Pet Rock"	Love	2:35
9.	"Sidewinder"	Love, O'Hare	3:03
10.	"Alcoholiday"	Blake	5:26
11.	"Guiding Star"	Love	2:48
12.	"Is This Music?"	Love	3:18

== Personnel ==
Teenage Fanclub

- Norman Blake – vocals, guitar, bass (track 12)
- Gerard Love – vocals, bass, guitar (track 12)
- Raymond McGinley – guitar, vocals (track 5)
- Brendan O'Hare – drums, vocals (track 9)

Additional musicians

- Joseph McAlinden – brass and strings
- Don Fleming – occasional guitar and vocals
- Dave Buchanan – handclaps

Technical

- Don Fleming – production
- Teenage Fanclub – production, arrangements
- Paul Chisholm – production, engineering
- Keith Hartley – engineer
- Dave Buchanan – assistant engineering
- George Peckham – mastering
- Sharon Fitzgerald – cover design, photography

== Charts ==
Chart (1991–1992)	Peak position
Canada Top Albums/CDs (RPM)	67
Dutch Albums (Album Top 100)	84
UK Albums (Official Charts)	22

Chart (2018)	Peak position
Scottish Albums (Official Charts)	19

== Certifications ==
Region	Certification	Certified units/sales
United Kingdom (BPI)	Silver	60,000^{‡}
^{‡} Sales+streaming figures based on certification alone.
