= Star Sign (song) =

Single by Teenage Fanclub

from the album Bandwagonesque
- B-side: "Heavy Metal 6"; "Like a Virgin"; "Star Sign (Demo)"; "Star Sign"
- Released: 12 August 1991
- Recorded: 1991
- Genre: Power pop; shoegaze
- Length: 4:53
- Label: Creation
- Songwriter: Gerard Love
- Producers: Don Fleming; Paul Chisholm; Norman Blake; Love; Raymond McGinley; Brendan O'Hare

Teenage Fanclub singles chronology
"God Knows It's True" (1990)	"Star Sign" (1991)	"The Concept" (1991)

"Star Sign" is a song recorded by Scottish rock band Teenage Fanclub. The song was released on 12 August 1991 through Creation Records, as the lead single from the band's third studio album Bandwagonesque. The song was written and sung by vocalist and bassist Gerard Love.

The song peaked at number four on Billboard's Modern Rock Tracks chart, making it the band's best-charting song in the United States. It also hit number 44 on the UK Singles Chart.

== Charts ==
Chart (1991)	Peak position
UK Singles (OCC)	44
US Alternative Airplay (Billboard)	4
