= Grand Prix (album) =

Studio album by Teenage Fanclub
- Released: 29 May 1995
- Recorded: 5 September–9 October 1994
- Studio: The Manor, Shipton-on-Cherwell
- Genre: Power pop; jangle pop; Britpop; folk rock; country rock
- Length: 42:09
- Label: Creation; DGC
- Producer: David Bianco; Teenage Fanclub

Teenage Fanclub chronology
Deep Fried Fanclub (1995)	Grand Prix (1995)	Songs from Northern Britain (1997)

Singles from Grand Prix
- 1. "Mellow Doubt" Released: 27 March 1995; 2. "Sparky's Dream" Released: 22 May 1995; 3. "Neil Jung" Released: 21 August 1995; 4. "About You" Released: 1995

Grand Prix is the fifth studio album by Scottish alternative rock band Teenage Fanclub, released in May 1995 via Creation Records.

== Album cover ==
The now-defunct Formula One racing team Simtek provided the car that appears on the front cover.

== Reception ==
Professional ratings
Review scores
Source	Rating
AllMusic	4.5/5 stars
Entertainment Weekly	C+
The Guardian	5/5 stars
Mojo	5/5 stars
NME	9/10
Pitchfork	8.5/10
Q	5/5 stars
The Rolling Stone Album Guide	4/5 stars
Spin	4/10
Uncut	8/10

Upon release, Grand Prix received almost unanimous critical acclaim. Writing for The Independent, Andy Gill called it "winsome and reflective", while Angela Lewis of the same publication described Grand Prix as a "breathtakingly superb (album) with finely honed dynamics, nagging harmonies and deceptively simple lyrics". In 2018, Q placed Grand Prix at number 72 in its list of the "100 Greatest British Albums Ever". It was voted number 624 in the 3rd edition of Colin Larkin's All Time Top 1000 Albums (2018). In 2004, it made number 72 on The Observer Music Monthly's top 100 British albums list. In 2013, NME ranked it at number 282 in its list of the 500 Greatest Albums of All Time.

== Track listing ==
No.	Title	Writer(s)	Length
1.	"About You"	Raymond McGinley	2:41
2.	"Sparky's Dream"	Gerard Love	3:17
3.	"Mellow Doubt"	Norman Blake	2:42
4.	"Don't Look Back"	Love	3:43
5.	"Verisimilitude"	McGinley	3:31
6.	"Neil Jung"	Blake	4:48
7.	"Tears"	Blake	2:43
8.	"Discolite"	Love	3:07
9.	"Say No"	McGinley	3:12
10.	"Going Places"	Love	4:28
11.	"I'll Make It Clear"	Blake	2:33
12.	"I Gotta Know"	McGinley	3:27
13.	"Hardcore/Ballad"	Blake	1:48
Total length:			42:09

Australian bonus disc: Bonus B-Sides
No.	Title	Writer(s)	Length
1.	"About You" (acoustic version) (B-side of "Mellow Doubt")	McGinley	2:49
2.	"Between Us" (B-side of "Mellow Doubt")	Neil Innes	2:03
3.	"For You" (B-side of "Sparky's Dream")	McGinley	3:26
4.	"Try and Stop Me" (B-side of "Sparky's Dream")	Eddie Phillips, Kenny Pickett	2:27
5.	"Who Loves the Sun" (B-side of "Sparky's Dream")	Lou Reed	2:41
Total length:			13:18

Notes

- All bonus tracks produced by Teenage Fanclub. Tracks 1 and 2 recorded at Protocol Studios, London, engineered by Giles Hall, assisted by Delphine Carrier. Track 3 recorded at Protocol Studios, London, engineered by Giles Hall, and at The Greenhouse, London, engineered by Nick Wollage. Track 4 recorded at Riverside Studios, Glasgow, engineered by Duncan Cameron. Track 5 recorded at home by Norman Blake.

Grand Prix bonus 7" single

Side A
No.	Title	Writer(s)	Length
1.	"Discolite" (demo)	Love	3:29
2.	"Voicemail from Rodney Bingenheimer"		0:37
3.	"I Gotta Know" (demo)	McGinley	4:14

Side B
No.	Title	Length
1.	"Coffee Morning" (instrumental)	2:55
2.	"Norman's Answering Machine Message"	0:23
3.	"Untitled" (instrumental)	3:22
Total length:		15:00

Note

- First vinyl pressing with limited edition bonus 7".

== Personnel ==
Teenage Fanclub

- Norman Blake – vocals, guitar
- Gerard Love – vocals, bass guitar
- Raymond McGinley – vocals, guitar
- Paul Quinn – drums

Additional musicians

- David Bianco – occasional guitar, piano and vocals
- Nigel Hitchcock – alto saxophone on "About You"
- Jamie Talbot – tenor saxophone on "About You"
- Chris White – baritone saxophone on "About You"
- Steve Sidwell – trumpet on "About You" and "Tears"
- Dinah Beamish – cello on "Tears"
- Jules Singleton – violin on "Tears"
- Sonia Slany – violin and string arrangement on "Tears"
- Jocelyn Pook – viola on "Tears"
- Dave Barker – handclaps on "Sparky's Dream"
- Chas Banks – handclaps on "Mellow Doubt"
- Jim Parsons – handclaps on "Mellow Doubt"

Technical personnel

- David Bianco – producer, engineer, mixing (at Larrabee North, Los Angeles)
- Teenage Fanclub – producer, sleeve design
- Julie Gardner – assistant engineer (at The Manor)
- Jamie Seyberth – assistant engineer (at Larrabee North)
- Stephen Marcussen – mastering (at Precision Mastering, Los Angeles)
- Marcus Tomlinson – front cover photography
- John Andrews – cover shoot co-ordinator
- Robert Fisher – "Grand Prix" logo designer
- Toby Egeinick – sleeve layout

== Charts ==
Chart performance for Grand Prix
Chart (1995)	Peak position
Australian Albums (ARIA)	57
Swedish Albums (Sverigetopplistan)	33
UK Albums (OCC)	7

== Certifications ==
Region	Certification	Certified units/sales
United Kingdom (BPI)	Silver	60,000^{*}
^{*} Sales figures based on certification alone.
