= What You Do to Me (Teenage Fanclub song) =

Single by Teenage Fanclub

from the album Bandwagonesque
- B-side: "B-Side"; "Life's a Gas"; "Filler"; "Star Sign"
- Released: 27 January 1992
- Recorded: 1991
- Genre: Power pop
- Length: 2:00
- Label: Creation
- Songwriter: Norman Blake
- Producers: Don Fleming; Paul Chisholm; Blake; Love; Raymond McGinley; Brendan O'Hare

Teenage Fanclub singles chronology
"The Concept" (1991)	"What You Do to Me" (1992)	"Free Again" (1992)

"What You Do to Me" is a song recorded by Scottish rock band Teenage Fanclub. The song was released on 27 January 1992 through Creation Records, as the third single from the band's third studio album, Bandwagonesque (1991). The song was written and sung by vocalist and guitarist Norman Blake.

The song peaked at number 19 on Billboard's Modern Rock Tracks chart in the US, and number 31 on the UK Singles Chart.

== Charts ==
Chart (1992)	Peak position
UK Singles (OCC)	31
UK Airplay (Music Week)	35
US Alternative Airplay (Billboard)	19
