= Sparky's Dream =

Single by Teenage Fanclub

from the album Grand Prix
- B-side: "Try and Stop Me"; "That's All I Need to Know"; "Who Loves the Sun"
- Released: 22 May 1995
- Recorded: 1994
- Genre: Power pop; jangle pop
- Length: 3:15
- Label: Creation
- Songwriter: Gerard Love
- Producers: David Bianco; Norman Blake; Love; Raymond McGinley; Paul Quinn

Teenage Fanclub singles chronology
| "Fallin'" (1994) | "Sparky's Dream" (1995) | "Neil Jung" (1995) |

"Sparky's Dream" is a song recorded by Scottish rock band Teenage Fanclub. The song was released on 22 May 1995 through Creation Records, as the lead single from the band's fifth studio album Grand Prix. The song was sung by its author and bassist Gerard Love.

The song peaked at number 40 on the UK Singles Chart. The song has widely been considered among the group's best.

== Background ==
Vocalist and guitarist Norman Blake suggested the song's title when the band were recording demos for no particular reason; "it seemed like a good title because it was kind of dumb," Love told fan-site operator Chris Bray in 1995.

== Reception ==
Reviews of the song upon its release were positive; Variety columnist Troy J. Augusto dubbed it "hypnotically sweet." In a negative review of Grand Prix in Spin, reviewer Jason Cohen singled out "Sparky's Dream" as a "pleasant" if melodramatic highlight. AllMusic biographer Matt Collar has since listed it among the band's "best-loved" tunes, while Pitchfork reviewer Sam Sodomsky selected it among the band's "greatest". James Cosby at PopMatters ranked the song as the band's best, praising its "pure pop rush" as embodying "everything great about the [power pop]." Paste writer Ben Salmon placed the song at number two on his 2018 ranking, calling it a "classic love song [...] and a melodic monster."

== Charts ==
| Chart (1995) | Peak position |
|---|---|
| Scottish Singles Sales (Official Charts) | 9 |
| UK Singles (Official Charts) | 40 |
