= Neumu =

- Website: www.neumu.net
- Registration: Optional
- Current status: Dormant

Neumu is a music website that features news, reviews, columns and downloads. The website was founded by Emme Stone and Michael Goldberg, who currently serves as the Editor in Chief. The site's album reviews are excerpted by Metacritic and used as part of that site's average album score from professional reviews.

Although the site is still running, no new content has been posted to it since 2007, as lead editor Goldberg had largely moved onto working for MOG.

== Rating system ==
Neumu's rating system for albums is as follows:

- 10 — All-time classic. One of the best albums in the history of recorded music. Desert Island material for sure.
- 9 — Perfection. Nirvana. Almost as good as sex. We saw god, or at least experienced some kind of revelation.
- 8 — Exceptional album. We like everything about it.
- 7 — Consistently great album with several standout tracks.
- 6 — We like this a lot and think you will too.
- 5 — Good, solid album. If you like the artist's other recordings, this is probably worth your time.
- 4 — Most of this is pretty good.
- 3 — Some of this isn't bad. But most is.
- 2 — Not even suitable as a coaster to place cold drinks on.
- 1 — Makes you regret that you have ears.
