= A Catholic Education =

Studio album by Teenage Fanclub
- Released: 11 June 1990
- Recorded: July – December 1989
- Studios: Pet Sounds, Glasgow, Scotland; Suite 16, Rochdale, England
- Genres: Alternative rock; grunge
- Length: 39:46
- Labels: Paperhouse (Europe); Matador (North America)
- Producer: Teenage Fanclub

Teenage Fanclub chronology
A Catholic Education (1990)	The King (1991)

Singles from A Catholic Education
- 1. "Everything Flows" Released: June 1990; 2. "Everybody's Fool" Released: November 1990

A Catholic Education is the debut studio album by Scottish alternative rock band Teenage Fanclub, released in 1990.

The album received positive reviews from UK music journalists and critics.

"Everything Flows" was later included in the compilation albums Deep Fried Fanclub and Four Thousand Seven Hundred and Sixty-Six Seconds – A Short Cut to Teenage Fanclub. Those were released in 1995 and 2003, respectively.

== Background ==
Teenage Fanclub had been formed in 1989 as a continuation of what guitarists Norman Blake and Raymond McGinley and drummer Francis Macdonald had been doing in their previous band The Boy Hairdressers. Blake: "We’d been around a lot of people trying to get record deals, and we thought, "That’s too much like hard work, let’s just make a record." They managed to raise enough money to buy studio time at Pet Sounds Studios in Glasgow. Blake later said, "Raymond sold a fridge and a washing machine his neighbour had left him, and we made ‘A Catholic Education’ from that." Bassist Gerard Love: "I met Norman at a gig in May 1989, and then later on they asked if I’d be interested in joining them to record the album. By mid-July we were in the studio."

The album's dark, heavy sound has been described as differing in tone and style from the band's later power pop work. According to Blake, "the main influences on that first Teenage Fanclub album would've been Sonic Youth's Evol and Daydream Nation, those records. And we liked Exile on Main St. a lot. That was what we were predominantly listening to. And we liked Love a lot then. They were an influence. We liked Arthur Lee." Buffalo Springfield, the Beatles, and Neil Young also proved influential.

After finishing his drum parts for the album, Macdonald left the band to be replaced by Brendan O'Hare. Macdonald: "I’d always said, "I’m happy to be on the record, but I’ll probably go back to university and finish my studies afterwards." Even though the band now had an album’s worth of material, they weren’t completely happy with it, so they decided to re-record four songs at Suite 16 in Rochdale with O'Hare on drums.

The band originally intended to release the album themselves, but a tape of the recordings found its way to the two newly established independent record labels Paperhouse and Matador. Both labels ended up releasing the album, Paperhouse in the UK on 11 June 1990, and Matador in the US on 2 August 1990.

== Album title ==
Norman Blake said of the album title in 2016: "A Catholic Education was an irreverent thing, we thought it would get a reaction living in the west of Scotland and we knew people would say ‘what do they mean, what’s that all about,’ kind of thing. I wasn’t Catholic but I think we wanted to provoke a response. ... Certainly no one was angry with us for calling it that. We also meant it in the other meaning of Catholic being eclectic and bringing a lot of influences to the band. We just thought it sounded good as well."

== Reception ==
Professional ratings
Review scores
Source	Rating
AllMusic	4/5 stars
Chicago Tribune	3/4 stars
The Encyclopedia of Popular Music	3/5 stars
The Great Rock Discography	7/10
The Rolling Stone Album Guide	3/5 stars
Select	2/5

At the time of release, A Catholic Education received mainly positive reviews from music critics. In a retrospective review, Jason Ankeny of AllMusic noted that A Catholic Education's "gloriously sloppy and sludgy sound" was far removed from the "sparkling power pop" of their later albums. Instead, the album "prefigures the emergence of grunge, its viscous melodies and squalling guitars owing far more to Neil Young than Big Star." Ankeny concluded that despite the album's differences in attitude and approach, "there's no mistaking the effortless melodicism that remains the hallmark of all Teenage Fanclub records."

Trouser Press wrote that the band's "straightforward guitar pop" was presented in a "flattering light", but that the album suffered from uneven songwriting. They felt that after "Everything Flows," "Critical Mass," "Eternal Light" and "Everybody's Fool", "slim pickings keep A Catholic Education from being a full course."

== Track listing ==
No.	Title	Writer(s)	Length
1.	"Heavy Metal"	Raymond McGinley	2:14
2.	"Everything Flows"	Norman Blake	5:12
3.	"Catholic Education"	Blake	2:34
4.	"Too Involved"	Blake, McGinley	2:39
5.	"Don't Need a Drum"	Blake, McGinley	3:18
6.	"Critical Mass"	Blake	2:48
7.	"Heavy Metal II"	Blake, McGinley	7:22
8.	"Catholic Education 2"	Blake	3:02
9.	"Eternal Light"	Blake	4:12
10.	"Every Picture I Paint"	Blake, McGinley	3:23
11.	"Everybody's Fool"	Blake, Gerard Love, McGinley	2:54

US track listing
No.	Title	Writer(s)	Length
1.	"Everything Flows"	Blake	5:12
2.	"Everybody's Fool"	Blake, Love, McGinley	2:54
3.	"Catholic Education"	Blake	2:34
4.	"Eternal Light"	Blake	4:11
5.	"Heavy Metal"	McGinley	2:14
6.	"Critical Mass"	Blake	2:48
7.	"Too Involved"	Blake, McGinley	2:38
8.	"Don't Need a Drum"	Blake, McGinley	3:18
9.	"Every Picture I Paint"	Blake, McGinley	3:23
10.	"Catholic Education 2"	Blake	3:01
11.	"Heavy Metal II"	Blake, McGinley	7:21

== Personnel ==
Teenage Fanclub

- Norman Blake – vocals, guitar
- Gerard Love – bass
- Raymond McGinley – guitar
- Brendan O'Hare – drums
- Francis Macdonald – drums

Technical

- Ted Blakeway – engineering (Pet Sounds)
- Rex Sargeant – engineering (Suite 16)
