= Howdy =

Informal greeting

Howdy is an informal salutation in the English language often used in the Southern United States. Originally a shortened form of the inquiry How do ye?, it was first used in Southern England in the 18th century.

== Etymology ==
The word derives from the phrase "How do ye?," which was used in late 16th century England to ask about others' health. The phrase saw increasing degrees of dialectal contraction over time, first being contracted to "how dee," then to "howdy'ee," and finally to its modern form. Despite the etymology of the term, its modern usage is as a greeting and not as an inquiry.

== Use in different states ==
In many rural Southern and Western states, especially in Arizona, California, Colorado, Idaho, Montana, Nevada, New Mexico, Texas, and Wyoming, howdy is commonly used in casual contexts as a standard greeting. The term is commonly associated in popular culture specifically with the state of Texas, and the usage of the term is a significant and recognizable component of Texan English. Howdy is also the official greeting of Texas A&M University, though the two are not always automatically associated.
