= David Bianco (producer) =

American record producer

David Bianco (1954 – June 20, 2018) was an American Grammy Award-winning record producer, who worked with such artists as Tom Petty, Bob Dylan, Lucinda Williams, Fleetwood Mac, Ozzy Osbourne, Danzig, AC/DC, Cathedral, Primal Scream, Teenage Fanclub, Buffalo Tom, Claytown Troupe, The Posies, The Caulfields, Black Lab, The Damned, Buckcherry, Dropkick Murphys, Blues Traveler, Big Head Todd and the Monsters, Masters of Reality, Mick Jagger, Failure, Rollins Band and John Mellencamp.

He won a Grammy Award for the Best Engineered Album, Non-Classical, being Wildflowers by Tom Petty.

Bianco died in June 2018, from a stroke.
