= Thirteen (Teenage Fanclub album) =

Studio album by Teenage Fanclub
- Released: 4 October 1993
- Recorded: October 1992 – April 1993
- Studio: Ca Va Sound Workshops, Glasgow, Scotland; Revolution Studios, Cheadle Hulme, Cheshire, England
- Genre: Power pop
- Length: 47:41
- Label: Creation; DGC
- Producer: Teenage Fanclub; Andy MacPherson

Teenage Fanclub chronology
Bandwagonesque (1991)	Thirteen (1993)	Deep Fried Fanclub (1995)

Singles from Thirteen
- 1. "Radio" Released: 14 June 1993; 2. "Norman 3" Released: 20 September 1993; 3. "Hang On" Released: February 1994

Thirteen is the fourth studio album by Scottish alternative rock band Teenage Fanclub, released in 1993 on Creation Records in the UK and Geffen in the US. It was commonly believed at the time that it was named after the song "Thirteen" by Big Star, a band that has heavily influenced Teenage Fanclub. The self-produced album was poorly received by critics on its release. It peaked at number 14 on the UK Albums Chart.

== Background ==
Recording for the album began just a few weeks after finishing the Bandwagonesque tour in 1992. "It was difficult to make", guitarist Norman Blake said in 2018. "We went into the studio and we had 40 fragments of songs. Too much information, you know?" The band spent the next three to four months recording at Ca Va Sound Workshops in Glasgow, ending up with just fragmentary pieces that weren't quite finished songs. From there, the band eventually decamped to Revolution Studios outside of Manchester for another two or three months working on the material. "We kept revising it, re-recording it, and just generally trying to improve it," said bassist Gerard Love. The number of songs were then trimmed down to the ones that made up Thirteen and its corresponding B-sides. "We were relatively happy with it," Blake said, "but we’d become a bit disillusioned."

Some of the album's song titles are working titles. Blake: "Very often what happens is we have working titles that we ended up keeping. That explains "Commercial Alternative" and "Norman 3" – that's the third of my songs that we recorded for the album." In 2016, when asked about whether or not the album was named after the song "Thirteen" by Big Star, Blake said: "You know what? There were 13 songs on the record. But we were definitely listening to Big Star ... you can definitely hear Big Star’s influence in that music, along with a ton of other things at the time too." When asked about why Thirteen was his least favourite Teenage Fanclub album, Blake said: "I’d say the reasons are more circumstantial than musical. That was an album that took us a very, very long time to make. ... So it’s not that I have anything against the songs, it’s just when I think of making that album it wasn’t a very pleasant experience. It seemed like a lot of hard work."

Citing creative differences, drummer Brendan O'Hare left the band after touring for the album.

== Album cover ==
Geffen's art department had offered to come up with an idea for the album's cover art. Blake: "So we said, "Sure, feel free. Obviously we’ll have to think about what you come up with, but send us some ideas." A few months later the band received "this image of a girl crying with mascara running in a white t-shirt with a 13 on it." The band, however, rejected the idea as they didn't feel it represented the music. "I think they were trying to market us to teenage girls", Blake said. "But we ended up having to pay them ten grand, because they got a photographer, a studio, and models. They had to pay them off." In the end, the band put together the sleeve themselves. Blake: "Jeff Koons did an art piece with a basketball suspended in water, which I liked the look of, so I thought I’d just rip that off because he does that with other people’s ideas."

== Reception ==
Professional ratings
Review scores
Source	Rating
AllMusic	4/5 stars
Chicago Tribune	2/4 stars
Entertainment Weekly	A−
Mojo	3/5 stars
NME	7/10
The Philadelphia Inquirer	3.5/4 stars
Pitchfork	7.2/10
Q	4/5 stars
Rolling Stone	3.5/5 stars
Uncut	7/10

At the time of release, Thirteen received mostly negative reviews. Music critic Robert Christgau gave it a "neither" rating, indicating that an album "may impress once or twice with consistent craft or an arresting track or two. Then it won't." Spin denounced Teenage Fanclub for making "a fetish of smothering emotion under a blanket of stoic formalism." Rolling Stone, however, called the album "even sweeter than its predecessor" and praised the band as "among the best recyclers [of power pop and bubblegum rock] around." Musician called it "great ear candy that we may one day learn is also nutritious."

Retrospective reviews have been generally positive. AllMusic called it "an eminently worthy follow-up to the classic Bandwagonesque" and Pitchfork wrote: "To this day, its reputation is far worse than the actual music."

== Track listing ==
No.	Title	Writer(s)	Length
1.	"Hang On"	Gerard Love	5:05
2.	"The Cabbage"	Norman Blake	2:56
3.	"Radio"	Love	2:56
4.	"Norman 3"	Blake	4:36
5.	"Song to the Cynic"	Love	3:36
6.	"120 Mins"	Raymond McGinley	3:07
7.	"Escher"	McGinley	3:19
8.	"Commercial Alternative"	Blake	2:40
9.	"Fear of Flying"	Love	5:25
10.	"Tears Are Cool"	McGinley	3:48
11.	"Ret Liv Dead"	Blake	2:09
12.	"Get Funky"	Brendan O'Hare	1:22
13.	"Gene Clark"	Love	6:38
Total length:			47:41

US and Japanese edition bonus tracks
No.	Title	Writer(s)	Length
14.	"Genius Envy" (B-side from "Norman 3")	McGinley	3:05
15.	"Don's Gone Columbia" (B-side from "Radio")	O'Hare	1:35
16.	"Chords of Fame" (B-side from "Radio") (Phil Ochs cover)	Phil Ochs	3:40
17.	"Weird Horses" (B-side from "Radio")	McGinley	4:30
18.	"Golden Glades" (B-side from "Norman 3")	O'Hare	4:35
19.	"Older Guys" (B-side from "Norman 3") (The Flying Burrito Brothers cover)	Gram Parsons, Chris Hillman, Bernie Leadon	2:40
Total length:			69:25

Limited edition bonus disc
No.	Title	Writer(s)	Length
1.	"Goody Goody Gumdrops" (radio session) (1910 Fruitgum Company cover)	Jeffry Katz, Jerry Kasenetz, Reid Whitelaw, Billy Carl	2:50
2.	"Radio" (radio session)	Love	2:58
3.	"It's So Hard to Fall in Love (Note: Titled "It's So Hard to Fall in Love" in its original version by Sebadoh.)" (radio session) (Sebadoh cover)	Lou Barlow	2:07
4.	"Gene Clarke" (radio session)	Love	5:35
Total length:			13:30

Note

- The four tracks on the limited edition bonus disc were recorded in June 1993 for BBC Radio 1's The Evening Session.

== Personnel ==
Teenage Fanclub

- Norman Blake – vocals, guitar
- Gerard Love – vocals, bass
- Raymond McGinley – vocals, guitar
- Brendan O'Hare – drums

Additional musicians

- Iain MacDonald – flute (1)
- John McCusker – violin (1)
- Mike Hare – slide guitar (2)
- Joe McAlinden – violin (2, 7, 10), alto saxophone (8)

Technical

- Teenage Fanclub – producer
- Andy MacPherson – producer, engineer
- Darrin Tidsey – assistant engineer
- Andy Lee – assistant engineer
- Tony Doogan – assistant engineer
- Duncan Cameron – assistant engineer
- Paul Chisholm – assistant engineer
- Tim Young – mastering engineer
- Brian Spanklen – cover photography
- Dennis Keeley – band photography
- Mark Bown – sleeve layout

== Charts ==
Chart (1993)	Peak position
Swedish Albums (Sverigetopplistan)	43
UK Albums (OCC)	14
US Heatseekers Albums (Billboard)	19

Chart (2018)	Peak position
Scottish Albums (OCC)	23
