= Brendan O'Hare =

Scottish musician

- Born: 16 January 1970 (age 56)
- Origin: Cambuslang, Lanarkshire, Scotland
- Occupations: Musician; engineer; songwriter
- Instruments: Drums; guitar; keyboards
- Years active: 1989-present
- Formerly of: Mogwai; Teenage Fanclub; Telstar Ponies

Brendan O'Hare (born 16 January 1970) is a Scottish musician, primarily known for being the drummer in the rock band Teenage Fanclub from 1989 until early 1994, and a member of and collaborator with Mogwai.

== Career ==
O'Hare was brought up in Cambuslang, South Lanarkshire and studied at St Aloysius' College, Glasgow. He joined Teenage Fanclub in 1989, playing drums on several songs on their debut album, A Catholic Education. He co-wrote with Teenage Fanclub on all albums during his tenure, but split from the group after completing the tour for the Thirteen album, citing musical differences. at the time and went on to join Telstar Ponies, for which he worked on two albums.

He was an early member of Mogwai for approximately a year, playing on Mogwai's debut album, Young Team. A description of O'Hare by the NME as Teenage Fanclub's "Monkey Without Portfolio", for his humour and upbeat personality prompted the track "With Portfolio" on Young Team.

Between 1996 and 2005, O'Hare played guitar and sang with self-proclaimed 'Intelli-metal' band, Macrocosmica. Macrocosmica's releases on the God Bless label were rereleased in 2021 on the God Bless Macrocosmica compilation. O'Hare is also an honorary member and producer of Glasgow-based pranksters The Plimptons, and plays guitar on their second album Pomp.

Between 1997 and 1998, O'Hare released a trilogy of experimental ambient albums under the name of Fiend. These albums featured recordings involving other members of Telstar Ponies (predominantly Gavin Laird), of whom he was still a member when the material was recorded.

O'Hare featured on Arab Strap's double A-side 1998 release, "Here We Go"/"Trippy", contributing to the twelve-minute song, "Trippy".

In 2006 and in 2018, he rejoined Teenage Fanclub for a tour in which the band played their Bandwagonesque album in its entirety as well as the Creation Years tour.

== Discography ==
=== Albums ===
- Ad Astra, with Macrocosmica (1997) – God Bless Records
- Caledonian Gothic, as Fiend (1997) – God Bless Records
- Caledonian Cosmic, as Fiend (1998) – God Bless Records
- Caledonian Mystic, as Fiend (1998) – God Bless Records
- Art of the Black Earth, with Macrocosmica (2003)
- Farewell To Earth, with Macrocosmica (2005)

=== EPs ===
- "Space Geek", with Macrocosmica (1998) – God Bless Records

== Awards ==
O'Hare was awarded Live Sound Engineer of the Year at the Scottish New Music Awards in 2011.
