= Teenage Fanclub =

Scottish alternative rock band

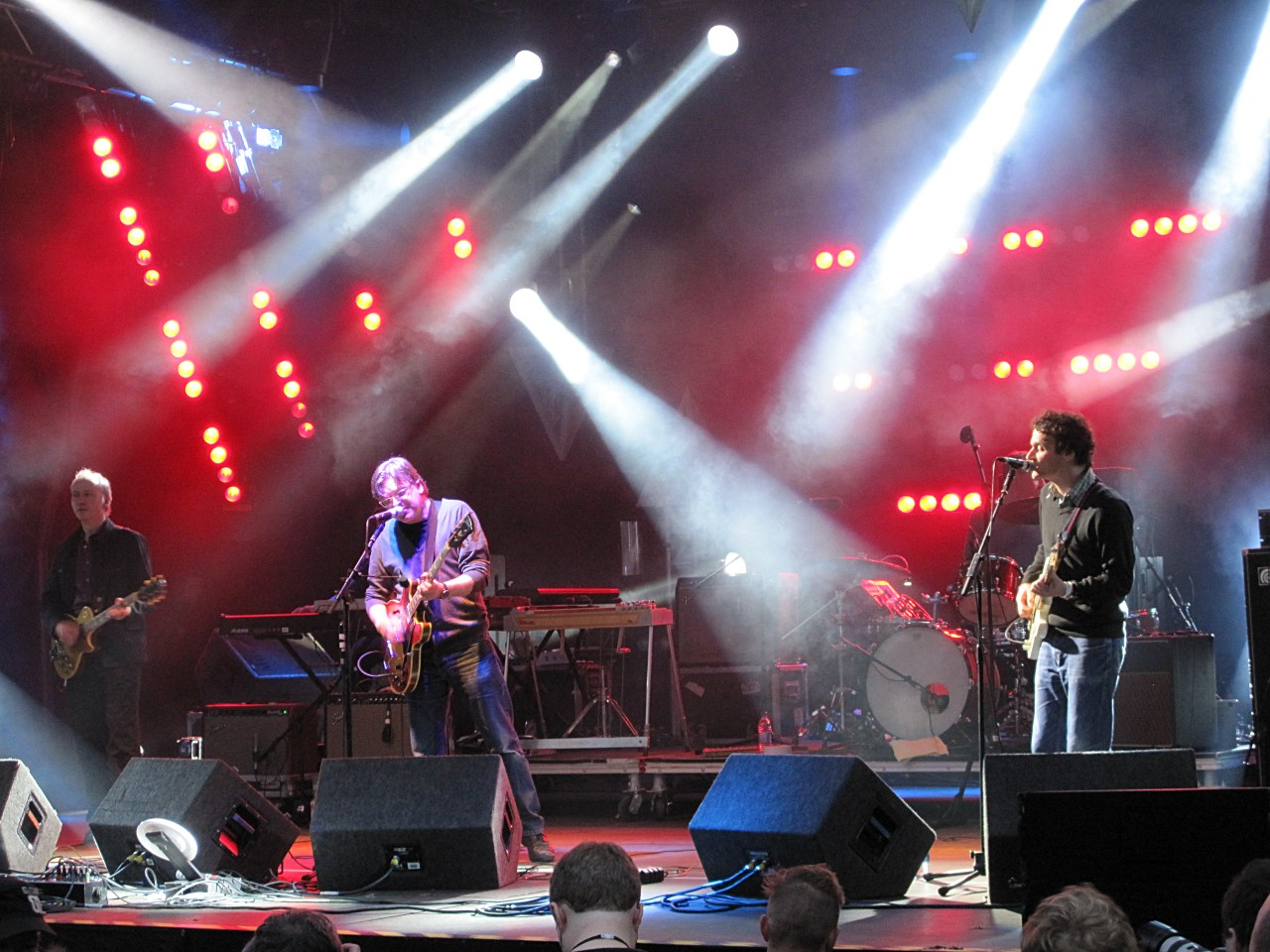
- Teenage Fanclub live in 2010 (Summer Sundae festival, Leicester)

Background information
- Origin: Glasgow, Scotland
- Genres: Alternative rock; power pop; indie rock; indie pop; jangle pop; noise pop
- Years active: 1989–present
- Labels: Paperhouse; Creation; Columbia; PeMa; Matador; DGC
- Members: Norman Blake; Raymond McGinley; Francis MacDonald; Dave McGowan; Euros Childs
- Past members: Brendan O'Hare; Paul Quinn; Finlay MacDonald; Gerard Love
- Website: www.teenagefanclub.com

Teenage Fanclub are a Scottish alternative rock band formed in Glasgow in 1989. The group was founded by Norman Blake (vocals, guitar), Raymond McGinley (vocals, lead guitar) and Gerard Love (vocals, bass), all of whom shared lead vocals and songwriting duties until Love's departure in 2018. As of 2023, the band's lineup consists of Blake, McGinley, longtime drummer Francis MacDonald, Dave McGowan (bass, vocals) and Euros Childs (keyboards, vocals).

In concert, the band usually alternate among its songwriters, giving equal playing time to each one's songs. Although often classified as alternative rock, the group have incorporated a wide variety of elements from various music styles.

Teenage Fanclub have had a succession of drummers, namely Francis MacDonald, Brendan O'Hare and Paul Quinn. Keyboardist Finlay MacDonald (no relation to Francis) has also been a member. As of 2026, the band have released 13 studio albums and two compilation albums.

== History ==
=== 1989–1991: Formation, A Catholic Education and The King ===
Teenage Fanclub emerged from the Glasgow C86 scene. They formed following the break-up of the Boy Hairdressers, a band featuring Raymond McGinley, Norman Blake and Francis MacDonald. Following a brief period in which Blake was a member of BMX Bandits, the three former bandmates joined with Gerard Love to form Teenage Fanclub.

Originally a noisy and chaotic band, their first album A Catholic Education, released in 1990 on Paperhouse, is largely atypical of their later sound, with the possible exception of "Everything Flows". Mostly written by Blake and McGinley, the record included several songs originally intended for the Boy Hairdressers. After recording his drum parts, MacDonald left the band to resume his university studies. They re-recorded several songs with MacDonald's replacement, Brendan O'Hare, because they weren't satisfied with the results of the original recording sessions, and because they wanted to involve O'Hare in the album.

The band followed the album with the EP God Knows It's True before being signed by Creation Records. The King, their next album, was a semi-improvised collection recorded in a single day. Originally intended to be a very limited release, the record received reviews critical of its self-confessed shambolic guitar thrash; it also included a cover of Madonna's "Like a Virgin".

=== 1991–1993: Bandwagonesque and Thirteen ===
Their next album, Bandwagonesque, released on Creation Records in the UK and Geffen in the US, brought Teenage Fanclub a measure of commercial success. Bandwagonesque was more deliberately constructed, and introduced the band's signature sound, with its immediate hooks and fuzzy, controlled guitar riffs. In addition, the record's producer, Don Fleming, encouraged the group to develop their penchant for vocal harmonies: this likewise would become a trademark element of their sound. Bandwagonesque also signalled the band's adoption of a more collaborative songwriting ethos: each member of the band supplied songs, with solo writing credits equally split between Love and Blake, McGinley contributing "I Don't Know" alongside his playing on the others' songs, and O'Hare supplying lead vocals on "Sidewinder", a track co-written with Love.

Acclaimed upon release, Bandwagonesque spawned the singles "Star Sign", "The Concept", and "What You Do to Me", the latter reaching #31 in the UK charts; the three accompanying music videos also achieved airplay on MTV, bolstering the band's reputation across the Atlantic. Bandwagonesque topped Spin magazine's 1991 end-of-year poll for best album, beating Nirvana's Nevermind, their Creation stablemates My Bloody Valentine's album Loveless, and R.E.M.'s Out of Time.

Their followup album, 1993's self-produced Thirteen, received mixed reviews on release, although it has since seen some critical reappraisal. Some reviews criticised the record for a perceived failure to develop the band's sound, despite experiments in instrumentation (strings and flute on single "Hang On", mandolin on "120 Mins"), while some tracks — like "Norman 3", another of the singles pulled from the album — feature lengthy outros that some critics deemed overly repetitive. However, lead single "Radio" did chart at #31 in the UK, matching the position achieved by What You Do to Me.

=== 1994–1999: Grand Prix and Songs from Northern Britain ===
After touring Thirteen, Teenage Fanclub parted ways with Brendan O'Hare, citing "musical differences". His replacement was Paul Quinn, formerly of the Soup Dragons. With Quinn on board, and David Bianco producing, the band began work on Grand Prix, their fifth album. This record would see Teenage Fanclub take their signature sound in a more polished direction: the songs boasted a cleaner power pop feel than those on the self-produced Thirteen. An acoustic ballad, "Mellow Doubt", was selected as the album's lead single, while upbeat follow-ups "Sparky's Dream" and "Neil Jung" combined pop melodies with jagged guitar.

Grand Prix was both a critical and commercial success in the UK, becoming their first top ten album. In the US however the band failed to regain the ground that Thirteen had lost them. Around this time Liam Gallagher of labelmates Oasis called the band "the second best band in the world" – second only to Oasis.

Songs from Northern Britain followed Grand Prix and built on the former's success. It became their highest-charting release in the UK and contained their biggest hit single to date, "Ain't That Enough".

=== 2000–2005: Howdy!, Words of Wisdom and Hope and Man-Made ===
The follow-up album, Howdy!, released on Columbia Records in the UK after the demise of Creation, continued the sound of Songs from Northern Britain. Francis MacDonald rejoined as the drummer in place of Quinn, who left the band after recording his parts for Howdy! and before its release due to personal difficulties within the band . Quinn went on to form the Primary 5.

In 2002, they released Words of Wisdom and Hope with Jad Fair of Half Japanese.

Their final release on a Sony label, Four Thousand Seven Hundred and Sixty-Six Seconds – A Short Cut to Teenage Fanclub, collected the band's best songs along with three new songs (one from each member).

Their next album, Man-Made, was released on 2 May 2005, on the band's own PeMa label. Man-Made was recorded in Chicago in 2004, and produced by John McEntire of Tortoise.

In 2006, the band held two special concerts (in London and Glasgow) playing their 1991 album Bandwagonesque in its entirety.

=== 2008–2018: Shadows, Here and Love's departure ===
The band began work on their ninth album in August 2008, booking an initial three weeks at Leeders Farm recording studio in Norfolk. The album was called Shadows, the first to involve keyboardist Dave McGowan as a full-time member, and was released on the band's own PeMa label. It became available in Europe, Australasia and Japan on 31 May 2010, and was released by Merge Records in North America on 8 June 2010.

In May 2015, Teenage Fanclub supported the Foo Fighters at a concert at Old Trafford Cricket Ground.

Their tenth album, Here, was released on 9 September 2016.

The story of Teenage Fanclub's early days features in the 2017 documentary Teenage Superstars.

In August 2018, the band issued new versions of their five Creation Records era albums which had been remastered at Abbey Road Studios. To celebrate the reissues, the band also announced Songs from Teenage Fanclub: The Creation Records Years, a four-city UK tour during late October to mid-November in which they would play three nights each in Glasgow, Manchester, Birmingham and London, with each night's setlist covering different periods of the Creation-era discography, and featuring former drummers Brendan O'Hare and Paul Quinn participating, in which both drummers would respectively perform the albums and B-sides they had originally recorded. These gigs would be Gerard Love's last with the group, as he separated from the band due to differences in opinion on their future touring plans, later revealed to be a reluctance to fly frequently around the world for live performances.

=== 2019–2025: Arrival of Euros Childs, Endless Arcade and Nothing Lasts Forever ===
After Love's departure, Euros Childs joined the band on keyboards and vocals, with Dave McGowan switching over to bass and vocals. A new album with this line-up, titled Endless Arcade, was recorded in early and late 2019. It was originally planned for release in October 2020 to coincide with a UK and Europe tour the following November and December. However, the tour was rescheduled for April and May 2021 due to the COVID-19 pandemic, and the album's release date would eventually be set for 5 March 2021. The album release date and tour would end up being rescheduled once again, with Endless Arcade coming out on 30 April 2021 and the tour dates postponed to September 2021 and April and May 2022.

On September 22, 2023, the band released its twelfth studio album, Nothing Lasts Forever, which placed highly on albums-of-the-year lists from music magazines, Mojo and Uncut.

=== 2026–present: Do Not Dare to Dream ===
On October 9, 2026, the band released its thirteenth studio album, Do Not Dare to Dream, on Merge Records. It was recorded at Black Bay Studio on the remote Scottish island of Great Bernera in the Outer Hebrides.

== Other projects ==
Blake formed the two-person band Jonny with Childs. In 2012, Blake also formed a Canadian-based supergroup with Joe Pernice and Mike Belitsky called the New Mendicants. In 2022, Blake played a one-off acoustic concert with Bernard Butler and James Grant during Celtic Connections playing songs from all three of their catalogues. They have since continued to tour together and released an eponymous album of new songs in 2025.

McGinley joined McGowan's folk group Snowgoose, whose debut album Harmony Springs was released in 2012.

After playing bass on Jonny's 2011 eponymous debut album, McGowan became Belle and Sebastian's touring bassist in 2011, and appeared on their 2015 album Girls in Peacetime Want to Dance. On 3 November 2018, he became an official member of the band.

Love released his solo album Electric Cables in 2012 using the alias Lightships. The album also featured instrumental contributions from McGowan and O'Hare.

Francis MacDonald released an album of minimalist classical music, Music for String Quartet, Piano & Celeste, in 2015. MacDonald played piano and celeste, with strings by members of the Scottish Ensemble.

Quinn released three self composed albums: North Pole on his own Bellbeat Music label; Go! on Re-Action Recordings, and High Five. Quinn released a digital only release of demos before deciding to call time on the Primary 5.

== Musical style and legacy ==
Their sound is reminiscent of Californian bands like the Beach Boys and the Byrds. Teenage Fanclub are influenced by Big Star and Orange Juice. They performed a cover of Orange Juice's "Rip It Up" with Edwyn Collins. In December 2010, at the ATP Bowlie 2 music festival, they performed as the backing band for Collins.

Their musical style has been described as alternative rock, power pop, indie rock, indie pop, jangle pop, noise pop, pop-punk, and grunge (early).

Teenage Fanclub were regularly name-checked in interviews by Kurt Cobain, who described them as "the best band in the world". The band supported Nirvana on tour in the summer of 1992. Mark Morriss of the Bluetones covered the song "Alcoholiday" on his debut 2008 solo album, Memory Muscle and Juliana Hatfield covered the song "Cells" on her 2012 self-titled album.

In 2017, Ben Gibbard of the band Death Cab for Cutie covered their album Bandwagonesque in its entirety, as a tribute to the band and its successful 1991 release.

== Members ==
=== Current members ===
- Norman Blake – guitar, lead vocals (1989–present)
- Raymond McGinley – guitar, lead vocals (1989–present)
- Francis MacDonald – drums (1989, 2000–present), backing vocals (2000–present)
- Dave McGowan – bass, backing vocals (2019–present), keyboards, programming, guitar (2004–2018)
- Euros Childs – keyboards, programming, backing vocals (2019–present)

=== Former members ===
- Gerard Love – bass, lead vocals (1989–2018)
- Brendan O'Hare – drums, backing vocals (1989–1994, 2018 live shows)
- Paul Quinn – drums (1994–2000, 2018 live shows)
- Finlay MacDonald – keyboards, programming, guitar, bass, backing vocals (1997–2001)

== Discography ==
Studio albums

- A Catholic Education (1990)
- The King (1991)
- Bandwagonesque (1991)
- Thirteen (1993)
- Grand Prix (1995)
- Songs from Northern Britain (1997)
- Howdy! (2000)
- Words of Wisdom and Hope (with Jad Fair) (2002)
- Man-Made (2005)
- Shadows (2010)
- Here (2016)
- Endless Arcade (2021)
- Nothing Lasts Forever (2023)
- Do Not Dare to Dream (2026)
