= Francis MacDonald =

Scottish musician and manager (born 1970)

Francis Macdonald (born 11 September 1970) is a Scottish drummer, composer, and manager. He is the drummer with Teenage Fanclub, and the manager of Camera Obscura and the Vaselines. He also composes music for film and television, and released an album of minimalist classical music in 2015.

== Career ==
Macdonald recorded a solo album called Sauchiehall & Hope – A Pop Opera under the pseudonym "Nice Man" and The Art of Hanging Out as "Nice Man and the Bad Boys". In 2011, he recorded two digital albums of instrumental music: Maculate Conceptions and Maculate Conceptions Volume 2 on GarageBand on his personal computer during a Teenage Fanclub tour of Europe.

On 30 March 2015, he released Music For String Quartet, Piano And Celeste. The album was recorded at Mogwai's Castle of Doom Studios in Glasgow and features a quartet from the Scottish Ensemble. It was described by Classic FM as "sublime, minimalist classical music". The album debuted at number 12 in the Classical Artist Albums Chart and at number 3 in the Specialist Classical Albums Chart.

Macdonald runs Shoeshine Records / Spit & Polish in Glasgow. He has co-produced albums by Aaron Wright, Attic Lights and Aaron Fyfe.
