= Norman Blake (Scottish musician) =

Scottish singer, songwriter and musician

- Blake performing in 2003

Background information
- Born: 20 October 1965 (age 61); Bothwell, Lanarkshire, Scotland
- Origin: Glasgow, Scotland
- Instruments: Vocals, guitar, keyboards, bass, drums
- Member of: Teenage Fanclub
- Formerly of: The Pretty Flowers

Norman George Blake (born 20 October 1965) is a Scottish singer, instrumentalist and songwriter who is best known as the lead singer of Teenage Fanclub.

== Early life ==
Blake was born in Bothwell, Lanarkshire on October 20, 1965.

== Career ==
Blake and Sean Dickson (the Soup Dragons) were in the Faith Healers together, which also contained various members at different times: Stevie Gray, Hugh McLaughlin, Brian Carson and Colin Murray to name but a few.

Blake was a member of Glasgow group the Pretty Flowers with school friend Duglas T. Stewart, Frances McKee, Janice Cochrane and Sean Dickson. After the group split, Blake formed the Boy Hairdressers in 1986, assisted in the original lineup by Dickson and Stewart. Later Blake was joined by Joe McAlinden, Jim Lambie and three future members of Teenage Fanclub, Raymond McGinley, Francis Macdonald and Paul Quinn (after Macdonald's departure; Brendan O’ Hare also joined the group at this time). The group recorded one EP for 53rd and 3rd Records featuring three of Blake's compositions.

In 1986, Blake also joined BMX Bandits, originally on drums, later moving to guitar. He became a key songwriter for them, co-authoring some of their best-loved material including "Disco Girl", "Serious Drugs" and "Right Across the Street". Blake also joined Glasgow group the Clouds for a short stay, playing lead guitar on their single Get Out of My Dream. In 1989 he formed Teenage Fanclub with McGinley, later enlisting Francis Macdonald and Gerard Love to record their debut A Catholic Education. The album was primarily composed by Blake and included the anthemic "Everything Flows" (later covered by acts including Velvet Crush, Dinosaur Jr, Idlewild and Gallygows). The album was recorded in Glasgow back-to-back with the debut album of Blake's other group at that time, BMX Bandits, the ironically titled C86, which Blake also wrote much of the material for.

Blake officially left the Bandits in 1991 after their Star Wars album but continues to be an occasional contributor to their records. He has found international fame and acclaim with Teenage Fanclub for his songwriting talents and vocal abilities in both lead and harmony roles. Blake's songs reflect an appreciation and understanding of many musical genres, and his Teenage Fanclub songs include "Straight and Narrow", "Alcoholiday", "Did I Say" and "Neil Jung".

Blake has continued to contribute to projects without his main band, including one-off collaborations with Eugene Kelly as the Famous Monsters, and Francis MacDonald as Frank Blake. More recently, he has recorded and co-written material with Euros Childs, forming the indie superduo Jonny. Blake has also appeared on recordings by the Trash Can Sinatras, the Pastels, Kevin Ayers, Bill Wells, the Reindeer Section, Snowgoose, Yeon Gene and the Pearlfishers. Blake has produced recordings for Speedboat (featuring Finlay MacDonald), the Pearlfishers and 1990s. He has solo recordings on the albums Caroline Now! (a tribute album to the Beach Boys) and Ballads of the Book.

In 2001, Blake stood down from being elected Rector of the University of Glasgow to make room for his friend, Belle and Sebastian's Stuart Murdoch.

In 2009, Blake moved with his Canadian wife to live in Kitchener, Ontario. He is currently collaborating with Joe Pernice in the New Mendicants. Their debut album, Into the Lime, was released in January 2014.

In 2014, Blake released How Many Glasgow, an album in collaboration with Jad Fair and Tenniscoats on the label Sweet Dreams Press. 2015 saw the release of the album Yes, a collaboration with Jad Fair as part of Fair's artist in residence project with Indianapolis label Joyful Noise Recordings.

In 2018, Blake produced the debut (and only) album, Things That Roar, by Manchester band the Beep Seals. The band was fronted by former Alfie guitarist, Ian Smith, and Jack Cooper, who went on to form several bands including Ultimate Painting and Mazes.

Blake features prominently in the 2017 documentary Teenage Superstars.

After performing together in 2022, Blake, Suede guitarist Bernard Butler and Love and Money's James Grant released, as a trio, their debut album Butler, Blake & Grant, in March 2025 through 355 Recordings.
