= Tartan Features =

Scottish film distributor

Tartan Features is a filmmaking network and distribution platform based in Scotland. It supports the production of micro-budget feature films.

== Origin ==
Tartan Features was established in 2013.

Its name is in reference to the defunct "Tartan Shorts" filmmaking strand run by the Scottish Screen Production Fund (later Scottish Screen) and BBC Scotland.

In February 2014, Tartan Features made their first venture into do-it-yourself cinema distribution. Their first feature, Sarah's Room (then titled To Here Knows When) was screened at the Edinburgh Filmhouse Cinema via a collaboration with the independent short film night, Write-Shoot-Cut. This was the first opportunity in Scotland for independent filmmakers to have their micro-budget feature films to be screened regularly in a cinema. Sarah's Room was followed by three other Tartan Features Write-Shoot-Cut collaborations during 2014: Skeletons, Take It Back and Start All Over Again and A Practical Guide to a Spectacular Suicide.

== History ==
Tartan Features is a strand of a DIY Filmmaking initiative called Year Zero Filmmaking which also includes distribution, filmmaking events, and a film festival. It was started by Grant McPhee and Neil Rolland.

Various filmmakers and creatives have been involved throughout its existence including Lauren Lamaar, John McPhail, Grant McPhee, Neil Rolland, Graham Hughes, Olivia Gifford, Alison Piper and journalist Neil Cooper.

The origins of Tartan Features can be traced back to the 2008 Glasgow Bootleg Film Festival, a then unusual "maverick alternative" to traditional festivals where films were screened at "pop-up" screenings in atypical settings, such as coffee shops and unused spaces and on lo-fi equipment.

In 2013 the Bootleg Film Festival teamed up with the Edinburgh local independent film screening night, Write, Shoot, Cut. Tartan Features was born from a further collaboration to develop a platform to create and screen locally produced micro-budget feature films. It was set up as a reaction to the lack of micro budget feature films by Creative Scotland (now Screen Scotland) such as England’s Micro-Wave.

Glasgow Fringe Film Festival was set-up in acknowledgment of what the Fringe Festival was to the Edinburgh International Festival due to the belief that there were not enough opportunities for highlighting local filmmaking talents at the two large Scottish film festivals – Edinburgh International Film Festival and Glasgow Film Festival.

== Ethos ==
The ethos, influenced by the independent record industry is to advocate DIY methods and combine that with professional filmmaking processes; to act as a bridge between grassroots filmmaking and lift the lid on how the filmmaking industry works. This often includes creating guides for self sufficiency based on classic DIY music manifestos such as The KLF’s "How to Have a Number One the Easy Way" and Scritti Politti’s "How to Make a Record."

“Our biggest desire is to not make a series of financially lucrative genre films. Someone else can – and will do. We just want to lift the curtain on the film industry by showing things can be done differently.

We’re delighted that people make films through us and go on to have great success after. That’s all part of what we’re trying to do. We don’t want to become part of the current industry, we want to show there’s a clear alternative, or be a temporary bridge to help you get there.

Festivals and Cinemas – and the films you make are part of a shared culture. They get reflected back at us all to become an even greater part of how we operate in our daily lives. Don’t waste your talent and time pandering to a broken system. If you want to tell a story and someone is suggesting you tell it another way remember Spiral Scratch. If you feel nobody’s listening there’s a clear alternative to do something on your own terms.”

== Films ==
The Tartan Features roster of films are numbered in the style of the independent record labels from which they take inspiration.

A number of films under the Tartan Features banner have reached critical acclaim, including Big Gold Dream, receiving warm reviews and plaudits in end-of-year lists and the award-winning Where Do We Go From Here?

Film No.	Film name
1	Sarah's Room
2	Take It Back and Start All Over Again
3	Wigilia
4	Skeletons
5	Where Do We Go From Here?
6	Big Gold Dream
7	Bend Don't Break
8	Night Kaleidoscope
9	Con Men
10	The Crews
11	Teenage Superstars
12	Benchmark 6
13	A Practical Guide to a Spectacular Suicide
14	Far From the Apple Tree
15	Lori and the Six Six Sixties
16	Darkness Comes
17	Ribbons
18	Death of a Vlogger
19	Connect
20	Blood's A Rover
21	Poxy Pop Groups
22	The Revolutionary Spirit

== Eventography ==
Over the years Tartan Features has set up and marketed their own Tartan Features events.

- TFE 1 – Write Shoot Cut / Tartan Features - Sarah's Room - Feb 2014
- TFE 2 – Tartan Features 'Introduction to Micro Budget Filmmaking Networking' Event – Filmhouse Sept – 2014
- TFE 3 – Write Shoot Cut / Tartan Features – 'TF4 Skeletons' Screening at Filmhouse – November 2014
- TFE 4 – Write Shoot Cut / Tartan Features – 'TF2 Take it Back and Start all Over Again' Screening at Filmhouse - Feb 2015.
- TFE 5 – Tartan Features Filmmaking Event – CCA – 'Take it Back and Start All Over Again' - March 2015
- TFE 6 – TF Takes over EIFF – TF6 Big Gold Dream Premiere and Big Gold Gig – 2015
- TFE 7 – TF Takes over GFF – 'TF5 – Where Do We Go From Here' Screening at GFT/GFF 2016
- TFE 8 – Micro Budget and DIY Film Festival – Govanhill Baths 2016
- TFE 9 – TF 3 - Wigilia Screening/BMX Bandits and TF Xmas Party – Gmac and Wigilia Night – 2016
- TF10 – TF v BBC – Big Gold Dream UK TV Premiere - 2017
- TF11 – TF v EIFF – Teenage Superstars Premiere at EIFF and Duglas T Stewart/Eugene Kelly Aftershow - June 2017
- TF12 – Tartan Features at Scottish Parliament
- TF13 – Beyond Year Zero –/ Glasgow Fringe Film Festival

== Discography ==
Year Zero also has an independent record label strand to release music associated with the film releases.

Album title	Artist	Format	Year
Sarah's Room EP	Wounded Knee, Alec Cheer	7", EP, Single	2017
Night Kaleidoscope Title	Alec Cheer	7", Single	2017
Wigilia / Agata's Song	Duglas T. Stewart / Norman Blake	7", S/Sided, Single	2017
Night Kaleidoscope Soundtrack	Alec Cheer	CD, Album	2017
Sarah's Room Soundtrack	Wounded Knee	Cass, S/Sided	2017
Big Gold Dream	Various	DVD-V, Reg	2017
Horrowshow	Scars	DVD-V, Ltd, Promo	2017
Jowe Head And The Teenage Filmstars : Featuring Duglas T Stewart And Rose McDowall	Jowe Head	(DVD	2018
Teenage Superstars: The Sound of Young Scotland	Various	DVD-V, Reg	2019

== Reception ==
Many of the films which fall under the Tartan Features umbrella, or the filmmakers themselves, have received wider recognition.

=== Bend Don't Break ===
Bend Don't Break led to director Alex Harron receiving a BBC commission for his next two films - The Racer and The Boxer.

=== Big Gold Dream ===
Big Gold Dream premiered at the Edinburgh International Film Festival on 19 June 2015 where it won the Audience Award. It was voted 131 in Sight and Sounds Best Films of 2015 Poll A self distributed DVD released through Rough Trade and Love Music appeared in 2017. A BBC 2 Screening led to a large amount of positive press in newspapers and online articles including Vice, Dazed and Pitchfork.

In May 2016 Big Gold Dream screened at a special event at New York University, Rough Trade NYC and The NYC Pop-Fest. For the occasion a commemorative cassette and limited edition screen-printed poster were created by Texte Und Tone. The cassette notes were an extended conversation between Michael Train and Michael Vazquez, who had programmed a continuous 96 hour broadcast of Scottish underground music during 1994, in Massachusetts.

Cherry Red Records released a 5-CD Box Set, entitled Big Gold Dreams that acted as a tie in with the film.

In October 2018 it was part of the National Museum of Scotland's 2018 Rip it Up exhibition where it screened at Edinburgh's Filmhouse.

=== Con Men ===
Director R Paul Wilson's seconds feature was screened at the 2017 Raindance Film Festival and was nominated for a British Independent Film Award.

=== Connect ===
Marilyn Edmond's directorial debut premiered at the 2019 Glasgow Film Festival It was also selected to play at The Orlando Film Festival, Film Focus Festival and The Sydney Indie Film Festival where it picked up several nominations (Best Film, Best Drama Film, Best Male lead & Best Female Lead) and saw Marilyn Edmond win Best Director.

The film had a successful local cinema run throughout Scotland with screenings at the Dundee Contemporary Arts Centre, The GFT, Grosvenor Cinema, The Scotsman Picturehouse and more.

Eddie Harrison of Film Authority rated the film with 4 stars stating, “Connect is a simple and effective drama that shines a light on a subject that most films avoid or exploit; hopefully it’ll gain a following by offering a fresh take on a universally mis-understood subject that needs tackled today.”

The film also received some well deserved publicity from publications eager to shine a light on the movies theme of male suicide from newspapers such as The Times, and the Daily Record

Marilyn Edmond's debut saw her catapulted onto Bafta's radar where she took part in a career Close-up Q&A Session

Available to watch on Amazon Prime

=== Death of a Vlogger ===
Death of a Vlogger, the 2019 horror/mystery and found footage film, written and directed by Graham Hughes received its premiere at the 2019 London FrightFest Film Festival. Followed closely by screening at the 2020 Glasgow Film Festival.

The film received positive reviews from Slashfilm and Starburst Magazine.

Andrew Marshall of Starburst Magazine wrote: “Death of a Vlogger is a sinister and compelling tale of how perception affects the nature of an observed reality, and an example of just how gripping a moviegoing experience can be crafted out of a simple idea with enough creativity and imagination.”

Rafael of slashfilm.com rated this film a 9/10 stating, "A twisted story of warped perceptions, megalomania, the victims in the middle of media manipulation and our own obsession with online cruelty that results in a breath of fresh air in an overcrowded genre"

The film is now available on Amazon Prime.

=== Far From the Apple Tree ===
Far From the Apple Tree, received its premiere at the 2019 Manchester Film Festival This was followed by a cinema run at the DCA in may of 2019

Lead actress, Sorcha Groundsell found international fame in the Netflix series, The Innocents.

Eye for Film gave the film 4.5/5 stating: "An excellent piece of work. No doubt some viewers will be turned off by its unwillingness to compromise for the sake of accessibility, but others will fall in love."

The film was also positively reviewed by Horrified Magazine and Warped Perspective.

DVD released by Redemption Films in the UK and Kino Lorber in the US. Vinyl Soundtrack by Rose McDowall and Shawn Pinchbeck released by Glass Modern Records

=== Night Kaleidoscope ===
Vinyl Soundtrack released by Trunk Records in 2019

DVD released by Redemption Films in the UK and Kino Lorber in the US

=== Teenage Superstars ===
Teenage Superstars received its Cinema Premiere in 2018 at the Glasgow Film Festival

Was part of the National Museum of Scotland's 2018 Rip it Up exhibition where it screened at Edinburgh's Filmhouse

Teenage Superstars has received generally positive reviews, including 4 out of 5 stars in both The List, and The Skinny with The Herald calling it "a real treat for music fans."

Having completed a successful festival run the documentary was picked up by Sky Arts receiving its television premiere on the 23 January 2021.

It was highly reviewed as pick of the day on The Guardian, The Observer, The Times & The Telegraph.

=== Where Do We Go From Here? ===
Where Do We Go From Here? premiered at the Sydney Indie Film Festival on 18 October 2015, where it was nominated for eight awards and won three, including 'Best Film'. It would screen and win more awards at festivals throughout the world before finally screening at the Glasgow Film Festival in 2016.

The international festival success led to John McPhail (director) being asked to direct the internationally successful feature, Anna and the Apocalypse, with producer Lauren Lamarr becoming its Associate Producer. In September 2018, Where Do We Go From Here embarked on an independently distributed two week cinema release at Cineworld (21 September - 4 October 2018)

John followed up Anna and the Apocalypse with short, film, Special Delivery, which was commissioned by 20th Digital Studio as part of a series of shorts for Halloween. Special Delivery was screened alongside nine other shorts across digital and broadcast platforms Freeform, FX, and Hulu’s Huluween platform hub and YouTube channel.

Off the back of Anna and The Apocalypse John has been announced as the director of Lady Macbeth, a YA Musical produced by Channing Tatum.
