= The Groovy Little Numbers =

- Origin: Bellshill, Scotland
- Genres: Indie pop
- Years active: mid to late 1980s
- Labels: 53rd & 3rd
- Past members: Joe McAlinden; Catherine Canning; Gerard Love; Jim 'Gas' Tierney

The Groovy Little Numbers were an indie pop band from Bellshill, Lanarkshire, Scotland centred on former member of The Boy Hairdressers, and future BMX Bandits and Superstar member Joe McAlinden.

== History ==
Formed in the mid-1980s, multi-instrumentalist Joe McAlinden was joined by Catherine Steven (vocals) and Gerard Love (bass, vocals), with a brass section from the Motherwell Youth Orchestra comprising Colette Walsh (tenor saxophone), John McRorie (alto sax), Kevin McCarthy (baritone sax), Mairi Cameron (trumpet), and James Wood (trumpet). The band only released two EPs during their time together, both on 53rd & 3rd, the first of which, "You Make My Head Explode", reached number 25 in the UK Indie Chart.

The band also contributed a track ('Get it Together') to the Honey at the Core (Part 2) compilation cassette.

The band split up, with McAlinden joining the BMX Bandits as guitarist in 1991. Love subsequently joined Teenage Fanclub.

McAlinden later formed a new band, Superstar, releasing five albums between 1992 and 2000, and later forming NOM with Sice from The Boo Radleys.

== Discography ==
=== EPs ===
- "You Made My Head Explode" (1988) 53rd & 3rd (UK Indie #25)
- "Happy Like Yesterday" (1988) 53rd & 3rd

=== Albums ===
- The 53rd & 3rd Singles (1998) Avalanche
