= Hungry Beat =

2022 book

- Author: Grant McPhee & Douglas McIntyre
- Language: English
- Genre: Music
- Publisher: White Rabbit Books
- Publication date: 15 September 2022
- Publication place: United Kingdom
- Media type: Print (hardback, audiobook)
- Pages: 565
- ISBN: 978-1-3996-0024-8

Hungry Beat is a 2022 book published by white Rabbit Books and written by Grant McPhee and Douglas MacIntyre with Neil Cooper. It is an oral history of Scotland's post-punk scene, focussing on the record labels Fast Product and Postcard Records. The introduction was written by Ian Rankin.

The interviews were primarily conducted for 2015 documentary Big Gold Dream, and later fleshed out to include new contributions.

The book featured as part of an event at the 2023 edition of the Celtic Connections festival.

== Reception ==
The book has been warmly received, garnering positive reviews from various critics.

Alistair Braidwood, reviewing the book for Snack magazine, wrote:

"It gives great insight into a time when Scottish independent music was so influential that the rest of the industry had to sit up and take notice."

Keith Cameron, reviewing for Mojo magazine, wrote:

"An epic, exhaustive work, Hungry Beat honours a cultural legacy which far transcends Scotland."

== Sequel ==
A sequel, titled Postcards from Scotland and written by McPhee, was published in 2024 by Omnibus Books. It covered Scotland’s independent music scene from 1983-1995. A third volume covering Glasgow’s 1980s and 1990s underground scene and featuring Franz Ferdinand, Mogwai, Bis, Belle and Sebastian and Arab Strap has been completed and will be released by Omnibus Books.
