= The Subway Organization =

British independent record label

- Founded: 1985
- Founder: Martin Whitehead
- Defunct: 1990
- Genre: Indie pop
- Country of origin: United Kingdom
- Location: Bristol
- Official website: subwayorg.co.uk

The Subway Organization was a British independent record label founded in 1985 in Bristol by Martin Whitehead.

== Indie pop and C86 ==
The label was associated with the indie pop movement and the seminal NME cassette tape C86, that included the track "It's Up To You" by Shop Assistants, from the label's first release (the group subsequently joined the 53rd & 3rd label). The label also had contacts with other groups including Pop Will Eat Itself but their songs were only released on compilations.

The founder of the label had his own group, The Flatmates.

== Singles artists ==
- Rodney Allen: Released the Happysad LP on his shemt in 1987, and 12-inch Circle Line EP in 1988. Then after a brief spell in The Chesterfields (replacing guitarist Brendan Holden), joined The Blue Aeroplanes.
- Bubblegum Splash!: Short lived (1987–1988) indie pop band from Salisbury, England. With Nikki Barr on vocals, Dave Todd on bass, Jim Harrison on guitar, Marty Cummins on tambourine and backing vocals, and Alan Harrison on drums. They recorded only 7 tracks in total, 4 of which were released on their debut and only EP "Splashdown!” in August 1987, which reached No. 15 in the indie charts. In December 1987 the track "If Only" came free on a split 7-inch flexidisc with The Darling Buds, in issue 2 of fanzine So Naive.
- The Charlottes:
- The Chesterfields: Indie rock band from Yeovil, Somerset (1984–1989). They garnered Indie Chart Hits for their singles and albums not only on The Subway Organisation, but their own Household label. Fans tended to refer to them as 'The Chesterf!elds', with an exclamation mark replacing the 'i', following the example of the band's logo.
- Choo Choo Train:
- The Clouds: Glasgow brothers John and Bill Charneley, who began as back-bedroom punks and gradually softened to an acoustic, West Coast-influenced sound after signing with The Subway Organization.
- The Fastbacks:
- The Flatmates: Indie pop band. The band's core members were Martin Whitehead (Guitar) and Debbie Haynes (Vocals). Initially, the band also included Kath Beach (Bass guitar) and Joel O'Beirne/Rocker (Drums). They released five singles, all of which featured in the UK Indie Chart Top 20.
- The Groove Farm:
- Korova Milk Bar:
- Razorcuts: Melodic UK guitar band with strong 60s folk-rock influences. The line-up consisted of Gregory Webster (vocals & guitar), Tim Vass (bass) and Dave Smith (drums). Vass later formed the psych/folkers Red Chair Fadeaway. Webster and Vass reunited under the name Forever People in 1992 for a one-off single on Bristol label Sarah Records.
- The Rosehips: Jangly UK pop band.
- Shop Assistants: Their All Day Long EP (SUBWAY 1) was the first release by the label in 1985. The track "It's Up to You" taken from the EP ended up on the C86 cassette tape from the NME.
- The Soup Dragons: The band formed in Bellshill, Glasgow in 1985 and recorded their first demo tape, You Have Some Too, after playing a few local gigs, and this was followed by a flexi disc single "If You Were the Only Girl in the World". Originally inspired by Buzzcocks and lumped in with the C86 movement, along with fellow members of the Bellshill Sound, such as the BMX Bandits and Teenage Fanclub, they went through a number of stylistic changes in their career. The band signed to Subway in early 1986 and their first proper single (The Sun in the Sky EP) was Buzzcocks-inspired pop-punk. The band's big breakthrough came with their second single for Subway, "Whole Wide World", which reached No. 2 on the UK Independent Chart in 1986.

== Compilations ==
- Take the Subway to Your Suburb, (suborg 1 [LP])
- Surfin' in the Subway, (suborg 4 [LP])

== Reissues on other labels ==
In 2005 Cherry Red released a CD of The Best of The Subway Organization 1986–1989.

== See also ==
- List of Record Labels from Bristol
- List of Bands from Bristol
- Culture of Bristol
- Bristol Archive Records
