= Black Tambourine =

American indie pop band

- Origin: Silver Spring, Maryland, U.S.
- Genres: Indie pop, noise pop, shoegaze, lo-fi
- Years active: 1989–1992, 2012
- Labels: Slumberland, Audrey's Diary
- Spinoffs: Velocity Girl, Lilys
- Past members: Pam Berry; Archie Moore; Brian Nelson; Mike Schulman

Black Tambourine was an American indie pop band and one of the earliest Slumberland groups of the early 1990s. Formed in Silver Spring, Maryland, the band comprised vocalist Pam Berry and instrumentalists Archie Moore, Brian Nelson and Mike Schulman. Along with Tiger Trap, Lois, Honeybunch, Tullycraft, and Beat Happening, they are considered to be one of the most influential bands of the American twee pop movement. Black Tambourine was described by Allmusic as one of the "seminal American indie pop bands of the 1980s."

== History ==
The members came to the project already acquainted with each other: Both Nelson (also of Big Jesus Trashcan) and Schulman were in Whorl together, while Schulman (also of Powderburns) co-founded Slumberland Records. Moore, meanwhile, was in Velocity Girl and played on early recordings by Lilys.

The band's influences include the June Brides, McCarthy, Jesse Garon and the Desperadoes, Pale Saints, Ride, Shop Assistants, the Pastels, Marine Girls, the Primitives, 14 Iced Bears, the Flatmates, Beat Happening, Galaxie 500, the Feelies, Yo La Tengo, the Jesus and Mary Chain, Phil Spector's Wall of Sound technique, the Wedding Present, Big Black, Head of David, Pussy Galore, the Birthday Party, the Velvet Underground, Love, and the Byrds. Mike Schulman has stated that "our other bands (Velocity Girl, Whorl) were noise bands who played pop songs, but Black Tambourine came at it the other way around."

Black Tambourine would eventually break up as Velocity Girl and Whorl took up increasingly more of the members' time. Berry went on to co-found the fanzine Chickfactor with Gail O'Hara in 1992. Due to demand for a reissue of their recordings, the band released Complete Recordings on CD and 10 in vinyl in 1999. In 2010, Black Tambourine released a self-titled compilation which included tracks from all their previous releases, as well as new recordings of four unreleased songs.

== Musical style and influences ==
Black Tambourine was influenced by the Wall of Sound methods of American record producer and murderer Phil Spector, as well as Scottish bands such as Jesus and Mary Chain and the Shop Assistants.

== Discography ==
=== EPs ===
- By Tomorrow 7-inch EP (1991, Slumberland Records)
- Throw Aggi Off the Bridge 7-inch EP (1992, Audrey's Diary)
- OneTwoThreeFour 7-inch EP (2012, Slumberland Records)
- Black Tambourine Cassette digital EP (2010, self-release)
- Black Tambourine cassette EP (2012, self-release)

=== Compilation albums ===
- Complete Recordings (1999, Slumberland Records)
- Black Tambourine (2010, Slumberland Records)

=== Compilation appearances ===
- "We Can't Be Friends" on One Last Kiss (1992, spinART)
- "Pam's Tan" on What Kind of Heaven Do You Want? 7-inch EP (1989, Slumberland)
