= Black Tambourine (disambiguation) =

Black Tambourine was an American pop band.

Black Tambourine may also refer to:

- Black Tambourine (album), a 2010 compilation album by Black Tambourine
- "Black Tambourine", a song by Withered Hand from New Gods
- "Black Tambourine", a song by Beck from Guero
