= 53rd & 3rd (record label) =

Scottish independent record label founded in 1985

- Founded: 1985
- Founder: Stephen Pastel, David Keegan, Sandy McLean
- Genre: Indie pop, C86
- Country of origin: Scotland
- Location: Edinburgh

53rd & 3rd was an influential Scottish independent record label founded in 1985 in Edinburgh by Stephen Pastel (of The Pastels), David Keegan (of Shop Assistants), and Sandy McLean. The label played a pivotal role in documenting the indie pop and C86 scenes of the mid-to-late 1980s.

== History ==
The label's name was a tribute to the Ramones song "53rd & 3rd". Its catalog numbers used the prefix "AGARR", standing for "As Good As Ramones Records".

The label's first release was the "Safety Net" single by Shop Assistants in 1985. 53rd & 3rd is also noted for releasing the debut work of The Vaselines, a band later cited by Kurt Cobain as his "favorite songwriters in the whole world" (Nirvana covered three of their songs: "Molly's Lips" and "Son of a Gun" on Incesticide, and "Jesus Doesn't Want Me for a Sunbeam" on MTV Unplugged in New York). The label became closely associated with the "shambling" sound and helped define the broader indiepop movement of the era.

== Chart Performance ==
Several 53rd & 3rd releases charted on the UK Independent Singles Chart. The label's highest-charting single was Shop Assistants' "Safety Net", which peaked at number two in 1986. Talulah Gosh placed multiple singles in the top five, with "Beatnik Boy" peaking at number three and "Steaming Train" at number four. The Vaselines' debut EP "Son of a Gun" reached number sixteen, while The Boy Hairdressers who would later evolve into Teenage Fanclub — charted at number twelve with "Golden Shower".

== Notable Artists ==
- The Pastels
- Shop Assistants
- Talulah Gosh
- The Vaselines
- BMX Bandits
- The Boy Hairdressers (later Teenage Fanclub)
- The Beat Poets

== Legacy ==
The label's output has been the subject of retrospective coverage in publications such as Record Collector and is featured in documentaries about the Scottish post-punk era, including Big Gold Dream (2013) and Teenage Superstars (2017), both by Grant McPhee.
