= Night Kaleidoscope =

- Directed by: Grant McPhee
- Written by: Chris Purnell; Megan Gretchen
- Produced by: Grant McPhee
- Starring: Patrick O'Brien; Mariel McAllan; Kitty Colquhoun; Jason Harvey; Craig-James Moncur; Robert Williamson; Gareth Morrison; Ashley Sutherland
- Cinematography: Grant McPhee
- Edited by: Ben McKinstrie
- Distributed by: Tartan Features
- Release date: February 4, 2017
- Running time: 83 minutes
- Country: Scotland
- Language: English

Night Kaleidoscope is a 2017 micro-budget psychedelic vampire horror directed by Grant McPhee. It follows psychic investigator, Fion (Patrick O’Brien), who has been hired by the local police to track down a pair of vampires responsible for a spate of murders.

== Plot ==
Fion is a gifted psychic, a trait passed down the generations from his father and grandfather. He is called to the scene of a murder by Pollock (Craig-James Moncur), a police officer who needs Fion's help in tracking down the vampire couple responsible - Carrie and Lewis (Kitty Colquhoun and Jason Harvey). Although accustomed to working by himself, Fion is approached by Isobel, the girlfriend of one of the victims of the vampires. Together, and with the help of Harry (Robert Williamson), who supplies Fion with a drug that helps to induce his visions, they work.

== Production ==
Night Kaleidoscope was shot in 5 days for £4,000. It was one of three micro-budget films McPhee worked on over the space of a month in December 2013 and January 2014 (the other two were Take It Back and Start All Over Again and Wigilia). All three had the same ethos and guidelines - to be made for under $6,000 and to use the opportunity of this micro-budget as a way to experiment.

== Release ==
Night Kaleidoscope premiered at the Days of the Dead convention in February 2017.

The film was released in 2017 on VHS, DVD and Streaming platforms to mixed reviews.

FilmThreat: “...Night Kaleidoscope looks and sounds incredible – especially considering that it was reportedly shot in just a single week around a few city blocks in Edinburgh. McPhee, who also serves as cinematographer, lends the film an attractively moody color palette and a distinct flavor for its daytime and nighttime sequences: when the sun is up, the camerawork is still and the cutting mostly calm; at night, when the wild things come out to play, the shots become jittery and chaotic, the editing reminiscent of a late-period Tony Scott film with its rapid-fire jump cuts and changes in film stock.......The film, for sure, has style to burn, but its problems mostly arise in the story department. Too often, (it) seems torn between pursuing the psychedelic abstraction conjured up by its title and telling a standard, if pulpy, good-versus-evil tale....“

InfernalCinema: "...a sleek and ultra stylish vampire flick that does leave other aspects behind in favour of its pursuit of some alluring and eye catching cinema.Throughout the entirety of Night Kaleidoscope it is loaded with bursts of footage and images that are all disturbing. It overwhelms the viewer when it happens, a bombardment of visions that feel like a wet dream of David Lynch or Cronenberg with plenty of drug use. In a way they are similar to pop videos on music channels, only without the dreadful music. And with images of blood or people being killed. They are all accompanied by a brooding and engaging score. Matching the imagery the soundtrack enhances the stylized vibe set throughout the entire feature. It creates a vibe that adds to what Night Kaleidoscope is trying to accomplish, namely a low budget horror that is rich in style.... Although at times it does feel like something else is needed to try and match the impressive visuals and style of the movie. The story doesn’t take up much of what is happening."

== Reception ==
Vinyl Soundtrack released by Trunk Records in 2019

DVD released by Redemption Films in the UK and Kino Lorber in the US

== Awards ==
Year	Film Festival	Award/Category	Result
2017	Bloodstained Indie Film Festival	Horror Feature	Nominated
2017	Diabolical Horror Film Festival	Best Cinematography	Won
2017	Genre Celebration Festival	Best Cinematography	Won
2017	Shiver International Film Festival	Best Horror Film	Won
2017	Shiver International Film Festival	Best Feature	Won
2017	Shiver International Film Festival	Best Director	Won
2017	Shiver International Film Festival	Best Male Performance (Patrick O’Brien)	Nominated
2017	Shiver International Film Festival	Best Practical Special Effects (Samantha Jack)	Nominated
2017	Shock Stock	Cinematography	Won
2017	Tabloid Witch Awards	Best Cinematography	Won

== Soundtrack ==
The soundtrack of the film by Alec Cheer was released on cd by Year Zero Records and on vinyl by Trunk Records in 2018.
