= List of Mushishi episodes =

Mushi-Shi is an anime television series based on the manga series by Yuki Urushibara. It premiered in Japan on October 23, 2005, but after 20 episodes, the series went on hiatus and resumed screening the remaining six on May 15, 2006. A special episode aired on January 4, 2014. A second series, Mushi-Shi -Next Passage-, started airing on April 5, 2014. The first half of the second series ended on June 21, 2014. The remainder of the series aired during the fall, preceded by a special episode, "Path of Thorns", which covers the two-chapter final story of volume 7 of the manga. Another special episode, "Bell Droplets", based on the manga's last arc, was released theatrically on May 16, 2015.

Mushi-Shi is an anthology series, where each episode tells a self-contained story and is not dependent on prior episodes for background. This made it possible for the producers of the anime to change the relative order of the stories. Aside from a slight abridgement of the dialogue, this is the only major difference between the manga and the anime.

The first series features an opening theme song, "The Sore Feet Song" by Ally Kerr, and each episode features a different ending composed by Toshio Masuda. The opening song for the second series is "Shiver" by Lucy Rose.

== Episode list ==
=== Mushi-Shi ===
No.	Title	Original release date
1	"The Green Seat"; Transliteration: "Midori no Za" (Japanese: 緑の座)	October 23, 2005
Ginko investigates the case of a young boy whose drawings, if drawn by his left hand, come to life. He soon realizes that someone is keeping the boy company.
2	"The Light of the Eyelid"; Transliteration: "Mabuta no Hikari" (Japanese: 瞼の光)	October 30, 2005
Ginko gives aid to a little girl who spends her days locked in a storage shed because she can't bear sunlight due to a strange disease. However, when her cousin catches the same disease as well, Ginko must find a way to get rid of the illness.
3	"Tender Horns"; Transliteration: "Yawarakai Tsuno" (Japanese: 柔らかい角)	November 6, 2005
A boy loses his hearing and grows a set of mysterious horns on his head. Ginko must determine the cause of his condition and find a cure before the boy succumbs to the fate of his mother, who died of the same condition.
4	"The Pillow Pathway"; Transliteration: "Makura no Kōji" (Japanese: 枕小路)	November 13, 2005
A sword-sharpener's dreams become reality. While at first it seems like a blessing, the phenomenon eventually becomes a nightmare, and Ginko needs to find out what is causing these nightmares to bleed into reality.
5	"The Traveling Swamp"; Transliteration: "Tabi o Suru Numa" (Japanese: 旅をする沼)	November 20, 2005
Ginko investigates the case of a mysterious teenage girl with green hair who is seen in a swamp which moves by itself. With the help of a good friend and the villagers, Ginko only has one chance to save her before the swamp inevitably dies.
6	"Those Who Inhale the Dew"; Transliteration: "Tsuyu o Suu Mure" (Japanese: 露を吸う群)	November 27, 2005
A boy from an isolated island requests Ginko's services to investigate the case of a girl revered by the people there as a god. In the process, they discover how greedy someone can be for respect and status.
7	"Raindrops and Rainbows"; Transliteration: "Ame ga Kuru Niji ga Tatsu" (Japanese: 雨がくる虹がたつ)	December 4, 2005
Ginko encounters a man who has a strange habit of pursuing rainbows. Like his father, the man seeks to understand rainbows and capture one.
8	"Where Sea Meets Man"; Transliteration: "Unasaka yori" (Japanese: 海境より)	December 11, 2005
While traveling along a beach, Ginko meets a man who hopes to learn the fate of his wife after she was lost at sea.
9	"The Heavy Seed"; Transliteration: "Omoi Mi" (Japanese: 重い実)	December 18, 2005
Ginko arrives at a village where there are unusual harvests, always occurring after natural disasters, and always involving the death of one of its inhabitants.
10	"The White Which Lives Within the Ink Stone"; Transliteration: "Suzuri ni Sumu Shiro" (Japanese: 硯に棲む白)	January 8, 2006
A group of kids get themselves in trouble when they mess with one of the mushi-related items from Adashino's collection. Ginko must seek the inkstone's maker to solve this problem.
11	"The Sleeping Mountain"; Transliteration: "Yama Nemuru" (Japanese: やまねむる)	January 8, 2006
During his travels, Ginko sees what appears to be a large hole in a mountain. Visiting the mountain, he is recruited by the villagers there to aid an old mushishi and his young apprentice.
12	"One-Eyed Fish"; Transliteration: "Sugame no Uo" (Japanese: 眇の魚)	January 15, 2006
An orphan boy is adopted by Nui, a white-haired female Mushishi. Ginko's origin is revealed.
13	"One-Night Bridge"; Transliteration: "Hitoyobashi" (Japanese: 一夜橋)	January 22, 2006
Ginko is called to a village to aid a young woman who has not been the same since a terrible fall three years before. While there, he meets a young man who loves her and learns the legend of a bridge that appears for only one night every twenty years.
14	"Inside the Cage"; Transliteration: "Kago no Naka" (Japanese: 籠のなか)	January 29, 2006
While traveling through a bamboo forest, Ginko encounters a man who somehow can't leave the forest, no matter how much he tries. Curiously, his wife and child also share the same issue.
15	"Pretense of Spring"; Transliteration: "Haru to Usobuku" (Japanese: 春と嘯く)	February 5, 2006
Ginko gets shelter in a cabin during the winter. The boy who lives there claims there is a place where spring blooms early and every time he goes there he ends up sleeping for days...or until the end of Spring.
16	"Sunrise Serpent"; Transliteration: "Akatsuki no Hebi" (Japanese: 暁の蛇)	February 12, 2006
Ginko helps a boy who is worried about his mother because she is little by little forgetting her memories.
17	"Pickers of Empty Cocoons"; Transliteration: "Uromayutori" (Japanese: 虚繭取り)	February 19, 2006
Ginko is worried about the girl who makes the cocoons used as mailboxes by the Mushishi, as she is still searching for her sister who disappeared when they were children.
18	"Clothes that Embrace the Mountain"; Transliteration: "Yama Daku Koromo" (Japanese: 山抱く衣)	February 26, 2006
Ginko gets his hands on a coat apparently possessed by a mushi. Hoping to figure out the truth, he starts looking for the coat's first owner.
19	"String from the Sky"; Transliteration: "Tenpen no Ito" (Japanese: 天辺の糸)	March 5, 2006
Ginko helps a girl who has been missing since she grabbed a string she saw hanging from the sky. Only the strength of the conviction of the man who loves her keeps her on the ground.
20	"A Sea of Writings"; Transliteration: "Fude no Umi" (Japanese: 筆の海)	March 12, 2006
Ginko comes to a house which has a library full of mushi-related scrolls. There, he meets the girl who writes the scrolls, and hears the story of the curse that has been afflicting her family for generations.
21	"Cotton Changeling"; Transliteration: "Watabōshi" (Japanese: 綿胞子)	May 15, 2006
Ginko is called to see a child who was developing a green rash through his body. He quickly figures that the child and his four brothers are not human.
22	"Shrine in the Sea"; Transliteration: "Okitsu Miya" (Japanese: 沖つ宮)	May 22, 2006
Ginko investigates a village with a shrine rumored to give people another life.
23	"The Sound of Rust"; Transliteration: "Sabi no Naku Koe" (Japanese: 錆の鳴く聲)	May 29, 2006
A girl is ostracized by her village because, according to a rumor, she is the cause of a strange rust that afflicts the houses and people there.
24	"The Journey to the Field of Fire"; Transliteration: "Kagarinokō" (Japanese: 篝野行)	June 5, 2006
Trying to dispose an unknown type of mushi which threatens her village, the local mushishi decides to burn down the whole mountain where it lives. But Ginko does not agree with the idea.
25	"Eye of Fortune, Eye of Misfortune"; Transliteration: "Ganpuku Ganka" (Japanese: 眼福眼禍)	June 12, 2006
Ginko encounters a woman who was blind when she was a child, until a mushi entered her eyes and granted her the ability of foresight. Although her sight improved day by day, she began seeing more than what she wished for.
26	"The Sound of Footsteps on the Grass"; Transliteration: "Kusa o Fumu Oto" (Japanese: 草を踏む音)	June 19, 2006
When Ginko was a child, he lived for a while with the Watari, a group of nomads, which every year visited a mysterious mountain. Among the nomads, there is another boy, Isaza, who befriends the son of the family who owns the mountain, and their friendship grows.
Special	"The Shadow That Devours the Sun"; Transliteration: "Hi Hamu Kage" (Japanese: 日蝕む翳)	January 4, 2014
A rare solar eclipse is predicted and Mushishi Ginko suspects the shadow mushi, Hihami, may reappear. In a farming village awaiting the eclipse, Ginko meets twins born during a lunar eclipse, one of whom, Hiyori, cannot go into the sunlight and spends her life indoors. Immediately following the solar eclipse, a strange black cloud gathers in the sky and blocks the sun once more. This enables Hiyori to go outside where she finds a field of flowers and the root of Hihami. However, the eclipse causes her sister Hinata to begin to fade away. Hiyori is torn between destroying the Hihami to save her sister or enjoying life outside her darkened room. Eventually she helps Ginko get rid of the Hihami and vows to help Hinata regain her solidity.

=== Mushi-Shi -Next Passage- ===
No.	Title	Original release date
1	"Banquet at the Forest's Edge"; Transliteration: "Nozue no Utage" (Japanese: 野末の宴)	April 5, 2014
A sake brewer once lost his way home and chanced upon a strange ceremony. There, he tasted a sweet, glowing sake that he's never been able to forget. Years later, his son follows in his footsteps and tries to brew a sake to match his father's. When the son, too, encounters a late-night ceremony, he pretends to be a part of it, meeting Ginko in the process.
2	"The Warbling Sea Shell"; Transliteration: "Saezuru Kai" (Japanese: 囀る貝)	April 12, 2014
Near a village by the sea, a girl lives with her father on a secluded crag. She wants to make friends, but her father, for some reason, doesn't want her associating with the village people. When Ginko arrives, he finds a mushi that's an omen of disaster. The shared threat brings the father and the village back together.
3	"Beneath the Snow"; Transliteration: "Yuki no Shita" (Japanese: 雪の下)	April 19, 2014
Ginko visits a village where it snows most of the year to study snow mushi. He finds a boy with a strange affliction that causes snow to fall on him perpetually. He's become insensitive to the cold, and warmth is painful for him. It's dangerous for him to expose himself to the cold so much, but he doesn't even seem to care.
4	"The Hand That Caresses the Night"; Transliteration: "Yoru o Naderu Te" (Japanese: 夜を撫でる手)	April 26, 2014
A young man has the power to lure animals to him using a scent issuing from his hand. He inherited this power from his father, and it makes hunting easier. But it makes the meat from his prey taste foul. More serious is the risk of losing his mind to the power and confusing family with prey. There's a cure, but will the boy be willing to give up his power?
5	"Mirror Lake"; Transliteration: "Kagami ga Fuchi" (Japanese: 鏡が淵)	May 3, 2014
Ginko encounters a young woman being followed by a mysterious, watery creature. The woman becomes weak, and her family believes it to be lovesickness. Ginko reveals the truth of the mushi attached to her, but the woman must decide whether to give up her body to the mushi, or to dispel it and continue living.
6	"Floral Delusion"; Transliteration: "Hana Madoi" (Japanese: 花惑い)	May 10, 2014
Ginko meets a woman with a striking beauty that lacks all five senses and according to the man who takes care of her, is over 80 years old and has lived in his family for generations. While investigating the mushi responsible for it, Ginko discovers an even darker secret involving the two.
7	"Cloudless Rain"; Transliteration: "Hi Teru Ame" (Japanese: 日照る雨)	May 24, 2014
A woman afflicted by a water-type mushi decides to make use of her condition to help those in need.
8	"Wind Raiser"; Transliteration: "Shimaki Tatsu" (Japanese: 風巻立つ)	June 7, 2014
While on board a boat, Ginko meets a young man who has developed a connection to a flock of bird-type mushi able to create wind.
9	"Valley of the Welling Tides"; Transliteration: "Ushio Waku Tani" (Japanese: 潮わく谷)	June 14, 2014
Ginko falls unconscious on a snowy mountain. He is helped by locals who somehow manage to grow their fields despite the weather, mainly because of a worker with unabated stamina. But at what cost does this vigor come?
10	"Depths of Winter"; Transliteration: "Fuyu no Soko" (Japanese: 冬の底)	June 21, 2014
On his way to answer a summons, Ginko is trapped on a mountain that has been sealed by the mountain lord, and is experiencing an eternal winter, with some trapped snow-mushi. Why has the mountain lord sealed the mountain, and how will Ginko escape this eternal winter?
Special	"Path of Thorns"; Transliteration: "Odoro no Michi" (Japanese: 棘のみち)	August 20, 2014
At the request of Karibusa Tan'yuu, Ginko sets off to investigate a phenomenon that might be related to a dangerous mushi. He encounters the taciturn Kumado Minai, the current head of a long line of mushishi, who's in charge of the area. Kumado leads Ginko to the bottom of the Path of Thorns, from where mushi pass into the human world where they encounter the soul-devouring Sanekuimushi. Kumado tries to fight it with his artificial mushi created from Kouki, but only just survives and is rescued by Ginko.
11	"Cushion of Grass"; Transliteration: "Kusa no Shitone" (Japanese: 草の茵)	October 19, 2014
After his encounter with Nui and before becoming a mushishi, Ginko is instructed and cared for by a mushishi named Suguro. Suguro tells the young Ginko that he must always move from place to place due to his condition of attracting mushi. They are in the lands of a dying Mountain Lord and Suguro worries that the new Mountain Lord hasn't yet appeared. Ginko finds the golden egg of the new Mountain Lord but drops and breaks it, condemning the mountain to a period of decline until a new one appears.
12	"Fragrant Darkness"; Transliteration: "Kaoru Yami" (Japanese: 香る闇)	October 26, 2014
A farmer is haunted by forgotten memories of his life whenever he smells the scent of flowers at night. Ginko appears at his home on a rainy night seeking shelter, and says that he is the victim of a mushi. The Kairou mushi appears as a tunnel and condemns anyone who enters it, to eternally reliving their life. Ginko warns the farmer against re-entering the tunnel. However when his wife falls and is fatally injured, the farmer re-enters the tunnel to relive his happy life with her.
13	"Lingering Crimson"; Transliteration: "Nokori Beni" (Japanese: 残り紅)	November 2, 2014
At dusk, about to go home after playing with her friends, a young girl named Akane found a shadow without a caster. On that same day, she disappeared. Several years later, Ginko is told the story of Mikage, a girl who appeared with no memories at Akane's village shortly after the vanishment of the latter.
14	"Hidden Cove"; Transliteration: "Komori E" (Japanese: 隠り江)	November 9, 2014
Yura and Sumi, the former's caretaker, were close friends. Eventually, as they were moved apart, Yura could still feel Sumi's presence. However, whenever that happened, she'd become like an empty shell, worrying her father. As Ginko becomes aware of the case, he proceeds to offer them advice, as the condition is caused by a mushi that can connect people's minds.
15	"Thread of Light"; Transliteration: "Hikari no O" (Japanese: 光の緒)	November 16, 2014
A boy named Gen troubles his father by being too rough with other kids, who pick on him due to his absent mother. The child, too strong for his age, also claims to be able to see strange creatures that no one else sees. As Ginko arrives at Gen's place, the story behind Gen's strength is revealed as the mushishi recounts the day he met a woman who'd woven a mysterious seamless garment.
16	"Sea of Otherworldly Stars"; Transliteration: "Koten no Hoshi" (Japanese: 壷天の星)	November 23, 2014
Izumi is alone in a world that mirrors our own. Having forgotten how she came to be there, she remains trapped while her family searches in vain. Her father believes she has been kidnapped, while her mother and sister Mizuho believe that she is still inside the house, even though they cannot see her. Ginko crosses into the other world to try to save her.
17	"Azure Waters"; Transliteration: "Mizu Aomu" (Japanese: 水碧む)	November 30, 2014
Ginko encounters Yuuta, a boy who is excellent at swimming and fishing but has webbed hands and cold skin. After discovering the boy's unnatural affinity for water, he sets out to treat the rain mushi causing his strange behavior.
18	"Lightning's End"; Transliteration: "Ikazuchi no Tamoto" (Japanese: 雷の袂)	December 7, 2014
Multiple lightning strikes have been observed hitting the same tree, and Ginko investigates. He meets a strange boy who attracts lightning to himself due to a mushi's influence. His mother believes he is doing it to spite her and struggles with the fact that she doesn't love her child.
19	"Mud Grass"; Transliteration: "Doro no Kusa" (Japanese: 泥の草)	December 14, 2014
Shigeru's daughter (Yuri) is found dead in the mountains. A painful skin infection breaks out in his village. Ginko can cure the disease of the villagers but Shigeru has a much more serious case. It turns out that he and the son of his deceased brother brought the mushi causing the problem back to the village when they broke a taboo.
20	"Tree of Eternity"; Transliteration: "Tokoshie no Ki" (Japanese: 常の樹)	December 21, 2014
A restless man, Kanta, on his way home to his wife and young daughter (Futaba), sits down to rest in a forest. He is tired and thirsty so he eats a red fruit that was lying on the ground near him, and gives thanks to the plum. Some time after this, he starts having vivid memories both in his dreams and while awake of times going back before his birth. He goes looking for a huge tree but finding it does not make him happy.
Film	"Bell Droplets"; Transliteration: "Suzu no Shizuku" (Japanese: 鈴の雫)	May 16, 2015
A girl, Kaya, is born with plants growing from her head and accompanied by the sound of bells. She becomes lord of a mountain and Ginko stumbles upon her as a teenager although he finds it strange that a human was chosen as the mountain lord. He meets her older brother who has searched for her since she disappeared years earlier. Ginko offers Kaya the opportunity to become human again and rejoin her family, but at a risk to his own life. Kaya intervenes as Ginko is being judged by the law of the mountain and she is consumed instead of Ginko. Her brother finally accepts her fate but keeps her memory alive by placing offerings in the forest.
