= Superstar (band) =

Scottish rock band

Background information
- Origin: Glasgow, Scotland
- Genres: Alternative rock
- Years active: 1991–2000
- Labels: Creation; Capitol; Camp Fabulous
- Past members: Joe McAlinden; Jim McCulloch; Quentin McAfee; Alan Hutchison; Nellie Grant; Raymond Prior

Superstar were a Scottish rock band founded in 1991.

== History ==
The band was formed in 1991 by Joe McAlinden, a former member of The Groovy Little Numbers and the BMX Bandits, who also arranged strings for the band Teenage Fanclub. They first appeared on Creation Records in 1992 with the album Greatest Hits vol. 1, which was followed by the Capitol Records album Superstar on 28 June 1994. The band regrouped in 1996 and Jim McCulloch, formerly of the Soup Dragons and the original line-up of the BMX Bandits, joined on lead guitar. They signed a deal with the Camp Fabulous label, who issued the 18 Carat album in 1997. Their single "Superstar" reached number 49 on the UK Singles Chart, but gained a wider audience when it was covered by Rod Stewart on When We Were the New Boys.

== Discography ==
=== Albums ===
- Greatest Hits Volume 1 (1992), Creation Records
- Superstar (1994), Capitol
- 18 Carat (1997), Camp Fabulous
- Palm Tree (1998), Camp Fabulous
- Phat Dat (2000), Camp Fabulous
- Six More Songs (2000), Camp Fabulous

=== EPs ===
- Every Day I Fall Apart EP (1997), Camp Fabulous
- Superstar vs Alan Warner EP (1998) (a collaboration with author Alan Warner)

=== Singles ===
- "Could It Be You" (1994), Superstar Records
- "Breathing Space" (1997), Camp Fabulous
- "Every Day I Fall Apart" (1997), Camp Fabulous – UK No. 66
- "Superstar" (1998), Camp Fabulous – UK No. 49
- "I Love Love" (2000), Camp Fabulous

== Line-ups ==
=== 1992 ===
- McAlinden, Nellie Grant, Raymond Prior

=== 1996 ===
- McAlinden, Jim McCulloch, drummer Quentin McAfee and bass player Alan Hutchison
