= Duglas T. Stewart =

British singer-songwriter

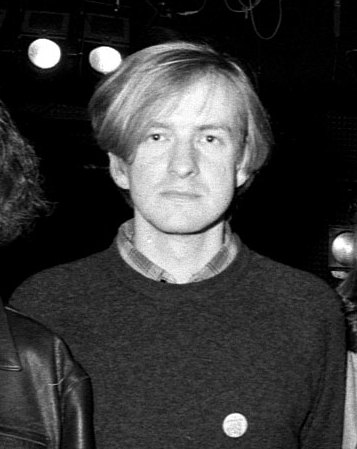
Stewart in 1991

Duglas T. Stewart (born 30 December 1964) has been leader and the main composer of Glaswegian indie pop band BMX Bandits since they formed in 1985.

Stewart's songs often have a distinctive and wry combination of whimsy, bittersweet romance and are highly melodic. Primary influences in Stewart's song writing ranges from Brian Wilson to Serge Gainsbourg to Disney staples The Sherman Brothers. He has also cowritten material for The Pearlfishers and written for and produced Korean jazz pop singer Yeon Gene Wang.

Stewart has produced recordings for artists including Alex Chilton, Chip Taylor, Stevie Jackson, Eugene Kelly, Ally Kerr, Nick Garrie and Norman Blake. He co-organised critically acclaimed tribute shows to Brian Wilson, Ennio Morricone and Serge Gainsbourg and co-produced the various artists tribute album to Brian Wilson Caroline Now!.

Stewart released a solo album, Duglas Stewart's Frankenstein in 1996, which featured contributions from other BMX Bandits members. In 2016 the feature length independent film Wigilia was given a limited release. The film starred and was co-written by Stewart and contained an original song "Agata's Song" written by him.

Stewart also features in the 2017 documentary Teenage Superstars.
