= Rote Kapelle (disambiguation) =

Rote Kapelle is the original, German name of a communist spy ring in Nazi-occupied Europe during the Second World War, see Red Orchestra (espionage).

Rote Kapelle may also refer to:

- Rote Kapelle (band), a Scottish band
- The Red Chapel (Det Røde Kapel), a 2010 Danish documentary
- KLK Calling PTZ – The Red Orchestra, a 1971 East German movie about the Red Orchestra
- Die rote Kapelle, a 1972 West German television mini series about the Red Orchestra
