= 53rd & 3rd =

53rd & 3rd may refer to:

- 53rd & 3rd (record label), a Scottish independent record label founded in 1985
- 53rd & 3rd (song), a song by the Ramones from their 1976 debut album
