= The Motorcycle Boy =

Scottish indie pop

The Motorcycle Boy were a Scottish indie pop band formed in Edinburgh, Scotland, in 1987 by former members of Meat Whiplash and Shop Assistants.

== History ==
The band consisted of Alex Taylor (vocals, formerly of Shop Assistants), Paul McDermott (drums), Michael Kerr (guitar), and Eddy Connelly (bass) (all formerly of Meat Whiplash), and David "Scottie" Scott (guitar). They were signed by Rough Trade Records, who issued their debut single, "Big Rock Candy Mountain", which reached number 2 in the UK Independent Chart. The band were then signed by Chrysalis Records, with two singles, but failed to achieve great success despite considerable press attention. Their debut album Scarlet (which had additional drumming by Anthony Cooper and keyboards from former Jesse Garon and The Desperadoes guitarist Stuart Clarke) was never released. The band then split with Chrysalis, with two further singles released on the Nymphaea Pink Sensation label in 1990, before the band themselves split up.

The group made the cover of NME on September 19, 1987, despite only having a brief half-page feature. This was because the entire contents of a themed issue on censorship (which would have had a painting used on Dead Kennedys' album Frankenchrist, then the subject of an obscenity trial in the US, on the cover) had themselves been censored, with Stuart Cosgrove sacked from the paper, and a new cover had to be designed at very short notice.

Decades after the break-up of the band, Forgotten Astronaut Records procured the licence for the unreleased album Scarlet, and released the album in late 2019. It was released on both CD and vinyl, with the CD containing two bonus tracks, the Flood-produced "Sweet Dreams Pretty Baby", and the Pat Collier-produced "Days Like These".

It was revealed in 2020 that Alex Taylor had died in 2005.

Anthony Cooper, who played drums on the Scarlet album, died in 2018, and Eddie Connelly died in December 2023.

The band features in the book Postcards from Scotland detailing the 1980s and 1990s independent music scene in Scotland.

== Discography ==
=== Singles ===
- "Big Rock Candy Mountain" (7") (1987) Rough Trade RT 210
  - A. Big Rock Candy Mountain - 3:13
  - B. Room at the Top - 3:55
- "Big Rock Candy Mountain" (12") (1987) Rough Trade RTT 210
  - A. Big Rock Candy Mountain (Velocity Dance Mix) - 4:40
  - B1. Room at the Top - 3:55
  - B2. His Latest Flame - 2:18
  - B3. Big Rock Candy Mountain (7" Mix) - 3:13
- "Hey Mama" (12" white label promo copy) (1988) Blue Guitar / Chrysalis AZURX 10
- A. Hey Mama (Born Bad Mix)
  - B1. Days Like These
  - B2. Will You Still Love Me Tomorrow
  - B3. Hey Mama (7" Version)
- "Trying to Be Kind" (7") (26 June 1989) Chrysalis CHS 3310
  - A. Trying to Be Kind
  - B. World Falls Into Place
- "Trying to Be Kind" (12") (26 June 1989) Chrysalis CHS 12 3310
  - A. Trying to Be Kind (Extended Mix)
  - B1. World Falls Into Place
  - B2. Will You Love Me Tomorrow
  - B3. Trying to Be Kind (1,000cc Version)
- "You and Me Against the World" (7") (1989) Chrysalis CHS 3398
  - A. You and Me Against the World
  - B. Under the Bridge
- "You and Me Against the World" (12″) (1989) Chrysalis CHS 12 3398
  - A. You and Me Against the World
  - B1. Under the Bridge
  - B2. Some Girls
  - B3. You and Me Against the World (Extended Mix)
- "The Road Goes On Forever" (12") (1990) Nymphaea Pink Sensation NPS T001
  - A1. Starlight - 3:20
  - A2. Starlight (Paradise A Go-Go Mix) - 5:05
  - B1. The Road Goes On Forever (Overdrive Karma Mix) - 5:16
  - B2. Salvation - 3:13
  - B3. The Road Goes On Forever- 3:26
- "Here She Comes" (12") (1990) Nymphaea Pink Sensation NPS T002
  - A. Here She Comes
  - B1. Everything I See
  - B3. The Road Goes On Forever (Live)

=== Albums ===
Scarlet album cover

- Scarlet (2019) Forgotten Astronaut Records
  1. Hey Mama
  2. Baby Let Go Of My Heart
  3. The World Falls Into Place
  4. Valentine
  5. No Pain
  6. Take Me For A Walk
  7. Some Girls
  8. Under The Bridge
  9. Trying To Be Kind
  10. Scarlet
  11. Big Rock Candy Mountain
  12. Up Here
  13. Sweet Dreams Pretty Baby (bonus track)
  14. Days Like These (bonus track)

=== Appearance on compilation albums ===
- "Indie Top 20 Volume III - War Of Independents" (2LP) (1988) Beechwood Music TT03
  - A6. Big Rock Candy Mountain - 3:13
- "Indie Top 20 Volume III - War Of Independents" (2Cass) (1988) Beechwood Music, Melody Maker TT03MC
  - A6. Big Rock Candy Mountain
- "Art Of Compilation CD 7" (CD, Promo) (1991) Art Of Mix CD 7
  - 7. Here She Comes (Digi Boy Mix) - 6:51
- "Precision Three" (12", Promo) (1991) Art Of Mix AMP-9003
  - A2. Here She Comes (Digi Boy Mix)

== Bibliography ==
- "Shop Assistants, The Fizzbombs, The Motorcycle Boy" chapter in YinPop: Women in Indie and Alternative Rock, Vol. 1: UK Bands (2014), by S. White. Fly-By-Night Books, ISBN 978-0-9905386-0-8, pp. 131-148.
