= Teenage Superstars =

- Directed by: Grant McPhee
- Written by: Angela Slaven
- Produced by: Grant McPhee; Wendy Griffin; Erik Sandberg; Angela Slaven
- Starring: Stephen McRobbie; Duglas T. Stewart; Norman Blake; Sean Dickson; Thurston Moore; Frances McKee; Eugene Kelly; Alan McGee
- Narrated by: Kim Deal
- Cinematography: Grant McPhee; Martin Parry; Garry Torrance
- Edited by: Angela Slaven
- Distributed by: Tartan Features
- Release date: June 2017
- Running time: 107 minutes
- Country: Scotland
- Language: English

Teenage Superstars is a 2017 film about the Glasgow independent music scene between 1982 and 1992, focusing on the bands that emerged from in and around the city at this point including The Pastels, BMX Bandits, The Soup Dragons, Teenage Fanclub, The Vaselines, The Jesus and Mary Chain and Primal Scream. In doing so, the film also considers the early days of Creation Records and Stephen Pastel, David Keegan and Sandy McLean’s 53rd & 3rd record label. The film follows on chronologically from 2015's Big Gold Dream, also directed by Grant McPhee, with its title taken from The Vaselines song "Teenage Superstars".

== Overview ==
Teenage Superstars charts a generation of musicians from Glasgow and Lanarkshire from 1982. Broadly speaking, it is chronologically structured, while also tracing the geographical and social connections between some of the bands (for example, the childhood friendship of Sean Dickson, Duglas T. Stewart and Norman Blake, all from Bellshill). The film's story follows the formation of the featured bands, the friendships between them and sharing of band members, the commercial success of The Soup Dragons, Primal Scream and Teenage Fanclub, and the bond between the Scottish and US indie scenes of the early 1990s before the scene they had created gave way to Britpop.

== Production ==
McPhee had originally planned to make a single film - titled The Sound of Young Scotland - about Postcard Records and The Fire Engines, but as production continued, found that "a fuller story was beginning to emerge," and that the story of the Glaswegian scene from 1982, while a continuation of Big Gold Dream, was a story in its own right "which warranted a film in itself."

== Release ==
Teenage Superstars premiered on 22 June 2017 at the Edinburgh International Film Festival, where it was nominated for the Audience Award and Best Documentary, going on to show at Raindance in September of that year. It received its cinema premiere in 2018 at the Glasgow Film Festival and was part of the National Museum of Scotland's 2018 "Rip It Up" exhibition, screening at Edinburgh's Filmhouse.

== Reception ==
Teenage Superstars has received generally positive reviews, including 4 out of 5 stars in both The List and The Skinny, with The Herald calling it "a real treat for music fans".

Having completed a successful festival run, the documentary was picked up by Sky Arts, receiving its television premiere on the 23 January 2021. It was highly reviewed as Pick of the Day on The Guardian, The Times and The Telegraph.

Rolling Stone included Teenage Superstars in their 10 Essential British Documentaries alongside The Beatles 'Get Back'.

An interview only companion film, Fast Forward that covers the contemporaneous Edinburgh scene was announced in 2021

A book called Postcards From Scotland, was released in 2024 which covers the film subject in far greater detail while bringing in the Edinburgh side of the story that was to be covered in the unreleased companion film, Fast Forward.
