= Complete Recordings (Black Tambourine album) =

Compilation album by Black Tambourine
- Recorded: 1989–1992
- Genre: Indie rock, noise pop, indie pop
- Label: Slumberland Records

Complete Recordings is a 1999 compilation album by the indie pop band Black Tambourine. Despite its title, it does not actually contain the complete recordings of the band. The later album Black Tambourine featured six additional tracks, thus replacing this album.

== Reception ==
AllMusic reviewer Nitsuh Abebe gave the album a 4.5/5 and said that the album "serves as a time capsule for the indie pop culture of its contemporaries". Pitchfork reviewer Chris Ott gave the album a 8.5/10 and said that the album "provides a glimpse back at a more innocent time in indie rock, when a group of young musicians realized there was an audience for their low-budget dream-pop records" and that "if there's any justice, Black Tambourine will see their name inserted into revisionist histories of American independent rock. Though their existence was laughably short, the band concocted a great sound out of step with even their peers, pointing the way for a string of female-fronted underground bands formed soon after their demise."

Professional ratings
Review scores
Source	Rating
Allmusic	4.5/5 stars
Pitchfork Media	(8.5/10)

== Track listing ==
All tracks are written by Black Tambourine, except where noted.

1. "For Ex-Lovers Only" - 2:41
2. "Black Car" - 3:29
3. "Pack You Up" - 2:27
4. "Can't Explain" (John Echols, John Fleck, Arthur Lee) - 2:24
5. "I Was Wrong" - 1:36
6. "Throw Aggi Off the Bridge" - 3:18
7. "Drown" - 2:42
8. "We Can't Be Friends" - 1:50
9. "By Tomorrow" - 3:05
10. "Pam's Tan" - 1:20
