= Sarah's Room =

- Film poster
- Directed by: Grant McPhee
- Written by: Chris Purnell
- Produced by: Steven Moore
- Starring: Kitty Colquhoun; Patrick O'Brien; Hanna Stanbridge
- Cinematography: Grant McPhee
- Edited by: Ben McKinstrie
- Distributed by: Tartan Features
- Release date: 2013
- Running time: 85 minutes
- Country: Scotland
- Language: English

Sarah's Room also known as To Here Knows When, is a 2013 psychedelic ambient horror/thriller directed by Grant McPhee and written by Chris Purnell. It follows the relationship between Joe (Patrick O’Brien) and Emma (Kitty Colquhoun) and their enigmatic lodger, Sarah (Hanna Stanbridge). The film is McPhee's debut feature.

== Plot ==
On returning to the home he shares with his wife in Edinburgh after a mysterious absence, Joe has to get to grips with the presence of Sarah, a lodger taken by Emma. Struggling with his wife's relationship with Sarah and his own obsessive thoughts and paranoia, his life falls apart as he turns to alcohol, taking a dramatic turn when his perceptions spill into reality.

== Production ==
Sarah's Room was made for $6,000 in just over 5 days in Edinburgh in 2013. McPhee has said that he aimed to create something that “looked far more expensive and unusual than the majority of micro budget feature films.” To this end, the film was shot on Red, with second unit footage captured using DSLR. The film was edited on-set parallel to filming.

== Music ==
Sarah's Room is scored by Scottish musicians. Alec Cheer and Drew Wright, who were nominated for Best Original Music at the 2014 BAFTA Scotland New Talent Awards.

== Release ==
The film premiered at the 2013 New York Bootleg Film Festival, before going on to show at the Eureka Springs Digital Film Festival, Boston Independent Film Festival and the Los Angeles Independent Film Festival.

== Critical reception ==
The film was released on DVD and Streaming services in 2014 to mixed reviews.

Eye for Film gave it 3/5 stars saying "the film moves too slowly at first but gradually gathers pace, building to a much stronger conclusion."

Micro Filmmaker Review - “As much as this film frustrated me due to its sheer subjectivity and made me want to rant against it, the fact is: Sarah’s Room is created to the objective levels needed for it to enter the world of art, where it has the right to be completely subjective. It is not a horror film; it is an experimental film for lovers of arthouse cinema.”

Film Pulse - “The fact that a movie made for only £4,000 can look this good is a testament that one doesn’t need a seven-figure budget to make something look great. It’s these visuals that prove to be the highlight of Sarah’s Room, accentuating the disjointed confusion of the film. Conversely, this confusion parlays into the audience’s perception of the movie, resulting in a plot muddled by lack of exposition.”

The Independent Critic gave it 3.5/5 stars - “...a thoughtful and compelling film that pulls you in even as you don't quite realize exactly when you're being pulled in. The characters are certainly compelling and the cast, including a terrific Hannah Stanbridge along with the equally good Patrick O'Brien and Kitty Colquhoun, is uniformly strong and never less than convincing. It happens far too often in this kind of film that the performances give away the film's twists and turns, but this terrific ensemble cast does a great job of remaining mysterious while being emotionally resonant.”

Film Threat - “Grant McPhee’s feature film, Sarah’s Room, is a stylish, yet slow paced, psychological drama... Overall,... there is much to like within Sarah’s Room, but ... it makes full engagement with the material difficult. Too often the film feels like it is spinning its wheels, and when it does wrap up and you look back, you realize the narrative journey it took you on was actually very short, all things considered.”

== Awards ==
Year	Film Festival	Award	Achievement
2013	Bootleg Film Festival New York	Cinematography	Won
2014	BAFTA Scotland New Talent	Sound Design (William Cory)	Nominated
2014	BAFTA Scotland New Talent	Best Original Music	Nominated
2015	Eureka Springs Digital Film Festival	Best Foreign Film	Nominated
2015	Fife Film Expo	Best Feature	Won
2015	Fife Film Expo	Best Cinematography	Won
2015	Jerome Indie Film and Music Festival	Best Narrative Feature	Won
February 2015	Los Angeles Independent Film Festival Awards	Best Action/Thriller/Horror/Fantasy	Nominated
February 2015	Los Angeles Independent Film Festival Awards	Best Cinematography	Nominated
