= Sagar Radia =

English actor

- Born: April 14, 1987 (age 39); Harrow
- Agent: Elizabeth Fieldhouse
- Known for: Industry (TV)

Sagar Radia is an English television and film actor. Since 2020, he has portrayed Rishi Ramdani in the HBO series Industry.

== Early life ==
He was brought up in Harrow, London. His mother was a teacher at a primary school and his father worked in the post office. His sister works in finance. He studied at City, University of London and worked in marketing before focusing in acting.

== Career ==
He had an early role in Casualty. He appeared in Peter Kosminsky’s Britz alongside Riz Ahmed, playing brothers, and had a recurring role in ITV series The Good Karma Hospital. He was also understudy to Jesse Eisenberg in the theatre production The Spoils at Trafalgar Studios in London in 2016.

Since 2020, Radia has played trader Rishi Ramdani in the HBO series Industry. The character gained more screen time in the sophomore season and became a series regular in season three in 2024, with the character described as a "fan favourite". The episode White Mischief in the third series focused centrally on him, with the episode being praised as a “standout” episode of the series as he struggles with debt, with his character described "as hubristic and greedy as Adam Sandler’s Howard Ratner in Uncut Gems", a film which Radia said he watched prior to filming the episode.

In 2022, he began production on the interactive romantic comedy video game 10 Dates. He appeared in the 2023 British film Unicorns. He has a role in BBC Alba Scotland-set drama An t-Eilean (The Island).

In June of 2026, Radia was announced to join the cast of Joseph Gordon-Levitt's AI Thriller for Netflix.

== Personal life ==
A keen football fan, he supports Manchester United. He lives in London. When he was a struggling actor, he worked at Selfridges.

== Partial filmography ==
Year	Title	Role	Notes
2007	Britz	Rafiq Wahid	
2014	Doctors	Wasim Malik	1 episode
2015	Mission: Impossible – Rogue Nation	Controlled Lab technician	
2015	Holby City	Zayn	2 episodes
2016	Stan Lee's Lucky Man	PC Tariq	1 episode
2017–2019	The Good Karma Hospital	AJ Nair	15 episodes
2020–present	Industry	Rishi Ramdani	24 episodes
2023	Unicorns	Faiz	
2025	An t-Eilean	DCI Ahmed Halim	
2026	Bait	Asim	1 episode
TBA	2034 †	TBA	Post-production
TBA	The Trial of Louise Woodward	Sunil Eappen	
