= The Clouds (Scottish band) =

Scottish indie pop band

The Clouds were a Scottish, Glasgow-based indie pop band from the 1980s, fronted by brothers John and Bill Charnley.

"Tranquil", The Clouds' only single (on the Subway Organisation label), had a hit on the UK Indie Chart in 1988, reaching number 13. The two songs on the records B side were "Get Out of my Dream" and "Village Green", both written by the Charnley brothers. The released track included John on guitar and vocals, Bill on keyboard and vocals, Gino Ionta on drums, Andy Brady on bass guitar and Norman Blake on lead guitar and backing vocals.
