= 2034 (film) =

- Directed by: Joseph Gordon-Levitt
- Screenplay by: Kieran Fitzgerald; Joseph Gordon-Levitt
- Story by: Kieran Fitzgerald; Joseph Gordon-Levitt; Natasha Lyonne
- Produced by: Rian Johnson; Ram Bergman; Joseph Gordon-Levitt; Kieran Fitzgerald
- Starring: Rachel McAdams; Jeff Daniels; Joel Edgerton; Caleb McLaughlin; Nnamdi Asomugha; Alfre Woodard; Toni Collette; Chloe Coleman; Sagar Radia
- Production company: T-Street
- Distributed by: Netflix
- Country: United States
- Language: English

2034 is an upcoming American thriller film directed by Joseph Gordon-Levitt and co-written by Kieran Fitzgerald. It stars Rachel McAdams, Jeff Daniels, Joel Edgerton, Caleb McLaughlin, Nnamdi Asomugha, Alfre Woodard, Toni Collette, Chloe Coleman, and Sagar Radia.

== Cast ==
- Rachel McAdams
- Jeff Daniels
- Joel Edgerton
- Caleb McLaughlin
- Nnamdi Asomugha
- Alfre Woodard
- Toni Collette
- Chloe Coleman
- Sagar Radia

== Production ==
In December 2024, it was announced that actor Joseph Gordon-Levitt would be directing a then-untitled AI thriller film, co-written by Kieran Fitzgerald, produced by Rian Johnson and Ram Bergman, and starring Anne Hathaway. In October 2025, Hathaway exited the project, with Rachel McAdams replacing her. Later that month, Netflix acquired the distribution rights.

Principal photography began on May 4, 2026, in Belgrade and Montenegro, when Jeff Daniels, Joel Edgerton, Caleb McLaughlin, and Nnamdi Asomugha joined the cast. Filming was expected to conclude in July 2026. In June 2026, Alfre Woodard, Toni Collette, Chloe Coleman, and Sagar Radia rounded out the cast.
