= An t-Eilean =

Scottish Gaelic-language television drama series

- Genre: Crime drama
- Created by: Nicholas Osborne
- Written by: Nicholas Osborne; Patsi Mackenzie
- Screenplay by: Nicholas Osborne
- Directed by: Tom Sullivan
- Starring: Sorcha Groundsell; Sagar Radia; Elspeth Turner; Iain Macrae; Sinéad MacInnes; Andrew MacInnes; Meredith Brook; Sam James Smith; Kenny Boyle; Colin McCredie; Sharyn Ferguson
- Country of origin: United Kingdom (Scotland)
- Original language: Scottish Gaelic
- No. of series: 1
- No. of episodes: 4

Production
- Executive producer: Arabella Page Croft
- Running time: 47-51 minutes
- Production companies: Black Camel Pictures; MG Alba; Screen Scotland

Original release
- Network: BBC Alba
- Release: 14 January 2025

An t-Eilean (The Island) is a Scottish Gaelic-language crime drama television series produced for BBC Alba by Black Camel Pictures and broadcast in January 2025.

== Premise ==
Set in the Outer Hebrides, four Maclean siblings (Eilidh, Calum, Ruaraidh and Sìne) return to their family home after the shooting death of their mother, Lady Mary with their father, Sir Douglas being questioned by police. Former resident, Kat Crichton is assigned as family liaison officer to the Macleans by her boss, DCI Ahmed Halim. Initially Mary's death is presented as a robbery gone wrong, with Douglas seriously wounded by a gun-wielding masked intruder.

== Cast ==
- Sorcha Groundsell as Kat Crichton: Inverness-based family liaison officer, former Harris resident
- Sagar Radia as DCI Ahmed Halim: senior investigative officer, Kat's boss
- Iain Macrae as Sir Douglas Maclean: family patriarch, wealthy, ruthless businessman
- Elspeth Turner as Lady Mary Maclean: Douglas' wife, Calum, Ruaraidh and Sìne's mother
- Sinéad MacInnes as Eilidh Maclean: adopted daughter
- Andrew Macinnes as Calum Maclean: former musician, heavily in debt, Tracey's husband, Dougie's father
- Meredith Brook as Sìne Maclean: doctor, youngest sibling
- Sam James Smith as Ruaraidh Maclean: younger son
- Kenny Boyle as An Dotair
- Colin McCredie as PC Alan Irons
- Sharyn Ferguson as Tracey: Calum's wife, Dougie's mother

== Production ==
The four-part series has a storyline by Nicholas Osborne and is co-written by Patsi Mackenzie. It is produced by Black Camel Pictures and directed by Tom Sullivan. Arabella Page Croft, executive producer at Black Camel Pictures, described it as "the first ever high-end Gaelic-language drama made in Scotland". The series has a budget of £1M an episode.

In April 2024, Sorcha Groundsell, Elspeth Turner and Iain Macrae were cast in the lead roles. Additionally, Sagar Radia has a role in the series.

Principal photography took place on Harris, Outer Hebrides, in April 2024 with filming locations including Amhuinnsuidhe Castle. The series was renewed in 2026, with filming planned for the spring of that year.

== Broadcast ==
The series was broadcast from 14 January 2025 on BBC Alba, along with the boxset on BBC iPlayer. It was broadcast as a double bill on BBC Four on its Saturday night drama slot from 15 February 2025.

The series has also been sold internationally, including to Danish public broadcaster Danmarks Radio.

== Reception ==
Rebecca Nicholson for The Guardian described the setting as "breathtakingly beautiful" and praised the performance of Groundsell, describing the series as a whole as "a good, solid crime drama, albeit one that doesn’t upend the genre" and felt that a Gaelic language drama was overdue given the success of other foreign-language series in recent years proved that subtitles were not a hindrance.

In April 2025, the series won the drama and entertainment prize at Prix Circom 2025, the international television awards. It was nominated for Best Scripted Series at the 2025 British Academy Scotland Awards.
