= Far from the Apple Tree =

- Directed by: Grant McPhee
- Written by: Ben Soper
- Produced by: Olivia Gifford Grant McPhee Steven Moore
- Starring: Sorcha Groundsell Victoria Lidelle Scarlett Mack
- Cinematography: Simon Vickery
- Edited by: Ben McKinstrie; Andy Morrison
- Production company: Tartan Features
- Distributed by: Salvation Films
- Release date: 4 May 2019
- Running time: 89 minutes
- Country: United Kingdom
- Language: English

Far From the Apple Tree is a Scottish fantasy film that was directed by Grant McPhee and produced by Tartan Features. The film stars Sorcha Groundsell as a struggling artist who finds herself facing strange events after being hired by a renowned and sinister visual artist.

== Plot ==
Far from the Apple Tree follows the story of Judith, a young artist at the start of her career, who lands a job with a renowned visual artist called Roberta Roslyn. She lands her dream job when she is spotted by Roberta at one of her art gallery exhibitions and hired to help catalogue her work.

Whilst on the job she is shocked to see a girl who closely resembles her repeatedly show up in Roberta's artwork. She learns that this girl is her boss's missing daughter Maddy.

As she delves into the mystery of the missing girl, a new persona begins to emerge within her. Becoming aware of her unwinding nature, Judith must decide between staying on in her job or continuing down the rabbit hole and risking losing who she is.

== Cast ==
- Sorcha Groundsell as Judith
- Victoria Lidelle as Roberta Roslyn
- Scarlett Mack as Anne-Marie
- Margaret Fraser as Dawn
- Lynsey-Anna Moffat as Suzy
- Adrienne-Marie Zitt as Penelope Sade

== Development ==
McPhee shot the film in multiple formats, which included "35mm, 16mm, 8mm, home processing, Betamax, Pixelvision and Red. All with no VFX being used." He has described Far From the Apple Tree as a "Pop-Art fairytale", likening it to The Owl Service or The Stone Tape. McPhee also cited Redemption's VHS releases such as Valerie and Her Week of Wonders as a major influence on the film.

The decision was made to work completely independently as opposed to seeking out outside funding, to "do something that exec producers and financiers would likely never fund".

== Release ==
Far From the Apple Tree premiered at the Manchester Film Festival in March 2019, after which it received a cinematic run at the DCA in May of the same year. In 2020 Far From the Apple Tree was released to DVD in the United Kingdom and United States through Redemption Films and Kino Lorber, respectively.

The soundtrack music to the film was written, performed, and produced by Rose McDowall and Shawn Pinchbeck, and was released on vinyl through Glass Modern Records.

The BFI released and distributed Far From the Apple Tree on their BFI player platform and Amazon.

== Reception ==
Eye for Film gave the film 4.5/5 stating: "An excellent piece of work. No doubt some viewers will be turned off by its unwillingness to compromise for the sake of accessibility, but others will fall in love." Nerdly was less favorable in their review, rating it 2/5 and writing that "Ultimately, Far From The Apple Tree is a case of style over substance, except the style is just as disappointing as the substance. There’s no shortage of ideas here, it’s just that they never coalesce in a satisfactory manner, leaving the film devoid of tension and chills, despite its suitably creepy premise."

The film was also positively reviewed by Horrified Magazine and Warped Perspective.

In 2023, the British Film Institute listed the film as one of their Great British Horror Films.
