= Ingunn Beate Øyen =

Norwegian actress (born 1968)

- Born: 30 August 1968; Inderøy Municipality
- Alma mater: Norwegian National Academy of Theatre
- Occupation: Actor
- Awards: The Hedda Award for Best Actress (2006)

Ingunn Beate Øyen (born 30 August 1968) is a Norwegian actress. For her stage work she has won one Hedda Award.

== Career ==
Øyen hails from Inderøy Municipality and graduated from the National Academy of Theatre in 1992. She was immediately employed at Det Norske Teatret. While her debut role was Cathrine in Arthur Miller's A View from the Bridge, her breakthrough came as Jeanne d'Arc in Jean Anouilh's The Lark in 1995. Her role in Richard II which premiered in 2005 earned her the Hedda Award for best female lead in 2006.

Øyen's film roles include Tatt av kvinnen (2007), The Kautokeino Rebellion (2008) and Kvinner i for store herreskjorter (2015), whereas her television credits include Goodnight Darling (2009), Kampen for tilværelsen (2014–2015), Norsemen (2016), The Innocents (2018), Beforeigners (2019) and Stolthet og forfall (2021).

Awards
Preceded by category established	Hedda Award for Best Actress; 2006	Succeeded by Birgitte Larsen
