= Postcards from Scotland =

2024 book

- Author: Grant McPhee
- Language: English
- Genre: Music
- Publisher: Omnibus Press
- Publication date: 20 June 2024
- Publication place: United Kingdom
- Media type: Print (hardback)
- Pages: 496
- ISBN: 9781913172473

Postcards from Scotland is a 2024 book by Scottish film director Grant McPhee that covers Scotland's 1980's and 1990's independent music scene. It focuses on the stories of The Pastels, Shop Assistants, The Jesus and Mary Chain, Primal Scream, The Soup Dragons, BMX Bandits, The Vaselines, Eugenius, Jesse Garon and the Desperadoes, Finitribe, The Motorcycle Boy, The Big Gun, and Rote Kapelle.

The book was launched with two live events featuring a ‘supergroup’ made up of members of Shop Assistants, BMX Bandits, Fizzbombs, Rote Kapelle and Jesse Garon and the Desperadoes while being backed by The Cords.

A second volume has been completed and will be released by Omnibus books. This volume tells an alternative story of Scotland's Underground Music scene during a similar time-frame, featuring Dawson, Badgewearer, Stretcheads, The Yummy Fur, Lung Leg, Mogwai, Bis, Chemikal Underground, The Delgadoes, Belle and Sebastian, Arab Strap and Franz Ferdinand.

== Reception ==
Postcards from Scotland received positive reviews from critics. Product Magazine's Alistair Braidwood said the book is "as close to an essential read as I can imagine." According to The Big Issue, the book is a "definitive account of a seminal period in pop history", while calling it "a labour of love, it's sometimes funny, sometimes bittersweet tribute." Louder Than War's Iain Key called it a "compelling and dynamic oral history".
