= Meat Whiplash =

- Origin: East Kilbride, Scotland
- Genres: Noise pop; post-punk
- Years active: 1985-1987
- Labels: Creation Records
- Past members: Paul McDermott; Stephen McLean; Michael Kerr; Edward Connelly

Meat Whiplash were an alternative rock band from East Kilbride, Scotland, that were amongst the first to be signed to Creation Records.

The line-up was Paul McDermott (vocals), Stephen McLean (guitar), Edward Connelly (bass guitar) and Michael Kerr (drums). They took their name from a B-side track by The Fire Engines. They then became The Motorcycle Boy when female singer Alex Taylor (of Shop Assistants) joined the group in 1987.

== Record store ==
"Meat Whiplash" was also the name of a mid-80s independent record store in Plymouth, Devon, run by Jeff Barrett, who later worked as a press officer for Creation Records and then founded Heavenly Records. After a concert in the city by The Jesus and Mary Chain, the store acquired a second sign and also became known as "Bobby Gillespie's".

== Discography ==
They only had one record released, "Don't Slip Up", which spent 19 weeks in the UK's independent music chart, where it reached the No. 3 position following its release on 14 September 1985 as a 7" single, (which had a sleeve featuring actor Robert Vaughn, printed up by Bobby Gillespie and hand-folded by their record label's owner, Alan McGee).

They are notorious for being the opening group at The Jesus and Mary Chain's infamous "riot gig" at the North London Polytechnic on 15 March 1985, where they threw a wine bottle into the crowd and were, according to The Jasmine Minks, the next group due to play, then were beaten-up on-stage by members of the audience who later rioted when the controversial main act performed. They also had a session in the Maida Vale studios for John Peel's show on BBC Radio 1 on 15 October that same year.

In 2024 Silver Girl Records released the 2 CD/ double album compilation Collected/Contextualised consisting of their only Creation Records release, a John Peel session, demos and live tracks on one disc and another containing cover versions.
