= Shop Assistants (album) =

Studio album by Shop Assistants
- Released: November 1986
- Recorded: August 1986
- Studio: Hart Street, Edinburgh
- Genre: Indie pop, noise pop
- Label: Blue Guitar
- Producer: Mayo Thompson, John Ryan, Shop Assistants

Professional ratings
Review scores
Source	Rating
AllMusic	5/5 stars
The Encyclopedia of Popular Music	3/5 stars
Martin C. Strong	6/10

Shop Assistants is the only album released by Shop Assistants. It was released in November 1986 on the Chrysalis Records "indie" offshoot Blue Guitar. It spent one week on the UK albums chart at number 100 in November 1986. The album was critically acclaimed by Sounds staff who put Shop Assistants on the list of top 50 best albums of 1986. It was ranked the 47th best album of 1986 on NME's end-of-year critics' list.

The album was reissued in 1997 by Overground Records under the title Will Anything Happen, and again on CD by Cherry Red in 2008 with two bonus tracks, both of which had originally appeared on the B-side of the single "I Don't Wanna Be Friends With You". The album was described by AllMusic's Jason Ankeny as "an essential artefact of its times".

== Track listing ==
All tracks composed by Shop Assistants; except where noted.

1. "I Don't Wanna Be Friends With You" - 2:18
2. "All Day Long" - 1:50
3. "Before I Wake" - 2:42
4. "Caledonian Road" - 2:13
5. "All That Ever Mattered" - 2:15
6. "Fixed Grin" - 2:51
7. "Somewhere in China" - 3:13
8. "Train from Kansas City" (Ellie Greenwich, Jeff Barry) - 3:42
9. "Home Again" - 1:41
10. "Seems to Be" - 2:22
11. "After Dark" - 2:36
12. "All of the Time" - 2:23
13. "What a Way to Die" (David Leone - uncredited) - 1:59
14. "Nature Lover" - 1:55
15. "Looking Back" (CD reissue only) - 1:45
16. "All Day Long" (slow version) (CD reissue only) - 2:27

"What a Way to Die" was credited to "unknown", but it is a cover of David Leone's small hit for Pleasure Seekers.

== Personnel ==
Shop Assistants

- Alex Taylor - lead vocals, tambourine
- David Keegan - guitar, noises
- Sarah Kneale - bass guitar, backing vocals, lead vocals on "What a Day to Die"
- Laura MacPhail - drums, glockenspiel

with:

- Jon Hunter - trumpet on "All of the Time" and "Nature Lover"

Technical

- Graeme Hughes, Sean, Stephen Street - engineer
