= Rote Kapelle (band) =

Post-punk/indie pop band

Background information
- Origin: Edinburgh, Scotland
- Genres: Post-punk, indie pop
- Years active: Early 1980s–1988
- Labels: In-Tape
- Past members: Andrew Tully; Margarita Vasquez-Ponte; Chris Henman; Ian Binns; Malcolm Kergan; Jonathan Muir

Rote Kapelle were a post-punk/indie pop band from Edinburgh, Scotland, active during the 1980s. Its band members included musicians who were also members of Jesse Garon and the Desperadoes and The Shop Assistants.

== History ==
The band was formed in the early 1980s by Andrew Tully (vocals) and Marguerite Vasquez-Ponte (vocals), both of whom would also form Jesse Garon and the Desperadoes, with Chris Henman (guitar), Ian Binns (keyboards, also a member of The Stayrcase), Malcolm Kergan (bass, also a member of The Thanes), and Jonathan Muir (drums). The band's debut release was The Big Smell Dinosaur EP in late 1985, after which they were signed by Marc Riley's In-Tape label. Tully described the band's sound in 1987 as a blend of noisy post-punk and anorak pop. Vasquez-Ponte was also a member of a third band, The Fizzbombs, alongside the Desperadoes' Angus McPake and The Shop Assistants' former drummer Ann Donald. They released two further singles and two more EP's, one of which featured tracks from their Peel Session, before splitting when Vasquez-Ponte joined the re-formed Shop Assistants. An LP, No North Briton, was released in 1990.

The band features in the book Postcards from Scotland detailing the 1980s and 1990s independent music scene in Scotland.

== Discography ==
- The Big Smell Dinosaur 7-inch EP (1985) Big Smell Dinosaur
- "These Animals are Dangeroos" 7-inch (1986) In-Tape
- It Moves But Does It Swing? 12-inch EP (John Peel Sessions) EP (1987) In-Tape
- "Fire Escape" 7-inch (1988) In-Tape
- San Francisco Again 12-inch EP (1988) In-Tape
- No North Briton LP (1990) In-Tape
