= The Flatmates =

British indie pop band

- Origin: Bristol
- Genre: Indie pop
- Years active: 1985–1989; 2013–present
- Labels: The Subway Organization; Archdeacon of Pop
- Members: Lisa Bouvier; Martin Whitehead; Rocker; Mattias Liddehall; Jamie Hill
- Past members: Kath Beach; Jackie Carrera; Sarah Fletcher; Debbie Haynes; Joel O'Bierne; Verity Longley; Brian Price; Tim Rippington
- Website: facebook.com/TheFlatmatesOfficial

The Flatmates, part of the mid-1980s British indie pop boom, were part of The Subway Organization, a Bristol record label formed by Martin Whitehead. Whitehead is also guitarist and main songwriter for the band.

== History ==
Following the group's formation in 1985, singles such as "I Could Be in Heaven", "Happy All the Time" and "Shimmer" established the band as a successful indie band but The Flatmates disbanded in April 1989 before releasing a proper studio album.

The group's core members were Martin Whitehead (guitar) and Debbie Haynes (vocals). Initially, the band also included Kath Beach (bass guitar) and Rocker (drums). Prior to recording their first single, Beach left the band and was replaced by Sarah Fletcher.

The line-up of Haynes, Whitehead, Fletcher and Rocker recorded the first two Flatmates singles, 1986's "I Could Be in Heaven" and 1987's "Happy All the Time", both Whitehead compositions. Rocker left the band prior to their third single, November 1987's "You're Gonna Cry", and was replaced by Joel O'Bierne. Ironically, "You're Gonna Cry" was a Rocker composition, the only A-side he would pen for the band.

"Shimmer", released in March 1988 as the fourth Flatmates single, was the band's biggest hit, produced by Chris Allison reaching No. 2 on the UK Indie Chart. Shortly after the single was released, Tim Rippington was added as a second guitarist. Bassist Fletcher then left The Flatmates prior to their fifth and final single "Heaven Knows". She was eventually replaced by Jackie Carrera; however it was Whitehead who played bass on "Heaven Knows", while Rippington handled all the guitar.

The group split up in 1989, with Carrera joining The Caretaker Race and Whitehead and O'Bierne forming The Sweet Young Things. Whitehead later formed the short-lived band Shrimptractor in 1992.

Two collections of Flatmates material have been released on CD, Love and Death (1989) and Potpourri (Hits, Mixes and Demos '85 - '89) (2005).

The group were reformed by Whitehead in 2013, featuring Lisa Bouvier on vocals, and released a single called "You Held My Heart" on Archdeacon of Pop Records. In August 2015, Bristol-based indie label Local Underground released a second new Flatmates single, featuring covers of "When You Were Mine" by Prince, and "Comedian" (originally titled "Comedienne") by Cinerama. The band's first full studio album, The Flatmates was released in March 2020.

== Discography ==
=== Albums ===
- The Flatmates (2020)

=== Compilation albums ===
- Love and Death (1989)
- Potpourri (Hits, Mixes and Demos '85 - '89) (2005)

=== Singles ===
Month	Year	Title	UK Indie Chart position
October	1986	"I Could Be in Heaven"	No. 18
April	1987	"Happy All the Time"	No. 3
November	1987	"You're Gonna Cry"	No. 5
March	1988	"Shimmer"	No. 2
May	1988	"Janice Long Sessions"	No. 2
October	1988	"Heaven Knows"	No. 10
September	2013	"You Held My Heart"	
August	2015	"When You Were Mine" / "Comedian" ("Comedienne")	
September	2019	"Shut Up and Kiss Me" / "Rescue Me"	
