= Sorcha Groundsell =

British actress (born 1998)

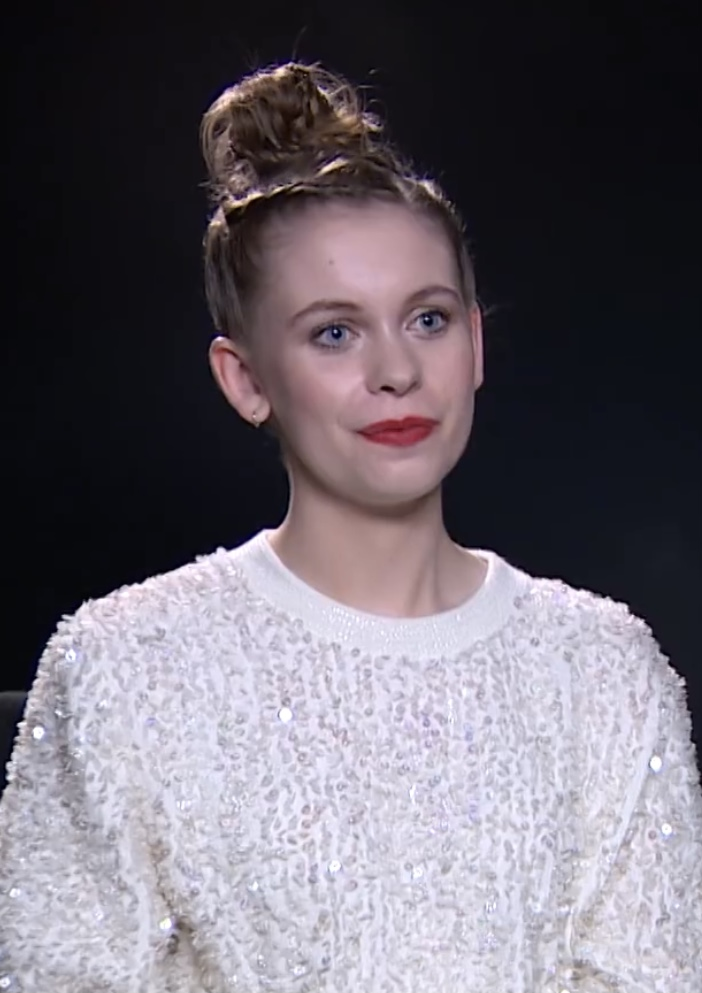
- Groundsell in 2018
- Born: Sorcha Mary Groundsell; 15 February 1998 (age 28); Bristol, England
- Education: Glasgow Gaelic School
- Occupation: Actress
- Years active: 2014–present

Sorcha Mary Groundsell (born 15 February 1998) is a British actress. On television, she starred in the Netflix series The Innocents (2018) and the BBC Alba series An t-Eilean (2025). Her films include Far From the Apple Tree (2018).

== Early life ==
Groundsell was born in Bristol, England and grew up in Ness on the Isle of Lewis in the Outer Hebrides until she was nine. Her father was a graphic designer, and her mother worked in marketing. A fluent Scottish Gaelic speaker, Groundsell attended the Glasgow Gaelic School upon moving to the city. She took drama classes at the Citizens Theatre and later the Royal Conservatoire of Scotland. She left school at 16 to pursue acting as a career and moved to London at 18.

== Career ==
In 2015, Groundsell made her feature film and stage debuts as Sarah in Iona and Amy in Stain, respectively, at the Edinburgh Fringe Festival. She received an RTS Award nomination for her role in Sleeping Lions. The following year, she starred as Jane Muncie in the ITV true crime miniseries In Plain Sight.

Groundsell played Elizabeth Smith in the first series of the BBC Three thriller Clique. In 2018, Groundsell starred in leading fantasy roles in the Netflix series The Innocents as well as the independent film Far from the Apple Tree. She appeared in the 2019 Yard Theatre production of The Crucible, the two-parter Thanks for the Memories, made a guest appearance in Grantchester, and had a recurring role in the BritBox adaptation of Irvine Welsh's Crime.

In 2022, Groundsell appeared in series three of the BBC One and HBO adaptation of His Dark Materials and the seventh series of Shetland, also on BBC One.

In 2025, she played family liaison officer Kat Crichton in the Scottish-Gaelic language crime series An t-Eilean.

== Filmography ==
=== Film ===
Year	Title	Role	Notes
2014	The Scribbler	Anna	
2015	Iona	Sarah	
2018	Skipper	Matilda	Short film
2018	Sunday Tide	Sunday	Short film
2018	Far from the Apple Tree	Judith	
2019	The Trap	Emily	Short film
2020	Portrait	Rhetta	Short film
2020	Voce	Chiara	Short film
2020	Upstairs	Jennifer	Short film
2021	A Sunday in Portsmouth	Matilda	Short film

=== Television ===
Year	Title	Role	Notes
2015	Sleeping Lions	Mia	Television short
2016	In Plain Sight	Jane Muncie	Miniseries
2017	Clique	Elizabeth Smith	Series 1
2018	The Innocents	June McDaniel	Main role
2019	Thanks for the Memories	Bella Beckmann	Miniseries
2020	Grantchester	Vronky	1 episode
2021	Crime	Carly McCargill	4 episodes
2022	Shetland	Bryd Fleming	3 episodes
2022	His Dark Materials	Maddy	3 episodes
2023	The Long Shadow	Nicola Briggs	3 episodes
2025	An t-Eilean	Kat Crichton	Lead role
2026	Bookish	Geraldine Mercer	2 episodes
2026	Outlander: Blood of My Blood	Murdina Bug	season 2

=== Web ===
Year	Title	Role	Notes
2017	All of Them	Nora	Episode: "Nora"

=== Video games ===
Year	Title	Role	Notes
2022	Xenoblade Chronicles 3	Miyabi	English dub
2022	The Diofield Chronicle	Waltaquin Redditch	English dub

== Stage ==
Year	Title	Role	Notes
2015	Stain	Amy	Edinburgh Fringe Festival
2019	The Crucible	Mary Warren	The Yard Theatre, London

== Awards and nominations ==
Year	Award	Category	Work	Result	Ref
2015	RTS North West Awards	Best Performance in a Single Drama	Sleeping Lions	Nominated	
2019	Toronto International Spring of Horror & Fantasy Film Festival	Best Performance	Far from the Apple Tree	Won	
