= Safety Net =

Single by Shop Assistants
- B-side: "Almost Made It"; "Somewhere in China"
- Released: February 1986
- Recorded: 24–25 October 1985, Pier House, Edinburgh
- Genre: Indie pop, noise pop
- Label: 53rd & 3rd

Shop Assistants singles chronology
"All Day Long" (1985)	"Safety Net" (1986)	"I Don't Wanna Be Friends With You" (1986)

"Safety Net" is a song by Shop Assistants which was recorded in 1985 and released as a single in 1986.

== Recordings ==
The song was first recorded for the band's first session for John Peel's BBC Radio 1 show on 8 October 1985. It was recorded for release on 24 and 25 October 1985 at Pier House, Edinburgh, and released as a single on guitarist David Keegan and Stephen Pastel's 53rd & 3rd Records in February 1986, the first release on the label.

== Charts and reception ==
The single reached number two on the UK Independent Chart, spending seventeen weeks in the chart in total. The song was voted to number eight on the 1986 Festive Fifty, with only tracks by The Smiths, Primal Scream, The Fall and "Kiss" by Age of Chance receiving more votes. "Safety Net" was described by David Sheridan of Trouser Press as "nothing short of brilliant". Gillian Watson of The Scotsman called the song an "early classic", which "captures how nervous and exciting it feels to be a young adult in the city at night".

== Track listing ==
Side A:

- "Safety Net"

Side B:

- "Almost Made It"
- "Somewhere in China"

== Personnel ==
- Alex Taylor - vocals
- David Keegan - guitar
- Sarah Kneale - bass
- Laura MacPhail - drums, glockenspiel
- Ann Donald - drums
- Sleeve: Stephen Pastel & Shop Assistants
- Shop Assistants photos: Karen Parker
