= Wigilia (film) =

- Directed by: Graham Drysdale
- Written by: Graham Drysdale; Iwona Glowinska; Duglas T. Stewart
- Produced by: Grant McPhee; Steven Moore; Graham Drysdale
- Starring: Iwona Glowinska; Duglas T. Stewart
- Cinematography: Grant McPhee
- Edited by: Shaun Glowa
- Distributed by: Tartan Features
- Release date: December 24, 2014
- Running time: 71 minutes
- Country: Scotland
- Language: English

Wigilia is a 2014 drama film directed by Graham Drysdale and starring Iwona Glowinska and Duglas T. Stewart. It centres on a traditional Polish Christmas Eve wigilia supper shared in Glasgow by its two main characters, Agata and Robbie. The film is Drysdale's debut feature.

== Plot ==
Agata, a Polish woman alone in Glasgow at Christmas time, sets out a wigilia supper in her boss's empty house, complete with the traditional extra place setting for a wondering pilgrim. Unbeknown to her, Robbie, her boss's brother, has decided to stop by for a few days, thinking he'd be alone. Robbie takes up the place of the wondering pilgrim at the table and the pair share the meal, not knowing the impact their encounter would have on each of their lives.

== Production ==
Wigilia came about after the film's producer challenged Drysdale to come up with a story for a film that could be shot in the space of five days, although the film was completed over six and a half. The latter scenes of the film were shot a year after the Polish wigilia scenes, mirroring the year between the meetings of Agata and Robbie.

Much of the film's dialogue was improvised by Glowinska and Stewart.

== Cast ==
Drysdale has said that he used the backgrounds of the two main actors - Glowinska is Polish and Stewart from Glasgow - to further the character development in the film: "The actors added a huge amount to the story and their characters. We talked a lot about their backgrounds – what had brought them here and how they would react to various situations."

The part of Robbie was written with Stewart in mind, with Drysdale drawing on Stewart's musical background in a scene where he breaks into song.

== Music ==
The film is scored by Jim Harbourne and features an original composition - Agata's Song - by Stewart and Norman Blake of Teenage Fanclub.
