= Black Tambourine (album) =

Compilation album by Black Tambourine
- Released: March 30, 2010
- Recorded: 1989–June 2009
- Genres: Indie pop; noise pop
- Label: Slumberland

Black Tambourine chronology
Complete Recordings (1999)	Black Tambourine (2010)	Black Tambourine Cassette (2010)

Professional ratings
Aggregate scores
Source	Rating
Metacritic	88/100
Review scores
Source	Rating
AllMusic	4.5/5 stars
The Austin Chronicle	3/5 stars
musicOMH	4.5/5 stars
Paste	7.3/10
Pitchfork	8.3/10
PopMatters	9/10
Tom Hull	B+

Black Tambourine is a compilation album by American indie pop band Black Tambourine. The album was released in 2010 by Slumberland Records and contains the band's complete recordings up to that point, serving to replace the prior 1999 compilation Complete Recordings. Black Tambourine features six additional previously unreleased tracks, including four new songs recorded in June 2009 specifically for the album.

== Reception ==
Metacritic rates the album as an 88/100. AllMusic reviewer Ned Raggett gave the album a 4.5/5 and said that "hearing songs like the beautiful "For Ex-Lovers Only," "I Was Wrong," and "Pack You Up" again—with their feedback as hooks, rumbling rhythms, and heavily reverbed (sic) yet still strongly sung ruminations on life and love—is its own treat" and says that "it's the six extras that receive the focus of attention on this disc".

== Track listing ==
All tracks are written by Black Tambourine (Pam Berry, Archie Moore, Brian Nelson and Mike Schulman), except where noted.

No.	Title	Writer(s)	Length
1.	"For Ex-Lovers Only"		2:40
2.	"Black Car"		3:27
3.	"Pack You Up"		2:25
4.	"Can't Explain"	Johnny Echols; John Fleckenstein; Arthur Lee	2:23
5.	"I Was Wrong"		1:34
6.	"Throw Aggi Off the Bridge"		3:16
7.	"Drown"		2:42
8.	"We Can't Be Friends"		1:48
9.	"By Tomorrow"		3:04
10.	"Pam's Tan"		1:19
11.	"For Ex-Lovers Only" (first demo)		2:43
12.	"Throw Aggi Off the Bridge" (first demo)		3:32
13.	"Heartbeat"	Bob Montgomery; Norman Petty	1:41
14.	"Lazy Heart"		3:03
15.	"Tears of Joy"		1:27
16.	"Dream Baby Dream"	Martin Rev; Alan Vega	3:56
