= Finlay Macdonald =

Finlay Macdonald or Finlay MacDonald may refer to:

- Finlay Macdonald (minister) (born 1945), Moderator of the General Assembly of the Church of Scotland
- Finlay MacDonald (musician) (born 1978), Scottish bagpiper
- Finlay MacDonald (politician, born 1866) (died 1948), Canadian Member of Parliament for Cape Breton South, Nova Scotia
- Finlay MacDonald (politician, born 1923) (died 2002), Canadian senator
- Finlay Macdonald (editor) (born 1961) from New Zealand
- Finlay MacDonald (Teenage Fanclub), Scottish rock musician
- Finlay J. MacDonald (1925–1987), Scottish journalist and radio and television producer and writer
