= The Innocents (TV series) =

British television series

- Genre: Supernatural; Drama; Horror
- Created by: Simon Duric; Hania Elkington
- Starring: Sorcha Groundsell; Percelle Ascott; Sam Hazeldine; Nadine Marshall; Jóhannes Haukur Jóhannesson; Laura Birn; Ingunn Beate Øyen; Arthur Hughes; Guy Pearce
- Composer: Carly Paradis
- Country of origin: United Kingdom
- Original language: English
- No. of seasons: 1
- No. of episodes: 8

Production
- Executive producers: Elaine Pyke; Charlie Pattinson; Farren Blackburn; Simon Duric; Hania Elkington
- Producer: Chris Croucher
- Production locations: England; Norway
- Cinematography: David Procter
- Editor: Matthew Cannings
- Running time: 45–55 minutes
- Production company: New Pictures

Original release
- Network: Netflix
- Release: 24 August 2018

The Innocents is a British supernatural television series created by Hania Elkington and Simon Duric. The series premiered on 24 August 2018 on Netflix.

== Premise ==
Two teenagers, June and Harry, run away together. However, June starts displaying abilities that throw them down a dangerous path.

== Cast ==
=== Main ===
- Sorcha Groundsell as June McDaniel, a teenager with supernatural, shapeshifting abilities known as a "shifter"
- Percelle Ascott as Harry Polk, June's boyfriend, who runs away with her
- Sam Hazeldine as John McDaniel, June's stern, overprotective step-father
- Nadine Marshall as Christine Polk, Harry's mother and a police officer
- Jóhannes Haukur Jóhannesson as Steinar, Halvorson's troubled right-hand man
- Laura Birn as Elena Askeland, June's mother and a shifter who struggles to control her power.
- Ingunn Beate Øyen as Runa Gundersen, Halvorson's wife and patient, who is suffering from the early onset of dementia
- Arthur Hughes as Ryan McDaniel, June's physically disabled older brother
- Guy Pearce as Bendik "Ben" Halvorson, a man who treats shifters at Sanctum

=== Recurring ===
- Jason Done as DCI Doug Squirries, Christine's boss whom she is at odds with.
- Lise Risom Olsen as Sigrid Vollen, a patient of Halvorson who can now control her shifting abilities.
- Philip Wright as Lewis Polk, Harry's father, who was left mentally disabled as a result of Elena shifting into him and then directly into another body.
- Abigail Hardingham as Kam, also known as Freya Gundersen, a shifter whom June and Harry come into contact with. The daughter of Runa, she fled from Sanctum when she was younger.
- Trond Fausa Aurvåg as Alf, a private investigator and high school friend of Steinar, who agrees to help Steinar locate and capture June until things get out of control.
- Andrew Koji as Andrew, Kam's boyfriend.

== Episodes ==
No.	Title	Directed by	Written by	Original release date
1	"The Start of Us"	Farren Blackburn	Hania Elkington	24 August 2018
Teenagers June (Sorcha Groundsell) and Harry (Percelle Ascott) skip town together, seeking escape from their troubled home lives. Just as they start a new life on the road, they are confronted by Steinar (Jóhannes Haukur Jóhannesson), a dangerous man claiming to be sent by June's missing mother, and events take a terrifying turn.
2	"Keep Calm, Come to No Harm"	Farren Blackburn	Simon Duric	24 August 2018
June and Harry try to make sense of her remarkable but terrifying power, and head to London to escape various forces trying to track them down. Harry's mother Christine (Nadine Marshall) and June's adoptive father John (Sam Hazeldine) join forces to find their children. In remote Scandinavia, June's mother Elena (Laura Birn) is subject to Dr Halvorson's (Guy Pearce) terrifying experiments in hope of curing her shifting.
3	"Bubblegum & Bleach"	Farren Blackburn	Hania Elkington	24 August 2018
Homeless in the capital, June and Harry befriend Shane (Andrew-Lee Potts), a friendly stranger who employs them to sell drugs on the London club circuit. However, June experiences another terrifying shift which leaves both the teens spinning. Steinar begins trailing John and Ryan (Arthur Hughes) when they arrive in the city.
4	"Deborah"	Farren Blackburn	Hania Elkington	24 August 2018
June shifts into a pregnant nurse, Deborah (Clare Calbraith), just as John, Ryan and Steinar close in on her. Tensions rise at Sanctum when Runa (Ingunn Beate Øyen) discovers that Elena wants to stay with Halvorson permanently.
5	"Passionate Amateur"	Jamie Donoughue	Simon Duric, Hania Elkington & Stacey Gregg	24 August 2018
The runaways are contacted by Kam (Abigail Hardingham), an alluring shifter living in London, but whilst June is enthralled by her, Harry soon feels outcast. Christine realises that the McDaniels are connected to the 'Pennines Five', an unsolved case that had a catastrophic impact on Harry's father Lewis (Philip Wright).
6	"Not the Only Freak in Town"	Jamie Donoughue	Corinna Faith	24 August 2018
Harry returns to the Pennines, where Christine exposes John McDaniels' guilt over Lewis' catatonia. Kam's behaviour pushes June into Halvorson's grasp, and she agrees to travel to Sanctum with him. Steinar is cut off by Halvorson, but he takes action when he encounters a face from his past.
7	"Will You Take Me Too?"	Farren Blackburn	Hania Elkington	24 August 2018
June and Halvorson journey to Norway, but June's reunion with her mother has potentially devastating consequences. Harry and John are close on their heels, but receive a hostile welcome from the women at Sanctum. Christine and DCI Squirries (Jason Done) track Harry to Bergen, while Steinar also makes his way to the fjords for an almighty showdown.
8	"Everything. Anything."	Farren Blackburn	Simon Duric	24 August 2018
Halvorson takes action to stop Harry from taking June away from Sanctum. Steinar's arrival sets off a devastating chain of events, and Harry and June risk everything to be together.

== Production ==
The series was ordered by Netflix in August 2017. In February 2018, the title was announced, alongside the news that the series would be shot mainly in England (mostly Skipton) and Norway. Carly Paradis composes music for the show.
