= BMX Bandits (band) =

Scottish pop rock band

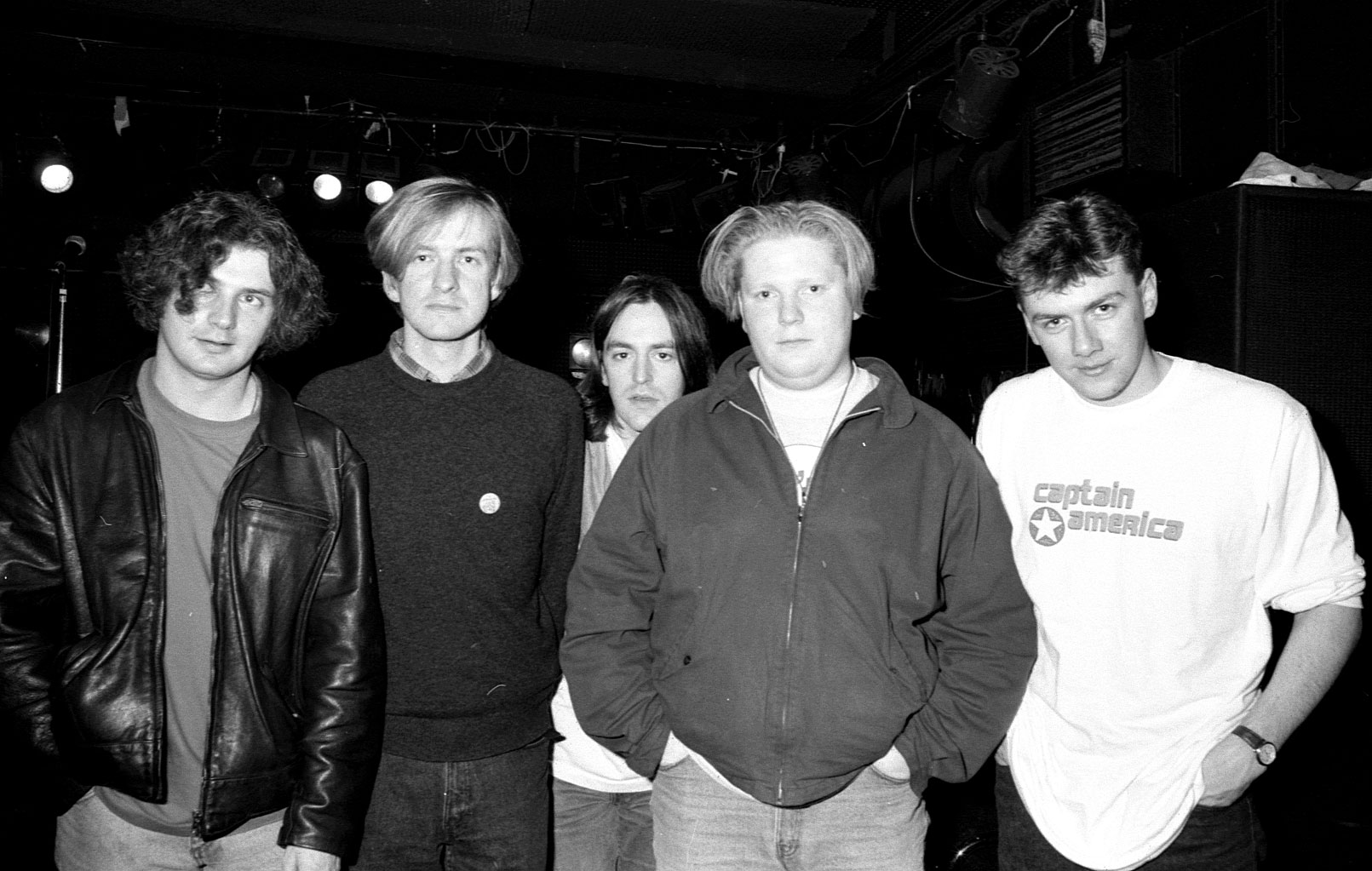
- BMX Bandits in Tokyo, 1991

Background information
- Origin: Bellshill, North Lanarkshire, Scotland
- Genres: Indie rock, indie pop
- Years active: 1985–present
- Labels: 53rd & 3rd, Creation, Elefant Records, Tapete Records, Last Night From Glasgow, Vinyl Japan
- Members: Duglas T. Stewart; Rory Haye
- Past members: Rachel Allison; Norman Blake; Jamie Cameron; Sushil K. Dade; Sean Dickson; John Hogarty; Gordon Keen; Eugene Kelly; Gareth Perrie; Martin Kirwan; Francis MacDonald; Joseph McAlinden; Willie McArdle; Brian McEwan; James McEwan; Eden McNulty; Billy Wood; David Scott; Gabriel Telerman; Jamie Gash; Finlay MacDonald; Jim McCulloch; Paul Kelly; Stuart Kidd; Chloe Philip; Liam Chapman; Amanda Nizic; Andrew Pattie; Lawrence Kim

BMX Bandits are a Scottish guitar pop band formed in Bellshill in 1985. Led by songwriter and lead vocalist Duglas T. Stewart, their music is heavily influenced by 1960s pop and European composers such as Serge Gainsbourg, Ennio Morricone and Michel Legrand. They have shared members with numerous other local bands, including Teenage Fanclub and the Soup Dragons. BMX Bandits were a favourite band of Kurt Cobain, who said "If I could be in any other band, it would be BMX Bandits". In 2011, they were the subject of the documentary Serious Drugs: A Film About BMX Bandits.

== History ==
BMX Bandits were formed in Bellshill by songwriter and lead vocalist Duglas T. Stewart from the remnants of The Pretty Flowers, a group that featured Stewart alongside Frances McKee (later of The Vaselines), Sean Dickson and Norman Blake. Beginning around 1982/1983, this early version of the band would perform impromptu, happening-style gigs at various locations around Bellshill including local parks, their school and the Hattonrigg Hotel. Before settling on the name The Pretty Flowers, they usually performed under various controversial and outrageous names to attract attention. The material they performed was often improvised or based loosely on other songs. The group would also partake in various other activities to amuse themselves, such as making home videos interviewing themselves as well as members of the public and recording albums of music in one night on home tape recorders. By 1985, McKee had left to start The Vaselines with Eugene Kelly and the group began to morph into the BMX Bandits. The style of the group as a collective of musicians has been present since its early days, with Stewart acting as the leader while the line-up constantly fluctuates. Many notable independent Glasgow musicians have passed through the band over the years and often continue to contribute to BMX Bandits recordings.

The band signed to 53rd & 3rd and released their first single during the first half of 1986; "E102" / "Sad?". Both songs were written by Stewart with Sean Dickson, who played guitar and keyboards on the recording alongside his Soup Dragons bandmate Jim McCulloch. The band's cheerful and playful sound, inspired by 1960s pop music along with Duglas T. Stewart's sense of humour was unusual in rock music at the time and caused mixed responses. However, Radio 1 DJ Janice Long was an early supporter of the group; regularly playing their single and asking them to record a session for her show. They followed up "E102" that same year with a cover of "What a Wonderful World", backed with "The Day Before Tomorrow", which has since become a staple of their live sets. By the end of the year, Dickson left to focus on The Soup Dragons. During the following year, Norman Blake and Joe McAlinden became more involved, with Blake contributing guitar, keyboards and songwriting and McAlinden primarily playing bass and violin. In 1988, the band released another 4-song EP and made a television appearance on the BBC Scotland music show Full Scale Deflection on the same episode as Primal Scream. Their set included a cover of the Beastie Boys song "(You Gotta) Fight for Your Right (To Party!)" and Norman Blake dressed up as an old man with a false moustache.

In 1989, the band released their first LPs. The first to be released was the live album Totally Groovy Live Experience on Avalanche Records, which documents a show from the Hattonrigg Hotel on 4 January 1989. This was followed by their first studio album C86; titled as such in reference to the group being unfairly pigeonholed by the music press as a C86-era leftover. The album features more of the band's staples, including "Disco Girl", "Your Class", "Whirlpool" and "Right Across the Street". The album was given expanded re-releases in both 1992 and 1996, each time with more bonus tracks.

Their songs mix melodic qualities and humour with, at times, raw and heartbreaking pathos. Stewart has written many of the group's works solo including "Your Class", "The Sailor's Song" and "Doorways" but also has collaborated with many of the other members. Stewart's most regular songwriting partners have been Francis MacDonald, Norman Blake and, more recently, David Scott of The Pearlfishers, Stuart Kidd and Andrew Pattie.

One of the group's most notable songs is the autobiographical "Serious Drugs", recorded in 1991 but not released until 1993. The song featured in the movie This Year's Love and was covered by American stadium power pop group Gigolo Aunts. Oasis did their first UK tour dates supporting the Bandits as a favour from Stewart to Creation label boss Alan McGee. BMX Bandits admirers included Kurt Cobain, who was photographed wearing a BMX Bandits T-shirt. Cobain claimed on a New York radio show that if he could be in any band it would be BMX Bandits.

Stewart split with long term musical partner Francis Macdonald in 2005 but 2006 saw a new wave of live concert activity and the release of My Chain. Stewart's writing on the album was compared to Brian Wilson, Michel Legrand, Ennio Morricone and even Alan Bennett. The line up was expanded by the arrival of Stewart's friend David Scott and new female vocalist Rachel Mackenzie (now Rachel Allison).

The follow-up, 2007's Bee Stings, was influenced by classic girl group pop plus the mellow A & M sound of the late 1960s and early 1970s. Bee Stings features Allison singing lead on half the tracks including "Our Secret Life" co-written by Allison and former band member Norman Blake.

A feature-length documentary called Serious Drugs – Duglas and the Music of BMX Bandits premiered at Glasgow Film Theatre as part of Glasgow Popfest 2011. Jim Burns, the producer/director, initially targeted film and music festivals before releasing a DVD/Blu-ray version of the film.

Original group member Jim McCulloch re-joined the group and was Stewart's major writing partner on the next album release. BMX Bandits in Space was released on Elefant Records in 2012. The album also featured contributions from original BMX Bandit member Sean Dickson, Argentinian multi-instrumentalist Cineplexx and Japanese rock group Plectrum. Shortly after the album's release Rachel Allison departed the group. Chloe Philip, also a member of pop group TeenCanteen, joined in 2013 providing vocals, flute and keyboards. "BMX Bandits Forever" the group's tenth studio album was released by Elefant Records in May 2017. Stewart's main writing partner on this album was Stuart Kidd who rejoined the group in 2014. The album also contain a collaboration with Brian Jonestown Massacre leader Anton Newcombe. Duglas and multi instrumentalist Andrew Pattie composed and recorded the soundtrack for the independent feature film Dreaded Light. The soundtrack was released on Tapete Records in 2023.

The history of the BMX Bandits from 1986 to the early 1990s forms part of the 2017 documentary Teenage Superstars.

In 2024 BMX Bandits released the studio album Dreamers on the Run. The album was written and produced by Duglas T Stewart and Andrew Pattie. The album featured string arrangements scored by Pattie. Uncut magazine described the album as “a bold and seductive exploration of symphonic pop”, while Classic Rock Magazine said “Against the odds, BMX Bandits have finally painted their masterpiece”.

The band features in the book Postcards from Scotland detailing the 1980s and 1990s independent music scene in Scotland.

== Members ==
Over the years the membership of the group has fluctuated. Only vocalist Duglas T. Stewart has been a permanent member.

=== Current ===
- Duglas T. Stewart – lead vocals
- Rory Haye - guitar, bass, vocals

=== Former ===
- Norman Blake – guitar, drums, keyboards, vocals
- Finlay MacDonald – bass, guitar, keyboards
- Jim McCulloch – guitar, percussion, vocals
- Chloe Philip – vocals, keyboards, guitar
- Andrew Pattie – guitar, bass, vocals, flute
- Amanda Nivich – bass, vocals
- Liam Chapman – drums, vocals
- Stuart Kidd – guitar, drums, vocals
- Jamie Cameron – guitar
- Lawrence Kim – guitar, keyboards
- Sushil K. Dade - bass
- Sean Dickson – guitar, bass, keyboards
- John Hogarty – guitar
- Gordon Keen – guitar
- Eugene Kelly – guitar, vocals
- David Scott – keyboards, guitar, vocals
- Martin Kirwan – guitar
- Francis MacDonald – drums, guitar, keyboards, vocals
- Joseph McAlinden – bass, keyboards, violin, guitar
- Billy Woods – vocals
- Willie McArdie – drums
- Gareth Perrie – keyboards
- Jamie Gash – drums
- Rachel Allison – vocals, percussion
- Brian McEwan – guitar, bass
- James McEwan – keyboards
- Gabriel Telerman – guitar, bass
- Paul Kelly – bass, keyboards

== Discography ==
=== Albums ===
| Year | Title | Record label |
|---|---|---|
| 1989 | Totally Groovy Live Experience! | Avalanche |
| 1989 | C86 | Click! |
| 1991 | Star Wars | Vinyl Japan |
| 1993 | Life Goes On | Creation |
| 1995 | Gettin' Dirty | Creation |
| 1996 | Theme Park | Creation |
| 2003 | Down at the Hop | Shoeshine |
| 2006 | My Chain | RevOla |
| 2007 | Bee Stings | Poppydisc |
| 2012 | BMX Bandits in Space | Elefant |
| 2017 | BMX Bandits Forever | Elefant |
| 2023 | Music For The Film Dreaded Light | Tapete |
| 2024 | Dreamers on the Run | Tapete |

=== Singles and EPs ===
| Year | Title | Record label |
|---|---|---|
| 1986 | E102 / Sad? | 53rd & 3rd |
| 1986 | What A Wonderful World / The Day Before Tomorrow | 53rd & 3rd |
| 1988 | Figure 4 | 53rd & 3rd |
| 1991 | Come Clean | Vinyl Japan |
| 1991 | Television Personalities / BMX Bandits - Your Class / Someone To Share My Life With | Clawfist |
| 1992 | Gordon Keen And His BMX Bandits | Sunflower Records |
| 1992 | Serious Drugs | Creation Records |
| 1993 | Little Hands | Creation Records |
| 1993 | Kylie's Got A Crush On Us | Creation Records |
| 1993 | Little Hands | Creation Records |
| 1994 | BMX Bandits / The Duglasettes - Islands In The Stream / Love Machine | Bring On Bull Records |
| 1995 | Love, Come To Me / That Summer Feeling | Creation Records |
| 1995 | Gettin' Dirty | Creation Records |
| 1995 | Lost Girl | Creation Records |
| 1996 | Help Me, Somebody | Shoeshine Records |
| 1996 | We're Gonna Shake You Down | Creation Records |
| 2002 | Whirlpool # 2 / Honey Honey (Guiding Star) | Emma's House Recordings |
| 2003 | Back In Your Arms | Shoeshine Records |
| 2006 | The Sailor's Song / Doorways | Hungry Records |
| 2009 | The BMX Love E.P. | Elefant Records |
| 2012 | Listen To Some Music | Elefant Records |
| 2013 | Beautiful Friend | Elefant Records |
| 2013 | All Around The World | Elefant Records |
| 2014 | My Girl Midge | Elefant Records |
| 2017 | It's In Her Eyes | Elefant Records |
| 2018 | Way Of The Wolf | Elefant Records |
| 2020 | Razorblades & Honey (with Anton Newcombe & Hifi Sean) | Click Records |
| 2022 | Spinning Through Time | Tapete Records |

=== Compilations ===
- C86 Plus (1992 Vinyl Japan/Elefant) (compilation)
- 53rd and 3rd Years (1999 Avalanche) (compilation)
- On the Radio, 1986–1996 (2003 Vinyl Japan) (compilation)
- Serious Drugs – the Creation Years (2005 Castle) (best of... compilation)
- The Rise and Fall of BMX Bandits (2009 Elefant)

=== Live ===
- Totally Groovy Live Experience (1989 Avalanche)
- Hidden Agenda (with Kim Fowley) (1997 Receiver) (without the group's blessing)

=== Solo albums ===
- Duglas Stewart's Frankenstein (1996 Vinyl Japan) (solo album featuring contributions from other BMX Bandits)
