= Ally Kerr =

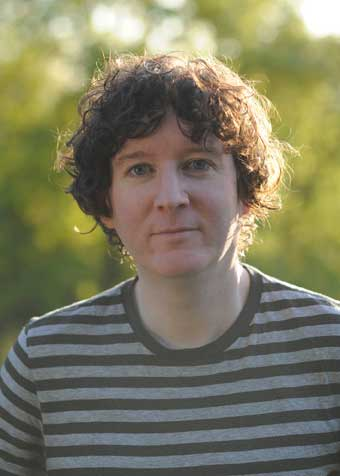

Background information
- Origin: Glasgow, Scotland
- Genres: Pop, indie
- Years active: 2004–present
- Labels: Much Obliged; Pastel Music; Ultra Vybe; Elefant; Neon Tetra; Quince; Vibez; Lilystars
- Website: allykerr.com

Ally Kerr is a singer-songwriter from Glasgow, Scotland.

His first release, Midst of the Storm, was a 7-inch vinyl single (EP) on the Spanish label Elefant Records. An album, Calling Out To You, followed on Japanese label Quince Records in 2004 and on Neon Tetra Records (UK) in 2005. Producers included Duglas T. Stewart (BMX Bandits), Duncan Cameron (Riverside Studios) and David Scott (The Pearlfishers). The Sore Feet Song was used as a theme to Japanese animated TV series Mushishi and released in Japan as a CD single through Marvelous Entertainment. The series has since aired in several countries and was released on DVD in America, Australia and the UK as well as being made available on Netflix.

Kerr's second album, Off The Radar, was recorded and produced by David Scott (The Pearlfishers), and released on Much Obliged Records (UK / Europe / US), Universal Records (Philippines) as well as in Japan on the Ultra-Vybe / Star Sign label in 2008, and through Triangle Music in South Korea. Kerr has spent time touring in Asia (Japan, Singapore, Philippines, Taiwan, China) and Europe. In June 2015 Kerr embarked on a headlining tour of China covering 10 cities following a 2013 trip to the country to play at two festivals.

His third album, Viva Melodia was recorded with Marcus Mackay at The Diving Bell Lounge studio in Glasgow, and was produced by Biff Smith (The Starlets / A New International). It was released on Much Obliged Records (through Shellshock Distribution / The Orchard worldwide), licensed to Pastel Music (Korea) and distributed by Ultra Vybe (Japan).

Kerr's fourth album Upgrade Me was released on 18 January 2019 through Much Obliged Records (Shellshock Distribution / The Orchard worldwide), and licensed to Vibes (China), Hinote (Taiwan and Hong Kong), Leeway (South Korea) and distributed by Ultra Vybe in Japan. The album was produced by Biff Smith (A New International / The Colour of Whisky) and engineered by Johnny Smillie in Glasgow. Kerr embarked on a second headline tour of China in May 2019. The title song Upgrade Me featured in episode 28 of Terrace House Tokyo (Netflix Japan) on 31 December 2019.

An album of new cinematic-style instrumental songs (entitled Soundtracks) was released as an album on 27 November 2020.

Kerr's new self-produced singer-songwriter album entitled "True Nature", was released on 25 April 2025, preceded by a series of singles. The album is Kerr's second venture into music production. The album was released on Much Obliged Records globally (via Sony/The Orchard), and licensed to Lilystars Records (SE Asia), and Vibez. (China).

"True Nature" features a blend of acoustic and electric guitars, piano, strings, synths, and soundscapes.

To promote the release, Kerr played shows in Philippines, Japan, Spain and China in 2025.

== Discography ==
=== EPs ===
- Midst of the Storm (2002)

=== Studio albums ===
- Calling Out To You (2004)
- Off The Radar (2008)
- Viva Melodia (2013)
- Upgrade Me (2019)
- Soundtracks (2020)
- True Nature (2025)
