= Jesse Garon and the Desperadoes =

- Origin: Edinburgh, Scotland
- Genres: Indie pop
- Years active: 1985–1990
- Labels: Narodnik, Velocity, Avalanche
- Past members: Andrew Tully; Angus McPake; Fran Schoppler; Margarita Vasquez-Ponte; Kevin McMahon; Stuart Clarke; Bruce Hopkins; John Robb; Michael Kerr; Dave Evans; Keith Burns; Jeremy Black

Jesse Garon and the Desperadoes were a Scottish band formed from around, and within, the Edinburgh indie pop scene of the mid-1980s. The band had a distinctive guitar-jangle sound with male and female vocals. The band took their name from Elvis Presley's stillborn twin brother, Jesse Garon Presley.

== History ==
The original members of the band were Andrew Tully (guitars/vocals), Eric Webster and Angus McPake (bass guitar), Fran Schoppler (vocals), Margarita Vasquez-Ponte (drums), Kevin McMahon (guitars), and Stuart Clarke (guitar). Tully and Vasquez-Ponte were also members of Rote Kapelle, a band that was active from 1985 to 1988.

This initial line-up recorded the first two singles, "Splashing Along" and "The Rain Fell Down" (described by one reviewer as a "pop gem that's not to be missed") on Narodnik Records. With the departure of McMahon and Clarke, Bruce Hopkins and John Robb (not the Manchester writer) were drafted in for third single, the Billy the Whizz EP; these being replaced on a more permanent basis by Michael Kerr (of Meat Whiplash). Next release was a flexi-disc featuring the track "Hank Williams Is Dead" along with a track by The Fizzbombs, a side-project of Margarita and Angus, along with Ann Donald of The Shop Assistants. Moving to Velocity Records, the band released two more well-received singles, "The Adam Faith Experience" and "You'll Never Be That Young Again", followed by first album, A Cabinet of Curiosities, which collected the tracks released to date.

In 1989, Robb left to join The Darling Buds, and the band returned in 1990 with single "Grand Hotel", a reference to the IRA bombing of Brighton's Grand Hotel, the venue for the Conservative Party conference. Tully described this as a "fuck Thatcher and fuck the IRA for not killing her when they had the chance" song. The album Nixon followed, and in October 1990, they released their final single, the Hold Me Now EP.

Schoppler released a solo album, 1 2 3 4 5 6 7 8 in 2000, recorded with Mick Cooke of Belle & Sebastian and Roy Hunter.

== Discography ==
=== Albums ===
- A Cabinet of Curiosities (Jan 1989, Velocity, SPEEDLP111 [LP]) - UK Indie #20
- Nixon (Mar 1990, Avalanche, ONLYLP001/ONLYMC001/ONLYCD001)

=== Singles and EPs ===
- "Splashing Along" (Oct 1986, Narodnik, NRK001 [7"])
- "The Rain Fell Down" (Mar 1987, Narodnik, NRK002 [7"]) - UK Indie #21
- Billy the Whizz EP (May 1987, Narodnik, NRK005T [12"]) - UK Indie #16
- "Hank Williams Is Dead" (1987, Wild Rumpus, ? [7" flexi])
- "The Adam Faith Experience" (Jan 1988, Velocity, SPEED001 [7"]/SPEEDT001 [12"]) video - UK Indie #9
- "You'll Never Be That Young Again" (Jan 1989, Velocity, SPEED002 [7"]) - UK Indie #15
- "Grand Hotel" (Jan 1990, Avalanche, AGAP002 [7"]) video
- Hold Me Now EP (Oct 1990, Avalanche, AGAP001 [12"])
