= Big Gold Dream =

- Directed by: Grant McPhee
- Written by: Angela Slaven
- Produced by: Grant McPhee; Wendy Griffin; Erik Sandberg; Innes Reekie; Angela Slaven
- Starring: Bob Last; Hilary Morrison; Malcolm Ross; John Mackie; Paul 'Research' Mackie; Robert King; Tam Dean Burn; Davy Henderson; Faye Fyfe; Jill Bryson; Alan McGee; Alan Rankine
- Narrated by: Robert Forster (musician)
- Cinematography: Grant McPhee; Martin Parry; Garry Torrance
- Edited by: Angela Slaven
- Distributed by: Tartan Features
- Release date: June 19, 2015 (Edinburgh International Film Festival)
- Running time: 94 minutes
- Country: Scotland
- Language: English

Big Gold Dream is a 2015 film documenting the story of Scotland's post-punk scene, focusing on record labels Fast Product and Postcard Records. Directed by filmmaker Grant McPhee, the film's name is taken from the 1981 Fire Engines single of the same name, the final release on the Pop Aural label.

The film won the 2015 Edinburgh International Film Festival Audience Award and was followed by another music documentary in 2017 called Teenage Superstars, which was about acts associated with Creation Records and the 53rd & 3rd label.

== Overview ==
Using a combination of interviews, archive material and specially-shot footage, the film traces the development of a post-punk scene in Scotland, tracing its roots in the punk explosion of 1977 and its effect on the Edinburgh music scene, with the emergence of bands such as Scars and The Dirty Reds and the appearance of record label Fast Product, which went on to release records by The Human League, The Mekons, Joy Division and Gang of Four. The film goes on to chart (and contrast) the rise and fall of Glasgow's poppier Postcard Records, home to Orange Juice and east-coast defectors, Josef K.

While primarily regarded as a music documentary, McPhee has stated that he sees Big Gold Dream as a study of creative autonomy and DIY culture:

Contrary to how it has been marketed, this film is not a history of Scottish punk or independent music. Nor is it really about Scotland. At its core, it is a story about young people taking control into their own hands and expressing themselves creatively without seeking permission from any authority—the young people featured in our film simply happened to choose ‘post-punk’ music as their medium.

== Production ==
Big Gold Dream took nine years to produce, with the first interviews filmed in 2006. McPhee attributes this to a dearth of available resources, stating that "in the early days things moved very slowly, equipment and time were expensive so we had to save up for a while to do each interview – and that was frustrating. Even a dozen interviews could take a couple of years." So much footage was captured over this period that a second documentary, Teenage Superstars, followed, following the story of the Scottish music scene from the mid-eighties to early nineties, including interviews with Teenage Fanclub's Norman Blake and Eugene Kelly of The Vaselines.

An interview-only feature length companion film 'The Glasgow School' was released on DVD in 2016, focusing on Postcard Records and Swamplands and utilised unused interviews filmed for Big Gold Dream.

== Release ==
Big Gold Dream premiered at the Edinburgh International Film Festival on 19 June 2015, going on to show at Raindance, Belfast Film Festival, Leeds International Film Festival, Doc'n Roll Film Festival and Cambridge Film Festival. It was also included in the schedules of music festivals including The Great Escape, Indiepop NYC and Electric Fields.

Big Gold Dream received a television premiere on BBC Two on 15 April 2016.

== Reception ==
The film was roundly well-received, including 8/10 in Uncut, 4* in Mojo, 4* in Record Collector Magazine and 5* in Musikexpress, as well as positive reviews in the Scotsman and Louder than War.

Dazed and Confused named it one of the best music documentaries of 2015 and it was included in Sight & Sound's best of 2015 list.

Big Gold Dream received its premiere at the 2015 Edinburgh International Film Festival on 19 June. Its screening saw it win the Audience Award. In Sight and Sounds Best Films of 2015 Poll it was voted 131 on the list. The film was self distributed on DVD via through Rough Trade and Love Music in 2017. After the film was screened on BBC 2 it led to a large amount of positive press in newspapers and online articles including Vice, Dazed and Pitchfork.

In May 2016 Big Gold Dream screened at a special event at New York University, Rough Trade NYC and The NYC Pop-Fest. For the occasion a commemorative cassette and limited edition screen-printed poster were created by Texte Und Tone. The cassette notes were an extended conversation between Michael Train and Michael Vazquez, who had programmed a continuous 96-hour broadcast of Scottish underground music during 1994, in Massachusetts.

Cherry Red Records released a five-CD box set, entitled Big Gold Dreams that acted as a tie-in with the film.

In October 2018 it was part of the National Museum of Scotland's 2018 Rip it Up exhibition where it screened at Edinburgh's Filmhouse.

'The source interviews for Big Gold Dream and The Glasgow School were revisited for the 2022 book, Hungry Beat, an oral history of Fast Product and Postcard Records. The book was written by Douglas MacIntyre and Grant McPhee with Neil Cooper and published by White rabbit Books.'

Many of the interviews for the film were used as the basis for the 2022 book, Hungry Beat, written by Douglas MacIntyre and Grant McPhee with Neil Cooper and published by White Rabbit Books.

== Awards ==
Big Gold Dream won the Edinburgh International Film Festival Audience Award in 2015.
