= Grant McPhee =

Scottish film director

- Occupation: Film Director
- Years active: 2002–present

Grant McPhee is a Scottish film director, cinematographer and writer. His films include the music documentaries Big Gold Dream, Teenage Superstars and the drama, Far From the Apple Tree starring Sorcha Groundsell. He won the prestigious audience choice award in 2015 for his film Big Gold Dream at the 2015 edition of the Edinburgh International Film Festival. In television, he worked as a second unit director and cinematographer on Outlander.

He has written articles for The National, I News, Clash Music, Caught by the River, Louder Than War, Bella Caledonia and the books Hungry Beat (as co-writer) published by White Rabbit Books, Postcards From Scotland published by Omnibus Books and a soon to be released book on Glasgow’s 1990’s underground music scene. In 2022, he co-wrote the book, Hungry Beat, an oral history of Scottish Post-Punk music which was published by White Rabbit Books. This was followed by Postcards from Scotland 1980's and 1990's independent music scene. A second volume is planned which will explore Scotland's late 80s and 90's underground music scene, focussing on the 13th Note Club, Glasgow Music Collective and Belle and Sebastian.

He is currently working on an upcoming project on the Rolling Stones manager Andrew Loog Oldham as well as leading on a series of films covering Liverpool’s post-punk music scene as well as the cities 60s, 70s and 80s cultural underground.

== Filmography ==
Year	Film	Credited as				Additional Roles	Notes
Year	Film	Director	Cinematographer	ScreenWriter	Producer	Additional Roles	Notes
2003	The Jacket					Video Assistant Operator	
2003	Man to Man					Camera Trainee	
2005	The Autograph Hunters	Yes	Yes	Yes			Short Film
2006	Effluvium	Yes	Yes				Short Film
2007	Arn: The Knight Templar					Video Assist Operator: Scotland	
2007	Unflame	Yes	Yes				Short Film
2007	Aphlogistic	Yes	Yes				Short Film
2008	Doomsday					Video Assist Operator	
2008	Between Above and Below	Yes	Yes				
2009	Book of Blood					Clapper Loader: Second Unit	
2009	Shadow Halation	Yes	Yes				Short Film
2009	Hazel		Yes				Short Film
2009	Motion/Static		Yes				Short Film
2009	The Bell Witch of Leith	Yes	Yes				Short Film
2010	Blindside					Additional Photography	Short Film
2010	Long Distance		Yes				Short Film
2010	Mum's Birthday		Yes				Short Film
2011	You Instead					Clapper Loader: A Camera	Short Film
2011	The Wicker Tree					Camera Assistant	
2011	One Day					Second Camera Assistant: Second Unit	
2011	The Awakening					Clapper Loader: B Camera	
2011	A Portentous Death		Yes				Short Film
2011	Guilt		Yes				Short Film
2012	Citadel					Digital Imaging Technician	
2012	Day of the Flowers					Clapper Loader B Camera	
2012	Outpost: Black Sun					Digital Imaging Technician	
2012	The Angels' Share					Second Camera Clapper Loader	
2012	Cloud Atlas					Digital Imaging Technician	
2012	Shell					Digital Imaging Technician	
2013	World War Z					Second Assistant Camera: Glasgow	
2013	For Those In Peril					Digital Workflow Supervisor	
2013	Under the Skin					Digital Imaging Technician	
2013	Sunshine on Leith					Digital Workflow Supervisor	
2013	Your Attention Please: Scars	Yes				Digital Workflow Supervisor	
2013	Sarah's Room	Yes	Yes				
2013	Christmas Hear Kids		Yes				
2013	Costume Party		Yes				Short Film
2014	The Silent Storm					Data Workflow Supervisor	
2014	Wigilia		Yes		Yes		
2014	Take It Back and Start All Over		Yes		Yes		
2015	Big Gold Dream	Yes	Yes		Yes		
2015	Stalactites		Yes				
2015	Where Do We Go from Here?		Yes				
2016	Tommy's Honour					Digital Camera Workflow	
2016	Moon Dogs					Camera Workflow Supervisor	
2016	Whisky Galore					Digital Image Supervisor	
2016	Back Home		Yes				
2016	The Glasgow School	Yes			Yes		
2017	T2 Trainspotting					Additional DIT	
2017	Churchill					Digital Imaging Technician	
2017	The Wife					Digital Imaging Technician	
2017	Night Kaleidoscope	Yes	Yes		Yes		
2017	Teenage Superstars	Yes	Yes	Yes	Yes		
2019	Far From the Apple Tree	Yes			Yes		
2021	Fast Forward	Yes			Yes		
2021	Lori and the Six Six Sixties	Yes		Yes	Yes		
2022	Beyond the Speed of Life	Yes	Yes	Yes	Yes		
2024	Outlander	Yes	Yes			2 Episodes 2nd Unit Director; 2 Episodes 2nd Unit Cinematographer)	Tv Series
TBA	Untitled Andrew Loog Oldham Project	Yes					

== Awards and nominations ==
Year	Nominated Work	Award	Category	Result
2005	The Autograph Hunters	Edinburgh International Film Festival	Saltire Society Grierson Award for Short Documentary	Nominated
2013	Sarah's Room	Bootleg Film Festival New York	Best Cinematography	Won
2015	Sarah's Room	Los Angeles Independent Film Festival Awards	Best Cinematography	Nominated
2015	Sarah's Room	Los Angeles Independent Film Festival Awards	Best Action/Thriller/Horror/Fantasy	Nominated
2015	Sarah's Room	Jerome Indie Film and Music Festival	Best Narrative Feature	Won
2015	Sarah's Room	Eureka Springs Digital Film Festival	Best Foreign Film	Nominated
2015	Big Gold Dream	Edinburgh International Film Festival	Audience Choice Award	Won
2017	Night Kaleidoscope	Bloodstained Indie Film Festival	Best Horror Feature	Nominated
2017	Night Kaleidoscope	Diabolical Horror Film Festival	Best Cinematography	Won
2017	Night Kaleidoscope	Genre Celebration Festival	Best Cinematography	Won
2017	Night Kaleidoscope	Shiver International Film Festival	Best Horror Film	Won
2017	Night Kaleidoscope	Shiver International Film Festival	Best Director	Won
2017	Night Kaleidoscope	Shiver International Film Festival	Best Feature of the Year	Won
2017	Night Kaleidoscope	Shock Stock	Best Cinematography	Won
2017	Night Kaleidoscope	Tabloid Witch Awards	Best Cinematography	Won
2017	Teenage Superstars	Edinburgh International Film Festival	Audience Award	Nominated
2017	Teenage Superstars	Edinburgh International Film Festival	Best Documentary Feature Film	Nominated
2017	Wigilia	Love Film Festival	Best Cinematography	Won
2017	Wigilia	Love Film Festival	Best Foreign Film	Nominated
