= Shop Assistants =

Scottish indie pop band (1984–1990)

- Origin: Edinburgh, Scotland
- Genres: Indie pop
- Years active: 1984–1987; 1989–1990
- Labels: Villa21; The Subway Organization; 53rd & 3rd; Chrysalis; Blue Guitar; Avalanche
- Past members: Joan Bride; Moray Crawford; Ann Donald; David Keegan; Sarah Kneale; Laura MacPhail; Karen Parker; John Peutherer; Alex Taylor; Margarita Vasquez-Ponte; Annabel Wright

Shop Assistants were a Scottish indie pop band from Edinburgh, formed in 1984, initially as Buba & the Shop Assistants. After achieving success with independent releases they signed to Chrysalis Records sublabel Blue Guitar, releasing their only album in 1986. After splitting in 1987, with singer Alex Taylor moving on to the Motorcycle Boy, they reformed for two further singles in 1990.

== History ==
The group began as Buba & the Shop Assistants, consisting of lead vocalist Aggi (Annabel Wright, later of the Pastels), guitarist David Keegan, bassist John Peutherer, and drummer Moray Crawford. This line-up released one single, the now highly collectible "Something to Do" on Villa21 Records, which was produced by Stephen Pastel. Pastel also contributed backing vocals. Peutherer and Crawford were credited on the sleeve as "Murray-John".

Aggi left to be replaced by Karen Parker, who was later joined by second vocalist Alex Taylor. After some live performances, Parker, Peutherer, and Crawford departed and were replaced by Sarah Kneale (bass), Laura MacPhail (drums) and Ann Donald (drums). The band's name was shortened to Shop Assistants, and the first release under their new name was the Shopping Parade EP in 1985 on The Subway Organization. The lead track, "All Day Long" was described by Morrissey as his favourite single of that year.

Donald left in late 1985, and was briefly replaced on drums by Joan Bride. Shopping Parade was followed in early 1986 with "Safety Net", the first release on Keegan's 53rd & 3rd Records, which peaked at number two in the UK Independent Chart, and the band recorded a national radio session with Janice Long and a second John Peel session, both of BBC's Radio One. The exposure they gained from the sessions enabled the group to have two songs to be voted into John Peel's Festive Fifty in both 1985 and 1986.

In 1986, Shop Assistants were featured on NME's compilation C86 with one of their slower songs, "It's Up to You", taken from the Shopping Parade EP. Also in that year, they signed to Chrysalis Records's sub-label Blue Guitar for another single, "I Don't Wanna Be Friends With You", as well as their only album, Shop Assistants. That single reached number 77 in the UK Singles Chart, while the LP spent one week at number 100 in the UK Albums Chart. The album was re-released on CD in 2001. In 2024 it was re-released on vinyl and on a double CD set which includes unreleased and live tracks, and a John Peel session.

Shop Assistants split early in 1987, when Taylor left the group to join the Motorcycle Boy. After a two-year hiatus, the group reformed without Taylor, and with Kneale on vocals, MacPhail on bass, and the addition of Margarita Vasquez-Ponte of Jesse Garon and the Desperadoes on drums. With the new line-up, they recorded new material in late October 1989 at Chamber Studios in Edinburgh; releasing the singles "Here It Comes" in 1989 and "Big 'E' Power" in 1990 on Avalanche Records. They also recorded a cover of the Rolling Stones' 1978 song "Respectable" for the tribute album Stoned Again - A Tribute to The Rolling Stones on Imaginary Records. They split up again shortly afterwards, with Keegan joining the Pastels.

It was revealed in 2020 that Alex Taylor had died in 2005.

The band features in the book Postcards from Scotland detailing the 1980s and 1990s independent music scene in Scotland.

== Discography ==
=== Albums ===
- Shop Assistants (November 1986, Blue Guitar Records) UK No. 100

=== Singles ===
- "Something to Do" (November 1984, Villa) - as Buba & the Shop Assistants
- Shopping Parade EP: "All Day Long"; "Switzerland"; "All That Ever Mattered"; "It's Up to You" (August 1985, Subway)
- "Safety Net" (February 1986, 53rd & 3rd) UK No. 155
- "I Don't Wanna Be Friends With You" (September 1986, Blue Guitar) UK No. 77
- "Here It Comes" (January 1990, Avalanche Recordst)
- "Big 'E' Power" (May 1990, Avalanche Records) UK No. 151
