= OX4 The Best of Ride =

OX4_ the Best of Ride

Greatest hits album by Ride
- Released: 24 September 2001
- Recorded: 1989–96
- Genre: Alternative rock, shoegaze
- Length: 67:31
- Label: Creation Records, The First Time Records, Ignition Records
- Producer: Various

Ride chronology
Tarantula (1996)	OX4_ the Best of Ride (2001)	Waves: Radio 1 Sessions 90–94 (2003)

Professional ratings
Review scores
Source	Rating
AllMusic	4/5 stars
Blender	3/5 stars
No Ripcord	9/10

OX4_ The Best of Ride is a compilation album by the British band Ride, released in 2001 by Ignition Records in the United Kingdom. The album was also released as the first disc in the three-disc Ride Box Set, which also included Firing Blanks_ Unreleased Ride Recordings 1988-95 and Live at Reading Festival 1992. The American edition was released by The First Time Records in 2002 and included a second disc with four of the unreleased tracks from Firing Blanks. The title is a reference to the band's local Oxford postcode in their teenage years.

== Track listing ==
No.	Title	Album	Length
1.	"Chelsea Girl"	Ride (1990)	2:58
2.	"Drive Blind"	Ride	4:45
3.	"Like a Daydream"	Play (1990)	3:06
4.	"Taste"	Fall (1990)	3:17
5.	"Dreams Burn Down"	Nowhere (1990)	6:04
6.	"Vapour Trail"	Nowhere	4:17
7.	"Unfamiliar"	Today Forever (1991)	5:09
8.	"Leave Them All Behind"	Going Blank Again (1992)	8:16
9.	"Twisterella"	Going Blank Again	3:42
10.	"OX4"	Going Blank Again	5:05
11.	"Birdman"	Carnival of Light (1994)	6:37
12.	"From Time to Time"	Carnival of Light	4:39
13.	"How Does it Feel to Feel"	Carnival of Light	3:39
14.	"I Don't Know Where it Comes From"	Carnival of Light	3:25
15.	"Black Nite Crash"	Tarantula (1996)	2:32
Total length:			1:07:31

US Edition Bonus Disc:

1. "Something's Burning"
2. "Tongue Tied"
3. "She's So Fine"
4. "In a Different Place (Differently)"
