= Vapour Trail (song) =

Single by Ride

from the album Nowhere
- B-side: "Unfamiliar"; "Sennen"; "Beneath"
- Released: April 1, 1991
- Recorded: Blackwing Studios, London (track 1); Blackbarn Studios, Ripley (tracks 2, 3, 4)
- Genre: Shoegaze; indie rock
- Length: 4:18
- Label: Sire; Virgin
- Songwriters: Andy Bell, Loz Colbert, Mark Gardener, Steve Queralt
- Producers: Marc Waterman (track 1); Matt Oliver (tracks 2, 3, 4)

Ride singles chronology
"Taste" (1991)	"Vapour Trail" (1991)	"Leave Them All Behind" (1992)

"Vapour Trail" is a song by British shoegaze band Ride. It is the closing track of the band's debut album, Nowhere (1990), released on Creation Records, and was later released as a single in the United States in early 1991. Written by lead guitarist Andy Bell (but credited to the whole band), the song features a distinctive swirling guitar riff, a strong, fill-based drum beat, and a coda that includes a string quartet.

The song is the band's most well known and later was voted number 145 on Pitchfork's "Top 200 Tracks of the 90s".

== Composition ==
"Vapour Trail" is written in standard tuning, with the main riff constructed from a four chord pattern (C♯ minor–B–A–E) which opens the song and repeats throughout, characterized by the distinct sound of two Rickenbacker 12-string guitars. The guitar sound on the song has been the subject of much debate. Fans have stated the use of compression, flanger, and chorus effects as the closest ways to emulate the trebly rhythm sound. However, according to Bell, no actual effects were used to achieve the sound, and that it was purely the two 12-stringed guitars. Bell said of the song:

I remember writing the riff in a hotel room on a very early Ride tour. We were in a bed and breakfast type scenario, and I was sitting on a bed with an acoustic to get that four-chord pattern which is really very simple. It’s played on two 12-strings. People seem to be quite interested with the guitar sound on this record, if there are fades or effects, but there’s not; it’s just two 12-strings. It’s just one of those magical songs. That’s the one that everyone talks about on the album in my experience. These songs are the easiest to write and the ones that you don’t really think about at the time. It came out so easily and it has that effortless feel to it. I guess it is the one I’m most proud of from that era.

Played alongside the main guitar melody is a droning E power chord and a bassline consisting of the same chord sequence as the main riff. A heavy drum beat centered around fills and syncopation on the snare and tom-toms, a signature part of drummer Laurence "Loz" Colbert's style, is also a major force of the song's composition. After two verses and two choruses, the song closes with a nearly two-minute string-laden instrumental coda. The guitars, bass, and drums gradually fade out, leaving only the repeated violin and cello motif. Bell sings lead vocals on the song, something rare among the band's early material.

== Release and reception ==
"Vapour Trail" was featured as the closing track to Nowhere, released on 15 October 1990, although three tracks from the band's Fall EP were appended to CD releases of the album. Sire Records—which handled Creation's distribution in North America—released "Vapour Trail" as a CD single for the American market in April 1991. The single was essentially a re-hash of the band's Today Forever EP (which had not seen a US release), using the first three tracks as B-sides, as well as reusing the cover artwork. Despite the song's popularity, it failed to chart.

Upon its release, "Vapour Trail" received critical acclaim. Pitchfork voted it as number 145 on its Top 200 Tracks of the 90s, writing the song "remains immense, standing tall as the most gripping four-and-half-minutes of their career. Twenty years later, it's exciting to realize there's a lot more to be relished in between all its chimes." The song is mentioned in the novel The Perks of Being a Wallflower as being a track on a mixtape the narrator makes for his friends titled "One Winter". It also appeared as the end credit's song in Gregg Araki's Totally F***ed Up (1993), the first film of his Teenage Apocalypse Trilogy. The Cure frontman Robert Smith said of ‘Vapour Trail’, "it’s one of the best fifteen-second intros of all time.”

== Music video ==
The music video for "Vapour Trail" was directed by Kevin Kerslake. Kerslake later directed the video for "Leave Them All Behind". Both videos, along with the promo videos for "Chelsea Girl" and "Taste" were featured on The Story of Creation VHS in 1992 as well as the Japanese Today Forever VHS. The video consists of grainy, slowed-down, color negative footage of the band in the Oxfordshire villages and hamlets of Minster Lovell, Stadhampton and Godstow.

== Track listing ==
US CD (Sire, 9 40055-2)
No.	Title	Lyrics	Music	Lead vocals	Length
1.	"Vapour Trail"	Andy Bell	Bell	Bell	4:16
2.	"Unfamiliar"	Mark Gardener	Bell, Loz Colbert, Gardener, Steve Queralt	Gardener and Bell	4:56
3.	"Sennen"	Bell	Bell, Colbert, Gardener, Queralt	Gardener and Bell	4:23
4.	"Beneath"	Bell	Bell, Colbert, Gardener, Queralt	Gardener and Bell	4:06

== Cover versions ==
Trespassers William released a cover of Vapour Trail as a single, which appears on the 2003 Bella Union version of their second album Different Stars.

INHEAVEN released an acoustic version of Vapour Trail on their 2017 Acoustic EP.

The Kubrick Stare released a version of Vapour Trail in 2026 as a digital 7" single.
