= Twisterella =

Single by Ride

from the album Going Blank Again
- B-side: "Going Blank Again" "Howard Hughes" "Stampede"
- Released: 13 April 1992
- Recorded: May–November 1991
- Studio: Chipping Norton Recording Studios, Chipping Norton; Blackbarn Studios, Ripley
- Genre: Jangle pop; power pop
- Length: 3:42
- Label: Creation/Sire
- Composers: Andy Bell, Loz Colbert, Mark Gardener, Steve Queralt
- Lyricist: Mark Gardener
- Producers: Alan Moulder, Ride

Ride singles chronology
"Leave Them All Behind" (1992)	"Twisterella" (1992)	"Birdman" (1994)

"Twisterella" is a song by the British rock band Ride. It was released on 13 April 1992 by Creation/Sire as the second single from the band's second studio album, Going Blank Again (1992). It features Mark Gardener on lead vocals, who wrote its lyrics about his experiences with London nightlife. The song is described as "jangly Rickenbacker pop", in contrast to the band's typical shoegaze stylings.

Following the success of the band's previous single "Leave Them All Behind", which reached the top ten in the United Kingdom, commercial expectations were high for "Twisterella", which manager Dave Newton referred to as the band's "ace card." However, the song underperformed, peaking at only No. 36 on the UK Singles Chart. As a result, Creation Records decided not to release another single from Going Blank Again, ceasing promotion of the album in the United Kingdom.

== Background ==
"Twisterella" is described as a jangle pop and power pop song, drawing comparisons to bands such as Teenage Fanclub and the Stone Roses. BrooklynVegan believed that "Twisterella" was influenced by Stax Records and Motown. It was also noted to be a "move away from the quiet/loud shoegaze dynamic", and its poppy nature was a result of the band realizing that they did not need to create loud, dynamic moments in every song. Gardener was introduced to the power pop band Big Star by Creation Records founder Alan McGee, and he began to record the demo for "Twisterella" shortly after being enraptured by Big Star's music.

"Twisterella" is named after a song from the 1963 film Billy Liar as the two contain the same chord structure. The song is led by Gardener, but Andy Bell sings the line "look at Twisterella, she hasn't got a fella", taken from the movie, over the outro. Gardener wrote the song about his experiences clubbing in London, including occasional acid trips. The lyric "You can't see when light's so strong, you can’t see when the light has gone" was taken from The Unbearable Lightness of Being by Czech author Milan Kundera, which Gardener was reading at the time.

It’s about getting on the Oxford bus and going into London, meeting Alan McGee and Primal Scream and having crazy nights. Afterwards I’d always wonder why I’d done it – I wanted something more. But I’d always go back.

— Mark Gardener

== Reception ==
While "Leave Them All Behind" reached No. 9 in the United Kingdom despite its unconventional length and song structure, Ride believed that it would be "Twisterella" that would take them to even greater commercial heights. Despite the band's hopes, it did not become their breakthrough single as it only peaked at No. 36, Ride's worst showing on the singles charts since the band's debut EP in 1990. The band expected the song to place on the BBC Radio 1 national playlist, but it did not, and Newton recalled having to dial in 180 separate times to request it as the Simon Mayo Breakfast Show record of the week.

Creation Records decided against releasing a third single from the album because "Twisterella" disappointed on the charts, and the label stopped promoting Going Blank Again in the United Kingdom. Bell pointed to the song's poor performance as the beginning of the band's decline, as the band soon embarked on a troubled American tour which increased tensions that led to Ride's breakup in 1996. "It's a weird one, the rise and fall being so close together," he said.

== Charts ==
Chart (1992)	Peak position
Australia (ARIA)	105
UK Singles (OCC)	36
UK Airplay (Music Week)	34
US Alternative Airplay (Billboard)	12
