= Weather Diaries =

Studio album by Ride
- Released: 16 June 2017
- Recorded: November 2016 – February 2017
- Studio: Vale (Worcestershire); Phantasy Sound (London)
- Genre: Alternative rock, shoegaze, dream pop, post-punk revival
- Length: 52:10
- Label: Wichita Recordings, Play It Again Sam
- Producer: Erol Alkan

Ride chronology
Waves: Radio 1 Sessions 90–94 (2003)	Weather Diaries (2017)	Tomorrow's Shore (2018)

Singles from Weather Diaries
- 1. "Charm Assault" Released: 21 February 2017; 2. "Home Is a Feeling" Released: 22 February 2017; 3. "All I Want" Released: 26 April 2017; 4. "Cali" Released: 1 September 2017

Weather Diaries is the fifth studio album by English rock band Ride. The album was released on 16 June 2017, and is the first Ride album since 1996's Tarantula. The album was produced by English DJ Erol Alkan and mixed by long-time Ride collaborator Alan Moulder.

== Release ==
The album was supported by two singles: "Charm Assault", released on 21 February 2017, and "Home Is a Feeling" released the next day.

The Japanese edition features the bonus track, which is the remix edition of "Home Is a Feeling", also with the limited edition Tote Bag.

== Reception ==
Professional ratings
Aggregate scores
Source	Rating
Metacritic	74/100
Review scores
Source	Rating
AllMusic	3.5/5 stars
Clash	7/10
Consequence of Sound	B−
Drowned in Sound	7/10
The Guardian	4/5 stars
Pitchfork	6.3/10
PopMatters	8/10 stars

Reviews were largely positive. Spin felt the album had less shoegaze and was a simplified sound compared to early albums.

== Track listing ==
All tracks are written by Ride.

No.	Title	Lyrics	Length
1.	"Lannoy Point"	Mark Gardener	5:58
2.	"Charm Assault"	Andy Bell	4:12
3.	"All I Want"	Gardener & Bell	3:56
4.	"Home Is a Feeling"	Bell	3:20
5.	"Weather Diaries"	Bell	7:00
6.	"Rocket Silver Symphony"	Loz Colbert	5:24
7.	"Lateral Alice"	Bell	2:54
8.	"Cali"	Bell	6:30
9.	"Integration Tape"		2:26
10.	"Impermanence"	Bell	4:22
11.	"White Sands"	Gardener	6:08
Total length:			52:10

Japanese bonus track
No.	Title	Length
12.	"Home Is a Feeling Remix (A Creamy Crambled Suite for a Ride, by Babe, Terror)"	25:44
Total length:		77:53

== Personnel ==
Personnel taken from Weather Diaries liner notes.

Ride

- Andy Bell
- Loz Colbert
- Mark Gardener
- Steve Queralt

Technical personnel

- Erol Alkan – production
- Chris D'Adda – engineering (Vale Studios)
- Jimmy Robertson – engineering (Phantasy Sound)
- Ride – additional recording and production
- Alan Moulder – mixing
- Caesar Edmunds – mix assistance
- Claudio Szynkier as Babe, Terror – remix, Japanese bonus track
- Nick Scott – artwork
- David Ogilvy – portraits

== Charts ==
Chart (2017)	Peak position
Belgian Albums (Ultratop Flanders)	75
Belgian Albums (Ultratop Wallonia)	63
Irish Albums (IRMA)	53
Japanese Albums (Oricon)	39
Scottish Albums (OCC)	12
UK Albums (OCC)	11
UK Independent Albums (OCC)	2
