= Tomorrow's Shore =

EP by Ride
- Released: 16 February 2018
- Studio: Vale (Worcestershire)
- Genre: Shoegazing
- Length: 18:17
- Label: Wichita
- Producer: Erol Alkan

Ride chronology
Weather Diaries (2017)	Tomorrow's Shore (2018)	This Is Not a Safe Place (2019)

Professional ratings
Review scores
Source	Rating
Pitchfork	7.0/10

Tomorrow's Shore is an EP by the British rock band Ride, released on 16 February 2018. It features tracks from the recordings for the band's 2017 comeback album, Weather Diaries.

The EP was produced by Erol Alkan, who produced Weather Diaries, and mixed by long-time collaborator Alan Moulder. It was released by Wichita Recordings.

== Track listing ==
All tracks are written by Ride.

No.	Title	Length
1.	"Pulsar"	4:22
2.	"Keep It Surreal"	3:14
3.	"Cold Water People"	4:31
4.	"Catch You Dreaming"	6:08
Total length:		18:17

== Personnel ==
Personnel taken from Tomorrow's Shore liner notes.

Ride

- Andy Bell
- Loz Colbert
- Mark Gardener
- Steve Queralt

Technical

- Erol Alkan – production, engineering
- Chris D'Adda – engineering
- Ride – additional recording and production
- Alan Moulder – mixing
- Caesar Edmunds – mix assistance
- John Davis – mastering
- Nick Scott – artwork
