= Falling Out into the Night =

EP by Mark Gardener and Goldrush
- Released: 4 November 2003
- Genre: Indie rock
- Length: 14:18
- Label: Truck
- Producer: Mark Gardener and Goldrush

Falling Out into the Night is an EP by Mark Gardener and Goldrush, released in November 2003 on Truck Records. The EP followed on the heels of a number of live performances that featured the members of Goldrush as Mark Gardener's backing band. The EP includes the Gardener-penned song "Snow in Mexico", on which he is backed by Goldrush, and the Goldrush song "Out of Reach". The third track on the EP is a cover of the song "Dreams Burn Down", featuring Gardener and Goldrush together equally. "Dreams Burn Down" had originally been released by Gardener's earlier band Ride in 1990.

The first track on the EP, "Snow in Mexico", was included on Mark Gardener's debut solo album, These Beautiful Ghosts. During an interview for the Bucks Music Group website, Gardener stated that "Snow in Mexico" was inspired by a newspaper headline and is essentially about "how people can blow hot and cold, be one way one minute and then completely different, the next."

== Track listing ==
1. "Snow in Mexico" (Mark Gardener) - 4:14
2. "Out of Reach" (Robin Bennett, Joseph Bennett) - 4:11
3. "Dreams Burn Down" (Andy Bell, Loz Colbert, Mark Gardener, Steve Queralt) - 5:53
