= Magdalen Sky =

Single by Mark Gardener

from the album These Beautiful Ghosts
- B-side: "Can't Let It Die" [Home Demo in the Attic]
- Released: 30 June 1997
- Genre: Indie rock
- Length: 3:39
- Label: Shifty Disco
- Songwriter(s): Kaye Denham; Mark Gardener
- Producer(s): Sam Williams and Mark Gardener

Mark Gardener singles chronology
"Magdalen Sky" (1997)	"Falling Out into the Night" (2003)

"Magdalen Sky" is a song written by Mark Gardener and Kaye Denham. The song was released as Gardener's debut solo single in June 1997 by Shifty Disco Records, following the 1996 break-up of Gardener's previous band Ride. The single was part of Shifty Disco's "Single of the Month" club and had a limited run of 1,000 copies only. The single features the rare B-side "Can't Let It Die", which was also written by Gardener and Denham.

As well as appearing on the Shifty Disco Records' year-end singles compilation It's A Shifty Disco Thing Vol. 1, "Magdalen Sky" was also included on Gardener's debut solo album, These Beautiful Ghosts.

== Track listing ==
1. "Magdalen Sky" (Mark Gardener, Kaye Denham) – 3:39
2. "Can't Let It Die" [Home Demo in the Attic] (Mark Gardener, Kaye Denham) – 3:23
