= This Is Not a Safe Place =

Studio album by Ride
- Released: 16 August 2019
- Recorded: October 2018–March 2019
- Studios: Assault & Battery, London; Vale, Worcestershire; Phantasy Sound, London
- Genres: Post-punk; shoegaze; indie rock
- Length: 50:45
- Labels: Wichita; PIAS
- Producer: Erol Alkan

Ride chronology
Tomorrow's Shore (2018)	This Is Not a Safe Place (2019)	Interplay (2024)

Singles from This Is Not a Safe Place
- 1. "Future Love" Released: 23 April 2019; 2. "Repetition" Released: 2 July 2019; 3. "Clouds of Saint Marie" Released: 13 August 2019

Professional ratings
Aggregate scores
Source	Rating
AnyDecentMusic?	6.8/10
Metacritic	70/100
Review scores
Source	Rating
AllMusic	3/5 stars
Clash	8/10
Consequence of Sound	B−
Exclaim!	6/10
The Irish Times	4/5 stars
Mojo	3/5 stars
NME	4/5 stars
Pitchfork	6.5/10
Q	4/5 stars
Uncut	7/10

This Is Not a Safe Place is the sixth studio album by English rock band Ride. The album was released on 16 August 2019, the date being announced on 23 April 2019 along with the release of the album's first single, "Future Love". The album is the band's second produced by English DJ Erol Alkan.

== Production ==
After seeing on exhibition in 2018, Andy Bell was inspired by the work and thinking of American artist Jean-Michel Basquiat. One symbol that Basquiat incorporated into his work was three slashes '///'. This was based upon historic graffiti markings used by American hobos to indicate an unsafe place. This influenced the album name and cover artwork. Basquiat is also referenced in the lyrics of Repetition.

Bell stated that the album was influenced by the likes of Sonic Youth and the Fall and by "post-punk in general, Siouxsie and the Banshees, Public Image Ltd".

== Track listing ==
All lyrics are written by Andy Bell, except where noted.

This Is Not a Safe Place track listing
No.	Title	Lyrics	Length
1.	"R.I.D.E."	Loz Colbert	3:00
2.	"Future Love"		3:38
3.	"Repetition"		3:16
4.	"Kill Switch"	Colbert; Mark Gardener; Bell	2:44
5.	"Clouds of Saint Marie"		3:54
6.	"Eternal Recurrence"	Gardener	5:48
7.	"Fifteen Minutes"		3:14
8.	"Jump Jet"		5:08
9.	"Dial Up"		3:36
10.	"End Game"		3:36
11.	"Shadows Behind the Sun"	Gardener	4:00
12.	"In This Room"		8:40
Total length:			50:44

== Personnel ==
Ride

- Andy Bell
- Loz Colbert
- Mark Gardener
- Steve Queralt

Additional musician

- Christine Biller – vocal on "R.I.D.E"

Technical personnel

- Erol Alkan – production, engineering (Phantasy Sound)
- Caesar Edmunds – engineering (Assault & Battery), mixing
- Richie Kennedy – engineering (Assault & Battery)
- Chris D'Adda – engineering (Vale)
- Ride – additional recording and production
- Alan Moulder – mixing
- John Davis – mastering

Design

- Matt De Jong – creative direction
- Jamie-James Medina – creative direction
- Vincent Tullo – cover photography
- Julian Hayr – studio photography
- Kalpesh Lathigra – other band photography

== Charts ==
Chart performance for This Is Not a Safe Place
Chart (2019)	Peak position
Australian Albums (ARIA)	78
Belgian Albums (Ultratop Wallonia)	75
French Albums (SNEP)	193
German Albums (Offizielle Top 100)	72
Scottish Albums (Official Charts)	6
Swiss Albums (Schweizer Hitparade)	94
UK Albums (Official Charts)	7
UK Independent Albums (Official Charts)	1
