= Interplay (Ride album) =

Studio album by Ride
- Released: 29 March 2024
- Studio: OX4 (Oxford); Vada (Alcester); Battery (London)
- Genre: Shoegaze; Krautrock; synth-pop
- Length: 58:41
- Label: Wichita
- Producer: Richie Kennedy

Ride chronology
| This Is Not a Safe Place (2019) | Interplay (2024) |

Singles from Interplay
- 1. "Peace Sign" Released: 11 January 2024; 2. "Last Frontier" Released: 15 February 2024; 3. "Monaco" Released: 14 March 2024; 4. "Portland Rocks" Released: 28 March 2024

Interplay is the seventh studio album by English rock band Ride, released on 29 March 2024 through Wichita Recordings. It was written and recorded during the COVID-19 pandemic, and produced by Richie Kennedy, and the first album since 1996's Tarantula not produced by Erol Alkan. The album received positive reviews from critics.

== Critical reception ==
Professional ratings
Aggregate scores
| Source | Rating |
|---|---|
| Metacritic | 78/100 |
Review scores
| Source | Rating |
| AllMusic | 3/5 stars |
| Clash | 8/10 |
| Mojo | 4/5 stars |
| Pitchfork | 6.2/10 |
| Uncut | 8/10 |
| Under the Radar | 9/10 stars |

Interplay received a score of 78 out of 100 on review aggregator Metacritic based on 12 critics' reviews, indicating "generally favorable" reception. Uncut stated that on "Yesterday Is Only a Song" as well as "on the best tunes of Interplay, Ride feel wonderfully, unexpectedly, younger than yesterday", while Mojo found it to be "overall: troubled, unflinching, but tuneful and triumphant".

Robin Murray of Clash called it "perhaps the best album yet of their mighty second arc" as they "embrace and move past their illustrious past, resulting in one of the most finessed, intriguing albums of their career to date". Under the Radar's Dom Gourlay described it as "the masterpiece Ride have been promising since getting back together. The jewel in an already impressive crown, but one that further illustrates Ride as a band looking forwards for inspiration instead of the nostalgia favored by many of their peers". Reviewing the album for Glide Magazine, Doug Collette opined that it is "either a testament to their bond as a band or a flagrant demonstration of an egregious lack of imagination" and observed that it is "difficult to distinguish individual instruments within the ever-so-dense mix of Interplay".

AllMusic's Fred Thomas said that "one of the more notable shifts on the album is how the songwriting looks more to the influence of '80s synth pop than ever before" but felt that it "land[s] more like a collection of ideas being fleshed out than a cohesive album experience". Ben Cardew of Pitchfork commented that "ironically, the shoegaze revivalists often sound considerably more attached to classic Ride than Ride themselves do these days".

== Track listing ==
Interplay track listing
| No. | Title | Writer(s) | Length |
|---|---|---|---|
| 1. | "Peace Sign" | Andy Bell; Ride | 4:38 |
| 2. | "Last Frontier" | Bell; Ride | 4:09 |
| 3. | "Light in a Quiet Room" | Bell; Loz Colbert | 6:02 |
| 4. | "Monaco" | Mark Gardener; Steve Queralt | 4:15 |
| 5. | "I Came to See the Wreck" | Gardener; Queralt | 5:57 |
| 6. | "Stay Free" | Bell | 5:00 |
| 7. | "Last Night I Went Somewhere to Dream" | Bell; Colbert | 4:13 |
| 8. | "Sunrise Chaser" | Gardener; Bell; Queralt | 4:18 |
| 9. | "Midnight Rider" | Bell | 4:23 |
| 10. | "Portland Rocks" | Bell; Queralt | 5:02 |
| 11. | "Essaouira" | Gardener; Ride | 7:10 |
| 12. | "Yesterday Is Just a Song" | Bell | 3:34 |
| Total length: | | | 58:41 |

== Personnel ==
Personnel taken from Interplay liner notes.

Ride

- Andy Bell – guitar, vocals
- Mark Gardener – vocals, guitar, engineering
- Steve Queralt – bass
- Loz Colbert – drums

Additional contributors

- Richie Kennedy – production, engineering, programming
- Ed Farrell – engineering
- Justin Tressider – engineering
- George Perks – assistant engineer
- John Davis – mastering
- Claudius Mittendorfer – mixing
- Cal Bain – graphic design, artwork
- Andreas Brooks – graphic design, artwork
- Cal McIntyre – photography
- Laura Taylor – creative direction

== Charts ==
| Chart (2024) | Peak position |
|---|---|
| Australian Digital Albums (ARIA) | 13 |
| Australian Physical Albums (ARIA) | 23 |
| Belgian Albums (Ultratop Wallonia) | 154 |
| Japanese Hot Albums (Billboard Japan) | 77 |
| Scottish Albums (OCC) | 2 |
| Swiss Albums (Schweizer Hitparade) | 55 |
| UK Albums (OCC) | 8 |
| UK Independent Albums (OCC) | 1 |
