= Leave Them All Behind =

Single by Ride

from the album Going Blank Again
- B-side: "Chrome Waves" "Grasshopper"
- Released: 3 February 1992
- Recorded: May–November 1991
- Studio: Chipping Norton Recording Studios, Chipping Norton; Blackbarn Studios, Ripley
- Genre: Shoegaze; pop
- Length: 8:17
- Label: Creation/Sire
- Composers: Andy Bell, Loz Colbert, Mark Gardener, Steve Queralt
- Lyricist: Mark Gardener
- Producers: Alan Moulder, Ride

Ride singles chronology
"Vapour Trail" (1991)	"Leave Them All Behind" (1992)	"Twisterella" (1992)

"Leave Them All Behind" is a song by the British rock band Ride. It was released on 3 February 1992 as the lead single from the band's second studio album Going Blank Again, of which it is the opening track. The song's lyrics are a confident statement about Ride's musical talent relative to the rest of the shoegaze scene, which is why the band wanted to release it as the album's first single. It features both of the band's singers, Andy Bell and Mark Gardener, on lead vocals.

The song was Ride's most commercially successful single, debuting at No. 9 on the UK Singles Chart, their highest-ever position. It also became the first single released on Creation Records to reach the top ten in the United Kingdom. "Leave Them All Behind" is commonly recognized as one of Ride's best songs as well as one of the greatest accomplishments in the shoegaze genre.

== Background ==
Despite clocking in at an unconventionally long eight minutes and seventeen seconds, Creation Records founder Alan McGee demanded that "Leave Them All Behind" be released as the lead single off of Going Blank Again, leaping out of his chair and "jumping around like a demented gibbon" upon hearing it for the first time, the band recalled. The band agreed that it needed to be the lead single because they felt it was a big statement to send a message to other shoegaze bands about Ride's musical development.

The song begins with a Hammond organ riff, which Bell said was an attempt to emulate the feel of "Won't Get Fooled Again" by The Who. Producer Alan Moulder used a fast click track to cut the organ sound in and out of the studio so that it played intermittently rather than continuously. At that point, the band had yet to record the keyboard part, but Bell said that "it just seemed to magically overlay itself and fit perfectly."

Bell's lead guitar riff was influenced by Johnny Marr's playing on "Get the Message" by the supergroup Electronic. The song's main guitar riff chords developed when the band was under the influence of drugs in Amsterdam doing a jam session during a soundcheck. Drummer Loz Colbert was listening to hip hop, funk and The Who during recording, resulting in a snare-heavy performance containing triplets similar to Keith Moon's which he felt was "cyclical and flowing", fitting the song's nature.

"As much as Ride were four very withdrawn and quiet individuals as people, we had that confidence, that belief, in ourselves. Songs like 'Leave Them All Behind' came purely from that belief to think bigger and think better and move forward rather than be trapped in what was happening already. We were never about trying to ape the sound of our previous records."

— Andy Bell

Gardener wrote the lyrics, which were inspired by Ride's first American tour. Bell was tasked with editing Gardener's lyrics down — "it would’ve been 25 minutes if we’d used all the words", he remarked. "Wheels turning round, into alien ground" was the line that initially stood out to Bell, who decided to begin the song with it. The song's imagery of tour bus wheels turning around turned into a declarative metaphor about Ride's musical progression leaving behind all the rest of the shoegaze scene in comparison.

== Reception ==
"Leave Them All Behind" entered the UK Singles Chart at number nine on 10 February 1992. It became the first single released on Creation Records to reach the top ten in the United Kingdom. The Guardian noted that, "Incredibly, that same week the Jesus and Mary Chain's "Reverence" was at 10 and Primal Scream's Dixie-Narco EP was at 11. Did someone say golden era?"

The success took the band by surprise. "It was a nine minutes long wall of sound with no edit whatsoever, which meant no radio play either and it's landed in the top ten! You do feel vindicated at that point," Bell said. He called it "the high point of Ride's career" but still believed that the band as a whole fell short of reaching their goals of topping the charts while pushing musical boundaries as far as possible.

Ride intended for their follow-up single "Twisterella" to be the band's big breakthrough hit, but it underperformed, peaking only at No. 36 in the UK as the band never was able to recreate the success of "Leave Them All Behind" on the charts.

== Legacy ==
"Leave Them All Behind" was universally acclaimed by critics. BrooklynVegan called it " one of the great album-openers—and set-openers—of all time." Pitchfork wrote, "Every single element of 'Leave Them All Behind' is voluminous, but not just in sheer loudness: It's overwhelming, not oppressive, and the sonic expanse is even more mindblowing with this remastering job. Bell and Gardener's barnstorming guitars, Steve Queralt's girder-thick bassline, and Colbert's Moon-sized drum fills all could fill canyons individually, yet never once does it sound like something other than four guys in a room."

In 2014, NME placed it at No. 273 on its list of the 500 Greatest Songs of All Time.

== Charts ==
Chart performance for "Leave Them All Behind"
Chart (1992)	Peak position
Australia (ARIA)	89
UK Singles (OCC)	9
UK Indie (Music Week)	1
US Alternative Airplay (Billboard)	20
