= The Kynd =

English indie rock and Britpop band

- Origin: Chalfont St Peter, England
- Genres: Indie rock; Britpop
- Years active: 1991–2000, 2021–present
- Labels: Go-Go Girl/MGR Records, Philter Records
- Members: Paul King; Danny Tipping; Tristan Tipping
- Past members: Bradley Hills; Richard Elson

The Kynd (/kaɪnd/ kind) are an English indie rock band from Chalfont St Peter, Buckinghamshire, that formed in 1991 and were professionally active from 1996 to 2000, and then reformed in 2021. The Kynd were part of the Britpop scene during the 1990s and released two singles and an album during that period.

== Career ==
The Kynd were formed in Chalfont St Peter, Buckinghamshire in 1991. The band consisted of Paul King (vocals), Danny Tipping (guitar), Tristan Tipping (bass), and Bradley Hills (drums). The Kynd's name was taken from the writings of horror author H. P. Lovecraft and appealed to the group because it echoed the deliberate misspelling of 60s band names like the Byrds, the Monkees and the Beatles.

The band had early success when they won DJ Gary Crowley's Demo Clash competition on GLR Radio for three consecutive weeks in early 1992. Crowley described the band's sound as "a gorgeous slice of Bucks' beat" and continued to publicly champion the Kynd until their breakup.

The band signed to the independent record label Go-Go Girl/MGR Records in 1995 and set about recording their debut single, "Egotripper", with Ride guitarist and future member of Oasis Andy Bell producing. "Egotripper" was released in October 1996, garnering moderate airplay and press coverage. The band's second single, "World's Finest", appeared in March 1997 and received more radio play than its predecessor, reaching the Top 10 of the UK Indie Chart.

In 1998, Richard Elson joined the band on keyboards, just in time to participate in the recording sessions for the band's self-produced debut album, Shakedown. The album was released in February 1999 and although it failed to chart, it sold steadily throughout the year and received favorable reviews in the music press, being selected as Album of the Month in both Kerrang! and Front magazines. A third single, "Get What You Deserve", was prepared for release in 1999, but it was shelved due to financial issues and inter-personnel problems within the band. The Kynd broke up acrimoniously in 2000.

In January 2021, the Kynd announced on their social media that they had reformed for live dates and to record their "long lost" second album. The shelved single version of "Get What You Deserve" was issued digitally in April 2021 to coincide with the band's reunion.

The Kynd should not be confused with the 1960s South African beat group of the same name.

== Discography ==
=== Albums ===
- Shakedown (1999)
- Timelines (2023)

=== Singles ===
- "Egotripper" (1996)
- "World's Finest" (1997)
- "Get What You Deserve" (2021)
- "Whispers & Tones" (2022)
- "Older" (2023)
- "Sunrise: Reprise" (2023)
- "Saturn Eyes" (2023)
