= Black Nite Crash =

Single by Ride

from the album Tarantula
- B-side: "Nothing Lasts Forever"; "Slave"; "A Trip Down Ronnie Lane"
- Released: 12 February 1996
- Recorded: London 1995
- Genre: Garage rock
- Length: 2:34
- Label: Creation
- Songwriter(s): Andy Bell; Loz Colbert; Mark Gardener; Steve Queralt

Ride singles chronology
"I Don't Know Where It Comes From" (1994)	"Black Nite Crash" (1996)	"Charm Assault" (2017)

"Black Nite Crash" is a single by English shoegazing band Ride, from their album Tarantula. It reached number 67 on the UK Singles Chart on 24 February 1996. The single was released shortly before the band's break up, and was awarded single of the week by the weekly music magazine Melody Maker.

== Track listing ==
All tracks are written by Andy Bell except where noted

12-inch (CRE 199T)
No.	Title	Length
1.	"Black Nite Crash"	2:34
2.	"Nothing Lasts Forever"	3:31
3.	"Slave" (Mark Gardener)	3:50
4.	"A Trip Down Ronnie Lane"	3:37

CD (CRESCD 199)
No.	Title	Length
1.	"Black Nite Crash"	2:34
2.	"Nothing Lasts Forever"	3:31
3.	"Slave" (Mark Gardener)	3:50
4.	"A Trip Down Ronnie Lane"	3:37

- Track 4 features a short untitled bonus track after "A Trip Down Ronnie Lane" and 11:08 of silence. The track, which is approximately 0:23 in duration uses the same tune as "Wilmot" by Sabres of Paradise (a single from 1994), which in turn uses a sample of a track from 1931 by Wilmoth Houdini entitled "Black But Sweet"

== Personnel ==
Ride

- Loz Colbert – drums
- Steve Queralt – bass guitar
- Mark Gardener – vocals, rhythm guitar
- Andy Bell – vocals, lead guitar

Additional musicians

- Nick Moorbath – piano, Rhodes, Hammond
- Jeff Scantlebury – percussion

Technical personnel

- negativespace – design
- Paul Motion – engineering
- Richard "Digby" Smith – producer
- Mark Freegard – mixing
