= Goldrush (band) =

English rock band

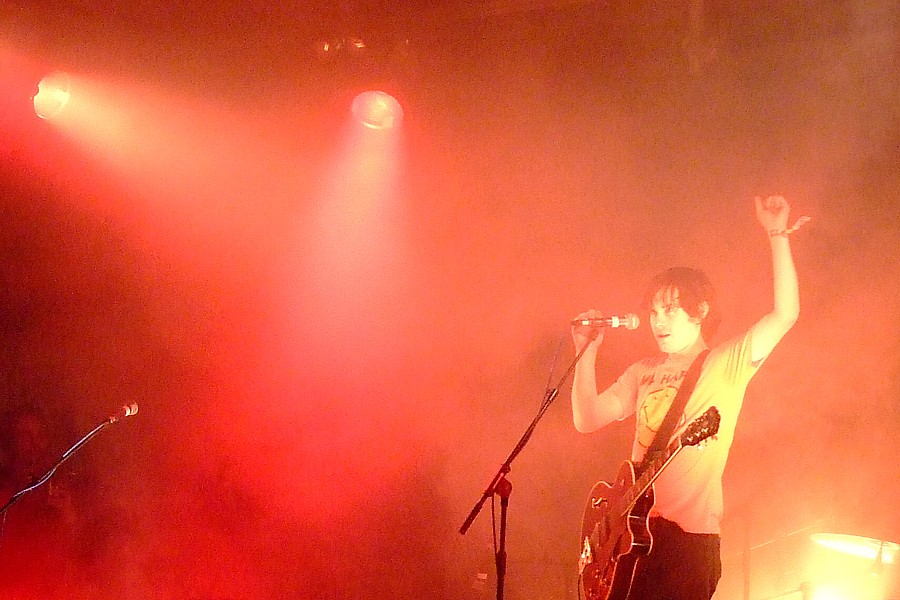
- Goldrush performing at Truck Festival in 2007

Background information
- Origin: Oxford, England
- Genres: Alternative rock; Americana
- Labels: Truck Records; Virgin Records; Low Transit Industries; City Slang
- Members: Robin Bennett; Joe Bennett; Garo Nahoulakian; Nick "Growler" Fowler; Graham Roby
- Past members: Jef Clayton

Goldrush were a rock band from Oxfordshire, England. Their music has been compared to earlier artists Nick Drake and The Band, as well as music from The Flaming Lips and Grandaddy. The band centres on brothers Robin (vocals, guitar) and Joe (keyboards, guitar, vocals) Bennett. The other members are Garo Nahoulakian (lead guitar), Nick "Growler" Fowler (bass) and Graham Roby (drums). Original bassist Jef Clayton left the band in 2003.

== History ==
Goldrush were formed by Robin Bennett, Joe Bennett and Jef Clayton in the late 1990s under the name Whispering Bob, after the DJ "Whispering" Bob Harris, who frontman Robin once served while working in the local SPAR shop. After releasing the mini album Another Fine Mess on their own Truck Records label, they changed their name to Goldrush, and soon after were signed to Virgin Records in August 2001. Their first full-length album, Don't Bring Me Down, appeared in 2002, but the band was dropped by Virgin later that year. In 2004, the EP Ozona was released on Truck (named after the town of Ozona, Texas where the band once broke down on tour). This was followed by an album-length version on Better Looking Records in the United States.

The band have collaborated with former Ride singer Mark Gardener, serving as his backing band when performing live, and on his album These Beautiful Ghosts. Robin, Joe and Garo also play in Danny and the Champions of the World with Danny George Wilson of Grand Drive.

Truck Festival

Inspired by Woodstock The Movie, the Bennett brothers also run the annual Truck Festival along with friends and family at Hill Farm, Steventon, Oxfordshire. The festival began in 1998 and was opened by Garo's first band Merlin.

== Discography ==
=== Albums ===
- Don't Bring Me Down (Virgin Records/Truck Records, 2002) - UK #99
- Extended Play (Truck Records, 2002)
- Ozona (album) (Better Looking Records; Low Transit Industries; City Slang, 2005)
- The Heart Is The Place (Truck Records; Low Transit Industries; City Slang, 2007)

=== Singles & EPs ===
- "Same Picture" (Truck Records, 2001) - UK #64
- "Love Is Here" (Virgin Records/Truck Records, 2001)
- Pioneers EP (Virgin Records/Truck Records, 2002) - UK #85
- "Same Picture" [Re-release] (Virgin Records/Truck Records, 2002)
- "Wide Open Sky" (Virgin Records/Truck Records, 2002) - UK #70
- Falling Out into the Night EP [A joint EP with Mark Gardener] (Truck Records, 2003)
- Ozona (EP) (Truck Records, 2004) produced by Rob Campanella
