= Nowhere (album) =

Studio album by Ride
- Released: 15 October 1990
- Studios: Blackwing, London
- Genres: Shoegaze; neo-psychedelia; noise pop
- Length: 38:56 (vinyl & MC); 52:12 (CD)
- Label: Creation
- Producer: Marc Waterman

Ride chronology
Fall (1990)	Nowhere (1990)	Today Forever (1991)

Singles from Nowhere
- 1. "Vapour Trail" Released: 1 April 1991 (U.S. only); 2. "Kaleidoscope" Released: 1991 (U.S. only)

Nowhere is the debut album by British shoegaze band Ride, released on 15 October 1990. It has been acclaimed as one of the greatest albums of the shoegaze genre.

== Background and production ==
Prior to the release of Nowhere, Ride had previously released three EPs, a self-titled EP, Play, and Fall; subsequent reissues of the album have featured songs from these EPs, especially its 20th anniversary edition in 2011. Nowhere was recorded with and partially produced by Marc Waterman, who backed out of the sessions, resulting in Alan Moulder mixing the final album.

The band members were between 18 and 20 during the recording of Nowhere. Mark Gardener described it as a "nighttime sort of record", and recalled the band working on the album in the studio during late-night hours and long sessions. He said feelings of isolation in the album's music resulted from this work pattern. Gardener said “It all added to that dark, alienated feeling that I think permeated through Nowhere.”

Both Bell and Gardener used the Roland GP-16 multi effects unit to create various tones on the record, including tremolo on "Polar Bear", and modulation on "Vapour Trail". According to Guitar.com the unit helped to create the record's "jangly cloud", in conjunction with the use of pedals that were core to shoegaze as it was developing.

== Music ==
Samantha Lopez of Paste described Ride as "a collection of reverberated songs that stand effortlessly posed between digestible pop songs and sonic, intense noise-rock." Jason Heller of Pitchfork explains: "Nowhere reflects much of the indie environment that reverberated around them, including Sonic Youth’s distorted meltdowns, the Stone Roses’ jangly-psychedelia, and the chiming nightscapes of the Cure’s Disintegration—not to mention a huge dose of inspiration from Ride’s Creation Records labelmates My Bloody Valentine. But unlike MBV, who were in the midst of resequencing the DNA of guitar-centric indie rock, Nowhere harbors a deep strain of classic rock reverence, from the Paul McCartney-esque bassline of 'Seagull' to the 'When the Levee Breaks'-like stomp of 'Dreams Burn Down.' Mix in 'Vapour Trail,' the disc’s melancholy, violin- and cello-laced anthem to post-adolescent romanticism, and Nowhere stands elegantly poised between pop traditionalism, gently devastating songwriting, choirboy harmonies, and the most harrowing sonic overdoses in shoegaze."

== Artwork ==
The album cover features an uncrested wave photographed by Warren Bolster, known more for his work photographing skateboarders and snowboarders. The original LP cover artwork had the band name in embossed text centered in the upper half and an embossed album title in the lower right corner. The inner sleeve in the LP, or the liner notes in the CD, featured a text montage of lyrics from each song on the album. The original cassette and CD releases featured no band name or album title on the cover, but sometimes came with an identifying sticker on the outside of the CD or cassette case. For the 2001 CD re-release, the band name and title were printed visibly on the cover in the locations of the LP's embossed text. The 2011 Rhino Handmade edition features a lenticular design of the wave.

== Release ==
Nowhere was released by Creation Records on 15 October 1990. The album was issued in the United States in December 1990 by Sire Records.

A 2001 reissue by Ignition Records further added the four songs from the band's Today Forever EP as bonus tracks.

In February 2011, Rhino Handmade released a special 20th anniversary edition of Nowhere, featuring the remastered original album with seven bonus tracks from the band's previous EPs, plus a bonus disc featuring a previously unreleased live performance at The Roxy in Los Angeles recorded on 10 April 1991. The set also includes a 40-page booklet with exclusive photos and a new essay by music critic Jim DeRogatis, as well as a lenticular-covered digipak book.

In November 2015, the band released a special 25th anniversary edition of Nowhere across two separate formats: a CD/DVD set, and a coloured-vinyl double LP. The CD features the same audio material as the 2001 and 2011 reissues remastered, with a DVD featuring a previously unreleased live performance at Town and Country Club in London on 7 March 1991. The discs come in a hardback cardboard case with canvas-style cover and a 36-page booklet. The 2LP version features an expanded track listing with 7 bonus tracks from the Fall and Today Forever EPs, and was pressed on white and blue marbled colour vinyl. The reissue was released independently. In conjunction with the re-release, the band performed the album in its entirety at a series of live shows in October 2015. Nowhere was re-released again in November 2022 by Wichita Recordings, with the reissue charting at number 62 on the UK Albums Chart.

== Critical reception ==
Professional ratings
Review scores
Source	Rating
AllMusic	4.5/5 stars
The A.V. Club	A
Chicago Tribune	3/4 stars
Entertainment Weekly	B
Mojo	4/5 stars
NME	7/10
Pitchfork	9.5/10
Record Mirror	4/5
Select	5/5
Uncut	8/10

Reviewer Chris Roberts of Melody Maker hailed it as "breathtaking". Noting the "huge burden of expectation" placed on Ride's first full-length album after three acclaimed EPs, Select critic Andrew Perry deemed Nowhere a "phenomenal" debut and praised the band's "heaven-sent melodic gift" and avoidance of "formularisation". Record Mirror's Chris Sharratt called Ride "undoubtedly the present day kings of the indie guitar empire" and found that the album justified the "media hype" around the band. In a more ambivalent review for NME, Simon Williams wrote that only "two-thirds of Nowhere sublimely reaffirms our faith", and that the album "fails – unluckily – to gel as a Great Album should. It doesn't challenge or thrill unexpectedly."

Retrospectively, Nowhere has been acclaimed as one of the greatest albums of the shoegaze genre. David Bevan of Pitchfork described Nowhere as one of shoegaze's "indisputable masterpieces" and "one of shoegazing's enduring moments" and Andy Kellman of AllMusic said that the album exemplified the genre at its "most exciting and mastered", while also being "Ride's zenith". Rolling Stone called the album "a masterpiece" while discussing to the band post-reformation.

Nowhere was ranked at number 74 on Pitchfork's 2003 list of the top 100 albums of the 1990s, and at number 277 on Spin's 2015 list of "The 300 Best Albums of the Past 30 Years". It is also included in the book 1001 Albums You Must Hear Before You Die. The track "Vapour Trail" was named the 145th best song of the 1990s by Pitchfork in 2010, and the 81st best song of the 1990s by NME in 2012.

== Track listing ==
All tracks are written by Ride.

No.	Title	Lead vocals	Length
1.	"Seagull"	Gardener and Bell	6:10
2.	"Kaleidoscope"	Gardener with Bell	3:00
3.	"In a Different Place"	Gardener	5:30
4.	"Polar Bear"	Gardener	4:45
5.	"Dreams Burn Down"	Gardener	6:04
6.	"Decay" (Mark Gardener)	Gardener	3:35
7.	"Paralysed"	Bell	5:34
8.	"Vapour Trail"	Bell	4:18

CD bonus tracks
No.	Title	Lead vocals	Length
9.	"Taste" (Mark Gardener)	Gardener	3:17
10.	"Here and Now"	Bell	4:26
11.	"Nowhere" (Loz Colbert)	Bell	5:23

Reissue bonus tracks (Today Forever EP)
No.	Title	Lyrics	Lead vocals	Length
12.	"Unfamiliar"	Gardener	Gardener and Bell	5:03
13.	"Sennen"		Gardener and Bell	4:23
14.	"Beneath"		Gardener and Bell	4:06
15.	"Today"		Gardener and Bell	6:26

Bonus disc: Live at the Roxy, 10 April 1991
No.	Title	Lyrics	Length
1.	"Polar Bear" (Live)		5:01
2.	"Seagull" (Live)		5:51
3.	"Unfamiliar" (Live)	Gardener	4:42
4.	"Dreams Burn Down" (Live)		5:28
5.	"Like a Daydream" (Live)		2:46
6.	"Vapour Trail" (Live)		3:36
7.	"In a Different Place" (Live)		5:30
8.	"Perfect Time" (Live)	Gardener	3:26
9.	"Taste" (Live)	Gardener	3:27
10.	"Nowhere" (Live)	Colbert	8:26
11.	"Chelsea Girl" (Live)	Gardener	4:34
12.	"Drive Blind" (Live)		6:59

== Personnel ==
Ride

- Mark Gardener
- Andy Bell
- Steve Queralt
- Loz Colbert

Technical

- Marc Waterman – recording
- Alan Moulder – mixing at Swanyard Studios, London
- Nick Webb – remastering (Abbey Road Studios)
- Joe Dilworth – band photography
- Warren Bolster – wave photography

== Charts ==
Chart (1990–1991)	Peak position
Australian Albums (ARIA)	104
UK Albums (Official Charts)	11

Chart (2022)	Peak position
Scottish Albums (Official Charts)	12
UK Independent Albums (Official Charts)	6

== Certifications ==
Region	Certification	Certified units/sales
United Kingdom (BPI)	Silver	60,000^{^}
^{^} Shipments figures based on certification alone.
