= Carnival of Light (album) =

Studio album by Ride
- Released: 20 June 1994
- Studio: Sawmills, The Manor, RAK, Abbey Road, Sound City, Ocean Way, Sunset Sound
- Genre: Britpop; garage rock; psychedelic pop; folk rock
- Length: 56:33
- Label: Creation
- Producer: John Leckie

Ride chronology
Grasshopper (1992)	Carnival of Light (1994)	Tarantula (1996)

Singles from Carnival of Light
- 1. "Birdman" Released: 18 April 1994; 2. "How Does It Feel to Feel?" Released: 13 June 1994; 3. "I Don't Know Where It Comes From" Released: 12 September 1994

Professional ratings
Review scores
Source	Rating
AllMusic	3/5 stars
Melody Maker	(positive)
NME	7/10
Select	4/5 stars
Vox	8/10

Carnival of Light is the third studio album by British rock band Ride, released in June 1994 via Creation Records. The album is named after a lost song by the Beatles. The album showcased the band's shift from shoegazing to a more traditional, folk rock sound. It was well received by some critics, magazine Select calling it "another fantastic British album in the old tradition" and reached the UK Top 5. However, by the end of 1994 even the band members had become disillusioned, referring to it amongst themselves as "Carnival of Shite", although in a 2022 interview Andy Bell stated that he had "made peace with it. It's got a lot of good tracks, like Moonlight Medicine and Birdman".

== Track listing ==
Original album
No.	Title	Writer(s)	Lead vocals	Length
1.	"Moonlight Medicine"	Mark Gardener	Gardener	6:49
2.	"1000 Miles"	Gardener	Gardener with Andy Bell	5:00
3.	"From Time to Time"	Gardener (lyrics & music), Steve Queralt (music)	Gardener and Bell	5:05
4.	"Natural Grace"	Loz Colbert	Gardener and Bell	4:40
5.	"Only Now"	Gardener (lyrics & music), Jack Rieley (lyrics)	Gardener	4:25
6.	"Birdman"	Bell	Bell	6:39
7.	"Crown of Creation"	Bell	Bell	4:41
8.	"How Does It Feel to Feel?" (The Creation cover)	Eddie Phillips, Bob Garner	Gardener and Bell	3:40
9.	"Endless Road"	Bell	Bell	3:30
10.	"Magical Spring"	Bell	Bell with Gardener	4:25
11.	"Rolling Thunder"	Bell	instrumental	2:08
12.	"I Don't Know Where It Comes From"	Bell	Bell	5:32
Total length:				56:33

Bonus tracks
No.	Title	Writer(s)	Lead vocals	Length
1.	"Don't Let It Die"	Gardener	Gardener	3:12
2.	"Let's Get Lost"	Bell	Gardener and Bell	3:56
3.	"At the End of the Universe"	Bell, Colbert, Gardener, Queralt	Gardener and Bell	7:55

== Personnel ==
Ride

- Loz Colbert – drums, percussion
- Steve Queralt – bass, Fender Rhodes on "Only Now"
- Mark Gardener – vocals, rhythm guitar, tamboura
- Andy Bell – vocals, lead guitar; piano on "Crown of Creation", "Endless Road", and "Magical Spring"; Hammond organ on "Crown of Creation" and "Endless Road", Fender Rhodes on "From Time to Time"

Additional musicians

- Jon Lord – Hammond organ on "Moonlight Medicine"
- Electra Strings – strings on "Moonlight Medicine", "1000 Miles", "From Time to Time", and "Only Now"
- Kick Horns – horns on "Endless Road" and "Let's Get Lost"
- Simon Whalley & The Christchurch Cathedral School Choir – choir on "I Don't Know Where It Comes From"

Production

- John Leckie – production (all except "How Does It Feel to Feel?"), mixing (all except "How Does It Feel to Feel?" and "Crown of Creation")
- George Drakoulias – production and mixing on "How Does It Feel to Feel?"
- Andy Bell – mixing on "Crown of Creation"
- Stephen Marcussen – mastering
- John Cornfield – engineering
- Julie Gardener – engineering
- Nigel Godrich – engineering
- Chris Brown – engineering
- Jim Scott – engineering
- Tom Nellen – engineering

Artwork

- Gered Mankowitz – cover photo
- Tom Sheehan – other photos
- Ride – design
- Mark Brown – design

== Charts ==
Chart performance for Carnival of Light
Chart (1994)	Peak position
Australian Albums (ARIA)	32
New Zealand Albums (RMNZ)	38
Scottish Albums (OCC)	15
Swedish Albums (Sverigetopplistan)	24
UK Albums (OCC)	5

Chart (2023)	Peak position
Scottish Albums (OCC)	22
UK Independent Albums (OCC)	8
