= Smile (Ride album) =

Compilation album by Ride
- Released: July 1990
- Genre: Shoegaze
- Length: 31:09
- Label: Sire
- Producer: Ride

Ride chronology
Play (1990)	Smile (1990)	Fall (1990)

Professional ratings
Review scores
Source	Rating
AllMusic	4/5 stars

Smile is an album by British rock band Ride. It is a compilation of Ride's first two EPs, Ride and Play, both of which were originally released in the first half of 1990. The album was first released by Sire Records in July 1990 for the North American market, in lieu of the two original British EPs. Two years later, on 23 November 1992, it was released in the UK.

== Track listing ==
No.	Title	Lyrics	Music	Lead vocals	Length
1.	"Chelsea Girl"	Mark Gardener	Andy Bell, Loz Colbert, Gardener, Steve Queralt	Gardener with Bell	2:58
2.	"Drive Blind"	Bell	Bell	Gardener	4:45
3.	"All I Can See"	Gardener	Gardener	Gardener and Bell	3:24
4.	"Close My Eyes"	Bell	Bell	Gardener	5:27
5.	"Like a Daydream"	Bell	Bell	Gardener	3:06
6.	"Silver"	Bell	Bell	Bell	4:10
7.	"Furthest Sense"	Gardener	Bell, Colbert, Gardener, Queralt	Gardener	3:24
8.	"Perfect Time"	Gardener	Bell, Colbert, Gardener, Queralt	Gardener and Bell	3:52
Total length:					31:09

== Charts ==
Weekly chart performance for Smile
Chart (1990)	Peak position
Australian Albums (ARIA)	135
