= Live Reading Festival 1992 =

Professional ratings
Review scores
Source	Rating
Allmusic	3/5 stars

Live Reading Festival 1992 is a recording of Ride's main stage set at the 1992 Reading Festival on Saturday 29 August. It was released as the third disc of the 2001 Box Set along with OX4 The Best of Ride and Firing Blanks: Unreleased Ride Recordings 1988–95.

== Track listing ==
1. "Leave Them All Behind" - 9:38
2. "Taste" - 3:19
3. "Not Fazed" - 3:28
4. "Sennen" - 3:58
5. "Like a Daydream" - 2:40
6. "Twisterella" - 3:41
7. "Time of Her Time" - 2:59
8. "Nowhere" - 11:21
9. "Vapour Trail" - 3:38
10. "Seagull" - 7:49
11. "Close My Eyes" - 5:33
12. "Mouse Trap" -5.11
