= Cheney School =

Location
- Cheney Lane; Oxford, Oxfordshire, OX3 7QH; England; 51°45′11″N 1°13′20″W

Information
- Type: Comprehensive; Academy
- Motto: Think for yourself; act for others
- Established: 1797; 229 years ago
- Department for Education URN: 139146 Tables
- Ofsted: Reports
- Headteacher: Rob Pavey
- Gender: Coeducational
- Age: 11 to 18
- Enrolment: 1700
- Houses: Turing, Mandela, Seacole, Yousafzai & Hawking
- Colours: Maroon, white, grey
- Website: www.cheneyschool.org

Cheney School is a comprehensive secondary school and sixth form with academy status, located in Headington, Oxford, England. It serves the Headington and East Oxford area as a destination for students from primary schools across the city. The headteacher has been Rob Pavey since 2020. Cheney School is part of River Learning Trust.

== History ==
The foundation was around 1797. It then moved to New Inn Hall Street in 1901 under the name of Oxford Central Girls School. The building it occupied at that time is now part of St Peter's College of Oxford University. Eventually the school became Cheney Girls' School. The Junior Day Department of the Oxford Technical College moved to the same site under the name Cheney School, a separate, mixed secondary technical school. For four years, between 1957 and 1961 boys only were admitted (Cheney Boys School) after which girls were again admitted from 1962. Together they were usually known as Cheney Mixed. In 1972 the two schools merged to form the new mixed comprehensive school, Cheney School. In 2003, Cheney School changed from being upper school, for children aged 13 to 18, to a secondary school serving children aged 11 to 18, in the two tier system. In January 2013, the school became an academy as part of the Cheney School Academy Trust. The Trust was renamed to Community Schools Alliance Trust in 2017. The trust ran into significant financial difficulty leading to accusations of mismanagement by trust CEO Jolie Kirby. Cheney (along with Barton Park and Bayards Hill primary schools, the two other schools which made up the Community Schools Academy Trust) joined River Learning Trust in 2022. Robert Pavey is currently the headteacher.

== Students ==
The school has over 1700 pupils, aged 11–18.

== Specialist status ==
When the UK government began awarding grants to schools specialising in areas of the curriculum, Cheney School decided to become a Language College. Using the grant money, they built a language computer laboratory and added extra in-classroom IT equipment.

Cheney School was awarded a second specialism and picked Student Leadership, which enables more "Student Leaders" (mostly in sports and languages), and concentrates primarily on the student voice.

Cheney School is host to and also partner organisation for the Iris Community Classics Centre which is founded and run by The Iris Project.

Cheney School became the first school in the UK to host a museum working within the Arts Council Accreditation scheme, the Rumble Museum, in May 2015.

== Notable former students ==
- Andy Bell – bass guitarist of Oasis, singer, guitarist and songwriter of Ride
- Mark Gardener – singer, guitarist and songwriter of Ride
- Steve Queralt – bassist, synths and songwriter of Ride
- Emily Berrington – actress
- Bryony Shaw – Olympic windsurfer
- Roy Thomason – former Conservative MP
- Clive Walker – footballer for Chelsea FC and Sunderland
- Danny Dorling – Halford Mackinder Professor of Geography at Oxford University
- Adam Lee – songwriter producer keyboard player of Let Loose, Skin Games making history as the first musicians to perform in Romania after the revolution
- Fiona Twycross – Parliamentary Under-Secretary of State for Gambling

== Buildings ==
Blocks are often referred to by the first initial (e.g. L block, C block, F block).

- Chadwick (English, Art, PE Offices) including the "Drama Dome" (recently changed to host the school's Single Point of Access or SPA)
- Wainright (Science, Maths, school library, reception)
- Ford (Maths, one RE classroom) (Named after the Oxford Maths teaching legend Derek Ford who has taught in Oxford for 50 years)
- Lane (History, Geography, Languages, RE, Economics, Business, Philosophy, Politics)
- John Brookes (DT, ICT, Drama)
- Russell (Science, Maths)
- Sports Hall/Gymnasium (PE)
- Brighouse (Science, Maths, PD) (Opened in November 2016, named after Sir Tim Brighouse)
- Music is attached to the Assembly Hall and the Community Hall
