= Pinball Wanderer =

Studio album by Andy Bell
- Released: 28 February 2025
- Length: 37:59
- Label: Sonic Cathedral
- Producer: Andy Bell

Andy Bell chronology
Tidal Love Numbers (2023)	Pinball Wanderer (2025)

Pinball Wanderer is the fifth studio album by British musician and songwriter Andy Bell. It was released on 28 February 2025 via Sonic Cathedral in LP, CD and digital formats.

== Critical reception ==
Professional ratings
Aggregate scores
Source	Rating
Metacritic	83/100
Review scores
Source	Rating
AllMusic	4/5 stars
Clash	7/10
MusicOMH	3.5/5 stars
Spill	4/5 stars

According to the review aggregator Metacritic, Pinball Wanderer received "universal acclaim" based on a weighted average score of 83 out of 100 from 7 critic scores.

Writing for the Quietus, Jonathan Wright remarked, "As the circular guitar patterns of the instrumental title track give way to the synths of 'Music Concrete' and then the slight and brief but atmospheric 'The Notes You Never Hear', there's a hint the LP may be meandering too much." In a four-star review for AllMusic, Fred Thomas noted it as "a collection of eight freshly minted, mostly newly written tracks," stating "the essence that Bell distills on Pinball Wanderer is one of happy exploration, indeed wandering from one creative idea to the next with very little second-guessing or restraint."

Spill described it as "loads of fun with plenty of wonderfully charming experimentation and interplanetary vibes," giving it four stars. Writing for MusicOMH, John Murphy assigned the album a rating of 3.5 stars and referred to it as "an album of moods and grooves rather than hooks, much of Pinball Wanderer shows just what Bell can produce when he's given a rare spotlight." Rating the album seven, Clash's Richard Bowes stated, "As a musician, Andy Bell has always channelled other-worldly atmospherics, but on Pinball Wanderer he's operating in a separate, groovy, dimension."

== Track listing ==
All tracks are written by Andy Bell, except "I'm in Love" (written by Barbara Gogan, Clive Timperley, David Agar, and Richard Williams).

Pinball Wanderer track listing
No.	Title	Length
1.	"Panic Attack"	4:08
2.	"I'm in Love..." (with Dot Allison and Michael Rother)	4:50
3.	"Madder Lake Deep"	2:09
4.	"Apple Green UFO"	8:21
5.	"Pinball Wanderer"	4:33
6.	"Music Concrete"	5:16
7.	"The Notes You Never Hear"	1:58
8.	"Space Station Mantra"	5:44
Total length:		37:59

=== Note ===
- "I'm in Love..." is a cover of "I'm in Love with a German Film Star, performed by the Passions.

== Personnel ==
Credits adapted from the album's liner notes.

- Andy Bell – performance, production
- Gem Archer – additional production
- Dot Allison – vocals on "I'm in Love..."
- Stuart Hamilton – recording and engineering for Dot Allison on "I'm in Love..."
- Michael Rother – guitar on "I'm in Love..."
- Anthony Ryan – mastering
- Marc Jones – sleeve design
- Perou – photography

== Charts ==
Chart performance for Pinball Wanderer
Chart (2025)	Peak position
Scottish Albums (Official Charts)	28
UK Album Downloads (Official Charts)	14
UK Independent Albums (Official Charts)	4
