= Going Blank Again =

Studio album by Ride
- Released: 9 March 1992
- Studio: Chipping Norton Recording Studios, Chipping Norton; Blackbarn Studios, Ripley
- Genre: Shoegaze; psychedelic rock
- Length: 50:24
- Label: Creation/Sire
- Producer: Alan Moulder, Ride

Ride chronology
Today Forever (1991)	Going Blank Again (1992)	Grasshopper (1992)

Singles from Going Blank Again
- 1. "Leave Them All Behind" Released: 3 February 1992; 2. "Twisterella" Released: 13 April 1992

Going Blank Again is the second studio album by English rock band Ride, released on 9 March 1992 on Creation Records. It was produced by Alan Moulder, and peaked at No. 5 in the UK Albums Chart. In October 2009 the album was certified gold by the British Phonographic Industry for sales of over 100,000 units.

== Background and production ==
Following Ride's 1990 debut album Nowhere, Ride released Going Blank Again as their second full-length record, accompanied by the singles "Leave Them All Behind" (10 February 1992) and "Twisterella" (13 April 1992), the latter named in reference to a song in the 1963 kitchen sink drama Billy Liar. The album consists of ten tracks, selected from twenty-five that the band had recorded.

It has been said that Going Blank Again resembles the band's debut album but also drawing comparisons to the power-pop style of Teenage Fanclub who were Creation Records labelmates of Ride, although it is pointed out that Ride's vocals are more layered, and that the guitars are not as sharp and cutting as those of similar bands of the same era, whilst retaining the reverberating sound that was typical of the shoegaze sound. The album's lyrics have been criticised, but overall this was not seen as an important factor for the album given the nature of shoegaze.

The band credit Christopher Gunson with creating the cover art for the album.

== Music ==
Ben Cardew of Pitchfork explains that Going Blank Again "represents the commercial peak of shoegaze, a glorious explosion of populist noise that proves how utterly satisfying distorted guitars can be when allied with Byrds-ian harmonies, a drummer at the top of his Keith Moon-goes-indie game, and bass lines you can hum in the shower. Going Blank Again sounds like someone has taken the wistful charm of Ride’s debut album Nowhere, fed it three solid meals, and packed it off to finishing school to be sharpened within an inch of its life."

The track “Leave Them All Behind” has been called "a monstrously intrepid, eight-minute slice of thrilling guitars."

== Release ==
The album was re-released on 24 September 2001 featuring four bonus tracks on the Ignition label in the United Kingdom. The four tracks were compiled from the two CD singles released from the album, "Leave Them All Behind" and "Twisterella". This omitted the original mix of "Chrome Waves", as found on the "Leave Them All Behind" CD single in February 1992 and the "Grasshopper" compilation EP in Japan in November of that year. On 30 March 2012, a 20th Anniversary reissue of the album was announced, featuring the same track listing as the 2001 reissue, plus a bonus DVD of the band's 27/3/92 Brixton Academy concert, previously only released on VHS and LaserDisc, which had been out of print. According to a recent newsletter to fans, tracking down the original master of the video was no easy task:

After quite a lengthy stint of detective work, we managed to track down the original digital master tape of the Brixton live show. And it looks great! So we asked Catherine Marks and John Catlin at Alan Moulder's studio to mix the audio afresh from the 2″ master tapes of the gig. Catherine had worked under Alan's watchful eye on the Roxy LA mixes and so we were really happy that she could find time to mix and edit the Brixton audio. Needless to say, it sounds truly wonderful and we’re really pleased to now finally have a Ride release on DVD.

Going Blank Again was re-issued in November 2022 by Wichita recordings. All the original audio reworked and refined, the reissue made available on vinyl and CD.

== Reception and legacy ==
Professional ratings
Review scores
Source	Rating
AllMusic	4/5 stars
Chicago Tribune	4/4 stars
Entertainment Weekly	B+
Los Angeles Times	2.5/4 stars
NME	9/10
Pitchfork	8.7/10
Q	4/5 stars
Select	5/5
Uncut	7/10
The Village Voice	A−

Reviewing the album at the time, British music weekly NME noted that they did not have high hopes for Going Blank Again but that Ride "did the business" and restored the magazine's faith in the band, noting particularly that they had taken on board a diverse set of influences and developed their sound:

This LP has some top punk rock bass guitar on it! Some new effects pedals! New ideas! It is not Going Nowhere Again which is the album we feared they'd make. Instead, GBA fills in the lines between Ride's beauty with cement and then builds like a demon. There is no stone left unturned, as they open up to new reference points... would you believe King Crimson? New Order? The Who? The Beach Boys? Ride have reinvented themselves whilst retaining all the cuteness of Haircut One Hundred.

An academic study on My Bloody Valentine's seminal shoegazing album Loveless mentions that the tracks of Going Blank Again are "predictive" of later genres of indie rock, and notes that the seventh track "Cool Your Boots" is a "shoegazing classic". "Leave Them All Behind" ranked number 273 in NME's list of The 500 Greatest Songs of All Time, whilst the album itself ranked at number 407 in the corresponding greatest albums list published a year earlier.

Pitchfork listed the song at number 5 on its list of the best shoegaze albums of all time. Staff writer Ben Cardew said: "It’s tight, audacious, and supremely confident."

== Track listing ==
All songs written by Ride (Andy Bell, Loz Colbert, Mark Gardener, Steve Queralt).

Original album
No.	Title	Lyrics	Lead vocals	Length
1.	"Leave Them All Behind"	Gardener	Gardener and Bell	8:17
2.	"Twisterella"	Gardener	Gardener	3:42
3.	"Not Fazed"	Bell	Gardener and Bell	4:24
4.	"Chrome Waves"	Bell	Bell	3:53
5.	"Mouse Trap"	Gardener	Gardener and Bell	5:14
6.	"Time of Her Time"	Bell	Bell	3:16
7.	"Cool Your Boots"	Bell	Bell	6:01
8.	"Making Judy Smile"	Bell	Bell	2:39
9.	"Time Machine"	Gardener	Gardener and Bell	5:54
10.	"OX4"	Gardener	Gardener and Bell	7:03
Total length:				50:24

Additional tracks

Bonus tracks
No.	Title	Lead vocals	Length
11.	"Going Blank Again" (from the Twisterella EP, 1992)	Gardener and Bell	3:21
12.	"Howard Hughes" (from the Twisterella EP, 1992)	Gardener and Bell	4:03
13.	"Stampede" (from the Twisterella EP, 1992)	Gardener	4:16
14.	"Grasshopper" (from the Leave Them All Behind EP, 1992)		10:56
Total length:			73:04

DVD: Live at Brixton Academy
No.	Title	Length
1.	"Leave Them All Behind"
2.	"Taste"
3.	"Not Fazed"
4.	"Unfamiliar"
5.	"Like a Daydream"
6.	"OX4"
7.	"Perfect Time"
8.	"Twisterella"
9.	"Drive Blind"
10.	"Making Judy Smile"
11.	"Nowhere"
12.	"Vapour Trail"
13.	"Chrome Waves"
14.	"Mouse Trap"
15.	"Dreams Burn Down"
16.	"Time of Her Time"
17.	"Chelsea Girl"
Total length:		1:22:09

== Personnel ==
Personnel taken from Going Blank Again liner notes.

Ride

- Andy Bell
- Mark Gardener
- Steve Queralt
- Loz Colbert

Additional personnel

- Ride – production
- Alan Moulder – production, recording, mixing
- Matt Oliver – recording
- Christopher Gunson – cover art

Dialogue on "Cool Your Boots" taken from Withnail and I

== Charts ==
Chart (1992)	Peak position
Australian Albums (ARIA)	56
New Zealand Albums (RMNZ)	34
Swedish Albums (Sverigetopplistan)	32
UK Albums (OCC)	5

Chart (2022)	Peak position
Scottish Albums (OCC)	14
UK Independent Albums (OCC)	9

== Certifications ==
Region	Certification	Certified units/sales
United Kingdom (BPI)	Gold	100,000^{^}
^{^} Shipments figures based on certification alone.

== Release history ==
Country	Date	Label	Format	Catalogue #	Notes
United Kingdom	9 March 1992	Creation Records	LP	CRELP074	10 tracks (double vinyl)
United Kingdom	9 March 1992	Creation Records	CD	CRECD074	10 tracks
United States	March 1992	Sire Records	CD	9 26836-2	10 tracks
United Kingdom	24 September 2001	Ignition Records	CD	IGN CD10	14 tracks
United States	2011	Obscure Alternatives	LP	OAR 1108	10 tracks (150-gram double vinyl)
United Kingdom	14 February 2012	Obscure Alternatives	LP	OAR 11081	10 tracks (150-gram double vinyl)
United Kingdom	13 August 2012	Oxford Music	CD/DVD		14 tracks + 17 track live DVD
