= Play (Ride EP) =

EP by Ride
- Released: 2 April 1990
- Recorded: Blackwing, London
- Genre: Shoegaze
- Length: 14:32
- Label: Creation
- Producer: Ride

Ride chronology
Ride (1990)	Play (1990)	Smile (1990)

Professional ratings
Review scores
Source	Rating
AllMusic	4/5 stars

Play is the second EP by British rock band Ride. It was in the UK singles charts for 3 weeks in April 1990, peaking at #32.

The EP was combined with its predecessor Ride to form the Smile mini-album for the US market in July, 1990. In November, 1992, Smile was released in the UK.

In November 2022, all four songs from “Play” were made available on “4EPs”, a compilation album of Ride’s first four EPs made available together for the first time and packaged as one gatefold album on white vinyl and in CD format. It charted at number 78 on the UK Albums Chart.

== Track listing ==
All tracks are written by Ride.

12" vinyl/CD (CRE 075T/CRESCD 075)
No.	Title	Lead vocals	Length
1.	"Like a Daydream"	Mark Gardener	3:06
2.	"Silver"	Andy Bell	4:10
3.	"Furthest Sense"	Gardener	3:24
4.	"Perfect Time"	Gardener and Bell	3:52
Total length:			14:32

== Personnel ==
Ride

- Andy Bell
- Mark Gardener
- Steve Queralt
- Loz Colbert

Technical

- Ken Gardner – recording engineer
- Alan Moulder – remix on "Like a Daydream"
