= Grasshopper (EP) =

EP by Ride
- Released: 10 November 1992
- Genre: Shoegaze
- Length: 38:33
- Label: Warner Music Group

Ride chronology
Going Blank Again (1992)	Grasshopper (1992)	Carnival of Light (1994)

Grasshopper is an EP by British rock band Ride, released in November 1992.

It is compilation of two singles for the Japanese market. Tracks 1–3 are from the Leave Them All Behind single. Tracks 4–7 are from the Twisterella single.

In May 2019, Japanese game developer Goichi Suda revealed he was inspired to name his company Grasshopper Manufacture after the song.

== Track listing ==
1. "Leave Them All Behind"
2. "Chrome Waves"
3. "Grasshopper"
4. "Twisterella"
5. "Going Blank Again"
6. "Howard Hughes"
7. "Stampede"
