= Waves: Radio 1 Sessions 90–94 =

Compilation album by Ride
- Released: 7 October 2003
- Genre: Alternative rock, shoegaze
- Label: The First Time

Ride chronology
OX4 The Best of Ride (2001)	Waves: Radio 1 Sessions 90–94 (2003)	Weather Diaries (2017)

Professional ratings
Review scores
Source	Rating
Allmusic	3.5/5 stars

Waves: Radio 1 Sessions 90–94 is an album compiling tracks recorded for BBC radio sessions by British band Ride, released in 2003.

== Track listing ==
All songs written by Ride, except where noted.

1. "Like a Daydream" – 2:53
2. "Dreams Burn Down" – 6:25
3. "Perfect Time" – 3:37
4. "Sight of You" (Pale Saints cover)– 5:44
5. "All I Can See" – 3:14
6. "Decay" – 4:18
7. "Severance" (Dead Can Dance cover) – 3:30
8. "Time of Her Time" – 3:32
9. "Not Fazed" – 3:40
10. "Mousetrap" – 5:16
11. "Birdman" – 5:37
12. "Walk on Water" – 4:16
13. "Since Then" – 4:14
14. "Crown of Creation" – 4:38
15. "Let's Get Lost" – 3:49
16. "1000 Miles" – 4:56
17. "I Don't Know Where It Comes From" – 5:49
