= Loz Colbert =

English musician

- Also known as: Loz
- Born: Laurence John Colbert; 27 June 1970 (age 55); Kingston upon Thames, London, England
- Genres: Alternative rock, shoegazing, Britpop
- Instruments: Drums, percussion
- Years active: 1988–present
- Labels: Creation, Warner, Sire, The First Time, Wichita

Laurence John "Loz" Colbert (born 27 June 1970) is an English musician, best known as the drummer in Ride and formerly of The Animalhouse, The Jesus and Mary Chain, Supergrass and Gaz Coombes. His drumming style has been characterized as furious, drawing comparisons to Keith Moon.

== Early life ==
Colbert was born in Kingston upon Thames, England and grew up in the Cotswolds. As he was in a relatively isolated area, Colbert had spent a lot of time in his bedroom listening to music as well as practicing the drums as there were few distractions or neighbors to be concerned about. Growing up, some of his influences included The Jesus and Mary Chain, New Order and Echo & the Bunnymen as well as drummers like Keith Moon, Mitch Mitchell and Ginger Baker.

== Ride ==
At seventeen, Colbert attended Banbury Art School where he met Mark Gardener and Andy Bell. They used to meet at a Our Price record shop where Steve Queralt worked. The four of them formed the band, Ride, in 1988 after attending a concert by The Smiths. While still at Banbury the band produced a tape demo including the tracks "Chelsea Girl" and "Drive Blind". In February 1989 "Ride" were asked to stand in for a cancelled student union gig at Oxford Polytechnic that brought them to the attention of Alan McGee. After supporting The Soup Dragons in 1989, McGee signed them to Creation Records.

Colbert was with Ride from the beginning in 1988 to its first dissolution in 1996. During this time, he was involved in four studio albums: Nowhere, Going Blank Again, Carnival of Light and Tarantula, as well as other extended plays.

In 1996, Ride broke up due to various causes such as tensions between Bell and Gardener as well as the band having an unclear musical direction.

On 16 October 2001, all four members of Ride agreed to be filmed by Channel 4 for a one-off reunion. The footage was used for the show Pioneers, a documentary on Sonic Youth, and featured a thirty-minute improvised jam. The recording of this song, plus two short sound checks, were released in 2002 as Coming up for Air.

On 19 November 2014, it was announced that Ride had reunited again for a series of tour dates in Europe and North America, in May and June 2015. Since then, the band has released three more studio albums, Weather Diaries, This Is Not a Safe Place, and Interplay.

== The Animalhouse ==
In late 1997, Colbert and Gardener joined with Sam Williams and Hari T to form the Animalhouse. The band began making live appearances and received attention from the music press for its blend of 1960s psychedelica, Britrock, and electronica. Owing to a variety of legal and label related reasons, the band did not release any material until April 2000's Small EP. The album Ready To Receive followed in September, to commercial success in Japan, but limited success elsewhere. Shortly after the release of the album, the Animalhouse disbanded, with Gardener stating that "it just didn't work."

== The Jesus and Mary Chain ==
In 2007, Jim Reid recruited Colbert along with Phil King and Mark Crozer to be part of the reunion tour after The Jesus and Mary Chain was reformed. Colbert was with the band from 2007 to 2008. During that period, the band produced the song "All Things Must Pass" as part of the Heroes: Original Soundtrack. It was their first new material in more than a decade.

== Supergrass and Gaz Coombes ==
Colbert played for Supergrass during their 2005 tour as a brief fill in for Danny Goffey.

In addition, he has worked with Supergrass lead singer Gaz Coombes on several projects. Colbert played drums on four tracks on Coombes' Matador album, as well as performing in his touring band.

== Personal life ==
Colbert attended Oxford Brookes University, where he obtained a Bachelor of Arts and Master of Arts in Music in 2010 and 2012 respectively. Currently he is pursuing a PHD.

Colbert is a Taekwando practitioner and holds a Black Belt. He used to regularly spar with Gardener who also does Taekwondo.

In 2020, Colbert participated in a 12-hour drum session to raise over £20,000 for the NHS.

== Discography ==
=== Ride ===
==== Studio albums ====
- Nowhere (1990)
- Going Blank Again (1992)
- Carnival of Light (1994)
- Tarantula (1996)
- Weather Diaries (2017)
- This Is Not a Safe Place (2019)
- Interplay (2024)

==== Compilations, EPs, and live albums ====
- Smile (1990)
- Kaleidoscope (1991)
- Grasshopper (1992)
- Cosmic Carnival (1994)
- Live Light (1995)
- Ride (Box Set) (2001)
- OX4 The Best of Ride (2001)
- Firing Blanks Unreleased Ride Recordings 1988–95 (2001)
- Live Reading Festival 1992 (2001)
- Waves: Radio 1 Sessions 90-94 (2003)
- Tomorrow's Shore (2018)

==== Singles ====
- Vapour Trail (1991)
- Black Nite Crash (1996)

=== Gaz Coombes ===
==== Studio albums ====
- Matador (2015)
- World's Strongest Man (2018)

=== Music of Heroes ===
==== Studio albums ====
- Heroes: Original Soundtrack (2008)
