= Fall (Ride EP) =

EP by Ride
- Released: 17 September 1990
- Recorded: Blackwing Studios, London
- Genre: Shoegaze
- Length: 19:09
- Label: Creation
- Producer: Marc Waterman

Ride chronology
Smile (1990)	Fall (1990)	Nowhere (1990)

Professional ratings
Review scores
Source	Rating
AllMusic	4/5 stars

Fall is the third EP by British rock band Ride.

"Dreams Burn Down" also appeared on the vinyl issue of Ride's debut album Nowhere, released in October 1990. However, the CD version came with the remaining three tracks from the Fall EP appended.

== Track listing ==
12" vinyl/CD (CRE 087T/CRESCD 087)
No.	Title	Lyrics	Music	Lead vocals	Length
1.	"Dreams Burn Down"	Andy Bell	Bell	Mark Gardener	6:04
2.	"Taste"	Gardener	Bell, Loz Colbert, Gardener, Steve Queralt	Gardener	3:16
3.	"Here and Now"	Bell	Bell	Bell	4:26
4.	"Nowhere"	Loz Colbert	Bell, Colbert, Gardener, Queralt	Bell	5:23
Total length:					19:09
