= Tarantula (Ride album) =

Studio album by Ride
- Released: 11 March 1996
- Recorded: London, 1995
- Genre: Alternative rock, Britpop
- Length: 50:17
- Label: Creation
- Producer: Richard "Digby" Smith; Paul Motion

Ride chronology
Carnival of Light (1994)	Tarantula (1996)	OX4 The Best of Ride (2001)

Singles from Tarantula
- 1. "Black Nite Crash" Released: 12 February 1996

Professional ratings
Review scores
Source	Rating
AllMusic	1.5/5 stars
Pitchfork Media	(5.4/10)
NME	(6/10)
Melody Maker	(negative)
Select	4/5 stars
Vox	(5/10)

Tarantula is the fourth studio album by British rock band Ride, released in March 1996 shortly after the band split. The album was deleted from Creation Records' catalogue only one week after its release.

This is also the only Ride album on which Andy Bell's vocal duties outweigh those of regular frontman Mark Gardener, due to internal conflicts prior to their breakup. By contrast to the band's earlier and post-reunion albums, Gardener sang on only two songs which made the original tracklist, alongside one bonus track.

== Track listing ==
All tracks are written by Andy Bell except where noted. All lead vocals performed by Andy Bell except where noted.

Original album
No.	Title	Lyrics	Music	Lead vocals	Length
1.	"Black Nite Crash"				2:34
2.	"Sunshine/Nowhere to Run"				4:48
3.	"Dead Man"				3:34
4.	"Walk on Water"				4:20
5.	"Deep Inside My Pocket"	Mark Gardener, Jack Rieley	Gardener	Gardener	5:24
6.	"Mary Anne"				6:49
7.	"Castle on the Hill"				3:17
8.	"Gonna Be Alright"	Loz Colbert	Colbert, Bell		2:52
9.	"The Dawn Patrol"				4:04
10.	"Ride the Wind"	Colbert	Colbert, Gardener, Steve Queralt	Gardener	3:45
11.	"Burnin'"				5:17
12.	"Starlight Motel"				3:33

Bonus tracks
No.	Title	Lyrics	Music	Lead vocals	Length
13.	"Nothing Lasts Forever"				3:31
14.	"Slave"	Gardener	Gardener	Gardener	3:50
15.	"A Trip Down Ronnie Lane"				3:37

== Personnel ==
Ride

- Laurence Colbert – drums
- Steve Queralt – bass
- Mark Gardener – vocals, rhythm guitar
- Andy Bell – vocals, lead guitar

Additional musicians

- Nick Moorbath – piano, Hammond organ, Fender Rhodes
- Jeff Scantlebury – percussion

Technical personnel

- Richard "Digby" Smith – engineering
- Paul Motion – engineering
- Mark Freegard – mixing (except "Castle On The Hill" and "Deep Inside My Pocket")
- Andy Bell – mixing ("Castle On The Hill")
- Mitch Easter – mixing ("Deep Inside My Pocket")

== Charts ==
Chart (1996)	Peak position
Scottish Albums (OCC)	26
UK Albums (OCC)	21

Chart (2023)	Peak position
Scottish Albums (OCC)	31
UK Independent Albums (OCC)	9
