= Today Forever =

1991 extended play by Ride

EP by Ride
- Released: 4 March 1991
- Studio: Black Barn, Ripley
- Genre: Shoegaze
- Length: 19:56
- Label: Creation
- Producer: Matt Oliver

Ride chronology
Nowhere (1990)	Today Forever (1991)	Going Blank Again (1992)

Professional ratings
Review scores
Source	Rating
AllMusic	4/5 stars

Today Forever is an EP by British rock band Ride, released in March 1991. The EP debuted at No.14 and No.1 on the Indie Chart in the UK.

The first three songs also appeared in the US on the "Vapour Trail" CD-single. All four songs from the EP were added to the Nowhere album as bonus tracks on its re-release in 2001, 20th anniversary reissue in 2011, and 25th anniversary reissue in 2015.

In November 2022, all four songs were made available on ‘4EPs’, a compilation of Ride’s first four EPs made available together for the first time and packaged as one gatefold album on white vinyl and in CD format.

== Track listing ==
All tracks are written by Ride.

12" vinyl/CD/Cassette (CRE 100T/CRESCD 100/CRECS 100)
No.	Title	Lead vocals	Length
1.	"Unfamiliar"	Gardener and Bell	5:03
2.	"Sennen"	Gardener and Bell	4:23
3.	"Beneath"	Gardener and Bell	4:07
4.	"Today"	Gardener and Bell	6:26

== Video album ==
Today Forever

Video by Ride
- Released: March 18, 1991
- Recorded: 1989–1991
- Genre: Shoegazing
- Length: 20 minutes (UK version); 35 minutes (Japan version)
- Language: English
- Label: MCEG Vigin (UK version); Warner Music Vision (Japan version)
- Director: James Deegan, Angus Cameron, Kevin Kerslake
- Producer: Angus Cameron, Max Abyss, Silvey & Company

Ride chronology
Today Forever (1991)	Live at Brixton Academy (1992)

In 1991, a video album was released to accompany the EP, featuring a music video for each song directed by James Deegan. The release was also made available in Japan on Laserdisc as part of a box set with the band's Brixton live video. This version was a compilation of all of the band's music videos up to that point.

== Track listing ==
UK version
No.	Title	Length
1.	"Unfamiliar"	4:56
2.	"Sennen"	4:17
3.	"Beneath"	4:07
4.	"Today"	6:26

Japan version
No.	Title	Director	Length
1.	"Chelsea Girl"	Angus Cameron	2:30
2.	"Like a Daydream"	Cameron	3:27
3.	"Taste"	Cameron	3:24
4.	"Unfamiliar"	James Deegan	4:56
5.	"Sennen"	Deegan	4:17
6.	"Beneath"	Deegan	4:06
7.	"Today"	Deegan	6:26
8.	"Vapour Trail"	Kevin Kerslake	4:17
