= Ride (band) =

English rock band

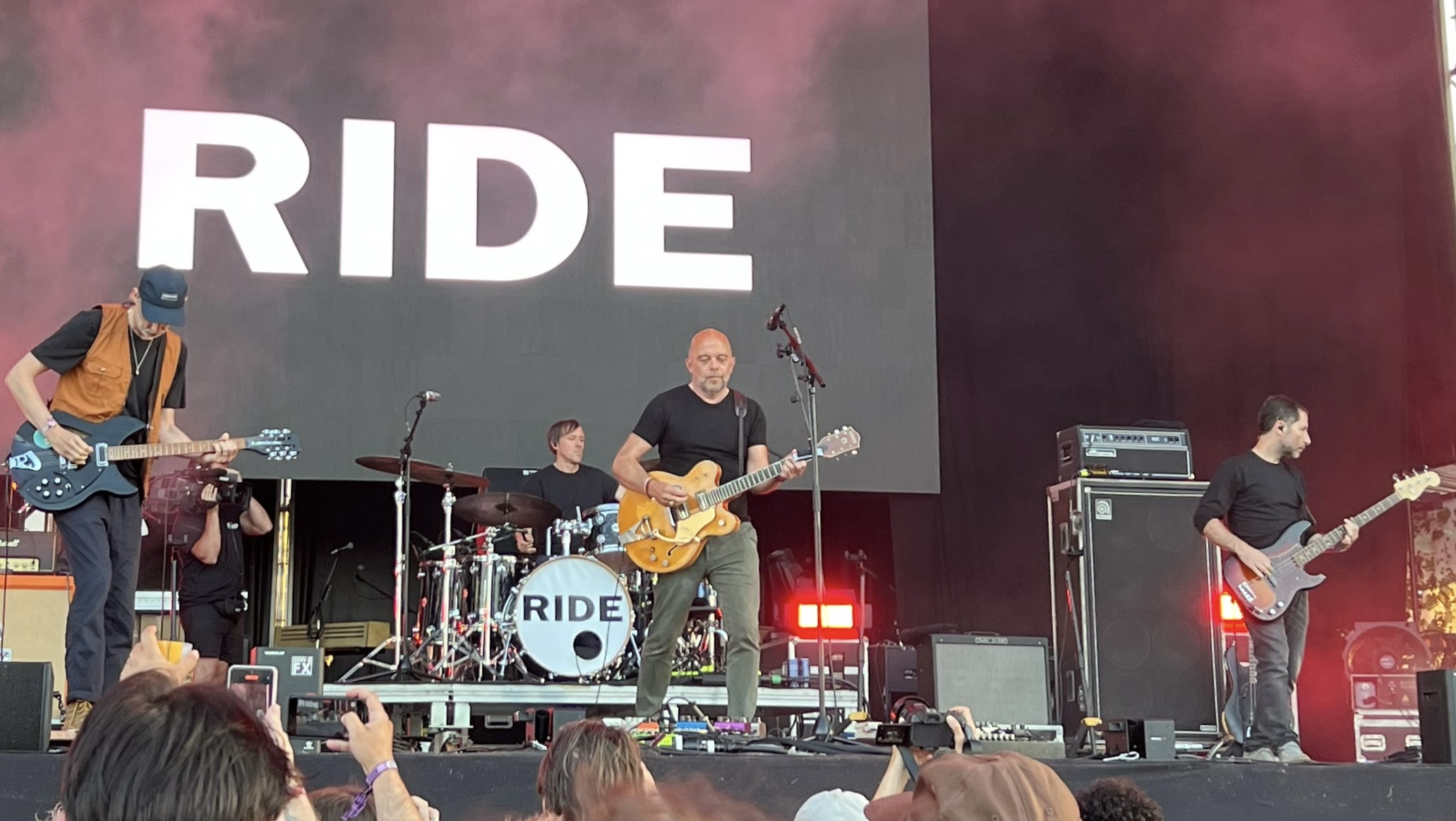
- Ride performing in Barcelona in 2022, from left to right: Bell, Colbert, Gardener, Queralt

Background information
- Origin: Oxford, England
- Genres: Shoegaze; alternative rock; noise pop; dream pop; neo-psychedelia; Britpop
- Years active: 1988–1996 • 2001 • 2014–present
- Labels: Creation; Warner; Sire; The First Time; Wichita
- Members: Andy Bell; Loz Colbert; Mark Gardener; Steve Queralt
- Website: www.thebandride.com

Ride are an English rock band formed in Oxford in 1988. The band consists of vocalists and guitarists Andy Bell and Mark Gardener, drummer Laurence "Loz" Colbert and bassist Steve Queralt. They have been recognised as one of the key pioneers of shoegaze, an alternative rock subgenre that emerged to prominence in the United Kingdom during the early 1990s.

The band's first two albums, Nowhere (1990) and Going Blank Again (1992), have been critically acclaimed as two of the greatest shoegaze albums of all time. The latter's lead single, "Leave Them All Behind", was the band's most commercially successful song, reaching No. 9 on the UK Singles Chart. Both Going Blank Again and its 1994 follow-up, Carnival of Light, peaked at No. 5 on the UK Albums Chart.

Ride broke up in 1996 prior to the release of their fourth album Tarantula, which received negative reviews. Bell joined Oasis in 1999 as their bassist. The band reunited in 2014 to tour again, and also put out the albums Weather Diaries (2017), This Is Not a Safe Place (2019) and Interplay (2024).

== History ==
=== 1988–1989: Starting out ===
Andy Bell and Mark Gardener had been to Cheney School in Oxford, appearing in the school's musical theatre productions, and in October 1988, they moved to Banbury to do Foundation Studies in Art & Design at North Oxfordshire College and the Oxfordshire School of Art & Design. There they met Laurence Colbert and Steve Queralt. Queralt, who also went to Cheney School, was recruited from the local Our Price record shop where he worked as a singles buyer (although Bell and Queralt had already played together in an obscure reggae/pop band called "Big Spiderback"). After considering various names, the band settled for 'Ride', with its evocation of travel, and after the ride cymbal. Bell has cited a performance by the Smiths as the inspiration for forming a band. The band formed in the summer of 1988 and played their first gig as Ride for the College's Christmas Party towards the end of the year. While still at Banbury, the band produced a demo tape, recorded in Queralt's bedroom and hallway, including the tracks "Chelsea Girl" and "Drive Blind". Queralt and his record shop boss and future Ride manager Dave Newton had started a live music night in Oxford called Local Support, and it was due to a cancellation by another band that Ride got their first proper gig at one of these nights. Jim Reid of the Jesus and Mary Chain heard a copy of the demo that was in the possession of the DJ Gary Crowley, and this led to interest from former Mary Chain manager Alan McGee. After the band supported the Soup Dragons in 1989, McGee signed them to his Creation Records label.

=== 1989–1993: Early Creation years ===
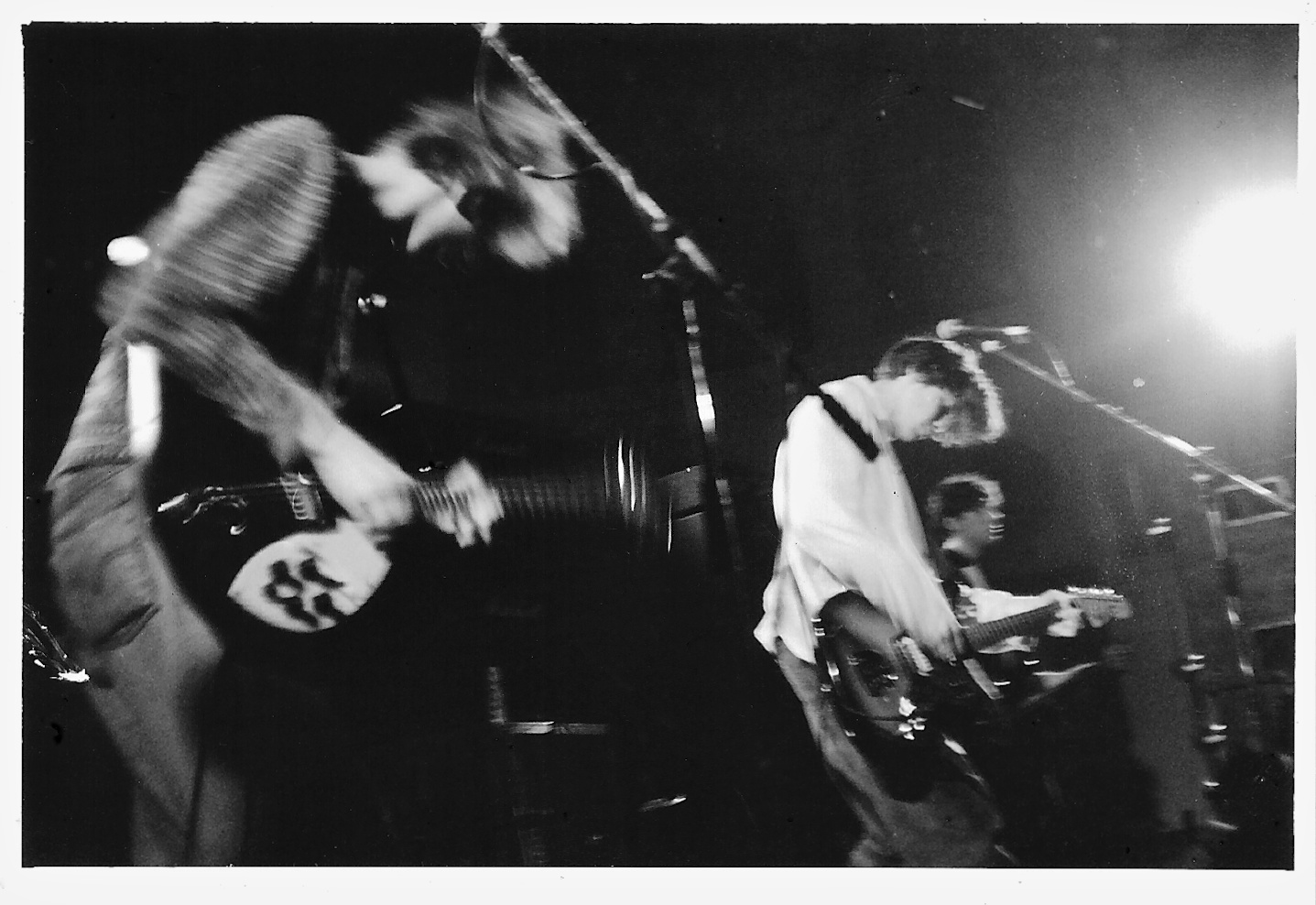
Ride performing in 1990

Ride released three EPs between January and September 1990, entitled Ride, Play and Fall. All three EPs made it into the UK top 75, with Play and Fall reaching the top 40. Ride's top-75 placing was a first for Creation Records. The first two EPs were released together as Smile in the USA in July 1990 (and later released in the UK in 1992), while the Fall EP was incorporated into the CD version of their first album, Nowhere, released in October 1990. Bell said that the band kept putting out new material to remain fresh in listeners' minds, comparing it to the release schedules of the Beatles and the Jam.

The band were often labelled as part of the "shoegaze" scene, but the band rejected this, Bell stating "my first reaction was like, this is another boring tag. These days...that's pretty much still my reaction". Gardener said of the band's influences "We liked the noisy bands of the time. When we were at art college we went to see My Bloody Valentine, House of Love, Stone Roses and Sonic Youth. I think these all had a lot of influence on us in the early days as they were great gigs". Spacemen 3, Loop, Dinosaur Jr., the Fall, Pixies, the Beatles, the Rolling Stones, the Velvet Underground, the Stooges, Ultra Vivid Scene, and the Byrds also proved influential.

The band recorded two sessions for John Peel's BBC Radio 1 show in 1990, and their popularity with the show's listeners saw them with three tracks in the Festive Fifty that year, with "Dreams Burn Down" and "Like a Daydream" at numbers 3 and 4 respectively, and "Taste" at number 25.

Nowhere was a critical and commercial success, reaching number 11 in the UK Albums Chart. Demand for new material was high, and the band recorded another EP, Today Forever, released in March 1991. The EP marked a change in direction for the group away from the noisier early style. Ride made their first international tour to Japan, Australia and France later on that year. Tickets for the performances in Japan sold out within minutes.

In February 1992, the band broke into the top 10 of the UK Singles Chart with "Leave Them All Behind", which peaked at number 9, and the following month saw the release of the band's second album Going Blank Again, which peaked at number 5 in the UK Albums Chart. However, second single "Twisterella" was a commercial disappointment, peaking at number 36 in the UK Singles Chart despite extremely high expectations, and Creation ceased its promotion campaign for the album as a result of this. The band subsequently embarked on an ill-fated American tour, and the strain within the band was already apparent, Bell stating "By the time the second album came out we were touring too much. We were tired. We then took time off, but it was too much time off".

=== 1994–1996: Change in musical direction ===
Ride were able to see out 1993 riding on the success of Going Blank Again and a third album was keenly anticipated. A double weekend of gigs with The Charlatans that year ('Daytripper') kept them in the public eye amid a wider lack of interest in the shoegazing scene. Their third album, Carnival of Light, was released in June 1994, at a time when Britpop was the focus of the music press. Produced by John Leckie and partly engineered by Nigel Godrich (future Radiohead producer) – except "How Does it Feel to Feel?" by Black Crowes producer George Drakoulias – and featuring a guest appearance on keyboards from Jon Lord of Deep Purple, the album was split between songwriters Gardener and Bell, with the former's songs making up the first half of the album and the latter's the second. Not only did the album's sound eschew the band's earlier influences in favour of inspiration from classic rock, but the band's approach to songwriting also changed: whereas earlier material had mostly been developed by the band in jam sessions as a group, for Carnival of Light Bell and Gardener would arrive in the studio with their songs more or less fully formed. Opening with the riff-heavy "Moonlight Medicine", tracks also include "From Time to Time", "Birdman" and a cover of The Creation's "How Does It Feel to Feel?", which was released as a single. The album was not well received by critics, Bell explaining "These were good times but the music took second place. When we recorded the Carnival of Light album we got indulgent". By the end of 1994, even the band themselves were critical of the album, referring to it within the group as "Carnival of Shite".

=== 1996: The break-up ===
1995 saw the dissolution of the band while recording Tarantula. Gardener and Bell had led the band away from their shoegazing roots to become more contemporary, hoping to change their style with the times. Queralt has remarked that the band had two future directions open to them, and they chose the wrong option. Gardener had become interested in dance music, and wanted Ride to incorporate that into their style, while Bell disagreed. The track listing of Carnival of Light gives an indication of the tension that was mounting between the two guitarists, with the first half of the album being songs written by Mark Gardener and the last half by Bell, who refused to let his songs be interspersed with Gardener's.

By the time Tarantula appeared, the band was beginning to self-destruct. Bell penned most of the songs while Gardener provided only one - the tension within the band leading to an inability to write meaningful musical pieces. Castle on the Hill, written by Bell, was a lament for the band's situation and contains references to Gardener's self-imposed exile from the group. Gardener walked out during the album's mixing sessions, and the band announced their break-up shortly before its release in March 1996. The album was released and remained on sale for one week before being withdrawn. Critics and fans alike had panned the album (although the first single off the album, "Black Nite Crash", was awarded "single of the week" by weekly music magazine Melody Maker). The album was described by AllMusic as "an abomination of '70s/Lenny Kravitz clichés, full of third- and fourth-rate tunes and, ultimately, bad blood", going on to say "the words are just plain awful throughout, not even worth printing". Rolling Stone were more complimentary, stating "the album is saved from maudlin self-obsession because it's rawer and rocks harder than anything else Ride have recorded".

Since the break-up, both Bell and Gardener have been more reflective about the group's disintegration, with Bell especially admitting his own part in the process.

=== 1997–2001: Post-break-up years ===
After the split, Andy Bell formed a new band called Hurricane No. 1 but this project was permanently dissolved when he was asked to play bass for Oasis after having turned down the opportunity to join Gay Dad. He lived in Stockholm during this period. Mark Gardener and Laurence Colbert joined with Sam Williams to form the Animalhouse. As BMG signings, they were successful in Japan. The band was, however, short lived and split in 2002.

=== 2001–2013: Channel Four and beyond ===
On 16 October 2001, all four members of Ride agreed to be filmed by Channel 4. The footage was used for the show Pioneers, a documentary on Sonic Youth, and featured a thirty-minute improvised jam. The recording of this song, plus two short sound checks, were released in 2002 as Coming up for Air. The interest in this limited release CD caused the band to consider future releases. In late 2002, Ride released a 3-CD box set which is made up of OX4_ The Best of Ride, Firing Blanks (Unreleased tracks) and Live_Reading Festival 1992. In 2003, they released Waves, a collection of tracks from five radio sessions recorded for the BBC.

Mark Gardener then pursued a solo career. From 2003 to 2005, Gardener toured extensively, sometimes with the help of Oxford friends Goldrush, in order to personally fund a full-length studio album. During the tour, a three-track EP with Goldrush (Falling Out into the Night) and a live album (the acoustic solo Live @ the Knitting Factory, New York City) were released. He also spent part of 2005 working with the French duo rinôçérôse. In late 2005, Gardener's album These Beautiful Ghosts was released in North America on United For Opportunity.

Any thoughts of permanently re-forming the band, however, were previously explicitly denied by Bell, with the reasoning that it would not live up to expectations. However, band members, Bell included, had stated that they would not mind working with each other again. Since then, Bell and Colbert have made an appearance at one of Gardener's early shows; Bell later shared two nights of acoustic sets with Gardener in November 2003 when Gardener made a tour stop in Bell's then home of Stockholm.

=== 2014–present: Reunion albums ===
On 19 November 2014, it was announced that Ride had reunited again for a series of tour dates in Europe and North America, in May and June 2015. On 10 and 17 April 2015, Ride performed at Coachella, following a live performance broadcast by KCRW on 8 April 2015. The band played many European festivals such as Primavera Sound, Best Kept Secret, Melt! Festival, Field Day, Pukkelpop and Øyafestivalen. They also toured America with DIIV opening. The reunion was originally meant for touring only, but after playing shows together again, the band decided that the experience should also lead to the recording of a new album.

On 21 February 2017, the band premiered "Charm Assault", their first new song in 21 years. The next day, the band released another single, "Home Is a Feeling". On 23 March, Ride announced their first new studio album in 21 years, Weather Diaries. The album was released on 16 June 2017. It made number 11 in the UK album charts and gained critical and fan approval upon its release, supported by a tour of Europe and North America across the summer and autumn of 2017. On 27 May 2018, they played a hometown gig, as first support to James, in Oxford's South Parks, as part of the two-day "Common People" festival (the previous day had been in Southampton).

In March 2019, the band announced that their upcoming sixth studio album had already been finished, with the same producer as their previous album, Erol Alkan. The new album, called This Is Not a Safe Place, was released on 16 August 2019.

Ride played the 2022 edition of the Primavera Sound festival, performing Going Blank Again and Nowhere in full on two separate days. The band also toured for the 30th anniversary of Nowhere from 2022 to 2024, including a co-headlining "Between Nowhere" tour with The Charlatans (who played Between 10th and 11th in full) in North America.

In November 2022, Ride announced that the band had been working on a seventh album, set for release in 2023 or 2024. On 11 January 2024, Ride announced their seventh album, Interplay, with the release of the lead single "Peace Sign". The album was released on 29 March 2024.

== Members ==
- Mark Gardener – vocals, rhythm guitar
- Andy Bell – vocals, lead guitar, keyboards
- Steve Queralt – bass
- Laurence "Loz" Colbert – drums

== Discography ==
=== Studio albums ===
List of studio albums, with selected details
Release date	Album	Label	Chart positions		Certifications
Release date	Album	Label	UK	AUS	Certifications
15 October 1990	Nowhere	Creation	11	104	BPI: Silver
9 March 1992	Going Blank Again	Creation	5	56	BPI: Gold
20 June 1994	Carnival of Light	Creation	5	32	
20 March 1996	Tarantula	Creation	21	—	
16 June 2017	Weather Diaries	Wichita	11	—	
16 August 2019	This Is Not a Safe Place	Wichita	7	78	
29 March 2024	Interplay	Wichita	8	—	
"—" denotes releases that did not chart.

=== EPs ===
List of EPs, with selected details
Release date	Title	Label	Chart positions
Release date	Title	Label	UK
15 January 1990	Ride	Creation	71
2 April 1990	Play	Creation	32
17 September 1990	Fall	Creation	34
4 March 1991	Today Forever	Creation	14
1994	Live		—
2002	Coming Up for Air		—
16 February 2018	Tomorrow's Shore	Wichita	—

=== Compilations and live albums ===
- Smile (1990) Sire/Creation
- Kaleidoscope (1991) Sire (promotional only)
- Grasshopper (1992) Sire/Warner Bros.
- Cosmic Carnival (1994) Sire
- Live Light (1995) Mutiny/Elektra
- Ride (Box Set) (2001) Ignition
- OX4 The Best of Ride (2001) Ignition
- Firing Blanks Unreleased Ride Recordings 1988–95 (2001)
- Live Reading Festival 1992 (2001)
- Waves: Radio 1 Sessions 90-94 (2003)
- 4EPs (Wichita, 2022)

=== Singles ===
List of singles, with selected peak chart positions
Year	Title	Chart positions			Album
Year	Title	UK	AUS	US Alt.	Album
1991	"Taste"	—	—	24	Nowhere
1991	"Vapour Trail"	—	—	—	Nowhere
1992	"Leave Them All Behind"	9	89	20	Going Blank Again
1992	"Twisterella"	36	105	12	Going Blank Again
1994	"Birdman"	38	—	—	Carnival of Light
1994	"How Does It Feel to Feel?"	58	—	—	Carnival of Light
1994	"I Don't Know Where It Comes From"	46	—	—	Carnival of Light
1996	"Black Nite Crash"	67	—	—	Tarantula
2017	"Charm Assault"	—	—	—	Weather Diaries
2017	"Home Is a Feeling"	—	—	—	Weather Diaries
2017	"All I Want"	—	—	—	Weather Diaries
2017	"Cali"	—	—	—	Weather Diaries
2019	"Future Love"	—	—	—	This Is Not a Safe Place
2019	"Repetition"	—	—	—	This Is Not a Safe Place
2019	"Clouds of Saint Marie"	—	—	—	This Is Not a Safe Place
2024	"Peace Sign"	—	—	—	Interplay
"—" denotes releases that did not chart or were not released in that territory.

=== Videography ===
- Ride: Today Forever (1991)
- Ride: Live at Brixton Academy (1992)
