= Ride (EP) =

EP by Ride
- Released: 15 January 1990
- Recorded: Union, Oxford
- Genre: Shoegaze
- Length: 16:34
- Label: Creation
- Producer: Ride

Ride chronology
Demo (1989)	Ride (1990)	Play (1990)

Professional ratings
Review scores
Source	Rating
AllMusic	4/5 stars

Ride is the first EP by British rock band Ride and their debut, released in January 1990. It was in the UK singles charts for four weeks and was the first Creation Records label release to enter U.K. Top 75.

“Ride” EP was combined with its follow-up Play to form the Smile mini-album for the US market in July, 1990. Two years later, in November, 1992, Smile was released in the UK, too, after both EPs had gone out of print.

In November 2022, all four songs from “Ride” EP were made available on ‘‘4EPs’’, a compilation of Ride's first four EPs made available together for the first time and packaged as one gatefold album on white vinyl and in CD format. It charted at number 78 on the UK Albums Chart.

== Track listing ==
All tracks are written by Ride.

12" vinyl/CD (CRE 072T/CRESCD 072)
No.	Title	Lead vocals	Length
1.	"Chelsea Girl"	Mark Gardener with Andy Bell	2:58
2.	"Drive Blind"	Gardener	4:45
3.	"All I Can See"	Gardener and Bell	3:24
4.	"Close My Eyes"	Gardener	5:27
Total length:			16:34
