= Mark Gardener =

English musician

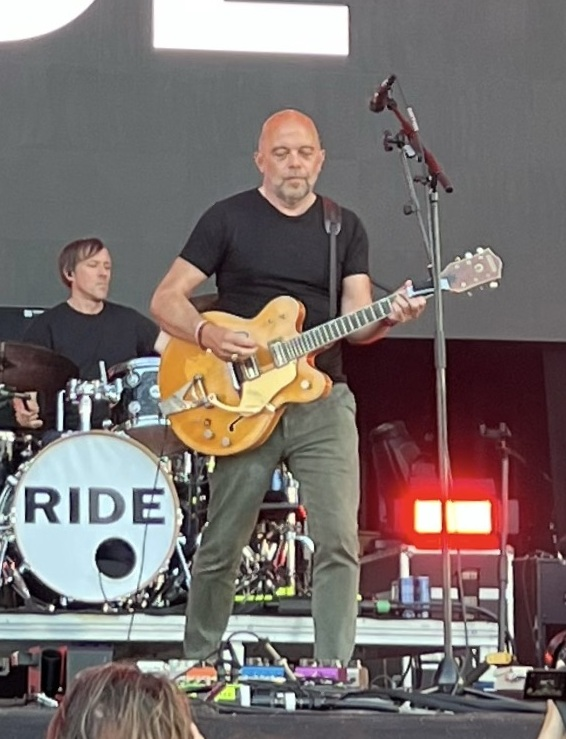
- Gardener with Ride at Primavera Sound 2022

Background information
- Born: Mark Stephen Gardener; 6 December 1969 (age 56)
- Origin: Oxford, England
- Genres: Alternative rock, shoegazing, Britpop
- Occupations: Singer, musician, songwriter
- Instruments: Vocals, guitar
- Years active: 1988–present
- Member of: Ride
- Website: markgardener.com

Mark Stephen Gardener (born 6 December 1969) is an English rock musician, best known for being one of two singer-guitarists for the shoegaze band Ride.

== Career ==
=== Ride ===
Gardener formed Ride with Andy Bell (guitarist), whom he met at Cheney School in Oxford, and Laurence Colbert (drummer) and Steve Queralt (bass guitarist), whom he met doing Foundation Studies in Art and Design at Banbury in 1988. While still at Banbury the band produced a tape demo including the tracks "Chelsea Girl" and "Drive Blind". In February 1989, "Ride" were asked to stand in for a cancelled student union gig at Oxford Polytechnic that brought them to the attention of Alan McGee. After Ride had supported the Soup Dragons in 1989, McGee signed them to Creation Records.

With Ride, Gardener released three EPs between January and September 1990, entitled Ride, Play and Fall. While the EPs had only limited chart success, enough critical praise was received to make Ride the "darlings" of the UK music press. The first two EPs were eventually released together as Smile in the USA in July 1990 (and later released in the UK in 1992), while the Fall EP was incorporated into the CD version of their debut album, Nowhere, released in October 1990. Nowhere was hailed as a critical success and the media dubbed Ride "The brightest hope" for 1991. This was followed in March 1992 by the band's second album Going Blank Again.

Despite having a solid fanbase and some mainstream success, the lack of a breakthrough contributed to inter-band tension, especially between Gardener and Bell. Their third album, Carnival of Light, was released in 1994, after shoegazing had given way to Britpop. Carnival of Light was oriented towards this new sound, but sales were sluggish and the shift in musical tastes devastated much of their original audience and critics alike.

1995 saw the dissolution of the band while recording their fourth album, Tarantula, due to creative and personal tensions between Gardener and Bell. The track listing of Carnival of Light gives some indication of the tension that was mounting between the two guitarists, with the first half of the album being songs written by Gardener and the last half of the album being songs written by Bell – one or both had refused to let their songs be interspersed with pieces written by the other. Bell penned most of the songs for Tarantula, one of which – "Castle on the Hill" – was a lament for the band's situation and contains references to Gardener's self-imposed exile from the group. Gardener contributed only the song "Deep Inside My Pocket", a bitter illustration of Gardener's view of Bell at the time. The album was deleted from sales one week after release, but was re-released in 2001 along with the other Ride albums. Critics were almost universally negative regarding the album and almost seemed to view the split with relief.

Ride reformed in 2014 and have since released several albums of new material.

=== The Animalhouse ===
After leaving Ride, Gardener released the limited-edition single "Magdalen Sky" on the Shifty Disco label in June 1997. This was part of the label's Single of the Month club, and was limited to 1000 copies only. It featured a rare B-side "Can't Let it Die (Home Demo in the Attic)". "Magdalen Sky" was featured on the year-end single compilation It's a Shifty Disco Thing Vol. 1. Later that same year, Supergrass producer Sam Williams played his song "Blah Na Na", which had itself also been a Shifty Disco Single of the Month, at one of Gardener's solo concerts, an event that would lead to the founding of the Animalhouse.

In late 1997, Gardener and Williams joined with former Ride drummer Loz Colbert and bassist Hari T to form the Animalhouse. The band began making live appearances and received attention from the music press for its blend of 1960s psychedelica, Britrock, and electronica. Owing to a variety of legal and label related reasons, the band did not release any material until April 2000's Small EP. The album Ready To Receive followed in September, to commercial success in Japan, but limited success elsewhere. Shortly after the release of the album, the Animalhouse disbanded, with Gardener stating that "it just didn't work."

=== Solo and other work ===
After the demise of the Animalhouse, Gardener moved to France and retreated from the music business. But it was not to last; while visiting his sister he began playing an acoustic guitar, re-learning old songs and writing new ones. Meanwhile, interest in Ride increased upon the release of a greatest hits record which Gardener and his former bandmates participated in selecting the songs for. This was followed by a box set, remastered re-issues of all of Ride's albums and a one-off "reunion" recorded for a Sonic Youth tribute television show. This reunion resulted in the 2002 release of a limited edition instrumental EP entitled Coming Up For Air. Gardener began playing solo shows in 2002, both in the United States and in the UK, supporting the Ride releases as well as his own newly written material.

Gardener toured extensively in the two years preceding the release of his first solo studio album, including many stops in New York City. The tours ranged from shows featuring Gardener and a 12-string acoustic guitar to a full-backing band featuring members of Goldrush. An early EP was released in late 2003 as a Mark Gardener/Goldrush collaboration called Falling Out into the Night, which featured a Gardener song ("Snow in Mexico") backed by Goldrush, a Goldrush song ("Out of Reach"), and a Ride cover ("Dreams Burn Down") featuring the two together. An acoustic solo show in April 2003 at The Knitting Factory in New York City was released on CD entitled Live at the Knitting Factory, NYC. This release was a limited edition and was intended to help finance the recording of Gardener's first studio album.

Finally, Gardener completed his debut solo album in 2005, titled These Beautiful Ghosts, a collaboration with fellow Oxford musicians Goldrush. In addition to Goldrush, other performers on the album include: Grasshopper and Suzanne Thorpe from Mercury Rev, Gene Park, Cat Martino, Kaye Phillips, Clive Poole, and Sacha from the Morning After Girls. A limited-edition version of These Beautiful Ghosts, featuring a bonus DVD with tour footage and other materials, was made available to anyone who pre-ordered the album. Due to unforeseen issues, this DVD was delayed for over three years, finally being finished and sent out to those who had pre-ordered the album in January 2009. The album was produced and mixed by Bill Racine and Gardener. It was initially released in North America on US indie label United For Opportunity, and in 2006 was also made available in Belgium, the Netherlands, and Japan. Further European, Australian, and South-East Asia releases of the album were scheduled in late 2006. A single for the album, "The Story of the Eye", featuring a remix by Ulrich Schnauss, was released on 7-inch in November 2006 by Sonic Cathedral.

The tours and collaborative EP were what led to Goldrush's extensive participation on These Beautiful Ghosts. Sometime after the release of the album, Gardener and Goldrush had a falling-out, and Goldrush no longer accompanies Gardener to shows. He has continued touring, playing solo and with different performers, most notably Cat Martino, who appeared on the album, and since late 2006, a new backing band.

Gardener has also worked with a variety of artists, performing live, recording instruments and/or vocals, and producing during his post-Ride career. He has collaborated with neo-psychedelic rock band the Brian Jonestown Massacre's 13th studio album, My Bloody Underground, co-writing the song "Monkey Powder" with Anton Newcombe, and contributing to and appearing on other songs on the album. Gardener and Newcombe recorded the BJM album predominately in Iceland.

Gardener has also worked with alternative rock band the Morning After Girls (from Melbourne). He contributes vocals on the song "Fall Before Walking", on the group's debut album, Shadows Evolve.

Gardener has also worked with alternative rock French band Molly's (from Amiens). He produced and realised the first album of the band "Sighs of the Night" which was recorded in his own studio OX-4 Sound based in Oxford. On the album which was released on 24 January 2011, he contributes vocals on the track "Tastes Like Sedative", and joined Molly's on stage in Amiens to perform Ride's song "Leave Them All Behind".

During touring for the album, Gardener has appeared on stage with both Andy Bell and Loz Colbert.

Gardener currently has his own recording studio in Oxford where he produces and mixes for many bands including Swervedriver, Brian Jonestown Massacre, Robin Guthrie, Dead Horse One among others. He also provided the soundtrack for award-winning film Upside Down – The Creation Records Story, picking up a MOJO Vision Award for his work in 2011.

== Discography ==
=== Albums ===
- Live at the Knitting Factory, NYC (2004)
- These Beautiful Ghosts (2005)
- Universal Road (with Robin Guthrie) (2015)

=== Singles/EPs ===
- "Magdalen Sky" (1997)
- Falling Out into the Night EP (2003)
- The Story of the Eye (2006)

=== Compilation appearances ===
- It's a Shifty Disco Thing Vol. 1 (1997) – "Magdalen Sky"
- 0–60 in Five Years (2002) – "Magdalen Sky"
- Flirt (2003) – "See What You Get" (acoustic)
- Sunsets and Silhouettes (2004) – "Snow in Mexico"

=== Guest spots and collaborations ===
- Man with No Name – The First Day single (1998) – vocals/co-writer
- Meister – Above the Clouds (Single) ~ BECK O.S.T (2004) – vocals
- Jam & Spoon – Mary Jane (2004) – vocals
- The Morning After Girls – Morning After Girls (2005) – vocals
- The Morning After Girls – Shadows Evolve (2005) – vocals
- Rinocerose – Schizophrenia (2005) – vocals
- Rinocerose – Rinocerose (2006) – vocals/co-writer
- The Tamborines – Sally O'Gannon (2006) – backing vocals
- Brian Jonestown Massacre – Monkey Powder (2008) – vocals/co-writer
- Molly's – Tastes Like Sedative (2011) – vocals
- A Shoreline Dream – Whitelined (2024) – vocals/co-writer
- RAY – Bittersweet (2025) – lyrics, composition
