= Andy Bell (Welsh musician) =

Welsh-born musician (born 1970)

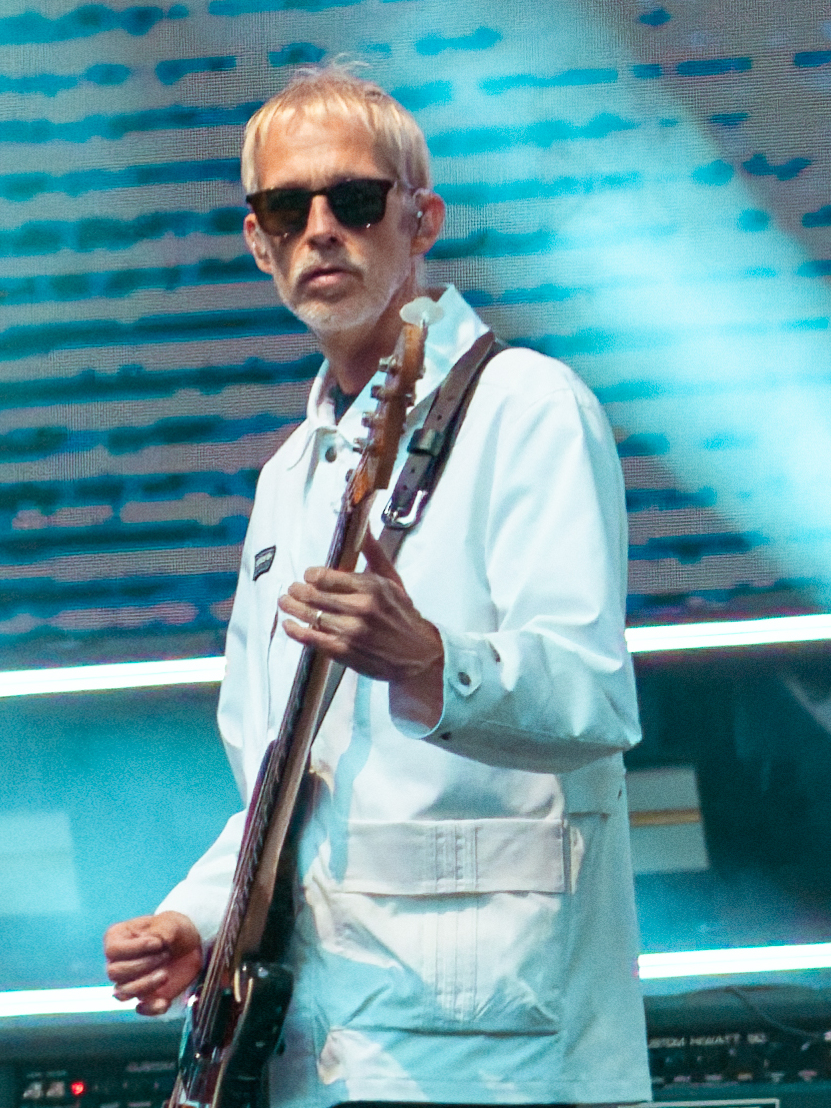
- Bell performing with Oasis in August 2025
- Born: Andrew Piran Bell; 11 August 1970 (age 56); Cardiff, Wales
- Occupations: Singer; musician; songwriter; record producer
- Spouse(s): Idha (formerly) Shiarra (m. 2010)
- Children: 4
- Musical career
- Also known as: GLOK
- Genres: Alternative rock; shoegaze; Britpop
- Instruments: Guitar; vocals; bass; keyboards
- Years active: 1988–present
- Labels: Creation; Big Brother
- Member of: Ride; Oasis; Mantra of the Cosmos
- Formerly of: Hurricane #1; Beady Eye

Andrew Piran Bell (born 11 August 1970) is a British musician and songwriter. He is known as the bass guitarist of Oasis and vocalist and guitarist of the shoegaze band Ride. Bell has also been a member of Hurricane #1 and Beady Eye, an offshoot of Oasis which released two studio albums between 2009 and 2014. With Ride, Bell helped pioneer shoegaze, an alternative rock subgenre which reached its peak popularity in the early 1990s.

Bell first joined Oasis in November 1999, following the departure of founding bass guitarist Paul "Guigsy" McGuigan, and was a member of the band for ten years until the band's break-up in 2009. Bell contributed to the band's final three albums – Heathen Chemistry (2002), Don't Believe the Truth (2005) and Dig Out Your Soul (2008) – often contributing to the songwriting process and receiving sole songwriting credits on several songs. When the band reunited in 2024 after 15 years of inactivity, Bell rejoined Oasis and embarked on the concurrently-announced Oasis Live '25 Tour with them the following year. Bell was inducted into the Rock and Roll Hall of Fame as a member of Oasis in 2026.

Bell has released five solo albums: The View from Halfway Down (2020), Pattern Recognition (2021), Flicker (2022), Tidal Love Numbers (2023) and Pinball Wanderer (2025). As of 2023, Bell has also been a member of the supergroup Mantra of the Cosmos, alongside Shaun Ryder, Zak Starkey and Bez.

== Career ==
=== Ride ===
Bell formed Ride with Mark Gardener (guitarist), whom he met at Cheney School in Oxford and Laurence Colbert (drummer) and Steve Queralt (bassist), whom he met doing Foundation Studies in Art and Design at Banbury in 1988. While still at Banbury the band produced a tape demo including the tracks "Chelsea Girl" and "Drive Blind". In February 1989, Ride were asked to stand in for a cancelled student union gig at Oxford Polytechnic that brought them to the attention of Alan McGee. After supporting The Soup Dragons in 1989 McGee then signed them to Creation Records which is a key event in Bell's life.

With Ride, Bell released three EPs between January and September 1990, entitled Ride, Play and Fall. While the EPs achieved a degree of chart success per release, enough critical praise was received to make Ride the darlings of music journalists. The first two EPs were eventually released together as Smile in 1992, while the Fall EP was later incorporated into CD releases of their debut LP, Nowhere, released in October 1990, which was hailed as a critical success, with the media dubbing Ride "the brightest hope" for 1991. On Nowhere, Bell contributed "Seagull", "Kaleidoscope", "In a Different Place", Polar Bear", "Dreams Burn Down", "Paralysed", and "Vapour Trail".

There was a rumour in early 1991 that Robert Smith (The Cure) refused to appear in the Great British Music Weekend concert unless Ride were also in the list of acts playing. Ride did appear along with The Wedding Present, Carter USM and The Cure. Nowhere was followed in March 1992 with Going Blank Again. The twin rhythm guitars of Bell and Gardener, both distorted, both using wah-wah pedals and both feeding back on each other was seen as the highlight of the album's critical and chart success. On Going Blank Again, Bell contributed "Not Fazed", "Chrome Waves", "Time Of Her Time", "Cool Your Boots" and "Making Judy Smile".

Despite having a solid fanbase and some mainstream success, the lack of a breakthrough contributed to intra-band tension, especially between Gardener and Bell. Their third LP, Carnival of Light, was released in 1994, after shoegaze had given way to Britpop. On Carnival of Light, Bell contributed "Birdman", "Crown Of Creation", "Endless Road", "Magical Spring", "Rolling Thunder" and "I Don't Know Where It Comes From". The band were joined at Creation Records by Oasis, who shot to fame in 1994 with their debut Definitely Maybe. As label mates, Bell was an early fan of the band and became friendly with the Gallagher brothers.

1995 saw the dissolution of the band while recording their fourth album, Tarantula, due to creative and personal tensions between the two guitarists. Bell penned several of the songs for the album, one of which – "Castle on the Hill" – has been interpreted as a lament for the band's situation. Additionally, Bell contributed "Black Nite Crash", "Sunshine / Nowhere To Run", "Dead Man", "Walk On Water", "Mary Anne", "The Dawn Patrol", "Burnin", and "Starlight Motel". Upon release of the album, it was announced that it would be deleted after one week.

In 2014, it was announced that Ride had re-formed and tour for eight months throughout in Europe and North America in 2015. This took in two headline shows at Primavera Sound and London’s Field Day. November 2016 brought further news many Ride fans have been anticipating: there would be a new album in 2017. Producer and DJ Erol Alkan broke the news on Twitter that he had been in the studio with the band, with their first album in 20 years released in Summer 2017. Weather Diaries, Ride's fifth studio album, was released on 16 June 2017 on Wichita Recordings.

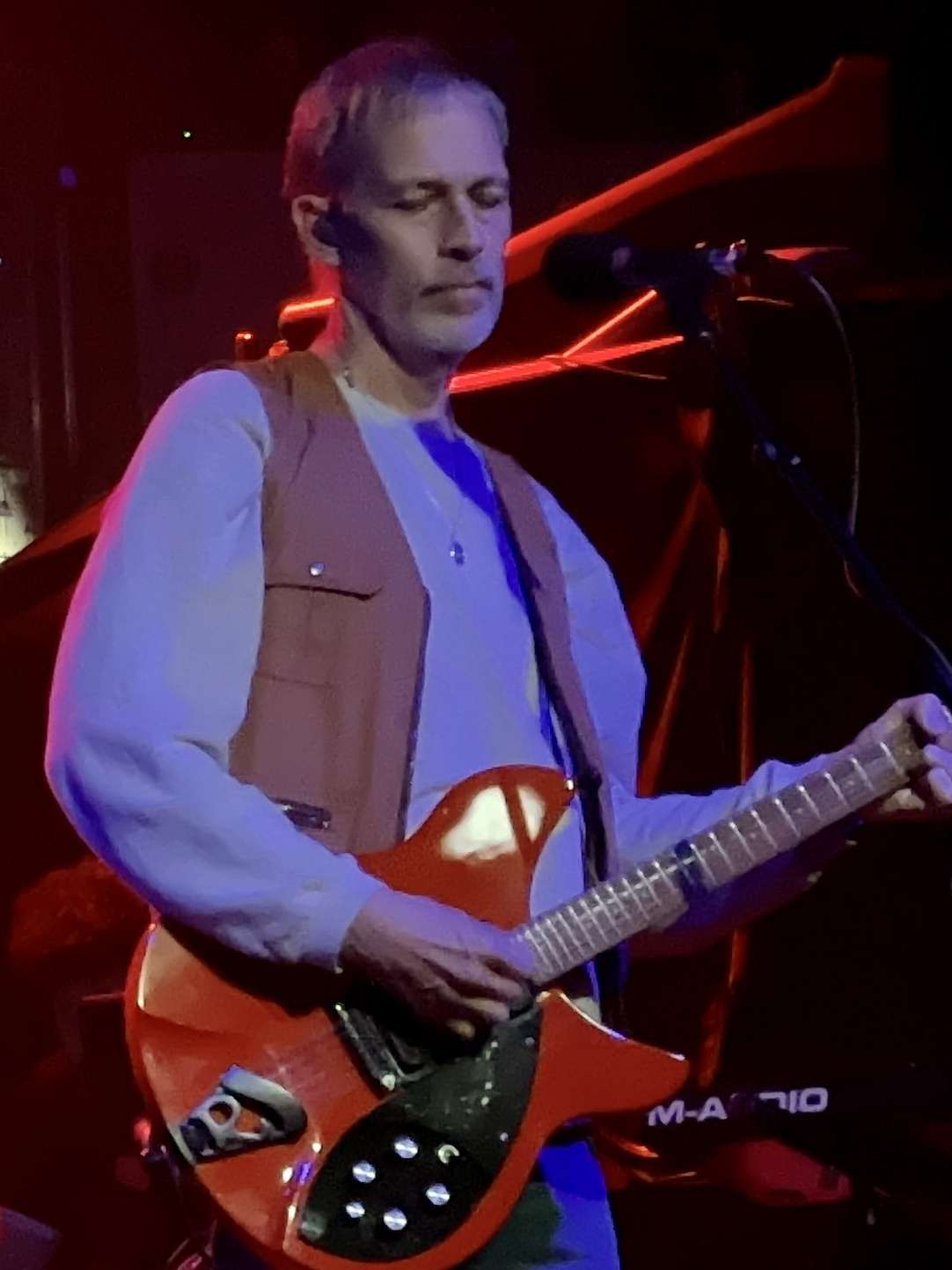
Bell performing with Ride in 2023

In August 2019, Ride released their sixth studio album, This Is Not a Safe Place, which reached number 7 in the UK charts. The release has been supported with a world tour.. While performing supporting Noel Gallagher in Taunton, Somerset in August 2023, the band confirmed that work on its latest album had been completed. On 11 January 2024, Ride announced their seventh album, Interplay.

=== Hurricane #1 ===
Bell returned in 1997 with Hurricane #1, another Creation signing. Inspired by Oasis, Bell had drafted in a more gutsy singer, Alex Lowe, who would sing the songs Bell wrote for him. The same year, they released their first album, also called Hurricane #1. Their first single, "Step into My World", reached number 29 in the UK charts (a re-mix reached number 19 that year), and other less successful singles "Just Another Illusion" and "Chain Reaction". Their second album, Only the Strongest Will Survive, was released in 1998 and the title track was released as a single reaching number 19. Notably, this album contains the only Hurricane #1 song not written by Bell, "What Do I Know?", which was written by Alex Lowe.

Hurricane #1 drew attention for their similarity to Oasis. Bell himself said "Hurricane No. 1 is not so much influenced by Oasis, it's inspired by Oasis". Their albums did not sell well in comparison to Ride. In 1999, it was falsely reported in the music press that Bell would be touring as guitarist with the band Gay Dad. But this never happened because Bell had by that time been asked to join Oasis.

=== Oasis ===
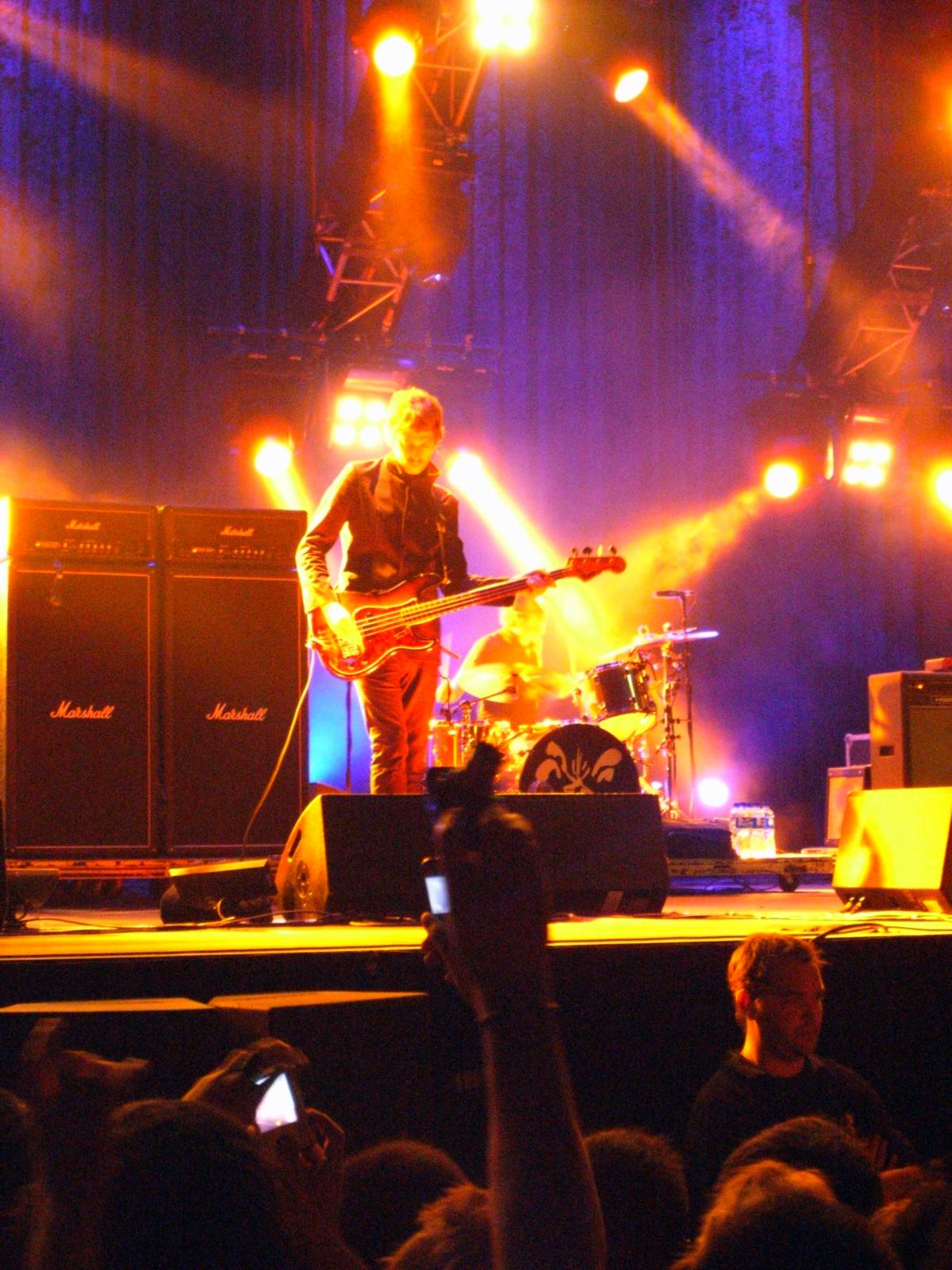
Bell playing bass guitar with Oasis in April 2009

During 1999 with Hurricane #1 on hiatus, Bell moved from Oxford to live with his wife and daughter in Sweden. Bell was invited to join Oasis because they were looking for replacements for founding members Paul Arthurs and Paul McGuigan. At the last minute Bell had to learn to play bass as well as the entire Oasis catalogue before his first gig.

While with Oasis, Bell regularly made songwriting contributions to the band. On Heathen Chemistry, Bell wrote the song "A Quick Peep". His song "Thank You For the Good Times" was featured as the B-side of "Stop Crying Your Heart Out" from the same album. On Don't Believe The Truth, he wrote "Turn Up the Sun" (which also opened every live show on the Don't Believe the Truth Tour) and "Keep the Dream Alive". On Dig Out Your Soul, he wrote "The Nature of Reality". Bell reunited with the band when they reformed and embarked on the Oasis Live '25 Tour.

=== Beady Eye ===
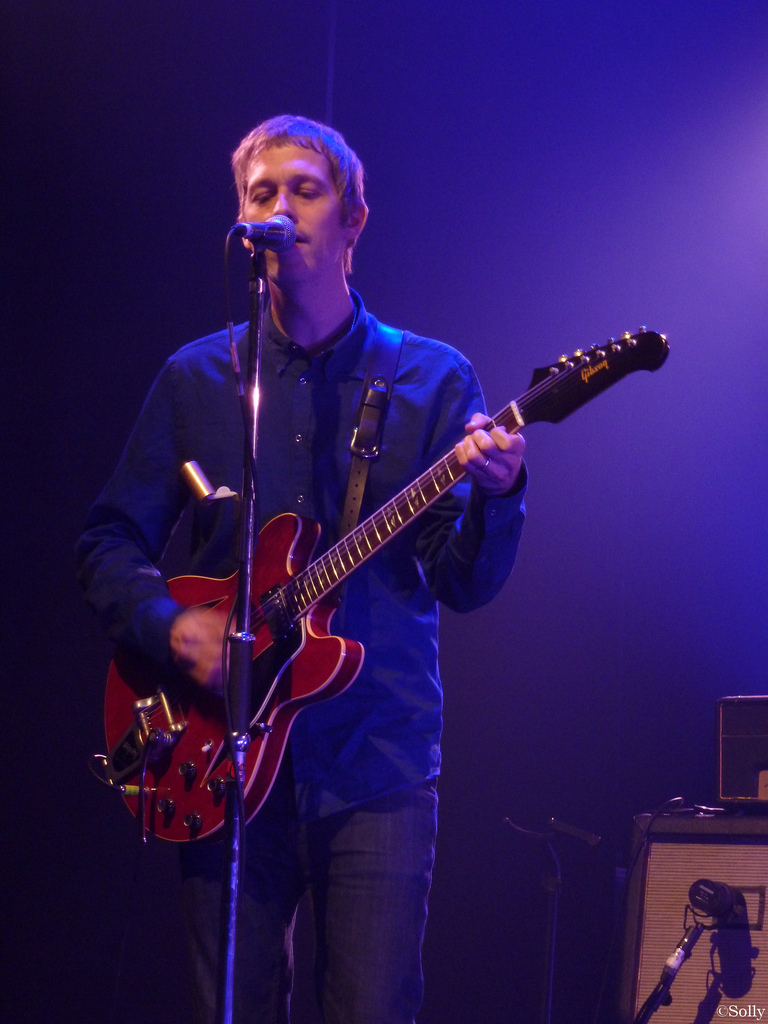
Bell performing with Beady Eye in 2011

Noel Gallagher quit Oasis in August 2009, following an argument with his brother. Following the end of Oasis, Bell and the other former members formed Beady Eye. Bell changed from playing bass to guitar, his main instrument before joining Oasis, both live and in the studio for the band. Beady Eye's debut album Different Gear, Still Speeding contains four songs written by Bell: "Four Letter Word", "Millionaire", "Kill for a Dream", and "The Beat Goes On". Bell also contributed "World Outside My Room", the B-side of "Four Letter Word".

Bell played guitar and keyboards and provided backing vocals on Beady Eye's second album, 2013's BE. It contained three songs written by Bell: "Face the Crowd", "Soon Come Tomorrow", and "I'm Just Saying", and also co-wrote "Flick of the Finger". He also contributed "Dreaming of Some Space" to the B-side of "Second Bite of the Apple". Beady Eye disbanded in October 2014.

=== Production work ===
In addition to being a songwriter and musician, Bell has been involved for a number of years in record production. He received co-production credit for both albums recorded by Hurricane #1.

During late 1995, after the sessions for Tarantula were completed but prior to the official announcement of Ride's break-up, Bell undertook production duties on Britpop band The Kynd's debut single "Egotripper", which was released in October 1996.

Bell also undertook production duties for the fifth studio album Fear & Love by Swedish band Weeping Willows, released in 2007. Weeping Willows draws upon early Roy Orbison and The Smiths as their main influences. On Fear & Love, Bell brought some English folk music influences, and some 1960s styled British Invasion sounds. The album was more or less recorded live in the studio, by playing the songs until the band got them right with minimal digital post-production. Weeping Willows prior two albums relied on extensive post-production and remix styled studio techniques. Reaching number 2 in the Swedish charts, Scandinavian music critics have given Fear & Love a warm welcome and compared some songs to The Coral, The Verve, Talk Talk and Oasis.

=== Solo activities and projects ===
Bell has been good friends with Magnus Carlson, the lead singer in Weeping Willows, and together they have embarked on some musical projects. Bell and Carlsson were resident DJs at Swedish club, Bangers 'n' Mash during the mid-noughties. Bell also undertakes occasional DJ sets in UK clubs, for example, "This Feeling" nightclub in London. In 2003, Bell collaborated with the Stockholm-based Irish-Swedish electronica/acid house duo, DK7, by providing guitar on the tracks "Heart Like a Demon" and "White Shadow" for their Disarmed album. During the autumn of 2006 Carlson and Bell teamed up with Janne Schaffer and performed at an event dedicated to the late 1970s singer-songwriter, Ted Gärdestad. In addition to his role as producer, Bell played a number of instruments on eight of the twelve tracks on the 2007 album Fear & Love by Weeping Willows, ranging from glockenspiel and piano to guitar. He has also performed solo gigs at smaller Swedish summer festivals including the 2006 'Fest-i-val' in Umeå Sweden.

On May 10, 2007, Bell played the bass on "Arnold Layne" with Pink Floyd regulars David Gilmour, Richard Wright, Nick Mason and Jon Carin at The Madcap's Last Laugh, a tribute concert to Pink Floyd's recently deceased founding member, Syd Barrett, at Barbican Hall in London.

In July 2007, Bell appeared with friend and former fellow Ride member Mark Gardener onstage with Californian rock band The Brian Jonestown Massacre at the Oxford "Truck" Music Festival On 19 December 2007, Bell joined Weeping Willows on stage for an event called "An Evening With Weeping Willows at Chinateatern". He lined up with other guests such as The Soundtrack of Our Lives' Martin Hederos, Echo & the Bunnymen vocalist Ian McCulloch and Jens Lekman.

Bell has worked with Swedish band The Most on various recordings and contributed guitars and vocals on the song "Now I Feel" from the EP Moderation in Moderation (a title suggested by Bell). He stated on several occasions his intention to record and release a solo album. He said, "I will get around to it, it's just waiting for the songs to turn up that suit my voice. I've got one so far, give me about five years and I'll have an album's worth."

During 2008, Bell collaborated with British-American electronica group SPC ECO on the track "Silver Clouds", on which he plays an electronic sitar drone machine and an old custom Appalachian dulcimer, as well as devising the song's lyrics. The song was made available in 2009 as a bonus track to the Japanese edition of SPC ECO's album 3-D. In 2009 he released his first solo recording under the Grapefruit name, an instrumental track also entitled "Grapefruit" which he contributed to the One by One: KZK Adidas Originals by Originals compilation album, a Japan-only release via Sony Music.

Bell released his first solo single "Plastic Bag" on 23 October 2019 on 7 inch clear vinyl as a subscription for the Sonic Cathedral Singles Club. "Plastic Bag" and its B-side "The Commune", were reissued digitally on 10 July 2020. His second solo single, and the first single from his debut solo album, "Love Comes in Waves", was released on 11 August 2020.

Bell released his debut studio album, The View from Half Way Down on 9 October 2020 through Sonic Cathedral.

In 2022, Bell released his second solo album, Flicker, released as both single-CD and double-LP through Sonic Cathedral.

In 2023, Bell became part of the supergroup Mantra of the Cosmos with Shaun Ryder, Zak Starkey and Bez releasing their debut single "Gorilla Guerilla" in June ahead of a performance at the Glastonbury Festival.

In February 2025, Bell released his third solo album, Pinball Wanderer on CD, LP and digitally via Sonic Cathedral.

=== Scoring and soundtracks ===
In 2015, Bell scored the short film Midnight of My Life and worked as a producer on Dave Galafassi's track "Hello Halo"; it was performed by actress Toni Collette on the soundtrack to the romantic comedy film Miss You Already.

== Personal life ==
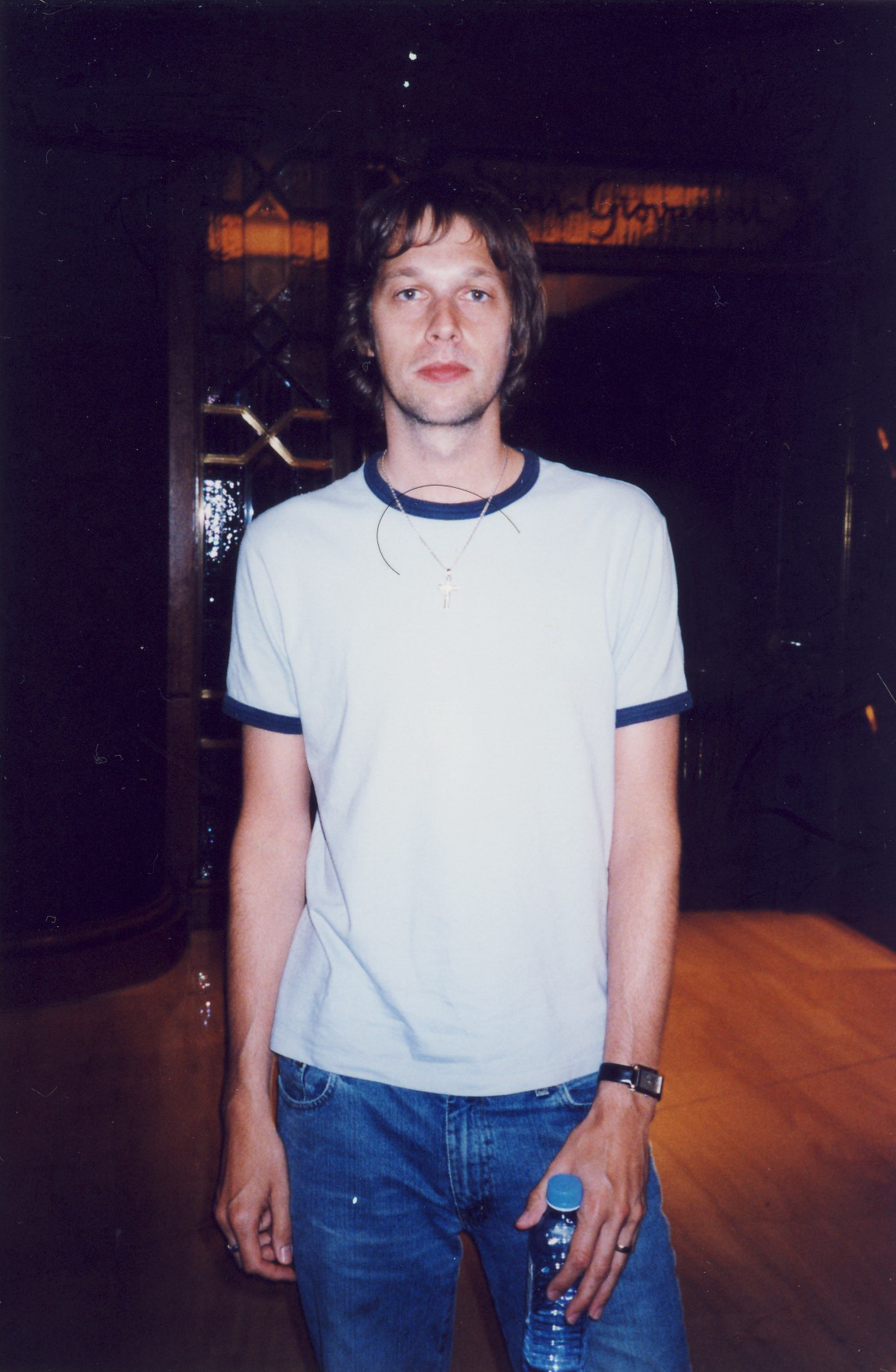
Bell in 2001

Bell was previously married to Swedish singer Idha Övelius. They have two children, a daughter, Leia, and a son, Leon. He currently resides in London and has been married to Shiarra, a label rep from Universal Music Group, since 2010. Together, they have two children, a daughter born in 2012 and a son born in 2014.

== Discography ==
=== Studio albums ===
Title	Album details
The View from Halfway Down	Released: 9 October 2020; Label: Sonic Cathedral; Format: CD, DL, LP
Pattern Recognition (as GLOK)	Released: 15 October 2021
Flicker	Released: 11 February 2022; Label: Sonic Cathedral; Format: CD, DL, LP
Tidal Love Numbers (with Masal)	Released: 19 May 2023; Label: Sonic Cathedral; Format: CD, DL, LP
Pinball Wanderer	Released: 28 February 2025; Label: Sonic Cathedral; Format: CD, DL, LP

=== EPs ===
Title	EP details
The Indica Gallery EP	Released: 9 April 2021
See My Friends EP	Released: 14 May 2021
All on You EP	Released: 11 June 2021
I Am a Strange Loop EP	Released: 7 October 2022
The Grounding Process EP	Released: 4 November 2022
Untitled Film Stills EP	Released: 25 November 2022; Type: covers

=== Singles ===
Year	Title	Album
2019	"Plastic Bag"	non-album single
2020	"Plastic Bag" (re-issue)	non-album single
2020	"Love Comes in Waves"	The View from Halfway Down
2020	"Cherry Cola"	The View from Halfway Down
2021	"Skywalker"	The View from Halfway Down
2022	"Something Like Love"	Flicker
2022	"World of Echo"	Flicker
2022	"Lifeline"	Flicker
2023	"Tidal Love Conversation in That Familiar Golden Orchard" (with Masal)	Tidal Love Numbers
2023	"Murmuration of Warm Dappled Light on Her Back After Swimming" (with Masal)	Tidal Love Numbers
2023	"Hallogallo" (Live) (with Masal)	non-album single

=== Other appearances ===
Year	Title	Album
2021	"Tories in Jail" (as GLOK)	Time at the Vortex EP

=== Compilation albums ===
Year	Title	Notes
2019	Dissident (as GLOK)	released and unreleased songs
2021	Another View	Compilation of three EPs; The Indica Gallery, See My Friends & All on You.
2023	Strange Loops & Outer Psych	acoustic versions, remixes, covers of songs that inspired Flicker album
