= Supergrass discography =

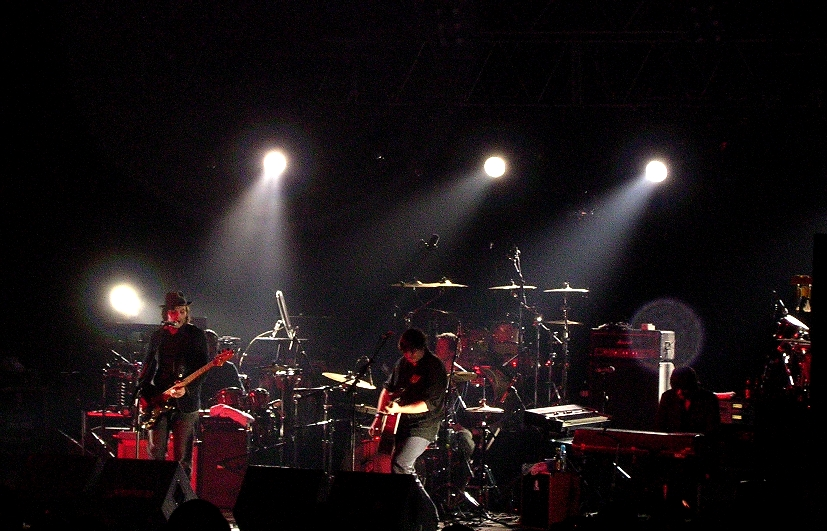
- Supergrass in concert in 2005
- Studio albums: 6
- Extended plays: 3
- Live albums: 1
- Compilation albums: 3
- Singles: 26
- Music videos: 24

The discography of Supergrass, an English alternative rock band, consists of six studio albums, three extended plays, two compilation albums, 26 singles and 24 music videos. They were formed in 1993 by Gaz Coombes, Mick Quinn and Danny Goffey. Rising to prominence during the Britpop era in the mid-1990s with their single "Alright", they were joined by Rob Coombes in 2002 (keyboards) until their demise on 11 June 2010.

The band released their first single "Caught by the Fuzz" on small independent record label, Backbeat records, on a limited run of 500. In October 1994 the single was re-released on the Parlophone label and reached number 43 on the UK Singles Chart. Supergrass released their debut full-length album, I Should Coco, in May 1995. The album reached number one on the UK Albums Chart and led to the band receiving four newcomer awards. The album's biggest hit single was "Alright", which reached number two on the UK Singles Chart. This is the joint highest chart position the band have gained for a single together with "Richard III" from their second album, In It for the Money. This was the first album to be produced entirely by the band and peaked at number two on the UK Albums Chart. Their third self-titled album Supergrass, often referred to as "the X-ray" album due to the picture on the sleeve, peaked at number three on the UK Albums Chart. Their fourth album, Life On Other Planets was the first to include Rob Coombes as an official member of the band. The album peaked at number nine on the UK Albums Chart.

In 2004, the band released a singles compilation entitled Supergrass Is 10 to celebrate ten years since the band's formation. This is available on CD and DVD format. The DVD version features a documentary film, in which the band members recall moments during their career in the group. This also shows behind-the-scenes footage of recording sessions and live performances.

Fifth album, Road to Rouen, was recorded in Normandy, France, where the band created their own, purpose built, studio. Released in 2005, it peaked at number nine on the UK Albums Chart. First single St. Petersburg reached number 22 on the UK singles chart and featured a distinctive video directed by Borkur Sigthorsson. Diamond Hoo Ha is the sixth album from the band. It peaked at number 19 on the UK Albums Chart, which made this release their lowest-charting album to date. The song "Diamond Hoo Ha Man" was first played live at Guilfest and this was recorded and made available as a free download via the band's website. "Rebel in You", from Diamond Hoo Ha, was released independently on Supergrass Records following their split from EMI, as a limited edition run of 1500, vinyl-only singles.

In 2017, Supergrass' back catalogue was bought by BMG from Warner Music, who then put it under The Echo Label, one of their artist catalogue companies, who released the box set The Strange Ones 1994–2008 in 2020 as the start of their re-issue campaign.

== Albums ==
=== Studio albums ===
| Title | Details | Peak chart positions | | | | | | | | | | Sales | Certifications |
| Title | Details | UK | AUS | FIN | FRA | JPN | NLD | NOR | NZ | SWE | US | Sales | Certifications |
|---|---|---|---|---|---|---|---|---|---|---|---|---|---|
| I Should Coco | Released: 15 May 1995; Label: Parlophone (PCS #7373); Formats: CD, cassette, LP | 1 | 57 | 32 | — | 55 | 73 | — | 20 | 36 | — | UK: 500,000 | BPI: Platinum |
| In It for the Money | Released: 21 April 1997; Label: Parlophone (PCS #7388); Formats: CD, cassette, LP | 2 | 28 | 37 | 36 | 29 | 68 | 23 | 7 | 27 | — | | BPI: Platinum |
| Supergrass | Released: 20 September 1999; Label: Parlophone (#5220562); Formats: CD, cassette, LP, MiniDisc | 3 | 15 | — | 42 | 39 | 32 | 4 | 7 | 26 | — | | BPI: Platinum |
| Life on Other Planets | Released: 30 September 2002; Label: Parlophone (#5418002); Formats: CD, LP | 9 | 22 | — | 44 | 73 | — | 13 | — | — | 195 | | BPI: Gold |
| Road to Rouen | Released: 15 August 2005; Label: Parlophone (#3333342); Formats: CD, LP | 9 | 67 | — | 85 | 298 | 63 | — | — | — | — | | BPI: Silver |
| Diamond Hoo Ha | Released: 24 March 2008; Label: Parlophone (#5197342); Formats: CD, LP, digital download | 19 | 78 | — | 66 | — | — | — | — | — | — | | |
"—" denotes albums that did not chart.

=== Live albums ===
| Title | Details |
|---|---|
| Live on Other Planets | Released: 27 November 2020; Label: Supergrass Records (SGCD01XX); Formats: CD, LP |

=== Compilation albums ===
| Title | Details | Peak chart positions | Certifications |
| Title | Details | UK | Certifications |
|---|---|---|---|
| B-Side Trax | Released: 25 January 2000; Label: EMI (TOCP #61033); Released in Japan only | — | |
| Supergrass Is 10 | Released: 7 June 2004; Label: Parlophone (#570 8602); Formats: CD, 10" vinyl, DVD | 4 | BPI: Gold |
| Supergrass: The Albums Collection | Released: 21 September 2009; Label: Parlophone; Formats: CD, digital download | — | |
| The Strange Ones: 1994–2008 | Released: 24 January 2020; Label: The Echo Label/BMG; Formats: CD, LP | 52 | |
| The Strange Ones: 1994–2008 Super Deluxe Box Set | Released: 24 January 2020; Label: The Echo Label/BMG; Formats: 13×CD 6×LP 1× vinyl 45 / memorablilia | — | |
"—" denotes albums that did not chart.

== Extended plays ==
| Title | Details |
|---|---|
| Introducing... Supergrass | Released: 20 September 1999; Label: Parlophone |
| Supertunes | Released: 11 December 2006; Label: Parlophone |
| Live from London^{[A]} | Released: 22 January 2008; Label: Parlophone; Format: Digital download |

Notes

- A Released exclusively through iTunes.

== Singles ==
| Title | Year | Peak chart positions | | | | | | | | | | Certifications | Album |
| Title | Year | UK | AUS | CAN Alt | FIN | FRA | IRL | NLD | NZ | NOR | US Mod Rock | Certifications | Album |
|---|---|---|---|---|---|---|---|---|---|---|---|---|---|
| "Caught by the Fuzz" | 1994 | 43 | 95 | — | — | — | — | — | — | — | — | | I Should Coco |
| "Mansize Rooster" | 1994 | 20 | 131 | — | — | — | — | — | — | — | — | | I Should Coco |
| "Lose It" | 1995 | 75 | — | — | — | — | — | — | — | — | — | | I Should Coco |
| "Lenny" | 1995 | 10 | — | — | — | — | — | — | — | — | — | | I Should Coco |
| "Alright" / "Time" | 1995 | 2 | 96 | — | — | 30 | 8 | — | — | 2 | — | BPI: Platinum | I Should Coco |
| "Going Out" | 1996 | 5 | — | — | — | — | 20 | — | — | — | — | | In It for the Money |
| "Richard III" | 1997 | 2 | 75 | — | — | — | 30 | — | — | — | — | | In It for the Money |
| "Sun Hits the Sky" | 1997 | 10 | 112 | — | — | — | — | 81 | — | — | — | | In It for the Money |
| "Cheapskate" | 1997 | — | — | 11 | — | — | — | — | — | — | 35 | | In It for the Money |
| "Late in the Day" | 1997 | 18 | — | — | — | — | — | — | — | — | — | | In It for the Money |
| "We Still Need More (Than Anyone Can Give)" | 1998 | — | — | — | — | — | — | — | — | — | — | | Dead Man on Campus |
| "Pumping on Your Stereo" | 1999 | 11 | — | 13 | — | — | 29 | 70 | 11 | — | — | BPI: Silver | Supergrass |
| "Moving" | 1999 | 9 | — | — | 14 | — | — | 81 | — | — | — | BPI: Silver | Supergrass |
| "Mary" | 1999 | 36 | — | — | — | — | — | — | — | — | — | | Supergrass |
| "Never Done Nothing Like That Before" | 2002 | 75 | — | — | — | — | — | — | — | — | — | | Life on Other Planets |
| "Grace" | 2002 | 13 | — | — | — | — | — | — | — | 18 | — | | Life on Other Planets |
| "Seen the Light" | 2003 | 22 | — | — | — | — | — | — | — | — | — | | Life on Other Planets |
| "Rush Hour Soul" | 2003 | — | — | — | — | — | — | — | — | — | — | | Life on Other Planets |
| "Kiss of Life" | 2004 | 23 | — | — | — | — | — | — | — | — | — | | Supergrass Is 10 |
| "St. Petersburg" | 2005 | 22 | — | — | — | — | — | — | — | — | — | | Road to Rouen |
| "Low C" | 2005 | 52 | — | — | — | — | — | — | — | — | — | | Road to Rouen |
| "Fin" | 2006 | 111 | — | — | — | — | — | — | — | — | — | | Road to Rouen |
| "Diamond Hoo Ha Man" | 2008 | — | — | — | — | — | — | — | — | — | — | | Diamond Hoo Ha |
| "Bad Blood" | 2008 | 73 | — | — | — | — | — | — | — | — | — | | Diamond Hoo Ha |
| "Rebel in You" | 2008 | — | — | — | — | — | — | — | — | — | — | | Diamond Hoo Ha |
| "Sofa (Of My Lethargy)" | 2015 | — | — | — | — | — | — | — | — | — | — | | I Should Coco 20th anniversary edition |
| "Don't Leave Me Alone" | 2026 | — | — | — | — | — | — | — | — | — | — | | Road To Rouen 20th anniversary edition |
"—" denotes singles that did not chart or were not released in that particular country.

== Music videos ==
| Title | Year | Director |
|---|---|---|
| "Caught by the Fuzz" (US & UK versions) | 1994 | Dom and Nic |
| "Caught by the Fuzz" (Acoustic version) | 1994 | Dom and Nic |
| "Mansize Rooster" | 1995 | Dom and Nic |
| "Lenny" | 1995 | Dom and Nic |
| "Alright" | 1995 | Dom and Nic |
| "Time" | 1995 | Dom and Nic |
| "Going Out" | 1996 | Dom and Nic |
| "Richard III" | 1997 | Dom and Nic |
| "Sun Hits the Sky" | 1997 | Dom and Nic |
| "Late in the Day" | 1997 | Dom and Nic |
| "Cheapskate" | 1997 | Dom and Nic |
| "We Still Need More (Than Anyone Can Give)" | 1999 | Roman Coppola |
| "Pumping on Your Stereo" | 1999 | Hammer & Tongs |
| "Moving" | 1999 | Nick Gordon |
| "Mary" | 1999 | Sophie Muller |
| "Grace" | 2002 | Dom and Nic |
| "Seen the Light" | 2003 | Simon Hilton |
| "Rush Hour Soul" | 2003 | Dom and Nic |
| "Lose It" | 2004 | Dom and Nic |
| "Kiss of Life" | 2004 | Dom and Nic |
| "St. Petersburg" | 2005 | Borkur Sigthorsson |
| "Low C" | 2005 | Garth Jennings |
| "Fin" | 2006 | Supergrass |
| "Diamond Hoo Ha Man" | 2008 | Charly Coombes (as Chas Harrison) |
| "Bad Blood" | 2008 | Keith Schofield |
| "Next to You" | 2019 | |
