= Late in the Day =

1997 single by Supergrass

Single by Supergrass

from the album In It for the Money
- B-side: "We Still Need More (Than Anyone Can Give)"
- Released: 6 October 1997
- Studio: Sawmills (Golant, England)
- Genre: Britpop
- Length: 4:45
- Label: Parlophone
- Songwriters: Supergrass, Rob Coombes
- Producers: Supergrass, John Cornfield

Supergrass singles chronology
"Sun Hits the Sky" (1997)	"Late in the Day" (1997)	"Cheapskate" (1997)

Alternative cover
- CD 2 single cover

"Late in the Day" was the fourth single from Britpop band Supergrass' second studio album, In It for the Money (1997). It was released in October 1997 and reached number 18 on the UK Singles Chart. The song also charted in Iceland, peaking at number 32 in November 1997. The two CD releases of the single have the same photo as their cover but the colours of one have been reversed on the second one.

"We Still Need More (Than Anyone Can Give)" features as a B-side to this single, it was later released as a separate single as part of the Dead Man On Campus soundtrack, along with two other songs by different bands.

== Music video ==
The video, directed by Dom and Nic, is shot entirely in black and white film and begins with Gaz Coombes sitting on a sofa in front of a large window. There is a cigarette smoking in an ashtray on a table beside him, as he plays an acoustic guitar to "Late in the Day". The camera gradually zooms in and he starts to sing along halfway through the first verse. As the chorus begins, Gaz looks over to Danny Goffey and Mick Quinn, who are standing outside the film set with pogo sticks. They throw one to him and they pogo out to the street together, with Gaz still singing to the track. The second verse starts and there is a downpour of rain; a content couple gaze at the band from under an umbrella, and the film is slowed down slightly.

The rain abruptly stops to mark the chorus and the film returns to normal speed. Next, Rob Coombes drives a Hackney cab to the end of a road, indicating in wait to turn out onto the main road and waiting for a double decker bus to get out of his way. He looks out in surprise as his bandmates pogo across the bonnet of the car. During the middle eight the footage slows once more as Supergrass pogo across London's Albert Bridge and through Battersea Park. They then enter a more urban street as Danny pogos one-legged and the rest of the band pogo on the spot or in circles. The chorus is played once more and the film put back to normal speed, as the camera 'jumps' along with Supergrass in Battersea Park once more (the bandstand in the background is in fact the same one on which the video for "Going Out" was filmed.) The footage slows again and the video ends.

The video is one of several included on the Supergrass Is 10 compilation DVD. It was also nominated for 'Best British Video' in the BRIT Awards of 1998.

=== Other videos ===
"We Still Need More (Than Anyone Can Give)" also had its own music video featuring the band driving a car into a stack of televisions. The video was directed by Roman Coppola.

== Track listings ==
UK CD1 (CDRS 6484)

1. "Late in the Day"
2. "We Still Need More (Than Anyone Can Give)"
3. "It's Not Me" (demo)

UK CD2 (CDR 6484)

1. "Late in the Day"
2. "Don't Be Cruel"
3. "The Animal"

UK limited-edition 7-inch single and European CD single (R 6484; 7243 8 84839 2 6)

1. "Late in the Day"
2. "We Still Need More (Than Anyone Can Give)"

== Credits and personnel ==
Credits are taken from the In It for the Money album liner notes.

Studio

- Recorded at Sawmills Studio (Golant, England)

Personnel

- Supergrass – writing, production, mixing
- Rob Coombes – writing
- John Cornfield – production
- Sam Williams – mixing

== Charts ==
Chart (1997)	Peak position
Europe (Eurochart Hot 100)	82
Iceland (Íslenski Listinn Topp 40)	32
Scottish Singles Sales (Official Charts)	15
UK Singles (Official Charts)	18
