= Supergrass Is 10 =

Compilation album by Supergrass
- Released: 7 June 2004
- Recorded: 1994–2004
- Genres: Alternative rock; Britpop
- Length: 71:18
- Label: Parlophone
- Producers: Supergrass; various

Supergrass chronology
Life on Other Planets (2002)	Supergrass Is 10 (2004)	Road to Rouen (2005)

Singles from Supergrass Is 10
- 1. "Kiss of Life" Released: 24 May 2004 (UK)

Professional ratings
Review scores
Source	Rating
AllMusic	5/5 stars
Blender	4/5 stars
NME	10/10
Pitchfork	8.5/10
PopMatters	(Positive)
Q	4/5 stars
Yahoo Music	8/10 stars

Supergrass Is 10 is a compilation album celebrating the first 10 years of the band Supergrass. It includes singles from their first release, "Caught by the Fuzz" (1994), to their then latest release, "Kiss of Life" (2004).

The compilation was released on CD, DVD and double 10" clear vinyl record. The DVD release contains two discs. The first disc is a documentary of the band's first 10 years. The second disc contains videos of all of the singles (with the exception of "Cheapskate") with the option of director's commentary and karaoke lyrics. The song compilation managed to reach No. 4 in the UK charts.

In the US, the CD version came with a bonus live CD featuring 12 live and acoustic songs.

John Cornfield recorded and mixed the two new tracks featured on the album at Sphere Studios.

The Guardian newspaper said of the DVD compilation, "Once you've sat through the in-depth, career-spanning documentary on disc one, it's hard to come to any conclusion other than being Supergrass is probably the most joyful job in the world."

== Track listing ==
CD 570 8602 and double clear 10" 578 9941

1. "Caught by the Fuzz" – 2:19
2. "Pumping on Your Stereo" – 3:20
3. "Alright" – 3:03
4. "Moving" – 4:27
5. "Richard III" – 3:21
6. "Grace" – 2:32
7. "Late in the Day" – 4:47
8. "Seen the Light" – 2:27
9. "Mansize Rooster" – 2:40
10. "Sun Hits the Sky" – 4:54
11. "Kiss of Life" – 4:03
12. "Mary" – 4:02
13. "Going Out" – 4:16
14. "Lenny" – 2:42
15. "Bullet" – 2:32
16. "It's Not Me" – 2:57
17. "Rush Hour Soul" – 2:56
18. "Strange Ones" – 3:59
19. "Lose It" – 2:39
20. "Time" – 3:14
21. "Wait for the Sun" – 4:08

The tracks on this compilation are taken from the following Supergrass albums:

- 1, 3, 9, 14, 18, 19, 20 - I Should Coco (1995)
- 2, 4, 12 - Supergrass (1999)
- 5, 7, 10, 13, 16, 21 - In It For The Money (1997)
- 6, 8, 17 - Life on Other Planets (2002)

Finally, tracks 11 and 15, " Kiss of Life" and "Bullet" are new songs, not released previously.

Supergrass Is 10 bonus live CD/DD (US only)

This was available free of charge with the first US pressings of the album, and could also be downloaded for free from iTunes if you had already bought the actual Supergrass is 10 full album download.

1. "Kiss of Life" (live) – 4:12
2. "Pumping on Your Stereo" (live) – 3:25
3. "Grace" (live) – 2:33
4. "Time" (live) – 3:37
5. "Moving" (live) – 5:08
6. "Late in the Day" (live acoustic) – 3:58
7. "Wait for the Sun" (live acoustic) – 3:20
8. "Caught by the Fuzz" (live acoustic) – 2:47
9. "Strange Ones" (live) – 4:08
10. "Hollow Little Reign" (live) – 3:35
11. "Mansize Rooster" (live) – 2:43
12. "Sun Hits the Sky" (live) – 6:28

== DVD video listing ==
=== Disc 1 ===
- A Home Movie: Documentary Film
  - Director and editor: Simon Hilton
  - Producer: James Chads
  - Production company: Maguffin
  - DVD mastering: Abbey Road Interactive

=== Disc 2* ===
1. "Caught by the Fuzz" – 2:19
2. "Mansize Rooster" – 2:34
3. "Lenny" – 2:42
4. "Alright" – 3:13
5. "Time" – 3:27
6. "Going Out" – 4:17
7. "Richard III" – 3:10
8. "Sun Hits the Sky" – 4:44
9. "Late in the Day" – 5:04
10. "We Still Need More (Than Anyone Can Give)" – 3:46
11. "Pumping on Your Stereo" – 3:20
12. "Moving" – 4:24
13. "Mary" – 4:10
14. "Grace" – 2:43
15. "Seen the Light" – 2:45
16. "Rush Hour Soul" – 2:58

*All are music videos.

Extras*

1. "Kiss of Life" – 3:45
2. "Lose It"
3. "Caught by the Fuzz" (acoustic) – 3:03
4. "Richard III" Player Cam – shows individual members of the band.

*All are music videos, apart from Richard III.
