= Richard III (song) =

1997 single by Supergrass

Single by Supergrass

from the album In It for the Money
- B-side: "Sometimes I Make You Sad"; "Sometimes We're Very Sad"; "Nothing More's Gonna Get in My Way"; "20ft Halo"
- Released: 31 March 1997
- Studio: Sawmills (Golant, UK)
- Genre: Rock
- Length: 3:13
- Label: Parlophone
- Songwriters: Supergrass; Rob Coombes
- Producers: Supergrass; John Cornfield

Supergrass singles chronology
"Going Out" (1996)	"Richard III" (1997)	"Sun Hits the Sky" (1997)

Alternative cover
- CD 2 single cover

"Richard III" is a song by English rock band Supergrass. It was the second single released from the band's second album, In It for the Money (1997), after "Going Out", which was released over a year before. "Richard III" was released in March 1997 and reached number two on the UK Singles Chart on 6 April, their highest placing since "Alright" / "Time" in 1995, which also peaked at number two. The song also reached number 21 in Iceland and number 30 in Ireland.

The song's name comes from the band's method of creating working titles for songs—giving them people's names. This was the third called "Richard" and the band liked the reference to the king Richard III and the Shakespeare play Richard III in which the king is depicted as a dark and evil character, as it matched the menacing tone of the song. Neither the king nor the play is mentioned in the song. Both the 2nd CD (of the CD release format) and the 7-inch vinyl format have the "Richard III" cover design but with the colours altered instead. A Peel session of the song was released on the CD single for "Mary".

== B-sides ==
The B-side "Sometimes I Make You Sad" is an atypical song for the group and features a number of production techniques. The only use of percussion in the song is a cymbal; the drum noises were instead simulated by members of the band making grunting noises. These were then put on a loop. The guitar solo was written during the recording of In It For The Money; it was recorded at half speed then sped up to achieve the mandolin-like sound. "Sometimes We're Very Sad" was not a song, but was actually audio of the band, attempting to record the grunting noises heard on "Sometimes I Make You Sad" without laughing. Gaz Coombes is also heard at the end saying how badly the recording is going, by explaining how they had "murdered Mickey's song" and how "his arse hurts".

== Music video ==
The music video, like many others in Supergrass's career, was directed by Nic (drummer Danny Goffey's brother) and Dom. It shows the band playing "Richard III" in a basement, with a slight feel of unease and possibly hate about them. Mick Quinn tries to run away, but is pulled back with a guitar led by Danny. Mick then falls to the floor, his nose bleeding. He stares at the TV, and Rob Coombes is playing the theremin. It then goes back to Gaz Coombes and Danny playing the song, and then a drop of water hits an electrical wire, causing a massive electrical burst and in so doing, prompts the beginning of the guitar solo. The video then ends with the opening sequence played in reverse.

Nic and Dom joked in the Supergrass Is 10 DVD that this music video was "one of the occasions where we nearly killed the band". The reason for this is that they covered the room with Fuller's earth, which they later found out to be harmful to humans. The earth can be seen being knocked from Danny's drums whenever he hits them. Gaz Coombes plays his red Gibson SG guitar in the video.

== Track listings ==
UK CD1

1. "Richard III"
2. "Sometimes I Make You Sad"
3. "Sometimes We're Very Sad"

UK CD2

1. "Richard III"
2. "Nothing More's Gonna Get in My Way"
3. "20ft Halo"

UK limited-edition 7-inch yellow-vinyl single

A. "Richard III"
B. "Nothing More's Gonna Get In My Way"

Australian CD single

1. "Richard III"
2. "Nothing More's Gonna Get in My Way"
3. "20ft Halo"
4. "Sometimes I Make You Sad"

Japanese CD single

1. "Richard III"
2. "Nothing More's Gonna Get in My Way"
3. "20ft Halo"
4. "Sometimes I Make You Sad"
5. "Sometimes We're Very Sad"

== Credits and personnel ==
Credits are taken from the In It for the Money album liner notes.

Studio

- Recorded at Sawmills Studio (Golant, UK)

Personnel

- Supergrass – writing, production, mixing
- Rob Coombes – writing
- Sam Williams – theremin
- John Cornfield – production, mixing

== Charts ==
=== Weekly charts ===
Weekly chart performance for "Richard III"
Chart (1997)	Peak position
Australia (ARIA)	75
Europe (Eurochart Hot 100)	12
Iceland (Íslenski Listinn Topp 40)	21
Ireland (IRMA)	30
Israel (IBA)	37
Scottish Singles Sales (Official Charts)	2
UK Singles (Official Charts)	2

=== Year-end charts ===
Year-end chart performance for "Richard III"
Chart (1997)	Position
UK Singles (OCC)	130

== Release history ==
Release dates and formats for "Richard III"
Region	Date	Format(s)	Label(s)	Ref.
United Kingdom	31 March 1997	7-inch vinyl; CD	Parlophone	
Japan	16 April 1997	CD	Parlophone; EMI	
