= Cheapskate (song) =

1997 single by Supergrass

Single by Supergrass

from the album In It for the Money
- B-side: "Going Out"
- Released: 1997
- Studio: Sawmills (Golant, UK)
- Length: 2:41
- Label: Capitol
- Songwriters: Supergrass; Rob Coombes
- Producers: Supergrass; John Cornfield

Supergrass singles chronology
"Late in the Day" (1997)	"Cheapskate" (1997)	"Pumping on Your Stereo" (1999)

"Cheapskate" is a song from English rock band Supergrass's second album, In It for the Money (1997). It was released only in the United States and Canada in 1997, rising to number 35 on the US Billboard Hot Modern Rock Tracks chart and number 11 on the Canadian RPM Alternative 30. While being only a 7-inch jukebox single with "Going Out", it has an accompanying music video that was left off the Supergrass Is 10 DVD. The song is said by the band themselves to have drawn influences from Kool & the Gang.

== Credits and personnel ==
Credits are taken from the In It for the Money album liner notes.

Studio

- Recorded at Sawmills Studio (Golant, UK)

Personnel

- Supergrass – writing, production, mixing, co-arrangement
- Rob Coombes – writing
- John Cornfield – production
- Sam Williams – mixing, co-arrangement

== Charts ==
Chart (1997)	Peak position
Canada Rock/Alternative (RPM)	11
US Alternative Airplay (Billboard)	35
