= Alright (Supergrass song) =

1995 single by Supergrass

Single by Supergrass

from the album I Should Coco
- A-side: "Time"
- B-side: "Condition"; "Je suis votre papa sucre"
- Released: 3 July 1995
- Recorded: 1994
- Studio: Sawmills (Golant, England)
- Genre: Britpop
- Length: 3:00
- Label: Parlophone
- Songwriter: Supergrass
- Producer: Sam Williams

Supergrass singles chronology
"Lenny" (1995)	"Alright" / "Time" (1995)	"Going Out" (1996)

Official video
- "Alright" on YouTube

"Alright" is a song by English alternative rock band Supergrass. It was released with "Time" as a double A-side single from their debut album, I Should Coco (1995), on 3 July 1995 through Parlophone. It was concurrently released on the soundtrack of the 1995 movie Clueless, which helped it become a big hit for the band. "Alright" peaked at number two on the UK Singles Chart, number six in Iceland, number eight in Ireland, number 21 in Finland and number 30 in France. The music video for the song was directed by Dom and Nic and filmed at Portmeirion in North Wales.

== Music and lyrics ==
The "bona fide teen anthem", with its upbeat lyrics and cheerful piano tune, seemed to epitomise British youth culture at the time, when Britpop was at its height. The band's youthful appearance (lead singer Gaz Coombes was 19 at the time of its release) added weight to the lyrics.

However, Coombes himself argued in an interview around October 1995, "it wasn't written as an anthem. It isn't supposed to be a rally cry for our generation. The stuff about 'We are young/We run green...' isn't about being 19, but really 13 or 14. and just discovering girls and drinking."

"It's meant to be light hearted and a bit of a laugh, not at all a rebellious call to arms." with Danny Goffey also saying: "It certainly wasn't written in a very summery vibe. It was written in a cottage where the heating had packed up, and we were trying to build fires to keep warm."

The second A-side "Time" is a slower, more blues-driven track, with the song even incorporating a harmonica solo. The B-side, "Condition", is a cover of "Just Dropped In (To See What Condition My Condition Was In)" by Mickey Newbury and originally a hit for Kenny Rogers. "Je Suis Votre Papa Sucre" (French for "I Am Your Sugar Daddy") is a short instrumental.

== Reception ==
"Alright" was the fifth single to be released from I Should Coco. While "Caught by the Fuzz", "Mansize Rooster", "Lose It", and "Lenny" all charted and were warmly received by the critics, it was "Alright/Time" – the final release from the album – which proved to be their breakthrough single, largely due to the popularity of the song "Alright". In his weekly UK chart commentary, James Masterton wrote, "If every band has their masterpiece in them, then this is surely the one for Supergrass." He added, "Sounding like a cross between the Small Faces and Duran Duran, "Alright" was a smash before it had even been released, one of those perfect pop records that makes you want to turn the radio up as loud as possible whenever you hear it." David Bennun from Melody Maker praised it as "that delicious, jaunty paean to innocent hedonism". The magazine's Paul Mathur said, "'Alright' sounds just like The Rutles' 'I Must Be in Love', enough already to give it semi-sanctified status. Then they go and throw in the most brilliantly dumb lyrics you could ever hope to hear." A reviewer from Music Week gave the song four out of five, commenting, "The irrepressible trio manage yet again to come up with a catchy summer single that could almost become an anthem for the younger generation. These boys can do no wrong." Roger Morton from NME named it "Single of the Week". Another NME editor, Steve Sutherland, wrote, "'Alright' is their '...Satisfaction', their 'My Generation', their 'Lazy Sunday'. From the instant it jumpstarts on pounding piano, it's a good-to-be-alive rollercoaster ride through making no big deal about sleeping around, rolling motors and generally living it up." Leesa Daniels rated it five out of five in the 5 July issue of Smash Hits, calling it "a lovely jaunty affair with plinky, plonky piano and guitars."

"Alright/Time" reached number two in the UK Singles Chart, making it Supergrass' highest-charting single to date along with "Richard III". It remained in the top three for one month. The song became a huge hit with school leavers within the United Kingdom that summer, leading to a huge demand for the track back in the United Kingdom. The double A-side also peaked at number 96 on the Australian ARIA Singles Chart in October 1995. "Alright" by itself peaked at number eight in Ireland and number 30 in France.

In 1999, in an interview, Coombes joked "We don't play 'Alright' anymore. We should play it in a minor key, and in the past tense."

== Music video ==
Danny, Gaz and Mick in a scene from the video to "Alright"

The success of the record was helped by a lively promotional video directed by Dom and Nic featuring the band joyfully messing around on bicycles and a wheeled bed at Portmeirion in North Wales and recreated elements of 1960s television series The Prisoner also filmed there.

Having seen the video, Steven Spielberg approached the band and proposed that they work together on a television series in the style of The Monkees. The group turned him down, preferring to work on their second album In It for the Money. Troy Carpenter, co-director of Nude as the News, claims "the gesture says a lot about the band's personality – one which has stuck with the group throughout its career – which is basically that of a fun-loving rock group whose undeniable musical talent is sometimes overshadowed by the sheer ebullience of its music."

== Track listings ==
- UK and Australian CD single
1. "Alright"
2. "Time"
3. "Condition"
4. "Je suis votre papa sucre"
- UK 7-inch and cassette single
1. "Alright"
2. "Time"
- European CD single
1. "Alright" – 3:00
2. "Condition" – 2:43
- European maxi-CD single
1. "Alright"
2. "Sex"
3. "Odd?"
4. "Wait for the Sun"
- Japanese CD single
1. "Alright"
2. "Condition"
3. "Je suis votre papa sucre"
4. "Lenny" (single edit)
5. "Wait for the Sun"
6. "Sex"
7. "Odd?" (live)
8. "She's So Loose" (live)
9. "Strange Ones" (live)
10. "Where Have All the Good Times Gone?" (live)
11. "Lose It" (live)

== Personnel ==
Personnel taken from Sound on Sound.

- Gaz Coombes – lead vocals, guitar, piano
- Mick Quinn – bass, backing vocals
- Danny Goffey – drums

== Charts ==
=== Weekly charts ===
Chart (1995–1996)	Peak position
Australia (ARIA)	96
Europe (Eurochart Hot 100)	11
Europe (European Hit Radio)	10
Finland (Suomen virallinen lista)	21
France (SNEP)	30
Iceland (Íslenski Listinn Topp 40)	6
Ireland (IRMA)	8
Israel (IBA)	38
Netherlands (Dutch Top 40 Tipparade)	12
Netherlands (Single Top 100 Tipparade)	8
Scottish Singles Sales (Official Charts)	2
UK Singles (Official Charts)	2
UK Airplay (Music Week)	2

=== Year-end charts ===
Chart (1995)	Position
Iceland (Íslenski Listinn Topp 40)	46
UK Singles (OCC)	49
UK Airplay (Music Week)	18

== Certifications ==
Region	Certification	Certified units/sales
Italy (FIMI)	Gold	50,000^{‡}
New Zealand (RMNZ)	Platinum	30,000^{‡}
Spain (Promusicae)	Gold	30,000^{‡}
United Kingdom (BPI)	2× Platinum	1,200,000^{‡}
^{‡} Sales+streaming figures based on certification alone.

== Release history ==
Region	Date	Format(s)	Label(s)	Ref.
United Kingdom	3 July 1995	CD; cassette	Parlophone	
United Kingdom	10 July 1995	7-inch vinyl	Parlophone	
Japan	30 August 1995	CD	EMI	
Australia	25 September 1995	CD	Parlophone	

== Covers and other versions ==
- In 2010, American rapper Travie McCoy sampled the song for his single "We'll Be Alright", from his debut solo album, Lazarus.
