= Dom and Nic =

British music director duo

dom&nic
- Occupation: Film makers
- Years active: 1994–present

dom&nic is the working name of directors Nic Goffey and Dominic Hawley. They have been directing music videos and commercials since 1994.

They have won numerous awards for their work, including the Gold Lion at the 1999 Cannes International Advertising Festival for their Nike What Are You Getting Ready For commercials and also won the MTV Best Video Award for The Chemical Brothers' "Believe".

== Music video ==
After meeting at School in Oxfordshire dom&nic began their directing career with a music video for "Mansize Rooster" by British band Supergrass (whose drummer Danny Goffey is Nic's younger brother). Parlophone's then video commissioner Dilly Gent introduced dom&nic to music video production company Oil Factory, initially for the purposes of producing this one off video. Following the video's success Oil Factory began representing dom&nic for music video work and it was here they met John Madsen their long term producer and third member of the team. They began making videos for a number of bands associated with the Brit Pop movement including The Bluetones, Sleeper and Lush. In July 1995 their video for Supergrass's Alright was released. Filmed in Portmeirion, Wales it was a tongue in cheek romp, mixing the band's British sense of humour with cult 1960s TV show influences such as The Monkees and The Prisoner. The video was parodied by Spitting Image, the satirical television comedy show, which placed Labour Party politicians Tony Blair, John Prescott and Margaret Beckett on Raleigh Chopper bikes with Prescot singing "shut my mouth...zip it tight...while e talks shite". The Alright video caught the attention of film director and producer Steven Spielberg who met with dom&nic and Supergrass to discuss making a pilot for a TV show with the band. Supergrass subsequently decided they wanted to concentrate on songwriting and declined to go ahead with the project. They continued to work with Supergrass making a total of 13 videos over the band's career, receiving a Brit Award nomination in 1998 for Best Music Video for "Late in the Day".

In 1996 they began another long standing working relationship with British electronic music duo The Chemical Brothers, making the video for "Setting Sun" the first single from their Dig Your Own Hole album. The track featured vocals from Noel Gallagher who was not available to appear in the video. Dom&nic's subsequent film was atypical of other dance music videos of the time. Taking the form of a narrative film which paid reverent attention to the music, it moved away from more abstract trends in the genre. The "Setting Sun" video "spies rave culture's flip from underground to overground through the eyes of a bewildered teenage girl" as it follows her nightmarish out of body experience at an all night free party. It mixes unsettling psychological confusion with moments of humorous imagery, for example the terrified girl sees break dancing policemen. Tom Rowlands and Ed Simons played a cameo role as themselves leaving the party with their record cases. The cameo has become a tradition which continues in many of the Chemical Brothers' videos to date. "Setting Sun" received a number of award nominations including the MTV Breakthrough Video Award. When MTV announced a format shift away from alternative rock to electronica they cited the "Setting Sun" video as an inspiration. Dom&nic continued the narrative format for The Chemical Brothers with follow up videos for "Block Rockin' Beats" (1997) (nominated for the Brit Awards Best Music Video and the MTV Awards Best Dance Video), "Hey Boy Hey Girl" (1999) and "The Test" featuring vocals from The Verve's Richard Ashcroft (2002). In 2006 their video for "Believe" (released 2005) a track featuring vocals by Bloc Party's Kele Okereke won Best Music Video in both MTV Europe's Awards and the CAD's Music video awards.

In 2007 they worked with Framestore again to create a cast of singing and dancing fish for the Chemical Brothers single "The Salmon Dance" featuring Vocals by Pharcyde rapper Fatlip. The Salmon Dance was nominated for MTV Europe's 2007 Video Star Award (which replaced the previous years' Best Video category). They have continued to work closely with the Chemical Brothers, creating videos for the songs "Midnight Madness", "Wide Open", "Free Yourself" and "Live Again".

The directors have also collaborated twice with UK Dance music act Faithless making videos for "We Come 1" (2001) and "Mass Destruction" (2004). Other music video work includes Oasis's "D'You Know What I Mean?" (1997) nominated for Brit Awards Best Group Video, Smashing Pumpkins' "Ava Adore" (1998) nominated for MVPA Best Video Award and winning the MTV Fashion Award and David Bowie's "I'm Afraid of Americans" featuring Trent Reznor which won the MVPA Best Alternative Video Award and was nominated for MTV's Best Male Video Award 1997. They have also worked with the reinstated Take That singer Robbie Williams for his cover version of World Party's song "She's the One". The video won the Brit Awards for Best British Video 2000.

== Advertising ==
In 1998 dom&nic directed their first television commercials, Rehab and Restaurant for the Wieden+Kennedy What Are You Getting Ready For campaign for Nike. The campaign won a Gold lion at Cannes in the 1999 International Advertising Festival. The films were produced through Oil Factory Inc where dom&nic were represented for US commercials. On returning to the UK the directors signed with Outsider Films for UK representation. They have since made commercials in both North America and Europe. In addition to their commercials work for large international clients they have also made films for a number of British charities including Barnardos, The Princes Trust and the housing charity Shelter.Their House of Cards film made for Shelter and advertising agency Leo Burnett was listed as the Joint Second most awarded commercial in the 2009 Gunn Report.

== Music videography ==
=== 1994 ===
- Supergrass - "Mansize Rooster"
- Supergrass - "Caught by the Fuzz"

=== 1995 ===
- Suggs - "The Tune"
- The Bluetones - "Bluetonic"
- Supergrass - "Time"
- Supergrass - "Alright"
- Supergrass - "Lenny"
- The Mystics - "Who's That Girl?"

=== 1996 ===
- The Chemical Brothers - "Setting Sun"
- The Bluetones - "Marblehead Johnson"
- Supergrass - "Going Out"
- The Mystics - "Lucy's Factory"

=== 1997 ===
- Supergrass - "Late in the Day"
- David Bowie & Trent Reznor - "I'm Afraid of Americans (V1)"
- Oasis - "D'You Know What I Mean?"
- Supergrass - "Cheapskate"
- The Chemical Brothers - "Block Rockin' Beats"
- Supergrass - "Sun Hits the Sky"
- Supergrass - "Richard III"
- Reef - "Come Back Brighter"

=== 1998 ===
- The Smashing Pumpkins - "Ava Adore"
- The Wallflowers - "Heroes"

=== 1999 ===
- Robbie Williams - "She's the One"
- The Chemical Brothers - "Hey Boy Hey Girl"
- Lodger - "Small Change"

=== 2000 ===
- David Bowie - "The Pretty Things Are Going to Hell"

=== 2001 ===
- Faithless - "We Come 1"

=== 2002 ===
- Supergrass - "Grace"
- The Chemical Brothers featuring Richard Ashcroft - "The Test"

=== 2003 ===
- Supergrass - "Rush Hour Soul"

=== 2004 ===
- Supergrass - "Kiss of Life"
- Supergrass - "Lose It"
- Faithless - "Mass Destruction"

=== 2005 ===
- The Chemical Brothers - "Believe"

=== 2007 ===
- The Chemical Brothers - "The Salmon Dance"

=== 2008 ===
- The Chemical Brothers - "Midnight Madness"

=== 2016 ===
- The Chemical Brothers featuring Beck - "Wide Open"

=== 2018 ===
- The Chemical Brothers - "Free Yourself"

=== 2023 ===
- The Chemical Brothers - "Live Again" featuring Halo Maud
