= Going Out =

1996 single by Supergrass

Single by Supergrass

from the album In It for the Money
- B-side: "Melanie Davis"; "Strange Ones" (live)
- Released: 26 February 1996
- Studio: Sawmills (Golant, UK)
- Length: 4:16
- Label: Parlophone
- Songwriters: Supergrass; Rob Coombes
- Producers: Supergrass; Sam Williams

Supergrass singles chronology
"Alright" / "Time" (1995)	"Going Out" (1996)	"Richard III" (1997)

Music video
- "Going Out" on YouTube

"Going Out" is the first single from English rock band Supergrass's second studio album, In It for the Money (1997). It was released on 26 February 1996 by Parlophone, more than a year before the album, and reached five on the UK Singles Chart and number 20 on the Irish Singles Chart.

== Background ==
"Going Out" was apparently originally written in the key of E because the engine of Supergrass' tour bus would tick at that same musical pitch. The song caused problems when Danny Goffey accused Gaz Coombes of basing the lyrics of the song on himself and Pearl Lowe's (his then girlfriend) involvement in the British tabloids.

== Critical reception ==
Gina Morris from Smash Hits gave the song four out of five, writing, "'Going Out' is a slow worker on the WOW! front (designed to sound like it's coming through a knackered transistor radio even on the best stereo) but it'll get you eventually."

== Music video ==
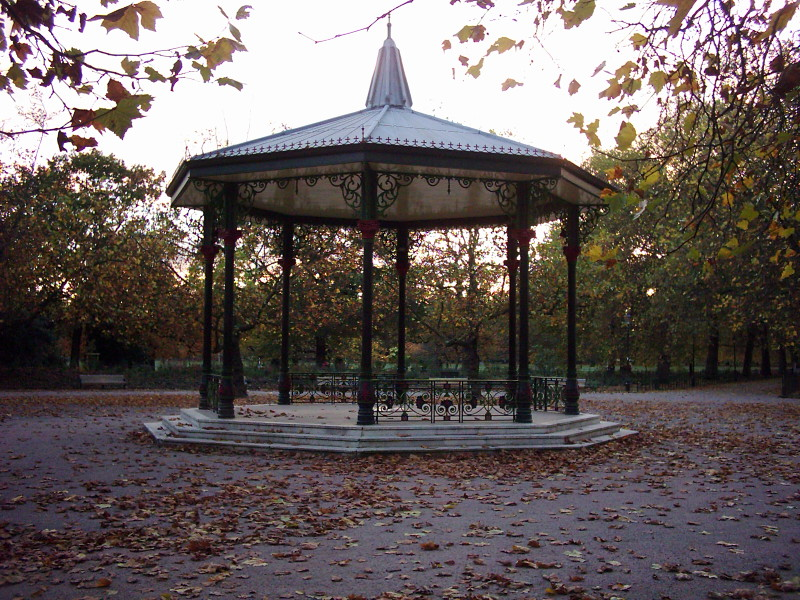
The bandstand in Battersea Park where "Going Out" and "Late in the Day" were filmed.

The music video for "Going Out", directed by Dom and Nic, was filmed on a bandstand in Battersea Park (the same bandstand is pictured in the video for "Late In The Day"), and features Supergrass in coats and scarves (due to the cold) playing the song in question. As the middle eight begins, the camera shows a framed photo of Gaz Coombes with Ronnie Biggs (the infamous train robber), which then pans out to Rob Coombes with a thermos flask at his side. Rob is also reading a newspaper entitled the "Evening Rooster", with the headline "SUPERGRASS EAT ROAST DINNERS" and a picture of the band underneath that; he looks over the edge of his newspaper sinisterly as the camera focuses on him.

The band are then seen watching themselves on the bandstand from varying levels of a tree, cradling Golden Retriever puppies in Dalmatian patterned blankets. They are then shown playing with a larger mongrel dog on the grass, and as the middle eight finally ends, the camera goes back to Supergrass performing on the bandstand, only now it is nighttime. The camera then moves to the roof of the bandstand and into the plain black of the night sky, and the end of the video is marked with the caption: "GOING OUT/SUPERGRASS".

== Track listings ==
- UK CD single
1. "Going Out"
2. "Melanie Davis"
3. "Strange Ones" (live)
- UK 7-inch and cassette single
1. "Going Out"
2. "Melanie Davis"
- Australian Tour EP
1. "Going Out"
2. "Lenny"
3. "She's So Loose" (live)
4. "Strange One" (live)

== Credits and personnel ==
Credits are taken from the In It for the Money album liner notes.

Studio

- Recorded at Sawmills Studio (Golant, UK)

Personnel

- Supergrass – writing, production, mixing
- Rob Coombes – writing
- The Kick Horns – horns
- Sam Williams – production, mixing

== Charts ==
Chart (1996)	Peak position
Europe (Eurochart Hot 100)	22
Ireland (IRMA)	20
Scottish Singles Sales (Official Charts)	6
UK Singles (Official Charts)	5
