= Mary (Supergrass song) =

1999 single by Supergrass

Single by Supergrass

from the album Supergrass
- B-side: "Mary (Live at Lamacq)"
- Released: 22 November 1999
- Studio: Sawmills, Ridge Farm
- Genre: Britpop; rock; pop
- Length: 4:02
- Label: Parlophone
- Songwriters: Supergrass; Rob Coombes
- Producers: Supergrass; John Cornfield

Supergrass singles chronology
"Moving" (1999)	"Mary" (1999)	"Never Done Nothing Like That Before" (2002)

Alternative cover
- CD 2 single cover

"Mary" is a song by the Britpop band Supergrass, released in November 1999 as the third and final single from their eponymous third album. It reached number 36 on the UK Singles Chart. This was the last Supergrass single to be released on cassette.

== Chord progression and lead guitar breaks ==
Mary is written in the key of Cm. The verses and chorus both employ the same chord progression of G♯-F-Cm, with guitarist Gaz Coombes utilising single string lead breaks on the 5th (A) string with an E-bow. The opening chord progression of the song bears some similarities to Carl Orff's Carmina Burana.

== Cover art ==
The single cover, shot by Nick Veasey, features a photo of a stone angel statue at night, whilst the cover of the CD2 release shows a similarly crafted stone statue of a man in daylight.

== Music video ==
Conceived as an homage to the Hammer Horror films from the 1950s, the accompanying music video features three moderately scary scenes, always corresponding to the song's "falsetto screaming" chorus: a room with books flying off the shelves and objects exploding because of poltergeist, a housewife vomiting blood in front of her family (including two children) and a girl drowning in a bathtub while blood spouts from the sink. The video was banned from television due to being "too frightening". An edited version was released, replacing the aforementioned scary scenes with pictures of onions.

== Track listing ==
CD1 CDRS6531 / TC TCR6531

1. "Mary" – 4:02
2. "Pumping on Your Stereo" (live at Peel Acres) – 3:12
3. "Strange Ones" (live at Peel Acres) – 3:57

CD2 CDR6531

1. "Mary" (live at Lamacq) – 4:12
2. "Richard III" (live at Peel Acres) – 3:29
3. "Sun Hits the Sky" (live at Peel Acres) – 4:44

Limited edition silver 7" R6531

1. "Mary" – 4:02
2. "Mary" (live at Lamacq) – 4:12

Japanese CD single TOCP-61033

1. "Mary" - 4:00
2. "Believer" - 3:46
3. "Sun Hits the Sky" (live from Peel Acres) - 4:44
4. "Pumping On Your Stereo" (live from Peel Acres) - 3:11
5. "Strange Ones" (live from Peel Acres) - 3:58
6. "Far Away" (acoustic) - 4:55
7. "You Too Can Play Alright" (spoken word instructions + instrumental excerpts) - 4:54

Booklet includes lyrics printed in Japanese, and a sheet of Supergrass decals.
