= Rush Hour Soul (song) =

Single by Supergrass

from the album Life on Other Planets
- B-side: "Everytime"
- Released: 4 August 2003
- Genre: Garage rock
- Length: 2:55
- Label: Parlophone
- Songwriter: Supergrass
- Producer: Tony Hoffer

Supergrass singles chronology
"Seen the Light" (2003)	"Rush Hour Soul" (2003)	"Kiss of Life" (2004)

"Rush Hour Soul" is a song by the Britpop band Supergrass. It was the fourth and final single from their fourth album Life on Other Planets. The single failed to chart in the US, and was outside the Top 75 in the UK upon its release in August 2003, but this was probably because it was released around ten months after Life on Other Planets.

"It's about losing reality and just being really off your head," said Danny Goffey. "You could be really drugged up or stricken by madness, and then it's about just needing an escape to get out of that. That's why the verses are quite intense and the chorus is more reflective about the place you'd rather be in."

Supergrass themselves are quite fond of the song, and describe it as "rapidly becoming a live monster".

== Music video ==
The video, directed by Dom and Nic, takes place at night and is filmed in London, near Piccadilly Circus. It consists mainly of Gaz Coombes dressed as a hobo, singing "Rush Hour Soul" angrily at pedestrians in the street, with the aide of a portable microphone and speaker, and running around the London Underground and dark streets and alleyways. During the choruses (and occasionally through the verses), the film reverts to the band (dressed normally) playing the song with rather stern expressions, in a room dimly lit with either coloured or white lights. In this room there are also scenes of the band just about to hit one another with their instruments before the film cuts out, and later on, 'clones' of Mick Quinn as he sings part of the song.

Just before the middle eight, the tramp (AKA Gaz) is beaten up in an alleyway by two men for almost walking into their car, and refusing to move out of the way. As the middle eight does begin, he looks to the night sky from where he is lying on the floor and sees a huge, slowly rotating comet, or asteroid, among the stars. The camera focuses on the comet and then zooms out once more to reveal that it is in fact "a comet drifting to the sun" as the song lyrics entail.

The video finishes with Supergrass playing "Rush Hour Soul" in the dimly lit room once more, then finally goes back to Gaz as the homeless person lying on the floor. One of the men from the car is about to launch a kick at him, but the film cuts off before he actually achieves physical contact.

== Track listing ==
CD CDR6612

1. "Rush Hour Soul" – 2:55
2. "Everytime" – 3:16
3. "Rush Hour Soul" (video)

Limited edition green 7" (with free sticker) R6612

1. "Rush Hour Soul" – 2:55
2. "Everytime" – 3:16
