= Kiss of Life (Supergrass song) =

Single by Supergrass

from the album Supergrass Is 10
- B-side: "We Dream of This"
- Released: 24 May 2004
- Studio: Sphere, Sawmills
- Length: 3:48
- Label: Parlophone
- Songwriters: Supergrass, Rob Coombes
- Producers: Supergrass, John Cornfield

Supergrass singles chronology
| "Rush Hour Soul" (2003) | "Kiss of Life" (2004) | "St. Petersburg" (2005) |

"Kiss of Life" is a song by English rock band Supergrass. It was released as a single from the compilation album Supergrass Is 10. It was a new song recorded for the compilation and was released on 24 May 2004, reaching number 23 on the UK Singles Chart. B-side "We Dream of This" was built around "Kiss of Life" played backwards. CD2 was an Enhanced CD with the video for "Kiss of Life" and "Rob's Guide to Responsible Flying", a small section of footage from the Supergrass Is 10 documentary (released with the DVD version of the compilation), showing keyboard player Rob Coombes smoking illegally in an aeroplane toilet.

Performed live the band play a notably different arrangement of the song, one example of which can be found as a B-side to the "St. Petersburg" single.

== Track listing ==
CD1 CDR6638 / Limited edition clear 7" R6638

1. "Kiss of Life" – 3:48
2. "We Dream of This" – 3:14

CD2 CDRS6638

1. "Kiss of Life" – 3:48
2. "We Dream of This" – 3:14
3. "Kiss of Life" (Tom Tom Club mix) – 6:20
4. "Kiss of Life" (video) – 3:45
5. "Rob's Guide to Responsible Flying" (video)
