= Here Come the Bombs =

Studio album by Gaz Coombes
- Released: 21 May 2012
- Genre: Indie rock
- Length: 37:57
- Label: Hot Fruit Recordings

Gaz Coombes chronology
Here Come the Bombs (2012)	Matador (2015)

Singles from Here Come the Bombs
- 1. "Sub Divider" Released: 15 February 2012; 2. "Hot Fruit" Released: 30 March 2012; 3. "Simulator" Released: 8 June 2012; 4. "White Noise" Released: 7 September 2012; 5. "Break the Silence" Released: 26 April 2013

Professional ratings
Review scores
Source	Rating
NME	4/5 stars

Here Come the Bombs is the debut solo album of Supergrass front man Gaz Coombes, who performed all of the instruments on the album. It was released on 21 May 2012 by record label Hot Fruit Recordings. It charted at #54 on the UK Albums Chart.

== Track listing ==
All songs written by Gaz Coombes except tracks 2, 3, 6, 9 & 11; written by Gaz Coombes & Sam Williams.

No.	Title	Length
1.	"Bombs"	2:32
2.	"Hot Fruit"	4:06
3.	"Whore"	2:48
4.	"Sub Divider"	3:27
5.	"Universal Cinema"	6:08
6.	"Simulator"	3:06
7.	"White Noise"	4:08
8.	"Fanfare"	3:33
9.	"Break the Silence"	3:55
10.	"Daydream on a Street Corner"	1:17
11.	"Sleeping Giant"	3:05
Total length:		37:57
