= The Hotrats =

English cover band

- Origin: Oxford, England
- Genres: Alternative rock; post-punk revival
- Years active: 2009–2011
- Labels: G&D Records; Fat Possum; Hostess Entertainment
- Members: Gaz Coombes; Danny Goffey
- Website: Official website

The Hotrats (originally the Diamond Hoo Ha Men) were a cover band formed by Gaz Coombes and Danny Goffey as a side-project from their main band Supergrass. The band were named after Frank Zappa's album Hot Rats. The duo recorded a set of covers with producer Nigel Godrich for an album named Turn Ons which was released in early 2010. They performed a short UK tour, which included performances at the Reading and Leeds Festivals.

After Supergrass announced their disbandment, The Hotrats joined Air for performances of The Virgin Suicides live for the first time, over several dates, including an appearance at the Théâtre de la Passerelle in Saint-Brieuc as part of Festival Art Rock 2010.

They also recorded a cover of "Under My Thumb" for the Scott Pilgrim vs. the World movie, which remains unreleased.

== Discography ==
=== Studio albums ===
Year	Album details	Peak chart positions
Year	Album details	Heatseekers
2010	Turn Ons: Release: 25 January 2010; Label: G&D Records; Format: CD, LP, DI	40

=== Singles ===
Year	Single	Album
2009	"Drive My Car"	
2009	"Damaged Goods/(You Gotta) Fight for Your Right (To Party!)"	Turn Ons
2010	"Pump It Up"	Turn Ons
