= St Sampson, Cornwall =

Civil parish in mid-Cornwall, England

Coordinates: 50.374°N 4.662°W

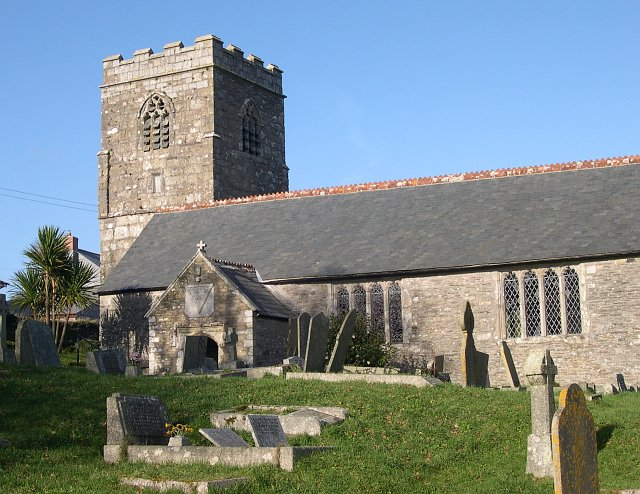
Saint Sampson's Church, Golant

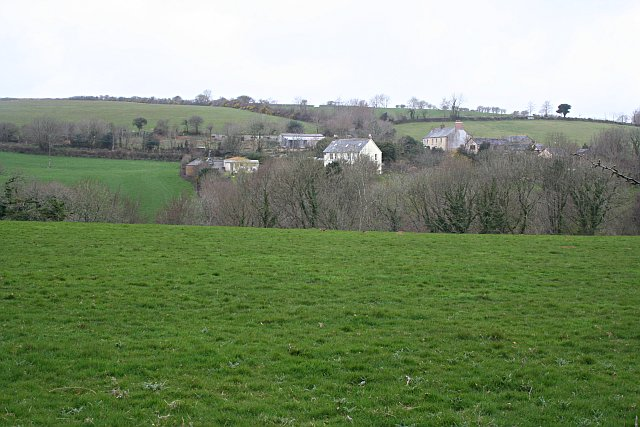
Penquite

St Sampson is a civil parish in mid-Cornwall, England, United Kingdom. The population at the 2011 census was 260.

Formally known as the parish of Golant (Golant is a small village on the west bank of the Fowey river) the parish is bounded on the north by Lanlivery, on the east by the river Fowey which separates it from St Winnow, St Veep and Lanteglos-by-Fowey, on the south by Fowey, and on the west by Tywardreath.

The small church has a holy well by the south porch and is dedicated to St Sampson, by whose name the parish is usually known. The church was probably all built at the same time and was dedicated in 1509. There is a low western tower. Features of interest include bench ends made into a pulpit and a sculpture of the head of Christ (perhaps Italian).

Penquite House near Golant was designed by George Wightwick. It has two storeys and five bays.
