= Charly Coombes =

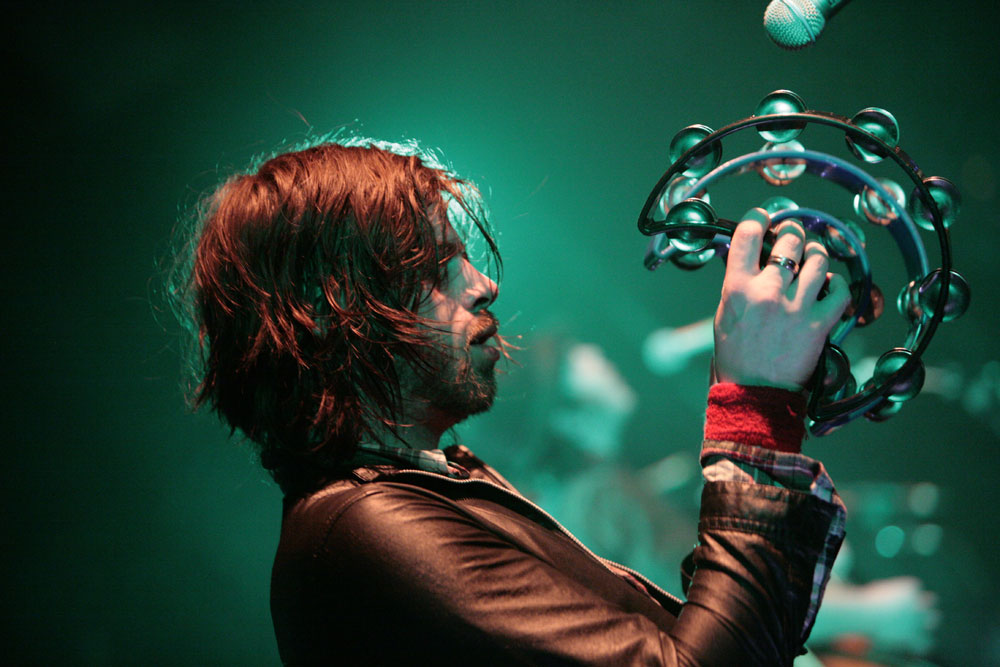
- Charly Coombes performing with Supergrass in London, 2008.

Background information
- Born: John Charles Coombes; 27 December 1980 (age 45); Mountain View, California, United States
- Genres: Alternative, Rock, Pop
- Occupations: Songwriter, Producer, Musician
- Instruments: Keyboards, Vocals, Guitar, Bass guitar, Percussion
- Years active: 2003–present
- Labels: Finyl Vinyl, Turquoise Records, Sandman Records, Heavenly Records, Astralwerks, 27 Records

Charly Coombes (born 27 December 1980) is British singer-songwriter, musician and producer based in São Paulo, Brazil.

== Career ==
In 2003 Charly joined Sleaford blues rock band 22-20s, who had recently re-located to Oxford, as keyboard player. The band released one self-titled album, toured Europe, USA and Japan, as well as supporting Oasis during their 2005 tour before splitting up in 2006 (the band reformed between 2008 and 2013 with a different line-up). Following the split of 22-20s, Coombes began playing with the Brit pop band Supergrass, filling in for brother and keyboard player Rob Coombes during the Supergrass Road to Rouen European and North American tours 2005/2006 and substituted for three gigs during bassist Mick Quinn's injury in September 2007. He then joined the band on the road full time until their split in 2011. In 2009, Coombes began to write and release solo material Charly Coombes and The New Breed, who released three EPs.

Coombes also directed and starred in the rockumentary Glange Fever released in August 2008 under the pseudonym Chas Harrison. The film follows the Diamond Hoo Ha Men, Duke Diamond and Randy Hoo Ha as they tour the country. In December 2008 he also put together a short film, only available on YouTube, about life behind the curtain on the Supergrass American Tour during July 2008.

In September 2013 his debut solo album "No Shelter" was released on Finyl Vinyl Records. Coombes then released 3 more albums under Finyl Vinyl: Black Moon (2015), Run (2018) and All In the End is Harvest (2020).

In 2018 Coombes began writing and producing for TV and film, providing soundtracks for brands such as Ford, Samsung, Honda and Nike.

In 2022 Coombes released the EP Lifebox following the birth of his son, and most recently, his fifth studio album Tia Fumante (2025).

A special 10 year anniversary version of Black Moon (2015) is set for release in April 2026 with Finyl Vinyl

== Personal life ==
Coombes was born in Mountain View, CA but grew up in the English Oxfordshire village of Wheatley. He is the youngest sibling of Supergrass members Gaz and Rob, who are both born in Oxford.

In March 2009 Charly married Rayana Macedo in Brazil. They currently reside in São Paulo, Brazil and have a son.

== The New Breed ==
In July 2009, Charly Coombes formed Charly Coombes & The New Breed, consisting of Coombes (lead vocals and keyboards), Jacob Roos (bass guitar and backing vocals), Dave Ashworth (guitars and backing vocals) and Reynaldo Migliavacca (drums). The band spent two months rehearsing Coombes' entire back catalogue and played their first gig at The Bullingdon Arms, Oxford on 25 September 2009.

The band played throughout the United Kingdom, United States and Brazil as well as in support slots for The Hotrats, Supergrass and Taylor Hawkins and the Coattail Riders. On 1 February 2010, the band released their debut EP entitled Panic. A second EP entitled Waves was released on 29 November 2010.

The band released their third EP, Noise Control in November 2011 in Brazil, and in England in Spring 2012.

== Discography ==
Albums

- 22-20s (as part of 22-20s) (September 2004) No. 40 UK
- 22-20s Live in Japan (Live) (as part of 22-20s) (2005)
- No Shelter (Debut solo album) (September 2013)
- Black Moon (solo album) (2015)
- Run (solo album) (2017)
- All In The End Is Harvest (solo album) (2022)
- Tia Fumante (solo album) (2025)

EPs

- Stolen (as part of Four Way Trauma) Sandman Records (April 2001)
- 05/03 (Live) (as part of 22-20s) (September 2003)
- When The Night Comes (as a session player for Lazare) (April 2009)
- Panic (Charly Coombes & The New Breed) (Feb 2010)
- Waves (Charly Coombes & The New Breed) (Nov 2010)
- Noise Control (Charly Coombes & The New Breed) (March 2012)
- Life box (2022)

Singles

- "Third Degree Burns" (as part of Tumbleweed) Turquoise Records (August 1998)
- "Such A Fool" / "Baby, You're Not in Love" (as part of 22-20s) (April 2003)
- "Why Don't You Do It For Me?" (as part of 22-20s) (April 2004) No. 41 UK
- "Shoot Your Gun" (as part of 22-20s) (June 2004) No. 30 UK
- "22 Days" (as part of 22-20s) (September 2004) No. 34 UK
- "Such A Fool" (as part of 22-20s) (January 2005) No. 29 UK

Compilations

- Sport (as part of Tumbleweed) Appears on Ten Trucking Greats – Truck Fest 98 (September 1998)
- Close To Love (as part of Four Way Trauma) Appears on Ten More Trucking Greats – Truck Fest 99 (August 1998)
- Boy (as part of Four Way Trauma) Appears on LSCD – Local Sound CD (March 2000)
- Such A Fool (as part of 22-20s) Appears on The Album (August 2005)

Coombes features on German dance/electronic DJ Ronski Speed's debut album, Pure Devotion; he appeared on the track "Out of Order".

== See also ==
- Supergrass
- 22-20s
