= Matador (Gaz Coombes album) =

Studio album by Gaz Coombes
- Released: 26 January 2015
- Recorded: Courtyard Studios, Oxfordshire
- Genres: Indie rock, indie pop
- Length: 39:58
- Label: Hot Fruit Recordings/Caroline International
- Producer: Gaz Coombes

Gaz Coombes chronology
Here Come the Bombs (2012)	Matador (2015)	World's Strongest Man (2018)

Singles from Matador
- 1. "Buffalo" Released: 28 October 2013; 2. "20/20" Released: 4 December 2014; 3. "Detroit" Released: 16 February 2015; 4. "The Girl Who Fell to Earth" Released: 4 May 2015; 5. "Matador (Da Capo)" Released: 18 September 2015

Matador is the second solo album by English musician Gaz Coombes. Recorded at Coombes' home studio and Courtyard Studios in Oxfordshire, it was released on 26 January 2015 on his record label Hot Fruit Recordings via Caroline International. Coombes himself produced the album and it features appearances by Ride drummer Loz Colbert, Charly Coombes, and guitarist Nick Fowler. The album charted #18 on the UK Albums Chart. It was nominated for the 2015 Mercury Music Prize.

== Critical reception ==
Professional ratings
Review scores
Source	Rating
AllMusic	4/5 stars
musicOMH	4.5/5 stars
Mojo	5/5 stars
Q	4/5 stars
Clash	7/10 stars
The Guardian	4/5 stars
Pitchfork Media	6.3/10

Matador has received critical acclaim from music critics. musicOMH's Ben Hogwood called the music and the songs "a step forward" and said the album reveals Coombes' "darker, more experimental side". Mojo's Pat Gilbert called its atmosphere "dreamy, hypnagogic" and gave the album a full 5 star rating. Pitchfork's review praised some of the songs but was more critical, stating that in this album Coombes "plays it safe" and that he "comes at these songs with a less-is-more attitude, but even the simplest fare fails to connect".

== Track listing ==
No.	Title	Length
1.	"Buffalo"	3:21
2.	"20/20"	4:15
3.	"The English Ruse"	4:43
4.	"The Girl Who Fell to Earth"	3:35
5.	"Detroit"	5:41
6.	"Needle's Eye"	4:04
7.	"Seven Walls"	3:49
8.	"Oscillate"	3:12
9.	"To the Wire"	4:06
10.	"Is It On?"	0:34
11.	"Matador"	1:25
Total length:		39:58
