= In It for the Money =

Studio album by Supergrass
- Released: 21 April 1997
- Recorded: Autumn 1996
- Studio: Sawmills in Cornwall
- Genre: Britpop; power pop
- Length: 43:03
- Label: Parlophone (UK); Capitol (US); Echo/BMG (2018 reissue)
- Producer: Supergrass; John Cornfield; Sam Williams

Supergrass chronology
| I Should Coco (1995) | In It for the Money (1997) | Supergrass (1999) |

Singles from In It for the Money
- 1. "Going Out" Released: 26 February 1996; 2. "Richard III" Released: 31 March 1997; 3. "Sun Hits the Sky" Released: 9 June 1997; 4. "Cheapskate" Released: 21 June 1997; 5. "Late in the Day" Released: 6 October 1997

Alternative cover
- Japanese edition cover

In It for the Money is the second studio album by English alternative rock band Supergrass, released in 1997. NME called it "more fun than watching a wombat in a washing machine" and named it the 10th best album of the year. In 1998, Q readers voted it the 68th greatest album of all time, while in 2000 the same magazine placed it at number 57 in its list of the 100 Greatest British Albums Ever.

== Recording and conception ==
Only two songs were written before entering Sawmills Studio, so most of the tracks were penned during recording itself.

Recording was often disrupted by the drummer Danny Goffey going back to London unplanned to record with his and Pearl Lowe's band Lodger. He was told by management that this was unacceptable behaviour. This, along with Gaz Coombes and Goffey's bickering in the music press about the underlying meaning of lyrics to "Going Out", put strain on the recording process.

It is speculated that Parlophone, the record label Supergrass were on, offered the band a sum of money to decide on a final name for the album, because they were taking too long to deliberate. However, the band themselves claim that they never received any of this money in return. Other suggestions considered for the title of the album included Hold on to the Handrail and Children of the Monkey Basket (which is now the name of the band's self-run website).

"Richard III" and "Sun Hits the Sky" appear to end with snippets of other, unreleased songs, that play until fade out.

The guitar solo in "Sometimes I Make You Sad" was written during the recording of In It for the Money; it was recorded at half speed then sped up to achieve the mandolin-like sound. The only use of percussion in the song is a cymbal, the drum noises were instead simulated by members of the band making 'grunting' noises. These were then put on a loop.

== Album artwork ==
The album cover is a photograph of the band busking during the filming of the video for their single "Cheapskate". The Japanese edition has, instead, an oil painting by Maff Burley, an old school friend of Danny Goffey. In it, the band is curled up in a circular window at the Old Sawmills at Fowey.

== Reception ==
Professional ratings
Review scores
| Source | Rating |
|---|---|
| AllMusic | 4.5/5 stars |
| Chicago Tribune | 3/4 stars |
| Entertainment Weekly | B+ |
| The Guardian | 4/5 stars |
| NME | 8/10 |
| Pitchfork | 8.9/10 |
| Q | 5/5 stars |
| Rolling Stone | 3.5/5 stars |
| Select | 4/5 |
| Spin | 7/10 |

The album was critically acclaimed, and peaked at No. 2 in the UK Albums Chart, and sold 300,000 copies in the UK and over one million worldwide. "The fact that it has sold more worldwide than I Should Coco," said Gaz Coombes, "means we can sleep at night."

"In It for the Money is my favourite album of the year…" declared The Prodigy's Liam Howlett at the close of 1997. "It's quality music. 'Richard III' is a top punk tune – that's why I bought the album."

The album is included in the book 1001 Albums You Must Hear Before You Die.

== Track listing ==
All tracks written by Supergrass/Rob Coombes.

CD & limited edition CD (with bonus CD) CDPCS7388 / TC TCPCS7388 / 12" PCS7388

1. "In It for the Money" – 3:05
2. "Richard III" – 3:13
3. "Tonight" – 3:09
4. "Late in the Day" – 4:43
5. "G-Song" – 3:27
6. "Sun Hits the Sky" – 4:55
7. "Going Out" – 4:16
8. "It's Not Me" – 2:56
9. "Cheapskate" – 2:43
10. "You Can See Me" – 3:40
11. "Hollow Little Reign" – 4:08
12. "Sometimes I Make You Sad" – 2:48

Limited edition bonus CD

1. "Caught by the Fuzz" (acoustic) – 3:06
2. "Sitting Up Straight" (alternative mix) – 2:22
3. "Melanie Davis" – 2:46
4. "Odd?" – 4:14 Members of the band can be heard blowing bubbles into a bucket during the outro of this song.
5. "Wait for the Sun" – 4:11
6. "Nothing More's Gonna Get in My Way" – 4:05
7. "Sex!" – 2:38
8. "20ft Halo" – 3:21
9. "Je Suis Votre Papa Sucre" – 1:45

== Personnel ==
Personnel adapted from In It for the Money CD booklet.

Supergrass

- Gaz Coombes
- Danny Goffey
- Mick Quinn

Additional musicians

- Rob Coombes
- The Kick Horns – horns (1 & 7)
- Hornography – horns (3 & 11)
- Satin Singh – percussion (6 & 12)
- Sam Williams – theremin (2)

Production

- Supergrass – production, mixing
- John Cornfield – production (all except 7), mixing (1–3, 5, 6, 8, 10–12)
- Sam Williams – production (7), mixing (4, 7, 9)

Artwork

- James Fry – cover photography
- Matthew Burley – inner photography
- Nick & Dom – video stills
- The Designers Republic – design & image manipulation

== Charts ==
=== Weekly charts ===
1997 chart performance for In It for the Money
| Chart (1997) | Peak position |
|---|---|
| Australian Albums (ARIA) | 28 |
| Dutch Albums (Album Top 100) | 68 |
| European Albums Chart | 11 |
| Finnish Albums (Suomen virallinen lista) | 37 |
| French Albums (SNEP) | 36 |
| German Albums (Offizielle Top 100) | 85 |
| Icelandic Albums (Tonlist) | 5 |
| Irish Albums (IRMA) | 9 |
| New Zealand Albums (RMNZ) | 7 |
| Norwegian Albums (VG-lista) | 23 |
| Swedish Albums (Sverigetopplistan) | 27 |
| UK Albums (OCC) | 2 |
| US Heatseekers Albums (Billboard) | 23 |

2021 chart performance for In It for the Money
| Chart (2021) | Peak position |
|---|---|
| Belgian Albums (Ultratop Wallonia) | 79 |

=== Year-end charts ===
1997 year-end chart performance for In It for the Money
| Chart (1997) | Position |
|---|---|
| New Zealand Albums (RMNZ) | 32 |
| UK Albums (OCC) | 56 |
