= Supergrass =

English rock band

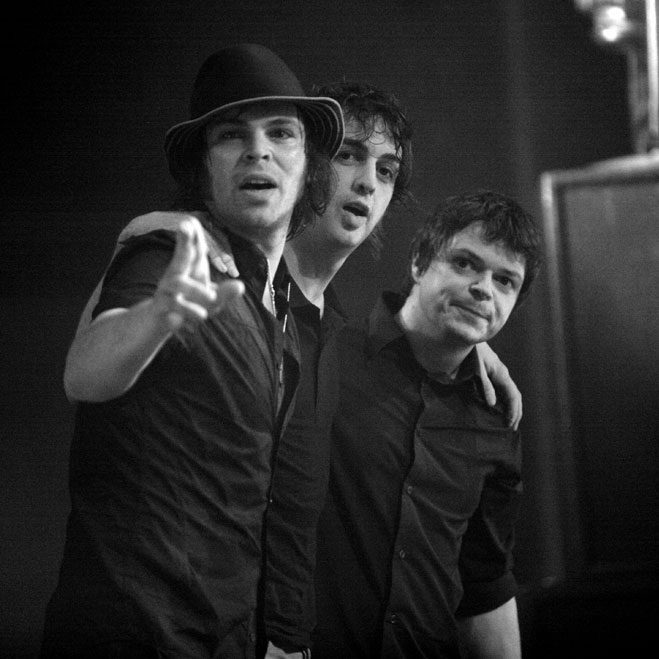
- From left to right: Gaz Coombes, Danny Goffey and Mick Quinn at the Roundhouse, London, 14 March 2008

Background information
- Origin: Oxford, England
- Genres: Britpop; alternative rock
- Years active: 1993–2010, 2019–present
- Labels: Parlophone; Sub Pop; Backbeat; Island Def Jam; Capitol; Supergrass; Cooking Vinyl; The Echo Label
- Members: Gaz Coombes; Danny Goffey; Mick Quinn; Rob Coombes
- Website: supergrass.com

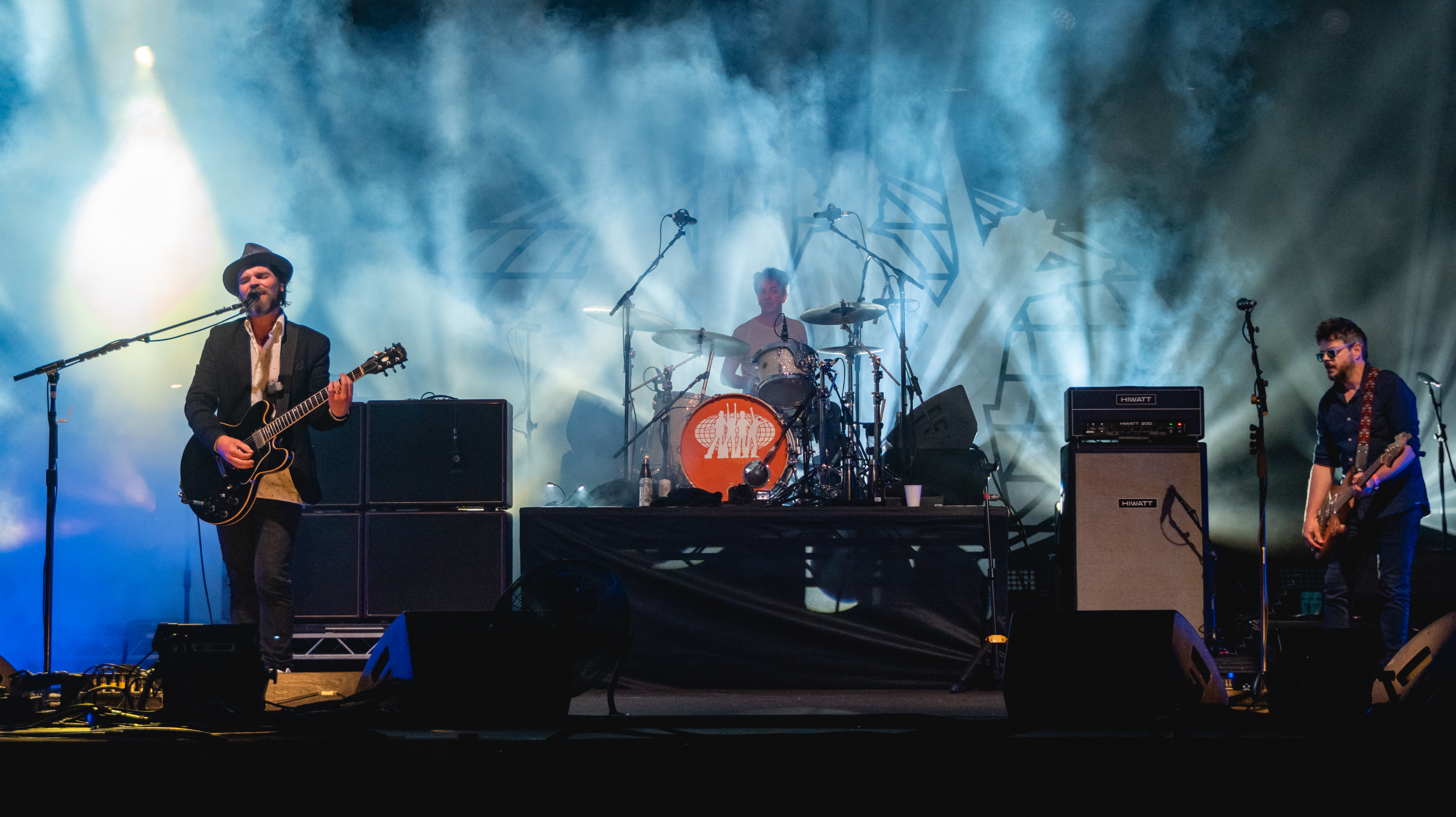
Supergrass onstage at the Crystal Palace Bowl, August 2021

Supergrass are an English rock band formed in 1993. For the majority of the band's tenure, the line-up has consisted of brothers Gaz (lead vocals, guitar) and Rob Coombes (keyboards), Mick Quinn (bass, backing vocals), and Danny Goffey (drums, backing vocals). It was originally a three-piece, before Rob Coombes officially joined in 2002.

The band signed to Parlophone Records in 1994 and produced I Should Coco (1995), the label's best-selling debut album since the Beatles' Please Please Me. Their first album's fourth single, "Alright", was an international hit. The band went on to release five more albums: In It for the Money (1997), Supergrass (1999), Life on Other Planets (2002), Road to Rouen (2005) and Diamond Hoo Ha (2008), as well as a compilation called Supergrass Is 10 (2004). In August 2009, the band signed to Cooking Vinyl and began work on their seventh studio album, Release the Drones. The album remains unreleased and unfinished.

In April 2010, the band announced they were splitting up due to musical and creative differences. The group disbanded after four farewell shows, the final one at La Cigale, Paris, on 11 June 2010. The band reformed in 2019, initially to perform at Pilton Party followed by a "secret" show at Oslo in Hackney, London. The band made their final appearance of their first reunion with a performance in honour of Foo Fighters' recently deceased drummer Taylor Hawkins at his tribute concert in 2022, performing some of Hawkins' favourite songs from Supergrass's catalogue. Hawkins had previously expressed his love of the band, and had even made a cameo drum appearance at one of their concerts. The band announced a 2025 UK tour at the end of 2024 playing I Should Coco (for its 30th anniversary) in its entirety plus hits.

== History ==
=== The Jennifers and formation (1990–1993) ===
The Jennifers
- Origin: Oxford, England
- Genres: Alternative rock Britpop
- Years active: 1990–1993
- Label: Nude
- Past members: Gaz Coombes; Danny Goffey; Nic Goffey; Andy Davies; Dan Fox

At the age of 16 and 18 respectively and whilst attending Wheatley Park School just outside Oxford, Gaz Coombes and Danny Goffey were playing in the Jennifers along with Nick Goffey and Andy Davies. Danny and Nick Goffey are the sons of former BBC Top Gear presenter and motoring journalist Chris Goffey.

The Jennifers began building a reputation in the Oxford indie music scene, influenced by Ride, the Charlatans, Inspiral Carpets, the Kinks, the Who, and including traits of the shoegaze era. The band played gigs at various venues around Oxfordshire, often public houses and clubs, including the Jericho Tavern in Oxford.

They sold a demo tape recorded and produced by Nick Langston at Stargoat Studios near Banbury. The demo featured three songs: "Flying", which featured a 20-second countdown at the beginning, the recording of a rocket launch and then a fast guitar-based section which appeared to be influenced by the Stone Roses; "Inside of Me", mostly similar in style but with a slower, funk-inflected jam at the end; and a guitar-based ballad simply titled "(Slow Song)" on the tape. The band enjoyed enough success to release one single in 1992, "Just Got Back Today", on Nude Records, which is now a highly sought-after rarity. Second single, "Tightrope" was never released due to disagreements with Nude Records (but does appear on the compilation CD Days Spent Dreaming), the band split up soon after this in the fall of 1992. Andy Davies went off to university and Nic Goffey went on to form a directing partnership with friend Dom Hawley, later directing many videos for Supergrass.

When Coombes began working at the local Harvester, he befriended co-worker Mick Quinn. The two realised they had common music interests and Coombes invited Quinn to come and jam with him and Goffey. In February 1993 they formed a band named Theodore Supergrass "for about two months," according to Quinn, who explained, "[T]hen we realized that Theodore was a bit rubbish so we took that off."

Goffey claims that the name was his idea and says, "Although the others will dispute it, it was me. We were Theodore Supergrass and the idea was the band would be a little black character, and we wouldn't ever have to do interviews. We'd get the questions in advance, script the answers and then animate Theodore Supergrass answering them. But it cost too much money."

Gaz's brother, Rob Coombes, played flute for the band's début gig at the Co-Op Hall, Oxford in 1993. In January 1995 he first performed as keyboardist with the band for a live Radio 1 John Peel session. His role in the band progressed over the years, post–I Should Coco material is credited to "Supergrass and Rob Coombes", however, he was not introduced as a band member until almost a decade later.

=== Britpop years and stardom (1994–1998) ===
Supergrass "Alright" (1995)
24-second sample from Supergrass' "Alright".

In mid-1994, Supergrass issued their debut single "Caught by the Fuzz" on the small independent local label Backbeat Records. The song recounts lead singer and guitarist Gaz Coombes's experience of being arrested by the police for possession of cannabis. The limited release of vinyl copies sold out quickly, thanks in part to support from John Peel on his Radio One show. The Parlophone label signed the band and re-released the single in the autumn of the same year. It achieved the rare feat of being both NME and Melody Maker's "Single of the Week" status in the same week.

"Mansize Rooster", released in February 1995, peaked at number 20 in the UK Singles Chart and "Lenny" was the band's first top 10 single. "Lenny" was followed soon afterwards by the band's debut album, I Should Coco (May 1995), which entered the UK Albums Chart at number one. It achieved half a million sales in the UK and over a million worldwide. NME reviewer Steve Sutherland gave the album a nine out of ten rating, writing, "These freaks shall inherit the earth." The album's fourth single, the double A-side release "Alright"/"Time", stayed in the UK Top Three for a month, peaking at number two.

Supergrass followed I Should Coco with 18 months of heavy touring, appearing at festivals such as Scotland's T in the Park and the Glastonbury Festival. After Performing at Rio's Hollywood Rock Festival in April 1996, Supergrass met the train robber Ronnie Biggs, and he apparently said to them, "I was frightened for my life when I heard there was a supergrass in the area." A photograph of Ronnie Biggs and Gaz together was subsequently included in the music video for their 1996 single "Going Out". Recorded at Great Linford Manor the single peaked at number five in the UK chart, but was the last song produced by Sam Williams. Supergrass returned to Sawmills Studio to co-produce follow up album, In It for the Money (released April 1997), with John Cornfield. The album was a huge success and went platinum in the UK, but confused some fans expecting something similar to I Should Coco. The single, "Richard III", reached number two. Subsequent releases, "Sun Hits the Sky" and "Late in the Day", reached numbers 10 and 18 respectively.

Around this time Supergrass also appeared on the front cover of The Big Issue, interviewed for the magazine at Heathrow Airport by ex-drug smuggler Howard Marks.

=== Further musical growth (1999–2004) ===
The band again took a short break before returning in 1999 with the single "Pumping on Your Stereo". The promo video, produced in conjunction with the Jim Henson's Creature Shop, featured the band with comical "muppet" bodies. The single generated welcome publicity following their time out of the limelight, as did a small sold-out tour scheduled around the single release, the final night of which was at Shepherd's Bush Empire as part of MTV's "Five Night Stand" festival. The single and the tour were followed by their third LP Supergrass (1999). The following spring the record was released in the US Once more, the album was recorded at Sawmills Studio with longtime associate Cornfield producing. Supergrass was well received critically and commercially and it has since gone platinum in the UK, but did not reap the same level of success as its predecessors. Critics claimed the album was "hit and miss", which showed up particularly as the "also-rans are surrounded by songs that are as great as anything Supergrass has ever recorded". Their next single, "Moving", proved popular and reached the Top Ten in the UK. And their third single, "Mary" entered the Top 40. There followed a long hiatus.

After three years out of the limelight, the band returned with Life on Other Planets (September 2002), recorded at Heliocentric, Rockfield and Mayfair Studios and produced by Beck collaborator Tony Hoffer. The album was released in the UK on Parlophone, but in the US on the Island Def Jam imprint. The record was not as commercially successful as Supergrass's first three albums, failing to make the Top Three in the UK albums chart. However, the critical response to the album was generally very positive, with Stephen Thomas Erlewine from AllMusic claiming "The world is a better place for having Supergrass in it." It has since gone gold in the UK. Life on Other Planets was also notable as it was the first Supergrass album to recognise Rob Coombes as an official member. For the band's first three albums, Supergrass officially consisted of Gaz Coombes, Goffey and Quinn although Rob Coombes contributed to many of the band's songs and videos, and toured with them. Tracks recorded before this were often credited to "Supergrass and Rob Coombes". The band followed Life on Other Planets with another extended three-year hiatus, devoted to touring and personal engagements.

In June 2004 the band's record company suggested the band release a singles compilation Supergrass Is 10, spawning two new self-produced tracks: "Kiss of Life" and "Bullet". The companion DVD contained "Home Movie", a humorous documentary charting the band's first 10 years' achievements, made in collaboration with "Seen the Light" video director Simon Hilton. The record entered the UK albums chart at number four and has since gone gold in the UK.

=== Development (2005–2008) ===
Recording of their fifth studio album, Road to Rouen, began in France in a studio built by the band in Normandy. Working with French engineer Pierre-Olivier Marger, the sessions represented a significant change in direction and were perceived as a more mature body of work.

"St. Petersburg", the string-laden first single, was released on 8 August 2005. The album followed a week later (released 27 September in North America) and reached No. 9 on the UK chart, going on to achieve silver status in the UK. Opinion at the time was divided, but the album garnered the band many new fans and a measure of creative respect, some even embracing it as "the sound of a band at last hitting their stride".

The second single, "Low C", featured a video by "Pumping on Your Stereo" video director Garth Jennings, shot in Weeki Wachee Springs Florida. The third single, "Fin", interpreted as a missive to the Coombes brothers' recently deceased mother, received much critical praise, The Guardian referring to it as "so gorgeously light and airy that listening to it is like sleepwalking in space".

The band toured the songs in both acoustic and electric formats with percussionist Satin Singh joining the live band throughout. From August 2005 to September 2006 they performed in Japan, South America, the United States, and Europe, finishing with a memorable gig at the Beijing Pop Festival.

The follow-up album, Diamond Hoo Ha was recorded at Hansa Tonstudio, Berlin, with producer Nick Launay, and mixed at Seedy Underbelly Studios in Los Angeles. The band toured in the summer of 2007, headlining Guilfest, among others, and debuting new material, with the youngest sibling of the Coombes brothers, ex-22-20s keyboardist Charly, on second guitar, percussion and backing vocals.

On 27 September 2007, bassist Mick Quinn sustained a broken heel bone and two spinal fractures in a sleepwalking accident whilst on holiday in France (Quinn sleepwalked out of a first floor window of the villa he was staying at in the South of France.). During his recuperation, Gaz and Danny promoted first single "Diamond Hoo Ha Man" as the Diamond Hoo Ha Men, with a run of small club shows in December and January. To celebrate the single release, Mick Quinn appeared as Diamond Hoo Ha Man "Biff Hymenn" at the Apple Store, Regent Street, London, marking his return to touring duties on 15 January. Charly directed Glange Fever (under pseudonym "Chas Harrison") a rockumentary which followed their exploits.

For a handful of "full band" Supergrass dates on the Diamond Hoo Ha tour (as opposed to Gaz & Danny as the Diamond Hoo Ha Men duo), Charly Coombes filled in for Mick Quinn on bass while he recovered from his injuries. When Mick recovered & returned to the band, Charly remained with them on second guitar & percussion (as per his work on the record) for the rest of the tour.

In February 2008, the video of their second single "Bad Blood" was released on the band's official web-site, winning Best Rock Video at the UK Music Video Awards, and the single followed on 17 March.

In 2008, Parlophone was taken over by venture capitalist group, Terra Firma, and Supergrass ended their contract with the label. "Rebel In You", final single from the Diamond Hoo Ha album, was released, under licence from Parlophone, on the band's own imprint, Supergrass Records.

=== Independent career and split (2009–2010) ===
The band headlined Wychwood Festival on 30 May and also Sellindge Music Festival (6 June), Provinssirock Festival (13 June) and a short European trek in July at BBK Live (10 July) at Bilbao, Bikini Festival (11 July) in Toulouse, Festival Les Ardentes (12 July) in Liège (Belgium) and Paredes de Coura Festival (30 July) in Portugal. There was also a co-headlining date at 2009's Truck Festival along with Ash, on 25–26 July at Hill Farm in Steventon, Oxfordshire.

On 12 April 2010, the band announced they were to split up after a series of four farewell shows, with their final gig in Paris on 11 June 2010.

At the time of the split, Supergrass were working on their seventh studio album, tentatively titled Release the Drones. In early 2010, the band revealed that the album had been influenced by krautrock bands such as Can, and drone music, and that the members had swapped instruments on several tracks during its recording. Coombes said of the approach to the album: "This record's actually been very collaborative. It's been cool to try something different and chaotic." Coombes stated that the album was "nearly finished", and it was scheduled for release in May. The album remains unfinished and unreleased. Also in 2010, American rapper Travie McCoy sampled "Alright" in his hit debut solo single "We'll Be Alright".

=== Reformation (2019–present) ===
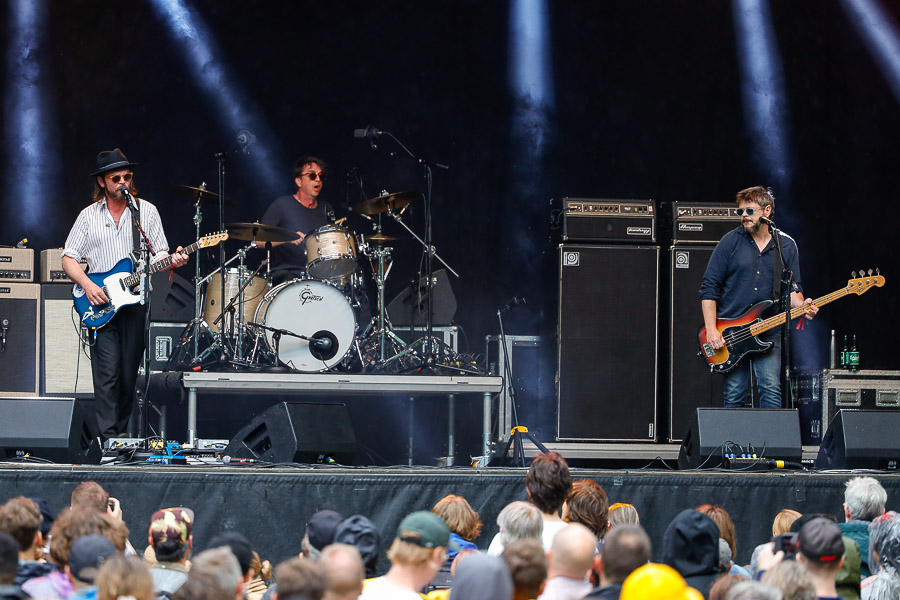
Supergrass in 2022 on stage at the festival Piknik i Parken in Oslo

In July 2019, it was reported in the press that the band were to reform and play at Pilton Party on 6 September 2019. On 22 August 2019, the Twitter account Secretglasto posted "We're not going to Grass up the special guest at the Pilton Party, but we're pretty sure they'll be Super." In an interview with The Times, the band confirmed they are not going to be working on new material, with Goffey stating that "the positive vibe of playing together would be compromised by going into a studio for ages" and that "the idea is to play gigs, not create more music". Gaz Coombes told Q that he was prepared to give a year up to perform with Supergrass, but was wary of promising to make new music.

After performing two warm up shows at The Empire in Coventry and the Cheese & Grain in Frome the band embarked on a short European tour visiting France, Belgium and The Netherlands before doing a full UK tour finishing with two sold-out shows at Alexandra Palace, London on 7 March.

The band were due to tour across America and Australia in April and May 2020 as well as festival appearances in Norway, Italy, Spain, Belgium, the Netherlands and the UK (which would have also included their 5th appearance at Glastonbury) but all were cancelled due to the COVID-19 pandemic.

Despite the tour's cancellation, Supergrass still managed to perform a live-streamed gig on 21 August at The Bullingdon in their hometown of Oxford. The show was a collaboration with Goose Island Brewery and served as a launch event for the new Supergrass-inspired beer Man Sized Brew Sir, which was named after the band's song "Mansize Rooster". Ticket proceeds for the event went to the Nordoff Robbins Music Therapy Charity and the band's charity of choice, the suicide prevention charity CALM. The band also played a socially-distanced show at the Virgin Money Unity Arena in Newcastle the next day.

On 27 November, Supergrass released Live on Other Planets, a live album consisting of songs recorded at various dates on their recent reunion tour. The album was released to mark the band's 25th anniversary; to capture the reunion gigs and thank the fans who attended; and to support grassroots music venues, with proceeds from the album's sales going to the #SaveOurVenues campaign in aid of venues struggling due to the pandemic.

On 3 September 2022 the band performed a 3-song set at the Taylor Hawkins Tribute Concert at Wembley Stadium. Gaz Coombes also took lead vocal duties on covers of David Bowie's "Modern Love" (performed with Nile Rodgers) and the Police's "Every Little Thing She Does Is Magic" (performed with Foo Fighters alongside Stewart Copeland on drums). Following the performance, Gaz Coombes confirmed on his social media that it was the band's "final Supergrass reunion show". "I want to thank all you [Supergrass] fans for the love and incredible support you've shown us over the last three years," he wrote. "It's been a blast." Shortly thereafter, Coombes announced a return to his solo career – as did Goffey, who confirmed the band's hiatus to NME. "Gaz is gonna do something himself, and I've got this thing coming up, so we'll give it a rest for six months and then we'll see," he said.

On 16 September 2024, the band reunited to announce that they would play a 30th Anniversary tour of I Should Coco, in May 2025.

== Solo projects ==
During 1998, Coombes and Quinn were invited to play on Dr John's Anutha Zone album (they appear on the track "Voices In My Head"), whilst Goffey contributed to the debut album by Lodger (which also featured his partner Pearl Lowe and members of the band Delicatessen).

Danny Goffey has also embarked on a solo project between Supergrass engagements called "Van Goffey" which saw tracks being released via MySpace in August 2006, the first three being "Crack House Blues", "I Feel so Gaye" and "Natalie Loves the F". He plays drums on the charity football song "Born In England" by a collective of musicians called Twisted X, which charted at number 8 in the UK Charts in 2004. Danny Goffey was also a drummer on the 2004 charity single "Do They Know It's Christmas?", along with members of Radiohead and the Darkness under the name Band Aid 20.

In July 2008, Coombes joined Foo Fighters on stage during a show that saluted the Who's musical career, VH1 Rock Honors. Coombes performed vocals on the Who's classic song "Bargain".

In 2007 and 2008, while Mick Quinn was still recuperating from his injury, Danny Goffey and Gaz Coombes were performing as the duo Diamond Hoo Ha Men, the name taken from the band's sixth album and its lead single (see above). They appeared in character as Duke Diamond and Randy Hoo Ha to play gigs at small venues. Gigs included an appearance at the Apple Store on London's Regent Street, which featured Mick Quinn's first appearance in the band since his injury. He appeared on stage introduced by Gaz as Biff Hymen.

Goffey and Coombes were members of side-project the Hotrats (originally the Hot Rats). They released an album of covers produced by Nigel Godrich called Turn Ons on 25 January 2010. A cover of "Drive My Car" by the Beatles appears in an advert for Orange, a fragrance by Hugo Boss. Since Supergrass announced they were to split, the Hotrats have joined with Air to perform The Virgin Suicides live for the first time, over several concert dates. A deluxe 3CD / 1DVD box-set of the Hot Rats album was scheduled for release in June 2020.

In May 2010, Mick Quinn formed the DB Band with former Shake Appeal bassist Fab Wilson. The band released their first EP "Stranger in the Alps" on 17 September 2011. They have toured the Netherlands, France and appeared at Oxford's Truck Festival in Steventon.

Gaz Coombes completed his first solo album, Here Come the Bombs, at his home studio in Oxford. The album was recorded with Sam Williams, who produced 1995's I Should Coco for Supergrass, and released on 21 May 2012. Coombes' second album, Matador, was released 26 January 2015, charting at No. 18 on the UK Albums Chart and nominated for the 2015 Mercury Music Prize. Coombes released a third studio album, titled World's Strongest Man on Caroline Records in 2018.

In 2015, Mick Quinn began playing as touring bassist for Swervedriver, whose members Adam Franklin and Jimmy Hartridge were childhood friends of his in Oxford. He would eventually join the band as a full member in 2017, appearing on the band's 2019 album Future Ruins.

== Band members ==
- Gaz Coombes – lead vocals, guitar, bass (1993–2010, 2019–present)
- Mick Quinn – bass, guitar, backing and lead vocals (1993–2010, 2019–present)
- Danny Goffey – drums, percussion, backing and lead vocals (1993–2010, 2019–present)
- Rob Coombes – keyboards, piano, occasional backing vocals (2002–2010, 2019–present; session and touring 1993–2002)

== Discography ==
Studio albums

- I Should Coco (1995)
- In It for the Money (1997)
- Supergrass (1999)
- Life on Other Planets (2002)
- Road to Rouen (2005)
- Diamond Hoo Ha (2008)

== Awards ==
Year	Ceremony	Award	Result
1996	Ivor Novello Awards	Best Contemporary Song ("Alright")	Won
1995	Mercury Prize	Best Album (I Should Coco)	Nominated
1995	NME Awards	Best New Band	Won
1995	NME Awards	Best Single ("Alright")	Nominated
1995	Q Awards	Best New Act	Won
1996	BRIT Awards	British Breakthrough Act	Won
1996	Silver Clef Awards	New Music	Won
1998	BRIT Awards	Best British Video (Late in the Day)	Nominated
2000	BRIT Awards	Best British Video (Pumping on Your Stereo)	Nominated
2000	Teen Choice Awards	Choice Music Video ("Pumping on Your Stereo")	Nominated
2000	MTV Video Music Awards	Breakthrough Video ("Pumping on Your Stereo")	Nominated
2000	MTV Video Music Awards	Best Art Direction ("Pumping on Your Stereo")	Nominated
2000	MTV Video Music Awards	Best Special Effects ("Pumping on Your Stereo")	Nominated
2005	Muso Awards	Best Male Vocal (Gaz Coombes)	Won
2008	UK Music Video Awards	Best Rock Video (Bad Blood)	Won
