= Sun Hits the Sky =

1997 single by Supergrass

Single by Supergrass

from the album In It for the Money
- B-side: "Some Girls Are Bigger Than Others"
- Released: 9 June 1997
- Studio: Sawmills (Golant, UK)
- Genre: Psychedelic rock
- Length: 4:55
- Label: Parlophone
- Songwriters: Supergrass; Rob Coombes
- Producers: Supergrass; John Cornfield

Supergrass singles chronology
"Richard III" (1997)	"Sun Hits the Sky" (1997)	"Late in the Day" (1997)

"Sun Hits the Sky" is a song by English rock band Supergrass. It was released as the third single from the band's second album, In It for the Money (1997), in June 1997. The single reached number 10 on the UK Singles Chart and reached the top 20 in Iceland. The B-side, "Some Girls Are Bigger Than Others", is a cover of the 1986 Smiths song.

== Track listings ==
UK and Australian CD single

1. "Sun Hits the Sky"
2. "Some Girls Are Bigger Than Others"
3. "Sun Hits the Sky" (Radio 1 Evening Session)

UK 7-inch and cassette single

1. "Sun Hits the Sky" (radio edit)
2. "Some Girls Are Bigger Than Others"

Japanese mini-album

1. "Sun Hits the Sky" (radio edit)
2. "Cheapskate"
3. "Some Girls Are Bigger Than Others"
4. "Sun Hits the Sky" (Radio 1 Evening Session)
5. "Odd?" (original version)
6. "Melanie Davis"

== Credits and personnel ==
Credits are taken from the In It for the Money album liner notes.

Studio

- Recorded at Sawmills Studio (Golant, UK)

Personnel

- Supergrass – writing, production, mixing
- Rob Coombes – writing
- Satin Singh – percussion
- John Cornfield – production, mixing

== Charts ==
Chart (1997)	Peak position
Europe (Eurochart Hot 100)	44
Iceland (Íslenski Listinn Topp 40)	16
Netherlands (Single Top 100)	81
Scottish Singles Sales (Official Charts)	7
UK Singles (Official Charts)	10

== Release history ==
Region	Date	Format(s)	Label(s)	Ref.
United Kingdom	9 June 1997	7-inch vinyl; CD; cassette	Parlophone	
Japan	19 July 1997	CD	Parlophone; EMI	
