= Danny Goffey =

English musician and singer-songwriter (born 1974)

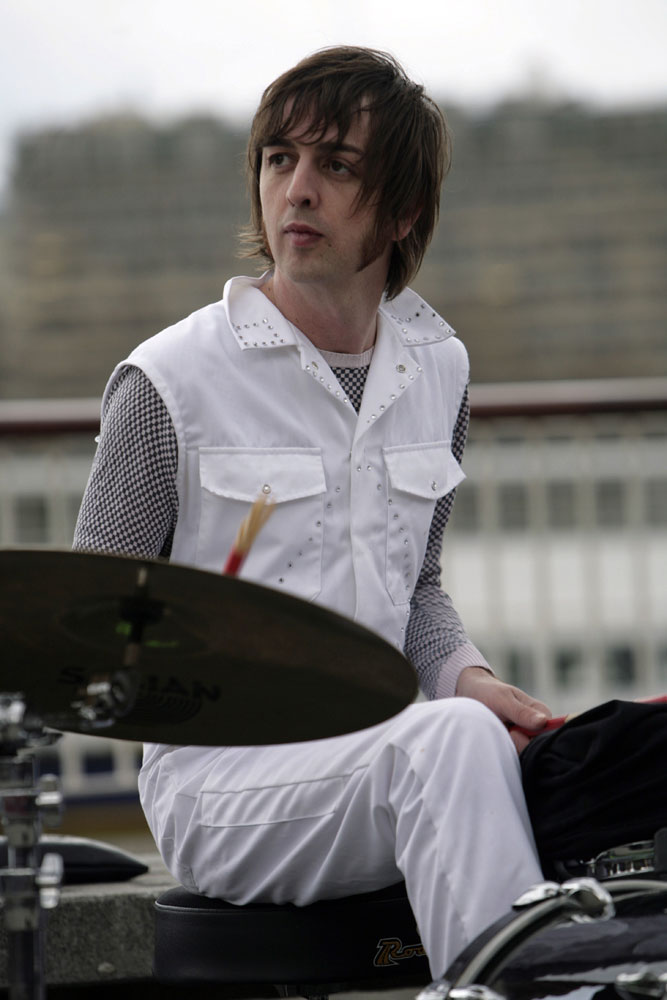
- Goffey performing with Supergrass on London's South Bank in 2008

Background information
- Born: Daniel Robert Goffey; 7 February 1974 (age 52); Eton, Berkshire, England
- Genres: Alternative rock; Britpop; experimental rock
- Occupations: Musician; singer; songwriter
- Instruments: Drums; keyboards; guitar; percussion; piano; vocals
- Years active: 1990–present
- Label: Distiller
- Spouse: Pearl Lowe (m. 2008)
- Website: dannygoffey.tmstor.es

Daniel Robert Goffey (born 7 February 1974) is an English musician and singer-songwriter. He is best known as the drummer and backing vocalist for Supergrass. He briefly toured with Babyshambles in 2010, following their drummer's departure.

== Career ==
=== 1990–1993: The Jennifers ===
Goffey was born on 7 February 1974 in Eton, Berkshire, and started his music career as a child when he formed his first band, The Jubbly Spufflewubs, which consisted of his brother on guitar and friend David Mackay. He had no drums so had to accompany the others by hitting chopsticks on lunch boxes. At age 10 he received a high hat and snare from his parents, prompting him to start his other band, The Fallopian Tubes. They made songs such as "My Wife Shut My Gonads in the Door", Goffey saying: "That one was about sexual frustration I seem to recall. So were all the others [songs]...". At Wheatley Park School, east of Oxford, he became drummer for the four-piece The Jennifers, which featured a 16-year-old Gaz Coombes on vocals. The Jennifers began building a reputation in the Oxford indie music scene and released one single in 1992 on Nude Records before they disbanded.

Allegedly, before the split, Goffey and Coombes had agreed to continue to work together in the future.

=== 1993–2010: Supergrass ===
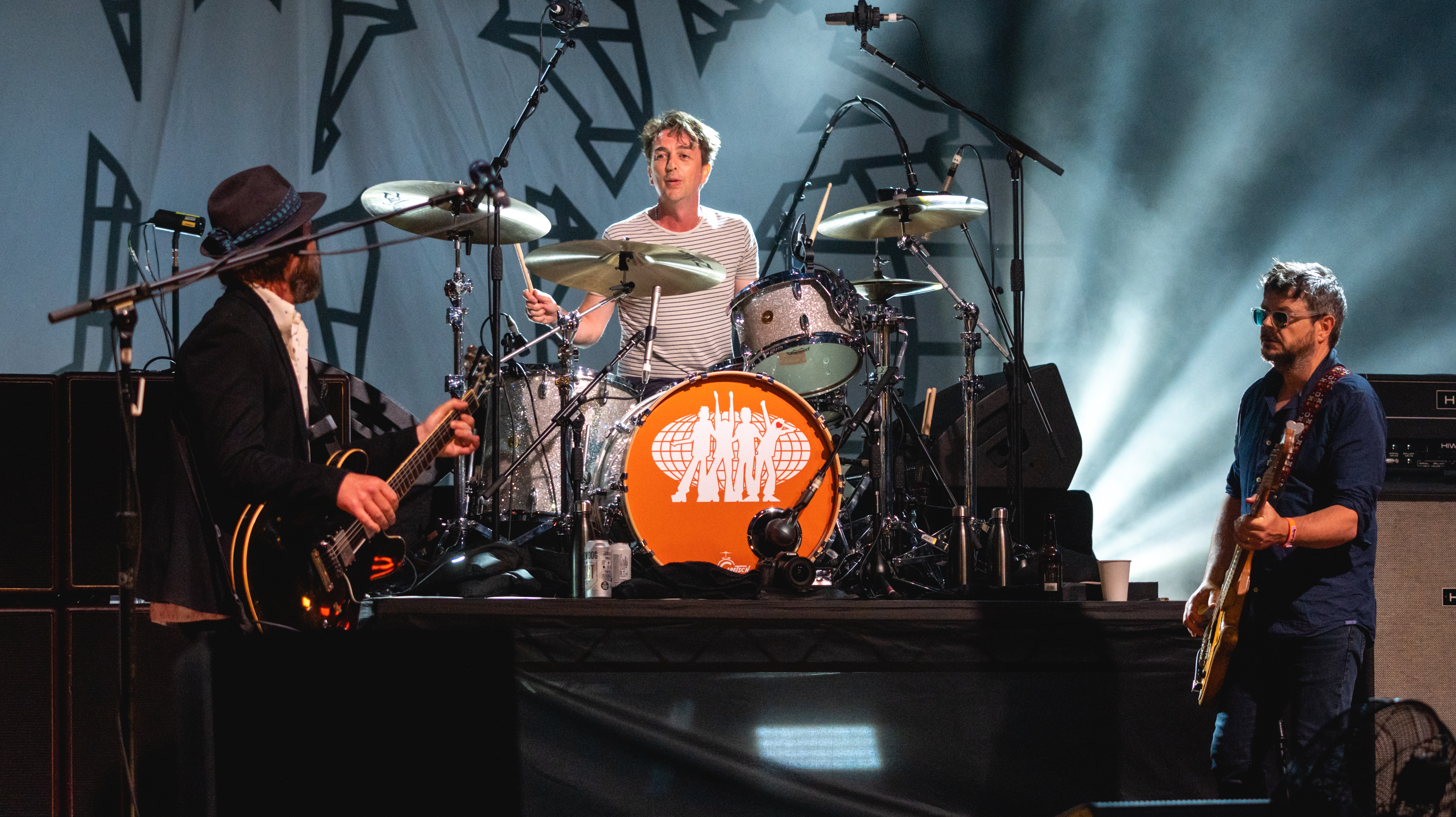
Onstage with Supergrass at the Crystal Palace Bowl, August 2021

In 1993, Coombes introduced Goffey to his co-worker Mick Quinn, who at the time was working at a local Harvester; "I imposed on Mick's life. I imposed on him greatly," said Goffey. "He had a house, and I used to take people back and sleep with them on his sofa. That's how he built his foundation in this band. That's how I met him. I shagged too often on his sofa. But when we played together... we've still never been able to describe it in interviews. When we're in that room, we're all really similar. We know. We all have the same ideas. We're really quick. It just... happens."

The three of them soon started playing together and shortly after Theodore Supergrass, later just Supergrass, were formed. The band enjoyed a good start to their musical career with the release of their debut album I Should Coco (1995) which reached number one in the UK Albums Chart. This good start continued with the release of the single "Alright", which peaked at number two in the UK Singles Chart. Several albums later and Supergrass were still together, recording their next album, tentatively titled Release the Drones, slated for release in May 2010. It remained unreleased and unfinished as, on 12 April 2010, the band announced that it was splitting up due to musical and creative differences. The group disbanded after four farewell gigs, the final one at La Cigale, Paris on 11 June 2010.

Danny's brother, Nic Goffey, who was also a part of The Jennifers, has directed most of Supergrass' music videos, along with his friend Dom. They work under the name Dom and Nic. They have joked on the Supergrass Is 10 DVD about nearly killing the band on several occasions while filming music videos.

== Other projects ==
Goffey embarked on a solo project in 2006 using the pseudonym "Van Goffey", a name based on the artist Vincent van Gogh. He released tracks via MySpace in August 2006, the first three being "Crack House Blues", "I Feel so Gaye" and "Natalie Loves the F". He was also a drummer for the collective of musicians called Twisted X who released a charity football song called "Born in England" which charted at number 8 in the UK Singles Charts in 2004.

In 2004, he joined other musicians including Paul McCartney to record a Christmas charity single called "Do They Know It's Christmas?" which reached number one in the UK Singles Chart.

Goffey appeared with Supergrass on a 'Top Gear of the Pops' special programme for Comic Relief 2007. The band played "Richard III" with Ade Edmondson on second guitar.

In 2007 and 2008, while Supergrass bandmate Mick Quinn was suffering from broken heel and vertebrae, Danny and Gaz Coombes went on a short tour of the country playing at small venues as the Diamond Hoo Ha Men. The tour was captured on film for a Rockumentary called Glange Fever, released in 2008.

Goffey and Gaz Coombes joined other musicians including Paul Weller to record a charity single called "Consequences" for the charity Crisis. The idea for the song came from Danny and his girlfriend, Pearl Lowe, who is an ambassador for the Crisis charity. Their idea was to record a song in the same way that a person would play the game Consequences. A live event took place at the Roundhouse in London on 2 March 2008.

On 7 March 2008, Goffey accompanied politician Boris Johnson in a bid to try to save the post office near where he had grown up in Forest Hill, at Stanton St. John, Oxfordshire. Goffey commented; "I used to buy sweets and cigarettes there and I want my family to be able to continue that tradition."

On 19 March 2008, the Diamond Hoo Ha Men played a gig on London's South Bank (having to change from the originally planned River Thames due to crowd control problems) to raise money for Crisis, offering a free ticket to their London Astoria show to whoever donated the most money. They were watched by around 75 spectators, having previously announced the busking session on radio station Xfm London. This was filmed for the BBC 2 programme, The Culture Show.

Goffey appeared as a contestant in the sixth series of Celebrity Masterchef on BBC One, in which he reached the semi-finals.

As "Vangoffey", he released solo albums Take Your Jacket Off & Get into It in 2015 and Schtick 2018.

== Personal life ==
Goffey is the son of Chris Goffey, motoring journalist and ex-presenter of Top Gear, and his mother is an ex-Labour Party councillor. His brother is Nic Goffey, of the directing partnership Dom and Nic.

Goffey lived in Berkshire up until the age of 13. He originally attended Holy Trinity CE Primary School in the village of Cookham. His family later relocated to the Oxfordshire village of Forest Hill, approximately 4.5 miles east of Oxford. He began to attend nearby Wheatley Park School, where he met Gaz Coombes, two years his junior, on the playing fields of Wheatley School and asked him to form a band with him (The Jennifers). In 1993 (after The Jennifers had separated), he and Coombes began to share a house on Cowley Road in east Oxford, and Goffey studied A-levels at Henley College in Henley-upon-Thames.

During the recording of In It for the Money, Goffey moved out of his and Coombes's house to live in London with his partner, and singer in the band Powder, Pearl Lowe. This introduced Goffey to Lowe's social circle of celebrities such as Liam Gallagher and Kate Moss, and led to a surge of appearances of him in the tabloids. During this time, tensions within Supergrass began to increase, with Goffey often stalling recording of the album in Sawmills Studio, Cornwall by returning to London to record with his second band, Lodger, of which Lowe was also a member. The lyrics for "Going Out" were also causing arguments, as Goffey presumed that Coombes had written them about the column inches he and Lowe had been achieving.

After being together for over thirteen years, Goffey and Lowe married on 4 December 2008, in a small chapel at Babington House, near their home in Frome, Somerset, where they live with their three children. Lowe was expecting another baby, due in autumn 2010, however it was announced by Goffey in May 2010 that Lowe had suffered a miscarriage.

== Discography ==
=== Studio albums ===
Vangoffey

- Take Your Jacket Off & Get into It (Distiller, 2015)

Danny Goffey

- Schtick (Distiller, 2018)
- Bryan Moone's Discopunk (Distiller, 2022)

== See also ==
- Supergrass discography
