= World's Strongest Man (album) =

Studio album by Gaz Coombes
- Released: 4 May 2018
- Genre: Indie rock; art rock
- Length: 42:16
- Label: Hot Fruit
- Producer: Gaz Coombes; Ian Davenport

Gaz Coombes chronology
Matador (2015)	World's Strongest Man (2018)	Turn the Car Around (2023)

Singles from World's Strongest Man
- 1. "Deep Pockets" Released: 30 January 2018

World's Strongest Man is the third studio album by British musician Gaz Coombes. It was released on 4 May 2018, by Hot Fruit Recordings. The album charted at number 12 on the UK Albums Chart

== Critical reception ==
Professional ratings
Aggregate scores
Source	Rating
Metacritic	80/100
Review scores
Source	Rating
AllMusic	3.5/5 stars
Clash	8/10
DIY	3/5 stars
Drowned in Sound	(5/10)
Loud and Quiet	7/10
MusicOMH	4/5 stars
NME	4/5 stars
PopMatters	8/10

World's Strongest Man was met with "generally favorable" reviews from critics. At Metacritic, which assigns a weighted average rating out of 100 to reviews from mainstream publications, this release received an average score of 80, based on 12 reviews.

Stephen Thomas Erlewine of AllMusic said of the album: "Coombes is exploring the outer reaches of his psyche, camouflaging his anxiety underneath shimmering synths, drum loops, and guitars that aren't so much strummed as used for waves of textures. It is clearly cut together on computer, with dense rhythms competing with smooth surfaces - but also not chasing pop trends. Instead, it's a mature modern album." Lisa Wright from DIY noted: "Continuing his route into more elegiac, introverted territory, Gaz’s third solo offering continues to find him moving into his next phase with real class."

=== Accolades ===
Publication	Accolade	Rank	Ref.
Fopp	Top 100 Albums of 2018	14	
Mojo Magazine	Top 75 Albums of 2018	17	
Piccadilly Records	Top 100 Albums of 2018	75	
Rough Trade	Top 100 Albums of 2018	93	

== Track listing ==
No.	Title	Length
1.	"World's Strongest Man"	3:28
2.	"Deep Pockets"	3:50
3.	"Walk the Walk"	3:56
4.	"Shit (I've Done It Again)"	2:58
5.	"Slow Motion Life"	4:28
6.	"Wounded Egos"	4:08
7.	"Oxygen Mask"	4:10
8.	"In Waves"	2:54
9.	"The Oaks"	4:38
10.	"Vanishing Act"	2:50
11.	"Weird Dreams"	4:56
Total length:		42:16

Japanese CD edition bonus tracks
No.	Title	Length
12.	"The Oaks" (Acorns in the Fourth Dimension Mix)	4:23
13.	"The Oaks" (Leftfield Remix)	8:41
Total length:		55:32

== Personnel ==
Credits adapted from AllMusic

Musicians

- Gaz Coombes – primary artist, mixing, producer
- Nick Fowler – bass, guitar
- Colin Greenwood – bass
- Garo Nahoulakian – piano
- Beverlei Brown – backing vocals
- Faith Simpson – backing vocals
- Loz Colbert – backing vocals
- Gita Langley – violin

Production

- Ian Davenport – producer
- Bob Ludwig – mastering
- Craig Silvey – mixer

== Charts ==
Chart (2018)	Peak position
Belgian Albums (Ultratop Wallonia)	150
French Albums (SNEP)	188
UK Albums (OCC)	12
