= Lenny (Supergrass song) =

Single by Supergrass

Single by Supergrass

from the album I Should Coco
- B-side: "Wait for the Sun"
- Released: 1 May 1995
- Studio: Sawmills (Golant, England)
- Length: 2:42
- Label: Parlophone
- Songwriter(s): Supergrass
- Producer(s): Sam Williams

Supergrass singles chronology
"Lose It" (1995)	"Lenny" (1995)	"Alright" / "Time" (1995)

"Lenny" is a song by English rock band Supergrass, released in May 1995 by Parlophone as the fourth single from their debut album, I Should Coco (1995). It was produced by Sam Williams and reached number 10 on the UK Singles Chart, remaining on the chart for three weeks.

== Critical reception ==
Pan-European magazine Music & Media wrote, "Steam hammer monotony in the intro soon turns into souped-up '60s pop brought with the right brattish attitude. Stay tuned for some 'Sex!' education on the hilarious country bonus track." Boy George reviewed the song for Select and named it Georges Single of the Month, saying, "I just think this is really exciting. Quite sexual and uplifting. There's bits of T.Rex and all sorts of influences but...everything is theft anyway." Jordan Paramor from Smash Hits gave it three out of five in her review of the single.

== Track listings ==
- CD (CDR6410)
1. "Lenny" (2:42)
2. "Wait for the Sun" (4:09)
3. "Sex!" (2:35)
- 7-inch and cassette (RS6410; TCR6410)
1. "Lenny" (2:42)
2. "Wait for the Sun" (4:09)
