= Gaz Coombes =

British singer and guitarist (born 1976)

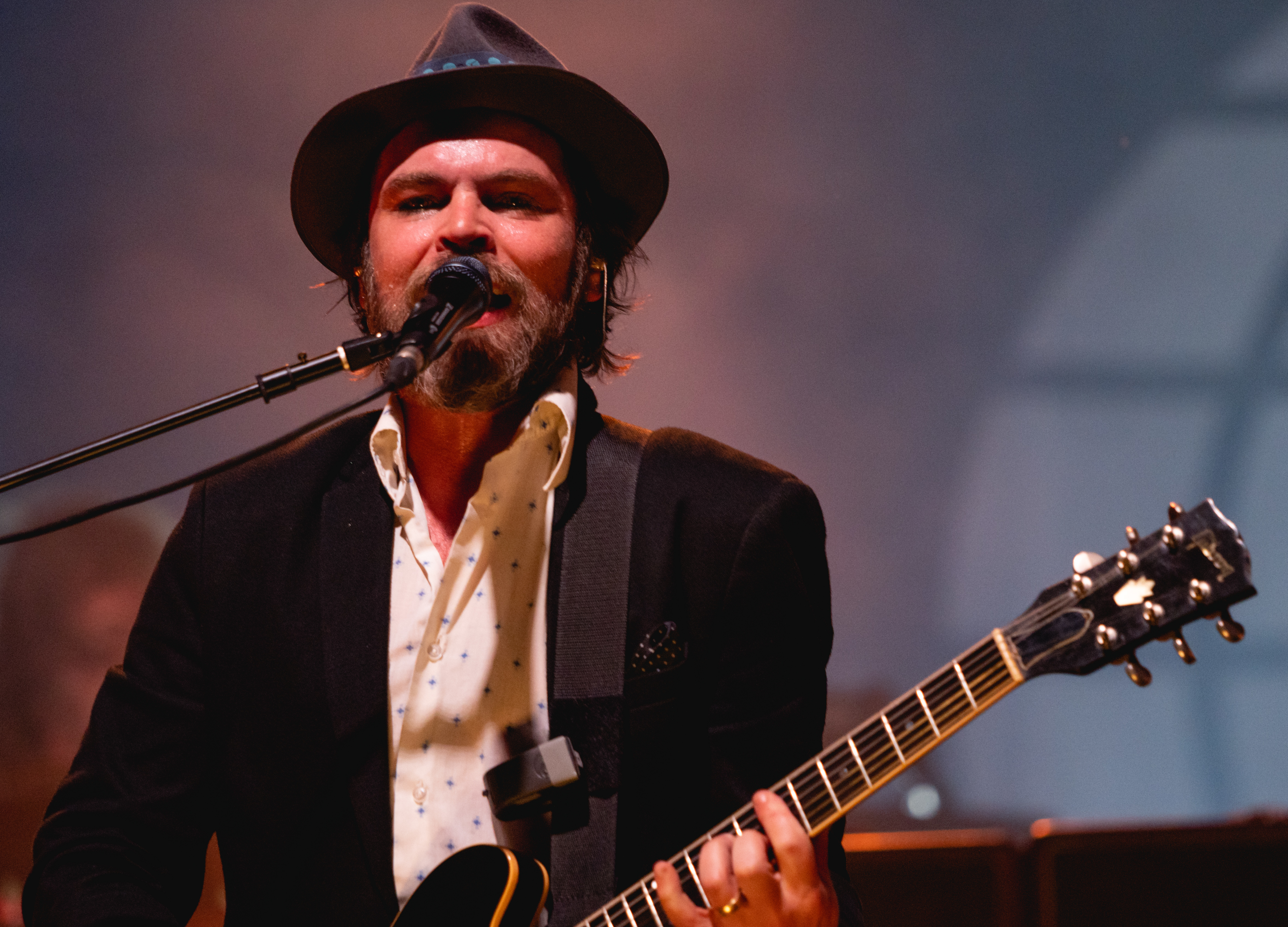
- Coombes in 2021

Background information
- Born: Gareth Michael Coombes; 8 March 1976 (age 50); Oxford, England
- Genres: Alternative rock; Britpop
- Occupations: Singer; musician; songwriter
- Instruments: Vocals; guitar
- Years active: 1990–present
- Website: gazcoombes.com

Gareth Michael "Gaz" Coombes (born 8 March 1976) is an English musician, best known as the lead vocalist and guitarist of the alternative rock band Supergrass. He first entered the music scene aged 14 as the lead singer of the band The Jennifers which featured Supergrass bandmate Danny Goffey.

== Early life ==
Born on 8 March 1976 in Oxford, England, Coombes is the son of Eileen and John Coombes. His father was a food scientist, who enjoyed playing jazz piano, and his mother was an English teacher. Although he was born in England, he lived with his family in San Francisco, California, from around the age of 5 up until the age of 9, at which point in 1985 they moved back to Oxford.

Coombes played classical piano at this age, but gradually moved on to an interest in playing guitar. He began to attend Wheatley Park School in Holton, Oxfordshire, but found himself being picked on for being 'girly'. His elder brother Rob was friends with Nic Goffey at the time, and one day on the school's playing fields a 13-year-old Gaz Coombes met and befriended Nic's younger brother, 15-year-old Danny Goffey. Danny Goffey was two years older than Coombes and helped to "protect him" from being teased. Goffey recounts what happened; "I mean, you couldn't fucking miss him. He was gorgeous. He grew sideburns and they [other pupils] gave him loads of shit, but I was really into him. I think I fancied him a bit, y'know? He's really beautiful. He wasn't very mature at that age. He was like a kid. I just went up to him and asked him to form a band. I could. I was a drummer. The tallest drummer in the school."

== Career ==
=== 1990–1993: The Jennifers ===
Coombes first entered the music world at age 14 as the lead singer of the band The Jennifers. They recorded their demo at Stargoat, Banbury, released April 1991 a month after Gaz turned 15. The band undertook a nationwide tour before Coombes was fifteen. When they signed for their first recording contract with Nude Records, Coombes was under 18 at the time and so had to have his mother sign the contract for him.

"There were a couple of ridiculous, punky, joke songs – "Harvey The Accountant" and "The Girl with the Removable Face". That one went: "The girl with the removable face/She didn't have much of a life/All the boys used to pull it off/And use it as a frisbee." Most of them were in that vein. Actually, we haven't changed much." says Coombes about some Jennifers songs.

The Jennifers released "Just Got Back Today" on Nude Records in 1992 before they disbanded.

After the mild success experienced by The Jennifers, but still living with his parents, Coombes got a job at the local Harvester. He would take old Jennifers demos and play them over the restaurant's PA system before it opened, and this eventually led to him meeting Mick Quinn, a co-worker who played bass guitar and shared his musical tastes. With Danny Goffey they began to practice at Quinn's house, and Supergrass was formed shortly thereafter.

=== 1993–2010: Supergrass ===
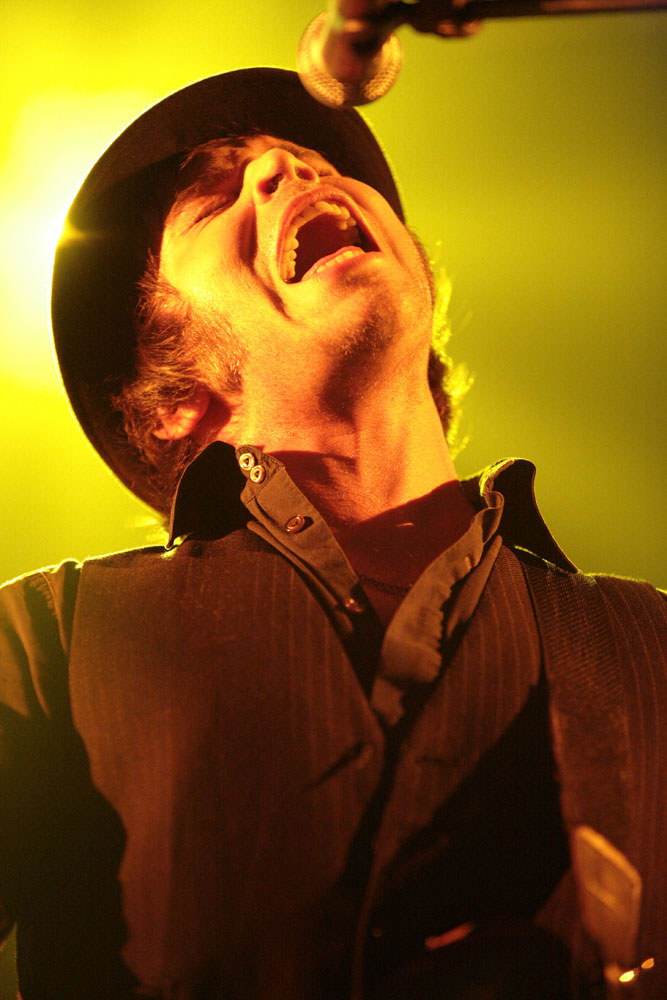
Coombes performing with Supergrass in London in 2008

In 1993 after The Jennifers disbanded, Coombes, Goffey and Quinn formed Supergrass. In 2002, Coombes's brother keyboardist Rob Coombes officially joined the band. Before that he was studying for an Astrophysics degree at Cardiff University. The band released six studio albums in their 17 years together, each of them entering the UK top 20: I Should Coco (1995), In It for the Money (1997), Supergrass (1999), Life on Other Planets (2002), Road to Rouen (2005) and Diamond Hoo Ha (2008). They also released a singles compilation Supergrass Is 10 (2004), commemorating the first decade of the band's life.

During the height of Supergrass's fame, around 1995, Coombes received offers from Vogue Italia and Calvin Klein to model for them in their ad campaigns and magazine publications, as well as an offer from Steven Spielberg to make a Monkees-style TV show of the band. Coombes however, along with the rest of the band, declined these offers, saying; "Yes, we probably would have been face down in a pool if we'd said yes to all that. I mean, our heads would have returned to our shoulders at some point, but... it felt like cheating. Too easy. Short cut. Y'know? If you have to do all that to be the biggest band in the world then... then what does that say about your music? And all that... [the publicity offers] would have just got in the way of the music. It would have taken so long to get to grips with. We'd have lost years."

In 1999, Coombes made an appearance on the "Da Ali G Show" and played the Supergrass song "Sun Hits the Sky", whilst having to deal with Ali G 'remixing' it as he performed. "I tried to take the mickey out of his goatee, and he came back with: "So, you are looking like a monkey..." But if you go on his show, you know what you're letting yourself in for."

Coombes appeared on The Annex on RTÉ 2fm with Jenny Huston alongside Goffey before Supergrass took the stage at Malahide Castle in Dublin, Ireland to support Arctic Monkeys on 16 June 2007.

On 12 April 2010, Coombes and the rest of Supergrass announced that the band was to split after seventeen years. Musical differences were cited as the reason. They played four farewell concerts before the split. Their seventh album Release the Drones remains unfinished and unreleased.

=== 2010–present: Solo career ===
Coombes announced on 28 October in The Hotrats and Supergrass Facebook page that he was working on his first solo album, recorded at his studio in Oxford with producer Sam Williams, and claimed that the record was on its final stages, planned to release it in 2011. He played most of the instruments on the record.

Coombes starred in an advert for the Toyota Yaris where he plays himself and encounters a fan who wants a picture with him. The Supergrass single "Pumping on Your Stereo" also appears in the advert.

Coombes appeared on and produced the single "Wonderful" by Little Fish, which was released in October 2011. In December 2011, Coombes performed his first solo shows at The Rotunda in Oxford and released his debut solo single "Hot Fruit" on 14 March 2012. His debut album, Here Come the Bombs was released shortly after and was well received by critics and fans alike.

In May 2014, Coombes recorded a cover version of The Kinks' song "This Time Tomorrow" for a television advertisement for the UK department store, John Lewis. The song was subsequently released as a digital single on the Caroline International label.

Coombes's second solo album, Matador, was released on 26 January 2015. The album debuted at number 18 in the Official UK Album chart and was also nominated for a Mercury Prize and an Ivor Novello award.

On 24 June 2016, Coombes supported The Last Shadow Puppets (featuring Arctic Monkeys' front man, Alex Turner, and Miles Kane) at Bristol Summer Series.

On 10 January 2018, Coombes announced his third solo album, World's Strongest Man would be released in May. The announcement was accompanied by the launch of the single "Deep Pockets".

== Personal life ==
Coombes originally lived in Wheatley, then at 345 Cowley Road, East Oxford. He moved to a Regency townhouse in Brighton, East Sussex, which he first purchased in 1999, with his partner Jools Poore and their daughter, Raya May (born 2003). Due to the death of his mother, Eileen, in 2005, he felt compelled to move back into her house in Oxford during 2006, where he had grown up. Coombes and his partner now have a second daughter, named Tiger (b. 17 May 2008). Gaz Coombes and his brothers Rob Coombes, Charly Coombes and Eddie Coombes also jointly own a converted barn in Northern France, which is where the Supergrass album Road to Rouen was recorded.

His three siblings are all involved in music: the second eldest is a keyboardist and fellow Supergrass member Rob, former 22-20s keyboardist Charly and Paris-based Ed, the eldest brother (who also plays piano).

He is a Manchester United fan, and has appeared on the club's TV channel, MUTV.

== Discography ==
=== Albums ===
Title	Album details	Peak chart positions	
Title	Album details	UK	BEL (WA)
Here Come the Bombs	Released: 21 May 2012; Label: Hot Fruit; Formats: CD, digital download	54	—
Matador	Released: 26 January 2015; Label: Hot Fruit/Caroline International; Formats: CD, LP, streaming, digital download	18	100
World's Strongest Man	Released: 4 May 2018; Label: Hot Fruit/Caroline International; Formats: CD, LP, streaming, digital download	12	150
Turn the Car Around	Released: 13 January 2023; Label: Hot Fruit/Virgin Music; Formats: CD, LP, streaming, digital download, cassette	6	101

=== EPs ===
Year	Title
2015	Matador (Da Capo)
2018	Live in Paris
2019	Sheldonian/Live
2023	Turn the Tracks Around

=== Singles ===
Year	Title	Album
2012	"Sub Divider"	Here Come the Bombs
2012	"Hot Fruit"	Here Come the Bombs
2012	"Simulator"	Here Come the Bombs
2012	"White Noise"	Here Come the Bombs
2013	"Break the Silence"	Here Come the Bombs
2013	"Buffalo"	Matador
2014	"This Time Tomorrow"	N/A
2015	"20/20"	Matador
2015	"Detroit"	Matador
2015	"The Girl Who Fell to Earth"	Matador
2018	"Deep Pockets"	World's Strongest Man
2019	"Salamander"	N/A
2022	"Sonny the Strong"	Turn the Car Around
2022	"Don't Say It's Over"	Turn the Car Around
