= Golant =

Coordinates: 50.3629°N 4.6416°W

Golant: Cornish: Golnans
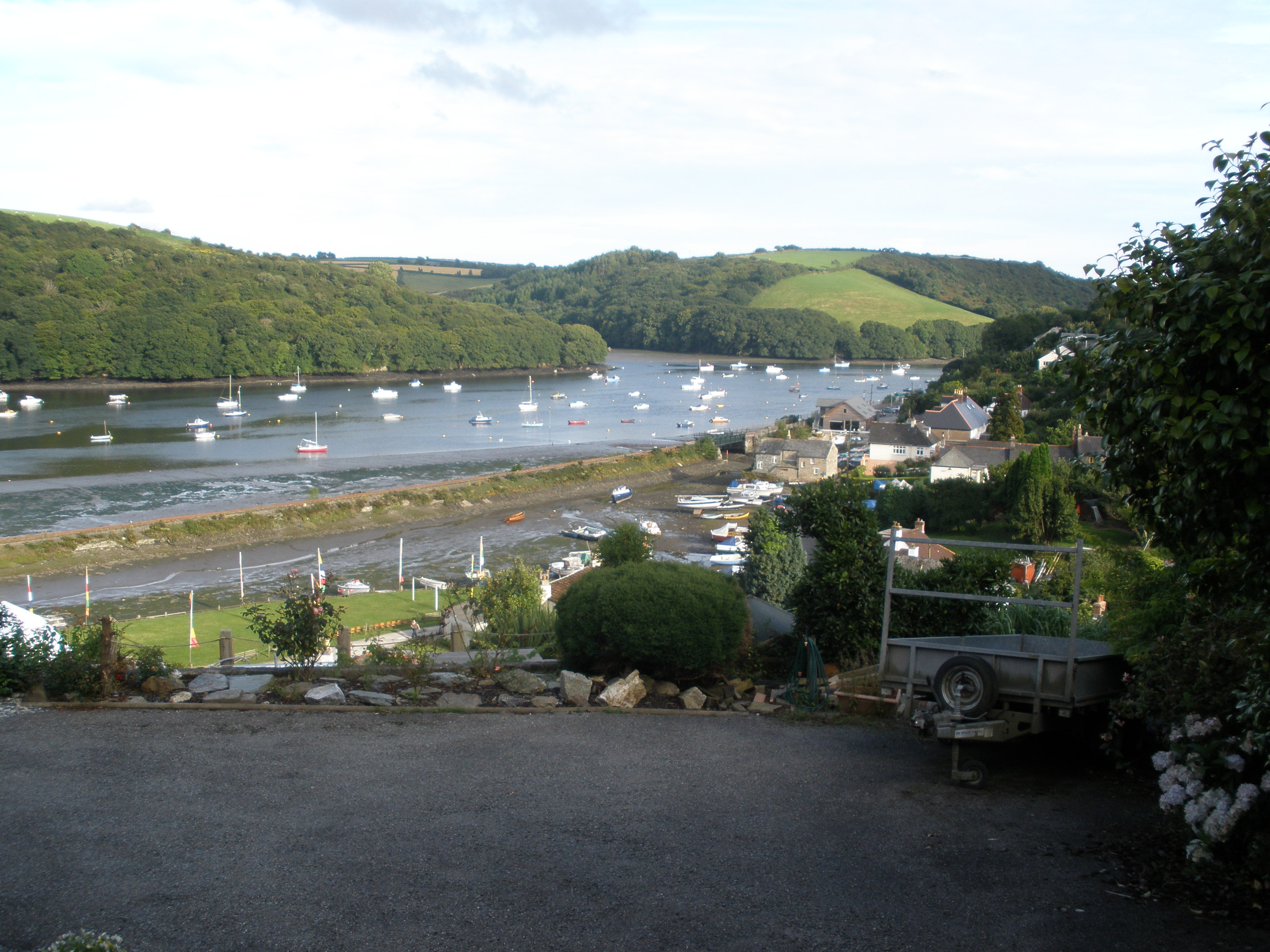
- The Fowey estuary at Golant

- Location within Cornwall
- OS grid reference: SX122548
- Civil parish: St Sampson
- Unitary authority: Cornwall
- Ceremonial county: Cornwall
- Region: South West
- Country: England
- Sovereign state: United Kingdom
- Post town: FOWEY
- Postcode district: PL23
- Dialling code: 01726
- Police: Devon and Cornwall
- Fire: Cornwall
- Ambulance: South Western
- UK Parliament: South East Cornwall

Golant (Cornish: Golnans) is a village in south Cornwall, England, United Kingdom. It is on the west bank of the River Fowey and in the civil parish of St Sampson.

Golant is about two miles (3.2 km) north of Fowey and seven miles (11 km) east of St Austell.

Golant church is dedicated to St Sampson of Dol. The poet John Betjeman remarked that its pews were "extremely uncomfortable, recall the fidgets of Gus and Flora in Ravenshoe". The church was mentioned in the book England’s Thousand Best Churches by Simon Jenkins.

The village is on the Saints' Way long-distance footpath.

== History ==
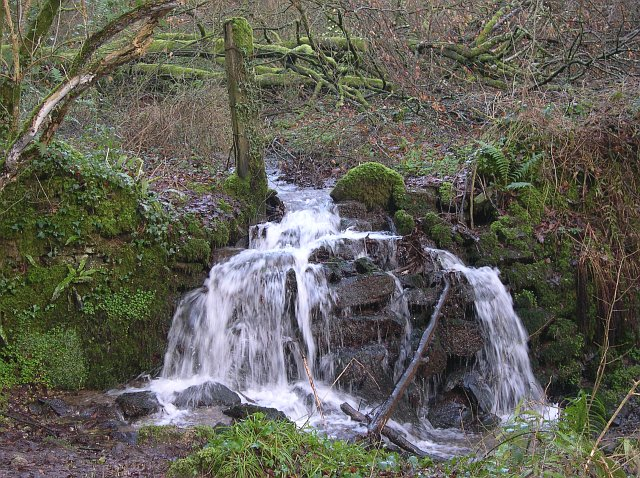
Waterfall near Golant

A once well-used ford crossed the river near Golant. During the English Civil War in 1644 a 10,000-strong parliamentary army fought Royalist forces in the area. King Charles was in the area during the campaign. The Earl of Essex and other prominent parliamentarians escaped by boat to Plymouth. Many 17th century cannonballs and musket balls have been found in the area.

Golant Halt was a railway station situated beside the river south of the village. It was served by trains on the Great Western Railway's Fowey branch line from 1 July 1896 until 4 January 1965. The station has been demolished and the site is now a car park. The nearest railway station is now at Par.

== The Sawmills ==
The Sawmills recording studio was established in 1974. The main building is a 17th-century water mill and the site has a documented history stretching back to the 11th century. Artists such as The Stone Roses, The Verve and Swans have recorded at the Sawmills. The Oasis album Definitely Maybe was also recorded there.

The studio was featured in the BBC programme Three Men in More Than One Boat starring Rory McGrath, Griff Rhys Jones and Dara Ó Briain shown in January 2009. Little recording takes place at Sawmills nowadays and the building is principally used as a holiday let.

== Notable people ==
- Annabel Vernon, the Olympic rower, was a member of Castle Dore Rowing Club in Golant.
- Charles I of England, who camped at Castle Dore "on the night before the surrender of the Parliamentary army in 1644" according to Arthur Mee
- Giuseppe Garibaldi, who lodged with Colonel Peard for some time after the gaining of Italian independence; Peard had fought in the campaign and was known as "Garibaldi's Englishman".
