= Rob Coombes =

British keyboardist

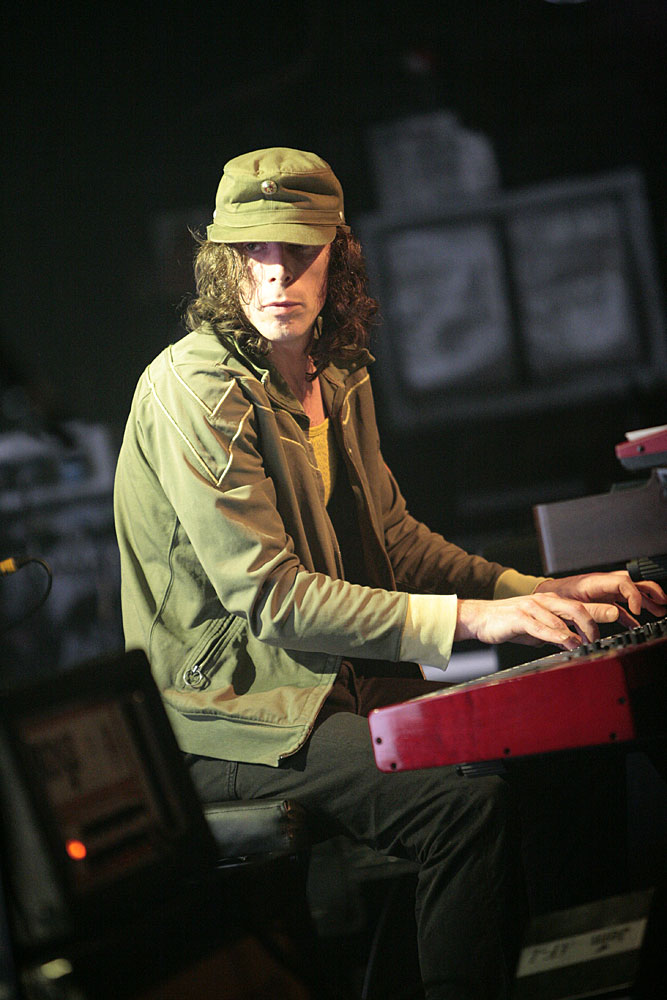
- Rob Coombes performing with Supergrass in London in April 2008

Background information
- Born: Robert Joseph Coombes; 27 April 1972 (age 53); Oxford, England
- Genres: Alternative rock; britpop
- Occupations: Musician
- Instruments: Keyboards
- Years active: 1991–present
- Member of: Supergrass
- Website: supergrass.com

Robert Joseph Coombes (born 27 April 1972) is an English musician and composer, best known as the keyboardist for the rock band Supergrass, fronted by his younger brother Gaz. Since 2022, he has also toured with the punk rock supergroup Wingmen, consisting of members from bands such as The Stranglers, Johnny Moped, The Damned and Ruts DC.

== Career ==
=== Supergrass ===
From the start of the band's career, Coombes frequently collaborated with the group as both a session and touring musician and songwriter and arranger. He later joined the band as a permanent member in 2002, making his official debut on the album Life on Other Planets.

=== Wingmen ===
In 2022, Rob joined the supergroup Wingmen which features members of The Stranglers, Johnny Moped, The Damned and Ruts DC (or the Ruts). They played their first gig at the Colchester Arts Centre on 18 January 2023. Their debut self-titled album was released on 27 January 2023.

== Personal life ==
Coombes is the older brother of Supergrass frontman Gaz Coombes and 22–20s keyboardist Charly Coombes. He lives in Oxford with his three children.

== Equipment ==
He favours the Hammond Organ, for which his playing has been described as “the perfect foil to Gaz's guitar bombast”.

== Discography ==
=== With Wingmen ===
==== Albums ====
Title	Year
Wingmen	2023
