= Sawmills Studios =

UK music recording studio

Coordinates: 50.354197°N 4.6410°W

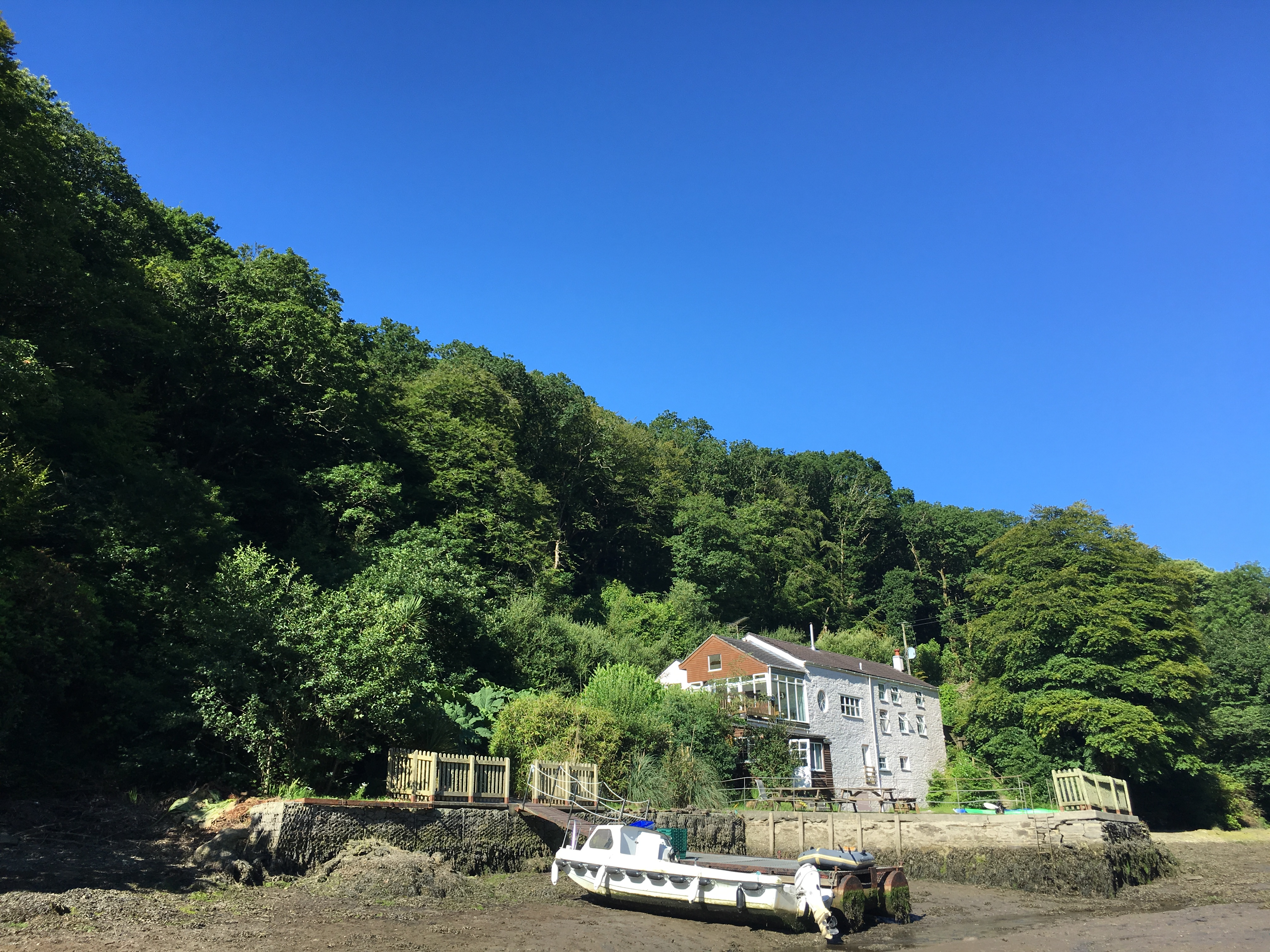
The Sawmills Studios at low tide

Sawmills Studios is a recording studio founded in 1974 by record producer, Tony Cox. It is located in Golant, on the banks of the River Fowey in Cornwall.

== Description ==
The studio building is located on the tidal creek on the banks of the Fowey. Sawmills was one of the first residential recording facilities in the UK. The main building is a former 17th-century water mill and the site has a documented history stretching back to the 11th century. The location is unusual as it can be accessed only by boat or the Saints' Way footpath that runs past the studio, and this location is considered one of UK's "residential recording studios".

Bands and artists that have used the studio for recording include The Stone Roses ("Fools Gold"), The Verve (A Storm in Heaven), Muse, Oasis (Definitely Maybe), Catatonia, Ride, Swans, Smoke Fairies, Supergrass and The Bluetones.

In July 2020, the studio and property were listed for sale according to press releases.

The studio has been refurbished and part of the house is used as holiday lets.

== Dangerous Records ==
The present owner of the studio, Dennis Smith, formed a record label based at Sawmills, which was called Dangerous Records. They released two extended plays by Muse, who began their career at Sawmills, and later formed Taste Media for the band.
