= Swervedriver discography =

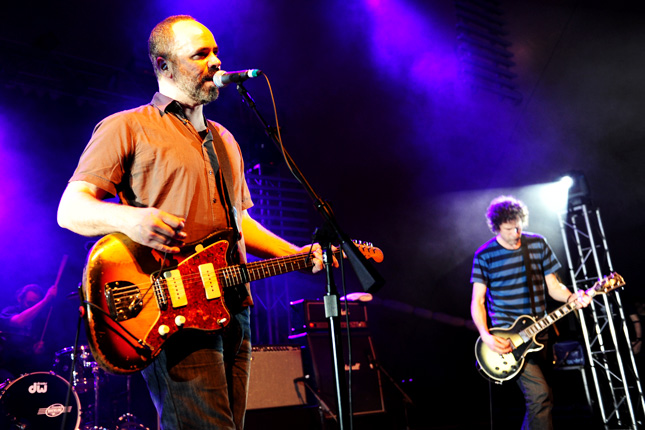
- Swervedriver performing at the Perth International Arts Festival, 2011. From left to right: Graham Bonnar, Adam Franklin, and Jimmy Hartridge.
- Studio albums: 6
- EPs: 7
- Soundtrack albums: 1
- Compilation albums: 1
- Singles: 19
- B-sides: 25
- Video albums: 2

The discography of Swervedriver, an English alternative rock band, consists of six studio albums, one compilation album, one video album, seven extended plays, and eighteen singles. The band's back catalog of non-studio-album material rivals that which has been released in album format.

Swervedriver was formed in 1989 by vocalist and guitarist Adam Franklin, guitarist Jimmy Hartridge, bassist Adrian "Adi" Vines, and drummer Graham Bonnar. Though emerging from the shoegazing scene of Oxford, the band also incorporated contemporary American guitar rock into its sound. They signed with British independent record label Creation and released the Son of Mustang Ford and Rave Down EPs in 1990. In early 1991, the band signed with American label A&M Records and put forth its third EP, Sandblasted. The band then released its debut full-length album, Raise, later that year, charting 44th in the UK.

Following the departure of founding members Bonnar and Vines, Swervedriver enlisted new drummer Jeremy "Jez" Hindmarsh in 1993 and released their second album, Mezcal Head (with Franklin and Hartridge splitting bass duties). The album debuted at number 55 on the UK chart and provided their most popular single, "Duel", which reached number 60. Bassist Steve George also joined the group, and after two years of touring and recording, they released their third album, Ejector Seat Reservation, in 1995. Label troubles thwarted a North American release of Ejector Seat Reservation and later forced the band to seek out independent label Zero Hour from New York City to release 1998's indie rock-styled fourth effort, 99th Dream.

At the end of 1998, the band dissolved for what would become a nine-year hiatus. On 14 March 2005, Castle Music released Juggernaut Rides '89–'98, a two-disc anthology compiling numerous tracks that had previously been only on seven-inch singles or unavailable. Swervedriver announced their reunion on 19 October 2007; the band would release its first material in fifteen years with the 2013 single "Deep Wound" on Tym Records. They have since released two more full-length albums, I Wasn't Born to Lose You on Cobraside in 2015 and Future Ruins in 2019, with former touring stand-ins and new permanent members drummer Mikey Jones and bassist Mick Quinn.

== Albums ==
=== Studio albums ===
List of studio albums, with selected chart positions
Title	Album details	Peak chart position
Title	Album details	UK
Raise (Note: Initial copies of the Creation LP included a free limited edition 7" single, "Surf Twang/Deep Twang".) (Note: Remastered and extended edition issued 13 October 2008 in UK by Sony BMG.) (Note: Remastered and extended edition issued 20 January 2009 in US by Hi-Speed Soul / Second Motion Records.)	Released: 30 September 1991; Labels: Creation / A&M / Shock; Formats: LP, CD, CS	44
Mezcal Head (Note: US release includes the bonus track "Never Lose That Feeling/Never Learn".)	Released: 12 August 1993; Labels: Creation / A&M / Sony Music; Formats: LP, CD, CS	55
Ejector Seat Reservation (Note: Initial promo CD includes the additional track "It's All Happening Now") (Note: Initial copies of the LP included a free limited edition 7" single, "Flaming Heart/Plan 7 Star Satellite 10".) (Note: Reissued 2003 by Sony Music Media.)	Released: 15 July 1995; Labels: Creation / Sony Music; Formats: LP, CD	—
99th Dream (Note: 1997 DGC Records promo CD features the original version of "These Times".) (Note: Zero Hour LP included a free limited edition 7" single, "Good Ships".)	Released: 24 February 1998; Labels: Zero Hour / Sonic Wave Discs / Shock; Formats: LP, CD	—
I Wasn't Born to Lose You	Released: 3 March 2015; Labels: Cobraside; Formats: LP, CD	—
Future Ruins	Released: 25 January 2019; Labels: Dangerbird / Rock Action; Formats: LP, CD	—
"—" denotes a recording that did not chart.

=== Compilation albums ===
List of compilation albums
Title	Album details
Juggernaut Rides '89–'98	Released: 14 March 2005; Label: Creation / Castle Music; Format: double CD
Doremi Faso Latido	Released: 30 August 2024; Label: 554874; Format: LP, Digital download, streaming

=== Video albums ===
List of video albums
Title	Album details
On the Road with Swervedriver: A Rockumentary	Released: 14 May 1992; Label: A&M; Format: promo VHS; Runtime: 42:51
Live in Sydney	Released: March 2012; Label: Cobraside Distribution Inc.; Format: DVD; Runtime: 78:10

== Extended plays ==
List of extended plays, showing track lists
Title	EP details
Son of Mustang Ford	Released: 16 July 1990; Labels: Creation / A&M; Formats: 12", CD; UK No. 158
Rave Down	Released: November 1990; Labels: Creation / A&M / Shock; Formats: 12", CD; UK No. 136
Sandblasted	Released: 22 July 1991; Labels: Creation / A&M / Shock; Formats: 12", CD
Reel to Real	Released: 1991; Label: A&M; Formats: 12", CD
Never Lose That Feeling	Released: 18 May 1992; Label: Creation; Formats: 12", CD
Last Train to Satansville	Released: 1993; Label: A&M; Format: promo CD Digipak
Space Travel, Rock 'n' Roll	Released: 10 February 1998; Labels: Zero Hour / Shock / Sonic Wave Discs; Formats: 12", CD
The World's Fair	Released: 7 March 2025; Label: Bandcamp; Formats: 12", digital download

== Singles ==
List of singles, with selected chart positions, showing accompanying tracks
Title	Single details	Peak chart position	Accompanying Track(s)
Title	Single details	UK	Accompanying Track(s)
"Sandblasted"	Released: 22 July 1991; Label: Creation; Format: 7"	67	B. "Out" (3:24)
"Surf Twang/Deep Twang"	Released: 30 September 1991; Label: Creation; Format: 7" limited	—	A. "Surf Twang" (2:28); B. "Deep Twang" (3:23)
"Never Lose That Feeling"	Released: 18 May 1992; Label: Creation; Format: 7"	62	B. "Scrawl and Scream" (3:50)
"Duel"	Released: 2 August 1993; Labels: Creation / A&M; Formats: 12", 7", CD, promo CD Digipak	60	2. "Planes Over the Skyline" (4:40); 3. "Year of the Girl" (5:24); 4. "Duel" (LP version) (Digipak only) (6:23)
"For Seeking Heat"	Released: 1993; Label: Creation; Format: 12" promo	—	B. "Blowin' Cool" (3:53)
"Last Train to Satansville"	Released: 1994; Label: Creation; Format: 12", CD	—	2. "Jesus" (4:17); 3. "Satansville Revisited" (6:48); 4. "Land of the Lost" (4:12)
"My Zephyr"	Released: 1994; Label: Flower Shop; Format: 7" limited (1000 copies)	—	A. "My Zephyr (Sequel)" (3:31); B. "Mars" (6:23)
"Last Day on Earth"	Released: 1995; Label: Creation; Format: 12" limited white, CD	99	2. "Maelström" (4:41); 3. "I Am Superman" (3:36); 4. "The Director's Cut Of Your Life" (4:37)
"Bring Me the Head of the Fortune Teller"	Released: May 1995; Label: Creation; Format: 12" promo	—	B. "The Birds" (3:41)
"Flaming Heart/Plan 7 Star Satellite 10"	Released: 13 July 1995; Labels: Creation / Sonic Wave Discs; Format: 7" limited	—	A. "Flaming Heart" (2:26); B. "Plan 7 Star Satellite 10" (1:05)
"Why Say Yeah"	Released: 1996; Labels: Echostatic / Space Baby; Format: double 7" split (with Sophia)	—	A. "Why Say Yeah" (3:13); B. "In My Time" (4-Track Version) (4:29)
"Magic Bus"	Released: 17 February 1997; Label: A&M; Format: 7"/CD split (with Happy Campers)	—	1. "Magic Bus (edit)" (The Who cover) (3:39); 2. "Magic Bus" (9:55)
"93 Million Miles from the Sun... (and Counting)"	Released: 1997; Label: Sessions Records; Format: 7"	—	A. "93 Million Miles from the Sun... (and Counting)" (3:25); B. "Up From The Sea" (4-Track Version) (3:23)
"Good Ships"	Released: 4 February 1998; Label: Zero Hour; Format: 7" limited	—	A. "Good Ships" (4:32); B. "Hate Yr Kind" (4:04)
"Wrong Treats"	Released: 6 July 1998; Labels: Sonic Wave Discs / Shock; Format: CD	—	2. "Homeless Homecoming" (6:46); 3. "Château In Virginia Waters" (T. Rex cover) (4:04)
"These Times"	Released: 1998; Label: Shock; Format: CD	—	2. "Homeless Homecoming" (6:46); 3. "Château In Virginia Waters" (4:04)
"The Hitcher"	Released: 25 June 2008; Label: Hi-Speed Soul; Format: 7" limited red (1000 copies)	—	B. "Just Sometimes" (2:13)
"Deep Wound"	Released: 26 September 2013; Label: Tym Records; Formats: 7" limited purple (100 copies), red (200 copies), & yellow (300 copies)	—	A. "Deep Wound" (4:13); B. "Dub Wound" (4:11)
"Setting Sun"	Released: 13 January 2015; Label: Cobraside; Formats: Digital download, vinyl	—	B. "Days" (Television cover)
"Spiked Flower"	Released: 11 January 2019; Label: Dangerbird; Formats: Digital download	—	
"—" denotes a recording that did not chart.
