= Juggernaut Rides '89–'98 =

Juggernaut Rides '89-'98

Compilation album by Swervedriver
- Released: 14 March 2005
- Genre: Alternative rock
- Label: Creation Records/Castle Music

Swervedriver chronology
99th Dream (1998)	Juggernaut Rides '89-'98 (2005)	I Wasn't Born to Lose You (2015)

Professional ratings
Review scores
Source	Rating
Allmusic	4.5/5 stars
Kerrang	3/4 stars
Metroactive	
Mojo	4/5 stars
Pitchfork	8.4/10
Uncut	3/5 stars

Juggernaut Rides '89–'98 is a two-disc anthology of 33 Swervedriver songs, including 16 non-album tracks. Eight of these later appeared as bonus tracks on the 2008/2009 "Remastered and Expanded" editions of the first three Swervedriver albums.

== Track listing ==
Disc One
No.	Title	Original Release	Length
1.	"Son of Mustang Ford"	"Son of Mustang Ford" EP / Raise	4:19
2.	"Planes Over the Skyline"	"Duel" single / Mezcal Head Remastered and Expanded	4:39
3.	"The Birds"	Ejector Seat Reservation	3:44
4.	"Duel"	Mezcal Head	4:39
5.	"Why Say Yeah"	Swervedriver/Sophia split double 7"	3:13
6.	"Scrawl and Scream"	"Never Lose That Feeling" EP	3:48
7.	"Rave Down"	"Rave Down" EP / Raise	5:08
8.	"How Does It Feel to Look Like Candy?"	Ejector Seat Reservation	3:40
9.	"Blowin' Cool"	Mezcal Head	3:55
10.	"The Other Jesus"	Ejector Seat Reservation	3:11
11.	"Juggernaut Rides"	"Son of Mustang Ford" EP	3:15
12.	"For Seeking Heat"	Mezcal Head	3:38
13.	"These Times"	99th Dream	3:21
14.	"The Hitcher"	A&M 6 track promo / Mezcal Head Remastered and Expanded	3:25
15.	"My Zephyr (Sequel)"	"My Zephyr" single	3:31
16.	"Last Train to Satansville"	Mezcal Head	3:30
17.	"Kill the Superheroes"	"Son of Mustang Ford" EP / Raise Remastered and Expanded	6:03
18.	"Behind the Scenes of the Sounds and the Times"	99th Dream	7:04
19.	"Never Lose That Feeling"	"Never Lose That Feeling" EP / Mezcal Head Remastered and Expanded	4:05

Disc Two
No.	Title	Original Release	Length
1.	"99th Dream"	99th Dream	5:26
2.	"Sandblasted"	"Sandblasted" EP / Raise	4:45
3.	"Maelström"	"Last Day on Earth" single / Ejector Seat Reservation Remastered and Expanded	4:38
4.	"93 Million Miles from the Sun and Counting"	"93 Million Miles From the Sun..." single	3:25
5.	"Ejector Seat Reservation"	Ejector Seat Reservation	5:56
6.	"Over"	previously unreleased / Raise Remastered and Expanded	5:29
7.	"Duress"	Mezcal Head	7:34
8.	"Mars"	"My Zephyr" single	6:23
9.	"Neon Lights Glow"	previously unreleased / Ejector Seat Reservation Remastered and Expanded	7:55
10.	"Sci-Flyer"	Raise	5:06
11.	"Cars Converge on Paris"	A&M 6 track promo / Mezcal Head Remastered and Expanded	6:19
12.	"Deep Seat"	Raise	6:03
13.	"Just Sometimes (Song of Laughter and Forgetting)"	previously unreleased / Ejector Seat Reservation Remastered and Expanded	2:12
14.	"Son of Mustang Ford" (1989 demo)	previously unreleased	7:11

== Personnel ==
- Adam Franklin – guitars, vocals, bass
- Graham Franklin – vocals
- Jimmy Hartridge – guitar, vocals, bass
- Adi Vines – bass
- Paddy Pulzer – drums
- Graham Bonner – drums
- Jez Hindmarsh – drums
- Steve George – bass, vocals

== Sources ==
- Swervedriver discography
- Newspost dated 2-21-05
- Swervedriver - Juggernaut Rides '89-'98
- Allmusic
- Amazon.co.uk
