= Mick Quinn =

English musician, producer and songwriter

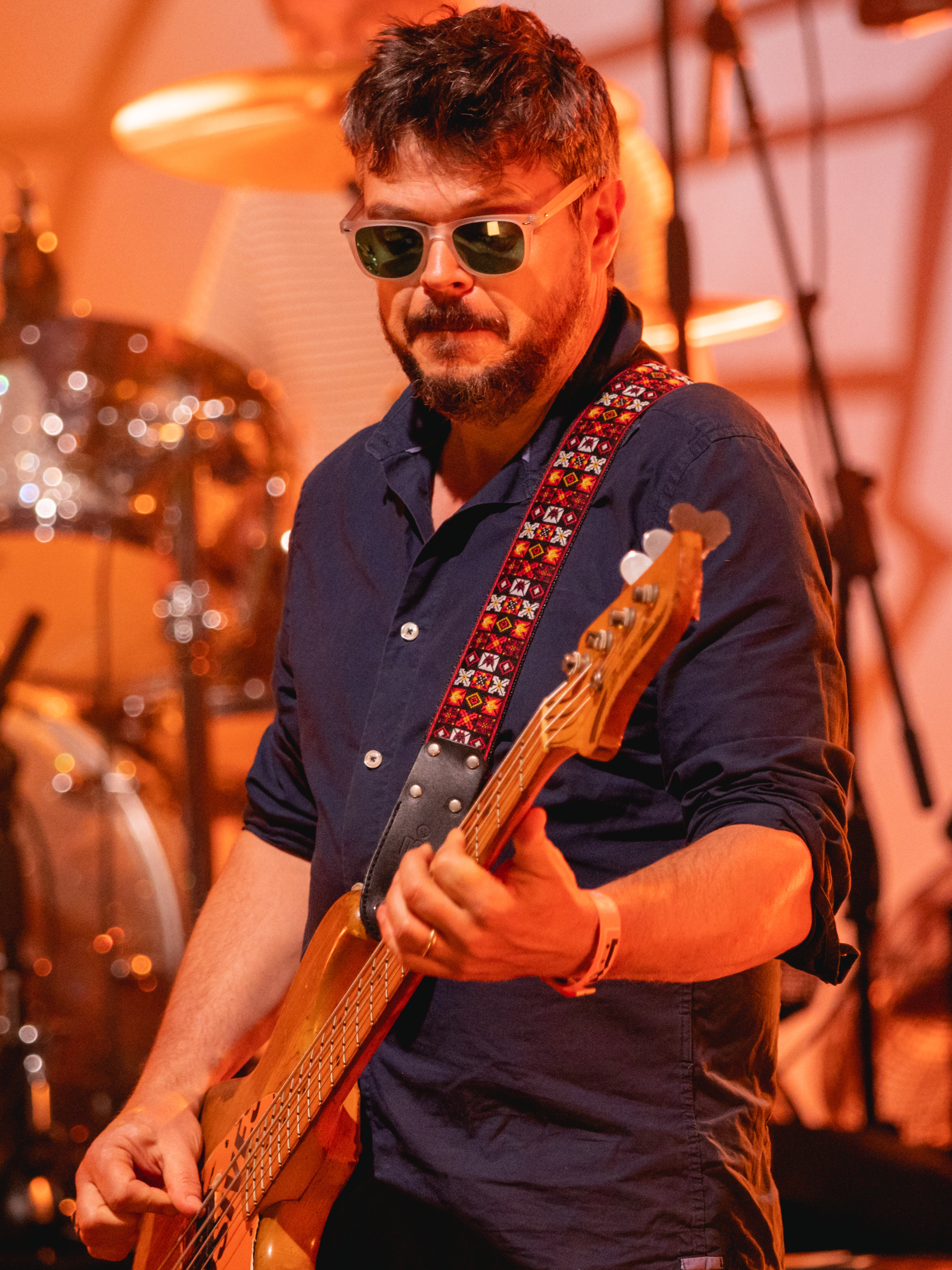
- Quinn performing with Supergrass in 2021

Background information
- Also known as: Biff Hymenn
- Born: Michael Milton Quinn; 17 December 1969 (age 56); Cambridge, England
- Genres: Alternative rock; Britpop
- Occupations: Musician; producer; singer-songwriter
- Instruments: Bass guitar; drums; guitar; harmonica; keyboards; vocals
- Years active: 1993–present
- Label: Dirty Water Records
- Member of: Swervedriver; Supergrass
- Website: www.cotmb.com

Michael Milton Quinn (born 17 December 1969) is an English musician and singer-songwriter. He is best known as founding member of English rock band Supergrass. He is a permanent member of fellow Oxford band Swervedriver.

== Career ==
=== 1984–1993 ===
Mick Quinn started playing bass at the age of 14. A year later moving to guitar. He played with The Asylum in 1986, a band featuring Kid Wig, guitarist with the Beat Seeking Missiles, in and around Oxford including the Port Meadow Festival.

In the late 1980s he became interested in record production, renting and borrowing equipment to experiment with at home. He also travelled to Spain and France to play with local musicians before returning to England in 1992.

=== 1993–2010: Supergrass ===
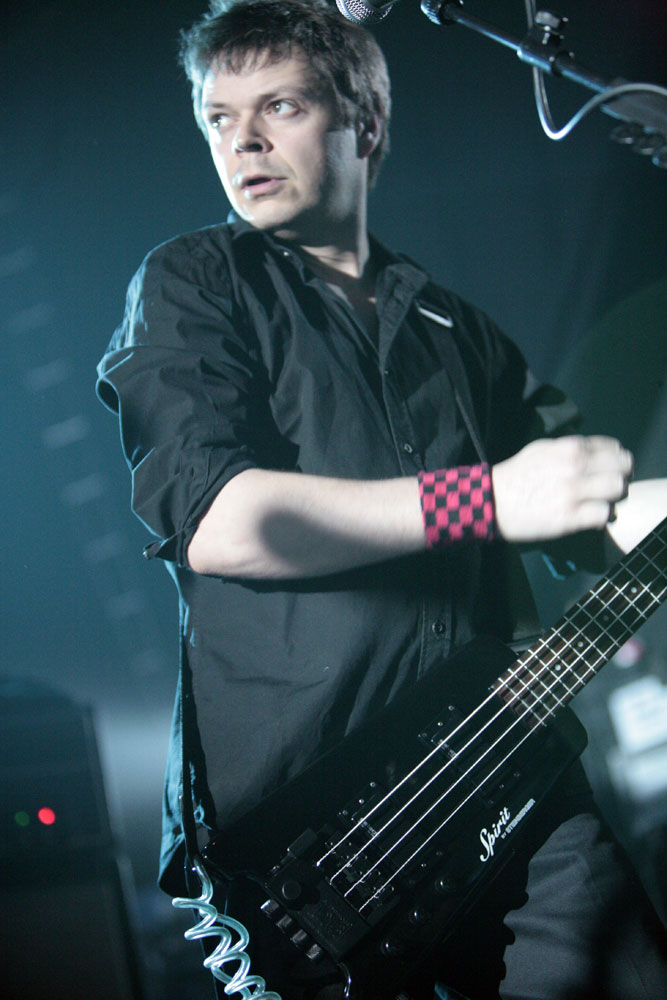
Quinn performing with Supergrass in 2008

Quinn formed Supergrass with Gaz Coombes and Danny Goffey in February 1993. In 1995 the band released I Should Coco selling over a million copies worldwide. Singles, Caught by the Fuzz and Alright confirmed the band's popularity and they went on to release five further albums, four reaching the top ten in the UK Albums Chart.

Children of the Monkey Basket, a website created by Quinn under the name Big Arm Technology was awarded best 'Rock Website' at the UK Online Music Awards in both 2000 and 2002. Other nominations in the category were Coldplay, Idlewild, Radiohead and U2.

In 2008 the band parted ways with Parlophone records, recently acquired by Guy Hands of Terra Firma, and released single Rebel in You on Supergrass Records, overseen by Quinn.

Following the difficulties of recording Release the Drones, the band announced in April 2010 that they were to split.

=== 2010–2014, 2024 - DB Band ===
In May 2010, Quinn formed the DB Band with former Shake Appeal bass player Paul Wilson. Described as heavier and hairier than the 'Grass, they released two EP's, Stranger in the Alps in 2011 and Loosen Up, in 2013.

The band reformed in 2024 with an expanded line up and did a comeback show at The Horn in St Albans as well as a sold out home town gig in Oxford. The band also made appearances at Riverside and Truck in Oxfordshire.

Quinn was also a founding member of garage band The Beat Seeking Missiles with former members of The Wig Outs and Thee Headcoats. Signed to Dirty Water Records, the band released their single, "Break My Fall" / "Dr. Strangelove" in October 2011.

=== 2015–present: Swervedriver ===
During the release of I Wasn't Born to Lose You in 2015, Quinn was tour stand-in for Oxford band and childhood friends Swervedriver. He became a full member of the band during the recording of its follow up, Future Ruins in 2017.

== Personal life ==
Quinn's father is the Australian lipid biochemist Peter Quinn, who is currently based at King's College London. Though born in Cambridge, Quinn spent his very early childhood living in America before relocating to Oxford, England in the 1970s.

On 21 August 2007, Quinn was hospitalized in Toulouse, France for an operation to repair two broken vertebrae and a smashed Calcaneus, sustained after falling out of a first floor window of a rented villa he was staying in with his family. He subsequently made a full recovery, returning to perform with the Diamond Hoo Ha Men in January 2008.

Quinn lives in Oxfordshire with his wife and children.
