= Mansize Rooster =

Single by Supergrass

from the album I Should Coco and Casper: A Spirited Beginning: The Soundtrack
- B-side: "Sitting Up Straight"
- Released: 6 February 1995
- Recorded: Sawmills (Golant, England)
- Length: 2:36
- Label: Parlophone
- Songwriter(s): Supergrass
- Producer(s): Sam Williams

Supergrass singles chronology
| "Caught by the Fuzz" (1994) | "Mansize Rooster" (1995) | "Lose It" (1995) |

Alternative cover
- French version of the single cover

"Mansize Rooster" is a song by English rock band Supergrass, released as the second single from their debut album, I Should Coco (1995). It reached number 20 on the UK Singles Chart, remaining on the chart for three weeks.

Like its predecessor "Caught by the Fuzz", "Mansize Rooster" was originally released in 1994 as a limited-run 7-inch vinyl-only release on Backbeat Records. There were two pressings of 500 copies on Backbeat; the first pressing was on lime green vinyl and the second pressing was on translucent grass-green vinyl. Both sides of the original Backbeat 7" feature the original demo versions and were subsequently re-recorded when the band signed to EMI/Parlophone Records later in 1994.

It was played as Supergrass' first ever live television performance on The Word in 1995. The song is used in the film Casper: A Spirited Beginning and is included in its soundtrack.

== Critical reception ==
Pan-European magazine Music & Media wrote, "Only sporadically does a band cross your path with that special knack to write songs you can whistle along to after hearing just a few bars. Rooted in '60s pop and '70s punk, this lot has got it." Emma Cochrane from Smash Hits gave "Mansize Rooster" four out of five, saying, "Blasting into another floor-stomping, rocking track with searing vocals, Supergrass have all the appearance of a gang of schoolboys who have gleefully discovered that they can write pop songs and get paid for it. They're tipped to become one of this year's "big things", and the 'Grass have all the enthusiasm they need to make it to the top. Judging by this single, they've also got some top tunes to belt out, too. But as for the title..."

== Music video ==
- Director: Dom and Nic

The video (which was filmed on a low-budget) begins with various shots of Gaz Coombes' eyes, ears/sideburns and mouth, then all three of the band are shown with Gaz in the foreground whilst Danny Goffey and Mick Quinn shake their heads wildly behind him. A bathtub in a completely black room is then seen, with the leaves of a potted fern dangling over it; a plug is dropped into the bathtub as it begins to fill up with dyed blue water. Yellow rubber ducks are also later seen in the water. Scenes of the band in an entirely white room playing their instruments, dancing crazily, jumping around in front of a mirror and holding up screens of each other are shown.

By this point all three members of Supergrass are sitting together in the bathtub naked, flicking each other with water and pulling faces. Later on the bathtub lurches forward and speeds off with the band still inside, holding onto the taps for support. At one stage there is use of a clapperboard. During one of the final choruses, Mick and Danny lift a screen up in front of Gaz and he 'transforms' into a woman (in drag with a white-blonde wig, lipstick, a beauty spot and false breasts). The video ends with the band walking in an odd fashion off into the distance as the picture fades out. Throughout the video there is also the occasional use of strobe lighting.

Gaz Coombes uses his red Gibson SG guitar during filming.

== Single artwork ==
The cover artwork, designed by Designers Republic and photographed by Ed Coombes, is a lavish symmetrical pattern, which is slightly cartoon-like. It was commissioned, as the previous ("Caught by the Fuzz") single's artwork was, by the Designers Republic. Coombes, who was responsible for the photography, is in fact another member of the Coombes family. The French version features the band playing Twister on the cover.

== Track listings ==
- CD CDR6402
1. "Mansize Rooster" (2:36)
2. "Sitting Up Straight" (2:19)
3. "Odd?" (4:10): Members of the band can be heard blowing bubbles into a bucket during the outro of this song.
- 7-inch RS6402; limited-edition red 7-inch R6402; cassette TCR6402
1. "Mansize Rooster" (2:36)
2. "Sitting Up Straight" (2:19)
- French CD
1. "Mansize Rooster" (2:34)

== Charts ==
| Chart (1995) | Peak position |
|---|---|
| Scotland (OCC) | 19 |
| UK Singles (OCC) | 20 |
