= Magnetic Morning =

US band

- Origin: New York City, New York, US
- Genres: Indie rock
- Years active: 2006–present
- Labels: DH Records; Friend or Faux Recordings
- Members: Adam Franklin; Sam Fogarino

Magnetic Morning (formerly known as The Setting Suns) is an indie rock duo made up of Swervedriver singer/guitarist and solo artist Adam Franklin and Interpol drummer Sam Fogarino. The two met in early 2006 in New York City when they were introduced over dinner by long term, mutual friend, Jack Rabid and officially formed at the end of 2006.

Magnetic Morning released their debut six-track EP as "The Setting Suns" on iTunes on 18 October 2007. Soon after, they renamed their collaboration after a 2003 song by Franklin's moniker Toshack Highway "due to an already existing entity with a name too close for comfort". A five-track CD version of EP was released through DH Records on 19 April 2008. Magnetic Morning followed with their first full-length album A.M. a little over a year later in January 2009.

== Discography ==
=== The Setting Suns EP ===
==== Details ====
- Released: 18 October 2007
- Label: DH Records / Friend or Faux Recordings
- Format: digital download, CD

==== Track listing ====
All tracks are written by Franklin/Fogarino.

No.	Title	Length
1.	"Cold War Kids"	2:51
2.	"Yesterday's Flowers"	4:47
3.	"The Way Love Used to Be" (The Kinks cover)	3:22
4.	"Don't Go to Dream State"	3:36
5.	"Cold War Kids (Get Claudius)"	5:08
6.	"Cold War Kids (Cole Porter Kids)" (iTunes only)	3:23

=== A.M. ===
==== Details ====
- Released: 27 January 2009
- Label: Friend or Faux
- Format: LP, CD

==== Track listing ====
All tracks are written by Franklin/Fogarino.

No.	Title	Length
1.	"Spring Unseen"	2:02
2.	"At a Crossroads, Passive"	4:21
3.	"Indian Summer"	3:23
4.	"Come Back"	4:48
5.	"No Direction"	3:39
6.	"Motorway"	3:13
7.	"The Wrong Turning"	4:29
8.	"Out in the Streets"	4:29
9.	"And I Wonder"	6:02
10.	"Athens 5"	2:09
