= Last Train to Satansville =

EP by Swervedriver
- Released: 1993
- Recorded: Splatterhouse Studios, Camden
- Genre: Alternative rock; shoegaze; hard rock
- Length: 29:02
- Label: A&M
- Producer: Alan Moulder; Swervedriver

Swervedriver chronology
| Never Lose That Feeling (1992) | Last Train to Satansville (1993) | Space Travel, Rock 'n' Roll (1998) |

Last Train to Satansville is the sixth EP release by English alternative rock band Swervedriver. Produced by Alan Moulder and Swervedriver, the EP was promotionally released in 1993 through A&M Records with a digipak packaging. The lead track "Last Train to Satansville", which was included in the band's second studio album Mezcal Head, was also released as a single in 1994.

The band's cover of The Who song, "In the City", was included in the 1993 tribute album, Who Covers Who?.

== Critical reception ==
Professional ratings
Review scores
| Source | Rating |
|---|---|
| Allmusic | 4/5 stars |

Andy Kellman of Allmusic regarded the tracks "Cars Converge on Paris" as "laggard and mediocre, but benefiting from a Wobble-type bassline and some nifty drum effects," while describing another track "The Hitcher" as "just as ace as anything found on Mezcal Head, including some lovely background vocals." Kellman also wrote that "In the City", a The Who cover, "repletes with vintage Shel Talmy-style production", commenting that "the band turned it into a five-minute, raging charger."

== Track listing ==
All songs written by Swervedriver except the track 6, written by John Entwistle and Keith Moon.

1. "Last Train to Satansville" – 6:45
2. "Last Train to Satansville (Satansville Revisited)" – 6:48
3. "Land of the Lost" – 4:12
4. "Cars Converge on Paris" – 6:27
5. "The Hitcher" – 3:27
6. "In the City" (The Who cover) – 5:23

== Personnel ==
=== Swervedriver ===
- Adam Franklin – vocals, guitar, bass
- Jimmy Hartridge – guitar, bass
- Jez Hindmarsh – drums

=== Other personnel ===
- Alan Moulder – production (1–5); engineering (1–5)
- Nick Addison – engineering (1–5)
- Marc Waterman – mixing (6)
- Jez Hindmarsh – assistant engineering
- Swervedriver – production
