= Happy Campers =

Happy Campers may refer to:

- Happy Camper, an album from Hoodie Allen
- Happy Campers (band), a punk rock band from Las Vegas
- Happy Campers (film), 2001 comedy film starring Brad Renfro and Dominique Swain

== See also ==
- Happy Camp (disambiguation)
- "Unhappy Campers", 2023 episode of Helluva Boss animated series
