= Reel to Real (EP) =

EP by Swervedriver
- Released: 1991
- Genre: Alternative rock, shoegaze
- Length: 17:18
- Label: A&M
- Producer: Swervedriver, Alan Moulder

Swervedriver chronology
Sandblasted (1991)	Reel to Real (1991)	Never Lose That Feeling (1992)

Reel to Real is the fourth EP release by English alternative rock band Swervedriver. Produced and recorded by the band and Alan Moulder, it was promotionally released in 1991, through A&M Records.

== Background ==
The promotional EP features the song "Sandblasted" which was released as a single and included on the EP of the same name. The EP also features a cover of The Velvet Underground song, "Jesus", written by Lou Reed and included on the band's self-titled 1969 album.

== Critical reception ==
Professional ratings
Review scores
Source	Rating
Allmusic	3/5 stars

Andy Kellman of Allmusic described the Velvet Underground cover as "a decent, drums-heavy version" and referred to the acoustic-driven track "Hands," as "another dandy in Swervedriver's arsenal of 'on a motorbike in the middle of nowhere' epics." Kellman also argued that "'Scrawl and Scream' is a slower, slightly twangy version of Rave Down's 'Afterglow' with different lyrics" and deemed that "it's not as effective as its predecessor," while Joe Tangari of Pitchfork described it as "a wicked, steel guitar-soaked headrush."

== Track listing ==
All tracks written by Swervedriver, except "Jesus", written by Lou Reed.

1. "Sandblasted" – 5:41
2. "Scrawl and Scream" – 3:50
3. "(The Watchmakers) Hands" – 3:30
4. "Jesus" (The Velvet Underground cover) – 4:17

== Personnel ==
=== Swervedriver ===
- Adam Franklin – vocals, guitar
- Jimmy Hartridge – guitar
- Adi Vines – bass guitar
- Graham Bonnar – drums

=== Other personnel ===
- Patrick Arbuthnot – pedal steel guitar (2)
- Alan Moulder – production (2); engineering (2); mixing (2, 3)
- Philip Ames – engineering (1, 3)
- Nick Robbins – engineering (4)
- Anjali Dutt – mixing (1)
- Swervedriver – production
