= 33 (Southpacific album) =

EP by Southpacific
- Released: August 15, 1998
- Genre: Space rock post-rock dream pop
- Length: 33:44
- Label: Turnbuckle
- Producer: Graeme Fleming

Southpacific chronology
33 (1998)	Constance (2000)

33 is the common name given to the debut release from Canadian space rock band Southpacific, self-released on August 15, 1998, and later re-released as a promo on Turnbuckle Records and re-pressed in 2000. It was produced by the band's own member, Graeme Fleming.

"33" is a reference to the total time of the record in minutes, as well as to the revolutions per minute at which a full-length vinyl record spins. (However, 33 was not released on vinyl, only on CD.)

== Track listing ==
No.	Title	Length
1.	"Nova"	3:47
2.	"Datura"	4:24
3.	"Life Illusion"	3:02
4.	"Soundbarrier"	5:01
5.	"Interconnect"	3:53
6.	"Time Between"	3:27
7.	"Reverbium"	10:09
