= I Should Coco =

Studio album by Supergrass
- Released: 15 May 1995
- Recorded: February–August 1994
- Studio: Sawmills in Cornwall
- Genre: Punk rock; Britpop; alternative rock; pop-punk
- Length: 40:25
- Label: Parlophone (UK); Capitol (US); Echo/BMG (2018 reissue)
- Producer: Sam Williams

Supergrass chronology
I Should Coco (1995)	In It for the Money (1997)

Singles from I Should Coco
- 1. "Caught by the Fuzz" Released: 17 October 1994; 2. "Mansize Rooster" Released: 6 February 1995; 3. "Lose It" Released: 13 March 1995; 4. "Lenny" Released: 1 May 1995; 5. "Alright" Released: 3 July 1995

I Should Coco is the debut studio album by English alternative rock band Supergrass, released on 15 May 1995 by Parlophone. The title of the album is Cockney rhyming slang for "I should think so".

Supergrass were formed in 1993 by Gaz Coombes, Mick Quinn and Danny Goffey, and they released their debut single, "Caught by the Fuzz", in October 1994 on the small independent local label Backbeat Records. Success of the single brought a major label record deal. I Should Coco was recorded in Cornwall and produced by Sam Williams, who had been impressed by the band while scouting in Oxford. At the height of the Britpop era, the album became the band's most successful release when it reached number one on the UK Albums Chart, and subsequently gained platinum status, selling over a million copies worldwide and 500,000 in the UK. The most successful single released from I Should Coco is "Alright", which peaked at number two on the UK singles chart, and gained platinum status.

== Recording and production ==
Supergrass formed in 1993 after the break-up of The Jennifers and consists of Gaz Coombes (lead vocals), Danny Goffey (drums), Mick Quinn (bass), and Rob Coombes (keyboards). Gaz Coombes, Goffey, and Quinn had been playing gigs around Oxford when they were spotted by producer Sam Williams, who said he wanted to work with them. Between the months of May and August, the band recorded a six track demo at Sawmills Studio and, having signed a deal with Backbeat Records, a limited number of copies of "Caught by the Fuzz" and "Mansize Rooster" were released. The demo had also quickly reached EMI, however, and that led to the group being signed by the Parlophone label, which would re-release the two songs. Quinn said "it took about three and a half months total recording time and cost less to make than the video for Alright."

A recording made at Carfax Tower in Oxford provided the bell chimes heard at the end of "Strange Ones". These chimes were only heard on the I Should Coco version, not on Supergrass Is 10, because on the I Should Coco album the chimes are used as a transition to the next track, "Sitting Up Straight", which was not included in Supergrass Is 10. "Strange Ones" was written about Cowley Road, Oxford, a place where the band once lived. It was originally intended to be the "throwaway song" on the B-side to "Caught by the Fuzz". Another song on the album with the same theme, "I'd Like To Know", was inspired by listening to "Strange Ones" played backwards on tape cassette. Supergrass took this sound, wrote new lyrics for it, and had another song for their album. Gaz Coombes says, "One of the highlights of this album was recording 'Sofa (Of My Lethargy)'. ... I remember everybody got in the live room and had an instrument, including Sam [Williams] on bass, a friend of his on Hammond organ and we played the rest, all live, one take. ... We made I Should Coco so fast because we wanted to catch the energy and excitement of the songs on tape, and do it before the money ran out!" In a 2005 interview with BBC Radio London Quinn remembered "writing that song ['Time'] in my living room on a rainy day and Gaz sort of turned up with this chord sequence and we just went straight through it and just did it on 4 track".

== Cover art and title ==
The album title is Cockney rhyming slang for "I should think so". The front cover of the album is a painting based on three separate photos of Coombes, Goffey, and Quinn. The portraits of Coombes and Goffey were taken by Quinn in the summer of 1994 when he was experimenting with a macro lens. The photo of Quinn was taken that same year by a friend, while they were on tour in Wolverhampton. The painting was then created by the Moody Painters who were based on Oxford's Cowley Road. The white band at the top was inspired by an old Donovan record that Quinn owned and is an homage to old 1950s and 1960s records, with the stereo-mono signs. The photo on the back of the album was taken at a club in London about five minutes after they came off stage. The photo consists of two separate shots grafted together because Quinn was "pulling a disgusting face in the original". All of these elements were then put together by Nick Bax of The Designers Republic to create the finished sleeve. The Bonus 7" featured a more kaleidoscope-style front cover, based on an original 1960's Parlophone paper 'company sleeve'.

== Music ==
"Caught by the Fuzz" (1995)
29 second sample from Supergrass's 1995 single "Caught by the Fuzz".

"Mansize Rooster" (1995)
28 second sample from Supergrass's 1995 single "Mansize Rooster".

"Strange Ones" bell chimes (1995)
22 second sample of the bell chimes used at the end of Supergrass's "Strange Ones".

The group's primary musical influences came from bands such as Buzzcocks, The Jam, Madness and The Kinks. Supergrass took this contemporary music and mixed it with pop-punk's characteristic fast, three-chord, guitar-based, catchy tunes to produce a sound uniquely their own; "we were just the three of us in my bedroom or someone's house, just making ... we played really hard and just made loads of noise. Most of our early songs were just three chord grooves and stuff that was fun to play. So that's why the first album sounded so 'punky', I think ... it's just 'cause we were all used to playing in this small room and it being really loud, so we just made the album sound like that." Songs for Beginners by Graham Nash was another possible influence on I Should Coco. Gaz Coombes told The Guardian in 2003, "We used to listen to it a lot when we lived in Cowley Road in Oxford in 1994, just when the band were getting big."

The musical styles and their particular inspirations for the songs on this album were extremely diverse. For example, there is the cheerful, fast, keyboard-augmented "I'd Like to Know", the guitar-driven punk narrative "Caught by the Fuzz", the mainly piano-based rhythm of the teen anthem "Alright", and the country music-influenced acoustic guitar in "Time to Go". Even in the varied genre of Britpop, I Should Coco was seen as eclectic. Overall, the album has been described as Britpop, influenced in equal parts by Buzzcocks and The Kinks, with strong hints of Supertramp in "She's So Loose", "Lose It" and the intro of "Strange Ones".

In a 1995 interview with Metro, Mick Quinn said, "We listen to a lot of different kinds of music. We're not a '60s-revival band! We like things from the '70s and beyond as well; everything from Sly and the Family Stone and Motown to Frank Black and Tricky."

"Strange Ones" and "I'd Like to Know" are both songs about the strange people on Cowley Road, Oxford. Mick Quinn tried to describe the concept: "There's a few people who are just really out there. There's a lot of people around Oxford who are real spliffheads and that, who go and lie down in Port Meadow, but I'm not really sure about them. I'm not really sure that they're individuals: they're part of a much larger thing." Danny Goffey added, "They're the sort of people who don't fit in anywhere, who don't link up with everyday life at all."

"Caught by the Fuzz" was based on a real-life event: Gaz Coombes's arrest and caution for possession of cannabis aged fifteen. In a 2004 interview, Coombes said "It wasn't trying to be a real statement, but at the time we knew that it was a big deal. Kids all around England were getting nicked for having a bit of hash on them. In Oxford that kind of thing happened quite a lot. It's all true so it was easy to write. It was a funny experience – not too funny at the time 'cause I was only 15 and shitting myself. The song has that disturbing energy. It's comparable to your heart racing. The adrenaline rush you get when your mum walks into the police station is similar to the energy of the song."

"Mansize Rooster" is said to be about a young boy with a large penis, although this is not obvious from the lyrics. Gaz Coombes once stated in an interview that "the most embarrassing moment in pop is on our album where it goes: 'Oi Mum! Got any mandies?'" This was one of the many exclamations made between tracks on I Should Coco in the sped-up voices of the band members. It was said before the song "We're Not Supposed To" began.

== Release and reception ==
Professional ratings
Initial reviews (in 1995)
Review scores
Source	Rating
Chicago Tribune	3.5/4 stars
Entertainment Weekly	A
The Guardian	5/5 stars
NME	9/10
Q	4/5 stars
Rolling Stone	3.5/5 stars
Select	3/5 medals
Smash Hits	4/5 stars
Spin	6/10

Professional ratings
Retrospective reviews (after 1995)
Review scores
Source	Rating
AllMusic	5/5 stars
Mojo	5/5 stars
Record Collector	4/5 stars

I Should Coco reached number one on the UK Albums Chart, stayed there for three weeks, and still remains the only number-one album Supergrass has ever achieved. It sold 500,000 copies domestically, earning Platinum status in the UK, and has sold over a million copies worldwide. NME writer Steve Sutherland gave the album a nine-out-of-ten rating. He wrote, "They play with the skill and assurance of a band who've been going for decades yet they still burn off the buzz of being new to the game." He added, "There's nothing contrived about I Should Coco, nothing added for effect."

Culturally, the album's glorification of teenage freedom made a very big impact on the overall Britpop music scene. The whole genre was seen as the voice of youth, but Supergrass, still teens themselves when the album was made, addressed the subject with more insight than most. The most well-known song from the album, "Alright", is still played regularly in Britain and Ireland, and held up as a musical example of teenage rebellion. Though it is one of their most popular songs, the band rarely play "Alright" in their live sets any more. In a 1999 interview, Gaz Coombes joked, "We don't play 'Alright' anymore. We should play it in a minor key, and in the past tense." Around the time of its release Coombes said that "it wasn't written as an anthem. It isn't supposed to be a rally cry for our generation. The stuff about 'We are young/We run green ...' isn't about being 19 but really 13 or 14 and just discovering girls and drinking. It's meant to be light-hearted and a bit of a laugh, not at all a rebellious call to arms." Danny Goffey noted, "It certainly wasn't written in a very summery vibe. It was written in a cottage where the heating had packed up and we were trying to build fires to keep warm."

All five singles released in the UK from I Should Coco were well received by the British public. The first single from the album, "Caught by the Fuzz", peaked at number 43 on the UK singles chart. The second single from the album, "Mansize Rooster", was played as Supergrass's first live television performance on The Word in 1995, and reached number 20 on the UK singles chart. "Lose It", officially the third single taken from the album, was a vinyl-only US release from Sub Pop. "Lenny" was the fourth single from I Should Coco; it reached number 10 on the UK singles chart, and remained there for four weeks. The final release from the album, "Alright/Time", proved to be their breakthrough single, largely due to the popularity of the song "Alright". Supergrass's highest ranked single to date, along with "Richard III", "Alright" reached number 2 on the UK singles chart, remained in the top three for a month, and still receives airplay in the UK. I Should Coco was nominated for Best Album at the 1995 Mercury Prize awards, and the single "Alright" from the album won an Ivor Novello Award for Best Contemporary Song.

In a 2005 interview with The Times, Coombes said, "It's insane that people think we would ever sound like that again ... We're proud of 'Alright' and how well it did, but we never wanted to find a formula and stick to it. Our aim was always to progress and keep the music interesting, for us and for the fans. So the people who see us in the street and still shout 'We are young' may not like the new album, but fans who have grown up with us and know to expect change probably will."

I Should Coco was included in the book 1001 Albums You Must Hear Before You Die. In a 2007 retrospective review of the album, Al Fox of BBC Music hailed it as "an iconic 90s masterpiece".

== Track listing ==
All tracks are written by Supergrass, unless otherwise noted.

No.	Title	Length
1.	"I'd Like to Know"	4:02
2.	"Caught by the Fuzz"	2:16
3.	"Mansize Rooster"	2:34
4.	"Alright"	3:01
5.	"Lose It"	2:37
6.	"Lenny"	2:42
7.	"Strange Ones"	4:19
8.	"Sitting Up Straight"	2:20
9.	"She's So Loose"	2:59
10.	"We're Not Supposed To"	2:03
11.	"Time"	3:10
12.	"Sofa (of My Lethargy)"	6:18
13.	"Time to Go"	1:56
Total length:		40:25

Limited edition bonus 7"
No.	Title	Writer(s)	Length
1.	"Stone Free" (The Jimi Hendrix Experience cover)	Jimi Hendrix	3:10
2.	"Odd?" (John Peel Session)		5:05
Total length:			48:40

== Personnel ==
Personnel adapted from I Should Coco liner notes, and Sound on Sound.

Supergrass

- Gaz Coombes – vocals, guitar, piano on "Alright" and "Sofa (Of My Lethargy)"
- Danny Goffey – drums
- Mick Quinn – bass, vocals, guitar on "Sofa (Of My Lethargy)"

Additional musicians

- Sam Williams – keyboards, bass on "Sofa (Of My Lethargy)"
- Uncredited musician – Hammond organ on "Sofa (Of My Lethargy)"

Production

- Sam Williams – producer
- John Cornfield – engineer
- The Moody Painters – cover design (illustration)
- The Designers Republic – cover design (sleeve)
- Paul Stanley – photography

== Charts ==
Chart performance for I Should Coco
Chart (1995–1996)	Peak position
Australian Albums (ARIA)	57
Dutch Albums (Album Top 100)	73
European Albums Chart	11
Finnish Albums (Suomen virallinen lista)	32
German Albums (Offizielle Top 100)	70
Icelandic Albums (Tonlist)	12
Irish Albums (IRMA)	7
New Zealand Albums (RMNZ)	20
Swedish Albums (Sverigetopplistan)	36
UK Albums (OCC)	1

== Awards ==
Year	Ceremony	Award	Result
1996	Ivor Novello Awards	Best Contemporary Song ("Alright")	Won
1995	Mercury Prize	Best Album	Nominated
