= Who Covers Who? =

1993 album

Compilation album by various artists
- Released: August 12, 1993 (UK); July 29, 1994 (US)
- Genre: Rock; alternative rock
- Length: 46:26
- Label: Cargo, NMC (UK); Creative Man (US)
- Producer: Guy Fixsen; Joe Viola; Sean Harvey; Whizz Kids

Professional ratings
Review scores
Source	Rating
allmusic	2/5 stars

Who Covers Who? is a tribute album to the rock band the Who. It was released in 1993 in the UK and the following year in the US.

== Track listing ==
1. "I Can See For Miles" – Hyperhead
2. "Pictures of Lily" – Ian McLagan & The Bump Band
3. "The Kids Are Alright" – The Revs, Twickenham's finest,
4. "Bargain" – The Buck Pets
5. "Boris the Spider" – Mint 400
6. "The Good's Gone" – The Telescopes
7. "In the City" – Swervedriver
8. "Anyway, Anyhow, Anywhere" – Alex Chilton
9. "Substitute" – Blur
10. "Baba O'Riley" – Hinnies
11. "Glowgirl" – Mess
12. "The Good's Gone" (Slight reprise) – The Brilliant Corners

== Personnel ==
- Caruzo Fuller – Compiler
- John Yates – Compiler
