= Happy Camp =

Happy Camp may refer to:

== People ==
- John Newbold Camp (1908–1987), American businessman and politician

== Places ==
- Happy Camp, California, Siskiyou County, California, United States
- Fish Camp, California, formerly known as "Happy Camp"

== Film and television ==
- Happy Camp (film), an American horror film
- Happy Camp (TV series), a Chinese variety show

== See also ==
- Happy Campers (disambiguation)
