= Constance (album) =

Studio album by Southpacific
- Released: March 14, 2000
- Recorded: Spring 1999
- Genres: Post-rock, space rock, shoegaze, dream pop, instrumental rock
- Length: 61:36
- Label: Turnbuckle
- Producer: Graeme Fleming

Southpacific chronology
| 33 (1998) | Constance (2000) |

Professional ratings
Review scores
| Source | Rating |
|---|---|
| AllMusic | 2/5 stars |
| Edmonton Journal | 4.5/5 stars |
| PopMatters | 4/10 |

Constance is a full-length album by Canadian post-rock band Southpacific. It followed the band's EP, 33.

Intended to be released in late 1999 (the album has a 1999 copyright date on it), its release date was instead delayed until early 2000. All of its songs are instrumental (except for "Built To Last"), often causing the band to be linked to the post-rock music scene. The group dis-banded after their last show on August 26, 2000, and after completing a tour with Tristan Psionic and Crooked Fingers in support of Constance. The album was released on New York City independent label Turnbuckle Records; the label ceased operations a few years later, causing Southpacific's releases to go out of print.

== Critical reception ==
Exclaim! wrote that "feedback gives way to a low end hum that sometimes pulses subsonically more than it really grooves — although the warm gooey feeling it invokes is the same — and the drift and flow of individual tracks often blends together." CMJ New Music Report wrote that the production turns the "distorted jangle into an evocative blur of shadowy streaks that coast over steady, deliberate percussion." The Houston Press thought that "nothing could be more glorious than a full submersion into Southpacific's surround-sound maelstrom of samples, guitar haze and electronica beats."

== Track listing ==
1. "Blue Lotus" – 4:14
2. "Parallel Lines" – 4:19
3. "E10 @ 182" – 7:11
4. "Alamo" – 3:12
5. "Analogue 9" – 5:33
6. "Round (Forget What You Feel)" – 2:19
7. "Built to Last" – 3:53
8. "A Better Life Since" – 1:49
9. "Stay Ahead, Far Behind" – 5:15
10. "Pintail Gate" – 5:27
11. "Automata" – 3:23
12. "Instrumental" – 5:47
13. "Telegraph Hill" – 4:55
14. "Aria" – 4:13
