= Son of Mustang Ford =

EP by Swervedriver
- Released: 16 July 1990
- Recorded: Greenhouse Studio, London
- Genre: Alternative rock; shoegazing; grunge
- Length: 17:13
- Label: Creation/A&M
- Producer: Swervedriver

Swervedriver chronology
Son of Mustang Ford (1990)	Rave Down (1990)

Son of Mustang Ford is the debut EP by English alternative rock band, Swervedriver. Self-produced by the band, it was released on 16 July 1990 through Creation and A&M Records. The title track of the EP was included in the band's debut album, Raise (1991).

== Background and music ==
Two of the songs, "Son of Mustang Ford" and "Volcano Trash", were composed by Adam Franklin, after his band Shake Appeal disbanded. The band signed to Creation Records, after their demo tape was handed to Alan McGee by Mark Gardener of Ride. The band decided to release a series of four-track EPs over the span of a year, Son of Mustang Ford being the first one. The band recorded and produced the EP at Greenhouse Studios in London.

Franklin stated in NME that the EP "was based on the Fear and Loathing in Las Vegas idea – driving around, out of your box, over America's landscapes." The song "Kill the Superheroes" was composed in an alternate tuning. A music video for "Son of Mustang Ford" was also released. According to music journalist Simon Williams, the band's sound on the EP is "dirtier" than those of the other Creation Records acts, "taking contemporary American guitar rock and instilling it with a liberal dose of languid British dream pop."

== Critical reception ==
Professional ratings
Review scores
Source	Rating
Allmusic	4/5 stars

Andy Kellman of Allmusic wrote: "This EP announced Swervedriver's presence on the shoegaze scene with authority, but with a heavier side that appealed to fans of Loop and the Stooges. Though just as textured and flanged out as any other shoegaze band, with this EP, Swervedriver came across as a band as likely to listen to Black Sabbath as to My Bloody Valentine." He also described the EP as "merely the launching pad" for the band's career. Simon Price of Melody Maker described the release as "a chromium-plated piece of automobile romanticism."

== Track listing ==
1. "Son of Mustang Ford" – 4:19
2. "Volcano Trash" – 3:34
3. "Kill the Superheroes" – 6:05
4. "Juggernaut Rides" – 3:15

== Personnel ==
Swervedriver

- Adam Franklin – vocals, guitar
- Jimmy Hartridge – guitar
- Adi Vines – bass guitar
- Graham Bonnar – drums
