= Caught by the Fuzz =

1994 single by Supergrass

Single by Supergrass

from the album I Should Coco
- B-side: "Strange Ones"; "Caught by the Fuzz" (acoustic)
- Released: 17 October 1994
- Studio: Sawmills (Golant, England)
- Genre: Pop-punk; power pop
- Length: 2:17
- Label: Parlophone
- Songwriters: Gaz Coombes; Danny Goffey; Mick Quinn
- Producers: Sam Williams; John Cornfield

Supergrass singles chronology
"Caught by the Fuzz" (1994)	"Mansize Rooster" (1995)

Official video
- "Caught by the Fuzz" on YouTube

Alternative cover
- Backbeat Records release

"Caught by the Fuzz" is a song by the English Britpop band Supergrass, released in October 1994 by Parlophone as the debut single from their first album, I Should Coco (1995). It was written by Gaz Coombes, Danny Goffey and Mick Quinn, and produced by Sam Williams and John Cornfield. The accompanying music video was directed by Dom and Nic, and made as a montage of footage of the band, both onstage and offstage.

== Background ==
Supergrass had released "Caught by the Fuzz" and "Mansize Rooster" as singles on Backbeat Records, which sold out quickly and gained the interest of record producer Sam Williams, who then offered to record some demos of the band's other songs at Sawmills Studio. These acclaimed demos attracted major label interest, and after an A&R scrutinised gig at the Jericho Tavern in Oxford, they managed to secure a deal with Parlophone.

Despite being a new and obscure band, critics welcomed Supergrass as a voice of youth, in part because they were so young, but also because their music was fresh, exuberant and fast-paced. Even before being signed to a major label "Caught by the Fuzz" it was put at number five on John Peel's Festive 50 of 1994. Although Supergrass had not been around long, they were named Band Of The Month in FHM after only two singles on Parlophone, and were supporting acts such as Blur, the Bluetones and Shed Seven.

== Music and lyrics ==
The song is written around the true-life incident of lead singer Gaz Coombes' arrest and caution for being caught in possession of cannabis (in the U.K. in the 1980s, "blow" was often used as slang for hash) at the age of 15. One of the members of the Seattle rock band Presidents of the United States of America said with regard to "Caught by the Fuzz": "This song is exactly what being a teenager sounds like."

== Versions and release history ==
The single was initially released in August 1994 on Backbeat Records, with a limited number of copies pressed (it is believed that more copies have been pressed since Supergrass signed to Parlophone), on only a 7-inch vinyl format. "Caught by the Fuzz" was on the A-side and "Strange Ones" the B-side. They are, however, both slightly different versions from the ones that can be found on later Parlophone releases). In 1994, before appearing on their debut album, I Should Coco, the song was released on an EP by the Fierce Panda label, entitled Crazed and Confused.

The sleeve cover is a black-and-white caricature of a policeman pointing his finger accusingly, encapsulating the idea of being 'caught by the fuzz'. A mug shot of Hugh Grant was originally intended to be the artwork of the United States single sleeve, but the idea was later dropped after Grant's lawyers complained. There is an unofficially released video for the acoustic version of the song as well, which was filmed in the same fashion as the original video, but uses different footage and adds some scenes of Morris dancers.

== Critical reception ==
Pan-European magazine Music & Media wrote, "Walking on the lawn is a crime against the nation, but these juvenile punks don't care. They're shockproof with a take-it-or-leave-it attitude coupled with truly superb melodies."

== Chart performance ==
The single just missed out on the top 40 of UK Singles Chart by reaching number 43 on the UK Singles Chart, and it failed to chart in the United States. The song was included in John Peel's Festive 50 at number five at the time of its release in 1994. "Caught By the Fuzz" peaked at number 95 on the Australian ARIA Singles Chart in August 1995.

== Music video ==
The music video for "Caught by the Fuzz" is a montage of footage of the band, onstage and offstage, filmed on a Super 8 camera. It was also the first music video directed by Dom and Nic. The video for the single appears in the Beavis & Butthead episode "Sprout" (1996). There is also an alternate version of the music video, which was released in the US using a collage of footage of Supergrass in America instead.

== Live performances ==
On one occasion, Supergrass played "Caught by the Fuzz" on Top of the Pops via satellite. The film pictured Mick Quinn wearing a T-shirt with Hugh Grant's mug shot printed onto it (this was around the time Grant was arrested for lewd conduct with a prostitute). During one performance at Leicester University Ball, Supergrass convinced a real policeman to introduce the song. On a final night of supporting the Foo Fighters in Europe, Taylor Hawkins of the band joined Supergrass to play the drums on "Caught by the Fuzz". In an interview on the DVD accompanying the Supergrass Is 10 compilation, Danny Goffey recalls Hawkins playing the drums "at about 500 miles per hour".

== Formats and track listing ==
- Backbeat 7-inch single
1. "Caught by the Fuzz" (alternate version) – 2:14
2. "Strange Ones" (alternate version) – 3:56
- CD single
1. "Caught by the Fuzz" – 2:17
2. "Strange Ones" – 3:39
3. "Caught by the Fuzz" (acoustic) – 3:02
- 7-inch and cassette single
1. "Caught by the Fuzz" – 2:17
2. "Strange Ones" – 3:39

== Personnel ==
- Gaz Coombes – vocals, guitar
- Danny Goffey – drums
- Mick Quinn – bass guitar

== Charts ==
Weekly chart performance for "Caught by the Fuzz"
Chart (1994)	Peak position
Scottish Singles Sales (Official Charts)	55
UK Singles (Official Charts)	43

Chart (1995)	Peak position
Australia (ARIA)	95

== Release history ==
Region	Date	Format(s)	Label(s)	Ref(s).
United Kingdom	17 October 1994	7-inch vinyl; CD	Parlophone	
Japan	19 April 1995	Mini-CD	EMI	
United States	26 June 1995	Alternative radio	Capitol	
