= Never Lose That Feeling =

EP by Swervedriver
- Released: 18 May 1992
- Recorded: 1992; Greenhouse Studios
- Genre: Alternative rock, shoegaze
- Length: 23:15
- Label: Creation
- Producer: Alan Moulder, Swervedriver

Swervedriver chronology
Reel to Real (1991)	Never Lose That Feeling (1992)	Last Train to Satansville (1993)

Never Lose That Feeling is the fifth EP release by English alternative rock band Swervedriver. Produced by Swervedriver and Alan Moulder, the EP was released on 18 May 1992. The EP is the band's final release with the original lineup. The title track off the EP, which was included on the US edition of the band's second album Mezcal Head (1993), was released as a single in 1992, peaking at number 62 on UK Singles Chart.

== Background ==
After showing an interest for collaborating with the band, engineer and producer Alan Moulder met the band at Greenhouse Studios, where the EP was recorded. Following the recording, the band embarked a North American tour. Drummer Graham Bonnar left the band while touring. After the mixing and the release of the EP, the band continued with the second leg of touring, which ended up with bassist Adi Vines departing the band.

Guitarist Jimmy Hartridge viewed the title track's riff as "a bit of a bridge between Raise and Mezcal Head in some ways."

== Critical reception ==
Professional ratings
Review scores
Source	Rating
Allmusic	3/5 stars

Andy Kellman of Allmusic stated that "the EP is pretty much obsolete for those who own A&M's Reel to Real promo EP."

== Track listing ==
All songs written by Swervedriver.

1. "Never Lose That Feeling/Never Learn" – 11:50
2. "Scrawl and Scream" – 3:50
3. "(The Watchmakers) Hands" – 3:30
4. "Never Lose That Feeling" – 4:05

== Personnel ==
=== Swervedriver ===
- Adam Franklin – vocals, guitar
- Jimmy Hartridge – guitar
- Adi Vines – bass guitar
- Graham Bonnar – drums

=== Other personnel ===
- Patrick Arbuthnot – pedal steel guitar (2)
- Stewart Dace – saxophone (1, 4)
- Alan Moulder – mixing; production (1–2, 4); engineering (1–2, 4)
- Philip Ames – engineering (3)
- Swervedriver – production (3)

== Chart performances ==
Single

Chart (1992)	Peak position
UK Single Charts	67
