= Toshack Highway =

Toshack Highway is the musical group formed by the lead singer and guitarist from Swervedriver, Adam Franklin. The band name derives from merging the surnames of two Liverpool F.C. football players from the 1970s, John Toshack and Steve Heighway.

== History ==
The first full length debut, Toshack Highway and released by Catapult Records in the U.S. and Flower Shop in Europe in 2000, showcased a full band sound of electric keyboards and bubbly Moog synthesizers played through guitar effects pedals over acoustic and electric guitars. Half the record was instrumental, but punctuated by spaceman samples and German language spoken vocals – the other half featured Franklin’s laconic vocal drawl on more conventional folk pop workouts and the album was dubbed 'Spacefolk' by one reviewer.

The second release was an EP of four-track recordings titled Everyday, Rock'n'Roll Is Saving My Life released by Space Baby in 2001, much more a back to basics affair with Franklin on his own playing simple melodic pop songs accompanied by electric and acoustic guitars, shakers, double-tracked vocals and the compression of the tape machine.

Release three was a split CD album with Canadians Sianspheric on their Hamilton, ON label Sonic Unyon entitled Magnetic Morning. Reunited with the drummer and producer of the first eponymous release, this five-song release contains elements of folk, country, psychedelia and in "The Streets That Spin Off" came close to an old Swervedriver theme: ‘songs about cars that rock’.

A fourth download only EP called Birdsong EP was released in April 2006 by the Oxford label, Shifty Disco.

== Members ==
- Adam Franklin (vocals, guitars, songs, instrumentals, keyboards, shakers, kitchen sinks)
- Locksley Taylor (bass, guitar, keyboards, leafs)
- Charlie Francis (production, bass, keyboards, fine cuisine)
- Jeff Townsin (drums, big hair)
- Will Foster (piano, a drink or two)
- Ron Lowder (drums, southern drawl)
- Mike Taylor (piano, sideburns)
- Andrew Lindsay (bass, rye & coke)
- Matt Durrant (drums, falling off drums)

== Discography ==
Year	Details	Notes
2000	Toshack Highway: Released: 11 April 2000; Label: Catapult / Flower Shop; Format: LP, CD	
2001	Everyday, Rock'n'Roll Is Saving My Life EP: Released: 1 October 2001; Label: Space Baby; Format: CD	Includes an acoustic 4-track version of Swervedriver’s "The Hitcher"
2003	Magnetic Morning: Released: 20 May 2003; Label: Sonic Unyon; Format: CD	Double CD split with Sianspheric
2005	Everyday, Rock'n'Roll Is Saving My Life Vol.2: Released: 15 November 2005; Label: Sonic Wave Discs; Format: CD	Compilation of previously unreleased demos and live recordings from 1995-2005
2006	Birdsong EP: Released: 10 February 2006; Label: Shifty Disco; Format: internet download	Contains two versions of "Birdsong", which later appear on Adam Franklin’s debut album Bolts of Melody, and two versions of "Theme from LSD" demo from Everyday, Vol.2
2006	"Syd’s Eyes": Released: 26 September 2006; Label: Black Mountain Music; Format: 7" single	Includes the B-side "Silver Freight Train"
