= Space Travel, Rock 'n' Roll =

EP by Swervedriver
- Released: 10 February 1998
- Recorded: Bad Earth, London
- Genre: Rock
- Length: 15:44
- Label: Zero Hour; Shock; Sonic Wave Discs
- Producer: Swervedriver

Swervedriver chronology
Last Train to Satansville (1993)	Space Travel, Rock 'n' Roll (1998)

Space Travel, Rock 'n' Roll is the seventh and final EP release by English alternative rock band Swervedriver. It was released on 10 February 1998 through Zero Hour, Shock Records, and Sonic Wave Discs record labels. The EP was released with the single format in Australia.

Drummer Jez Hindmarsh's first experimentation with drum looping is showcased on the track "Good Ships". The EP also features an edited version of "99th Dream", the title track of the band's fourth studio album, 99th Dream (1998). The track features lyrics that quote from the Electric Prunes and the Psychedelic Furs.

== Critical reception ==
Professional ratings
Review scores
Source	Rating
Allmusic	4/5 stars

Allmusic critic Tim Sendra praised the EP, stating: "The Space Travel, Rock 'n' Roll EP is proof that the band never wavered and was great until the very end." Sendra described the track "Good Ships" as an "impossibly moody space ballad" and compared the country-indebted track "Hate Your Kind" to Steve Miller's "Space Cowboy". Nevertheless, he also felt that the track "Stimulani" is "as close as the band ever got to filler, just simple chords repeated over and over with increasing volume and intensity."

== Track listing ==
All songs are written by Swervedriver.

1. "99th Dream (edit)" — 3:41
2. "Good Ships" — 4:32
3. "Hate Yr Kind" — 4:04
4. "Stimulini" — 3:27

== Personnel ==
Swervedriver

- Adam Franklin – vocals, guitar
- Jimmy Hartridge – guitar
- Steve George – bass; engineering (2, 4)
- Jez Hindmarsh – drums; engineering (1, 3)

Other personnel

- Dick Meaney – engineering (1, 3)
- Nick Addison – engineering (1, 3)
- Paul Watson – artwork, design
- Swervedriver – production
