= Southpacific =

- Also known as: SoPac
- Origin: Ottawa, Ontario, Canada
- Genres: Post-rock, shoegaze, space rock, dream pop, instrumental rock
- Years active: 1997–2000, 2020–present
- Labels: Turnbuckle; Symbiotic
- Members: Graeme Fleming; Joachim Toelke; Phil Stewart-Bowes
- Website: southpacific.ca

Southpacific (colloquially, "SoPac") is a Canadian post-rock/space rock band with prominent shoegaze leanings, originally based in Ottawa. Southpacific's guitar-oriented music is generally psychedelic in nature and filled with reverb, yet at times contains sheets of noise and heavy drumming.

== History ==
Southpacific's members are multi-instrumentalists Joachim Toelke (primarily electric guitar), Graeme Fleming (primarily drums/percussion), and Phil Stewart-Bowes (primarily bass guitar). The trio formed in 1997, began playing live in 1998, and went on to release two recordings on the Turnbuckle label.

Their self-titled 1998 EP/mini album (also known as 33) was supposedly recorded in a ski chalet. Southpacific soon relocated to the more musically-fertile community of Toronto. Full-length album Constance was recorded in early to mid-1999, and made it to stores in early 2000. The band never released any singles. The music was highly recording studio-intensive, using many layers of guitar tracks and subtle samples to create a dense overall sound. Only one of the band's songs ("Built To Last") had vocals.

They performed at the 1999 Canadian Music Week Festival, and embarked on a cross-Canada tour with indie rockers Tristan Psionic and Crooked Fingers between April and May 2000. The band's last performance was on August 26, 2000, with shoegaze band SIANspheric.

Southpacific released Depths, their first track since the disbandment in 2000, digitally on February 21, 2020.

In February 2023, the band released an EP, Radar Road, that was recorded in Toelke’s basement and produced by Fleming.

== Post-breakup ==
After disbanding in August 2000, Toelke focused on an experimental recording project entitled Frihavn, which created a demo CD. Turnbuckle Records soon folded, leaving Southpacific's albums both out of print. Fleming and Stewart-Bowes are both currently residing in Toronto, while Toelke has been living in Europe since 2003.

== Discography ==
=== Albums ===
- Constance - Turnbuckle 2000

=== EPs/Mini-albums ===
- 33 - self-released on 15 August 1998; promo release (green cover) on Turnbuckle, 1999; re-pressed (purple cover) in 2000
- Radar Road - 2023

=== Singles ===
- Depths - 2020
