= Mezcal Head =

Studio album by Swervedriver
- Released: 27 September 1993
- Studio: Trident 2; Famous Castle; First Protocol; Splatterhouse; Broadwater Farm
- Genre: Alternative rock; shoegaze; grunge
- Length: 48:58
- Label: Creation
- Producer: Alan Moulder; Swervedriver

Swervedriver chronology
Raise (1991)	Mezcal Head (1993)	Ejector Seat Reservation (1995)

Singles from Mezcal Head
- 1. "Duel" Released: 2 August 1993; 2. "For Seeking Heat"/"Blowin' Cool" Released: 1993; 3. "Last Train to Satansville" Released: 1993

Mezcal Head is the second studio album by English alternative rock band Swervedriver. It was released on 27 September 1993 by Creation Records in the United Kingdom and on 5 October 1993 by A&M Records in the United States.

== Background and release ==
In 1993, Swervedriver re-emerged with the core of Adam Franklin and Jimmy Hartridge, along with newly recruited drummer Jez Hindmarsh (a.k.a. "Jez"), and released Mezcal Head. The album gave them their most successful UK single at number 60, "Duel", which NME named its "single of the week" and for which a music video was released. Franklin and Hartridge both perform bass on the album, as they were left without a bassist when Adi Vines departed before recording began.

"Never Lose That Feeling", from the 1992 EP of the same name, and the extended instrumental "Never Learn" were added as a single bonus track to the US edition of the CD. Swervedriver toured US arenas with The Smashing Pumpkins and Shudder to Think in October and November 1993.

== Reception ==
Professional ratings
Review scores
Source	Rating
AllMusic	4.5/5 stars
The A.V. Club	A
Blurt	8/10
Entertainment Weekly	B
Mojo	4/5 stars
NME	8/10
Pitchfork	8.0/10
PopMatters	9/10
Q	3/5 stars
Spectrum Culture	4.5/5

Alternative Press ranked Mezcal Head at numbers 39 and 90 on its "90 Greatest Albums of the '90s" and "Top 99 of '85–'95" lists respectively. It was also ranked at number 265 on Spin's "The 300 Best Albums of the Past 30 Years (1985–2014)" list. Pitchfork ranked the album at number 10 on its list of "The 50 Best Shoegaze Albums of All Time" in 2016.

== Track listing ==
All tracks are written by Swervedriver, except where noted.

No.	Title	Length
1.	"For Seeking Heat"	3:48
2.	"Duel"	6:19
3.	"Blowin' Cool"	3:55
4.	"MM Abduction"	2:51
5.	"Last Train to Satansville"	6:45
6.	"Harry & Maggie (Dragging It Under)"	5:27
7.	"A Change Is Gonna Come"	4:01
8.	"Girl on a Motorbike"	4:09
9.	"Duress" (Swervedriver, Marc Waterman)	8:03
10.	"You Find It Everywhere"	4:10

US edition bonus track
No.	Title	Length
11.	"Never Lose That Feeling/Never Learn"	11:51

Japanese edition bonus tracks
No.	Title	Length
11.	"Planes Over the Skyline"	4:41
12.	"Year of the Girl"	5:24

2008 reissue bonus tracks
No.	Title	Length
11.	"Never Lose That Feeling/Never Learn" (mislabeled as "Never Lose That Feeling")	11:51
12.	"Planes Over the Skyline"	5:24
13.	"Hitcher"	3:27
14.	"Cars Converge on Paris"	6:31

== More information ==
The UK CD has "Mickey" and "Dragging It Under" printed on the CD as tracks 4 and 6. The US CD has "Harry and Maggie (Dragging It Under)" printed on the CD as track 6. The US promo is identical to the official release except that it has the word "PROMOTIONAL" printed on the CD. The Japanese edition comes with a biography and lyrics.

The tracks "Duel" and "Last Train to Satansville" were featured in the Sega Saturn, Sony PlayStation and 3DO versions of the game Road Rash.

"Duel" was featured in the 1994 video game Road Rash and in the 2008 video game Burnout Paradise. "Mezcal" is censored from the song's album listing in the game due to connotations with alcoholic beverages.

== Personnel ==
Credits for Mezcal Head adapted from liner notes.

Swervedriver

- Adam Franklin – vocals, guitar
- Jimmy Hartridge – guitar
- Jez Hindmarsh – drums, percussion
- Adi Vines – bass on "Never Lose That Feeling/Never Learn"
- Graham Bonnar – drums on "Never Lose That Feeling/Never Learn"

Additional musician

- Stewart Dace – saxophone on "Never Lose That Feeling/Never Learn"

Production

- Swervedriver – production
- Alan Moulder – production, mixing, engineering
- Nick Addison – engineering
- Jez Hindmarsh – engineering
- Ronan Keating – engineering assistant
- Howie Weinberg – mastering

Design

- Andy Vella – cover art

== Charts ==
Chart (1993)	Peak position
UK Albums (OCC)	55
