= Swervedriver =

English alternative rock band

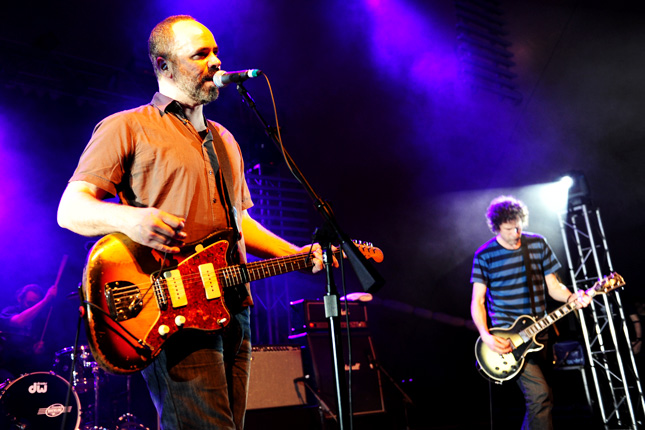
- Swervedriver performing at the Perth International Arts Festival, 2011. From left to right: Graham Bonnar, Adam Franklin, and Jimmy Hartridge.

Background information
- Origin: Oxford, England
- Genres: Shoegaze; alternative rock; dream pop; grunge
- Years active: 1989–1998, 2008–present
- Labels: Creation; A&M; Shock; Sony Music Entertainment; DGC; Zero Hour; Sonic Wave Discs; Second Motion; Hi-Speed Soul; Tym; Dine Alone; Cobraside; Dangerbird
- Members: Adam Franklin; Jimmy Hartridge; Mikey Jones; Mick Quinn
- Past members: Adi Vines; Graham Bonnar; Dan Davis; Danny Ingram; Jez Hindmarsh; Steve George
- Website: swervedriver.com

Swervedriver are an English alternative rock band formed in Oxford in 1989 around core members Adam Franklin and Jimmy Hartridge. Between 1989 and 1998, the band released four studio albums and numerous EPs and singles despite a considerable flux of members, managers, and record labels. By 1993 the band's lineup had settled with Franklin on vocals/guitar, Hartridge on guitar, Jez Hindmarsh on drums, and Steve George on bass. They had emerged with a heavier rock sound than their shoegaze contemporaries, and over the next five years it evolved to include elements of psychedelia, classic pop, and indie rock.

Record label issues and waning interest within the group led to their split at the end of 1998. A decade later, Swervedriver reunited and toured periodically over the next five years, releasing their first new material in fifteen years with the 2013 single "Deep Wound". They have since released two full-length albums, I Wasn't Born to Lose You in 2015 and Future Ruins in 2019, with touring stand-ins drummer Mikey Jones and bassist Mick Quinn permanently joining the band.

== History ==
=== Early years (1984–1989) ===
Swervedriver have their roots in Oxford when schoolmates and aspiring guitarists Franklin and Hartridge along with Franklin's older brother and vocalist, Graham, and drummer Paddy Pulzer formed the band Shake Appeal in 1984. In 1987, bass player Adrian "Adi" Vines, from Yorkshire, joined the band, and the following year they released their solitary single "Gimme Fever" through Notown Records. Shake Appeal were influenced by late '60s garage rock bands like The Stooges and MC5, drawing similar influences from the sights and sounds of the British Leyland car factory Franklin and Hartridge walked past every day on the way to school. When influence turned to emulation, the members felt they needed to develop a sound of their own. They had meanwhile turned their attention to American alternative rock acts Hüsker Dü, Sonic Youth, and Dinosaur Jr., and subsequently were inspired "to push out the boundaries of electric guitar within a pop format."

In 1989, after Shake Appeal disbanded, Adam Franklin composed the songs "Volcano Trash", "Afterglow", and "Son of Mustang Ford" (which would become Swerverdriver's first single). The former bandmates were impressed with his work and assembled at Union Street Studios in Oxford to record a demo, with Adam Franklin shifting to lead vocals and his brother singing backup. Soon thereafter, Graham Franklin and Pulzer left the band to pursue other musical interests. Growing tired of the local scene, the group had decided to head to London, and there they met drummer and Edinburgh-native Graham Bonnar, formerly of the post-punk band The Shattered Family. Before leaving Oxford, they had handed their demo to Mark Gardener of local band Ride, who in turn passed it on to Alan McGee of Creation Records. McGee signed them almost immediately after listening to the tape (while riding around downtown Los Angeles in the back of a limousine) and Swervedriver was born.

=== Debut EPs, Raise, and departures (1990–1992) ===
"Rave Down"
Sample of "Rave Down" from the Rave Down EP (1990) demonstrating Hartridge's metallic guitar riffs and Bonnar's prominent rhythm, which set Swervedriver apart from other acts of Oxford's shoegazing scene.

Instead of debuting with a full-length album, Swervedriver released a series of four-track EPs over the span of a year, subscribing to the popular trend in the early '90s. "If you had 4 songs ready-ish, you would record them there and then and put them all out ASAP. No such thing as 'saving songs for the album' back then," explained Hartridge. The tracks were recorded at The Greenhouse & Falconer Studios in London and were all produced by the band. Swervedriver's debut offering, Son of Mustang Ford, was released on 16 July 1990 and included the song "Kill the Superheroes", one of Franklin's first attempts at writing in an alternate tuning. Franklin stated in NME, "Son of Mustang Ford was based on the Fear and Loathing in Las Vegas idea – driving around, out of your box, over America's landscapes." The EP was characterized as "a chromium-plated piece of automobile romanticism." The group launched the release with an appearance on the John Peel BBC Radio 1 show on 31 July 1990, performing a select B-side from each of their three debut EPs along with the song "Over" (which would not see an official release for 15 years). The release of Rave Down, the second EP in the series, followed in November. Mary Anne Hobbs called its title track "a cyclone of wild, swollen riff machinery that sounds like it's been played with dislocated shoulder joints." Both EPs received favorable reviews and their title singles made their way into the UK indie and metal charts. However, mainstream British music press soon shifted their focus to bands who fit easier into the shoegazer mould. The group began gaining popularity in the United States, and in early 1991 Swervedriver signed with American label A&M Records and went on their first US tour, a brief run of shows in support of Ned's Atomic Dustbin that kicked off at the Marquee in New York City. On 22 July 1991, their third EP, Sandblasted, was released with the title single reaching number 67 on the UK chart and being described as "a head-on collision between guitars raging for chaos."

Swervedriver released their debut album, Raise, on 30 September 1991. It was recorded at The Greenhouse & Falconer Studios and produced by the band, like their prior EPs, and included the title tracks from all three. Regarding the group's overriding fascination with everything automotive, Franklin had said, "the car thing came from twisting around rock 'n' roll imagery. Chuck Berry used to sing about cars. T. Rex used to sing about cars, and being in the car is just a good place to hear music." The album was praised as "incurably romantic, [getting] its rocks off" as one of the "truly great albums made this year" and charted 44th in the UK. Swervedriver toured the UK extensively in support of the album and was invited to a second BBC Radio 1 session on 23 November 1991. Producer Alan Moulder, who had worked with fellow Creation acts The Jesus and Mary Chain and My Bloody Valentine, introduced himself to Franklin at a bar at the University of North London's ULU music venue with the interest of working together. Moulder met the band at Greenhouse studios and there they recorded Never Lose That Feeling, Swervedriver's fourth EP, which featured the Raise outtake "The Watchmakers Hands" and the track "Scrawl and Scream", a slowed-down reworking of "Afterglow".

"Never Lose That Feeling/Never Learn"
Sample of "Never Lose That Feeling/Never Learn" from the Never Lose That Feeling EP (1992), showing the band's expanding use of melody and Moulder's improved production.

Swervedriver then embarked on a proper headlining tour of North America with American indie rock act Poster Children opening. On 6 February 1992, while waiting to cross the Canada–US border for a show in Toronto, Bonnar left the tour bus to "go get a sandwich" and did not come back. Despite having fully intended to complete the tour, artistic differences between band members made it impossible for him to continue. After he spoke to Hartridge, Bonnar told him he wanted out of the band. Dan Davis from Run Westy Run filled in for the next five dates, and then tour manager Phil Ames called on Danny Ingram from Washington, D.C. band Strange Boutique to finish the tour. The group, with Ingram in tow, returned to the US in April 1992 to support A&M label mates Monster Magnet and Soundgarden and then performed a short stint in Japan. Before departing on their second leg, they had mixed Never Lose That Feeling which was released on 18 May 1992; the Moulder production would be Swervedriver's final release with the original lineup. Hartridge viewed the title track's riff as "a bit of a bridge between Raise and Mezcal Head in some ways" and the song would reach number 62 on the UK charts. Using footage from their first leg of touring, A&M representatives Jeff Suhy and Scott Carter produced the video On the Road with Swervedriver: A Rockumentary, which also featured interviews and the music videos for "Son of Mustang Ford" and "Sandblasted", and released it on 14 May 1992. Just as they started to experience a rise in success, Swervedriver would hit another roadblock—in addition to them losing their manager, following a performance at the Hultsfred Festival in Sweden on 8 August 1992, Vines left to form heavy metal-oriented Skyscraper. Having already suffered the loss of Bonnar, the loss of Vines, whom some considered the face of the band, led music press to believe it would be difficult, if not impossible, for the band to sustain their momentum.

=== Mezcal Head and new lineup (1993–1994) ===
Ultimately all that remained of the band according to Franklin was, "myself, Jimmy Hartridge and some effects pedals", though Moulder still anticipated producing a full-length Swervedriver album. Franklin and Hartridge laid the groundwork for a new album at EMI's demoing studio near Oxford Street in London, and while recording newly written "Duress" with producer Marc Waterman, he introduced them to Jeremy "Jez" Hindmarsh, ex-drummer of the London band 5:30. (Waterman had produced their first album.) Later that night, Hindmarsh approached the duo at The Murray Arms bar in Camden Town and pitched them his services, including use of his 16-track studio equipment. They accepted and Swervedriver had their new drummer. The group got to work on recording their new album first at Playground rehearsal studios in Camden and then Trident 2 studios in Strutton Ground in Westminster, with Franklin and Hartridge splitting bass duties. Swervedriver would still need a bassist when the show hit the road, and Franklin would encounter him at another bar in Camden. About meeting Essex-native Steve George, Franklin recalled, "He actually came up to me and said, 'You're the guy from Swervedriver. You need a bass player. I'm your man.'"

On 12 August 1993, the band released their second album, Mezcal Head, produced by Alan Moulder and Swervedriver. Franklin and Hartridge credited Moulder for making the album sound "big and clear" and doing "way more for us than we had hoped for." The album debuted at number 55 in the UK and was critically acclaimed—NME asserted, "you are defied not to sit back, ride its massive cadences, revel in its classical form and sleek lines, and... fall helplessly in love." Later reviews praised it "combined the best elements of shoegazing with grunge and even American indie rock" and "really is the lost classic of the shoegaze movement." Its first single, "Duel", garnered both NME's and Melody Maker's "Single of the Week" and hit number 60 on the UK chart (their highest charting single to date). The band shot two videos for the single: a self-produced snowboarding excursion at Mount Hood and a big-budget MTV effort set in downtown Los Angeles, which included new bassist George. Swervedriver set off touring for the album in the UK and then moved to North America in late 1993 to join Shudder to Think and the Smashing Pumpkins, solidifying a strong American following in the process.

"Last Train to Satansville"
Sample of "Last Train to Satansville", the second single from Mezcal Head (1993). This clip showcases Franklin's stream-of-consciousness lyrical style and the multi-layered sound of Hindmarsh's drumming.

In early 1994 the album's second single, "Last Train to Satansville", was released. Critics and fans alike were drawn to Hindmarsh's deeper, harder-hitting drumming and Franklin's stream-of-consciousness narrative, describing it as "the height of alt-rock badassery ... with a monster guitar riff and chunky rhythm" and a "menacing spaghetti western bite." The single, along with "Duel", would be featured with songs from other A&M artists in the video game Road Rash for the 3DO system. Meanwhile, the group continued touring with fellow Creation act Medicine in Europe, Australia, and Japan. Later that year Swervedriver would put out their first single with George on bass, the "limited edition export series, deleted on day of release" 8-track recording, "My Zephyr", on boutique label The Flower Shop.

=== Ejector Seat Reservation and label troubles (1995) ===
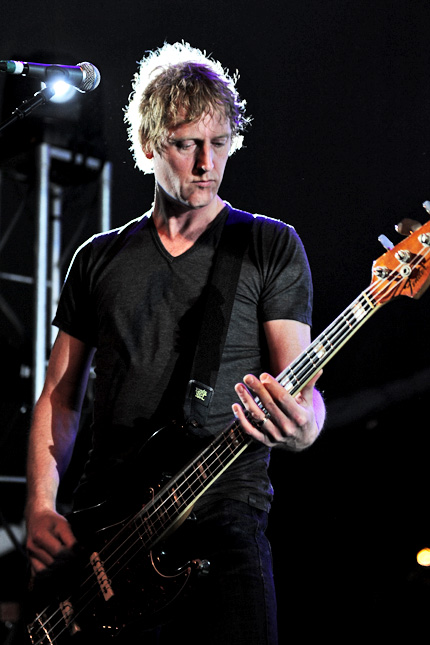
Bassist Steve George performing with Swervedriver in 2011

Swervedriver's third album, Ejector Seat Reservation, was recorded primarily at Church Studios and Konk Studios in Crouch End, North London and again produced by the band and Alan Moulder. Aside from themes of fatalism and flight working their way into its composition, "for some reason we were wanting to reverse the notion of being the band with the American references in our songs and so some very British reference points appeared in the lyrics," explained Franklin. The band had a dispute with McGee over picking the album's launching single—they thought "The Other Jesus" was the obvious choice but McGee overrode them, selecting "Last Day on Earth" in an attempt to capitalize on the current trend perpetuated by Britpop bands like Oasis of featuring strings and acoustic guitars. Initial promo pressings of the record including the additional track "It's All Happening Now" had to be withdrawn after permission to use lyrics lifted from Bob Dylan's "It's All Over Now, Baby Blue" was denied. (They would later be given away to fan club members.) These incidents would prove to be just a precursor to the group's album woes, however. Realizing a vanishing return on their investment, American label A&M cut the band's funding, telling them the album would not fit into their release schedule for another year and a half. In response, the group requested to be released from their contract. With its loss of the band's licensing to A&M (approximately US$350,000 per album), an already financially troubled Creation released Ejector Seat Reservation domestically on 15 July 1995 but dropped the band a week later. Subsequently, it received no promotional support (aside from a few small ads) and would remain unreleased in North America.

"The Birds"
Sample of "The Birds" from Ejector Seat Reservation (1995) demonstrating Swervedriver's incorporation of classic pop influences and George's deep bass lines.

Ejector Seat Reservation did get some press in mainland Europe (specifically France and Germany) and received significant support from licensee Sony Music in Australia, including an invitation for the group to tour the country at the end of the year, but that did not prevent it from becoming Swervedriver's poorest selling album. Despite its lack of commercial success, critics have considered Ejector Seat Reservation to be the band's highest achievement. Andy Kellman of AllMusic crowned it their "most cohesive and concise record, best experienced in whole," which "Swervedriver effortlessly committed ... as if they had it in them all along." Magnet magazine's Gil Gershman complimented it as the "work of artists enjoying a towering creative high" that "should have topped every chart and won legions over to the Swervedriver cause." With the addition of George's deep grooves to the mix, melodic efforts like "The Birds", "How Does It Feel to Look Like Candy?", and "Last Day on Earth" saw Swervedriver branching out from their metallic roots and demonstrating their expanding influences in the likes of Elvis Costello, Burt Bacharach, and T. Rex.

=== 99th Dream and breakup (1996–1998) ===
Swervedriver appeared to rebound when they signed a three-album deal with DGC Records (a subsidiary of Geffen Records) in early 1996. Originally, the first album in the deal was to be an American release of Ejector Seat Reservation; the band had attempted to talk A&M into relinquishing them the rights, but after news of their talks with Geffen was publicized on the Internet, A&M had come back with an exorbitant price for its sale (to avoid the same missed opportunity after previously dropped Soul Asylum hit it big with 1992's Grave Dancers Union). With their advance, they finished building their own recording studio, Bad Earth in Farringdon, and instead began work on a new record for the label. Over the next year, the group would record 99th Dream with Moulder at the helm, this time taking a more simple, laid-back approach than with previous productions. They scaled back from 48-track to 24-track recording, condensing the layering of guitar in the process, and employed more full-ensemble straight live track, partly with the mindset of making it easier to play the guitar lines live. During that time, the band also put out a pair of self-produced boutique label seven-inch singles, including the double split "Why Say Yeah" with indie collaboration act Sophia. DGC distributed promotional copies of the album and scheduled a release date of 7 May 1997. Meanwhile, in December 1996 Swervedriver went back into the studio and re-recorded the album track "These Times," citing their growing dislike for the original's faster-paced, Oasis-like sound and a bad experience with one of the label's reps during mixing. Three and a half weeks before 99th Dream was due to be released, DGC dismissed the band's A&R representative, Jody Kurilla, in a corporate downsizing and three hours later terminated their contract (though they would not impede the record's future release). Considering the recent break with their third label in two years, Hindmarsh stated, "Someone from A&M once told us that it takes four or five listens to a Swervedriver album to see whether you like it or not, and in this marketplace, unless you can hit immediately it's not going to register with people."

"These Times"
Sample of "These Times", the third single from 99th Dream (1998). This segment exemplifies the album's more laid-back rhythms and Swervedriver's move towards an indie rock sound.

Still determined to get the album out, Swervedriver forwent signing with one of two other interested major labels and instead opted for independent label Zero Hour Records out of New York. They officially released 99th Dream, their fourth album, on 24 February 1998. The band also formed their own label, Sonic Wave Discs (SWD), and on 10 August 1998 issued the album in the UK. About the album's progression to a more indie rock style, Franklin told The Star-Ledger, "It wasn't a conscious decision. [It was] just the way it was going – concise little pop songs, bossa nova beats and such." He continued, "I've always liked the idea that you don't always know where it's coming from... [The lyrics are] all about time. It's all over the place. I didn't put too much thought into it, which may be good. You're fueling more from the subconscious that way." In an interview for Mean Street magazine, Hindmarsh mentioned, "There's a track called 'She Weaves a Tender Trap.' That's like a one-take, all-four-of-us thing, and it has a lot more air in it, a lot more space. Whereas in the past, we used to try and fill every single hole. That song sort of defines a change in the way we're thinking. I think we're headed that way, to leave space to let the music breathe a little bit."

Reviews of the album were mixed, mainly around the band's shift from the heavier, multi-layered composition of previous releases to a more acoustic, song-based sound that at times seemed disjointed. "Though the weakest of Swervedriver's four long-players of the '90s, 99th Dream still shimmers and sizzles like the work of shamefully few bands of the time," asserted Andy Kellman of AllMusic. Tom Sinclair of Entertainment Weekly concurred: "The sheer heaviness of the old Swervies is much missed, but even on cruise control the band has a singular intensity, not to mention a sharp sense of songcraft." Proponents of the release maintained it "mixes the tempos up with equal parts 'Brit' to 'rock,' blending into a nice mix" and "never makes grandiose rock and roll promises, only to let the listener down later." Yet, not all reviews were favorable; NME lambasted the effort as an attempt "to bung some lazy-eyed melody swoons, Mexican twangs and comatose rock-outs over the trademark billowing whale flatulence," and Drop-D Magazine opined, "The slow, druggy pace and fascination with their own weird noises work against them."

Swervedriver would spend the rest of the year touring extensively for the album. The band performed a promo gig opening for Hum on 26 February 1998 at Irving Plaza in New York and kicked off a North American stint in late May with acts such as Sianspheric, The Dandy Warhols, and Beck. The tour swung to the UK at the end of July, and discussions started within the band about a break: "it cropped up – 'Is this fun? Are we having fun doing this?' I guess we kind of weren't," spoke Franklin in a 2011 interview. They ultimately decided to keep going until the end of the year, honoring their touring commitments, and then according to Franklin, "take a bit of a time out... although it did seem like the end, to me." The group returned to the US to headline a nine-show club tour in the Northeast; they immediately followed with a wide-ranging Australian tour opening for Powderfinger, with their last show taking place at Bootleg Brewery in Margaret River near Perth on 13 December 1998.

That year also saw the release of two more works through Swervedriver's personal label. The EP Space Travel, Rock 'n' Roll, released on 10 February 1998 as an Australian single, showcased Hindmarsh's first experimentation with looping. The 6 July 1998 single "Wrong Treats" ("These Times" in Australia) would be the band's last offering before their ultimate hiatus and featured the instrumental "Homeless Homecoming", a recording begun during a soundcheck at the Metro Club in Sydney, and a cover of T. Rex's "Château in Virginia Waters".

=== Hiatus and non-Swervedriver activity (1999–2007) ===
In addition to being burned out from the rest of their tour, the band members were growing tired of the encompassing drug scene at their studio space and had entertained selling Bad Earth Studio to Ash before the building lease ran out on them. As they closed down the studio and moved their gear out, the reality of an indefinite hiatus sunk in. Franklin embarked on a solo career that would come to rival his previous band's creative output, first as the experimental electronic pop/folk group Toshack Highway, whose releases ranged from six-piece ensemble works to four-track bedroom recordings, and then as a more traditionally guitar-driven solo artist, continuing to this day as Adam Franklin & Bolts of Melody. Hartridge went on to establish a distribution company. Hindmarsh turned to managing bands full-time under Badearth management, which he founded in March 1998, eventually contracting with Scottish rock band Terra Diablo.

In the beginning of 2005, the group convened in a collaboration with Castle Music to decide on songs for a retrospective. Juggernaut Rides '89–'98 compiled 33 tracks remastered from the original DATs (almost half of which being non-album tracks) and was released on 14 March 2005. The two-CD anthology featured four previously unreleased songs, including Shake Appeal's "Son of Mustang Ford" demo from 1989 and the remainder of Swervedriver's 1998 recordings, "Just Sometimes" and the orchestral string accompanied "Neon Lights Glow". Regarding the production effort for Juggernaut Rides, Franklin told Tape Op magazine, "Me and Jimmy sat there [during the remastering] and said, 'Wow this is pretty great.' You do forget things about the various tracks," and said to Australia's The Vine, "I quite like the fact that it's not chronologically laid out, so you just jump straight into the middle." Reviews touted it as "Swervedriver's beautiful corpse" and asserted that it "proves they were so much more than just another underachieving T-shirt band."

The following year on 24 November 2006, Hindmarsh published the autobiographical book Rider (Lulu.com self-publishing), which chronicles his experiences and observations on the road touring from 1992 to 1998 with Swervedriver. Meanwhile, Franklin had begun an indie rock collaboration with Interpol drummer Sam Fogarino under what would become the moniker Magnetic Morning. At the time, Franklin held little optimism for a Swervedriver reunion as they were all deep in individual pursuits but by mid 2007 had changed his outlook, referring positively to the successful 2004 reunion of the Pixies during an interview promoting his first release as a solo artist, Bolts of Melody. The former bandmates would get together with serious intentions shortly thereafter, when the idea resurfaced in a phone conversation between Franklin and Hartridge in early October 2007; on 19 October 2007, they officially announced that Swervedriver would reunite for a 2008 international tour. Hindmarsh confirmed the news on the band's discussion forum the following day: "Yep – it's true. Your enthusiasm & passion for the band over these past years has been truly awe-inspiring. Humbling in fact." Franklin released the following statement on 6 November 2007 about the band getting back together:

So it looks like Swervedriver will hit the road once more. It all happened quite quickly and we met up in a pub in London last month and figured out what we'd like to do, which at this point is just heading out and playing some shows again.

As far as new recordings are concerned, I already have two albums to record next year (a new 'solo' and [Magnetic Morning] debut) and they take priority. Maybe the Swervies can rustle up a new tune or two but really, there's more than enough going on with that back catalogue already.

I gotta say that something that really sparked my interest in this was hearing the live version of "Sandblasted" that has been posted for some time at swervedriver.com and subsequently at the MySpace page. I'd just never heard it played like that before. I mean, I guess I was there and everything, but it's got this great kinda country style to it that sounds like it might have only happened one night, and it's stuff like that that keeps the whole thing alive to me... not only in the music but the fact that other folks cared enough to record and post these recordings.

=== Reunion tour and activity (2008–2013) ===
Swervedriver kicked off their reunion tour on 27 April 2008 at the Coachella Valley Music and Arts Festival in Indio, California and continued through North America for the next two months. The band then performed a pair of shows in Great Britain at the Scala London and King Tut's Wah Wah Hut in Glasgow on 16 and 18 September 2008, respectively. On the heels of the tour's success, remastered and extended editions of Raise, Mezcal Head, and Ejector Seat Reservation were reissued in the UK by Sony BMG on 13 October 2008. The special edition Digipaks contained four rare album-era bonus tracks and a 16-page booklet with expanded artwork and liner notes written by Franklin and Hartridge. Label collaboration Second Motion Records/Hi-Speed Soul licensed the Raise and Mezcal Head reissues and released them to American audiences on 20 January 2009.

Swervedriver would go on to conduct a series of mini-tours over a year-and-a-half span (working around Franklin's busy solo career) beginning in late 2009 with another short stint in the UK. This first mini-tour culminated at the three-day All Tomorrow's Parties music festival at Butlin's holiday camp in Minehead from 4–6 December 2009, in which they shared a lineup with the likes of My Bloody Valentine, Sonic Youth, Buzzcocks, and Bob Mould. They regrouped a year later, this time reuniting with original drummer Bonnar, for two Scandinavian gigs in early November 2010 followed by a four-show trip to Australia in February 2011, attending the Perth International Arts Festival on 20 February 2011. In mid-June 2011, the band hit the three major US cities and Toronto with Mikey Jones of Bolts of Melody and Brooklyn dream pop act Heaven filling in for Bonnar, who was unavailable.

In preparation for an early 2012 American tour, Swervedriver appeared on Late Night with Jimmy Fallon on 26 March 2012, performing their debut single "Son of Mustang Ford" and premiering the song "Deep Wound", their first new material in 14 years, which was mixed and engineered by Albert Di Fiore. The tour went on for the next two weeks (with Jones again on drums), during which the band conducted a four-song studio session for KEXP 90.3 FM in Seattle on 4 April 2012, again playing "Deep Wound".

In June 2013, the band announced a five-date tour in Australia for late September–early October 2013 during which they would be performing Raise in its entirety along with "old and new highlights". The following month they recorded "Deep Wound" and on 20 August 2013 announced the single's release through Tym Records, scheduling a release date of 26 September 2013 to coincide with the start of the mini-tour. A limited number of purple seven-inch singles were made available for presale and limited edition red and yellow singles were sold during the tour.

=== I Wasn't Born to Lose You and Future Ruins (2014–present) ===
At the conclusion of their "Raise" mini-tour, Swervedriver began recording material for a new album at Birdland Studios in Melbourne and then continued work at Konk Studios over the first half of 2014. The band took a break from recording to reprise a one-off "Raise" show at The Garage in Highbury, London on 4 April 2014. On 7 January 2015, the band announced that their new album, titled I Wasn't Born to Lose You, would be released on 3 March 2015 through the Cobraside record label. The first single off the album, "Setting Sun", was released on 13 January 2015. When Steve George was unable to perform at some of the band's March 2015 US shows, Mick Quinn formerly of Supergrass acted as a fill-in bassist. As of 2018, Quinn is listed as a permanent member on Swervedriver's website and 2019 album, Future Ruins.

== Musical style ==
The band's sound has been labelled as shoegaze, alternative rock, dream pop, and grunge.

== Band members ==
Current members

- Adam Franklin – vocals, rhythm and lead guitar (1989–present)
- Jimmy Hartridge – lead guitar (1989–present)
- Mikey Jones – drums, percussion (2011–present)
- Mick Quinn – bass (2016–present; touring 2015)

Former members

- Graham Bonnar – drums (1989–1992, 2010–2011)
- Adi Vines – bass (1989–1992)
- Dan Davis – drums (1992)
- Danny Ingram – drums (1992)
- Jez Hindmarsh – drums (1993–1998, 2008–2010)
- Steve George – bass (1993–1998, 2008–2015)

== Discography ==
- Raise (1991)
- Mezcal Head (1993)
- Ejector Seat Reservation (1995)
- 99th Dream (1998)
- I Wasn't Born to Lose You (2015)
- Future Ruins (2019)
