= Ejector Seat Reservation =

Studio album by Swervedriver
- Released: 15 July 1995
- Genres: Alternative rock, indie rock
- Length: 45:31
- Label: Creation
- Producers: Alan Moulder, Swervedriver

Swervedriver chronology
Mezcal Head (1993)	Ejector Seat Reservation (1995)	99th Dream (1997)

Singles from Ejector Seat Reservation
- 1. "Last Day on Earth" Released: 1995; 2. "Bring Me the Head of the Fortune Teller" Released: May 1995

Ejector Seat Reservation is the third studio album by the British alternative rock band Swervedriver, released in 1995. The album includes three untitled hidden tracks which were only available in the United Kingdom.

== Critical reception ==
Professional ratings
Review scores
Source	Rating
AllMusic	4.5/5 stars
The Encyclopedia of Popular Music	3/5 stars

Trouser Press called Ejector Seat Reservation "one of the most quietly ambitious records" of the 1990s, praising the "more tempered, classic-pop format." MusicHound Rock: The Essential Album Guide called it the band's best album. Billboard called it one "of the more compelling guitar-pop albums of the mid-'90s."

== Commercial performance ==
Ejector Seat Reservation failed to reach the Official UK Albums chart Top 100 but the track "Last Day On Earth" made No.99 in the UK Singles chart, the band's most recent charting single to date.

== Track listing ==
1. "Single Finger Salute"
2. "Bring Me the Head of the Fortune Teller"
3. "The Other Jesus"
4. "Son of Jaguar 'E'"
5. "I Am Superman"
6. "Bubbling Up"
7. "Ejector Seat Reservation"
8. "How Does It Feel to Look Like Candy?"
9. "Last Day on Earth"
10. "The Birds"

(unlisted tracks)

11. "Plan 7 Star Satellite 10"
12. [unlisted silent track]
13. "Flaming Heart"

The bonus track, "It's All Happening Now", on the first UK promo was shelved (given away to fan club members) after permission was denied to use lyrics lifted from Bob Dylan's "It's All Over Now, Baby Blue". Sony BMG reissued the album in 2008 in the UK as a "Remastered and Expanded" edition with four bonus tracks

14. "Maelstrom"
15. "Director's Cut of Your Life"
16. "Just Sometimes"
17. "Neon Lights Glow"

== Personnel ==
- Adam Franklin - guitars and vocals
- Jimmy Hartridge - guitars and vocals
- Steve George - bass guitar
- Jez Hindmarsh - drums
