= Sandblasted (EP) =

EP by Swervedriver
- Released: 22 July 1991
- Recorded: The Greenhouse and Falconer Studios
- Length: 19:46
- Label: Creation, A&M
- Producer: Swervedriver

Swervedriver chronology
Rave Down (1990)	Sandblasted (1991)	Reel to Real (1991)

Sandblasted is the third EP release by English alternative rock band Swervedriver. Self-produced and recorded by the band, it was released on 22 July 1991, through Creation and A&M Records. The title track of the EP was included in the band's debut album, Raise (1991) and was released as their debut single, peaking at number 67 on UK Singles Chart.

== Background ==
On the song's meaning, Adam Franklin stated:

I don't know why we called it 'Sandblasted'. I think it might have been a bit subliminal because someane wrote something about us once and mentioned sandblasted images and maybe the words stuck in my head or something. The song's all about being out of it and being by the sea, walking along the beach being blasted. They've been sandblasting my Rat recently as well.

A promotional music video for the track was also released.

== Critical reception ==
Professional ratings
Review scores
Source	Rating
AllMusic	3.5/5 stars

Andy Kellman of AllMusic wrote: "Sandblasted again offers three great B-sides from the band, which boasts some nasty, digging, non-flashy guitar riffs from guitarists Adam Franklin and Jimmy Hartridge." He also further stated: "When most bands of this era put out a fraction of material this good, they realized they could do no better and packed it in. Swervedriver, however, were just warming up." Steve Sutherland of Melody Maker described the title track as "a head-on collision between guitars raging for chaos and a song that encompasses both the world-weary and the wonderstruck in time-honoured romantic tradition."

== Track listing ==
EP

1. "Sandblasted" – 5:41
2. "Flawed" – 3:55
3. "Out" – 3:24
4. "Laze It Up" – 6:46

7" single

1. "Sandblasted" – 5:41
2. "Out" – 3:24

== Personnel ==
=== Swervedriver ===
- Adam Franklin – vocals, guitar
- Jimmy Hartridge – guitar
- Adi Vines – bass guitar
- Graham Bonnar – drums

=== Other personnel ===
- Philip Ames – engineering
- MAX – mastering
- Anjali Dutt – mixing
- Designland – sleeve design
- Swervedriver – production

== Chart performances ==
7" single

Chart (1991)	Peak position
UK Single Charts	67
