= I Wasn't Born to Lose You =

Studio album by Swervedriver
- Released: 3 March 2015
- Recorded: Birdland Studios in Melbourne; Konk Studios, London
- Genre: Alternative rock, indie rock, shoegaze
- Length: 48:42
- Label: Cobraside, Dine Alone

Swervedriver chronology
99th Dream (1998)	I Wasn't Born to Lose You (2015)	Future Ruins (2019)

Singles from I Wasn't Born to Lose You
- 1. "Deep Wound" Released: 26 September 2013; 2. "Setting Sun" Released: 13 January 2015

I Wasn't Born to Lose You is the fifth studio album by British alternative rock band Swervedriver. It was released on 3 March 2015 through the Cobraside record label. It is the band's first album in 17 years, since 1998's 99th Dream.

The first single off the album, "Setting Sun", was released on 13 January 2015.

== Background ==
After the conclusion of their "Raise" mini-tour, Swervedriver began recording material for a new album at Birdland Studios in Melbourne and then continued work at Konk Studios over the first half of 2014. On 19 September 2014, the band stated via Twitter that they were mixing the album, which had a tentative release date of early 2015. On 7 January 2015, the band revealed the title, the track listing, and the cover art of the album.

The first single off the album, "Setting Sun", features a cover of the Television song "Days" as a B-side. The album also includes "Deep Wound", which was released as a single in September 2013.

Promotional videos were also released for "Autodidact", "English Subtitles", and "Lone Star".

== Critical reception ==
Professional ratings
Review scores
Source	Rating
AllMusic	4.5/5 stars
Exclaim!	7/10 stars
Pitchfork	7.0/10

Writing for Exclaim!, Daniel Sylvester wrote that the band are "as loose and confident as they've ever sounded," further calling the album "a solid return from a band eager to sound like themselves again."

== Track listing ==
1. "Autodidact" - 5:00
2. "Last Rites" - 3:26
3. "For a Day Like Tomorrow" - 5:29
4. "Setting Sun" - 2:52
5. "Everso" - 6:44
6. "English Subtitles" - 5:20
7. "Red Queen Arms Race" - 5:40
8. "Deep Wound" - 3:59
9. "Lone Star" - 4:33
10. "I Wonder?" - 5:39

== Personnel ==
Swervedriver

- Adam Franklin – vocals, guitar
- Jimmy Hartridge – guitar
- Steve George – bass, vocals
- Mikey Jones – drums, percussion
