= Shake Appeal =

Shake Appeal were an English rock group from Oxford, England, existing between 1984 and 1989. The last line-up of the band evolved into Swervedriver.

== Origins ==
The band took their name from a Stooges song off the album Raw Power. Their primary influences were the Stooges and the MC5. The first song the band learned to play was "Search and Destroy".

The original line-up was Graham Franklin (vocals), Jimmy Hartridge (guitar) (both previously in The Roadrunners), Adam Franklin (guitar) and Paddy Pulzer (drums) (both previously in Splatter Babies). Original bass player Paul Wilson left, and was replaced by Richard Mason, who was in turn replaced by Adi Vines.

== Early career ==
Throughout 1986, the band played in Oxford, Brighton, and London. They played one show at a squat in Hackney called the Blue House, with an early incarnation of My Bloody Valentine, who at the time closed their set with a version of the Stooges' "Shake Appeal".

After the departure of Wilson in 1986, the band recorded a four-song demo EP featuring the songs "Amphetamine", "Freedom", "Gimme Fever", and "Train Train" with Franklin on bass. The demo was reviewed in Underground magazine, who described the band as sounding "like MC5 with their shirts on fire", calling it "loud, obnoxious, and perfect for the late '80s". In 1988, they released a new version of "Gimme Fever" (featuring Vines on bass) on NoTown Records; the Black Flag-influenced "Mexico City SOS" was on the b-side.

Later in 1988, the band recorded a new version of "Amphetamine", and an MC5-inspired tune called "Rollercoaster". "Rollercoaster" was featured on The Jericho Collection, a compilation album featuring Oxford bands; "Amphetamine" was on a bonus 7" included with the album. The band was voted "Best Band in Oxford" by readers of local music magazine, Local Support.

== Evolution into Swervedriver ==
Around this time, the band had discovered the new American sounds Hüsker Dü, Dinosaur Jr, and Sonic Youth. They took these new influences on board and began to evolve a new sound. However, by 1989 the band felt stuck in a rut in the Oxford scene. After a gig at the Oxford Polytechnic opening for World Domination Enterprises, the band decided to split up.

Adam Franklin recorded home demos of three new songs: "Son of Mustang Ford", "Afterglow", and "Volcano Trash", and the band reformed to record studio demos of these songs, with Adam singing and Graham on backing vocals. Shortly after recording, Graham Franklin left to pursue electronic music with the techno band, Dimension 5, and Pulzer left to join the band Jack. The three remaining members, Adam Franklin, Hartridge, and Vines changed their name to Swervedriver. They added Graham Bonner, formerly of the band Ut on drums, and Swervedriver was soon signed to Creation Records, based on the strength of the last Shake Appeal demo.

== Discography ==
- "Gimme Fever" b/w "Mexico City SOS" 7" - (1988, Notown Records)
- Various artists: The Jericho Collection - (1988, Jericho Records) - Two Shake Appeal tracks appear on this compilation: "Amphetamine" and "Rollercoaster"
- Swervedriver: Juggernaut Rides - (2005, Castle Music) - Includes original 1989 demo of "Son of Mustang Ford"
