= Bolts of Melody =

Studio album by Adam Franklin
- Released: 26 June 2007
- Genre: Indie rock
- Length: 48:26
- Label: Hi-Speed Soul (US); Chatterbox Records (Aus)
- Producer: Adam Franklin, Charlie Francis

Adam Franklin chronology
Bolts of Melody (2007)	Spent Bullets (2009)

Bolts of Melody is the first studio album by Adam Franklin .

== Track listing ==
All tracks by Adam Franklin except Theme From LSD by Adam Franklin/Steve George/Jeff Townsin

1. "Seize the Day" –2:12
2. "Sundown" – 3:50
3. "Morning Rain" – 3:59
4. "Song of Solomon" – 3:13
5. "Theme from LSD" – 5:06
6. "Shining Somewhere" – 3:44
7. "Birdsong (Moonshiner Version)" – 2:58
8. "Canvey Island Baby" – 4:35
9. "Syd's Eyes" – 2:29
10. "Walking In Heaven's Foothills" – 4:04
11. "Birdsong" – 4:19
12. "Rain Return" – 1:11
13. "Ramonesland" – 6:46
14. "Silver Freight Train" – 4:27 (Australian bonus track)

== Personnel ==
- Adam Franklin – guitars, vocals, some bass, keyboards, drums on Syd's Eyes, production, mixing
- Locksley Taylor – bass, keyboards, some guitars, all instruments on Rain Return, recording engineer
- Matt Durrant – drums on 2,3,5,6,8,11,13
- Ron Lowder – drums on Seize the Day
- Mike Taylor– piano on Sundown and Ramonesland
- Charlie Francis – mixing, production
- Matt Sumrow – guitar, keyboards, vocals
- Mikey Jonas – drums
- Dean Williams – recording engineer
- Lurch - drums recording engineer
- Jason Marcucci – recording engineer on Seize the Day
- Suneil Pusari – recording engineer on Song of Solomon
- TJ Doherty – mixing on Syd's Eyes
- Arjun Agerwala – recording engineer for drums on Syd's Eyes
- John Golden – mastering
- Alison Pie – sleeve photograph and design
  - Source:

== Reception ==
David Raposa of Pitchfork said "his first official solo album sounds tired and worn-out, both in a good and bad way". Raposa thought the album "deftly illustrates that his way with a tune hasn't diminished in the slightest, but his attempts to split the difference between rocking and reclining leaves the album worse for wear". He opined that it "starts off with a relative bang, and while 'Seize the Day' says what it needs to say in just over two minutes, it comes off as a half-hearted nod to his previous days, and the same goes for the oddly muted 'Shining Somewhere'".

Tim Sendra from AllMusic was enthusiastic about the album, stating "guitars are to the forefront on 'Bolts of Melody', and Franklin uses every color in his six-string paintbox – backward solos, wah-wahed riffs, layers of reverb, waves of distortion, gentle acoustic strumming, and epic soloing ... but the guitar heroics never overshadow the songs, as Franklin has written some of his most memorable songs". He concluded by opining "the album is damn good, and you'll be blown away by the guitar heroics, restrained emotion, and inspired songcraft on display".

In his review for Drowned in Sound, Dom Gourlay commented that the album is "a diverse collection of songs that quite possibly represents Franklin's most satisfying body of work in almost two decades". John Bergstrom from PopMatters stated the opening song, "'Seize the Day' is driving guitars, an exhilarating chorus, pounding drums ... all coming in at under three minutes ... a top down jolt of adrenaline ... then, it’s a disappointment that most of the rest of 'Bolts of Melody' consists of slowies".
