= Future Ruins =

Studio album by Swervedriver
- Released: 25 January 2019
- Recorded: 2018
- Length: 47:41
- Label: Dangerbird
- Producer: Swervedriver

Swervedriver chronology
I Wasn't Born to Lose You (2015)	Future Ruins (2019)

Singles from Future Ruins
- 1. "Mary Winter" Released: 25 October 2018; 2. "Drone Lover" Released: 16 November 2018; 3. "The Lonely Crowd Fades in the Air" Released: 7 December 2018; 4. "Spiked Flower" Released: 11 January 2019

Professional ratings
Aggregate scores
Source	Rating
AnyDecentMusic?	6.9/10
Metacritic	80/100
Review scores
Source	Rating
AllMusic	4/5 stars
DIY	4/5 stars
Drowned in Sound	6/10
Mojo	4/5 stars
PopMatters	8/10
Q	4/5 stars
The Skinny	4/5 stars
Slant Magazine	4/5 stars
Uncut	7/10
Under the Radar	8/10

Future Ruins is the sixth studio album by English alternative rock band Swervedriver. It was released on 25 January 2019 through Dangerbird Records.

== Track listing ==
All tracks are written by Swervedriver.

No.	Title	Length
1.	"Mary Winter"	5:04
2.	"The Lonely Crowd Fades in the Air"	4:13
3.	"Future Ruins"	6:12
4.	"Theeascending"	4:45
5.	"Drone Lover"	4:18
6.	"Spiked Flower"	3:25
7.	"Everybody's Going Somewhere & No-One's Going Anywhere"	3:49
8.	"Golden Remedy"	5:42
9.	"Good Times Are So Hard to Follow"	3:09
10.	"Radio-Silent"	7:04

== Charts ==
Chart (2019)	Peak position
Scottish Albums (Official Charts)	92
UK Independent Albums (Official Charts)	27
US Heatseekers Albums (Billboard)	3
US Independent Albums (Billboard)	6
