= Spent Bullets =

Studio album by Adam Franklin
- Released: March 31, 2009
- Genre: Indie rock
- Length: 37:10
- Label: Second Motion
- Producer: Adam Franklin, Charlie Francis

Adam Franklin chronology
| Bolts of Melody (2007) | Spent Bullets (2009) | I Could Sleep For A Thousand Years (2010) |

Professional ratings
Review scores
| Source | Rating |
|---|---|
| Allmusic | 4/5 stars |
| Rock Sound | 7/10 stars |

Spent Bullets is the second studio album by Adam Franklin.

== Track listing ==
All tracks by Adam Franklin

1. "Surge" – 3:01
2. "Teardrops Keep Fallin' Out My Head" – 3:01
3. "Bolts of Melody" – 4:59
4. "Autumn Leaf" – 3:30
5. "Winter Girls" – 4:03
6. "It Hurts to See You Go" – 4:10
7. "Big Sur" – 3:27
8. "Champs" – 4:05
9. "End Credits" – 2:44
10. "Two Dollar Dress" – 3:34

== Personnel ==
- Adam Franklin – bass, guitar, composer, keyboards, vocals, producer, mixing, cover design
- Locksley Taylor – guitar, piano, cover design, guitar engineer, bass engineer, piano engineer, keyboard engineer
- Jeff Townsin – drums
- Josh Stoddard - bass
- Charlie Francis – producer, mixing, vocal engineer, bass engineer
- Robin Proper-Sheppard - drums engineer
- Tim Turan – mastering
- Mary Gunn – layout design
- Stephen Judge – management
