= Raise (album) =

Studio album by Swervedriver
- Released: 30 September 1991
- Studio: The Greenhouse (London, England); Falconer (London, England)
- Genre: Shoegaze; grunge
- Length: 44:54
- Label: Creation
- Producer: Swervedriver

Swervedriver chronology
Raise (1991)	Mezcal Head (1993)

Singles from Raise
- 1. "Sandblasted" Released: 22 July 1991

Raise is the debut studio album by English alternative rock band Swervedriver. It was released on 30 September 1991 by Creation Records. The album contained six new songs; "Son of Mustang Ford", "Rave Down" and "Sandblasted" had all appeared on earlier EPs and singles released by the band between 1990 and 1991. The album received very positive reviews.

Early pressings of the UK LP came with a free 7", which included the instrumental tracks "Surf Twang" (a 4-track version of "Last Train to Satansville") and "Deep Twang" (a 4-track version of "Deep Seat"). The album was reissued as a remastered and expanded edition with four bonus tracks in 2008 by Sony BMG in the United Kingdom and in 2009 by Hi-Speed Soul and Second Motion Records in the United States.

== Critical reception ==
Professional ratings
Review scores
Source	Rating
AllMusic	4/5 stars
The A.V. Club	A
Blurt	9/10
Entertainment Weekly	B+
Pitchfork	7.3/10
PopMatters	7/10
Select	4/5

Newsday labeled the music "guitar grunge in a good mood", writing that Swervedriver "masses guitars on its songs of mobility and escape".

In 2016, Pitchfork ranked Raise at number 15 on its list of "The 50 Best Shoegaze Albums of All Time".

== Track listing ==
All tracks are written by Swervedriver.

No.	Title	Length
1.	"Sci-Flyer"	5:12
2.	"Pile-Up"	3:42
3.	"Son of Mustang Ford"	4:11
4.	"Deep Seat"	6:04
5.	"Rave Down"	5:06
6.	"Sunset"	5:24
7.	"Feel So Real"	4:40
8.	"Sandblasted"	5:41
9.	"Lead Me Where You Dare..."	4:53

Early pressing bonus 7"
No.	Title	Length
1.	"Surf Twang"	2:24
2.	"Deep Twang"	3:20

2008 reissue bonus tracks
No.	Title	Length
10.	"Hands"	3:28
11.	"Andalucia"	3:52
12.	"Kill the Superheroes"	6:03
13.	"Over"	5:31

== Personnel ==
Credits for Raise adapted from liner notes.

Swervedriver

- Adam Franklin – guitar, vocals
- Jimmy Hartridge – guitar, vocals
- Adi Vines – bass
- Graham Bonnar – drums

Production

- Swervedriver – arrangement, production
- Arnie Acosta – mastering
- Philip Ames – engineering
- Anjali Dutt – mixing

Design

- Designland – sleeve design

== Charts ==
Chart (1991)	Peak position
UK Albums (OCC)	44
