= Sianspheric =

SIANspheric
- Also known as: SIANspheric^{4}
- Origin: Hamilton, Ontario, Canada
- Genres: Space rock, shoegazing, dream pop, experimental rock, ambient
- Years active: 1994–2000, 2005–present
- Label: Sonic Unyon
- Members: Sean Ramsay; Jay Patterson; Ryan Ferguson; Matthew Durrant
- Past members: Locksley Taylor; Paul Sinclair; Steve Peruzzi
- Website: sianspheric.com

Sianspheric (styled as SIANspheric, and previously as SIANspheric^{4}) is a Canadian space rock and shoegazing band originally from Hamilton, Ontario. This group were early signees to the Sonic Unyon label.

== History ==
The band formed in 1994, calling themselves "Sian", which is a Hindi word meaning "intelligent" or "bright," and it is a common surname in places where Hindi is spoken. They signed with the then-fledgling record label Sonic Unyon. The original members were singer and guitarist Sean Ramsay, singer and bassist Steve Peruzzi, Paul Sinclair on guitar, and drummer Matthew Durrant. The following year, Somnium, their debut album, was released. The band has been compared to Slowdive, The Verve, and Boards of Canada. SIANspheric gigged frequently, mostly in Canada, through most of the late 1990s and early 2000, including a tour with Canadian shoegazers Southpacific in 2000.

The band has also worked with Toshack Highway on a split album titled Magnetic Morning/Aspirin Age. A CD with ten tracks, Toshack Highway contributed the first five tracks, and SIANspheric did the remaining five. In 2000, the band broke up.

Sianspheric reformed in Toronto in 2005, and put out a new 7" single, "I Wouldn't Expect You to Understand". They followed this up with a DVD+CD release titled RGB, released on Sonic Unyon. The DVD contained live footage of the band recorded between 1997 and 2001, music videos, and short clips based on or featuring the band's music. The CD featured surround sound remastered versions of some of their long ambient pieces and fan-favourite songs, demos, and one previously unreleased song, "D'Yer Wanna Be P. Kember?".

As of 2006, SIANspheric band members were Ramsay, Jay Patterson (bass), Durrant and Locksley Taylor (additional guitars, backing vocals). All four members contributed to the band's ambient programming/sampling.

In 2011, SIANspheric regrouped with members Ramsay, Patterson and Durrant and with Ryan Ferguson (a.k.a. Electroluminescent) returning to provide additional guitars and synthesizers. They began recording new material.

Three songs from the album Somnium were used in the TV series La Femme Nikita. By 2014 the lineup was once again Ramsey, Patterson, Locksley and Durrant. The group continued performing, including participation in Canadian Music Week in Toronto in 2015.

After a preview track, "I Have It" was released the month before, their fourth full-length album, Writing the Future in Letters of Fire was released on October 28, 2016, by Sonic Unyon.

== Discography ==
=== Studio albums ===
- Somnium (1995, Sonic Unyon)
- There's Always Someplace You'd Rather Be (1998, Sonic Unyon)
- The Sound of the Colour of the Sun (2001, Sonic Unyon)
- Writing the Future in Letters of Fire (2016, Sonic Unyon)

=== EPs and singles ===
- Planets EP (1999, Sound Records)
- Magnetic Morning/Aspirin Age (2003, Sonic Unyon, double CD split EP with Toshack Highway)
- I Wouldn't Expect You to Understand (2006, Black Mountain Records, 7" white vinyl; limited to 300 copies)
- The Owl and Smokin' Richie (2014, Noyes Records, 7" vinyl and digital)
- So We Swim (2020, 7" vinyl and digital)

=== Compilations ===
- Else (1999, Sonic Unyon)
- RGB (2006, Sonic Unyon/Inchroma Multimedia, DVD+CD)
- Others (2014, Digital Streaming & Download)
- Others Vol. 2 (2020, Digital Streaming & Download)
