= 99th Dream =

Studio album by Swervedriver
- Released: 24 February 1998
- Genre: Psychedelia, indie rock
- Length: 49:52
- Label: Zero Hour
- Producer: Alan Moulder, Swervedriver

Swervedriver chronology
Ejector Seat Reservation (1995)	99th Dream (1998)	Juggernaut Rides '89–'98 (2005)

Professional ratings
Review scores
Source	Rating
AllMusic	3/5 stars
The Encyclopedia of Popular Music	3/5 stars
Entertainment Weekly	B
MusicHound Rock: The Essential Album Guide	3.5/5 stars
Pitchfork	8.0/10

99th Dream is the fourth studio album by the British alternative rock band Swervedriver, released in 1998. The band was dropped by DGC Records after recording the album; they retained the masters and eventually signed with Zero Hour Records.

== Critical reception ==
Entertainment Weekly wrote that "the sheer heaviness of the old Swervies is much missed, but even on cruise control the band has a singular intensity, not to mention a sharp sense of songcraft." MTV called the album "packed with odes to psychedelia and mesmerizing sonic displays that draw heavily from [Swervedriver's] post-punk past." The Quietus praised the "warm, spacey psychedelia and classic pop hooks." CMJ New Music Monthly wrote that "the band's ability to strike a balance between restraint and reckless abandon is way more impressive than even the catchiest of melodies." Stuart Berman of Pitchfork stated that even if the band "may not have envisioned 99th Dream as a swan song, the album's wistfully nostalgic lyrics and comedown vibe made it the most existential in their catalog".

== Track listing ==
99th Dream track listing
No.	Title	Length
1.	"99th Dream"	5:24
2.	"Up from the Sea"	3:23
3.	"She Weaves a Tender Trap"	3:41
4.	"These Times"	3:20
5.	"Electric 77"	7:34
6.	"Stellar Caprice"	3:36
7.	"Wrong Treats"	4:22
8.	"You've Sealed My Fate"	3:52
9.	"In My Time"	4:29
10.	"Expressway"	3:31
11.	"Behind the Scenes of the Sounds & the Times"	7:04

== Personnel ==
- Adam Franklin – guitars and vocals
- Jimmy Hartridge – guitars and vocals
- Steve George – bass guitar
- Jez Hindmarsh – drums
- Adam – sleeve art
- Nick Addison – engineer, mixing
- Andy Allen – photography
- Mark Aubrey – mixing, mixing assistant
- Jamal Chalabi – unknown contributor role
- Swervedriver – composer, mixing, primary artist, producer
- Duncan Swift – unknown contributor role
- Marc Waterman – mixing
- Paul Watson – photography, Sleeve Art
- Catherine Wessel – photography
- Robert Fisher – photography
- Graham Hogg – mixing assistance
- Jez – drums, engineer, multi instruments
- Ian Laughton – unknown contributor role
- George Marino – mastering
- Dick Meaney – engineer
- Stephen Molloy – unknown contributor role
- Alan Moulder – mixing, producer
- Matthew Sime – engineer

== Charts ==
Chart performance for 99th Dream
Chart (2024)	Peak position
Scottish Albums (OCC)	19
UK Independent Albums (OCC)	8
