= Rave Down =

EP by Swervedriver
- Released: November 1990
- Recorded: Jam Studios
- Genres: Alternative rock, shoegaze
- Length: 18:43
- Labels: Creation, A&M
- Producers: Anjali Dutt, Swervedriver

Swervedriver chronology
Son of Mustang Ford (1990)	Rave Down (1990)	Sandblasted (1991)

Rave Down is the second EP by English alternative rock band Swervedriver. Produced and recorded by Anjali Dutt and the band, it was released in November 1990, through Creation and A&M Records. The title track of the EP was included in the band's debut album, Raise (1991).

== Background ==
Rave Down is the second of a string of EPs that was released in early 1990s by Swervedriver, following Son of Mustang Ford (1990) and preceding Sandblasted (1991). It was recorded and mixed at Jam Studios.

== Critical reception ==
Professional ratings
Review scores
Source	Rating
Allmusic	3/5 stars

Andy Kellman of Allmusic wrote: "The bulldozing, bass-driven, Dinosaur Jr.-meets-Stooges onslaught continues in fine form." On the title track, he commented that "it is undeniably one of Swervedriver's all-time career highs, churning and chugging with that effortless flair they often possessed." Nevertheless, he also wrote that "B-sides are anything but afterthoughts or gap fillers," further explaining that "Afterglow" is the best of the extra material on the EP. NME critic Mary Anne Hobbs called its title track "a cyclone of wild, swollen riff machinery that sounds like it's been played with dislocated shoulder joints," and stated that the track "She's Beside Herself" is the only one [track] in which any other influence - an almost distinguished Costello-like vocal quality, oddly- is really discernible through Swervedriver's shredder-static."

The EP was made single of the week by a heavy metal magazine, which prompted band's bassist Adi Vines to describe their style as "ethereal metal."

== Track listing ==
All tracks written by Swervedriver.

1. "Rave Down" – 5:07
2. "She's Beside Herself" – 5:51
3. "Afterglow" – 3:03
4. "Zedhead" – 4:42

== Personnel ==
=== Swervedriver ===
- Adam Franklin – vocals, guitar
- Jimmy Hartridge – guitar
- Adi Vines – bass guitar
- Graham Bonnar – drums

=== Other personnel ===
- Amp Art – artwork
- Anjali Dutt – production, engineering
- Nick Taylor – additional guitar
