= Adam Franklin =

English guitarist, singer, and songwriter

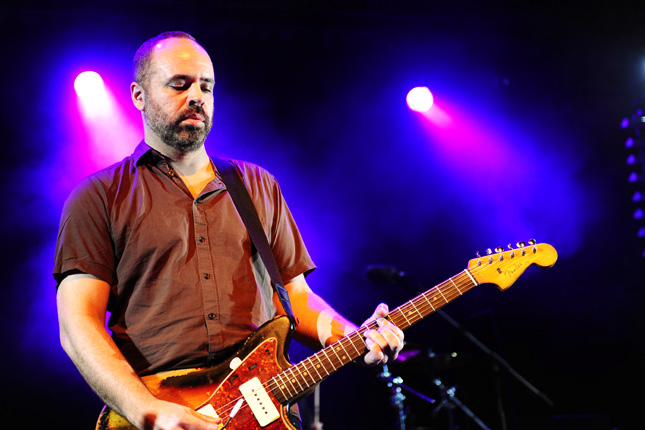
- Franklin in 2011

Background information
- Born: 7 October 1968 (age 57); Essex, England
- Genres: Alternative rock
- Instruments: Guitar; vocals
- Years active: 1984–present

Adam Franklin (born 7 October 1968) is an English guitarist, singer, and songwriter who is the front-man of the alternative rock band Swervedriver (1989–99, 2007–present) as well as the main creative force behind Toshack Highway (1999–2006) and currently releases records under his own name with his touring band Bolts of Melody. Franklin has released five independent studio albums in addition to three albums and two EPs under the moniker "Toshack Highway". He also sings and plays guitar in Magnetic Morning, a collaboration with Sam Fogarino from Interpol who have released an EP and a full-length album. Franklin is also a longtime member of the Sophia collective.

== Discography ==
=== Adam Franklin (& Bolts of Melody) ===
==== Studio albums ====
Year	Album details
2007	Bolts of Melody: Released: 26 June 2007; Label: Hi-Speed Soul; Format: CD
2009	Spent Bullets: Released: 31 March 2009; Label: Hi-Speed Soul / Second Motion Records; Format: LP, CD
2010	I Could Sleep for a Thousand Years: Released: 29 June 2010; Label: Second Motion; Format: LP, CD
2013	Drones & Clones: Released: 1 June 2013; Label: Adam Franklin / Bandcamp; Format: digital download
2013	Black Horses: Released: 16 July 2013; Label: Goodnight Records; Format: LP, CD

==== Singles and appearances ====
Year	Details	Notes
2004	"Outdoor Miner": Released: November 2004; Label: Words on Music; Format: CD	From the tribute compilation A Houseguest's Wish: Translations of Wire's 'Outdoor Miner'
2006	S.O.S.: Released: 1 October 2006; Label: Adam Franklin / Bandcamp; Format: digital download	Track list: 1. "S.O.S." (ABBA cover); 2. "Son of Sam" (Elliott Smith cover)
2008	"Shine a Light": Released: 1 June 2008; Label: White Whale Records; Format: iTunes digital download	Wolf Parade cover from the Adam Franklin / Handsome Furs split single
2010	"The Black Angel's Death Song": Released: 14 December 2010; Label: Adam Franklin / Bandcamp; Format: digital download	The Velvet Underground cover
2011	Winter, Winter, Winter: Released: 31 December 2011; Label: Adam Franklin / Bandcamp; Format: digital download	Track list: 1. "The Throat of Winter" (T. Rex cover); 2. "Wishful Sinful" (The Doors cover)
2012	"Shine a Light": Released: 28 February 2012; Label: White Whale; Format: 7" limited clear	Track list: A. "Shine a Light" (prev. released in 2008); B. "Elm Grove Window" (The Clientele cover)
2012	"I Want You Right Now (Kosmische Version)": Released 29 March 2012; Label: Goodnight Records; Format: 7" limited pink	From the Adam Franklin & Bolts of Melody / Heaven 7" split with the B-side "Colors in the Whites of Your Eyes" by Heaven
2012	"I Want You Tomorrow": Released: 17 October 2012; Label: Bandcamp; Format: digital download	Instrumental version of "I Want You Right Now (Kosmische Version)" appearing on Hush Delirium – The Taster LP, a sampler of tracks used in the Hush Delirium art & music collaboration project
2012	"California Solo (Band Version)": Released: 1 November 2012; Format: digital download	Appears on the soundtrack "California Solo (Original Music from the Motion Picture)"
2012	"California Solo (Waltz Version)": Released 12 December 2012; Label: Adam Franklin / Bandcamp; Format: digital download	Alternate version of the title song from the movie California Solo
2013	"Ramonesland (Instrumental in F)": Released: 1 February 2013; Label: Adam Franklin / Bandcamp; Format: digital download	Sales from this release donated to the Fund for Danny Lackey

==== Live studio sessions ====
Year	Details	Track list / Notes
2005	KEXP Session (NYC): Released: 12 September 2005; Format: limited digital download	1. "99th Dream"; 2. "The Streets That Spin Off"; 3. "Sundown"; 4. "Song of Solomon"; Recorded at the Museum of Television & Radio in New York City for "The Morning Show" with John Richards, KEXP Seattle
2007	KEXP Session (Seattle): Released: 13 July 2007; Format: limited digital download	1. "Morning Rain"; 2. "Shining Somewhere"; 3. "Birdsong (Moonshiner Version)"; 4. "Song of Solomon"; Recorded in studio at KEXP Seattle for "The Morning Show" with John Richards
2009	A Soundworld of Rain: Released: 10 June 2009; Label: Adam Franklin; Format: digital download	Recorded December 2007 at Jamnow Studios, Tinton Falls, NJ
2010	Rabid in the Kennel Session: Released: 9 June 2010; Format: digital download	1. "Yesterday Has Gone Forever"; 2. "Take Me to My Leader"; 3. "Spent Bullets"; 4. "Lord Help Me Jesus, I've Wasted a Soul"; 5. "I Want You Right Now"; 6. "Dreaming" (Sophia cover); Recorded at the Kennel Recording Studio, Brooklyn, NY

=== Toshack Highway ===
Year	Details	Notes
2000	Toshack Highway: Released: 11 April 2000; Label: Catapult / Flower Shop; Format: LP, CD	
2001	Everyday, Rock'n'Roll Is Saving My Life EP: Released: 1 October 2001; Label: Space Baby; Format: CD	Includes an acoustic 4-track version of Swervedriver's "The Hitcher"
2003	Magnetic Morning: Released: 20 May 2003; Label: Sonic Unyon; Format: CD	Double CD split with Sianspheric
2005	Everyday, Rock'n'Roll Is Saving My Life Vol.2: Released: 15 November 2005; Label: Sonic Wave Discs; Format: CD	Compilation of previously unreleased demos and live recordings from 1995 to 2005
2006	Birdsong EP: Released: 10 February 2006; Label: Shifty Disco; Format: internet download	Contains two versions of "Birdsong", which later appear on Adam Franklin's debut album Bolts of Melody, and two versions of "Theme from LSD" demo from Everyday, Vol.2
2006	"Syd's Eyes": Released: 26 September 2006; Label: Black Mountain Music; Format: 7" single	Includes the B-side "Silver Freight Train"

=== Magnetic Morning ===
Year	Album details
2007	The Setting Suns EP: Released: 18 October 2007; Label: DH Records / Friend or Faux Recordings; Format: digital download
2009	AM: Released: 27 January 2009; Label: Friend or Faux; Format: LP, CD
