= The Hoosiers discography =

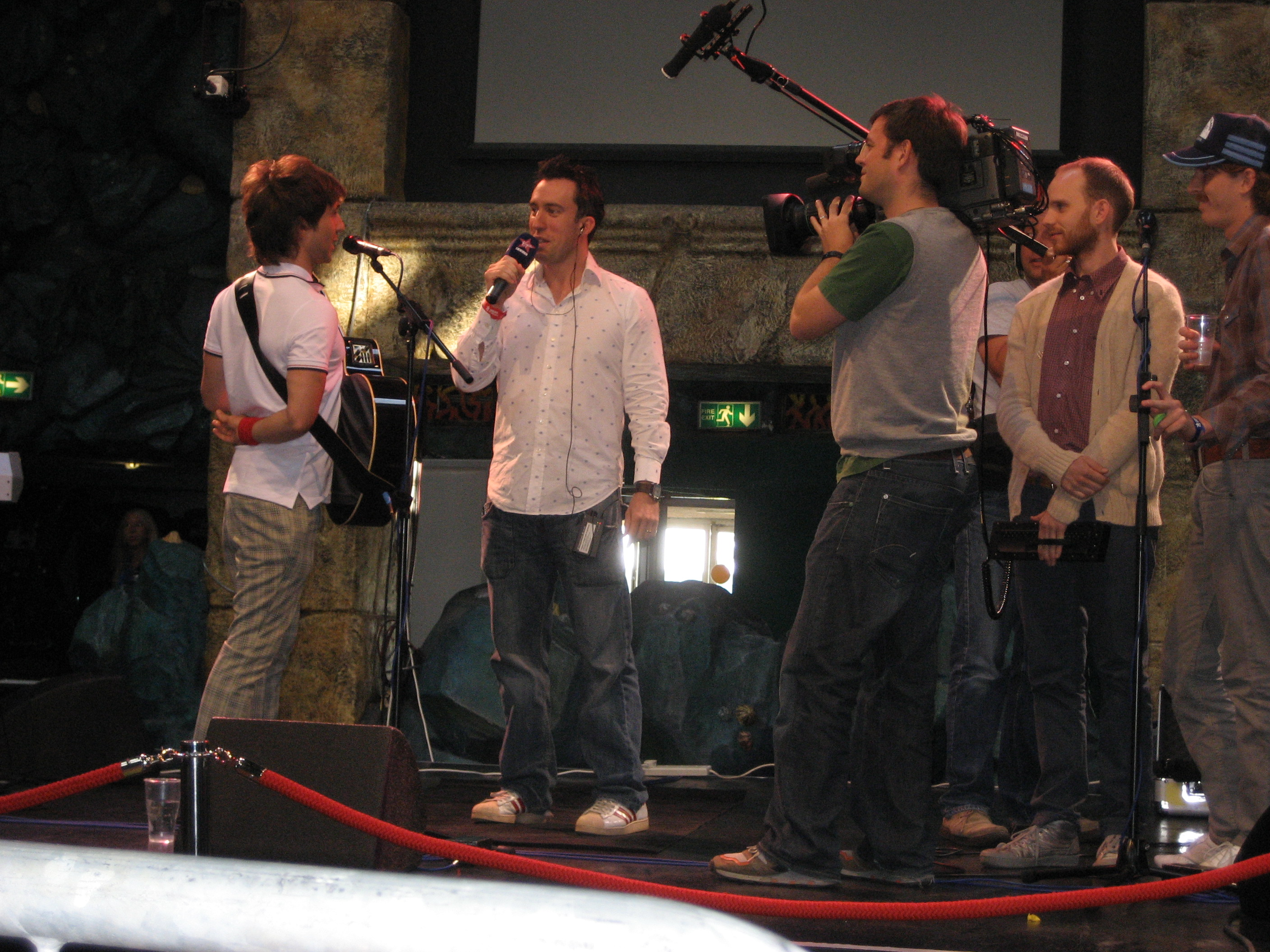
- The Hoosiers in August 2007 with Absolute Radio DJ Christian O'Connell
- Studio albums: 6
- Extended plays: 5
- Live albums: 2
- Compilation albums: 1
- Singles: 21
- Music videos: 22
- Reissues: 4
- Box sets: 1

The discography of The Hoosiers, a British pop rock band, contains six studio albums, four reissues, two live albums, one compilation album, five extended plays, twenty-one singles, twenty-two music videos and one box set.

The Hoosiers' debut album, The Trick to Life, was released by RCA Records in the United Kingdom in October 2007. The album peaked at number one on the UK Album Chart and has been certified two times platinum by the British Phonographic Industry. The Trick of Life produced the singles "Worried About Ray", "Goodbye Mr A", "Worst Case Scenario" and "Cops and Robbers". "Worried About Ray" and "Goodbye Mr A" both managing to peak within the top five on the UK Singles Chart at numbers five and four respectively.

== Albums ==
=== Studio albums ===
List of albums, with selected chart positions, sales, and certifications
Title	Details	Peak chart positions										Certifications
Title	Details	UK	UK Indie	BEL (WA)	EU	FRA	GER	IRE	JPN	SCO	SWI	Certifications
The Trick to Life	Released: 22 October 2007; Label: RCA (#88697156912); Formats: CD, digital download	1	—	76	8	82	91	47	62	1	65	UK: 2× Platinum
The Illusion of Safety	Released: 16 August 2010; Label: RCA; Formats: CD, digital download, LP	10	—	—	—	172	—	99	—	11	—	
The News from Nowhere	Released: 14 April 2014; Label: Crab Race; Formats: CD, digital download, LP	96	23	—	—	—	—	—	—	22	—	
The Secret Service	Released: 9 October 2015; Label: Crab Race; Formats: CD, digital download, LP	—	—	—	—	—	—	—	—	—	—	
Confidence	Released: 15 September 2023; Label: Crab Race; Formats: CD, digital download, LP	— (Note: Confidence did not enter the UK Albums chart, but peaked at number 33 on the UK Album Sales chart.)	17	—	—	—	—	—	—	22	—	
Compassion	Released: 15 May 2026; Label: Crab Race; Formats: CD, digital download, LP, cassette	— (Note: Compassion did not enter the UK Albums chart, but peaked at number 10 on the UK Album Sales chart.)	3	—	—	—	—	—	—	—	—	
"—" denotes a release that did not chart or was not released in that territory.

=== Reissues ===
Year	Album information	Notes
2011	Bumpy Ride: Released: 11 April 2011; Label: Angelic Union, ABSOLUTE; Formats: CD, digital download	Rerelease of The Illusion of Safety
2017	The Trick to Life (10th Anniversary Edition): Released: 17 July 2017; Label: Sony Music; Formats: CD, digital download, LP	Anniversary reissue of The Trick to Life
2022	The Trick to Life (15th Anniversary Edition): Released: 25 November 2022; Label: Sony Music; Formats: CD, digital download, LP	Anniversary reissue of The Trick to Life
2024	Overconfidence: Released: 19 January 2024; Label: Crab Race; Formats: Digital download	Deluxe edition of Confidence

=== Live albums ===
Year	Album information
2015	Acoustic Songs in a Church: Released: 26 October 2015; Label: Crab Race; Formats: CD, digital download
2015	Live in London: Released: 26 October 2015; Label: Crab Race; Formats: CD, digital download

=== Compilation albums ===
Year	Album information
2019	Greatest Hit(s): Released: 26 July 2019; Label: Crab Race; Formats: CD, digital download

=== Extended plays ===
Year	Album information
2007	iTunes Festival London: The Hoosiers Live EP: Released: 16 November 2007; Label: Sony BMG
2008	iTunes Live: Berlin Festival EP: Released: 2 May 2008; Label: Sony BMG
2009	iTunes Live: London Festival EP: Released: 11 August 2009; Label: Sony BMG
2015	The Wheels Fell Off EP: Released: 17 July 2015; Label: Crab Race
2015	Up to No Good EP: Released: 28 August 2015; Label: Crab Race

=== Box sets ===
Year	Album information
2023	The Hoosier Complex: Released: 20 January 2023; Label: Edsel Records; Formats: CD, digital download

== Singles ==
Single	Year	Peak chart positions										Certifications	Album
Single	Year	UK	BEL (FL)	BEL (WA)	EU	GER	IRE	JPN	POL	SCO	SWI	Certifications	Album
"Worried About Ray"	2007	5	68	64	18	94	38	—	35	16	85	BPI: Gold	The Trick to Life
"Goodbye Mr. A"	2007	4	—	—	15	—	23	3	38	17	—	BPI: Platinum	The Trick to Life
"Worst Case Scenario"	2008	76	—	—	—	—	—	—	—	33	—		The Trick to Life
"Cops and Robbers"	2008	24	—	—	—	—	—	—	—	30	—		The Trick to Life
"Choices"	2010	11	—	—	—	76	33	29	—	10	—		The Illusion of Safety
"Bumpy Ride"	2011	150	—	—	—	—	—	—	—	—	—		The Illusion of Safety
"Somewhere in the Distance"	2013	—	—	—	—	—	—	—	—	—	—		The News from Nowhere
"Make or Break (You Gotta Know)"	2014	—	—	—	—	—	—	—	—	—	—		The News from Nowhere
"The Wheels Fell Off"	2015	—	—	—	—	—	—	—	—	—	—		The Secret Service
"Up to No Good"	2015	—	—	—	—	—	—	—	—	—	—		The Secret Service
"Route 66" (with Woody & Kleiny)	2021	— (Note: "Route 66" did not enter the UK Singles Chart, but peaked at number one on the UK Singles Sales Chart.)	—	—	—	—	—	—	—	—	—		non-album single
"Hello Sunshine"	2023	—	—	—	—	—	—	—	—	—	—		Confidence
"Snowflake"	2023	—	—	—	—	—	—	—	—	—	—		Confidence
"Idaho"	2023	—	—	—	—	—	—	—	—	—	—		Confidence
"Making a Monster"	2023	—	—	—	—	—	—	—	—	—	—		Confidence
"Sleeping With The Light On"	2025	—	—	—	—	—	—	—	—	—	—		Compassion
"Man From The Magazine"	2025	—	—	—	—	—	—	—	—	—	—		Compassion
"Lonely Together"	2026	—	—	—	—	—	—	—	—	—	—		Compassion
"Automatic Glow"	2026	—	—	—	—	—	—	—	—	—	—		Compassion
"So High"	2026	—	—	—	—	—	—	—	—	—	—		Compassion
"Jigsaw Heart"	2026	—	—	—	—	—	—	—	—	—	—		Compassion
"—" denotes single that did not chart or was not released

== Music videos ==
Year	Song	Director
2007	"Worried About Ray"	Diamond Dogs
2007	"Goodbye Mr. A"	
2008	"Worst Case Scenario"	Rupert Jones
2008	"Cops and Robbers"	Diamond Dogs
2010	"Choices"	Diamond Dogs
2010	"Unlikely Hero"	Diamond Dogs
2011	"Bumpy Ride"	Craig Young
2014	"Make or Break (You Gotta Know)"	Daniel Broadley
2014	"Somewhere in the Distance"	
2015	"The Wheels Fell Off"	Reon Viljoen
2015	"Up to No Good"	Adam Scoffield
2021	"Route 66" (with Woody and Kleiny)	Henry Oliver
2023	"Hello Sunshine"	Will Hutchinson
2023	"Snowflake"	Will Hutchinson
2023	"Idaho"	Will Hutchinson
2023	"Making a Monster"	Will Hutchinson
2025	"Sleeping With The Light On"	MediaNerd Ltd
2025	"Man From The Magazine"	MediaNerd Ltd
2026	"Lonely Together"	MediaNerd Ltd
2026	"Automatic Glow"	MediaNerd Ltd
2026	"So High"	MediaNerd Ltd
2026	"Jigsaw Heart"	Villu Vares
