= Live on Other Planets =

Live album by Supergrass
- Released: 27 November 2020
- Recorded: 2020
- Genre: Alternative rock
- Label: Supergrass Records

Supergrass chronology
Diamond Hoo Ha (2008)	Live on Other Planets (2020)

Live on Other Planets is a double live album by Supergrass. Released on 27 November 2020, it consists of songs recorded during the band's reunion tour from earlier that year. Its title is a play on the band's fourth studio album, Life on Other Planets.

== Background ==
In 2018, the former members of Supergrass set in motion plans for a reunion tour in 2020 with the purpose of celebrating the 25th and 10th anniversaries of their formation and break-up, respectively. Following a surprise set at Glastonbury Festival’s Pilton Party on 6 September 2019, the band announced their 2020 reunion tour dates in Europe and the U.S.

The Supergrass reunion gigs were well-received, with their 21 February show at the Barrowland Ballroom in Glasgow garnering a five-star review from The Guardian. However, after completing their February and early March tour dates in Europe and U.K., by mid-March the band had to cancel the rest of their gigs because of the COVID-19 pandemic, including shows in the U.S. and Australia, and appearances at various festival, including Glastonbury.

== Release ==
On 25 September 2020, Supergrass announced the 27 November release of Live on Other Planets. The album was released to mark the band's 25th anniversary; to capture the reunion gigs and thank the fans who attended; and to support grassroots music venues, with proceeds from the album's sales going to the #SaveOurVenues campaign in aid of venues struggling due to the pandemic.

The CD edition of the album includes the bonus disc Bully for You, a full-set recording of the band's live-streamed performance on 21 August 2020 at The Bullingdon, Oxford.

== Track listing ==
Adapted from CD liner notes.

All tracks are written by Gaz Coombes, Mick Quinn, Danny Goffey and Rob Coombes, unless otherwise stated

CD One
No.	Title	Length
1.	"In It for the Money"	4:34
2.	"Richard III"	3:35
3.	"Mary"	4:26
4.	"Moving"	5:02
5.	"Seen the Light"	2:47
6.	"Going Out"	4:31
7.	"Late in the Day"	5:00
8.	"Rebel in You"	4:48
9.	"Low C"	4:30

CD Two
No.	Title	Writer(s)	Length
1.	"Grace"		2:42
2.	"Hollow Little Reign"		4:30
3.	"She's So Loose"	G. Coombes, Quinn and Goffey	3:22
4.	"Fin"		3:26
5.	"Time"	G. Coombes, Quinn and Goffey	3:29
6.	"Alright"	G. Coombes, Quinn and Goffey	3:09
7.	"Sun Hits the Sky"		5:50
8.	"Lenny"	G. Coombes, Quinn and Goffey	3:42
9.	"Pumping on Your Stereo"		4:29
10.	"Bad Blood"		4:06
11.	"Caught by the Fuzz"	G. Coombes, Quinn and Goffey	3:08

Bully for You [CD edition bonus disc]
No.	Title	Writer(s)	Length
1.	"Caught by the Fuzz"		2:37
2.	"Richard III"		3:34
3.	"Mary"		4:09
4.	"Moving"		4:51
5.	"St. Petersburg"		3:18
6.	"Grace"		2:26
7.	"Pumping on Your Stereo"		3:52
8.	"Strange Ones"	G. Coombes, Quinn and Goffey	3:54
9.	"Alright"		3:09
10.	"Sun Hits the Sky"		5:46
11.	"Lenny"		3:43

== Personnel ==
Supergrass

- Gaz Coombes – lead vocals, electric guitar, acoustic guitar
- Mick Quinn – bass, backing vocals
- Danny Goffey – drums, backing vocals
- Rob Coombes – keyboards

Production

- Mick Quinn – album co-ordination, artistic direction, cover design
- Max Bisgrove – recording engineer
- John Cornfield – mixing
- Tim Turan – mastering
- Adriaan Pels – photography
- Sabrina Benrehab – photography
- Gaz Coombes – photography
- Bruce Brand and Mary Teneketzis at Arthole – cover design
