= 2008 UK Music Video Awards =

UK music video awards show

- Date: 14 October 2008
- Location: Leicester Square, London
- Hosted by: Adam Buxton
- Website: www.ukmva.com

The 2008 UK Music Video Awards were held on 14 October 2008 at the Odeon West End in Leicester Square, London to recognise the best in music videos and music film making from United Kingdom and worldwide. The nominations were announced on 25 September 2008.

== Video of the Year ==
Video of the Year
- Björk - "Wanderlust"
  (Director: Encyclopedia Pictura)

== Video Genre Categories ==
| Best Pop Video | Best Rock Video |
|---|---|
| Kate Nash — "Foundations" (Director: Kinga Burza): Duffy — "Mercy"; Goldfrapp — "Happiness"; The Hoosiers — "Cops and Robbers"; The Hoosiers — "Worried About Ray"; The Ting Tings — "Shut Up and Let Me Go" | Supergrass — "Bad Blood" (Director: Keith Schofield): Arctic Monkeys — "Fluorescent Adolescent"; Kaiser Chiefs — "Love's Not a Competition (But I'm Winning)"; Radiohead — "House of Cards"; Sigur Rós — "Gobbledigook"; The Horrors — "She Is the New Thing" |
| Best Indie/Alternative Video | Best Dance Video |
| Björk — "Wanderlust" (Director: Encyclopedia Pictura): Bat for Lashes — "What's a Girl to Do?"; Emily Haines & The Soft Skeleton — "Our Hell"; Flight of the Conchords — "Ladies of the World"; Hot Chip — "Ready for the Floor"; Liars — "Plaster Casts of Everything" | Utah Saints — "Something Good" (Director: Eran Creevy): The Chemical Brothers — "Salmon Dance"; The Chemical Brothers — "Midnight Madness"; Groove Armada — "Get Down"; RJD2 — "Work It Out"; The BPA featuring David Byrne and Dizzee Rascal — "Toe Jam" |
Best Urban Video
Kano — "Hustler" (Director: Nez): Dizzee Rascal — "Sirens"; Estelle — "American Boy"; Example — "Me And Mandy"; Flobots — "Handlebars"; Wiley — "Wearing My Rolex"

== General Video Categories ==
| Best Budget Video | Best International Video |
|---|---|
| Example — "Me And Mandy" (Director: Henry Scholfield): Autamata — "Need You Sunshine"; Jape — "Floating"; Lise Westzynthius — "Childlike Curves"; The Teenagers — "Make It Happen"; These New Puritans — "Elvis" | Justice — "Stress" (Director: Romain Gavras): Animal Collective — "Peacebone"; Gnarls Barkley — "Who's Gonna Save My Soul"; MGMT — "Time to Pretend"; Weezer — "Pork & beans"; zZz — "Grip" |
People's Choice Award
Leona Lewis — "Bleeding Love" (Director: Melina Matsoukas): Adele — "Chasing Pavements"; Duffy — "Mercy"; Estelle — "American Boy"; The Hoosiers — "Goodbye Mr A"; Mark Ronson — "Valerie"; Sam Sparro — "Black and Gold"; Sonny J — "Handsfree"; The Ting Tings — "Shut Up and Let Me Go"; Will Young — "Changes"

== Craft and Technical Categories ==
| Best Art Direction in a Video | Best Styling in a Video |
|---|---|
| Björk — "Wanderlust" (Art Director: Isaiah Saxon): Badly Drawn Boy — "Promises"; Hot Chip — "Ready for the Floor"; The Hoosiers — "Goodbye Mr A"; The Hoosiers — "Worried About Ray"; Sonny J — "Handsfree" | The Hoosiers — "Cops and Robbers" (Stylist: Hannah Glossop, Suzie Coulthard): Gnarls Barkley — "Going On"; Klaxons — "It's Not Over Yet"; Late of the Pier — "The Bears Are Coming"; Róisín Murphy — "You Know Me Better"; Sonny J — "Handsfree" |
| Best Cinematography in a Video | Best Telecine in a Video |
| The Last Shadow Puppets — "The Age of the Understatement" (DOP: Andre Chemetoff): Emily Haines — "Our Hell"; Foals — "Olympic Airways"; Interpol — "No 1 in Threesome"; Take That — "I'd Wait for Life"; The Cinematic Orchestra — "To Build A Home" | KT Tunstall — "If Only" (TK: Adrian Seery at Rushes): Cage the Elephant — "Ain't No Rest for the Wicked"; CSS — "Rat Is Dead (Rage)"; Girls Aloud — "Sexy! No No No..."; Nine Black Alps — "Bitter End"; The Hoosiers — "Worried About Ray" |
| Best Editing in a Video | Best Visual Effects in a Video |
| Hot Chip — "Ready for the Floor" (Editor: Dan Sherwin at Final Cut): Gnarls Barkley — "Going On"; Johnny Foreigner — "Salt, Pepper & Spinderella"; Supergrass — "Bad Blood"; The Ting Tings — "Shut Up and Let Me Go"; These New Puritans — "Elvis" | The Horrors — "She Is the New Thing" (VFX: Corin Hardy, David Lupton): Björk — "Wanderlust"; The Chemical Brothers — "Midnight Madness"; Klaxons — "It's Not Over Yet"; Late of the Pier — "Heartbeat"; Mark Ronson featuring Lily Allen — "Oh My God" |

== Individual and Company Categories ==
| Best Director | Best New Director |
|---|---|
| Nima Nourizadeh: Alex & Liane; Diamond Dogs; Dougal Wilson; Jaron Albertin; Richard Ayoade | James Copeman: Chris Sweeney; D.A.D.D.Y.; Dan Sully; OneInThree; Price James |
| Best Producer | Best Commissioner |
| Grace Bodie: Gail Davey; Georgina Fillmore; Juliette Larthe; Malachy McAnenny; Tamsin Glasson | Tim Nash: Carole Burton-Fairbrother; James Hackett; John Moule; Mike O'Keefe; Ross Anderson |
Icon Award
Jonathan Glazer
