= The Illusion of Safety =

The Illusion of Safety may refer to:

- The Illusion of Safety (Thrice album), 2002
- The Illusion of Safety (The Hoosiers album), 2010
