= The Secret Service (album) =

Studio album by the Hoosiers
- Released: October 9, 2015
- Recorded: Konk; Megashed; Metropolis
- Genres: Pop rock; indie pop; indie rock; alternative rock
- Length: 42:35
- Label: Crab Race
- Producers: Ruadhri Ćushnan; Alan Sharland; Irwin Sparkes; Sam Swallow

The Hoosiers chronology
The News from Nowhere (2014)	The Secret Service (2015)	Confidence (2023)

Singles from The Secret Service
- 1. "The Wheels Fell Off" Released: 17 July 2015; 2. "Up to No Good" Released: 28 August 2015

The Secret Service is the fourth album released by British indie pop band the Hoosiers. It was released on 9 October 2015 by Crab Race and marks the band's first release since bassist Martin Skarendahl departed the line-up in July 2015.

== Background and promotion ==
The Secret Service was originally intended to be a series of EPs, released throughout 2015. Owing to fan pressure, however, The Hoosiers made the decision to instead release the work as a full album. Despite this, it was announced in July 2015 that the album would be preceded by two EPs, both containing new material alongside live recordings. The first, titled The Wheels Fell Off was released on July 17, whilst the second, Up To No Good, was released on August 28.

Both of these EP's title tracks have also been released as singles, with both "The Wheels Fell Off" and "Up To No Good" receiving accompanying music videos.

To promote the release, the trio embarked on a UK tour between October and November 2015. They also appeared in various media, to discuss the release, including an hour-long interview on radio station 107 Meridian FM.

== Critical reception ==
Professional ratings
Review scores
Source	Rating
The Irish Times	3 stars
Outline	7/10

Critical reaction to The Secret Service, and its accompanying EPs, was mixed.

Commenting on The Wheels Fell Off EP, Charlie Ginger Jones, of The Indiependent, commended the release for its "fun and upbeat" sound "that sets the standard high for the rest of the album." Reviewing the second EP, music review website cool music and things too praised the band, suggesting "Up To No Good" was "a particular highlight" and that the release was "a sign of great things to come."

Upon the album's full release, Alex Cabre, of Norwich-based Outline Magazine, was similarly positive about the release, scoring the album 7 out of 10. He noted The Secret Service captured The Hoosiers' "eccentric energy beautifully," whilst commending the record's "creamy vocals" and "tangy guitar licks."

Andrew Carless of The Irish Times gave a mixed review, praising "Wearing Down The Carpet", "Pristine" and "The Wheels Fell Off" as capturing "the same lively feel of the first two albums" but panning "The Most Peculiar Day Of Your Life" as leaving "a lot to be lyrically desired." He scored the album 3 stars.

== Track listing ==
No.	Title	Writer(s)	Length
1.	"Pristine"	Alan Sharland, Irwin Sparkes, Sam Swallow	3:51
2.	"The Wheels Fell Off"	Sharland, Martin Skarendahl, Spakres, Swallow	3:29
3.	"Up to No Good"	Sharland, Sparkes, Swallow	4:34
4.	"I Will Be King"	Sharland, Sparkes, Swallow	4:56
5.	"Dancers in the Dark"	Sharland, Skarendahl, Spakres, Swallow	3:37
6.	"The Most Peculiar Day of Your Life"	Sharland, Sparkes, Swallow	3:18
7.	"Runs in the Family"	Sharland, Sparkes, Swallow	4:10
8.	"The Secret to Happiness"	Sharland, Sparkes, Swallow	4:44
9.	"(Don't Make) Eye Contact"	Sharland, Skarendahl, Spakres, Swallow	2:11
10.	"Wearing Down the Carpet"	Sharland, Sparkes, Swallow	5:18
11.	"(My) Secret Service"	Sharland, Skarendahl, Spakres, Swallow	2:27
Total length:			42:35

== Personnel ==
Credits adapted from the liner notes of The Secret Service.

The Hoosiers

- Alan Sharland - Vocals, drums, percussion, production
- Irwin Sparkes - Vocals, guitar, bass, synth, production, engineering
- Sam Swallow - Vocals, keyboard, bass, mellotron, piano, bass synth, trumpet, thumb piano, rhodes, production

Additional personnel

- Ruadhri Ćushnan - Production, mixing
- Sam Harper - Engineering, mixing
- Andy "Hippy" Baldwin - Mastering
- Carl Glover - Design, photography
