= Lonely Together =

Lonely Together may refer to:

- "Lonely Together" (Barry Manilow song), 1981
- "Lonely Together" (Avicii song), 2017
- "Lonely Together," a song by The Hoosiers from the 2026 album Compassion
