= Diamond Hoo Ha Man =

Single by Supergrass

from the album Diamond Hoo Ha
- B-side: "345"
- Released: 14 January 2008
- Recorded: 2007
- Genre: Rock
- Length: 3:26
- Label: Parlophone
- Songwriters: Gaz Coombes; Danny Goffey; Mick Quinn; Rob Coombes
- Producer: Nick Launay

Supergrass singles chronology
"Fin" (2006)	"Diamond Hoo Ha Man" (2008)	"Bad Blood" (2008)

"Diamond Hoo Ha Man" is a song by British rock band Supergrass. The single was first played live at Guilfest 2007 in Guildford, England, and this live version was then released as a free download via the band's website (as was its B-side "345"). It is the first official single from the band's sixth album, Diamond Hoo Ha, and was released on 14 January 2008 as a vinyl-only single, limited to 1,500 copies, thus limiting its chances of charting, which it failed to do. An instrumental version of the song was recorded by Biff Hyman (Mick Quinn) for the Duke Diamond and Friends: Glange Fever Motion Picture Soundtrack.

Danny Goffey described the character of the "Diamond Hoo Ha Man" mentioned in the song; "Maybe he's like a really dodgy Fear and Loathing [in Las Vegas]-type travelling salesmen – he does his work but always has another plan in his head, something a bit seedy. But with the album, Diamond Hoo Ha also means a really good time. A "Diamond Hoo Ha Man" is someone who's a bit excessive."

The title of the song was in fact praised by Nick Cave, with Gaz Coombes saying; "It's a great image, not as good as one of David Bowie's weird characters, but it reminds me of one of those. We were batting it around, then Nick [Launay] said he'd spoken to Nick Cave and mentioned it as a possible title and he went, 'Yeah, man, I love it.' He has good album titles and if he likes it..."

This song has recently been used as background music in advertisements for Gatorade and ESPN's World Series of Poker.

== Music video ==
- Director: Charly Coombes (A.K.A. Chas Harrison)

The video opens with the following statement:

"Supergrass were not available for the making of this video.

But upon hearing the song on Radio Free Europe, Berlin's Diamond Hoo Ha Men decided to create their own cinematic salute to Supergrass.

Thank you & enjoy"

This is because the other members of the band (Mick Quinn and Rob Coombes) are not present, instead Danny Goffey and Gaz Coombes take on the role of the Diamond Hoo Ha Men under their alter-egos of Randy Hoo Ha and Duke Diamond. Mick's absence was probably due to his accident in August 2007.

The first scene shows Danny Goffey opening the door of a house in response to the doorbell being rung. There, additional guitarist Charly Coombes stands at the doorway, dressed as a 1970sesque badminton player under the alter-ego of Chas Harrison (ex-Middlesex County Champion Badminton Pro, now 'manager' of the band.)

Charly then shouts "Randy, come on! Where's Duke? The car's here!", to which Danny calls out "Duke!" to encourage Gaz Coombes to hurry up. Gaz joins them as they progress to the Cadillac waiting outside, with pink furry dice hanging from its rear view mirror, where a chauffeur opens the car door for them all. As they drive off the song itself begins. Then footage of the Diamond Hoo Ha Men live onstage is shown, with captions of 'Duke Diamond' and 'Randy Hoo Ha' to coincide with their appearance in the video and Charly joining them onstage to hit shuttlecocks at the audience with his badminton racket (This is because Gaz Coombes is apparently afraid of feathers).

The video then changes between film of scenes such as the band live (sometimes in black outfits, sometimes in the same outfits but white), in the Cadillac, Gaz and Danny as seen through a fisheye lens camera, people with obscure clown-like masks playing table tennis and dancing and images of the two during a sunset. As the handclaps in the song begin, the camera focuses on the Diamond Hoo Ha Men's clapping hands and duplicates the image of this several times across the screen. Finally the video ends with the Cadillac driving into the sunset.

Gaz Coombes plays a black Fender Telecaster Deluxe guitar throughout the video.

== Track listing ==
Limited edition chocolate 7" R6753

1. "Diamond Hoo Ha Man" – 3:26
2. "345" – 3:39
