= Brecon Beacons (disambiguation) =

Brecon Beacons may refer to:

- Brecon Beacons, a mountain range located in the south-east of Wales
- Brecon Beacons National Park, a national park in southern Wales
- "Brecon Beacons," a song by Supergrass from their 2002 album Life on Other Planets
