= Disastro =

Studio album by Sonny J
- Released: 16 June 2008
- Genre: Electronica, dance music
- Length: 48:56
- Label: Positiva

Singles from Disastro
- 1. "Can't Stop Moving"; 2. "Enfant Terrible"; 3. "Handsfree"

Disastro is the debut and only studio album by English producer Sonny J. It was released 16 June 2008 in United Kingdom, 19 August the same year in the US and was later also available on iTunes 15 September. The singles from the album are "Can't Stop Moving" (which was later re-released as a remix by Mirwais and then reached #40 in UK #8 in Japan), "Enfant Terrible" and "Handsfree" (which reached #77 in the UK Singles Chart).

== Critical reception ==
Popjustice said, "There is an entire Sonny J album on the way and it is a little bit amazing," and, "It would seem that Sonny J are applying an 'if it isn’t broke don't fix it' policy to their music, would it not."

The Guardian wrote, "Every summer since Big Beat took over Britain, a record like Disastro pops up, neon-bright and dazzling with samples. Sonny J's particular brand is nauseatingly effervescent," calling the album, "Horribly dated, the aural equivalent of a bottle of Hooch or a magazine with Liam Gallagher and Patsy Kensit on the cover," and, "A simple barrage of ideas is not enough, Sonny Jim."

PopMatters, "Some of these samples are just pretty, well, disastrous. Sonny J shouldn’t go away. He’s got the spark and the energy. I don’t doubt that his DJ sets are a kidult-filled sight to behold. He’s missed the vogue for dumb, silly breaks on Astralwerks by a decade, but on the bright side, it means he has the mistakes of his forebears to learn from."

The BBC, "The album takes a bucket of ideas and shakes them up in a ragbag of influences. What comes out is as sweet and surprising as a birthday cake."

== Track listing ==
1. "Enfant Terrible" – 3:38
2. "I'm So Heavy" – 4:04
3. "Handsfree (If You Hold My Hand)" featuring Donna Hightower – 3:45
4. "Cabaret Short Circuit" – 4:22
5. "Belly Bongo" – 3:25
6. "Sorrow" – 5:13
7. "Can't Stop Moving" – 3:03
8. "Strange Things" – 4:10
9. "Doing the Tango" – 3:37
10. "No-Fi" – 3:33
11. "Disastro" – 3:37
12. "Sonrise" – 6:29
