= Bumpy Ride (album) =

Studio album (reissue) by the Hoosiers
- Released: April 11, 2011
- Genres: Pop rock, indie pop, indie rock, alternative rock
- Label: Townsend Records

The Hoosiers chronology
The Illusion of Safety (2010)	Bumpy Ride (2011)	The News from Nowhere (2014)

Bumpy Ride is an album released by London indie pop band the Hoosiers. It is a rereleased version of their 2010 album The Illusion of Safety. It was released in the UK on 11 April 2011. The album features 3 new tracks not present on The Illusion of Safety, as well as a cover of Soft Cell's "Say Hello, Wave Goodbye", which was an iTunes-exclusive bonus track from said album. The deluxe version includes a DVD of live versions of some of the tracks.

== Track listing ==
No.	Title	Writer(s)	Length
1.	"Choices"	The Hoosiers, Toby Smith	2:48
2.	"Bumpy Ride"	The Hoosiers, Jodi Marr, George Noriega	3:59
3.	"Who Said Anything (About Falling in Love)?"	The Hoosiers, Eg White	3:05
4.	"Unlikely Hero"	The Hoosiers	3:50
5.	"Lovers in My Head"	The Hoosiers	3:39
6.	"Live by the Ocean"	The Hoosiers	4:03
7.	"Devil's in the Detail"	The Hoosiers	3:13
8.	"Glorious"	The Hoosiers	4:46
9.	"Made To Measure"	The Hoosiers	4:21
10.	"Giddy Up"	The Hoosiers	2:59
11.	"Sarajevo"	The Hoosiers	5:44
12.	"Little Brutes"	The Hoosiers	3:21
13.	"Say Hello Wave Goodbye"	Marc Almond	3:42
14.	"Sister Sister"	The Hoosiers	3:02
15.	"Used to Be Love"	The Hoosiers	3:16
16.	"Squeeze"	The Hoosiers	5:19
