= Seen the Light =

Single by Supergrass

from the album Life on Other Planets
- B-side: "The Loner"
- Released: 27 January 2003
- Studio: Toe Rag (Hackney, London)
- Genre: Rock
- Length: 2:27
- Label: Parlophone
- Songwriter: Supergrass
- Producer: Tony Hoffer

Supergrass singles chronology
"Grace" (2002)	"Seen the Light" (2003)	"Rush Hour Soul" (2003)

"Seen the Light" is a song by English rock band Supergrass. It was the third single from their fourth album Life on Other Planets. It was the first Supergrass release on DVD and reached number 22 on the UK Singles Chart when it was released in January 2003. The B-side "The Loner" is a cover version of a Neil Young song.

== Music video ==
The video begins with the statement "All the world await this human drama, of man's faith in God", which then leads straight to the start of the song itself. It is mainly black-and-white footage (however, there is a brief period of colour film around the middle eight) of music concert goers, people experiencing religious revelations and preacher men. The video ends with a wild audience applauding 1950s teen idol Fabian Forte, and finally a preacher proclaiming; "When you get to heaven, it'll all be out, and over."

"We're not actually in it," Goffey explains. "It's all really old footage of religious preachers mixed in with old footage of rock and roll audiences, and what's interesting is they react in the same way. They both go into these convulsions and pull their hair out and stuff. It's quite mad."

== Track listings ==
CD (CDR6592)

1. "Seen the Light" – 2:27
2. "The Loner" – 3:26
3. "I Told the Truth" – 2:20

Limited-edition grey 7-inch (R6592)

1. "Seen the Light" – 2:27
2. "The Loner" – 3:26

DVD (DVDR6592)

1. "Seen the Light" (video) – 2:45
2. "Brecon Beacons" (live audio)
3. "Rush Hour Soul" (live audio)
4. "Never Done Nothing Like That Before" (live video)
5. Picture gallery
