= Confidence (The Hoosiers album) =

Studio album by the Hoosiers
- Released: 15 September 2023
- Studio: Angelic Studios
- Genres: Pop rock, indie pop, indie rock, alternative rock
- Length: 36:57
- Label: Crab Race
- Producers: Sam Miller; Alan Sharland; Irwin Sparkes

The Hoosiers chronology
The Secret Service (2015)	Confidence (2023)	Compassion (2026)

Singles from Confidence
- 1. "Hello Sunshine" Released: 25 April 2023; 2. "Snowflake" Released: 30 June 2023; 3. "Idaho" Released: 4 August 2023; 4. "Making a Monster" Released: 15 September 2023

Confidence is the fifth album released by British indie pop band the Hoosiers, their first since 2015's The Secret Service. It was released on 15 September 2023 by Crab Race and is published by Downtown Music and distributed by Fuga. It is the band's first album as a duo, following the 2016 departure of keyboardist Sam Swallow.

== Background and promotion ==
In January 2023, it was reported that The Hoosiers were working alongside The Trick to Life producer Sam Miller on "their first studio album in eight years." In April 2023, alongside the release of the single "Hello Sunshine," the album, titled Confidence, was formally announced.

Since this announcement, three more singles have been released: "Snowflake" on 30 June, "Idaho" on 4 August and "Making a Monster" on 15 September. All four songs have been accompanied by music videos, created by Will Hutchinson.

To promote the album, in June 2023 the band announced a tour of the UK, to take place between September and October 2023. Sharland and Sparkes have also appeared on BBC Breakfast, BBC Radio Solent, Virgin Radio UK Talksport and BBC Radio 5 Live to discuss the release.

In December 2023, the duo announced that a deluxe edition of the album would be released on 19 January 2024. Titled Overconfidence, it features five additional tracks.

== Critical reception ==
Professional ratings
Review scores
Source	Rating
Retro Pop Magazine	3/5 stars

Upon the album's initial release, critical reception was positive, with Jeremy Williams-Chalmers of the Lancashire Times claiming the band sounds "stronger than ever before" and that Confidence is "a much-needed shot of optimism in a time of global adversity."

Retro Pop Magazine too praised the album, scoring it three of five stars, likening "Hello Sunshine" to the sound of the band's debut album and noting that "16 years after releasing their first, major label LP... they continue to deliver the goods."

Jane Savidge, of Bristol-based music venue The Thekla, was similarly positive, suggesting the album should be considered "one of the natural wonders of the world" and that the record was "effortlessly beguiling."

Reviews of the album's associated tour were also positive, with B24/7 suggesting tracks from Confidence were "met with the same enthusiasm as the classics" at the September 28th Bristol performance. Of the October 1st Newcastle event, Music For The Misfits was similarly upbeat, suggesting the set had "surpassed our expectations" and that the band "have returned with renewed energy."

== Track listing ==
Confidence
No.	Title	Writer(s)	Length
1.	"Welcome to Confidence"	Alan Sharland, Irwin Sparkes	0:46
2.	"Making a Monster"	Sharland, Sparkes	3:25
3.	"Hello Sunshine"	Sharland, Sparkes	3:44
4.	"Idaho"	Sharland, Sparkes	3:37
5.	"G.O.A.T."	Sharland, Sparkes	3:18
6.	"Lip Sinking"	Sharland, Sparkes	4:31
7.	"Losing Your Balance"	Sharland, Sparkes	0:32
8.	"Things You Remember When You're Falling"	Sharland, Sparkes	3:29
9.	"Snowflake"	Sharland, Sparkes	2:48
10.	"Confidence (Is Easy)"	Sharland, Sparkes	2:30
11.	"So High (Acoustic)"	Sharland, Sparkes	3:40
12.	"Lying"	Sharland, Sparkes	4:37
Total length:			36:57

Overconfidence bonus tracks
No.	Title	Writer(s)	Length
13.	"Messing with My Feelings"	Sharland, Sparkes	3:54
14.	"Gung Ho"	Sharland, Sparkes	2:59
15.	"Mister Moon"	Sharland, Sparkes	3:34
16.	"Making a Monster (Live at Koko 2023)"	Sharland, Sparkes	3:36
17.	"Up to No Good (Live at Koko 2023)"	Sharland, Sparkes, Sam Swallow	5:04
Total length:			19:07

== Personnel ==
Credits adapted from the liner notes of Confidence.

The Hoosiers

- Alan Sharland – Production, drums, percussion, dulcimer, vocals
- Irwin Sparkes – Production, guitars, keyboard, vocals

Additional personnel

- Leighton Allen - Bass
- Paul Frith - Piano, synths, bass arrangement
- Sabastian Philpott - Trumpet
- Barney Philpott - Trombone
- Sam Miller - Production
- Luke Gibbs - Engineering
- Adele Phillips - Engineering
- Christian Wright - Mastering
- Will Hutch - Photography
- Amy Freeman Isles - Artwork
- George Rutledge - Artwork

== Charts ==
Chart performance for Confidence
Chart (2023)	Peak position
Scottish Albums (OCC)	22
UK Album Downloads (OCC)	72
UK Album Sales (OCC)	33
UK Independent Albums (OCC)	17
UK Physical Albums (OCC)	35
UK Record Store (OCC)	10
