= Supergrass (album) =

Studio album by Supergrass
- Released: 20 September 1999
- Studio: Sawmills (Cornwall, England); Ridge Farm (West Sussex, England)
- Genre: Alternative rock; Britpop
- Length: 45:30
- Label: Parlophone (UK); Island (US); Echo (2018 reissue)
- Producer: Supergrass; John Cornfield

Supergrass chronology
In It for the Money (1997)	Supergrass (1999)	Life on Other Planets (2002)

Singles from Supergrass
- 1. "Pumping on Your Stereo" Released: 24 May 1999; 2. "Moving" Released: 6 September 1999; 3. "Mary" Released: 22 November 1999

Professional ratings
Review scores
Source	Rating
AllMusic	3/5 stars
Entertainment Weekly	A
The Guardian	2/5 stars
Melody Maker	4/5 stars
NME	5/10
Pitchfork	9.0/10
Q	4/5 stars
Rolling Stone	3/5 stars
Select	4/5
Uncut	4/5 stars

Supergrass is the third studio album by the English alternative rock band Supergrass. It was released in the UK on 20 September 1999 and reached number 3. It is often referred to as "the X-ray album", due to the picture on the sleeve. In Australia a free CD was included with some live tracks. In 2022, the album was remastered and reissued as a 2CD deluxe edition, which includes new remixes of several of the songs created by John Leckie and John Cornfield among other bonus tracks.

== Track listing ==
All tracks written by Supergrass/Rob Coombes.

CD 5220562 / TC 5220564 / 12" 5220561 / MD 5220569

1. "Moving" (4:26)
2. "Your Love" (3:27) This features a harpsichord in the outro.
3. "What Went Wrong (In Your Head)" (4:05)
4. "Beautiful People" (3:22)
5. "Shotover Hill" (3:43)
6. "Eon" (3:44)
7. "Mary" (4:00)
8. "Jesus Came from Outta Space" (4:10)
9. "Pumping on Your Stereo" (3:20)
10. "Born Again" (3:38)
11. "Faraway" (5:05)
12. "Mama & Papa" (2:30)

Limited edition CD 5220560

This was free with a limited number of CD releases of Supergrass.

- Exclusive band photographs
- Full discography
- "Caught by the Fuzz" video (2:19)
- "Time" video (3:12)

Limited edition Mary Live bonus CD (AUS only)

The Australian release of the album in 1999 came with a bonus live EP to coincide with the Australian leg of Supergrass' tour.

1. "Mary" from Lamacq Live (4:02)
2. "Pumping on Your Stereo" live from Peel Acres (3:12)
3. "Strange Ones" live from Peel Acres (3:57)
4. "Richard III" live from Peel Acres (3:29)
5. "Sun Hits the Sky" live from Peel Acres (4:44)

2022 deluxe edition CD2

1. "Moving" – John Leckie and Mick Quinn 2022 Remix (5:22)
2. "Beautiful People" – John Cornfield and Mick Quinn 2022 Remix (3:54)
3. "Pumping on Your Stereo" – John Leckie and Mick Quinn 2022 Remix (3:47)
4. "Born Again" – John Cornfield and Mick Quinn 2022 Remix (3:34)
5. "Wild Wind" – Demo (1:50)
6. "Pumping on Your Stereo" – Live at T in the Park, 2000 (3:15)
7. "Lucky (No Fear)" (3:09)
8. "Blockades" – Studio Outtake (4:12)
9. "Sick" (3:40)
10. "You'll Never Walk Again" (2:19)
11. "What a Shame" (2:40)
12. "Moving" – Live at T in the Park, 2000 (4:52)
13. "Believer" (3:47)
14. "Faraway" (Acoustic Version) (4:55)
15. "Out of the Blue" – Monitor Mix (2:14)
16. "Mary" – Live at City Varieties, Leeds, 2005 (3:09)
17. "Country Number" – Demo (3:38)
18. "Born Again" – Live at The Forum, Melbourne, 2000 (3:52)
19. "Jesus Came from Outta Space" – Live from 107.7 The End, Seattle (3:26)
20. "Oracle" (3:41)

== Personnel ==
Supergrass

- Gaz Coombes – vocals, guitar
- Mick Quinn – bass, vocals
- Danny Goffey – drums, vocals

(entire band is also credited with "bells, whistles & bicycle pumps")

Additional musicians

- Rob Coombes – keyboards
- Satin Singh – percussion
- Gavyn Wright, Patrick Kieran, Boguslav Kostecki, Jackie Shave – violins
- Bill Benham, Andrew Parker – violas
- Martin Loveday, Frank Shaefer – cellos

== Charts ==
=== Weekly charts ===
Chart (1999–2000)	Peak position
Australian Albums (ARIA)	15
Dutch Albums (Album Top 100)	32
French Albums (SNEP)	42
German Albums (Offizielle Top 100)	60
Irish Albums (IRMA)	59
New Zealand Albums (RMNZ)	7
Norwegian Albums (VG-lista)	4
Scottish Albums (OCC)	4
Swedish Albums (Sverigetopplistan)	26
UK Albums (OCC)	3
US Heatseekers Albums (Billboard)	13

=== Year-end charts ===
Chart (1999)	Position
UK Albums (OCC)	57
