= Diamond Hoo Ha =

Studio album by Supergrass
- Released: 24 March 2008
- Recorded: January–November 2007
- Studios: Hansa Tonstudio, Berlin and Los Angeles
- Genre: Alternative rock
- Length: 41:10
- Labels: Parlophone (UK); Astralwerks (US)
- Producer: Nick Launay

Supergrass chronology
Road to Rouen (2005)	Diamond Hoo Ha (2008)	Live on Other Planets (2020)

Singles from Diamond Hoo Ha
- 1. "Diamond Hoo Ha Man" Released: 14 January 2008; 2. "Bad Blood" Released: 17 March 2008; 3. "Rebel in You" Released: 30 June 2008

Diamond Hoo Ha is the sixth studio album by British alternative rock band Supergrass, released in the UK on 24 March 2008, and offers a return to punchier Supergrass songs, in comparison to the more mellow Road to Rouen, their previous album released in 2005. Several songs appearing on the album were performed at Guilfest 2007. In November 2007, the track "Diamond Hoo Ha Man"—one of the songs debuted at Guilfest—was distributed as the first single on a limited vinyl release, restricted to 1500 copies. "Bad Blood" followed as the second single on 17 March 2008, peaking in the top 75 at number 73.

The third single, "Rebel in You" with B-side "Car Crash", was limited to 1500 copies on 7" white vinyl only and released on 30 June 2008 via Supergrass Records (the release date and distribution, however, were delayed past 30 June due to a problem at the record pressing plant). The single is only available for mail order purchase from the Supergrass Records website, with the first 200 copies ordered being signed by the band themselves. The single was planned to be distributed by Parlophone, but EMI refused to fund its release, along with any costs for the creation of an accompanying video. The singles' covers all follow the trend of having a gorilla's hand on them.

== Recording and production ==
Diamond Hoo Ha was recorded at Hansa Tonstudio in Berlin where David Bowie, amongst others, had also previously recorded albums. "The whole place hasn't changed much since the Seventies – the furniture hadn't been cleaned, loads of the stuff didn't work. The mixing desk was quite fucked, so it took three or four days to get the first backing track done. But the atmosphere was great. It was a bit of a shaky start but we were flying after that," recounted Danny Goffey.

The group apparently spent six months writing lyrics for the album, splitting into pairs for inspiration.

Nick Launay, who had worked with names such as PiL, Kate Bush, Gang of Four, Midnight Oil and Nick Cave was nominated as producer for the record; "He [Launay] knew Danny was like an animal on the kit, about Rob's experimentation on the keyboards, what Mick could do on the bass. Nick just understood us. He's loved our band for a long time, seen us live, recognized the energy. At the start he said, I know what you can do, and I've seen you do it, but I'd love to make a record where you all go for it," said Gaz Coombes. The track "Bad Blood" is featured in the video game Need for Speed Undercover.

== Packaging ==
The front cover displays the band in a group photo with their instruments; (the photography for this is credited to Kevin Westenberg) the guitar Gaz Coombes is pictured with is a Fender Telecaster Deluxe and the overall album artwork design was compiled by Traffic.

== Reception ==
Professional ratings
Aggregate scores
Source	Rating
Metacritic	67/100
Review scores
Source	Rating
AllMusic	3.5/5 stars
Drowned in Sound	6/10
Entertainment.ie	3.5/5 stars
The Independent	2/5 stars
Metro	3/5 stars
NME	7/10
Pitchfork	6.2/10
Time Out	4/6 stars
The Times	3/5 stars
Uncut	4/5 stars

Diamond Hoo Ha was met with generally favourable reviews from music critics. At Metacritic, which assigns a normalized rating out of 100 to reviews from mainstream publications, the album received an average score of 67, based on 22 reviews.

The album peaked at number 19 in the UK charts, making it their lowest charting album. The three singles from Diamond Hoo Ha received a fair amount of airplay on rock radio stations with all three entering the Xfm playlist. However, because the three singles did not enter the top 40 they did not receive very regular airplay on the more mainstream radio stations. The NME said that the album was "definitely worth making a Hoo Ha over", and Uncut claimed that it was "Twenty four carat stuff guaranteed."

== Singles ==
- "Diamond Hoo Ha Man" – vinyl limited to 1500 copies
- "Bad Blood" – No. 73 UK
- "Rebel in You" – vinyl limited to 1500 copies

== Track listing ==
All tracks written and composed by Supergrass (Coombes/Coombes/Goffey/Quinn).

1. "Diamond Hoo Ha Man" – 3:25
2. "Bad Blood" – 3:03
3. "Rebel in You" – 4:41
4. "When I Needed You" – 2:31
5. "345" – 3:39
6. "The Return Of..." – 3:35
7. "Rough Knuckles" – 3:24
8. "Ghost of a Friend" – 3:54
9. "Whiskey & Green Tea" – 4:16
10. "Outside" – 3:32
11. "Butterfly" – 5:10

== Personnel ==
=== Supergrass ===
- Gaz Coombes
- Mick Quinn
- Rob Coombes
- Danny Goffey

=== Additional personnel ===
- Pete Wareham – saxophone on track 6 and track 9
- Jodie Rose – additional vocals on track 8

=== Production ===
- Nick Launay – producer, mixing
- Steven Marcussen – mastering
- Stuart Whitmore – editing
- Rich Costey – mixing on track 3
- Ian Davenport – additional recording
- Sam Williams – additional arrangements on tracks 2, 3, 5, 10 and 11

== Charts ==
Chart performance for Diamond Hoo Ha
Chart (2008)	Peak position
Australian Albums (ARIA)	78
French Albums (SNEP)	66
Irish Albums (IRMA)	49
Italian Albums (FIMI)	100
UK Albums (Official Charts)	19
US Heatseekers Albums (Billboard)	22
