= Choices (The Hoosiers song) =

2010 single by The Hoosiers

Single by The Hoosiers

from the album The Illusion of Safety
- B-side: The Illusion of an Album ^{[A]}
- Released: 1 August 2010
- Recorded: 2009
- Genre: New wave, synthpop, indie pop
- Length: 2:50
- Label: RCA
- Songwriters: Alan Sharland, Martin Skarendahl, Toby Smith, Irwin Sparkes, Sam Swallow

The Hoosiers singles chronology
| "Cops and Robbers" (2008) | "Choices" (2010) | "Bumpy Ride" (2011) |

"Choices" is the lead single from the English indie pop band The Hoosiers, taken from their second studio album, The Illusion of Safety, and was released in the UK on 1 August 2010. The single was the band's fifth released single overall.

The music video of "Choices" was by the directing duo Diamond Dogs, who also directed the Hoosiers in "Worried about Ray", "Goodbye Mr A" and "Cops and Robbers".

== Critical reception ==
Nick Levine of Digital Spy gave the song a positive review stating:

However, those critics might just owe them a rethink, because musically-speaking the Anglo-Swedish trio have managed to suppress their more irksome tendencies. In fact, 'Choices' finds them adopting an oh-so contemporary electropop complete with big rubbery synths that Calvin Harris wouldn't cock a snook at. Crucially, in the process they haven't lost their ability to pen a proper pop chorus or, for that matter, a middle 8 that swells like an Olympic gold medallist's chest. Odd-pop? Nope, this is just top pop. (For the record, we tend to plump for both, but on the side.).

Fraser McAlpine of the BBC's Chart Blog gave them a positive review:

The thing with the Hoosiers going a bit electropop is it is in no way a betrayal of the band they were on their first album, nor is it a shameless sellout - a stab at a sound which is more commercial. I say this in the full and certain knowledge that I am not psychic, and the people in the band could well be cravenly chasing the hit sound of the nowadays with no thought of artistic worth whatsoever. ... In summary: new Hoosiers good, cocky restaurants bad..

== World record attempt ==
In an attempt to break the world record for the longest song ever recorded, The Hoosiers have released a version of the song that is available on iTunes to download called, "Stop Giving Me Verses". The band began a competition prior to the song's recording asking fans to write verses and send them in, no matter how ridiculous. The song is over 40 minutes long, and is the single "Choices" with hand-picked winners' lyrics. It was the first time that drummer Alfonso and bassist Martin took lead vocals for certain verses, and featured cameo verses from Jeff Leach and Katy Brand.

== Track listing ==
- Digital Download

| No. | Title | Length |
|---|---|---|
| 1. | "Choices" | 2:50 |
| 2. | "The Illusion of an Album ^{[A]}" | 12:03 |

- Extended Play

| No. | Title | Length |
|---|---|---|
| 1. | "Choices" | 2:50 |
| 2. | "Choices (Glam As You Club Mix)" | 5:12 |
| 3. | "Choices (Glam As You Radio Mix)" | 3:07 |
| 4. | "Choices (Glam As You Instrumental)" | 3:09 |

Notes:

- ^{A} - The song consists of clips from all 12 tracks from The Illusion of Safety album.

== Chart positions ==
| Chart (2010) | Position |
|---|---|
| German Singles Chart | 76 |
| UK Singles Chart | 11 |
