= Cops and Robbers (song) =

2008 single by the Hoosiers

Single by the Hoosiers

from the album The Trick to Life
- B-side: "Goodbye Mr A" (live)
- Released: 21 April 2008
- Length: 4:00
- Label: RCA
- Songwriter: The Hoosiers
- Producer: Toby Smith

The Hoosiers singles chronology
| "Worst Case Scenario" (2008) | "Cops and Robbers" (2008) | "Choices" (2010) |

"Cops and Robbers" is a single by English pop rock band the Hoosiers. It was their fourth single to be released from their debut album, The Trick to Life. It was first made available to download through the album which was released on 22 October 2007. The single was physically released on 21 April 2008 as confirmed by the band on tour. The song has been noted for its remarkable similarities to "The Lovecats" by the Cure.

== Chart performance ==
In the UK, the single performed better than its predecessor, "Worst Case Scenario", although it did not match the success of "Worried About Ray" or "Goodbye Mr A". It debuted at number 64 on the UK Singles Chart via download sales alone before eventually peaking at number 24 two weeks later. It had a run of 10 weeks in the UK top 100.

== Music video ==
The first showing of the video was on Channel 4 on 22 March 2008. The video was shot at Dickens World, directed by the directing duo Diamond Dogs (a.k.a. Phil Sansom and Olly Williams) and is set in London in the 1800s.

== Track listing ==
UK and European CD single

1. "Cops and Robbers"
2. "Goodbye Mr A" (live from Shepherd's Bush Empire)

== Charts ==
| Chart (2008) | Peak position |
|---|---|
| Scottish Singles Sales (Official Charts) | 30 |
| UK Singles (Official Charts) | 24 |
