= Moving (Supergrass song) =

1999 single by Supergrass

Single by Supergrass

from the album Supergrass
- B-side: "You Too Can Play Alright"; "Believer"; "Faraway" (acoustic)
- Released: 6 September 1999
- Studio: Sawmills (Golant, England); Ridge Farm (Rusper, England)
- Length: 4:29
- Label: Parlophone
- Songwriters: Supergrass; Rob Coombes
- Producers: Supergrass; John Cornfield

Supergrass singles chronology
| "Pumping on Your Stereo" (1999) | "Moving" (1999) | "Mary" (1999) |

"Moving" is a song by English rock band Supergrass from their eponymous third album (1999). Released as a single in September 1999, "Moving" reached number nine on the UK Singles Chart, becoming Supergrass's last top-10 hit. In addition, it peaked at number 14 in Finland, where it is the band's sole top-20 hit, and number 81 in the Netherlands. The song later appeared on their greatest hits compilation Supergrass Is 10 (2004).

B-Side "You Too Can Play Alright" is an instructional demonstration on how to play "Alright" on the guitar using a replica backing track, in the style of tutorials included on cover-mounted CDs from guitar magazines of the era. It is not performed by Supergrass.

== Music video ==
Directed by Nick Gordon, the video, like the song, is intended to depict the tedium of touring. The passing of time is shown by the change of outfits the band are wearing, their slight changes in appearance, the selection of different hotel rooms they are seen in, and the assortment of hotel room keys displayed. Footage is sped up and slowed down, and scenes are rewound and repeated to add to the film's effect.

== Track listings ==
UK CD1

1. "Moving"
2. "You Too Can Play Alright"
3. "Pumping on Your Stereo" (CD ROM video)

UK CD2 and cassette single

1. "Moving"
2. "Believer"
3. "Faraway" (acoustic version)

UK limited-edition 7-inch blue vinyl single

A. "Moving"
B. "Believer"

European CD single

1. "Moving"
2. "Believer"
3. "Faraway" (acoustic version)
4. "You Too Can Play Alright"

== Credits and personnel ==
Credits are taken from the Supergrass album booklet.

Studios

- Recorded at Sawmills Studios (Golant, England) and Ridge Farm Studios (Rusper, England)

Personnel

- Supergrass – writing, production
  - Gaz Coombes – vocals, guitar
  - Mick Quinn – bass, vocals
  - Danny Goffey – drums, vocals
  - Rob Coombes – writing, keyboards
- Satin Singh – extra percussion
- Gavyn Wright – strings
- Patrick Kiernan – violin
- Boguslaw Kostecki – violin
- Jackie Shave – violin
- Bill Benham – viola
- Andrew Parker – viola
- Martin Loveday – cello
- Frank Schaefer – cello
- John Cornfield – production, mixing

== Charts ==
| Chart (1999) | Peak position |
|---|---|
| Europe (Eurochart Hot 100) | 39 |
| Finland (Suomen virallinen lista) | 14 |
| Netherlands (Dutch Top 40 Tipparade) | 11 |
| Netherlands (Single Top 100) | 81 |
| Scottish Singles Sales (Official Charts) | 8 |
| UK Singles (Official Charts) | 9 |

== Certifications ==
| Region | Certification | Certified units/sales |
|---|---|---|
| United Kingdom (BPI) | Silver | 200,000^{‡} |
^{‡} Sales+streaming figures based on certification alone.

== Release history ==
| Region | Date | Format(s) | Label(s) | Ref. |
|---|---|---|---|---|
| United Kingdom | 6 September 1999 | CD; cassette | Parlophone | |
| United Kingdom | 13 September 1999 | 7-inch vinyl | Parlophone | |
| United States | 5 September 2000 | Alternative radio | Parlophone; Island | |
