= Rebel in You =

Single by Supergrass

from the album Diamond Hoo Ha
- B-side: "Car Crash"
- Released: 30 June 2008
- Recorded: 2007
- Genre: Rock
- Length: 4:39
- Label: Supergrass Records
- Songwriter(s): Gaz Coombes; Danny Goffey; Mick Quinn; Rob Coombes
- Producer(s): Nick Launay

Supergrass singles chronology
"Bad Blood" (2008)	"Rebel in You" (2008)

"Rebel in You" is a song by the British rock band Supergrass. It is the third single from the album Diamond Hoo Ha, and is the band's final single release. "Rebel in You" with B Side "Car Crash" was limited to 1500 copies on 7" white vinyl only, and was released on 30 June 2008, via Supergrass Records. (The release date and distribution, however, were delayed past 30 June, due to a problem at the record pressing plant.)

The single is only available for mail-order purchase from the website Supergrass Records, with the first two hundred copies ordered being signed by the band. The single was planned to be distributed by Parlophone, but EMI refused to fund its release or the creation of an accompanying video. The single cover continues the trend of depicting a gorilla's hand.

== Track listing ==
Limited edition white 7" R6753

1. "Rebel in You" – 4:39
2. "Car Crash" – 3:19
