= Worst Case Scenario (song) =

Single by The Hoosiers

from the album The Trick to Life
- Released: January 7, 2008
- Recorded: 2007
- Genre: Punk rock, post-punk revival
- Length: 2:35

The Hoosiers singles chronology
"Goodbye Mr A" (2007)	"Worst Case Scenario" (2008)	"Cops and Robbers" (2008)

"Worst Case Scenario" is the third single by the English indie band The Hoosiers from their 2007 #1 album The Trick to Life. It has been admitted by lead man Irwin on the band's website that it is one of the band's favourite songs.

== History ==
The song received its first airplay on Radio 1 and the single was released 7 January 2008. However, it made a surprisingly disappointing impact in the UK Singles Chart. After The Hoosiers had already had two UK Top 5 singles, this single was to miss the UK Top 75 altogether, only peaking just outside that area at #76. However, the single's release also boosted The Trick to Life back into the UK Top 5 in the UK Albums Chart on 27 January 2008.

The video shows the band playing in a dark wooden cabin where things aren't as they seem. The song is about being in love with being miserable.

'Worst Case Scenario' is one of our favourites. The lyrics describe the perfect pessimist, yet in typical Hoosier style, the melody is as upbeat and 'feel good' as your drunken nan on her birthday.

— Irwin Sparkes, Hoosiers Website

== Chart positions ==
Chart (2008)	Peak position
UK Singles Chart	76

== Track listing ==
1. Worst Case Scenario
2. Ruby Blue
