= Grace (Supergrass song) =

2002 single by Supergrass

Single by Supergrass

from the album Life on Other Planets
- B-side: "Velvetine"
- Released: 16 September 2002
- Length: 2:32
- Label: Parlophone
- Songwriter: Supergrass
- Producer: Tony Hoffer

Supergrass singles chronology
"Never Done Nothing Like That Before" (2002)	"Grace" (2002)	"Seen the Light" (2002)

"Grace" is a song by Britpop band Supergrass. It was the second single to be released from Life on Other Planets (2002), the band's fourth studio album. It was released on 16 September 2002 and reached number 13 on the UK Singles Chart. Unlike the previous single, "Never Done Nothing Like That Before", a vinyl-only release, it was released on all major formats.

== Background ==
Gaz Coombes explained the meaning of the song:

"This one came from the daughter of Chris Difford. Part of the record was done in the small studio right behind his home. While recording, we often got visited by his daughters. No, not that kind! They're really sweet children. Kids in the studio just add to the right atmosphere. You can do great jams with them. That's how 'Grace' developed.

One of these girls always carried a small money box around. Save The Money For The Children, it says. One day, Danny came in drunk, and started rambling on a piano, shouting all kinds of weird lyrics. So, we used the line from the money box, and thought: that will do for the B Side. But once we started recording it for real, it became better and better, and it's even our new single now!. Yeah, things can go truly odd."

== Music video ==
The video for "Grace" was directed by Dom and Nic, and shows Supergrass performing the song, in a rundown rehearsal room, whilst a ten-year-old girl spies through the window, and tries to produce the group, as they play. The idea was to create a "surreal spiritualist video."

== Track listings ==
UK CD1

1. "Grace"
2. "Velvetine"
3. "Electric Cowboy"
4. "Grace" (video)

UK CD2

1. "Grace"
2. "Tishing in Windows (Kicking Down Doors)"
3. "That Old Song"

UK limited edition pink 7-inch single

A. "Grace"
B. "Velvetine"

== Charts ==
Chart (2002)	Peak position
Europe (Eurochart Hot 100)	50
Ireland (IRMA)	38
Norway (VG-lista)	18
Scottish Singles Sales (Official Charts)	13
UK Singles (Official Charts)	13

== Release history ==
Region	Date	Format(s)	Label(s)	Ref.
United Kingdom	16 September 2002	7-inch vinyl; CD	Parlophone	
Australia	30 September 2002	CD	Parlophone	
