= Road to Rouen =

Studio album by Supergrass
- Released: 15 August 2005
- Recorded: 2004–2005
- Studio: Studio St. Mard, Rouen, France
- Genre: Alternative rock; art rock; psychedelic
- Length: 35:19
- Label: Parlophone
- Producer: Supergrass

Supergrass chronology
Supergrass Is 10 (2004)	Road to Rouen (2005)	Diamond Hoo Ha (2008)

Singles from Road to Rouen
- 1. "St. Petersburg" Released: 8 August 2005; 2. "Low C" Released: 24 October 2005; 3. "Fin" Released: 2 January 2006

Road to Rouen is the fifth studio album by the English rock band Supergrass. The album was released in the UK on 15 August 2005 by Parlophone, and in the US on 27 September 2005 by Capitol Records. The title refers to the city in northern France where the album was recorded, as well as the 1978 album Road to Ruin by punk rock band the Ramones.

Road to Rouen was a difficult album for the band for personal reasons, including Danny Goffey's tabloid ordeal and the death of Gaz and Rob Coombes' mother. The album reflected a rough period for the band and was oriented towards longer, looser, more orchestral material. The record was highly acclaimed and well received by most fans of the band; it reached number 9 on the UK Albums Chart. Three singles were released from the album: "St. Petersburg" in August 2005, which peaked on the UK singles chart at number 22; "Low C" in October 2005, which peaked at number 52; and "Fin" in January 2006, which failed to enter the Top 100.

== Recording ==
In 2004, the band opted to move away from Sawmills Studio in Cornwall, where their first three albums had been recorded, and settled at Studio St. Mard, a converted barn in Rouen, Normandy. Supergrass claimed to have been more "focused" despite the rural surroundings and rudimentary recording equipment. Aside from their traditional instrumentation, the band used zithers, ukuleles, brass, strings, and a drum machine. The album's first single, "St. Petersburg", was recorded in one take and features no overdubs. Drummer Danny Goffey said of the album's more acoustic, streamlined recording: "It was a kind of conscious decision to make an album that didn't have a three-minute single, something that had more of a mellow vibe about it. There have been those obscure tracks that have been on the albums that no one probably had heard, because people just buy our singles or see just what's on the charts or on the radio. So yeah, we wanted to make sure that that side of us come out of us a bit more, you know, and that we didn't just pick some radio friendly song to release."

In a 2008 interview, bassist Mick Quinn said the introspection and orchestration of the album was "almost entirely" a direct reaction to the death of the Coombes brothers' mother, as well as Danny Goffey's tabloid ordeal. "Some of it was a reaction to other bad stuff that was going on," said Quinn. "I don't think anyone was in the mood to release another set of "Alright"-style jovial pop songs. Everyone was in a very stern frame of mind. Danny had a lot of personal stuff going on, thanks to the adult tabloid media. He was really messed up. You have to make the most of a bad situation though, and you try and express yourself through your music. It would have been a lie to try and do 'up' music at that point. The lyrics probably were commercial suicide though – it didn't sell particularly well... but I'm more proud that it actually exists than if it didn't."

== Artwork ==
The front cover photo depicts a cattle bridge near Lefaux, France, that crosses the A16 autoroute, part of the route between Boulogne and Rouen. It was taken at dusk using a Canon EOS 350D set to a 10-second exposure as a lorry passed under the bridge. (the photography is credited to Mick Quinn and Paul Wilson). The inner photo was taken by Pierre Olivier Margerand (studio engineer) and shows the keyboard and drum set up in the live room of Studio St. Mard. Overall album design was by graphic company Traffic and Mick Quinn.

== Critical reception ==
Professional ratings
Aggregate scores
Source	Rating
Metacritic	73/100
Review scores
Source	Rating
AllMusic	4.5/5 stars
Drowned in Sound	3/10
The Guardian	5/5 stars
Mojo	4/5 stars
NME	7/10
Pitchfork	7.2/10
PopMatters	7/10
Q	3/5 stars
Uncut	4/5 stars
Under the Radar	9/10

Road to Rouen was released to generally favourable reviews. At Metacritic, which assigns a normalised rating out of 100 based on reviews from mainstream critics, the album has received a score of 73, based on 22 reviews. Stephen Thomas Erlewine of AllMusic awarded the album 4.5 out of 5 stars, and said of the album, "...there's a mastery of tone, as the group creates a warm, trippy, late-night vibe and then never lets it flag over the course of nine songs." Erlewine then hailed the album as "a terrific little record" and concluded, "Supergrass have found new things to do with their sound without getting self-consciously mature or middlebrow." John Murphy of MusicOMH lavished the album with praise, stating that Road to Rouen "adds up to the sound of a band developing and maturing nicely, without ever losing sight of what made them so great in the first place." By contrast, Jack Smith of the BBC was more critical of the album, concluding that, "Supergrass have outlasted most of their contemporaries and still have it in them to make a truly amazing masterpiece. Unfortunately Road to Rouen is not quite it."

== Track listing ==
All tracks are written by Supergrass.

Road to Rouen track listing
No.	Title	Length
1.	"Tales of Endurance (Parts 4, 5 & 6)"	5:31
2.	"St. Petersburg"	3:09
3.	"Sad Girl"	3:37
4.	"Roxy"	6:17
5.	"Coffee in the Pot"	1:49
6.	"Road to Rouen"	3:51
7.	"Kick in the Teeth"	3:36
8.	"Low C"	4:16
9.	"Fin"	3:11

== Personnel ==
- Gaz Coombes – vocals, guitar
- Mick Quinn – bass, vocals
- Danny Goffey – drums
- Robert Coombes – keyboards
- Written and produced by Supergrass
- Engineered by Pierre Olivier Margerand
- Mixed by Michael Ilbert, except:
  - Tracks 1 and 4 mixed by Michael Ilbert and Supergrass
  - Track 5 mixed by Pierre Olivier Margerand
- Strings and horns arranged by Simon Hale and Supergrass
- Conducted by Simon Hale
- Backing singers on "Low C": Andy Lovegrove, Laura Capillaire, and Jules Francis
- Arranged and recorded by Andy Lovegrove
- Photography by P. Wilson, M. Quinn, and P.O.M.

== Charts ==
Chart performance for Road to Rouen
Chart (2005)	Peak position
Australian Albums (ARIA)	67
Austrian Albums (Ö3 Austria)	73
Belgian Albums (Ultratop Flanders)	88
Belgian Albums (Ultratop Wallonia)	57
Dutch Albums (Album Top 100)	63
French Albums (SNEP)	85
Irish Albums (IRMA)	29
Italian Albums (FIMI)	76
UK Albums (OCC)	9
US Heatseekers Albums (Billboard)	41

== Release history ==
Release history and formats for Road to Rouen
Country	Date	Label	Format	Catalogue #
United Kingdom	15 August 2005	Parlophone	CD	00946 333334 2 0
United Kingdom	15 August 2005	Parlophone	LP	00946 333334 1 3
Japan	7 September 2005	Toshiba EMI	eCD (includes "St. Petersburg" video)	TOCP-66449
United States	27 September 2005	Capitol	CD	CDP 0946 3 38392 2 9
Various	30 November 2018	Echo/BMG	CD (reissue in cardboard sleeve)	BMGCAT332CD
