= The Illusion of Safety (The Hoosiers album) =

Studio album by the Hoosiers
- Released: 16 August 2010
- Recorded: Angelic Studios (Northamptonshire, England); Long Island Studios (London, England); RAK Studios (London, England)
- Genres: Pop rock, indie pop, indie rock
- Length: 45:48
- Label: RCA
- Producers: Toby Smith, Max Dingel, Jay Reynolds, Al Clay

The Hoosiers chronology
| The Trick to Life (2007) | The Illusion of Safety (2010) | Bumpy Ride (2011) |

The Illusion of Safety is the second album released by the London based indie pop band the Hoosiers. It was released in the UK on 16 August 2010 and was preceded by the lead single, "Choices" which was released on 1 August 2010. The second single taken from the album was originally expected to be "Unlikely Hero", but Irwin has stated on the Hoosiers' Twitter feed that this plan has been changed, and stated that the band "will let you know what soon."

The album was not as successful as the band's first album, The Trick to Life (2007), which peaked at #1 on the UK Albums Chart. The Illusion of Safety did, however, enter the chart at #10 in the UK, its only chart appearance globally. By 11 April 2011, it had sold 25,872 copies in the UK.

== Album information ==
The writing for The Illusion of Safety began after the success of the band's first album. The band had been one of the best known bands in the UK in 2007 with the success of the singles "Goodbye Mr. A" and "Worried About Ray". The Illusion of Safety was released three years later.

The band recorded the album in various locations.

== Singles ==
- "Choices" was released as the first single from the album on 1 August 2010. The single entered the UK Singles Chart at number 11. The video of "Choices" was made by the directing duo "Diamond Dogs", who also directed the Hoosiers in "Worried about Ray", "Goodbye Mr A" and "Cops and Robbers".

"Unlikely Hero" was originally announced as the second single by Irwin in an interview with Digital Spy. It was due to be released on 17 October. On 14 October 2010, Irwin announced on The Hoosiers' Twitter page that there was a change of plan and it would no longer be released as a single.

- "Bumpy Ride" was announced on the band's Twitter page as the second single on 20 December. It was released on 27 March 2011.

== Track listing ==
| No. | Title | Writer(s) | Length |
|---|---|---|---|
| 1. | "Choices" | The Hoosiers, Toby Smith | 2:48 |
| 2. | "Bumpy Ride" | The Hoosiers, Jodi Marr, George Norriega | 3:59 |
| 3. | "Who Said Anything (About Falling in Love)?" | The Hoosiers, Eg White | 3:05 |
| 4. | "Unlikely Hero" | The Hoosiers | 3:50 |
| 5. | "Lovers in My Head" | The Hoosiers | 3:39 |
| 6. | "Live by the Ocean" | The Hoosiers | 4:03 |
| 7. | "Devil's in the Detail" | The Hoosiers | 3:13 |
| 8. | "Glorious" | The Hoosiers | 4:46 |
| 9. | "Made to Measure" | The Hoosiers | 4:21 |
| 10. | "Giddy Up" | The Hoosiers | 2:59 |
| 11. | "Sarajevo" | The Hoosiers | 5:44 |
| 12. | "Little Brutes" | The Hoosiers | 3:21 |

iTunes bonus track
| No. | Title | Writer(s) | Length |
|---|---|---|---|
| 13. | "Say Hello, Wave Goodbye" | Marc Almond | 3:42 |

== Charts ==
| Chart (2010) | Peak position |
|---|---|
| UK Albums (Official Charts) | 10 |

== Personnel ==
The Hoosiers

- Irwin Sparkes – lead vocals, electric guitar, acoustic guitar, bass guitar on track 6, synthesizers on tracks 6 and 12, backing vocals on all tracks, programming on tracks 3, 4, 5, 7, 11 and 12
- Martin Skarendahl – bass guitar, electric guitar on track 3, acoustic guitar on tracks 3 and 5, percussion, backing vocals on tracks 4, 7 and 11, programming on tracks 3, 4, 5, 7, 11 and 12
- Alphonso Sharland – drums, lead vocals on track 7, percussion, backing vocals on tracks 4, 7, 8 and 11, programming on tracks 3, 4, 5, 7, 11 and 12

Additional personnel

- Toby Smith – production on tracks 1, 2, 4, 5, 6, 7, 8, 9, 11 and 12, programming on tracks 6, 8, and 11, synthesizers on tracks 1, 2, 4, 5, 6, 7, 8, 9 and 11, percussion, backing vocals on tracks 1, 4 and 8
- Max Dingel – production on tracks 1, 2, 4, 5, 6, 7, 8, 9, 11, and 12, engineering on tracks 1, 2, 4, 5, 6, 7, 8, 9, 11 and 12, programming on tracks 1, 4, 6, 8 and 11
- Jay Reynolds – production on tracks 1, 4, 8, 9 and 10, engineering on tracks 1, 4, 8, 9 and 10, programming on tracks 1, 4, 8, 9 and 10, mixing on tracks 8, 9 and 10
- Al Clay – production on tracks 2 and 3, engineering on tracks 2 and 3, programming on tracks 2 and 3, mixing on track 3, percussion, backing vocals on track 3
- Cenzo Townshend – mixing on tracks 1, 2 and 4
- Tom Fuller – engineering on tracks 1, 2, 4, 5, 6, 7, 8, 9, 11 and 12, mixing on tracks 5, 6, 7, 11 and 12
- Sam Miller – mixing on tracks 5, 6, 7, 11 and 12
- Adie Kaye – engineering on tracks 2 and 3, mixing on track 3
- Neil Comber – mixing on tracks 1, 2 and 4
- Sean Julliard – mixing on tracks 1, 2 and 4
- John Davis – mastering on all tracks
- Sam Swallow – piano, dulcitone, synthesizers on tracks 1, 2, 3, 4, 5, 6, 8, 9, 10 and 11, percussion, trumpet on track 10, trombone on track 7, brass arranging on tracks 8 and 9, backing vocals on tracks 4, 5, 8 and 11
- Dee Clay – backing vocals on track 2
- Johnny Douglas – synthesizers on track 2
- Paul Clavis – percussion on tracks 8 and 9
- Barney Philpott – trombone on tracks 8 and 9
- Seb Philpott – trumpet on tracks 8 and 9
- Andrew Welford – Post production on tracks 1, 2, 4 and 6
- Eg White – string programming on track 3
