= Pumping on Your Stereo =

1999 single by Supergrass

Single by Supergrass

from the album Supergrass
- B-side: "You'll Never Walk Again"; "Sick"; "What a Shame"; "Lucky (No Fear)"
- Released: 24 May 1999
- Studio: Sawmills (Golant, UK); Ridge Farm (Rusper, UK)
- Length: 3:21
- Label: Parlophone
- Songwriters: Supergrass; Rob Coombes
- Producers: Supergrass; John Cornfield

Supergrass singles chronology
| "Late in the Day" (1997) | "Pumping on Your Stereo" (1999) | "Moving" (1999) |

"Pumping on Your Stereo" is a song by Supergrass, released as their first single from their self-titled third album (1999) on 24 May 1999. The single reached No. 11 on the UK Singles Chart and in New Zealand. It also peaked at No. 13 on the Canadian RPM Top 30 Rock Report in May 2000. In October 2011, NME placed it at No. 124 on its list "150 Best Tracks of the Past 15 Years".

== Background ==
Bassist Mick Quinn said in regard to the recording of the song: "There were certain instances where Danny didn't hit the snare [drum] loud enough so we all had to clap over the snare. In the end it sounds like [David] Bowie."

Drummer Danny Goffey explained the history behind the song: "It came about when we were just in our rehearsal studio and we all started singing it over three chords. It's quite easy to play. The easier the song is to play, the better we play it. It just happened really quickly. It was one of those songs that just comes together in 10 minutes."

Though the title of the song is "Pumping on Your Stereo," the band thought it funny to actually sing the word "humping" in place of "pumping," and this is how it is thus heard on the recording. In live performances, the band has sung both "pumping" and "humping". Supergrass can be heard applauding themselves and whooping at the end of the recording, at the end, Goffey asks, "Can we go home now?"

== Single artwork ==
Created by Nick Veasey, the single artwork is a photograph of the internal workings of a stereo, in fitting with the song's title. The second CD of the CD release has the same cover design as the other formats, apart from the colours, which were altered to produce a more pinkish hue with black text.

== Music video ==
The video, directed by Hammer & Tongs, shows the band with their heads on Muppet-like puppet bodies, playing equally Muppet-like instruments in a black room.

Floating pink feather boas, Moai heads and fireworks are also seen through the duration of the video. The band members remove their heads from their bodies in the video, and as the song finishes, Goffey's head can be seen being knocked off of his shoulders and flying across the stage until it hits a speaker and falls. At the very end, he moans "Can we go home now?" in sync with the song.

Quinn described how the video came about: "It's pretty straightforward really. We couldn't use our regular directors [Dom and Nic] because they were too busy doing another video. We looked around for some other directors, and we came up with Gus Jennings, who had worked with other people like Bentley Rhythm Ace. The puppets was his idea. It looked like the most interesting thing to do."

== Track listings ==
UK CD1

1. "Pumping on Your Stereo" (single version)
2. "You'll Never Walk Again"
3. "Sick"

UK CD2

1. "Pumping on Your Stereo" (single version)
2. "What a Shame"
3. "Lucky (No Fear)"

UK 7-inch single

A. "Pumping on Your Stereo"
B. "You'll Never Walk Again"

Japanese CD single

1. "Pumping on Your Stereo" (single version)
2. "You'll Never Walk Again"
3. "What a Shame"
4. "Sick"

"That (You'll Never Walk Again) was just a demo we did on our eight track," says Goffey. "It's just the three of us around the mic. It's about the riots at France '98, the World Cup. It's just a really stupid song. It just happened. Probably either Gaz or Micky started singing it and we all joined in. Then we overdubbed some stupid cowbells on it."

== Credits and personnel ==
Credits are taken from the Supergrass album booklet.

Studios

- Recorded at Sawmills Studios (Golant, UK) and Ridge Farm Studios (Rusper, UK)

Personnel

- Supergrass – writing, production
  - Gaz Coombes – vocals, guitar
  - Mick Quinn – bass, vocals
  - Danny Goffey – drums, vocals
  - Rob Coombes – writing, keyboards
- Satin Singh – extra percussion
- John Cornfield – production, mixing

== Charts ==
| Chart (1999–2000) | Peak position |
|---|---|
| Canada Rock/Alternative (RPM) | 13 |
| Europe (Eurochart Hot 100) | 48 |
| Ireland (IRMA) | 29 |
| Netherlands (Dutch Top 40 Tipparade) | 13 |
| Netherlands (Single Top 100) | 70 |
| New Zealand (Recorded Music NZ) | 11 |
| Scottish Singles Sales (Official Charts) | 13 |
| UK Singles (Official Charts) | 11 |

== Certifications ==
| Region | Certification | Certified units/sales |
|---|---|---|
| United Kingdom (BPI) | Silver | 200,000^{‡} |
^{‡} Sales+streaming figures based on certification alone.

== Release history ==
| Region | Date | Format(s) | Label(s) | Ref. |
|---|---|---|---|---|
| United Kingdom | 24 May 1999 | CD; cassette | Parlophone | |
| Japan | 7 July 1999 | CD | Parlophone; EMI | |
| United States | 21 March 2000 | Alternative radio | Island; Parlophone | |
