= Low C (song) =

Single by Supergrass

from the album Road to Rouen
- B-side: "Roxy" (live acoustic)
- Released: 24 October 2005
- Length: 4:18
- Label: Parlophone
- Songwriter: Supergrass
- Producer: Supergrass

Supergrass singles chronology
"St. Petersburg" (2005)	"Low C" (2005)	"Fin" (2006)

“Low C” is a song from British rock band Supergrass’s fifth studio album, Road to Rouen (2005). It was released on 24 October 2005 as the second single from the album and peaked at number 52 in the United Kingdom, lasting only one week on the UK Singles Chart.

== Music video ==
The music video was shot at Weeki Wachee Springs.

== Track listings ==
Limited edition seven-inch (R6675)

1. "Low C" – 4:18
2. "Roxy" (acoustic, live from Ronnie Scotts) – 3:45

CD (CDR6675)

1. "Low C" – 4:18
2. "Low C" (live from Oxford Playhouse) – 4:16

DVD (DVDR6675)

1. "Low C" – 4:18
2. "Lady Day and John Coltrane" (acoustic – live from Ronnie Scotts)
3. "Low C" (video) – 5:16
4. "St. Petersburg" (video) – 3:12
