= St. Petersburg (song) =

Single by Supergrass

from the album Road to Rouen
- B-side: "Kiss of Life" (live)
- Released: 8 August 2005
- Length: 3:09
- Label: Parlophone
- Songwriter: Supergrass
- Producer: Supergrass

Supergrass singles chronology
| "Kiss of Life" (2004) | "St. Petersburg" (2005) | "Low C" (2005) |

"St. Petersburg" is a song from British rock band Supergrass' fifth studio album, Road to Rouen (2005). It was released on 8 August 2005, as the first single from the album, and charted at number 22 on the UK Singles Chart. As of January 2022, it is their most recent UK Top 40 Hit. Borkur Sigthorsson directed the song's music video.

== Music video ==
The music video begins at the same time as the song starts, focusing on a shot of the microphone on its stand. Gaz Coombes then comes into view, singing the first line of the song, and the camera rotates slowly around the rest of the band. The video is set in a completely white room, with the band demurely dressed, and a distinct red wooden piano being played by Rob Coombes.

== Track listings ==
CD (CDR6670)

1. "St. Petersburg" – 3:13
2. "Kiss of Life" (live) – 4:01
3. "Bullet" (live) – 3:26

Limited-edition red 7-inch (R6670)

1. "St. Petersburg" – 3:13
2. "Kiss of Life" (live) – 4:01
