= Donna Hightower =

American singer-songwriter (1926–2013)

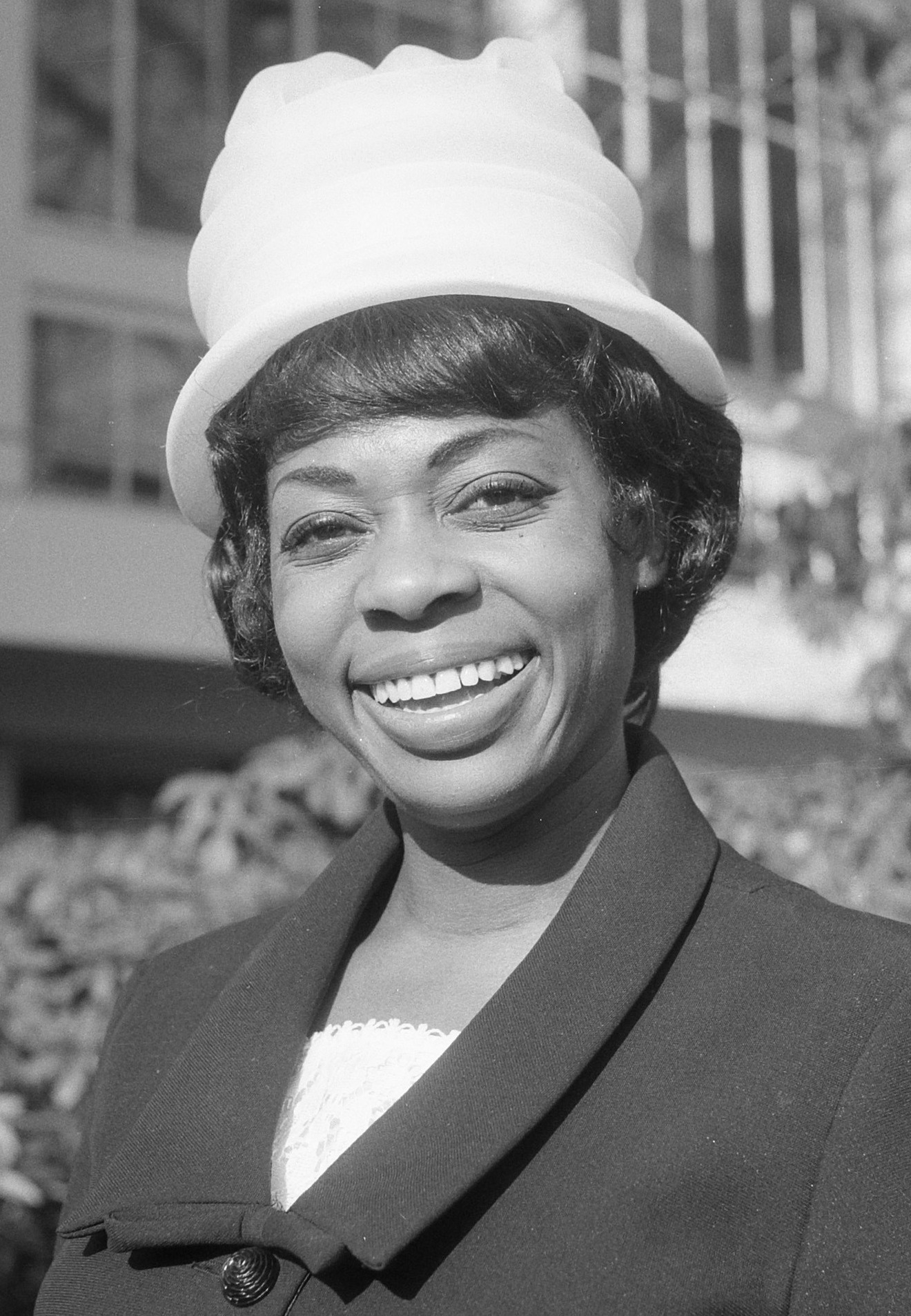
- Donna Hightower in 1964

Background information
- Also known as: Little Donna Hightower
- Born: Donna Lubertha Hightower; December 28, 1926; Caruthersville, Missouri, United States
- Died: August 19, 2013 (aged 86) Austin, Texas, United States
- Genres: R&B; soul; jazz
- Occupations: Singer, songwriter
- Years active: 1951–2013
- Labels: Decca; RPM; Capitol; Columbia

Donna Lubertha Hightower (Note: Researchers Bob Eagle and Eric LeBlanc give her birth name as Bertha LaDonna Hightower.) (December 28, 1926 – August 19, 2013) was an American R&B, soul and jazz singer and songwriter, who recorded and released albums for the Decca and Capitol labels. Later in her career she was based in Europe, where she had a hit in 1972 with "This World Today is a Mess."

== Biography ==
Donna Hightower was born in Caruthersville, Missouri, to a family of sharecroppers. She listened to singers such as Ella Fitzgerald, but never planned to have a singing career and by the age of 23 had been married, had two children, and divorced. While working in a diner in Chicago, Hightower was heard singing by Bob Tillman, a reporter with the Chicago Defender newspaper, who then won her a booking as a singer at the Strand Hotel. Initially billed as Little Donna Hightower, she won a recording contract with Decca Records and recorded her first single, "I Ain't In The Mood", in 1951.

During the mid-1950s, Hightower recorded R&B songs for RPM Records, often accompanied by the Maxwell Davis Orchestra, as on her 1955 version of "Hands Off". She toured widely in the US, with Louis Jordan, B.B. King, Johnny Mathis, Della Reese and others. While none of her records made the pop or R&B charts, she received good reviews, and her discs did perform well in Decca Record's own sales guides, with her "I Ain't In The Mood" ranking at No. 1 on their Sepia (race) charts.

By 1958, Hightower's career had slowed down, and she began working for a music publishing firm in New York City, recording demonstration records of new songs. Her version of "Light of Love" — later recorded by Peggy Lee — was heard by record producer Dave Cavanaugh, and as a result of his interest she was signed to Capitol Records.

Hightower recorded two albums for Capitol, including Take One! and Gee Baby, Ain't I Good To You?, both released in 1959. While noted for her "range and power, [she] was equally compelling doing sentimental, soft ballads."

== Move to Europe ==
In 1959, Hightower performed in England, France, Sweden and elsewhere in Europe, later performing with Quincy Jones, The Platters and Johnny Hallyday. She settled in France, then Belgium and finally in the late 1960s, in Madrid. In 1971 she won the Costa del Sol International Song Festival, following which she began recording in Spain for Columbia Records, although her songs were issued in much of Europe by Decca Records.

Hightower worked with singer Danny Daniel as a duo, Danny y Donna, and they had a hit in the country with "El Vals de las Mariposas". She also recorded solo, and her most successful record, "This World Today Is A Mess" ("Este Mundo es un Conflicto"), which she co-wrote, was an international hit — though not in the US, where it was not released, or in the UK — in 1972, reportedly selling 130,000 copies in Germany, 800,000 in France and over one million copies worldwide. Hightower is also known for the song "If You Hold My Hand", which was later sampled for the UK 2007 hit single "Handsfree" by Sonny J.

== Return to the United States ==
She returned to the US to live in semi-retirement in Austin, Texas, in 1990. Hightower was active in the Austin Chapter of the Gospel Music Workshop of America. She was a member of Calvary Baptist Church, and appeared on local radio programs. Her last performance in Spain was at a jazz festival in 2006. Hightower died in Austin in 2013 at the age of 86.

== Legacy ==
In 2008, electronica musician Sonny J released a remixed version of Hightower's song "If You Hold My Hand" entitled "Handsfree."

== Selected Discography ==
Decca Records

- "I Ain't In The Mood" (single - 1951)

RPM Records

- "He's My Baby" (single - 1955)

Capitol Records

- Take One (LP - 1958)
- Gee Baby, Ain't I Good To You (LP - 1959)

Guitarra Records

- "Soy Feliz" (single - 1970)

Columbia Records (In Spain, as Discos Columbia)

- "If You Hold My Hand" (single - 1971)
- "El Valz de las Mariposas" (Waltz of the Butterflies) (single - 1971)
- "This World Today is a Mess" (Este Mundo es un Conflicto) (single - 1972, LP - 1972)
- Here I Am (LP - 1973)
- "Don't you feel alone, sometimes" (single - 1973)
- I'm In Love with Love (LP - 1974)
- El Jazz y Donna Hightower (LP - 1975)

Mastervision Records

- Prima Donna (LP - 1985)
