= Sonny J =

English music producer

- Born: Sonnington James III; Liverpool, England
- Origin: Whitstable, Kent, England
- Genres: Hip-hop, electronica, trip hop
- Occupation(s): Musician, songwriter, turntablist
- Instrument(s): Turntables, keyboards, vocals
- Labels: Stateside Records

Sonny J, short for Sonnington James III, is an English electronic musician from Liverpool.

His debut single, "Can't Stop Moving", was brought out by Stateside Records in 2007. The track has been used frequently as background music on the X Factor and Britain's Got Talent. His second and third singles, "Enfant Terrible" and "Handsfree (If You Hold My Hand)" featuring Donna Hightower, were released on 9 June 2008, followed by his debut album Disastro the week after, on 16 June.

Sonny J was propelled into the mainstream music scene when a fan published a viral video, featuring The Jackson 5, on several well-known websites, before a demo version of "Can't Stop Moving" was played on BBC Radio 1. In September 2008, the song was re-issued with a remix by Mirwais Ahmadzaï, which gave Sonny J his first top 40 hit when it peaked at No. 40 in the UK Singles Chart. He was a member of the band Groundhog.

== Discography ==
=== Albums ===
- Disastro (2008)

=== Singles ===
- "Can't Stop Moving" (2007)
- "Enfant Terrible" (2008)
- "Handsfree (If You Hold My Hand)" (2008) – No. 77 UK
- "Can't Stop Moving (Mirwais Remix)" (2008) – No. 40 UK, No. 8 Japan
