= Never Done Nothing Like That Before =

Single by Supergrass

from the album Life on Other Planets
- Released: 1 July 2002
- Recorded: 5 November 2001
- Genre: Britpop; rock; pop
- Length: 2:00
- Label: Parlophone
- Songwriter: Supergrass
- Producer: Tony Hoffer

Supergrass singles chronology
"Mary" (1999)	"Never Done Nothing Like That Before" (2002)	"Grace" (2002)

"Never Done Nothing Like That Before" is a song by British band Supergrass, released as the first single from their fourth album Life on Other Planets in July 2002.

As a vinyl-only release with only 2500 copies, the single only reached number 75 on the UK Singles Chart. The single version is slightly longer than the album version as the end of the album's previous track (featuring fireworks being set off by Danny Goffey) is used as an introduction.

The website, Children of the Monkey Basket, explains the song in further detail: "First release of the century, and what a corker. We had the main riff for this kicking around for about five years, and ended up recording it third for the new album. Nice touches, include Dermot playing piano with a screwdriver, the Jackel on milk bottles, and Danny setting the studio alight with fireworks, as it was recorded on Guy Fawkes Night.”

== Track listing ==
Limited edition 7" R6583

1. "Never Done Nothing Like That Before" – 2:00
