= The News from Nowhere =

Studio album by the Hoosiers
- Released: 14 April 2014
- Genres: Indie rock, alternative rock
- Label: Crab Race Ltd.

The Hoosiers chronology
Bumpy Ride (2010)	The News from Nowhere (2014)	The Secret Service (2015)

The News from Nowhere is the third album released by the London-based indie pop band the Hoosiers. It was released on the 14 April 2014 after their departure from their record label. On 17 September 2013, The Hoosiers announced the planned release of their upcoming album "The News From Nowhere". This was accompanied by the release of the lead single, "Somewhere in the Distance". As the album was self-released in order to fund production, The Hoosiers asked for preorders in return for rewards such as signed merchandise and a mention in the album credits. The band stated:

“We're not a big record label with lots of money, though, so need to pay for the recording, manufacturing, adverts, videos, touring, promotion – all the stuff a label usually does – ourselves. This means that when we release an album, we give it 110%. Real blood, sweat, and tears. Personally, I don't think a lot of bands do that kind of thing anymore, certainly not in the successful indie rock scene.”

== Track listing ==
No.	Title	Writer(s)	Length
1.	"Somewhere in the Distance"	The Hoosiers	3:47
2.	"Make or Break (You Gotta Know)"	The Hoosiers	3:32
3.	"My Last Fight"	The Hoosiers	3:11
4.	"Fidget Brain"	The Hoosiers	3:00
5.	"Handsome Girls and Pretty Boys"	The Hoosiers	5:01
6.	"The News from Nowhere"	The Hoosiers	3:21
7.	"Rocket Star"	The Hoosiers	4:25
8.	"To the Lions"	The Hoosiers	3:26
9.	"Upset"	The Hoosiers	3:27
10.	"Weirdo"	The Hoosiers	4:49
11.	"Impossible Boy"	The Hoosiers	3:35
12.	"Nathan's Loft" (hidden track)	The Hoosiers	2:30

== Charts ==
Chart (2014)	Peak position
UK Albums (Official Charts)	96
UK Independent Albums (Official Charts)	23
