= Bad Blood (Supergrass song) =

Single by Supergrass

from the album Diamond Hoo Ha
- B-side: "Rough Knuckles"
- Released: 17 March 2008
- Recorded: 2007
- Studio: Hansa Studios, Berlin, Germany
- Genre: Rock
- Length: 3:03
- Label: Parlophone
- Songwriters: Gaz Coombes; Danny Goffey; Mick Quinn; Rob Coombes
- Producer: Nick Launay

Supergrass singles chronology
"Diamond Hoo Ha Man" (2008)	"Bad Blood" (2008)	"Rebel in You" (2008)

"Bad Blood" is the second single from British rock group Supergrass' sixth album, Diamond Hoo Ha. It was released on 17 March 2008, which was one week before the album's release date. The song is about a rough night out in Reykjavík, Iceland, as Gaz Coombes explains;

"We'd played the Airwaves festival, and it was about four in the morning, and right outside our bedroom window in Reykjavík there were loads of boozy scuffles. A really beautiful town, peaceful during the day – then it just went mental at night with drunken fights and shouting. I just thought the contrast was amazing. We carried on writing the lyrics later, using experiences we'd had, wandering around New York City at two in the morning, the worse for wear, and being excited by the dangers, but also being a bit naive. The big line in there is, "I don't believe that man needs God, thank God". Then it goes on: "I can't forget you, you're all I've got my love". This song is featured in Need for Speed: Undercover as one of the tracks used in the series.

Coombes is also quoted as saying that "Bad Blood" is about violence and paranoia in the 21st century.

== Charts ==
The song performed badly in the charts due to lack of airplay; upon its first week of release it only managed to reach #73. The next week, it dropped out of the top 100 completely.

== Music video ==
The accompanying video to Bad Blood won the Best Rock Video award at the 2008 UK Music Video Awards.

The video features the band playing in a stereotypical English pub with the camera fixed on certain objects as they move, creating a swaying sort of effect. The opening scene is that of a reel of recording tape spinning which then pans out to the band themselves. The camera alternates between scenes of a pendulum clock, a mechanical wind-up metronome, a Newton's cradle, a swinging framed picture of Danny Goffey and a framed picture of Gaz Coombes which falls to the floor and smashes. The chandelier above them is also swinging throughout.

After the middle eight, the band put on masks that emulate their own faces, and Danny plays his bass drum barefoot. They remove these masks as the chorus begins again, then Gaz kicks over his microphone stand, and smashes his guitar (now replaced with one made from gingerbread). Rob Coombes follows suit by pushing over his keyboard, which is now made of toast, and Danny punches through the skin of his snare drum to reveal that it is in fact filled with popcorn. Mick Quinn joins the rest by smashing his own gingerbread guitar as Gaz continues to thrash his instrument against the floor as well, thus ending the video.

First, Gaz Coombes plays his red vintage 1960s Burns/Baldwin Bison guitar, but when it is replaced with gingerbread, it takes on a distinctly more Telecaster shape. Mick Quinn, however, uses the same black Rickenbacker 4003 bass throughout.

Keith Schofield, the director of the video explains: "We shot everything on a locked-off camera on 35mm and then transferred to HD, We then tracked in a standard-definition frame on top of that HD, and moved the footage through that cropped window. All the action was tracked in post."

=== Personnel ===
- Production Company: HSI London
- Director: Keith Schofield
- Producer: Juliette Larthe
- Production Manager: Dom Thomas
- Director of Photography: Magni Agustsson
- Art Director: Sarah Jensen
- Online Producer: Keith Schofield
- Editor: Keith Schofield
- Commissioner: Joceline Gabriel

== Track listing ==
Enhanced CD CDR6755 / DD

1. "Bad Blood" – 3:03
2. "Beat It" (Michael Jackson; Diamond Hoo Ha Men Xfm London Session) – 2:42
3. "Bad Blood" (Diamond Hoo Ha Men version) – 3:00
4. "Bad Blood" (video) – 3:01

Limited edition caramel 7" R6755

1. "Bad Blood" – 3:03
2. "Rough Knuckles" – 3:25
