= Life on Other Planets =

Studio album by Supergrass
- Released: 30 September 2002
- Recorded: October 2001–March 2002
- Studio: Mayfair, Heliocentric, Rockfield
- Genre: Power pop
- Length: 40:38
- Label: Parlophone
- Producer: Tony Hoffer

Supergrass chronology
Supergrass (1999)	Life on Other Planets (2002)	Supergrass Is 10 (2004)

Singles from Life on Other Planets
- 1. "Never Done Nothing Like That Before" Released: 1 July 2002; 2. "Grace" Released: 16 September 2002; 3. "Seen the Light" Released: 27 January 2003; 4. "Rush Hour Soul" Released: 4 August 2003

Life on Other Planets is the fourth studio album by English alternative rock band Supergrass. It is the first album that includes Rob Coombes as an official member of the band, and originally went under the working title of Get Lost. It peaked at number 9 on the UK Albums Chart.

== Background ==
The band hired an outside producer, Tony Hoffer, for the record, having felt that their last release, Supergrass, lacked some of the urgency of their previous albums: "He helped us keep the takes quite short and sweet", says Danny Goffey. "We really didn't mess around because he kept us moving. If we had done it on our own again, we'd just get really analytical and start crying and trying to mend things that weren't broken."

== Composition and lyrics ==
The naming of the album was influenced by this excursion, but also by a telescope which qualified astrophysicist and keyboard player Rob Coombes, would bring with him to the recording studio in order to see the planets; "...we got fascinated on everything above us and came up with the title," explained Mick Quinn. The band claim that much of the inspiration for this album was gleaned from a "working holiday" in the Côte d'Azur, Southern France together, listening to the French radio station Nostalgie and watching Carl Sagan documentaries on the cosmos. Carl Sagan and Douglas Adams are in fact mentioned on the reverse of Life on Other Planets under a list of people Supergrass would like to thank.

Musically, the sound of the album has been described as power pop, drawing comparison to the work of the Sweet. Coombes employed the use of an Elvis Presley impersonation on "Seen the Light" and "Evening of the Day", while on "Brecon Beacons" he sounded closer to Marc Bolan of T. Rex. AllMusic reviewer Stephen Thomas Erlewine said it found the "perfect balance of the sensibility and humor of I Should Coco with the musicality and casual virtuosity of In It for the Money". Pitchfork contributor Joe Tangari referred to it as a "tour of 70s British rock, but more to the point, it's a summary of Supergrass' own career, merging all of the band's many mutations into one decisive sound". In a review for Rolling Stone, journalist Greg Kot wrote that throughout the album, there are "chirping birds, bleating sheep, Munchkin choirs, fumbled tambourines and an Elvis imitator". He also mentioned that they melded together the better aspects of the 1970s, such as Electric Light Orchestra, glam rock and Paul McCartney's solo career, with the "punk holy trinity of speed, noise and more speed".

Tangari said "Za", the album's opening track, was a standard Supergrass "rocker stuffed with big, crashing Mick Ronson riffage, but backed by strange, wordless vocals". "Rush Hour Soul" is a garage rock track with influences from progressive rock. "Evening of the Day" includes a reference to "All the Way Home" by Spinal Tap, and is followed by the ska track "Brecon Beacons". The country rock song "Evening of the Day" mixes Small Faces-type Brit-rock with blues in the vein of B.B. King. "Prophet 15" evoked "Let 'Em In" (1976) by McCartney's Wings; Spin's Alex Pappademas wrote that it has the spirits of "Oscar Wilde, John Belushi, and Che Guevara visit Coombes while he's blowing out his mind in a car". Tangari said that "Run", the album's closing track, had "glossy harmonies and squiggly effects [which] pick up on the spacier bits of the 1970s and squash them into a glowing, noise-addled coda". It concludes with a looping synthesizer part that recalled the opening moments of the album.

The album was debuted at Meltdown festival in London's Royal Festival Hall on 28 June 2002, the edition curated by David Bowie.

== Reception ==
Professional ratings
Aggregate scores
Source	Rating
Metacritic	74/100
Review scores
Source	Rating
AllMusic	4.5/5 stars
Blender	4/5 stars
Entertainment Weekly	A−
The Guardian	2/5 stars
NME	7/10
Pitchfork	7.6/10
Q	2/5 stars
Rolling Stone	3/5 stars
Spin	B
Uncut	4/5 stars

Life on Other Planets was met with generally favourable reviews from music critics. At Metacritic, which assigns a normalized rating out of 100 to reviews from mainstream publications, the album received an average score of 74, based on 21 reviews.

Some reviewers praised the band's energy and songwriting. Erlewine saw it as a "smashing return to form, an album giddy with the sheer pleasure of making music", adding that there "hasn't been an album that's this much fun in a long time". Entertainment Weekly 's Ken Tucker thought that the band "continues to evince range and spunk aplenty on Life on Other Planets". Blender writer Pat Blashill remarked that the majority of "these concise, supercatchy tunes are as unself-consciously traditional, and fun, as an undiscovered cache of British Invasion rock".

Other critics thought the band lacked ideas. Paul McNamee of NME wrote that "with so much riding" on the album, the band "take no chances, opening at full tilt with a volley of hits-in-waiting". While he "believe this to be the great album they've always threatened, Supergrass start to mug it up; they just can't help themselves". Tangari wrote that "on the one hand, there's an abundance of energy and some great songwriting; on the other, there's less focus here than on either of their previous two releases". The Guardian critic Dave Simpson acknowledged that it "harks back to the youthful effervescence of their debut - but the energy feels laboured", with its main issue being the "lack of ideas". Q writer David Quantick said that while it was "more varied than their last album," it featured "less rock than In It For The Money, it's a fiddly disappointment, as centreless as a B-sides compilation". Kot said the album's 12 tracks were "packed to bursting with the tension of too many ideas and too little time", mentioning that the band's "lack of commitment can get wearisome, and Life suffers without a guiding sense of personality, a point of view". Pappademas wrote that "unfortunately, Coombes seems to have the glam era's fuzzy-brained approach to pop song-writing nailed a bit too well". He suggested that for the next release, they should "leave their forebear' lazy lyricism back at ground control".

== Track listing ==
All tracks written by Supergrass (as Rob Coombes officially was a band member effective this album).

CD 5418002 Limited edition 12" (with free poster) 5418001

1. "Za" – 3:04
2. "Rush Hour Soul" – 2:55
3. "Seen the Light" – 2:25
4. "Brecon Beacons" – 2:56
5. "Can't Get Up" – 4:02
6. "Evening of the Day" – 5:18 The track is in fact a tribute to Spinal Tap song "All the Way Home", with the lyric "If she's not on that 3:15, then I'm gonna know what sorrow means."
7. "Never Done Nothing Like That Before" – 1:43
8. "Funniest Thing" – 2:29
9. "Grace" – 2:30
10. "La Song" – 3:43
11. "Prophet 15" – 4:05
12. "Run" – 5:28

CD TOCP 66003 (Japan only) The Japanese release of the album has the same track listing as above, but with the addition of:

13. "Velvetine" – 3:39
14. "Electric Cowboy" – 5:09

Enhanced CD 440 063 685-2 (US only) This contained the same tracks as the standard release, but the enhanced section consisted of the following:

1. "Grace" (video) – 2:37
2. "Seen the Light" (video) – 2:45

3-CD DELUXE REMASTER [2023] BMGCAT797TCD

CD 2: Extras Terrestrial

1. Dark Star
2. Za (Helioscentric Demo)
3. Rush Hour Soul (Helioscentric Demo)
4. Everytime (B-side)
5. Seen the Light (Helioscentric Demo)
6. I Told The Truth (B-side)
7. The Loner (B-side)
8. Brecon Beacons (Helioscentric Demo)
9. Can't Get Up (Helioscentric Demo)
10. Evening Of The Day (Helioscentric Demo)
11. Funniest Thing (Helioscentric Demo)
12. Stinkfinger (unreleased instrumental)
13. Velvetine (B-side)
14. Electric Cowboy (B-side)
15. Tishing In Windows (Kicking Down Doors) (B-side)
16. That Old Song (B-side)
17. La Song (Helioscentric Demo)
18. Prophet 15 (Helioscentric Demo)
19. Tronic (unreleased instrumental)
20. Life On Other Planets (unreleased)

CD 3: Live Forms

1. Za Live at Elysée Montmartre
2. Rush Hour Soul Live at Elysée Montmartre
3. Seen The Light Live at Elysée Montmartre
4. Brecon Beacons Live at Elysée Montmartre
5. Can’t Get Up Live at Heineken Music Hall
6. Evening Of The Day Live at Wembley Arena
7. Never Done Nothing Like That Before Live at Elysée Montmartre
8. Funniest Thing Live at Wembley Arena
9. Grace Live at Wembley Arena
10. La Song Live at Wembley Arena
11. Prophet 15 Live At V2002
12. The Loner Live at Elysée Montmartre
13. Run Live at Elysée Montmartre
14. Rush Hour Soul Live Acoustic NYC
15. Seen The Light Live Acoustic XFM
16. Evening Of The Day Live Acoustic BBC Pebble Mill
17. Can’t Get Up Live Acoustic XFM

Note: CD2 + CD3 track details obtained from superdeluxeedition.com article. Link= https://superdeluxeedition.com/news/supergrass-life-on-other-planets-reissue/ More details: CD packaging folds out to 4 panels, housing the 24-page booklet, and the 3 CDs.

== Personnel ==
Personnel adapted from Life on Other Planets CD booklet.

Supergrass

- Gaz Coombes
- Mick Quinn
- Rob Coombes
- Danny Goffey

Technical personnel

- Tony Hoffer – production; mixing (2, 6, 7, 11, 12)
- Dave Sardy – mixing (2–5, 8–10)
- Supergrass – mixing (1)
- James Fry – photography

== Charts ==
Chart performance for Life on Other Planets
Chart (2002)	Peak position
Australian Albums (ARIA)	22
French Albums (SNEP)	44
German Albums (Offizielle Top 100)	63
Irish Albums (IRMA)	14
Norwegian Albums (VG-lista)	13
UK Albums (OCC)	9
US Heatseekers Albums (Billboard)	10
