= Compassion (The Hoosiers album) =

Studio album by the Hoosiers
- Released: 15 May 2026
- Recorded: August 2024
- Studio: Angelic; Crab Shack; Air
- Genre: Pop rock; indie pop; indie rock; alternative rock
- Length: 34:06
- Label: Crab Race
- Producer: Alan Sharland; Irwin Sparkes; Sam Miller

The Hoosiers chronology
Confidence (2023)	Compassion (2026)

Singles from Compassion
- 1. "Sleeping With The Light On" Released: 30 October 2025; 2. "Man From The Magazine" Released: 3 December 2025; 3. "Lonely Together" Released: 29 January 2026; 4. "Automatic Glow" Released: 3 March 2026; 5. "So High" Released: 8 April 2026; 6. "Jigsaw Heart" Released: 15 May 2026

Compassion is the sixth album by British indie pop band the Hoosiers. Following 2023's Confidence, it was released on 15 May 2026 by Crab Race.

== Background and promotion ==
Throughout 2023, whilst promoting Confidence, it was reported that the duo had begun working on a sixth album. In March 2025, drummer Alan Sharland confirmed this work was ongoing, with guitarist Irwin Sparkes confirming the release would be called Compassion in a July 2025 interview.

On October 30, 2025, The Hoosiers released the single 'Sleeping With The Light On,' which the pair later revealed "was written around 2009." This was followed on December 3, 2025 by 'Man From The Magazine,' 'Lonely Together' on January 29, 2026, 'Automatic Glow' on March 3, 2026, 'So High' on April 8, 2026 and 'Jigsaw Heart' on May 15, 2026. All six of these singles have had accompanying music videos, based on artwork by Roman Klonek and featuring animation by MediaNerd Ltd.

Alongside the release of 'Lonely Together,' the duo announced that Compassion would be released May 15, 2026. In promotion, the pair embarked on a 13-stop acoustic record shop tour in May 2026 and will perform the 10-date Compassion Tour in October 2026.

To promote the release, Sharland and Sparkes have appeared on the What's The Trick? podcast, BBC Radio 2, 5 News, Talksport, Jeremy Vine and BBC Radio Manchester.

In May 2026, The Hoosiers released a behind-the-scenes documentary titled The Making of Compassion which charted the recording of the album. Directed by Joe Aky, the film revealed that Compassion was recorded over the span of a week during August 2024.

== Critical reception ==
Professional ratings
Review scores
Source	Rating
Cult Following	3/5 stars
Maximum Volume Music	8.5/10

Initial reception to Compassion was mostly positive, with Maximum Volume Music scoring it 8.5/10 and suggesting the album is "full of warmth, wit and love and musically is bursting with perfect pop songs and earworms." Muso Muso echoed this sentiment, suggesting that "Compassion is The Hoosiers at their most open‑hearted and self‑assured" and that the record offers "warmth, humour, and a reminder that we’re all just trying our best."

RGM was similarly impressed, writing that "all 12 tracks have their own charm, yet work perfectly together for such an album of feel-good tunes" and that Compassion "is a safe haven to try and forget about everything else, and just enjoy life as it is." The Sound Cafe too praised the release, calling it "refreshingly human" and "vibrant, heartfelt, funny, thoughtful, and gloriously melodic."

Cult Following gave a more mixed review, however, praising Sparkes' vocals and suggesting the duo are "capturing that sugary sweet pop sentimentality" but that this was "a tad repetitive" and that The Hoosiers were "followers of a trend rather than makers of one." The publication scored the album 3 out of 5 stars.

== Track listing ==
Compassion track listing
No.	Title	Writer(s)	Length
1.	"Multiply"	Alan Sharland, Irwin Sparkes	3:11
2.	"Automatic Glow"	Sharland, Sparkes	3:13
3.	"So High"	Martin Dukelow, James Kallegher, Callie Noakes, Sharland, Sparkes, Silvano Stuurman	3:07
4.	"Sleeping with the Light On"	Sharland, Martin Skarendahl, Sparkes, Sam Swallow	4:02
5.	"Compassion"	Sharland, Sparkes	1:53
6.	"Don't Hang Your Head"	Sharland, Sparkes	2:44
7.	"Lonely Together"	Sharland, Sparkes	2:26
8.	"Jigsaw Heart"	Sharland, Sparkes	3:09
9.	"Everybody Is a Little More Broken Than They Pretend to Be"	Sharland, Sparkes	3:53
10.	"Man From The Magazine"	James Hayto, James Jackman, Sharland, Sparkes	2:19
11.	"Permission to Rest"	Sharland, Sparkes	3:20
12.	"The Final Piece of the Puzzle"	Sharland, Sparkes	00:49
Total length:			34:06

== Personnel ==
Credits adapted from the liner notes of Compassion.

The Hoosiers

- Alan Sharland – Production, drums, percussion, synths
- Irwin Sparkes – Production, guitars, synths, vocals

Additional personnel

- Leighton Allen - Bass
- Paul Frith - Keyboards, synths, piano
- Sam Miller - Production, percussion, synths, engineering, mixing
- Chris Vince - Keys
- Kings Place Choir - Choir
- Naomi Hammerton - Choral arrangement
- Olly Gandy - Engineering
- Luke Gibbs - Engineering
- Phil Kinrade - Mastering
- Adam Daly - Management
- Roman Klonek - Artwork
- Will Hutchinson - Design

== Charts ==
Chart performance for Compassion
Chart (2026)	Peak position
UK Albums Sales (OCC)	10
UK Independent Albums (OCC)	3
