= The Hoosiers =

English band

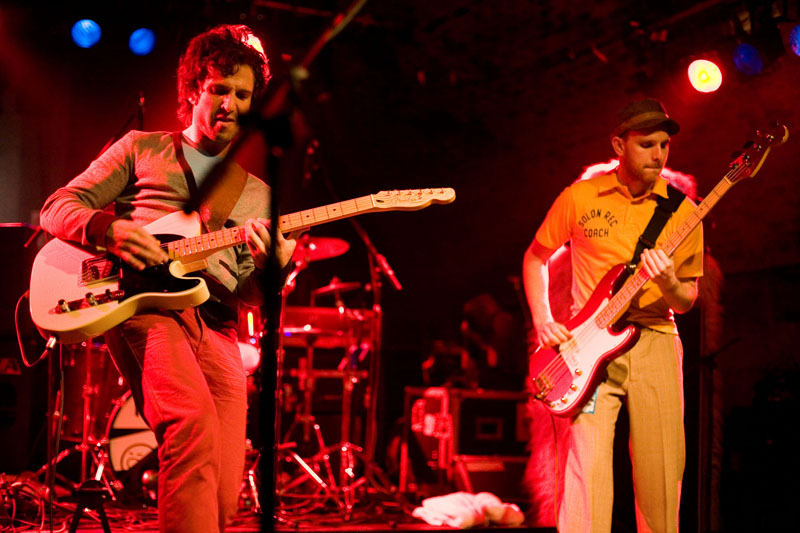
- Irwin Sparkes (left) and Martin Skarendahl (right) in 2007

Background information
- Origin: Indianapolis, Indiana, U.S.
- Genres: Pop rock; indie pop
- Years active: 2003–present
- Labels: RCA, Sony Music (2007-2011); Angelic Union, ABSOLUTE (2011-2013); Crab Race (2013-present)
- Members: Irwin Sparkes; Alan Sharland
- Past members: Tony Byrne; Tom Easey; Martin Skarendahl; Sam Swallow; Toby Smith
- Website: www.thehoosiers.com

The Hoosiers are an English pop rock band who were originally formed in Indianapolis, Indiana, United States. The band consists of members Irwin Sparkes (lead vocals, lead guitar) and Alan Sharland (drums, percussion, vocals).

Their first single "Worried About Ray" reached number 5 on the UK Singles Chart in July 2007, whilst their debut album, The Trick to Life, reached number 1 on the UK Albums Chart in October 2007. In August 2010, the band released their second top 20 single, "Choices", and their second top 10 album, The Illusion of Safety.

== History ==
=== 2003–2007: Origins ===
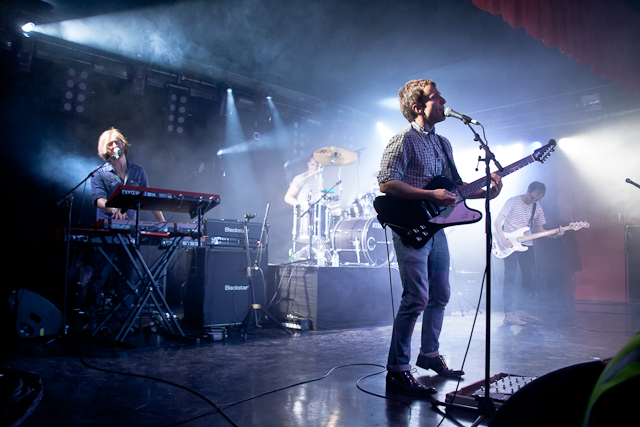
The Hoosiers performing at Live Fest in July 2011

When the band was formed in Indianapolis in 2003, Alan "Alphonso" Raymond Sharland (drummer) and Irwin Nathaniel Sparkes (lead singer and guitarist) spent some time in the United States, encouraged by their chemistry teacher Grant Serpell, (who was part of the band Sailor during their fame in the 1970s), in an attempt to broaden their horizons. The pair won themselves a football scholarship at the University of Indianapolis, despite a reputed claim to be "allergic to running" (a claim which is backed up by lead singer Sparkes' asthma).

Their time spent in Indiana inspired the band's name, as a citizen of Indiana is colloquially called a Hoosier. Having gathered enough material to compile an album, Sharland and Sparkes returned to London, where they met Swiss keyboard player and sound engineer Duri Darms and Martin Skarendahl, a Swedish ex-fireman who was then working with Darms as a recording studio engineer and studying at The London Music School. The original group included two band members (Tony Byrne and Tom Easey) who had left by this point, leaving Sparkes and Sharland to replace them with Skarendahl.

=== 2007–2011: The Trick to Life and The Illusion of Safety ===
This newly revamped trio of Sparkes, Skarendahl, and Sharland subsequently signed to RCA and released their first album The Trick to Life on 22 October 2007. The band have spoken of their desire to write songs that are about more than just "boy and girl... finding love on a Friday night on the lash with your mates". In February 2008, they were named as Worst Band at the annual NME awards. They were produced by ex-member of Jamiroquai, Toby Smith, until his death in 2017, and managed by Steve Morton.

The band's second single, "Goodbye Mr A", appeared in the football video game FIFA 08, and the game can also be seen in the "Goodbye Mr A" music video. Following the release of "Worst Case Scenario", the next release from The Trick to Life was "Cops and Robbers".

For their second album, The Illusion of Safety, several changes were made, including a more synthesised sound and the drummer 'Alphonso' returning to his given name Alan. The Illusion of Safety gave the first single "Choices" and includes the song "Unlikely Hero", for which a video was filmed in a quarry in Derbyshire. The latter was due to be a single until it was announced that this was not the case on 14 October 2010.

=== 2011–2013: Bumpy Ride ===
It was announced on 1 April 2011, that the band had departed from their record labels RCA and Sony Music after a dispute over the promotion of their latest album The Illusion of Safety. Sparkes told the Daily Record, "I don't think many people knew that the second album had been released, so we're having to reissue it to bring it to people's awareness."

The band announced that they were repackaging and re-releasing the album with a new title, Bumpy Ride, on 11 April 2011. The rerelease comes with 4 new album tracks, and a deluxe version comes with a DVD of live performances.

On 24 May 2013, they appeared at Bradford University's Party on the Amp to perform a few songs, including "Goodbye Mr A".

On 25 May 2013, they appeared at Roehampton University's summerball to perform a few songs. On 18 July 2013, they performed at Bishop Grosseteste University, Lincoln, England. On 19 July 2013, they appeared at Bugjam, Santa Pod Raceway, as one of the headline acts.

It was announced by the band on Twitter that long-term keyboard player Sam Swallow would be joining the band as a full member in 2013.

=== 2013–2022: The News From Nowhere and The Secret Service ===
On 17 September 2013, the Hoosiers sent an email out to their fans announcing the planned release of their new album The News from Nowhere. The news was accompanied by the release of the first single from this album, "Somewhere in the Distance", a few weeks later. The band asked fans to pre-order the album. They also gave fans the chance to appear in their "Somewhere in the Distance" video and visit the recording studio.

We're not a big record label with lots of money, though, so need to pay for the recording, manufacturing, adverts, videos, touring, promotion – all the stuff a label usually does – ourselves.

The album was released on 14 April 2014 under the record label 'Crab Race' and was made available on iTunes, Google Play, as well as streaming services such as Spotify. Shortly after the release of the album the band embarked on a UK-wide tour in the summer of 2014. This tour would be their last with founding bassist Martin Skarendahl who left the band in July 2015, in what was described by the remaining members as "one of the most amicable decisions in music history".

After the departure of Skarendahl, the band began work on their fourth studio album titled The Secret Service. Like The News from Nowhere, the band asked fans to pre-order the album and offered a similar incentive system to help with the production of new music. On 9 October 2015, the album was released, preceded by the EPs The Wheels Fell Off and Up to No Good. The band followed up the album with two live albums; one with recordings taken from a performance at the London Islington Academy from the 'Tour from Nowhere' in May 2014, and the other was titled Acoustic Songs in a Church which included 12 tracks from across the band's four albums to date, each song recorded in one take on a single day in February 2014. As both albums were recorded in 2014 before Martin's departure, they are the last albums to feature the full line-up of the Hoosiers to date.

After finishing their tour in 2016, it was announced that Swallow would be leaving the band.

=== 2023–Present: Confidence and Compassion ===
On 15 September 2023 they released their fifth studio album Confidence.

During the summer of 2024 The Hoosiers supported bands McFly and Madness at select UK dates.

On 15 May 2026, the duo released their sixth album Compassion.

== Side Projects ==
=== Felix and The Scootermen ===
In May 2019, Sparkes and Sharland announced they would be appearing at that year's Edinburgh Fringe as 'Felix and The Scootermen,' a comedy duo featuring Sharland as 'Lee Delamere' and Sparkes as 'Felix Scoot.' Titled Self-Help Yourself Famous, the duo billed the show "as a self-help seminar" that "takes a few left turns and ends up looking at what motivates these two friends to stay together, doing what they do;" the show ran between 31 July and 26 August at the Underbelly, Bristo Square.

Reviews of the production were mostly negative, with Tom Inniss of Voice Magazine scoring the show 2 of 5 stars, claiming that despite "how strong the core components were... none of it gelled." Radio Ha-Ha! was similarly unimpressed, suggesting the show was "chaotic and muddled" and a "difficult hour to watch," scoring it 1.5 stars. James McColl of The Skinny also gave a low 2-star rating, claiming that whilst Sparkes and Sharland "are both good performers... Felix and The Scootermen feels like a self-indulgent vanity project." Geoff Evans of One4Review gave a more mixed review, however, noting that whilst "the comedy is not the strongest," the show was still "a pleasant way to spend an hour;" Evans scored the production 3 stars.

=== White Tail Falls ===
On 18 October 2019 lead singer Irwin Sparkes released the single "Give It Up, Son" under the name 'White Tail Falls,' with an accompanying music video premiering on 15 November. Following the release of a second single, "Disintegrate" on 14 January 2020, an album, titled Age Of Entitlement, was formally announced.

The four-track Fake News EP followed on 6 March, with the album proper released on 29 May; the release was received positively by critics.

Sparkes later revealed in interviews that the idea for creating a solo album "started forming around 2015", whilst White Tail Falls itself came about during "a ‘wobble crisis’ when The Hoosiers took a year off," with Sparkes inspired to create new music after "committing to a couple of years of therapy." He has also referred to the process of releasing the album as "a baptism of fire" that took "2 years of writing and recording" to create, predominantly by himself.

White Tail Falls' latest release is a second EP, Entitlement of Age, released on 30 May 2022.

=== "Route 66" ===
In 2021 The Hoosiers teamed up with former Britain's Got Talent contestants and YouTubers Woody & Kleiny, to record a tie-in record to the Euro 2020 Football Championship called "Route 66". Based on an old song called "PC Wilson", the football song is a charity record with proceeds from the single going to the charity CALM (Campaign Against Living Miserably), while the video features appearances from Naughty Boy, The Wealdstone Raider and indie band Two Weeks in Nashville. "Route 66" charted on the Official Singles Sales Chart Top 100 at number one on the 18 June 2021, beating Will Mellor's charity cover of "Vindaloo" (recorded as Together For England with celebrities like Keith Lemon, Danny Dyer and Paddy McGuinness) which charted at number three, however neither record made the streaming chart or the Official UK Top 40.

== Members ==
- Alan Sharland – drums (2003–)
- Irwin Sparkes – lead vocals, guitars (2003–)

Former members

- Tony Byrne – bass guitar (2003–2007)
- Tom Easey – guitars (2003–2007)
- Martin Skarendahl – bass guitar, backing vocals (2007–2015)
- Sam Swallow – keyboards, backing vocals (2013–2016)

== Discography ==
=== Studio albums ===
- The Trick to Life (2007)
- The Illusion of Safety (2010) (reissued in 2011 as Bumpy Ride)
- The News from Nowhere (2014)
- The Secret Service (2015)
- Confidence (2023)
- Compassion (2026)
