= The Trick to Life =

Studio album by the Hoosiers
- Released: 22 October 2007
- Recorded: 2002–2003
- Genres: Pop rock; indie pop; post-punk revival
- Length: 39:26
- Label: RCA
- Producer: Toby Smith

The Hoosiers chronology
The Trick to Life (2007)	The Illusion of Safety (2010)

Singles from The Trick to Life
- 1. "Worried About Ray" Released: 25 June 2007; 2. "Goodbye Mr A" Released: 8 October 2007; 3. "Worst Case Scenario" Released: 7 January 2008; 4. "Cops and Robbers" Released: 21 April 2008

Professional ratings
Review scores
Source	Rating
AllMusic	3/5 stars
Digital Spy	2/5 stars
Drowned in Sound	3/10 stars
The Guardian	3/5 stars
stv.tv	4/5 stars

The Trick to Life is the debut studio album by English indie pop band the Hoosiers. It was released in the United Kingdom on 22 October 2007 by RCA Records. Four singles were released from the album.

== Album cover ==
The album was released with multiple different colours to the front cover. The 2008 Japanese release and the 2017 10th Anniversary re-release has a multi-coloured cover.

== Commercial performance ==
The album reached No. 1 on the UK Charts.

The album charted at No. 98 in the UK end of year album chart, selling around 95,900 copies in 2007.

The album has sold 658,056 copies in the UK as of April 2014.

== Track listing ==
All tracks were written by The Hoosiers and produced by Toby Smith (except "Worried About Ray", which is also credited to Alan Gordon and Garry Bonner)

No.	Title	Length
1.	"Worried About Ray"	2:46
2.	"Worst Case Scenario"	2:35
3.	"Run Rabbit Run"	3:13
4.	"Goodbye Mr A"	4:27
5.	"A Sadness Runs Through Him"	3:13
6.	"Clinging on for Life"	2:39
7.	"Cops and Robbers"	4:00
8.	"Everything Goes Dark"	3:37
9.	"Killer"	3:49
10.	"The Trick to Life"	2:49
11.	"Money to Be Made"	2:01
12.	"The Feeling You Get When" (hidden track)	4:17
Total length:		39:26

iTunes bonus tracks
No.	Title	Length
13.	"Rules"	4:29
14.	"Worried About Ray" (Stripped Live 06-03-07)	2:45
Total length:		46:40

Japanese Edition, 10th Anniversary Edition and 15th Anniversary Edition bonus tracks
No.	Title	Length
13.	"Ruby Blue"	2:38
14.	"Rules"	4:29
Total length:		46:33

The Trick to Life (10th Anniversary Edition) bonus disc
No.	Title	Length
15.	"Worried About Ray" (Acoustic version)	2:45
16.	"Cops and Robbers" (Jake Ridley remix)	5:54
17.	"Cops and Robbers" (Ashanti Boyz remix)	5:41
18.	"Cops and Robbers" (Melox Marvels remix)	4:42
19.	"Worried About Ray" (Stripped/Live)	2:47
20.	"We Didn't Start the Fire" (Stripped/Live)	2:20
21.	"A Sadness Runs Through Him" (Stripped/Live)	3:11
22.	"Clinging on For Life" (Stripped/Live)	2:52
23.	"Worried About Ray" (Instrumental)	2:48
24.	"Worst Case Scenario" (Instrumental)	2:38
25.	"Run Rabbit Run" (Instrumental)	3:15
26.	"Goodbye Mr A" (Instrumental)	4:26
27.	"A Sadness Runs Through Him" (Instrumental)	3:13
28.	"Cops and Robbers" (Instrumental)	4:00
29.	"Everything Goes Dark" (Instrumental)	3:37
30.	"Killer" (Instrumental)	4:06
31.	"The Trick to Life" (Instrumental)	2:47
32.	"Money to Be Made" (Instrumental)	2:02
33.	"The Feeling You Get When" (Instrumental)	4:17
34.	"Rules" (Instrumental)	4:32
Total length:		78:52

15th Anniversary Edition bonus tracks
No.	Title	Length
15.	"Song for the Uncertain" (Demo)	4:02
16.	"Goodbye Mr A" (Demo)	3:21
17.	"Cops and Robbers" (Demo)	3:05
18.	"Swear It on Your Life"	3:11
19.	"Save Me from Myself"	3:08
20.	"Holding On for July" (Demo)	3:20
Total length:		66:40

== Charts ==
=== Weekly charts ===
Chart (2007)	Peak position
Belgian Albums (Ultratop Wallonia)	76
European Top 100 Albums (Billboard)	8
French Albums (SNEP)	82
German Albums (Offizielle Top 100)	91
Irish Albums (IRMA)	43
Japanese Albums (Oricon)	64
Scottish Albums (Official Charts)	1
Swiss Albums (Schweizer Hitparade)	65
UK Albums (Official Charts)	1

=== Year-end charts ===
Chart (2007)	Position
UK Albums (OCC)	30

== Certifications ==
Region	Certification	Certified units/sales
United Kingdom (BPI)	2× Platinum	600,000^{^}
^{^} Shipments figures based on certification alone.
