= Worried About Ray =

2007 single by the Hoosiers

Single by the Hoosiers

from the album The Trick to Life
- B-side: "We Didn't Start the Fire"
- Released: 25 June 2007
- Studio: Angelic (Buckinghamshire, UK)
- Length: 2:46
- Label: RCA
- Songwriters: Garry Bonner; Alan Gordon; Alan Sharland; Martin Skarendahl; Irwin Sparkes
- Producer: Toby Smith

The Hoosiers singles chronology
"Worried About Ray" (2007)	"Goodbye Mr A" (2007)

"Worried About Ray" is a song by English pop rock band the Hoosiers. The song utilises parts of the Turtles' 1967 hit "Happy Together", so its writers, Alan Gordon and Garry Bonner, are credited as co-writers. It was released as the lead single from the band's first album, The Trick to Life, and served as their debut single. It peaked at No. 5 on the UK Singles Chart and also charted in Belgium, Germany, Ireland, and Switzerland.

== Commercial performance ==
On downloads alone, "Worried About Ray" debuted at No. 16 on the UK Singles Chart on 24 June 2007. It climbed to No. 6 the following week with CD sales included, then rose one place to its peak position of No. 5 the following week.

== Music video ==
In the music video, inspired by the American special effects pioneer Ray Harryhausen, the band is with "Ray", a monster movie director and creator. When creating another monster, that monster talks with him and tries to go after the Hoosiers, but Irwin Sparkes defeats the monster.

== Track listing ==
European CD single
No.	Title	Writer(s)	Producer(s)	Length
1.	"Worried About Ray"	Garry Bonner; Alan Gordon; Alan Sharland; Martin Skarendahl; Irwin Sparkes	Toby Smith	2:42
2.	"We Didn't Start the Fire" (Billy Joel cover)	Billy Joel	Ben Walker; Simon Ward II	2:50

== Credits and personnel ==
Credits are adapted from the European CD single liner notes.

Studio

- Recorded at Angelic Studios (Buckinghamshire, UK)

The Hoosiers

- Irwin Sparkes – vocals, guitar, writer
- Alan Sharland – drums, writer
- Martin Skarendahl – bass, writer

Other personnel

- Toby Smith – keys, producer, engineering, recording
- Duri Darms – keys
- Andy Saunders – engineering, recording
- Sam Miller – mixing

== Charts ==
=== Weekly charts ===
Chart (2007–2008)	Peak position
Belgium (Ultratip Bubbling Under Flanders)	18
Belgium (Ultratip Bubbling Under Wallonia)	14
Europe (Eurochart Hot 100)	18
Germany (GfK)	94
Ireland (IRMA)	38
Scottish Singles Sales (Official Charts)	17
Switzerland (Schweizer Hitparade)	85
UK Singles (Official Charts)	5

=== Year-end charts ===
Chart (2007)	Position
UK Singles (OCC)	31

== Certifications ==
Region	Certification	Certified units/sales
United Kingdom (BPI)	Gold	400,000^{‡}
^{‡} Sales+streaming figures based on certification alone.
