= Goodbye Mr A =

2007 single by the Hoosiers

Single by the Hoosiers

from the album The Trick to Life
- Released: 8 October 2007
- Length: 4:27
- Label: RCA
- Songwriters: Irwin Sparkes; Alan Sharland; Martin Skarendahl
- Producer: Toby Smith

The Hoosiers singles chronology
"Worried About Ray" (2007)	"Goodbye Mr A" (2007)	"Worst Case Scenario" (2008)

"Goodbye Mr A" is the second single by the English pop rock band the Hoosiers, from their debut album, The Trick to Life (2007). The song has been noted for its similarities to Electric Light Orchestra's single "Mr. Blue Sky". Released on 8 October 2007, the song gave the band their second UK top-five single, entering the UK Singles Chart at No. 5 on 14 October 2007 and climbing to its peak of No. 4 the following week.

== Music video ==
The music video to "Goodbye Mr A" is reminiscent of superhero comics and popular culture, such as the 1960s Batman television series. In the video, the Hoosiers kidnap Mr A, a comic-book character and the world's greatest superhero. They then take his place fighting crime. Despite being fired into space at the end, Mr A. survives and opens his eyes; this is a reference to the film Fantastic Four: Rise of the Silver Surfer.

== Track listing ==
UK CD single
No.	Title	Writer(s)	Producer(s)	Length
1.	"Goodbye Mr A" (radio edit)	The Hoosiers	Toby Smith	3:48
2.	"Worried About Ray" (live on Virgin Radio)	Alan Gordon, Garry Bonner, Irwin Sparkes, Alan Sharland, Martin Skarendahl	Smith	4:29

== Charts ==
=== Weekly charts ===
Chart (2007)	Peak position
Europe (Eurochart Hot 100)	15
Ireland (IRMA)	23
Scottish Singles Sales (Official Charts)	16
UK Singles (Official Charts)	4

=== Year-end charts ===
Chart (2007)	Position
UK Singles (OCC)	60

Chart (2008)	Position
UK Singles (OCC)	137

== Certifications ==
Region	Certification	Certified units/sales
United Kingdom (BPI)	Platinum	600,000^{‡}
^{‡} Sales+streaming figures based on certification alone.
