= Creation Records discography =

Recording catalog

This is a discography of Creation Records.

== Discography ==
=== Albums ===
Catalog number	Date released	Artist	Title	Notes
CRELP 001	1984-08	Various artists	Alive in the Living Room	live album
CRELP 002	1984-09	Various artists	Wild Summer, Wow! – A Creation Sampler	compilation; mini-album
CRELP 003	1984-12	Jasmine Minks	One Two Three Four Five Six Seven, All Good Preachers Go to Heaven	mini-album
CRELP 004	1985-02	Biff Bang Pow!	Pass the Paintbrush, Honey....	mini-album
CRELP 005	1985-09	Various artists	Different for Domeheads – A Creation Compilation	compilation
CRELP 006	1985-08	The Membranes	The Gift of Life	
CRELP 007	1986-06	The Jasmine Minks	The Jasmine Minks	
CRELP 008	1986-02	The Chills	Kaleidoscope World	compilation; mini-album (Note: released in New Zealand on Flying Nun)
CRELP 009	1986-06	Felt	Let the Snakes Crinkle Their Heads to Death	mini-album (Note: AKA The Seventeenth Century)
CRELP 010	1986	Various artists	Purveyors of Taste – A Creation Compilation	compilation
CRELP 011	1986-10	Felt	Forever Breathes the Lonely Word	
CRELP 012	1986-10	Nikki Sudden & the Jacobites	Texas	
CRELP 013	1986-10	The Jasmine Minks	Sunset	compilation
CRELP 014	1986	Bill Drummond	The Man	
CRELP 015	1987-03	Biff Bang Pow!	The Girl Who Runs the Beat Hotel	
CRELP 016	1987-04	Nikki Sudden & the Jacobites	Dead Man Tells No Tales	mini-album
CRELP 017	1987-06	Felt	Poem of the River	mini-album
CRELP 018	1987-06	The Revolving Paint Dream	Off to Heaven	mini-album
CRELP 019	1987-11	David Westlake	Westlake	mini-album
CRELP 020	1987-06	Biff Bang Pow!	Oblivion	
CRELP 021	1987-07	Momus	The Poison Boyfriend	
CRELP 022	1987-11	Nikki Sudden & Rowland S. Howard	Kiss You Kidnapped Charabanc	
CRELP 023	1987-09	Heidi Berry	Firefly	mini-album
CRELP 024	1987	Various artists	Doing God's Work – A Creation Compilation	compilation
CRELP 025	1988-01	The Jasmine Minks	Another Age	
CRELP 026	1988-02	Razorcuts	Storyteller	
CRELP 027	1988-02	The Jazz Butcher	Fishcoteque	
CRELP 028 CD	1988	Various artists	Creation: Flowers in the Sky 1984–1987	compilation
CRELP 029	1988-04	Biff Bang Pow!	Love Is Forever	
CRELP 030	1988-05	Felt	The Pictorial Jackson Review	
CRELP 031	1988-06	The Pastels	Suck on the Pastels	compilation
CRELP 032	1988	Various artists	Creation: Purple Compilation	compilation
CRELP 033	1988-06	The Weather Prophets	Judges, Juries and Horsemen	
CRELP 034	1988-05	The House of Love	The House of Love	
CRELP 035	1988-08	Felt	Train Above the City	
CRELP 036	1988-07	Momus	Tender Pervert	
CRELP 037	1988-08	Various artists	Doing It for the Kids	compilation
CRELP 038	1988-10	The Times	Beat Torture	
CRELP 039	1989-01	The Revolving Paint Dream	Mother Watch Me Burn	
CRELP 040	1988-11	My Bloody Valentine	Isn't Anything	
CRELP 041	1989-04	Nikki Sudden & the French Revolution	Groove	
CRELP 042	1989	Duncan Dhu	Duncan Dhu	compilation
CRELP 043	1989-04	The Sneetches	Sometimes That's All We Have	
CRELP 044	1989-02	The Jasmine Minks	Scratch the Surface	
CRELP 045	1989-02	Razorcuts	The World Keeps Turning	
CRELP 046	1989-06	Biff Bang Pow!	The Acid House Album	compilation
CRELP 047	1989-09	The Loft	Once Around the Fair: The Loft 1982–1985	compilation
CRELP 048	1989-05	Heidi Berry	Below the Waves	
CRELP 049	1989-07	The Jazz Butcher	Big Planet, Scarey Planet	
CRELP 050	1989-11	The Weather Prophets	Temperance Hotel	compilation
CRELP 051	1989	The Bounty Hunters	Threads: A Tear Stained Scar	
CRELP 052	1989-11	Momus	Don't Stop the Night	
CRELP 053	1989-10	The Times	E for Edward	
CRELP 054	1989-09-04	Primal Scream	Primal Scream	
CRELP 055	1989	Ed Ball	L'orange mechanik	
CRELP 056	1990-02	Love Corporation	Tones	
CRELP 057	1989	Church of Raism	Church of Raism	
CRELP 058	1990-01	Biff Bang Pow!	Songs for the Sad Eyed Girl	mini-album
CRELP 059	1990-03	Momus	Monsters of Love – Singles 1985–90	compilation
CRELP 060	1991-11	My Bloody Valentine	Loveless	
CRELP 061	1990	Tangerine	Tangerine	
CRELP 062	1990-06-25	The Jazz Butcher	Cult of the Basement	
CRELP 063	1990	Various artists	Do You Believe in Love? – A Creation Compilation	compilation
CRELP 064	1990	Simon Turner	Simon Turner	
CRELP 065	1990	Pete Astor	Submarine	
CRELP 666 [sic]	1990	Brides of Ashton	Themes from the Black Book	
CRELP 067	1990	Hypnotone	Hypnotone	
CRELP 068	1991	Love Corporation	Lovers	
CRELP 069	1990-04	Felt	Bubblegum Perfume	compilation
CRELP 070	1990-08	The Times	Et Dieu créa la femme	
CRELP 071	1991	Biff Bang Pow!	Me	
CRELP 072	1991	Fluke	The Techno Rose of Blighty	
CRELP 073	1991-07	The Times	Pink Ball, Brown Ball, Ed Ball	compilation
CRELP 074	1990-10-15	Ride	Nowhere	
CRELP 075	1990	Something Pretty Beautiful	Something Pretty Beautiful	mini-album
CRELP 076	1991-09-23	Primal Scream	Screamadelica	
CRECD 077	1991	The Sneetches	Lights Out! with the Sneetches	reissue (Note: originally released on Kaleidoscope Sound (1988))
CRELP 078	1991	The Jazz Butcher	Edwards's Closet	compilation
CRELP 079	1992-05	The Telescopes	The Telescopes	
CRELP 080	1991	Hypnotone	Ai	
CRELP 081	1991	Various artists	Keeping the Faith – A Creation Dance Compilation	compilation
CRELP 082	1990	Various artists	Pensioners on Ecstasy	compilation
CRELP 083	1990	Nikki Sudden	Back to the Coast	compilation
CRELP 084	1990	Slaughter Joe	Pied Piper of Feedback	compilation
CRELP 085	1991	The Weather Prophets	'87	live
CRELP 086	1991	Black Eg	Black Eg	
CRELP 087	1990	Pacific	Inference	
CRELP 088	1991	Various artists	A Palace in the Sun – A Creation Compilation	compilation
CRELP 089	1991	Sand	The Dynamic Curve	
CRELP 090	1991	Peter Astor	Zoo	
CRELP 091	1990-08	The Times	Pure	
CRECD 092	1991	Dave Kusworth & the Bounty Hunters	Wives, Weddings, and Roses	reissue (Note: originally released as KSLP 006 on Kaleidoscope Sound (1988))
CRELP 093	1991-09-30	Swervedriver	Raise	
CRELP 094	1991-09-02	Slowdive	Just for a Day	
CRELP 095	1991-04	Various artists	American Pensioners on Ecstasy	compilation
CRELP 096	1991-08-27	Teenage Fanclub	The King	
CRELP 097	1991-08-12	Momus	Hippopotamomus	
CRELP 098	1991	The Lilac Time	Astronauts	
CRELP 099	1991-11	Biff Bang Pow!	L'Amour, Demure, Stenhousemuir	compilation
CRELP 100	1991	Various artists	Creation Soup: Volumes One to Five	box set
CRELP 101	1991	Various artists	Creation Soup: Volume One	compilation
CRELP x101	1992-02	Slowdive	Blue Day	compilation
CRELP 102	1991	Various artists	Creation Soup: Volume Two	compilation
CRELP 103	1991	Various artists	Creation Soup: Volume Three	compilation
CRELP 104	1991	Various artists	Creation Soup: Volume Four	compilation
CRELP 105	1991	Various artists	Creation Soup: Volume Five	compilation
CRELP 106	1991-11-04	Teenage Fanclub	Bandwagonesque	
CRELP 107	N/A	N/A	N/A	unissued
CRELP 108	1991	Dave Kusworth	All the Heartbreak Stories	
CRELP 109	1991	Velvet Crush	In the Presence of Greatness	
CRELP 110	1991	The Jazz Butcher	Condition Blue	
CRELP 111	1991	Teenage Filmstars	Lift Off mit der Teenage Filmstars	(Note: AKA Star)
CRELP 112	1991	The Jasmine Minks	Soul Station	compilation
CRELP 113	1992	Momus	Voyager	
CRELP 114	1991	Various artists	Area Code 212	compilation
CRELP 115	1992	Various artists	Keeping the Faith Again – A Creation Dance Compilation	compilation
CRELP 116	1994	Love Corporation	Intelligentsia	
CRELP 117	1991	Various artists	Sorted, Snorted and Sported – A Creation Compilation	compilation
CRELP 118	1992	Silverfish	Organ Fan	
CRELP 119	1991	Razorcuts	Patterns on the Water – A Retrospective	compilation
CRELP 120	1992-03	The Boo Radleys	Everything's Alright Forever	
CRELP 121	1992	Sheer	Absolutely Sheer	
CRELP 122	1992	Pie Finger	A Dali Surprise	
CRELP 123	1992-04	The Times	The Times at the Astradome Lunaville	live album
CRELP 124	1992-03-09	Ride	Going Blank Again	
CRELP 125	1992-02	Biff Bang Pow!	Debasement Tapes	compilation
CRECD 126	1990-07	Ride	Smile	compilation; mini-album
CRECD 127	1992	Sand	Vol. Two/Five Grains	
CRELP 128	N/A	unissued	unissued	unissued
CRELP 129	1992-09-04	Sugar	Copper Blue	
CRELP 130	1994	Velvet Crush	Teenage Symphonies to God	
CRECD 131	1992	Poster Children	Daisychain Reaction	reissue (Note: originally released on Twin/Tone (1991))
CRELP 132	N/A	unissued	unissued	unissued
CRELP 133	1993	BMX Bandits	Life Goes On	
CRELP 134	1992	Superstar	Greatest Hits Vol. One	mini-album
CRECD 135	1995	Various artists	Coming Down – A Creation Compilation	compilation
CRECD 136	1995	Scuba	Underwater Symphony	
CRELP 137	1993-04	The Times	Alternative Commercial Crossover	
CRELP 138	1993-03	Adorable	Against Perfection	
CRELP 139	1993-06	Slowdive	Souvlaki	
CRELP 140	1992	Various artists	All the President's Men – A Creation Compilation	compilation
CRELP 141	1993	Teenage Filmstars	Rocket Charms	
CRELP 142	1992-09-15	Medicine	Shot Forth Self Living	
CRELP 143	1993-08-12	Swervedriver	Mezcal Head	
CRELP 144	1993-10-04	Teenage Fanclub	Thirteen	
CRELP 145	1994	Medalark Eleven	Shaped Out, Shipped Out	
CRELP 146	1994-03-28	Primal Scream	Give Out but Don't Give Up	
CRELP 147	1994-06-20	Ride	Carnival of Light	
CRECD 148	1993	The Jazz Butcher	Western Family: Live in America and Canada	live album
CRELP 149	1993-08-16	The Boo Radleys	Giant Steps	
CRECD 150	1993-04	Felt	Absolute Classic Masterpieces Volume II	compilation; 2×CD
CRELP 151	1993-10	Momus	Timelord	
CRELP 152	N/A	unissued	unissued	unissued
CRELP 153	1993-04-06	Sugar	Beaster	mini-album
CRECD 154	1997	Dexys Midnight Runners	Don't Stand Me Down	reissue (Note: originally released on Mercury (1985))
CRELP 155	1993-02-26	Poster Children	Tool of the Man	(Note: released in US through Sire/Reprise)
CRELP 156	1993	The Jazz Butcher Conspiracy	Waiting for the Love Bus	
CRELP 157	1995-07-15	Swervedriver	Ejector Seat Reservation	
CRELP 158	1994	James Young	Songs They Never Play on the Radio	
CRELP 159	1994	A Certain Ratio	Looking for a Certain Ratio...	remix album
CRELP 160	1994	Idha	Melody Inn	
CRELP 161	1993	Conspiracy of Noise	Chicks with Dicks and Splatter Flicks	
CRELP 162	1993-07	Dreadzone	360°	
CRELP 163	1993	Hollyfaith	Purrrr	
CRELP 164	1994	18 Wheeler	Twin Action	
CRELP 165	1994-09-16	Adorable	Fake	
CRELP 166	1995	Ruby	Salt Peter	
CRELP 166R	1995	Ruby	Salt Peter Remixed: Revenge, the Sweetest Fruit	
CRELP 167	N/A	Sand	Guitarchestra	unissued
CRELP 168	1995-02-06	Slowdive	Pygmalion	
CRELP 169	1994-08-29	Oasis	Definitely Maybe	
CRELP 170	1994-10-11	The Cramps	Flamejob	
CRECD 171	1996	Various artists	Noise Annoys – A Creation Compilation	compilation
CRELP 172	1994-09-06	Sugar	File Under: Easy Listening	
CRELP 173	1995-05-29	Teenage Fanclub	Grand Prix	
CRELP 174	1995	BMX Bandits	Gettin' Dirty	
CRELP 175	N/A	unissued	unissued	unissued
CRELP 176	1996	The Creation	Power Surge	
CRECD 177	1997	Teenage Filmstars	Buy Our Record Support Our Sickness	
CRELP 178	1997-07-07	Primal Scream	Vanishing Point	
CRELP 179	1995-03	The Boo Radleys	Wake Up!	
CRECD 180	1996-03-20	Ride	Tarantula	
CRELP 181	1995	18 Wheeler	Formanka	
CRELP 182	1995	The Jazz Butcher Conspiracy	Illuminate	
CRELP 183	1995	Ed Ball	Welcome to the World of Ed Ball	compilation; 2×LP
CRELP 184	1997	Idha	Troublemaker	
CRELP 185	1996-09-23	Heavy Stereo	Déjà Voodoo	
CRELP 186	N/A	unissued	unissued	unissued
CRELP 187	N/A	unissued	unissued	unissued
CRELP 188	1996-04-30	Bob Mould	Bob Mould	
CRELP 189	1995-10-02	Oasis	(What's the Story) Morning Glory?	2×LP
CRELP 190	1996-05-20	Super Furry Animals	Fuzzy Logic	
CRELP 191	1996	Glen Matlock	Who Does He Think He Is When He's at Home?	
CRELP 192	1997	18 Wheeler	Year Zero	
CRELP 193	1997-03-10	The Diggers	Mount Everest	
CRELP 194	1996-09	The Boo Radleys	C'mon Kids	2×LP
CRELP 195	1995	Ed Ball	If a Man Ever Loved a Woman	
CRELP 196	1997-07-29	Teenage Fanclub	Songs from Northern Britain	
CRECD 197	1996	Various artists	Gobshite and Godsend – A Creation Compilation	compilation
CRELP 198	N/A	unissued	unissued	unissued
CRELP 199	1997	Love Corporation	Dance Stance	
CRELP 200	1997	Edward Ball	Catholic Guilt	
CRELP 201	1996	Eggman	First Fruits	
CRECD 202	1996	BMX Bandits	Theme Park	
CRECD 203	1996	Offworld	Another Planet	
CRECD 204	1997	Sumosonic	This Is Sumo	
CRELP 205	N/A	Slaughter Joe	unissued	unissued
CRELP 206	1997-09-15	Hurricane #1	Hurricane #1	
CRECD 207	1997	Teenage Filmstars	Bring Back the Cartel	(Note: The Cartel)
CRELP 208	1997-05-12	3 Colours Red	Pure	
CRELP 209	N/A	Grantby	unissued	unissued
CRECD 210	1997-08-11	Nick Heyward	The Apple Bed	
CRELP 211	1998	Ultra Living	Monochromatic Adventure	
CRELP 212	1999	Trashmonk	Mona Lisa Overdrive	
CRELP 213	N/A	Ruby	unissued	unissued
CRELP 214	1997-08-25	Super Furry Animals	Radiator	
CRELP 215	1998-08-25	Bob Mould	The Last Dog and Pony Show	
CRECD 216	1999-09-21	Kevin Rowland	My Beauty	
CRECD 217	1999	Ivor Cutler	A Wet Handle	spoken word
CRELP 218	1997	Arnold	The Barn Tapes	
CRELP 219	1997-08-21	Oasis	Be Here Now	2×LP
CRELP 220	N/A	unissued	unissued	unissued
CRECD 221	1998-04-06	Bernard Butler	People Move On	
CRECD 222	1999-12	The Times	Pirate Playlist 66	
CRELP 223	N/A	Dexys Midnight Runners	unissued	unissued
CRELP 224	1997-10-27	Primal Scream	Echo Dek	remix album
CRELP 225	1998-05-04	Saint Etienne	Good Humor	
CRELP 226	N/A	unissued	unissued	unissued
CRELP 227	1999-02-08	3 Colours Red	Revolt	
CRELP 228	1998-10	The Boo Radleys	Kingsize	
CRELP 229	1998	Super Furry Animals	Out Spaced	compilation
CRELP 230	N/A	Ed Ball	unissued	unissued
CRELP231	1998	Arnold	Hillside	
CRELP 232	1998-06-02	The Jesus and Mary Chain	Munki	
CRECD 233	1998	The Completion	Electronic Music for the Cinema	
CRELP 234	N/A	unissued	unissued	unissued
CRELP 235	N/A	Technique	Pop Philosophy	unissued (Note: issued on Poptones (2001))
CRECD 236	1998	Ivor Cutler	A Flat Man	spoken word
CRELP 237	1999-04-21	Hurricane #1	Only the Strongest Will Survive	
CRELP 238	N/A	Teenage Fanclub	unissued	unissued
CRELP 239	2000-01-31	Primal Scream	XTRMNTR	
CRECD 240	1998	Various artists	Rock the Dock	(Note: "A compilation to raise money for the striking Liverpool Dockers and their families")
CRELP 241	1998-11-02	Oasis	The Masterplan	compilation
CRELP 242	1999-06-14	Super Furry Animals	Guerrilla	
CRELP 243	N/A	Rackit	unissued	unissued
CRELP 244	1999	Mishka	Mishka	
CRELP 245	1999	One Lady Owner	There's Only We	
CRELP 246	N/A	Felt	unissued	compilation
CRELP 247	N/A	unissued	unissued	unissued
CRELP 248	1999-10-25	Bernard Butler	Friends and Lovers	
CRECD 249	1999	Various artists	Whatever – Soundtrack	soundtrack
CRELP 250	1999	Le Tone	Le petit nabab	
CRELP251	1999-08-03	Guided by Voices	Do the Collapse	
CRELP 252	N/A	Oasis	Standing on the Shoulder of Giants	unissued (Note: released on Big Brother in 2000)
CRECD 253	1999-05	Ed Ball	Why Do I Need a Gun I'm Chelsea	compilation
CRELP 254	N/A	Super Furry Animals	unissued	unissued
CRELP 255	N/A	Tailgunner	unissued	unissued

=== Singles ===
Catalog number	Date released	Artist	Title	Format(s)	Released on	Notes
001	1983-08	The Legend!	"'73 in '83"	7"	non-album single	
002	1984-02	The Revolving Paint Dream	"Flowers in the Sky"	7"	non-album single	
003	1984-02	Biff Bang Pow!	"Fifty Years of Fun"	7"	non-album single	
004	1984-03	Jasmine Minks	"Think!"	7"	non-album single	
005	1984-03	The Pastels	"Something Going On"	7"	non-album single	
006	1984-08	The X-Men	"Do the Ghost"	7"	non-album single	
007	1984-06	Biff Bang Pow!	"There Must Be a Better Life"	7"	Pass the Paintbrush, Honey....	
008	1984-08	Jasmine Minks	"Where the Traffic Goes"	7"	One Two Three Four Five Six Seven, All Good Preachers Go to Heaven	
009	1984-09	The Loft	"Why Does the Rain?"	7"	non-album single	
010	1984-10	The Legend!	"Destroys the Blues"	7"	non-album single	
CRE 011(T)	1984-11	The Pastels	"Million Tears"	12"	non-album single	
CRE 012	1984-11	The Jesus and Mary Chain	"Upside Down"	7"	non-album single	
CRE 013	1985-05	The X-Men	"Spiral Girl"	7"	non-album single	
CRE 014	1985-04	Les Zarjaz	"One Charmyng Nyte"	7"	non-album single	
CRE 015	1985-05	The Loft	"Up the Hill and Down the Slope"	7", 12"	non-album single	
CRE 016	1985-10	The Bodines	"God Bless" / "Paradise"	7"	non-album single	
CRE 017	1985-06	Primal Scream	"All Fall Down"	7"	non-album single	
CRE 018	1985-07	Jasmine Minks	"What's Happening"	7"	non-album single	
CRE 019	1985-07	Slaughter Joe	"I'll Follow You Down"	7", 12"	non-album single	
CRE 020	1985-09	Meat Whiplash	"Don't Slip Up"	7"	non-album single	
CRE 021T	1985-08	Five Go Down to the Sea?	"Singing in Braille"	12"	non-album single	
CRE 022T	1985-12	The Moodists	"Justice and Money Too"	12"	non-album single	
CRE 023T	1985-12	The Pastels	"I'm Alright with You"	12"	non-album single	
CRE 024	1986-04	Biff Bang Pow!	"Love's Going Out of Fashion"	7", 12"	The Girl Who Runs the Beat Hotel	
CRE 025	1986-05	The Jasmine Minks	"Cold Heart"	7", 12"	The Jasmine Minks	
CRE 026	1986-05	Primal Scream	"Crystal Crescent"	7", 12"	non-album single	
CRE 027	1986-05	Felt	"Ballad of the Band"	7", 12"	non-album single	
CRE 028	1986-03	The Bodines	"Therese"	7", 12"	non-album single	
CRE 029	1986-06	The Weather Prophets	"Almost Prayed"	7", 12", 2×7"	Diesel River	
CRE 030	1986-08	The Bodines	"Heard It All"	7", 12"	non-album single	
CRE 031T	1986-10	The Weather Prophets	"Naked as the Day You Were Born"	7", 12"	non-album single	
CRE 032	1986-10	Felt	"Rain of Crystal Spires"	7", 12"	Forever Breathes the Lonely Word	
CRE 033	1986-10	Nikki Sudden	"Jangle Town"		Texas	
CRE 034T	1986-11	JC Brouchard with Biff Bang Pow!	"Someone Stole My Wheels"	7", 12"	The Girl Who Runs the Beat Hotel	
CRE 035	1986-12	Slaughter	"She's So Out of Touch"	7", 12"	non-album single	
CRE 036	1987-03	Phil Wilson	"Waiting for a Change"		non-album single	
CRE 037T	1986-10	Momus	"Murderers, the Hope of Women"		The Poison Boyfriend	
CRE 038	1987-02	Biff Bang Pow!	"The Whole World's Turning Brouchard!"	7"	The Girl Who Runs the Beat Hotel	
CRE 039 T	1987-03	Bill Drummond	"The King of Joy"		The Man	
CRE 040T	1987-08	Nikki Sudden and Rowland S. Howard	"Wedding Hotel"		Kiss You Kidnapped Charabanc	
CRE 041	1987-04	Baby Amphetamine	"Chernobyl Baby"		non-album single	
CRE 042	1987-06	Clive Langer	"Even Though"		non-album single	
CRE 043 T	1987-05	The House of Love	"Shine On"	12"	non-album single	
CRE 044 T	1987-06	The House of Love	"Real Animal"	12"	non-album single	
CRE 045	1987-06	Blow-Up	"Good for Me"	7", 12"	non-album single	
CRE 046	1987-06	Phil Wilson	"Ten Miles"		non-album single	
CRE 047	1987-04	Edwyn Collins	"Don't Shilly Shally"	7", 12"	non-album single	white label
CRE 048T	1987-07	Felt	"Final Resting of the Ark"	12"	non-album single	
CRE 049T	1987-07	Blow-Up	"Pool Valley"	12"	non-album single	
CRE 050T	1988-02	Emily	Irony	12"	EP	
CRE 051 T	1988-03	Biff Bang Pow!	"She Haunts"	12"	Love Is Forever	
CRE 052	1988-03	Apple Boutique	"Love Resistance"		non-album single	
CRE 053T	1988-05	The House of Love	"Christine"	12"	The House of Love	
CRE 054	1988-05	The Weather Prophets	"Hollow Heart"		Judges, Juries and Horsemen	
CRE 055(T)	1988-08	My Bloody Valentine	"You Made Me Realise"	12"	non-album single	
CRE 056	1988-08	The Weather Prophets	"Always the Light"		Judges, Juries and Horsemen	
CRE 057	1988-08	The House of Love	"Destroy the Heart"	7", 12"	non-album single	
CRE 058	1988-10	Pacific	Sea of Sand EP		EP	
CRE 059T	1988-11	The Jazz Butcher	"Spooky"	12"	non-album single	
CRE 060T	1988-11	Felt	"Space Blues"	12"	non-album single	
CRE 061 T	1988-11	My Bloody Valentine	"Feed Me with Your Kiss"	12"	Isn't Anything	
CRE 062	1989-01	The Revolving Paint Dream	"Green Sea Blue" / "Sun, Sea, Sand"	7"	Mother Watch Me Burn	
CRE 063(T)	1989-04	Momus	"The Hairstyle of the Devil"		Don't Stop the Night	
CRE 064	1989-03	Pacific	"Shrift"		Inference	
CRE 065	1989-05	Tangerine	"Sunburst"		Tangerine	
CRE 066T	1989-10	Something Pretty Beautiful	"Freefall"		Something Pretty Beautiful	
CRE 067	1989-08	Primal Scream	"Ivy Ivy Ivy"		Primal Scream	
CRE 068	1989-09	Counterfeit	"Good Samaritan"		non-album single	
CRE 069	1989-10	The Jazz Butcher	"New Invention"		Big Planet Scarey Planet	
CRE 070	1990-03	Primal Scream	"Loaded"		Screamadelica	
CRE 071	1990-01	The Times	"Manchester"		E for Edward	
CRE 072T	1990-01-15	Ride	Ride	12", CD	EP	compiled on Smile
CRE 073	1990-05	My Bloody Valentine	"Soon"	7"	Loveless	
CRE 073T	1990-05	My Bloody Valentine	Glider EP	12"	EP	
CRE 074T	1990-04	Something Pretty Beautiful	"Freak Outburst"	12"	Something Pretty Beautiful	unreleased?
CRE 075T	1990-04-02	Ride	Play	12", CD	EP	compiled on Smile
CRE 076	1990-04	Love Corporation	"Palatial"		Tones	
CRE 077	1990-04	The Jazz Butcher	"Girl Go"		Cult of the Basement	
CRE 078	1990-08	Primal Scream	"Come Together"		Screamadelica	
CRE 079T	1990-04	Swervedriver	"Son of Mustang Ford"	12", CD	Raise	
CRE 080	1990-07	Sheer Taft feat. Mito	"Cascades"		non-album single	
CRE 081(T)	1990-04	The Telescopes	"Precious Little"		non-album single	
CRE 082	1990-08	Hypnotone	"Dream Beam"		Hypnotone	
CRE 083T	1990-07	J.B.C.	"We Love You"		non-album single	
CRE 084	1990-09	Pressure Zone	"Johannesburg"		non-album single	
CRE 085	1991-02	My Bloody Valentine	"To Here Knows When"	7"	Loveless	
CRE 085T	1991-02	My Bloody Valentine	Tremolo E.P.	12"	EP	
CRE 086T(X/TP)	1990-09	Love Corporation	"Give Me Some Love"		non-album single	
CRE 087T	1990-09-17	Ride	Fall	12", CD	EP	
CRE 088T	1990-11	Swervedriver	"Rave Down"	12", CD	Raise	
CRE 089	1990-10	Hypnotone	"Hypnotonic"		non-album single	
CRE 090	1990-09	Fluke	"Philly"		The Techno Rose of Blighty	
CRE 091	1990-11	Son of Shoom	"I Hate Hate"		non-album single	
CRE 092	1990-12	The Telescopes	"Everso"		non-album single	
CRE 093T	1990-11-05	Slowdive	"Slowdive"	12", CD	non-album single	
CRE 094	1990-12	Peter Astor	"Walk into the Wind"		Submarine	
CRE 095	1990-11	Crazy Eddie and QQ	"Nena de Ibiza"		non-album single	
CRE 096	1991-06	Primal Scream	"Higher than the Sun"		Screamadelica	
CRE 097	1991-01	World Unite	"World Unite"		non-album single	
CRE 098T	1991-02	Slowdive	"Morningrise"	12", CD	non-album single	
CRE 099	1991-03	Peter Astor	"Chevron"		Submarine	
CRE 100T	1991-03-04	Ride	Today Forever	12", CD, CS	EP	
CRE 101	1991-03	Moonshake	First EP		EP	
CRE 102	1991-08	Swervedriver	"Sandblasted"	7", 12", CD	Raise	
CRE 103(TP)	1991-02	The Telescopes	"Celeste"		non-album single	
CRE 104	1991-05	The Lilac Time	"Dreaming"	7", 12", CD, CS	Astronauts	
CRE 105	1991-08	Teenage Fanclub	"Star Sign"		Bandwagonesque	
CRE 106	1991-08	Bass Bumpers	"Can't Stop Dancing"		non-album single	
CRE 107	1991-07	MC Orchestra	"Urgent Power"		non-album single	
CRE 108	1991-07	The Telescopes	"Flying"		The Telescopes	
CRE 109	1991-08	Sheer Taft feat. Mito	"Atlantis"		non-album single	
CRE 110	1991-08	Primal Scream	"Don't Fight It, Feel It"		Screamadelica	
CRE 111	1991-02	Teenage Fanclub	"The Concept"		Bandwagonesque	
CRE 112	1991-06	Slowdive	"Catch the Breeze"	7"	Just for a Day	
CRE 112T	1991-06	Slowdive	Holding Our Breath	12", CD	EP	
CRE 113T	1991-08	Silverfish	Fuckin' Drivin' or What... E.P.		EP	
CRE 114	1991-11	The Times / Peter Astor	"Lundi bleu" / "Der Kaiser, der Dealer und das Geburtstagskind"		split single	
CRE 115	1992-02	Teenage Fanclub	"What You Do to Me"		Bandwagonesque	
CRE 116	1993	Hollyfaith	"Bliss"		Purrrr	
CRE 117	1992-01	Primal Scream	Dixie-Narco EP		EP	
CRE 118	1992-03	Silverfish	Silverfish with Scrambled Eggs		EP	
CRE 119T	1993-05	Slowdive	Outside Your Room EP	12", CD	EP; Souvlaki	"Alison"
CRE 120	1992-05	Swervedriver	"Never Lose That Feeling"	7", 12", CD	non-album single	reissued on Mezcal Head
CRE 121	N/A	unissued	unissued	unissued	unissued	unissued
CRE 122T	1992-05	Velvet Crush	The Post-Greatness E.P.	12", CD	EP	
CRE 123T	1992-02-03	Ride	"Leave Them All Behind"	12", CD	Going Blank Again	
CRE 124	1992-02	The Boo Radleys	Adrenalin E.P.		EP	
CRE 125	N/A	Love Corporation	unissued	unissued	unissued	unissued
CRE 126	1992-08	Sugar	"Changes"		Copper Blue	
CRE 127	1992-04	Adorable	"Sunshine Smile"		non-album single	reissued on Against Perfection
CRE 128	1992-06	The Boo Radleys	Boo! Forever		EP	
CRE 129	1994-03	Primal Scream	"Rocks"		Give Out but Don't Give Up	
CRE 130	1993-06-14	Teenage Fanclub	"Radio"		Thirteen	
CRE 131	1992-12	BMX Bandits	"Serious Drugs"		Life Goes On	
CRE 132	1992-10	Medalark 11	"I Call Your Name"		non-album single	
CRE 133	1992-07	Adorable	"I'll Be Your Saint"		non-album single	reissued on Against Perfection
CRE 134	1992-05	Momus	"Spacewalk"		Voyager	
CRE 135	1992-07	Medicine	"Aruca"		Shot Forth Self Living	
CRE 136	1993-08	Swervedriver	"Duel"	7", 12", CD	Mezcal Head	
CRE 137	1992-11	The Boo Radleys	"Lazarus"		Giant Steps	
CRE 138(T)	1993-03	Silverfish	Damn Fine EP		EP	
CRE 139	1993	Velvet Crush	"Drive Me Down"	12", CD	In the Presence of Greatness	
CRE 140	1992-10	Adorable	"Homeboy"		Against Perfection	
CRE 141	1993-01	Medicine	"5ive"		Shot Forth Self Living	
CRE 142	1993-09-20	Teenage Fanclub	"Norman 3"		Thirteen	
CRE 143	1992-10	Sugar	"A Good Idea"		Copper Blue	
CRE 144	1993-08	Medalark 11	"Smoke"		non-album single	
CRE 145	1994-06	Primal Scream	"Jailbird"		Give Out but Don't Give Up	
CRE 146(T)	1994	Velvet Crush	"Hold Me Up"	7", 12", CD	Teenage Symphonies to God	
CRE 147	1993-07	The Boo Radleys	"I Hang Suspended"		Giant Steps	
CRE 148	1994-04	18 Wheeler	"Kum Back"		Twin Action	
CRE 149	1993-01	Sugar	"If I Can't Change Your Mind"		Copper Blue	
CRE 150T	1992-04-13	Ride	"Twisterella"	12", CD	Going Blank Again	
CRE 151	1993-05	A Certain Ratio	"Shack Up"		non-album single	
CRE 152	1993-02	Poster Children	"Clock Street"		Tool of the Man	
CRE 153	1993-01	Adorable	"Sistine Chapel Ceiling"		Against Perfection	
CRE 154(T)	1993-07	BMX Bandits	"Kylie's Got a Crush on Us"		Life Goes On	
CRE 155T	1994-04-18	Ride	"Birdman"	12", CD	Carnival of Light	
CRE 156	1993-08	Sugar	"Tilted"		Beaster	
CRE 157T	1993-11	Slowdive	5 EP	12", CD	EP	
CRE 157TR	1993-11	Slowdive	5 EP (In Mind Remixes)	12", CD	remix EP	
CRE 158	1993-05	The Times feat. Tippa Irie	"Finnegan's Break"		Alternative Commercial Crossover	
CRE 159	1993-04	Adorable	"Favourite Fallen Idol"		Against Perfection	
CRE 160		Dreadzone	"The Warning"		360°	
CRE 161	1994-04	Idha	"Get Undressed"		Melody Inn	
CRE 162	1993-06	The Times	"Baby Girl"		Alternative Commercial Crossover	
CRE 163	N/A	The Jazz Butcher	unissued		unissued	unissued
CRE 164	N/A	Dreadzone	"The Good, the Bad and the Dread"		360°	unissued
CRE 165	1995	Ruby	"Paraffin"		Salt Peter	
CRE 166	1994-10	Idha	"A Woman in a Man's World"		non-album single	
CRE 167	1995-03	The Jazz Butcher Conspiracy	"Sixteen Years"		Illuminate	
CRE 168	1993-11	BMX Bandits	"Little Hands"		Life Goes On	
CRE 169	1993-10	The Boo Radleys	"Wish I Was Skinny"		Giant Steps	
CRESCD170	1995	Velvet Crush	"Why Not Your Baby"	CD	Teenage Symphonies to God	
CRE 171	N/A	Slaughter Joe	unissued	unissued	unissued	unissued
CRE 172	1994-04	Adorable	"Kangaroo Court"		Fake	
CRE 173		Ruby	"Tiny Meat"		Salt Peter	
CRE 174T	1994-02	Swervedriver	"Last Train to Satansville"	12", CD	Mezcal Head	
CRE 175	1995-04	Teenage Fanclub	"Mellow Doubt"		Grand Prix	
CRE 176	1994-04	Oasis	"Supersonic"		Definitely Maybe	
CRE 177	1997-09	Adorable	"Vendetta"		Fake	
CRE 178	1994-02	The Boo Radleys	"Barney (...and Me)"		Giant Steps	
CRE 179T	1995-06	Swervedriver	"Last Day on Earth"	12", CD	Ejector Seat Reservation	
CRE 180	1994-10	The Cramps	"Ultra Twist!"	7", 12", CD	Flamejob	
CRE 181	1994-04	BMX Bandits	"Serious Drugs"		Life Goes On	
CRE 182	1994-07	Oasis	"Shakermaker"		Definitely Maybe	
CRE 183	1994-12	Primal Scream	"(I'm Gonna) Cry Myself Blind"		Give Out but Don't Give Up	
CRE 184	1994-06-13	Ride	"How Does It Feel to Feel?"	7", 12", CD	Carnival of Light	
CRE 185	1994-08	Oasis	"Live Forever"		Definitely Maybe	
CRE 186	1997-09	Sugar	"Your Favourite Thing"		File Under: Easy Listening	
CRE 187T	1994-06	The Boo Radleys	Lazarus (Remixes)		non-album single	reissued on Giant Steps
CRE 188	1994-07	18 Wheeler	"The Revealer"		Twin Action	
CRE 189T	1994-09-26	Ride	"I Don't Know Where It Comes From"	12", CD1, CD2, CS	from Carnival of Light	
CRE 190	1994-10	Oasis	"Cigarettes & Alcohol"		Definitely Maybe	
CRE 191	1995-03	The Boo Radleys	"Wake Up Boo!"		Wake Up!	
CRE 192	1995-03	BMX Bandits	"Gettin' Dirty"		Gettin' Dirty	
CRE 193	1994-10	Sugar	"Believe What You're Saying"		File Under: Easy Listening	
CRE 194	1996-06	Primal Scream, Irvine Welsh & On-U-Sound System	"The Big Man and the Scream Team Meet the Barmy Army Uptown"		non-album single	
CRE 195	1994-12	Oasis	"Whatever"		non-album single	
CRESCD 196	1995-02	The Cramps	"Naked Girl Falling Down Stairs"	CD	Flamejob	
CRE 197	1995-04	Edward Ball	"If a Man Ever Loved a Woman"		If a Man Ever Loved a Woman	
CRE 198	1995-04	18 Wheeler	"Boddha"		Formanka	
CRE 199T	1996-02-12	Ride	"Black Nite Crash"	12", CD	Tarantula	
CRE 200		The Creation	"Creation"		Power Surge	
CRE 201	1995-05-22	Teenage Fanclub	"Sparky's Dream"		Grand Prix	
CRE 202	1995-05	The Boo Radleys	"Find the Answer Within"		Wake Up!	
CRE 203	1995-07	Heavy Stereo	"Sleep Freak"		non-album single	
CRE 204	1995-05	Oasis	"Some Might Say"		(What's the Story) Morning Glory?	
CRE 205	1995-06	Idha	"Sorry Sorry"		Troublemaker	
CRE 206	1998-08	Bob Mould	"Classifieds"		The Last Dog and Pony Show	
CRE 207	1995-08	BMX Bandits	"Love, Come to Me"		Gettin' Dirty	
CRE 208	1995-06	Edward Ball	"It's Kinda Lonely Where I Am"		If a Man Ever Loved a Woman	
CRE 209	1995-06	18 Wheeler	"Steel Guitars"		Formanka	
CRE 210	1995-09	Teenage Fanclub	"Neil Jung"		Grand Prix	
CRE 211	1995-07	The Boo Radleys	"It's Lulu"		Wake Up!	
CRE 212	1995-08	Oasis	"Roll with It"		(What's the Story) Morning Glory?	
CRE 213	1995-10	Heavy Stereo	"Smiler"		non-album single	
CRE 214	1995-10	The Boo Radleys	"From the Bench at Belvedere"		non-album single	
CRE 215	1995-11	Oasis	"Wonderwall"		(What's the Story) Morning Glory?	
CRE 216	1995-12-11	Teenage Fanclub	Teenage Fanclub Have Lost It		EP	acoustic
CRE 217	1996	Crawl	"Sourface"		non-album single	
CRE 218	1996-02	Heavy Stereo	"Chinese Burn"		Déjà Voodoo	
CRE 219	1996-08	18 Wheeler	"The Hours and Times"		Year Zero	
CRE 220	1996-08	The Boo Radleys	"What's in the Box? (See Whatcha Got)"		C'mon Kids	
CRE 221	1996-03	Oasis	"Don't Look Back in Anger"		(What's the Story) Morning Glory?	
CRE 222	1996-03	Super Furry Animals	"Hometown Unicorn"		Fuzzy Logic	
CRE 223	N/A	unissued	unissued		unissued	unissued
CRE 224	1996	One True Parker	"Bubblegum"		non-album single	
CRE 225	1996-05	Eggman	"Not Bad Enough"		First Fruits	
CRE 226	1996-08	The Diggers	"Peace of Mind"		Mount Everest	
CRE 227		Ruby	"Hoops"		Salt Peter	
CRE 228	1997-06-30	Teenage Fanclub	"Ain't That Enough"		Songs from Northern Britain	
CRE 229	1996	Glen Matlock	"My Little Philistine"		Who's He Think He Is When He's At Home?	
CRE 230	1996-08	Heavy Stereo	"Mouse in a Hole"		Déjà Voodoo	
CRE 231	1996-05	Super Furry Animals	"God! Show Me Magic"		Fuzzy Logic	
CRE 232	1996-09	18 Wheeler	"Crabs"		Year Zero	
CRE 233	1996-06	Edward Ball	"The Mill Hill Self Hate Club"		Catholic Guilt	
CRE 234	1996-10	The Diggers	"Nobody's Fool"		Mount Everest	
CRE 235	1996-07	Super Furry Animals	"Something 4 the Weekend"		Fuzzy Logic	
CRE 236	1996-10	The Boo Radleys	"C'mon Kids"		C'mon Kids	
CRE 237	1996-09	BMX Bandits	"We're Gonna Shake You Down"		Theme Park	
CRE 238	1997-08	Teenage Fanclub	"I Don't Want Control of You"		Songs from Northern Britain	
CRE 239	1996-09	Ed Ball	"Trailblaze"		Catholic Guilt	
CRE 240		Toaster	Craska Vegas EP		EP	
CRE 241	1996-11	18 Wheeler	"Prozac Beats"		Year Zero	
CRE 242	1996	Sumosonic	"Come Friendly Spaceman"		This Is Sumo	
CRE 243	1996-10	Super Furry Animals	"If You Don't Want Me to Destroy You"		Fuzzy Logic	
CRE 244	1997-02	Ed Ball	"Love Is Blue"		Catholic Guilt	
CRE 245	1997-05	Primal Scream	"Kowalski"		Vanishing Point	
CRE 246	N/A	unissued	unissued		unissued	unissued
CRE 247	1996-12	Super Furry Animals	"The Man Don't Give a Fuck"		non-album single	
CRE 248	1997-02	The Boo Radleys	"Ride the Tiger"		C'mon Kids	
CRE 249	1997-03	18 Wheeler	"Stay"		Year Zero	
CRE 250	1997-01	3 Colours Red	"Nuclear Holiday"		Pure	
CRE 251	1997	Ultra Living	"Sweetest Pleasure"		Monochromatic Adventure	
CRE 252	1997-05	Super Furry Animals	"Hermann ♥'s Pauline"		Radiator	
CRE 253	1997-05	Hurricane #1	"Step into My World"		Hurricane #1	
CRE 254	1997-03	3 Colours Red	"Sixty Mile Smile"		Pure	
CRE 255	1997-04	18 Wheeler	"Grease"		Year Zero	
CRE 256	1997-07	Oasis	"D'You Know What I Mean?"		Be Here Now	
CRE 257	1997-04	Arnold	"Twist"		non-album single	
CRE 258	N/A	Ruby	unissued		unissued	unissued
CRE 259	1997-02	The Diggers	"O.K. Alright"		Mount Everest	
CRE 260	1997-04	Ed Ball	"The Mill Hill Self Hate Club"		Catholic Guilt	
CRE 261	N/A	unissued	unissued		unissued	unissued
CRE 262	1997-06	Nick Heyward	"Today"		The Apple Bed	
CRE 263	1997-06	Primal Scream	"Star"		Vanishing Point	
CRE 264	1997-07	Hurricane #1	"Just Another Illusion"		Hurricane #1	
CRE 265	1997-05	3 Colours Red	"Pure"		Pure	
CRE 266	N/A	Ed Ball	"Controversial Girlfriend"		unissued; Catholic Guilt	
CRE 267	1997-07	Nick Heyward	"The Man Used to Be"		The Apple Bed	
CRE 268	1997-07	Idha	"Going Down South"		Troublemaker	
CRE 269	1997-07	Super Furry Animals	"The International Language of Screaming"		Radiator	
CRE 270	1997-07	3 Colours Red	"Copper Girl"		Pure	
CRE 271	1997-09	Hurricane #1	"Chain Reaction"		Hurricane #1	
CRE 272	1997-10	Primal Scream	"Burning Wheel"		Vanishing Point	
CRE 273	N/A	unissued	unissued		unissued	
CRE 274	1997-10	Idha	"Sweet September Rain"		Troublemaker	
CRE 275	1997-10	Super Furry Animals	"Play It Cool"		Radiator	
CRE 276	1997-11	Hurricane #1	Step into My World EP		remix EP	
CRE 277	1997-11	3 Colours Red	"This Is My Hollywood"		Pure	
CRE 278	1997-10	Oasis	"Stand by Me"		Be Here Now	
CRE 279	1998-02	Saint Etienne	"Sylvie"		Good Humor	
CRE 280	1997-11	Teenage Fanclub	"Start Again"		Songs from Northern Britain	
CRE 281	1998-01	Bernard Butler	"Stay"		People Move On	
CRE 282	1998-01	Oasis	"All Around the World"		Be Here Now	
CRE 283	1997-12	Super Furry Animals	"Demons"		Radiator	
CRE 284	1998-02	Primal Scream	"If They Move, Kill 'Em"		Vanishing Point	
CRE 285	1998-02	Hurricane #1	"Only the Strongest Will Survive"		Only the Strongest Will Survive	
CRE 286	1998	Ultra Living	"Homesick"		Monochromatic Adventure	
CRE 287	1998-04	Arnold	"Fleas Don't Fly"		Hillside	
CRE 288	1998-06	Super Furry Animals	Ice Hockey Hair EP		EP	
CRE 289	1998-03	Bernard Butler	"Not Alone"		People Move On	
CRE 290	1998-05	Saint Etienne	"The Bad Photographer"		Good Humor	
CRE 291	1998-03	Nick Heyward	"Stars in Her Eyes"		The Apple Bed	
CRE 292	1998-04	The Jesus and Mary Chain	"Cracking Up"		Munki	
CRE 293	1998-06	Arnold	"Fishsounds"		Hillside	
CRE 294	N/A	unissued	unissued		unissued	
CRE 295	1998-03	William	"Tired of Fucking"		non-album single	
CRE 296	1998-05	The Jesus and Mary Chain	"I Love Rock 'n' Roll"		Munki	
CRE 297	1998-06	Bernard Butler	"A Change of Heart"		People Move On	
CRE 298	1998-06	Teenage Fanclub	"Long Shot"		non-album single	
CRE 299	1998-10	The Boo Radleys	"Free Huey"		Kingsize	
CRE 300	1998-09	Arnold	"Windsor Park"		Hillside	
CRE 301	1999	Trashmonk	"Polygamy"		Mona Lisa Overdrive	
CRE 302	1999-08	Bernard Butler	"Friends and Lovers"		Friends and Lovers	
CRE 303	1998-10	Hurricane #1	"Rising Sign"		Only the Strongest Will Survive	
CRE 304	1998-10	3 Colours Red	"Paralyse"		Revolt	
CRE 305	1999-01-18	Ronnie Spector	She Talks to Rainbows EP		EP	
CRE 306	1999-04	Technique	"Sun Is Shining"		non-album single; Pop Philosophy	album never issued
CRE 307	1999-01	One Lady Owner	"Wheelkings 1973"		There's Only We	
CRE 308	1999-01	3 Colours Red	"Beautiful Day"		Revolt	
CRE 309	1999-04	Hurricane #1	"The Greatest High"		Only the Strongest Will Survive	
CRE 310	1999-03	One Lady Owner	"I Do Need You"		There's Only We	
CRE 311	1999-05	Mishka	"Give You All the Love"		Mishka	
CRE 312	N/A	unissued	unissued		unissued	
CRE 313	1999-05	3 Colours Red	"This Is My Time"		Revolt	
CRE 314	1999-05	Super Furry Animals	"Northern Lites"		Guerrilla	
CRE 315	1999-08	Technique	"You + Me"		non-album single; Pop Philosophy	album never issued
CRE 316	1999-06	Hurricane #1	"Remote Control"		Only the Strongest Will Survive	
CRE 317	N/A	Trashmonk	unissued		unissued	
CRE 318	N/A	Technique	unissued		unissued	unissued
CRE 319	1999-05	One Lady Owner	"Police Car Sex"		There's Only We	
CRE 320	1999	Le Tone	"Joli Dragon"		Le petit nabab	
CRE 321	1999	Mishka	"Lonely"		Mishka	
CRE 322	1999-08	Kevin Rowland	"Concrete and Clay"		My Beauty	
CRE 323	1999-08	Super Furry Animals	"Fire in My Heart"		Guerrilla	
CRE 324	1999-10	Bernard Butler	"You Must Go On"		Friends and Lovers	
CRE 325	1999-10	Guided by Voices	"Teenage FBI"		Do the Collapse	
CRE 326	1999-11	Primal Scream	"Swastika Eyes"		XTRMNTR	
CRE 327	2000-02	Oasis	"Go Let It Out"		Standing on the Shoulder of Giants	
CRE 328	2000-01	Guided by Voices	"Hold On Hope"		Do the Collapse	
CRE 329	2000-01	Super Furry Animals	"Do or Die"		Guerrilla	
CRE 330	2000	Bernard Butler	"I'd Do It Again If I Could"		Friends and Lovers	unissued
CRE 331	N/A	unissued	unissued		unissued	
CRE 332	2000-04	Primal Scream	"Kill All Hippies"		XTRMNTR	
CRE 333	2000-09	Primal Scream	"Accelerator"		XTRMNTR	

=== Other ===
Catalog Number	Date released	Artist	Title	Notes
CREFREE 97	1997	Various artists	Creation for the Nation	compilation; NME cassette
CRE FRE 4	November 1988	My Bloody Valentine	Instrumental	
CX 239P		Primal Scream	Kill All Hippies / Exterminator	
DOCKERS001		Primal Scream	Come Together (Original Recording) (Promo)	
LIM 02		The Boo Radleys / The Digger$	I Want a Rainbow Nation / Passport to Rec.	
none		My Bloody Valentine	Only Shallow (Promo)	
PSTLS 1		Primal Scream meet the Two Lone Swordsmen	Stuka	
RTD/CRE 9-63		The House of Love	The House of Love	
RTD/CRE CD 6-53		Felt	Poem of the River & Forever Breathes the Lonely Word	
CRE 6-53		Felt	Poem of the River	
CREM MD 239		Primal Scream	Exterminator	
RTD/CRE 1-39	1986	Various artists	Valium Orgasm – A Creation Compilation	compilation
SAMPCS 4336		Primal Scream	Star	
SAMPCS 4563		Primal Scream	Burning Wheel (Promo)	
SAMPCS 5987		The Boo Radleys	Free Huey (Promo)	
SAMPMS 4623		Primal Scream	Burning Wheel	
SCR
SCR 471591 2		Primal Scream	Screamadelica	
SCR 474125 2		Dreadzone	360°	
SCR 474138 2		A Certain Ratio	Looking for a Certain Ratio	
SCR 475962 9		Saint Etienne	Tiger Bay	
SCR 481138 2		Ruby	Salt Peter	
SCR 483936 1		Ruby	Salt Peter Remixed: Revenge, the Sweetest Fruit	
SCR 487538 1		Primal Scream	Vanishing Point	
SCR 487538 2		Primal Scream	Vanishing Point	
SCR 488759 2		Hurricane #1	Hurricane #1	
SCR 489561 2		Saint Etienne	Good Humor	
SCR 489854 2		The Jesus and Mary Chain	Munki	
SCR 491564 2		Super Furry Animals	Out Spaced	
SCR 496525 2		Primal Scream	Exterminator	
SCR 659374 2		A Certain Ratio	Shack Up (Remixes)	
SCR 660096 1	March 1997	Primal Scream	Rocks	
SCR 660096 2	March 1994	Primal Scream	Rocks	
SCR 660687 0	December 1994	Primal Scream	(I'm Gonna) Cry Myself Blind	
SCR 662269 2		Ruby	Paraffin	
SCR 662508 2		Ruby	Tiny Meat	
SCR 663355 2	June 1996	Primal Scream, Irvine Welsh & On-U Sound	The Big Man and the Scream Team Meet the Barmy Army Uptown	
SCR 663450 2		The Boo Radleys	What's in the Box? (See Whatcha Got)	
SCR 664369 2		Primal Scream	Kowalski	
SCR 664610 2	June 1997	Primal Scream	Star	
SCR 665489 2	February 1998	Primal Scream	If They Move, Kill 'Em	
SCR 665656 1		Jesus & Mary Chain, The	Cracking Up	
SCR 666990 2		Technique	Sun Is Shining	
SCR 666994 2		Hurricane #1	The Greatest High	
SCR 667680 1		Technique	You + Me	
SCR 667680 2		Technique	You + Me	
SCR 668287 1		Primal Scream	Swastika Eyes (War Pigs)	
SCR 668287 2		Primal Scream	Swastika Eyes (War Pigs)	
SCR 668287 6	November 1999	Primal Scream	Swastika Eyes (War Pigs)	
SCR 669107 2		Primal Scream	Kill All Hippies	
SW1		Primal Scream	Swastika Eyes (Chemical Brothers Remix)	
SW2		Primal Scream	Swastika Eyes (David Holmes Remixes)	
12" promos
CTP 001		Hypnotone	Hypnotonic	
CTP 003		Primal Scream	Don't Fight It, Feel It	
CTP 151		A Certain Ratio	Shack Up (Remixes)	
CTP 164		Dreadzone	The Good the Bad and the Dread	
CTP 165		Ruby	Paraffin	
CTP 166		Ruby	Salt Water Fish (Peshay Remix)	
CTP 173		Ruby	Tiny Meat (Remixes)	
CTP 173X		Ruby	Tiny Meat	
CTP 183X		Primal Scream	Rockers Dub	
CTP 194T		Primal Scream, Irvine Welsh and On-U Sound	The Big Man and the Scream Team Meet the Barmy Army Uptown	
CTP 199		Love Corporation	Cathedrals of Glitter	
CTP 212		Oasis	Roll with It (Promo)	
CTP 216		Oasis	Round Are Way (Promo)	
CTP 219		18 Wheeler	The Hours and the Times (Promo)	
CTP 219X		18 Wheeler	The Hours and the Times	
CTP 222		Super Furry Animals	Home Town Unicorn (Promo)	
CTP 224		One True Parker	Bubble Gum (Promo)	
CTP 227		Ruby	Hoops (Remixes)	
CTP 231		Super Furry Animals	God! Show Me Magic (Promo)	
CTP 232		18 Wheeler	Crabs (Promo)	
CTP 236		Boo Radleys, The	C'Mon Kids (Promo)	
CTP 249		18 Wheeler	Stay (Promo)	
CTP 252		Super Furry Animals	Hermann Love's Pauline (Promo)	
CTP 255		18 Wheeler	Grease (Promo)	
CTP 256		Oasis	D'You Know What I Mean (Promo)	
CTP 276X		Hurricane #1	Step into My World	
CTP 284		Primal Scream	If They Move Kill 'Em	
CTP 285		Hurricane #1	Only the Strongest Will Survive	
CTP 286		Ultra Living	Freeze, Die & Revive	
CTP 290		Saint Etienne	Bronx Dogs Mixes	
CTP 290X		Saint Etienne	Kid Loco Mixes	
CTP 292		Jesus & Mary Chain, The	Cracking Up (Promo)	
CTP 299		Boo Radleys, The	Free Huey (Promo)	
CTP 306		Technique	Sun Is Shining	
CTP 306X		Technique	Sun Is Shining	
CTP 309		Hurricane #1	The Greatest High	
CTP 311		Mishka	Give You All the Love (Promo)	
CTP 315		Technique	U+Me / Sun Is Shining (Matt Darey Mixes)	
CTP 315X		Technique	You + Me (Promo)	
CTP 318		Technique	Sun Is Shining	
CTP 320X		Le Tone	Joli Dragon	
CTP 321		Mishka	Lonely	
CTP 321X		Mishka	Lonely	
CTP 332		Primal Scream	Kill All Hippies (Promo)	
CTP 332X		Primal Scream	Kill All Hippies (Promo)	
Remixes
CRESCD 157		Slowdive	5 EP	
CRESCD 157R		Slowdive	5 EP (In Mind Remixes)	
CRESCD 189		Ride	I Don't Know Where It Comes From	
CRESCD 189R		Ride	I Don't Know Where It Comes From (Remix)	
CRESCD 279		Saint Etienne	Sylvie	
CRESCD 279X		Saint Etienne	Sylvie (Remixes)	
Cassettes
CRECS 117		Primal Scream	Dixie Narco EP	
CRECS 212		Oasis	Roll with It	
CRECS 256		Oasis	D'You Know What I Mean?	
CRECS 326		Primal Scream	Swastika Eyes	

== See also ==
- List of record labels
