= Doing God's Work – A Creation Compilation =

Doing God's Work - A Creation Compilation

Compilation album by Various Artists
- Released: October 1987
- Genre: Indie rock
- Length: 29:35
- Label: Creation Records

Various Artists chronology
Purveyors of Taste (1986)	Doing God's Work - A Creation Compilation (1987)	Doing It For The Kids (1988)

Professional ratings
Review scores
Source	Rating
AllMusic	3/5 stars
New Musical Express	8/10

Doing God's Work – A Creation Compilation is a various artists compilation album of British indie music released in 1987 by Creation Records. The album was released in vinyl and CD format.

== Background ==
It is with Doing God's Work that Creation "demonstrates the label's first signs of branching out sonically," says Andy Kellman at AllMusic, "such that the label no longer remained a rumpus room for Nuggets fans."

== Artists ==
Phil Wilson remembers that in 1987 Alan McGee wanted Creation to be the UK equivalent of the Elektra label, "and he reckoned I could be Creation's Country Joe." Wilson's band The June Brides had in 1986 supported The Smiths on tour, and Anthony Strutt at Penny Black Music felt "Ten Miles" had "the flame of the Smiths burning brightly in the background".

Biff Bang Pow! may have "played second fiddle to McGee's work promoting the other bands on his label", but his own band produced "a well-rounded, exciting and accomplished work" in 1987 album Oblivion, from which "In A Mourning Town" is taken.

Momus moved to Creation from él Records in 1987; from his second album, "Murderers, the Hope of Women" exemplifies the "huge jolt of Punk attitude" he brings to his Serge Gainsbourg-influenced meditations on the darker side of life.

The House of Love "made their debut with a classy calling card in the 'Shine On' single", says Ian Canty at Louder Than War. After their 1988 first album "they did score some hits with Fontana, (but) the fact that 'Shine On' was their biggest underlines how they never really escaped from the shadow of their early glory" at Creation.

The Jasmine Minks "helped define (Creation)'s early sound" between 1984 and 1989, says Tim Sendra at AllMusic: "jangling, heartfelt, and with Byrds influences on their sleeve"; "Cut Me Deep" was the highlight of a "calmer, more thoughtful" era the band settled into on albums Another Age (1988) and Scratch the Surface (1989).

"The David Westlake of this period was firing on all cylinders," says Kieron Tyler at The Arts Desk. Despite his "presence on C86 ... what he was doing wasn't defined by any such tag", From his first solo record, "The Word Around Town" was a way station on the way to finding a permanent line-up of his band The Servants, which between 1987 and 1991 included Luke Haines.

Nikki Sudden moved to Creation from Glass Records in 1986; Thom Jurek at AllMusic calls "the desolate ... 'Kiss at Dawn,' where (Rowland S. Howard) gets to do his sonic, post-psych thing on guitar ... one of the eeriest tracks in Sudden's catalog"; it comes from "bent and dark" 1987 album Dead Men Tell No Tales.

Blow-Up's two 1987 singles for Creation "bore testimony to the band's enthusiasm for 60s garage punk, though their influences ranged from psychedelia to disco and electro"; Dutch label Megadisc issued their Creation recordings and demos on 1988 compilation Rollercoaster.

== Track listing ==
=== Side one ===
1. Phil Wilson: "Ten Miles" – 3:02
2. Biff Bang Pow: "In a Mourning Town" – 2:37
3. Momus: "Murderers" – 5:18
4. The House of Love: "Shine On" – 3:20

=== Side two ===
1. The Jasmine Minks: "Cut me Deep" – 3:26
2. David Westlake: "The Word Around Town" – 3:35
3. Nikki Sudden & the Jacobites: "Kiss at Dawn" – 5:23
4. Blow-Up: "Catch Me" – 2:54
