= Special Needs (band) =

UK rock group

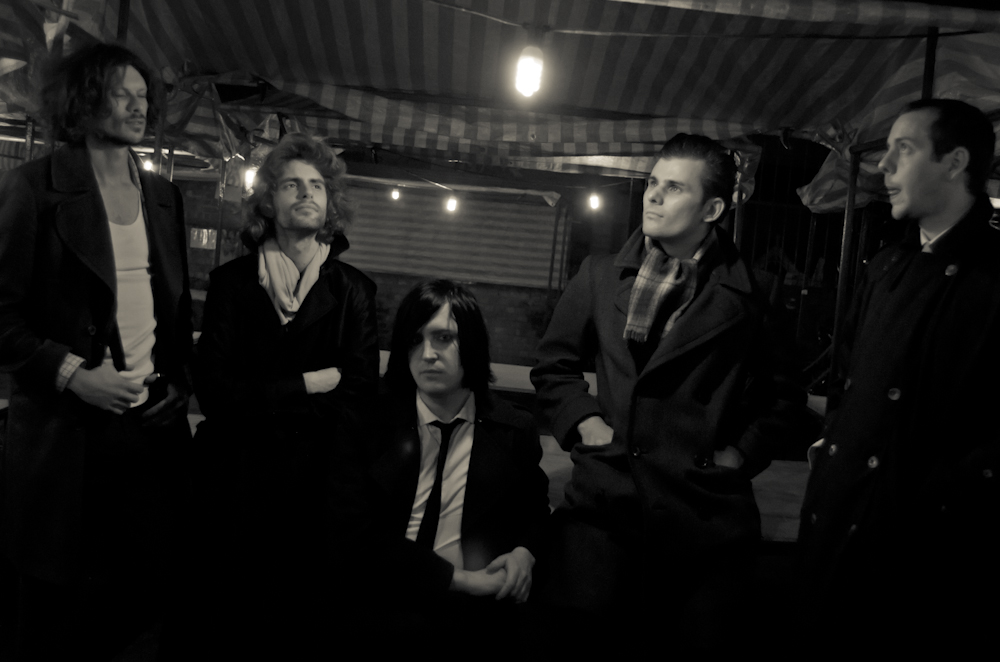

Background information
- Origin: London, England
- Genre: Indie rock
- Years active: 1998–2005, 2011-2012
- Labels: Poptones/Mercury Music/(UK) (Universal Music Group); Label type: Major
- Members: Neil Allan; Phillip James; Andrew Pearson; Daniel Shack; Zachery Stephenson
- Past members: Nicholas Bukowski; Yuri Zhislin; Jamie McLoughlin; Tom Horsfield; Jon Odgers

Special Needs (briefly known as ‘The Needs’) were a five-piece alternative rock group formed in London, England in 1998. They disbanded in 2005, reformed in 2011 with the group's comeback including a first tour for over six years in November 2011. The group disbanded for a second time towards the end of 2012.

== History ==
The idea of the band was in initiated in early summer 1998 by London guitarist Daniel Shack and Irish singer Zachery Stephenson. Shack recruited school friend Philip James to play bass although activity in the first year never got beyond practice rooms.

Shack and James moved to University of Sheffield in the autumn of 1998 and it appeared that the band would never get off the ground. However, at Sheffield, Shack and James met Andrew Pearson who would join the band on rhythm guitar and convinced Stephenson that the band could still work despite the not inconsiderate geographical distance between members. They played their debut gig in September 1999 at the Bull & Gate, Kentish Town under the name 'Panacea', having originally considered the name 'Mute Witness'. Several drummers played with the band during the first year, the first of these being former BBC Radio 2 Young Musician of the Year (as a violinist) Yuri Zhislin.

The band relocated to London in 2001 and deployed former The Men They Couldn't Hang drummer Jon Odgers. At this time the group, tired with pleading with venues for gigs, started their own clubnight called ‘Funfairs & Heartbreak’ after a lyric from their demo ‘Stick Around.’

At the end of 2002 Neil Allan was recruited on drums and would continue in this role until the band's original disbandment.

In 2003, the band began to play more high-profile gigs, as John Kennedy of London station Xfm and others began to champion them. All of the band's singles became ‘Single of the Week.’ on Kennedy's Xposure programme At the start of 2004, Twinstar Revolution released the double a-sided single ‘Sylvia’ and ‘Tarts.’ The single was met with some critical acclaim but did not chart.

The band formed close alliances with other bands on the London scene such as The Rocks, The Barbs and Cherubs and embarked on two UK tours with the former two.

In the summer of 2004, former Creation Records boss Alan McGee signed the band to his Poptones label and they released the single ‘Francesca,’ which entered the British charts at number 69.

The band's profile continued to rise as the video was featured frequently on MTV2 and by the end of the year they had signed to Mercury Records. There was also interest from Rough Trade but they failed to officially declare firm interest until the day after the group had signed to Mercury

In September 2004, the band flew to Belfast at the request of Johnny Borrell of Razorlight to support them at their Rizla ‘Inspired By’ gig at Belfast Empire. Borrell also named Andrew Pearson as a person who should have been included in NME's 2004 Cool List.

Possibly the most tumultuous incident in the band's history occurred around this time, when a clearly intoxicated Stephenson punched Pearson on stage at the Infinity in Mayfair whilst wearing a Batman costume and for a while the continuation of the band appeared to be in doubt. Management moved swiftly to address certain issues and the band continued to function. Q magazine chose the band as one of their acts to look out for in 2005.

On New Year's Eve 2004, the band played their biggest gig at the London Forum. In March 2005 the band began recording their album ‘Funfairs and Heartbreak’ at 2 kHz studio in Kensal Green with Ian Grimble who had previously engineered albums for Manic Street Preachers and Travis. The band's third single Blue Skies was released in June 2005 and entered the charts at number 56. The band embarked on several UK tours and on the sold out London leg of the tour stopped traffic by arriving at the venue in motorized dodgem cars. The single was runner-up for the NME's Single of the Week and Single of the Week by Tom Robinson on his BBC 6 Music show. The band played the 2005 Glastonbury Festival, the 02 Wireless Festival in Hyde Park and partook in Channel 4's Road to V competition although they lost out to The Young Knives who coincidentally supported Special Needs around this time on an NME Tour.

In the autumn of 2005, Mercury Records decided to cancel the band's recording contract. New label management culled many of the bands around this time, including several other bands that had also started out on Alan McGee's Poptones label such as Thee Unstrung, The Boxer Rebellion (band) and The Others.

At this point, the band decided to change their name to The Needs as, despite being fond of the name (and contesting suggestions it was ableist)they felt it had long been a hindrance, anecdotally quoting one booking agent who refused to even listen to their record simply because of their name.

After several months of discussions with various labels about releasing the album, no offer was on the table and feeling that they were starting to go backwards the band decided to break up.

During 2006 the members of the band were approached by ReAction records with a view to releasing the album. It was released (under the resumed moniker of Special Needs) in August 2006 to critical acclaim, with the NME giving it 8/10 and The Sun and The Independent on Sunday offering glowing reviews. The only exception being a fairly negative review (two stars out of five) in Q by John Robinson, who ironically had previously described the band as ‘essential’ on his Channel 4 teletext column.

On 1 January 2011 the band announced via Facebook that they had reformed with Nicholas Bukowski (formerly of The Rocks) replacing Neil Allan on drums, who had returned to his home country of Scotland. They played their first gig back together at Proud Galleries in Camden on 15 February 2011 and went on to play their first gigs outside the UK in Bergen and New York City. The band embarked on a UK tour in November alongside Jesse Malin and the St Mark's Social and released a new digital single "I Agree With Nick/Stuck in Human Resources" on 28 November 2011, their first new material for six years. The reunion was short-lived though and the group's last gig was at the 2012 Hop Farm Festival, headlined by Bob Dylan. They announced their second break-up on 13 October 2012, accompanied by the free release of their last two recordings, 'Back in the Day' and 'It's Over'.

In between the band's first break-up and following their second one, Stephenson continued to be active as a musician, performing in Cork and London-based bands The Refuseniks, The Bon Vivants and Arms as well as performance contributions to various film and TV projects such as Sara Pascoe’s BBC sitcom ‘Out Of Her Mind’, Bill Condon’s thriller ‘The Good Liar’ and the Netflix true crime series ‘Sophie: A Murder in West Cork’.

== Singles ==
- "Sylvia/Tarts" (on Twinstar Revolution)(2003) – did not chart UK
- "Francesca " (Poptones)(2004) – UK Chart # 69 UK
- "Blue Skies" (Poptones/Mercury)(2005) – UK Chart # 56 UK
- "I Agree With Nick/Stuck in Human Resources" (Self-released)(2011) – did not chart UK

== Albums ==
- Funfairs and Heartbreak (2006)
