= Alan Hake =

British musician

Alan Hake is the co-founder of Must Destroy Records, but was also a key figure in many important Scottish underground bands of the late 1980s and early 1990s. He was a key member of Exploding Tortoise. Hake went on to be a founder member of 18 Wheeler, signed to Creation Records in the early 1990s, and continued to contribute occasional bass until they split in 1998. Together with Ian Scouser and Tremendous Mike, he then founded Must Destroy Records after several years working for Alan McGee's Poptones record label.
