= The Jasmine Minks =

British indie pop band

Jasmine Minks
- Origin: Aberdeen, Scotland
- Genre: Indie pop
- Years active: 1983–present
- Labels: Creation, Poptones, Esurient Communications, Bus Stop, Genius Move, Oatcake

The Jasmine Minks are a British indie pop band, whose early singles were amongst the first releases by Creation Records.

== History ==
Formed in Aberdeen in 1983, the band were initially a quartet of Jim Shepherd (guitar/vocals), Adam Sanderson (vocals/guitar), Martin Keena (bass guitar), and Tom Reid (drums/vocals). After sending a demo tape to Melody Maker, the band were recruited by Alan McGee to record for the fledgling Creation label. Their first single, "Think!" was recorded for £50 at Alaska Studios, Waterloo. The 4-piece line-up was augmented by keyboards from Dave Musker, and the single produced by Joe Foster. The small brown plastic electronic organ was the same one that had previously been used on "Blue Boy" by Orange Juice. Prior to recording, Sanderson had been listening to the Buzzcocks' Spiral Scratch EP, and repeated the two note refrain from "Boredom" at the end of "Think!". "Think!"/"Work For Nothing" was released in March 1984, and reached single of the week status, jointly with The Pastels single that Alan McGee released at the same time.

The band recorded and released their second single, "Where the Traffic Goes"/"Mr Magic", once again at Alaska for a similar budget, with Foster producing again. McGee had the idea to promote "Where The Traffic Goes" by doing a one-day busking tour, an idea which he may have "borrowed" from the Violent Femmes, an American band the Jasmine Minks had supported. They played eight gigs in one day, all on acoustic instruments, were moved on by the police, were invited into pubs, and then went to McGees's club, the Living Room to perform that night's gig. By then bored with the acoustics, the band played an all-electric set, amps cranked up to the max, with a 1-2-3-4 between each song, Ramones-style. The press were there, and the energy surprised them. They received outstanding reviews, and were chosen by the NME as one of the eighteen most hopeful bands in Britain and were invited to play at the NME showcase along with Lloyd Cole, The Triffids, The Go-Betweens, The Pogues and others. Jasmine Minks records were played on national radio, and the band began to attract a good reputation as a live act. McGee gave them over £400 to record a six track mini-album, One Two Three Four Five Six Seven, All Good Preachers Go To Heaven (1984, Creation) and some major labels showed an interest in the band, to the extent of booking them sessions in very expensive studios.

Unfortunately, the NME showcase happened during the National Union of Journalists strike, the music press was heavily involved, and the NME was not printed; In short, there was no publicity for the music event of the year, and the band played to a very sparse audience. The expected boost in the band's popularity didn't happen.

As McGee noted in his autobiography:

We [i.e., Creation Records ] did twelve singles before I found the Jesus and Mary Chain and we had our first hit. The Pastels, the Jasmine Minks, Revolving Paint Dream and the Loft all followed. Of these, I thought the Jasmine Minks had the best chance of making it. They were the first band we took seriously in that respect. They were from Aberdeen. It was fronted by Jim Shepherd and Adam Sanderson and they both wrote songs. There aren’t many bigger characters in the history of the label than Hans Christian Sanderson, as we called him: he was an incredible teller of tall tales. They were all great people. We released their records till 1989. Majors were sniffing around them but it came to nothing. They should have made it, and maybe they did make it, maybe making it is the joy in making the records you wanted to make and getting to tour them around Britain and Europe. They seemed happy with that — they weren’t desperate to be pop stars. They had a punk ethos in that respect. Hans Christian ended up coming to work for Creation, answering the phones for a year, in the days of Hackney madness.

At the end of 1984 the band toured mainland Europe as part of a Creation package including McGee's band Biff Bang Pow! and new Creation signings The Jesus and Mary Chain. The JAMC single "Upside Down" was released while the tour was in progress. When the tour was over, McGee found himself increasingly preoccupied with the rising success of the Jesus and Mary Chain. During this period, the Jasmine Minks recorded a four-track EP, inspired by listening to the Buzzcocks "Time's Up" bootleg over and over. It sat on a shelf while McGee was forced to pursue other interests, eventually surfacing as a seven-inch single of "What’s Happening"/"Black & Blue", which was largely ignored by the music press.

Their self-titled debut album was recorded in Ellon, Aberdeenshire, on a budget of £600 and released in 1986. The idea had been to record a low budget, high quality song based album, but McGee did not like the finished result and dropped some tracks. Some earlier recordings were used for the album, including the track "Cold Heart", which had originally been recorded during the One Two Three Four Five Six Seven, All Good Preachers Go To Heaven sessions. In 1986 the band recorded their only Peel session. "Cold Heart" was released as a single in 7" and 12" formats and was NME’s single of the week. It was the Jasmine Minks' biggest-selling single. At this point Sanderson left the band.

Shepherd became the lead vocalist and was joined by keyboardist Paul Cooper. Dave Arnold from Kent band The Claim filled in the guitar spot for the Another Age album (1988) and subsequent gigs, with Ed De Vlam performing guitar duties on Scratch the Surface (1989). A permanent guitarist was later found in Walter Duncan from the band's hometown of Aberdeen.

Despite the albums Another Age and Scratch the Surface drawing critical acclaim the band ceased activity for a few years. They reunited in 2000, releasing the album Veritas, before the band signed to McGee's Poptones label for the release of Popartglory (2001). The Popartglory album track "Daddy Dog", featuring Scottish Socialist politician Tommy Sheridan as vocalist, was released as the only Jasmine Minks single on the Poptones label.

In 2010 a four-track EP, "Poppy White", was released on the Oatcake Records label.

The band played a show in London's Borderline venue on 23 July 2011 – their first live gig in London for ten years – and a second at the Lexington on 25 July 2011, both featuring the early lineup of Shepherd, Sanderson, Keena, Reid and Musker, together with David Arnold. They also appeared at the 2012 Indiefest in the original 1984 lineup.

In 2017 The Jasmine Minks started playing live and recording again. Since then they have played regular live concerts and released two 7" singles. Their BBC Radio 1 sessions from 1986 for John Peel and Janice Long have been released in 2021 as double 7" singles on the new reissue label Precious Recordings of London.

In March 2023, the Jasmine Minks announced the release of a forthcoming album, titled "We Make Our Own History". Their first new album for 22 years, it was released on 12 November 2023.

== Discography ==
=== Singles ===
- "Think!" (1984), Creation
- "Where the Traffic Goes" (1984), Creation
- "What's Happening" (1985), Creation – UK Indie #27
- "Cold Heart" (1986), Creation – UK Indie #17
- Pure EP (1987), Esurient Communications
- "Daddy Dog" (2001), Poptones – Jasmine Minks featuring Tommy Sheridan
- "I Heard 'I Wish It Would Rain'" (2003), Bus Stop Records
- "Poppy White" EP (2010) Oatcake
- "Ten Thousand Tears" (2017) Oatcake
- "Step by Step" (2019) A Turntable Friend
- "John Peel Session 17.02.86" EP (2021) Precious
- "Janice Long Session 24.11.86" EP (2021) Precious

=== Albums ===
- One Two Three Four Five Six Seven, All Good Preachers Go to Heaven (1984), Creation
- The Jasmine Minks (1986), Creation
- Another Age (1988), Creation
- Scratch the Surface (1989), Creation
- Veritas (2000), Genius Move
- Popartglory (2001), Poptones
- We Make Our Own History (2023), Last Night from Glasgow & Spinout Nuggets

=== Compilations ===
- Sunset (1986), Creation
- Soul Station (1991), Creation
- Different for Domeheads (1995), Creation
- The Revenge of Jasmine Minks: Best of the Creation Years (2004), Rev-Ola
- Cut Me Deep – The Anthology 1984 – 2014 (2014), Cherry Red
