= 18 Wheeler =

An 18 wheeler or semi-trailer truck is the combination of a tractor unit and one or more semi-trailers to carry freight.

18 Wheeler may also refer to:

- 18 Wheeler (band), a Scottish indie band
- 18 Wheeler: American Pro Trucker, a 2000 video game
- "18 Wheeler", a song by Pink from Missundaztood
- Boeing 747, as its landing gear has 18 wheels
- "Roll On (Eighteen Wheeler)", a 1984 song by American country band Alabama
