= Slaughter Joe =

English musician and record producer

Joe Foster
- Also known as: Slaughter Joe
- Born: Joseph James Foster Ruiz; 9 August 1960 (age 65); Bloomsbury, London, England
- Occupations: Musician, record producer, record label owner
- Instruments: Vocals, multi-instrumentalist
- Years active: 1977–present
- Labels: Creation Records, Rev-Ola, Kaleidoscope Sound, PoppyDisc

Joe Foster (born Joseph James Foster Ruiz, 9 August 1960, often known as Slaughter Joe) is an English musician and record producer, who, with Alan McGee and Dick Green, formed Creation Records in 1983.

Foster formed the Kaleidoscope Sound label in the mid-1980s, and Creation's subsidiary label Rev-Ola Records in the early 1990s. McGee, Foster and Green were also in the band Biff Bang Pow! He is a former member of the post-punk band Television Personalities.

== Career ==
Along with school friends at the London Oratory School Edward Ball, Dan Treacy, and John and Gerard Bennett, Foster was a member of The Television Personalities. He went on to play in Biff Bang Pow!

He had two UK Independent Chart hits in the mid-1980s with "I'll Follow You Down" (no. 11, 1985) and "She's So Out of Touch" (no. 22, 1986).

As Slaughter Joe and the Modern Folk Quintet, he released All Around My Hobby Horse's Head in 1986 on Kaleidoscope Sound. 1990 saw the release Pied Piper of Feedback on Creation Records. In 2003, he put out Zé Do Caixão which is a compilation of his past work on Rev-Ola featuring Dave Musker (ex-Television Personalities and The Jasmine Minks), Tony Barber (ex-Buzzcocks) and Francis Sweeney (from The June Brides).

=== Production work ===
Foster is noted for producing The Jesus and Mary Chain, Primal Scream, and My Bloody Valentine. He also produced records for many others, including the X-Men, The Jasmine Minks, The Loft, Felt, The Sea Urchins, The Bounty Hunters, Dave Kusworth, 18 Wheeler, Razorcuts, I, Ludicrous, Captain Soul, The Creation and Redlizzard.

=== Rev-Ola Records ===
Foster formed Rev-Ola Records, which primarily re-issues cult records by the likes of Fred Neil and Yma Sumac. He continues to run the label, which is currently a part of the PoppyDisc group. He has recently worked with and has released records by Eugene Kelly, BMX Bandits, Norman Blake, The Fine Arts Showcase, Zoe, Control Freak, The Cake, Roger Nichols & The Small Circle of Friends, Evie Sands, The Wondermints, The Ecstasy of St. Theresa, The Telescopes and The Brian Jonestown Massacre and Richard Olsen.

=== PoppyDisc Records ===
Foster's latest venture is the Glasgow-based PoppyDisc label, with artists including The BMX Bandits, St. Deluxe, Eugene Kelly, Jowe Head, Sean Jackson, and Norman Blake. In addition, RevOla is now a subsidiary of PoppyDisc.

=== Sterling Songs ===
Foster also runs the music publishing house Sterling Songs. Among its roster are Dead Skeletons, Helicon, Thomas And Richard Frost, FJ McMahon, Michaelangelo, and Sheer Taft.

== Sources ==
- Cavanagh, David (2000). The Creation Records Story: My Magpie Eyes Are Hungry for the Prize. London: Virgin Books. ISBN 0-7535-0645-9.
