= Love Is Forever =

Love Is Forever may refer to:

- Love Is Forever (1982 film), a TV movie starring Michael Landon
- Love Is Forever (1954 film), a West German drama film
- "Love Is Forever" (Billy Ocean song), 1986
- "Love Is Forever" (Leonora song), 2019 song that represented Denmark in the Eurovision Song Contest 2019
- "Love Is Forever" (Tomoko Kawase song), 2003
- "Neutron Star Collision (Love Is Forever)", a 2010 song by Muse
- "Love Is Forever", a 1995 Italian Eurodance song by Bliss Team
- Love Is Forever (Cliff Richard album), 1965
- Love Is Forever (Biff Bang Pow! album), 1988
