= My Beauty =

Studio album by Kevin Rowland
- Released: 21 September 1999
- Genre: Rock
- Label: Creation
- Producer: Kevin Rowland, Pete Schwier, Jim Paterson

Kevin Rowland chronology
The Wanderer (1988)	My Beauty (1999)

Professional ratings
Review scores
Source	Rating
Allmusic	4/5 stars
NME	6/10 stars

My Beauty is a solo album by Kevin Rowland, lead singer of Dexys Midnight Runners. It was first released in 1999, eleven years after his solo debut The Wanderer. In the interim, he had experienced problems with drug addiction. My Beauty is an album of cover songs, although Rowland rewrote several of the lyrics to reflect his battles against substance abuse. The album is notorious for its cover, which shows Rowland in drag and make-up, an image which Rowland also used during contemporaneous appearances at the Glastonbury and Reading festivals. During his appearance at Reading, he was pelted with bottles thrown by the audience.

The album was intended to have 12 tracks, and the promo CD distributed (to radio/press) before the official album had all twelve. However, the song "Thunder Road" (written by Bruce Springsteen) was pulled from the album at the last minute because Springsteen had not approved the lyrical changes made by Rowland. It is reinstated on the 2020 release.

The album was released on Creation Records, on the initiative of label boss Alan McGee, who was a fan of Rowland's work. Upon release, the CD-only album received mixed reviews. It has been reported that the album was one of Creation's lowest-selling albums, shifting only 700 copies in the UK, but the album actually sold over 20,000 worldwide. McGee referred to it as "My final, glorious failure at Creation…the one I'm most proud of."

In September 2020, Cherry Red Records re-issued the album, which finally became a UK chart hit, peaking at number 73 in the albums chart.

== Track listing ==
1. "Greatest Love of All" (Linda Creed, Michael Masser)
2. "Rag Doll" (Bob Crewe, Bob Gaudio)
3. "Concrete and Clay" (Tommy Moeller, Gregg Parker)
4. "Daydream Believer" (John Stewart)
5. "This Guy's in Love with You" (Burt Bacharach, Hal David)
6. "The Long and Winding Road" (Lennon–McCartney)
7. "It's Getting Better" (Barry Mann, Cynthia Weil)
8. "I Can't Tell the Bottom from the Top" (Guy Fletcher, Doug Flett)
9. "Labelled with Love (I'll Stay With My Dreams)" (Chris Difford, Glenn Tilbrook)
10. "Reflections of My Life" (Junior Campbell, Thomas McAleese)
11. "You'll Never Walk Alone" (Oscar Hammerstein, Richard Rodgers)

2020 Remastered Edition

The remastered edition (CD and vinyl) reinstates "Thunder Road" as Track 11, and adds instrumental versions of "Concrete and Clay" and "I Can't Tell the Bottom from the Top" as Bonus Tracks (13 and 14). A new video, for the track "Rag Doll" was also produced featuring Rowland's grandson, Roo, to accompany the re-release.
