= The Revolving Paint Dream =

- Origin: London, England
- Genres: Indie pop, neo-psychedelia
- Years active: 1983–1989
- Labels: Creation Records
- Past members: Andrew Innes; Christine Wanless; Alan McGee; Ken Popple; Luke Hayes; Frank Sweeney

The Revolving Paint Dream were a London-based indie band who released two albums and two singles on Creation Records between 1984 and 1989.

== History ==
The band was formed in London in 1983 by Andrew Innes, who had previously played guitar for Alan McGee's band The Laughing Apple, and also contributed to McGee's later band, Biff Bang Pow!. The band also featured Innes's girlfriend Christine Wanless on vocals, Ken Popple (also of Biff Bang Pow!) on drums, and part-time contributions on guitar from McGee himself. The band's debut single, the psychedelic "Flowers are in the Sky"/"In the Afternoon", was released in early 1984, the second single on Creation Records. Three years passed before the band's next release, the mini-LP Off to Heaven, with Innes now a member of Primal Scream and Wanless now working as a press officer for Creation. The band returned in 1989 with a new drummer, Luke Hayes, and a first full-length album, the experimental Mother Watch Me Burn. The band's final release, the "Sun, Sea, Sand" single, was issued the same year.

A compilation of the band's work was released on the Rev-Ola label – Flowers in the Sky: The Enigma of the Revolving Paint Dream.

== Discography ==
=== Albums ===
- Off to Heaven (1987) Creation, CRELP018
- Mother Watch Me Burn (1989) Creation, CRELP039
- Flowers in the Sky: The Enigma of the Revolving Paint Dream (2006) Rev-Ola, CRREV184

=== Singles ===
- "Flowers in the Sky" (1984) Creation, CRE002 (UK Indie #27)
- "Sun, Sea, Sand" (1989) Creation, CRE062
