= Thee Unstrung =

Thee Unstrung were an English group, signed to Mercury Records (originally signed to Alan McGee's record label Poptones. Thee Unstrung released an album in 2005 entitled Lie, Cheat and Steal.

Thee Unstrung was made up of Ben Bailey (lead guitar), Steve Holbrook (rhythm guitar, vocals), Rob Power/Bobby Cooper (bass guitar) and Ben Tweedy (drums). They toured extensively in 2005. Over the 10 years the band were together many members came and went, although Bailey was the founder of the group. He went on to form a new band, His Lost Boys. Holbrook, Power and Tweedy went on to form 1984, joined by lead guitarist Gareth Sutherland and were featured on a Japanese compilation album, Sound of an Era II.

== Singles ==
- "Contrary Mary" (2004) – No. 59 UK
- "Psycho" (2005) – No. 41 UK

== Albums ==
- Lie, Cheat and Steal (2005)

== EPs ==
- "Who Runs The Show"
