= Pass the Paintbrush, Honey.... =

Studio album by Biff Bang Pow!
- Released: 1985
- Genre: Indie pop
- Label: Creation Records
- Producer: Joseph Foster

Biff Bang Pow! chronology
Pass the Paintbrush, Honey.... (1985)	The Girl Who Runs the Beat Hotel (1987)

Pass the Paintbrush, Honey.... is the debut album by English indie pop band Biff Bang Pow!, released in 1985.

== Track listing ==
Side A

1. "There Must Be a Better Life" - (03:14)
2. "Lost Your Dreams" - (02:00)
3. "Love and Hate" - (03:28)
4. "The Chocolate Elephant Man" - (03:08)

Side B

1. "Waterbomb!" - (02:02)
2. "Colin Dobbins" - (02:45)
3. "Wouldn't You" - (02:28)
4. "A Day Out with Jeremy Chester" - (04:05)
