= The Diggers (band) =

Scottish post-Britpop powerpop band

- The Diggers. From left: Alan, Chris, Hank, John

Background information
- Origin: Glasgow, Scotland
- Genres: power pop; post-britpop; indie pop; jangle pop
- Years active: 1993–1997
- Label: Creation
- Members: Alan Moffat; Chris Miezitis; John Eslick; Hank Ross

The Diggers (sometimes stylised as “The Digger$”) were a Scottish Post-Britpop Powerpop band formed in Glasgow in 1993. The group was founded and led by vocalist and bassist Alan Moffat and co-vocalist and guitarist Chris Miezitis. The group's lineup consisted of Alan Moffat (vocals, bass), Chris Miezitis (vocals, guitar) John Eslick (guitar) and Hank Ross (drums).

== History ==
=== Formation ===
The Diggers emerged out of the Glasgow music scene in the 1990s. The band originated from the longtime friendship of band members Chris Miezitis and Alan Moffat, who both attended school together in Methil, Fife. The pair met through playing in different bands at a lunchtime concert in Spring 1989. Moffat remembers Miezitis showing off playing ‘Norwegian Wood’ by The Beatles at said lunchtime concert, and later being at his house listening to his father's Beatles and Wings records. In the two years that followed, the two played in many different lineups, but they kept in touch with each other. By 1992, they were sharing a flat in Glasgow together, and by the start of 1993 they were performing their first shows as an acoustic duo. In the summer of 1993 they recruited members John Eslick and Hank Ross, and over the next year became a fully fledged band naming themselves "The Diggers".

The name "The Diggers" was inspired by the novel "Ringolevio" by Emmett Grogan, the founder of the radical community-action activist group "The Diggers" in San Francisco.

The Diggers performed their first gig at 13th Note in Glasgow, more shows followed and demos of songs were recorded, though challenges were faced while The Diggers were evolving. Moffat was thrown out of art school, and Eslick was involved in a car crash with a herd of cows on the M8. This put Eslick in a coma for three weeks, and it took him months to recover and to be able to perform again. This stalled the band's progress for around 6 months.

=== Record Deal and Release ===
The Diggers caught the attention of Martin Carr from The Boo Radleys, and Carr helped them secure a recording contract with Creation Records. Their first appearance was on a one-off promotional split 7" single with The Boo Radleys for NME Limbo Lounge in 1994. The Boo Radleys were on the A-side with "I Want A Rainbow Nation" and The Diggers on the B-Side with an early version of their song "Passport To Rec".

The Diggers officially signed to Creation in early 1996, and blew their £60,000 advance in just a few months on partying, drinking, drugs, and “Fast cars and fast women.”

"Cars, women, drink, drugs all the usual rock 'n' roll stuff. If it was expensive we bought it.

Sixty grand blown in a few months. We're broke now and didn't even have enough to get the bus to the airport when we had to go to England to film the new video.

I'm living off beans until our next advance. I think we'll get it when we have our first number one single so it shouldn't be too long now.”

— Chris Miezitis

The band began recording their debut album Mount Everest at Greenhouse and Stoneroom Studios in London from March to May 1996. The production was handled by Charlie Francis, known for his work with The High Llamas.

Their first output on the label arrived in August 1996 with the single "Peace of Mind", a three-track CD release featuring the titular lead single alongside two B-sides: "Tangled Web" and "Get It Together". The tracks were an early showcase of the band's musical sense. The title track "Peace of Mind" would later appear on their debut album.

This was swiftly followed by their second release, which came in October of the same year. A three-track CD single "Nobody's Fool" with the B-sides "Life's All Ways" and "Here and There". A music video was also filmed for the title track. "Nobody's Fool" later appeared on the band's debut album, and the song became a standout track for the band.

To promote these releases, The Diggers embarked on multiple tours, opening for bands such as Super Furry Animals, Ben Folds Five, and Heavy Stereo.

Their third release came in February of 1997, the three-track CD single "O.K. Alright", with the B-sides "On the Line" and "Holiday Inn". The title track would also appear on the band's debut album and get a music video featuring Jim Carter. "O.K. Alright" went on to become one of the most popular songs by The Diggers.

When reflecting on the band's identity and musical direction during this period, Alan Moffat said:

"At the end of the day you live and die by the music that you make - which is what you want people to get interested in, not you, yourself. We're not into the cult of the personality stuff, or paying homage to the past ... we're striving towards being a truly original pop band - Take That with guitars!"

=== Mount Everest Release & Reception ===
On 7 March 1997, The Diggers released their debut album and their only album, Mount Everest on Creation Records in the UK and Europe, followed by a US licensing deal with Big Deal Records in 1998.

The album received mixed reception from music critics upon its release. Writing for AllMusic, critic Stephen Thomas Erlewine awarded the album 2.5 out of 5 stars, praising opening tracks like "Circles" for their soft, melodic charm. Erlewine argued that the record ultimately suffered from a lack of energy and momentum, writing that "by the end of the record, the qualities that seemed charming at the beginning... have become tedious".

Indie rock collectors often view the album more favourably, noting its melodic jangle-pop sensibilities and harmonies reminiscent of the Beach Boys, though acknowledging that their arrival toward the tail end of the Britpop era limited its commercial reach.

Overall, Mount Everest achieved modest sales and failed to chart prominently, leading to the album remaining the band's sole full-length release before their disbandment.

The name "Mount Everest" came from the fact that The Beatles album Abbey Road was originally going to be called Everest. According to Miezitis:

I'd read that Paul McCartney nicknamed Abbey Road "Everest." I thought the name sounded good. So we called our album Mount Everest. We were very ambitious at the time and thought we were geniuses and would be very successful. The name reflects our ambition at the time. It has to be said that it was the biggest thing we'd done for our ages.

=== Disbandment ===
The Diggers likely broke up sometime between late 1997 and early 1998, shortly after beginning work on demo recordings for a proposed second album. Their dissolution was primarily driven by unhelpful industry advice, and their debut release failing to achieve a mainstream breakthrough.

We received a lot of bad advice from older people. In fact, some tried to rip us off. The band didn't survive. That's just how it is. We were recording demos for the second album when we broke up. I didn't touch my guitar for three years after that, and I drank for a few years.

— Chris Miezitis

The band's members have all pursued quieter paths in their lives after the breakup. Moffat has remained semi-active in music, though he has stepped away from major public releases. Miezitis took an extended hiatus from music, ceasing to play guitar for three years and dealt with alcohol issues before eventually returning as a member of the Fife-based sextet 'AMBULANCES' up until 2017. Both Eslick and Ross have largely retired from the recording industry, leaving no prominent footprint in the local music scene.

== Discography ==
- Mount Everest (Creation Records, 1997, Big Deal Music, 1998)
- I Want A Rainbow Nation / Passport To Rec. (Split 7” single with The Boo Radleys) (Creation Records, 1994)
- The Diggers (Cassette, Self titled E.P.) Includes “East Coast”, “I Found Something” and “Weird and Wonderful” (Self-Released, 1994)
- Nobody's Fool (Three-track CD). Includes "Nobody's Fool", "Life's All Ways" and "Here and There" (Creation Records, 1996)
- Peace of Mind (Three-track CD). Includes "Peace of Mind", "Tangled Web" and "Get It Together" (Creation Records, 1996)
- O.K. Alright (Three-track CD). Includes "O.K. Alright", "On the Line" and "Holiday Inn" (Creation Records, 1997)
