= Rev-Ola Records =

British independent record label

- Parent company: PoppyDisc
- Founded: 1990
- Founder: Joe Foster
- Distributor: PoppyDisc/Shellshock/Virtual (US)
- Genre: Esoterica, pop
- Country of origin: UK United States
- Location: Glasgow, Scotland

Rev-Ola Records is a British independent record label formed in 1990 that specializes in reissues, as well as select new releases. The label is headed by Joe Foster, a former child actor and musician/producer. He, along with Alan McGee and Dick Green, formed Creation Records, as well as the band Biff Bang Pow!.

== History ==
The inspiration for Rev-Ola came from the Creation Records staff's love of finding or compiling old, rare, and bizarre records.

The label was originally a subsidiary of the Creation Records publishing arm, Creation Songs, in which guise it also issued spoken word recordings by William Shatner and Ivor Cutler, as well as first-time reissues by favoured artists, such as Fred Neil and Yma Sumac.

Other executives at Rev-Ola include art director and songwriter Andy Morten, and mastering engineer Norman Blake (of Teenage Fanclub).

After Creation Records shut shop in 1999 Rev-Ola became an imprint of the Glasgow-based PoppyDisc label, founded by Foster with Paul Cardow.

== Select list of artists on Rev-Ola ==
- Evie Sands
- Astrud Gilberto
- BMX Bandits
- Cassius Clay
- The Carnival
- The Clique
- Clyde McPhatter
- The Cake
- Patti Dahlstrom
- Dana Gillespie
- Dave Mason
- Deep Six
- Doc Pomus
- Eartha Kitt
- Eric Burdon
- Fats Domino
- F.J. McMahon
- The 5th Dimension
- Fred Neil
- Gene Vincent
- The Hard Times
- Honeybus
- HP Lovecraft
- Ivor Cutler
- Jackie Brenston
- Joe Meek
- Johnny Otis
- July
- Kathe Green
- Last Poets
- Laura Nyro
- Lead Belly
- Link Davis
- Lulu
- Marianne Faithfull
- Mario Telles
- Mars Bonfire
- Merrilee Rush
- Michaelangelo
- The Millennium
- Peanut Butter Conspiracy
- Peggy Lee
- Pete Astor
- Q65
- Revolving Paint Dream
- Screaming Jay Hawkins
- The Scruffs
- Slaughter Joe
- Solomon Burke
- Thanes
- Them
- The Treniers
- Tymon Dogg
- Vivian Stanshall
- Weather Prophets
- The Weavers
- William Shatner
- Yma Sumac
- The Grass Roots
