= The Girl Who Runs the Beat Hotel =

Studio album by Biff Bang Pow!
- Released: 1987
- Genre: Indie pop
- Label: Creation Records
- Producer: Joseph Foster, Biff Bang Pow!

Biff Bang Pow! chronology
Pass the Paintbrush, Honey.... (1985)	The Girl Who Runs the Beat Hotel (1987)	Oblivion (1987)

The Girl Who Runs the Beat Hotel is the second album by English indie pop band Biff Bang Pow!, released in 1987.

== Track listing ==
Side A

1. "Someone Stole My Wheels" – 02:45
2. "Love's Going Out of Fashion" – 03:16
3. "She Never Understood" – 03:13
4. "He Don't Need That Girl" – 02:06
5. "She Shivers Inside" – 03:21

Side B

1. "The Beat Hotel" – 02:17
2. "The Happiest Girl in the World" – 03:23
3. "If I Die" – 02:35
4. "Five Minutes in the Life of Greenwood Goulding" – 04:23
5. "The Whole World Is Turning Brouchard!" – 01:29
