= Arnold (band) =

English indie band

- Origin: London, England
- Genres: Alternative rock
- Years active: 1996–early 2000s
- Labels: Creation, Poptones
- Past members: Phil Morris; Mark Saxby; Phil Payne; Rob Arriss; Dave Hill

Arnold were an English three piece alternative rock band from London, England, formed in 1996, who released two albums on Creation Records.

== History ==
The band comprised Phil Morris (lead vocals, drums), Mark Saxby (guitar, vocals) and Phil Payne (bass, vocals) and played guitar-based music influenced by Big Star, Crosby, Stills, Nash and Young and The Who. Originally members of the band Patio, they became Arnold after the former band's singer died, the new band named after Payne's dog.

They signed for Alan McGee's Creation Records in 1997, at a time when the label was riding high on the Britpop-fuelled success of Oasis, and stayed until the label's demise in 1999, releasing two albums, the first (The Barn Tapes) originally recorded in a barn in Kent as demos for the label, and the second (Hillside) much lauded by critics. Hillside Album was released on 13 July 1998. They toured the United States in 1998 before returning to the UK to tour with Neil Finn followed by dates supporting Bernard Butler. They subsequently signed for McGee's next label, Poptones and were joined by Rob Arriss (guitar and keyboards) and Dave Hill (drums) before releasing the album Bahama in 2001.

"Tiny Car", from Bahama, was usd in the soundtrack of the 2001 film When Brendan Met Trudy.

Saxby and Payne have also formed a side-project called Little Massive with Rob Arriss, whose album Dog Gone was released in 2005.

== Discography ==
=== Albums ===
- The Barn Tapes (1997), Creation
- Hillside Album (1998), Creation/Sony BMG
- Bahama (2001), Poptones - reissued in 2008 with additional tracks from B-sides on Luckie Pierre Recordings

=== Singles ===
- "Twist" (1997), Creation
- "Fleas Don't Fly" (1998), Creation
- "Fishsounds" (1998), Creation
- "Windsor Park" (1998), Creation
- "Wild Colonial Girl" (2002), Luckie Pierre Recordings

=== EPs ===
- Christmassy Special (1997), Creation - free giveaway
- Arnold (2002), Luckie Pierre Recordings
