= Technique (band) =

British synthpop band

- Genres: Synthpop
- Years active: Mid-1990s
- Label: Creation Records
- Past members: Kate Holmes; Xan Tyler

Technique were a British synthpop band from the mid-1990s featuring Kate Holmes of Frazier Chorus and singer Xan Tyler. The band was named after New Order's 1989 album of the same name, and they were signed to Creation Records, the record label owned by Holmes's husband, Alan McGee.

== Formation ==
Holmes and Tyler met at Butterfly, the studio owned by legendary producer and former Killing Joke member Youth, where Tyler was working as a session backing vocalist. They began work on the group's debut album, with synthpop veteran Stephen Hague and Oasis producer Owen Morris handling production duties alongside Holmes herself. Other notable contributors to the album included Ash frontman Tim Wheeler, vocalist Kirsty Hawkshaw and Youth himself on bass.

== Releases ==
Technique released two singles on Creation in the summer of 1999: "Sun is Shining" and "You & Me". "Sun is Shining" reached No. 64 in the UK Singles Chart in April 1999 and "You & Me" got to No. 56 in August of the same year. The album, by now entitled Pop Philosophy, was promo-ed but never officially saw the light of day after McGee decided to close the label. Technique lay dormant for several years while McGee set up his new venture, Poptones. Holmes and Tyler contributed to Mission Control's Dub Showcase album (produced by Holmes' long-term associate Mad Professor), which featured several unreleased songs from Pop Philosophy.

In 2000, C-pop singer Coco Lee had a huge hit on the Asian market with a cover of Technique's second single, "You and Me". Following this, Poptones released a truncated version of Pop Philosophy in Germany and Asia, featuring seven tracks plus two remixes by Matt Darey. "Sun is Shining" and "You & Me" were also re-released in Germany to capitalise on the new found interest, and the band toured extensively during 2001.

== Disbandment ==
Technique disbanded, and Tyler was unable to take part in a tour supporting Depeche Mode. Kate Holmes replaced her with Sarah Blackwood from Newcastle-upon-Tyne band Dubstar, and shortly thereafter the two decided to collaborate and write material together. The new band, electro-pop band Client, signed a deal with Andy Fletcher's Toast Hawaii record label.
