= Me (Biff Bang Pow! album) =

Studio album by Biff Bang Pow!
- Released: 1991
- Genre: Indie, Indie pop
- Label: Creation Records - CRELP 071
- Producer: Noel Thompson

Biff Bang Pow! chronology
Songs for the Sad Eyed Girl (1990)	Me (1991)

Me is the sixth and last album by London indie pop band Biff Bang Pow! released in 1991.

== Track listing ==
Side A

1. My First Friend - (01:47)
2. Miss You - (04:48)
3. I'm Burned - (03:01)
4. Song For A Nail - (03:00)
5. She Saved Me - (02:10)

Side B

1. You Just Can't Buy Satisfaction - (02:56)
2. Sad Eyes In Velvet - (02:39)
3. Guilt Ridden - (01:30)
4. Lovers - (03:04)
5. Baby You Just Make Me Strong - (04:25)

== Personnel ==
- Robert Young - guitar
- Richard Green - guitar, acoustic guitar
- Edward Ball - organ, vocals
- Ken Popple - percussion, vocals
- Joss Cope - synthesizer
- Paul Mulreany - vocals
- Alan McGee - vocals, acoustic guitar, organ
