= Songs for the Sad Eyed Girl =

Songs For The Sad Eyed Girl

Studio album by Biff Bang Pow!
- Released: 1990
- Genre: Indie, Indie pop
- Label: Creation Records – CRELP 058
- Producer: Ian Shaw, Richard Green

Biff Bang Pow! chronology
Love Is Forever (1988)	Songs For The Sad Eyed Girl (1990)	Me (1991)

Songs For The Sad Eyed Girl is the fifth album by London indie pop band Biff Bang Pow! released in 1990.

== Track listing ==
Side A

1. She Kills Me – (04:42)
2. The Girl From Well Lane – (02:39)
3. Baby, You Just Don't Care – (04:19)
4. If You Don't Love Me Now You Never Ever Will – (02:43)

Side B

1. Someone To Share My Life With – (02:49)
2. Religious – (05:34)
3. Hug Me Honey – (02:54)

== Personnel ==
- Richard Green – electric guitar
- Edward Ball – organ, piano, voice
- Ken Popple – percussion, voice
- Joss Cope – synthesizer
- Alan McGee – voice, acoustic guitar
