= Oblivion (Biff Bang Pow! album) =

Studio album by Biff Bang Pow!
- Released: 1987
- Genre: Indie, Indie pop
- Label: Creation Records - CRELP 020
- Producer: Biff Bang Pow!

Biff Bang Pow! chronology
| The Girl Who Runs the Beat Hotel (1987) | Oblivion (1987) | Love Is Forever (1988) |

Oblivion is the third album by London indie pop band Biff Bang Pow! released in 1987.

== Track listing ==
Side A

1. In A Mourning Town - (02:40)
2. There You Go Again - (02:04)
3. 7 Seconds - (02:51)
4. A Girl Called Destruction - (03:12)
5. She's Got Diamonds In Her Hair - (03:28)

Side B

1. The Only Color In This World Is Love - (02:51)
2. Baby Sister - (02:52)
3. Then When I Scream - (03:19)
4. I See The Sun - (02:52)
5. I'm Still Waiting For My Time - (03:54)

== Personnel ==
- Dave Evans - bass
- Ken Popple - drums
- Richard Green - guitar
- Andrew Innes - organ, guitar
- Alan McGee - vocals, guitar
