= Idha =

Swedish retired singer-songwriter (born 1972)

- Born: Idha Övelius; 22 May 1972 (age 53); Södertälje, Sweden
- Occupations: Structural engineer, former musician
- Spouse: Andy Bell (formerly)
- Children: 2
- Musical career
- Genres: Indie pop, folk rock
- Instruments: Vocals, guitar
- Years active: 1994–2000
- Label: Creation

Idha Anna Maria Övelius (born 22 May 1972, Södertälje, Sweden), known professionally as Idha, is a Swedish former singer/songwriter. She released two albums in the 1990s on Creation Records: Melody Inn and Troublemaker.

Idha was married to guitarist Andy Bell, co-founder of Ride and bassist with Oasis, as well as co-founder of Beady Eye, with whom she had two children, a daughter named Leia and a son named Leon. Bell co-wrote some of the songs on her debut album, Melody Inn, while former Small Faces member Ian McLagan contributed keyboards to the album. Her 1994 EP A Woman in a Man's World featured guest appearances from both Evan Dando and Stephen Duffy.

After a quiet couple of years, Idha returned in 1997 with her second album Troublemaker, again featuring Bell, alongside Tony Barber (of Buzzcocks) and Alan White. While her first album largely consisted of country-tinged, acoustic folk-rock, the second had a much fuller sound with the addition of horns and strings.

Idha lives in Stockholm, Sweden with her two children. She retired from the music industry in 2000. Since 2009, she has been working as a structural engineer at the Stockholm-based firm Hidemark & Stintzing Architects.

== Discography ==
=== Albums ===
- Melody Inn (1994) Creation
- Troublemaker (1997) Creation

=== Singles ===
- "Get Undressed" (1994) Creation
- A Woman in a Man's World EP (1994) Creation
- "Sorry Sorry" (1997) Creation
- "Going Down South" (1997) Creation
- "Sweet September Rain" (1997) Creation
