= The Foxes (band) =

English indie rock band

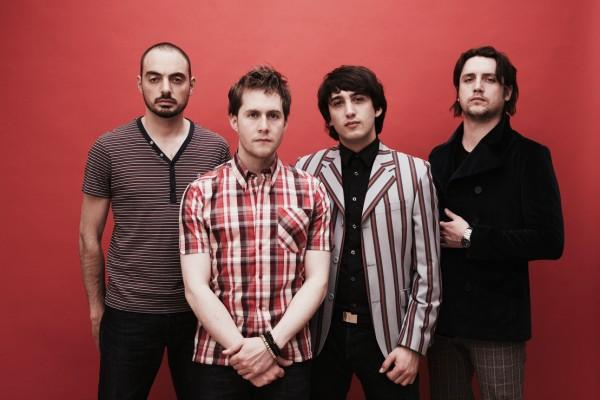
- Left to right: Stephen Wilde, Nigel Thomas, Jonathan Bretman and Alex Douglas.

Background information
- Origin: London, England
- Genres: Indie rock, post-punk revival
- Years active: 2006–present
- Labels: Room 10 Records
- Members: Nigel Thomas; Jonathan Bretman; Alex Douglas; Stephen Wilde
- Website: www.thefoxesband.co.uk

The Foxes are an English indie rock band formed in 2006. They have entered the UK Indie Singles Chart twice and have been mentioned in the NME magazine. The band released their début album "Last Of Many" in 2011 which was recorded at the Sawmills Studios in Cornwall, produced and mixed by John Cornfield.

== History ==
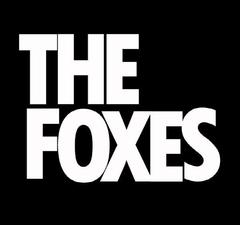
The Foxes Logo

In the summer of 2006 Nigel Thomas, at the time a mental health professional, and Alex Douglas formed the acoustic duo 'Rush Hour Soul' in London. With the addition of two band members and a name change to "The Foxes" the current line-up was formed: Thomas (lead vocals, rhythm guitar), Jonathan Bretman (lead guitar), Douglas (bass, backing vocals) and Stephen Wilde (drums). Thomas writes the music and lyrics.

The Foxes critically acclaimed début EP 'Lover, Killer' was released in August 2007 and sold in CD format, limited to 500 hand numbered copies.

In 2008, the band formed their own record label 'Room 10 Records'. The name originates from the room the band used for rehearsal at Survival Studios in North London.

The first release on the new label was the début Single 'Trauma Town' on 20 October 2008, which was sold in limited edition vinyl format and digital download, reaching number 9 on the official UK Indie charts according to the BBC website.

On 16 March 2009 the single 'Bill Hicks' (based on famous comedian) was released on CD, vinyl and digital download, which reached number 6 on the official UK Indie charts according to the BBC website.

On 3 August 2009 they released a new recording of 'Lover, Killer' as a single on CD, vinyl and digital download, along with a video filmed by Nigel Thomas' brother. This release did not chart as sales were not counted for that period.

On 17 May 2010 they released the "Depression, Joy and a Moment of Fame" EP, a precursor to their début album. This release also did not chart as sales were not counted for that period.

The band are no longer together although singer Nigel Thomas continues to release music.

== Present ==
The band have worked with John Cornfield (producer and mixer) at Sawmills Studios in Cornwall on their EP 'Depression, Joy and Moment of Fame'.

Their début album, 'Last of Many' again produced by John Cornfield at Sawmills, was released on 5 December 2011.

== Tours and appearances ==
The Foxes have played in various venues across the country and have toured a number of times across the US and UK. Additionally, They have played in the O2 Arena, supporting The Magic Numbers.

== Discography ==
=== Studio albums ===
Year	Album details	Chart peak positions	Certifications (sales thresholds)	Sales
Year	Album details	UK	Certifications (sales thresholds)	Sales
2011	Last of Many: Released: 5 December 2011; Label: Room 10 Records; Formats: CD, digital download	TBR	TBR	TBR
"—" denotes releases that did not chart or were not released in that country.

=== Extended plays ===
Year	EP details
2007	Lover, Killer: Released: August 2007; Label: Formats: CD
2010	Depression, Joy and a Moment of Fame: Release due: 17 May 2010; Label: Formats: CD, digital download

=== Singles ===
Year	Song	Peak chart positions		Album
Year	Song	UK	UK Indie	Album
2008	"Trauma Town"	—	9	N/A
2009	"Bill Hicks"	—	6	N/A
2009	"Lover, Killer"	—	—	N/A
"—" denotes releases that did not chart or were not released in that country.
