= Tangerine (band) =

American indie pop band

- Origin: Seattle, Washington (state), United States
- Genres: Indie pop, dream pop, indie rock, garage rock revival
- Years active: 2013–present
- Labels: SWOON Records
- Members: Marika Justad; Miro Justad; Toby Kuhn
- Past members: Ryan Baker
- Website: tangerineband.com

Tangerine is an American indie pop band. Originally based in Seattle, the group relocated to Los Angeles in 2017.

== History ==
Sisters Marika and Miro Justad played as a duo called The Neons at the SoundOff battle of bands competition for young people, hosted through the Museum of Pop Culture. Toby Kuhn, who was in the SoundOff audience, partnered with Marika to create a duo, The Sutures; Miro also played with their band after she entered high school. The group split as Kuhn attended, then left, college, while Marika met and performed with Ryan Baker as they both were students at the University of Washington. When The Sutures reunited, Baker joined the lineup, and the band regrouped under the name Tangerine in January 2013.

Over the course of that year, the quartet released their first two EPs, Pale Summer and Radical Blossom. Both EPs received positive buzz from The Guardian, the print edition of NME, and MTV. The band also garnered attention, including "a shout-out from Governor Inslee", for the early single "Hanford Rivera", which addresses toxic waste leakage into the Columbia River from the Hanford Site. Between 2013 and 2014, Tangerine performed at the national level as part of South by Southwest, as well as regional Pacific Northwest festivals like Bumbershoot and the Capitol Hill Block Party.

In 2014, Tangerine's song "The Runner" was featured in two episodes of season 4 of the television comedy Awkward. In October of that year, the band's third EP Behemoth!, its first studio recording, was released. A review in Northwest Asian Weekly favorably compared the "sweet vocals" and "edgy chords" of Behemoth! to The Velvet Underground and Television's Marquee Moon album.

In February 2016, a fourth Tangerine EP, Sugar Teeth, arrived. The EP's first and second tracks, "Tender" and "Sunset", premiered on Noisey and Stereogum, respectively.

In June 2017, the Justad sisters and Kuhn announced a move from Seattle to Los Angeles, aiming to record a debut record as Tangerine and interact with more diverse music audiences. Two months later, the band shared the single "Sly Moon", a track created with help from Michael Shuman of Queens of the Stone Age and Zach Dawes of Mini Mansions. After a fall tour with Bleachers, this was followed by a Billboard-exclusive release of the single "Fever Dream" in November 2017.

In October 2018, Tangerine shared their singles "Local Mall" and "Cherry Red" with accompanying music videos. Marika Justad revealed that the group's EP White Dove, which arrived the same month, would transition from Tangerine's previous rock direction to a more melodic sound with pop elements.

In October 2024, Tangerine independently released their debut full length album, You’re Still The Only One. Atwood magazine called it “seductive and spellbinding”, and they named Tangerine one of LA’s most exciting indie pop outfits.

== Musical style and influences ==
The name "Tangerine" came from the song of the same name on Led Zeppelin's album Led Zeppelin III. The members of Tangerine have described the group's style as "dark pop + rock n roll".

Marika Justad has cited Courtney Love, Mazzy Star, and Karen O as stylistic influences, as well as Lou Reed and The Beach Boys for their ability to maintain "that bittersweet light/dark balancing act" in their songwriting. Miro Justad and Kuhn have claimed inspiration, particularly for beats, from Miriam Makeba, Dave Brubeck, Miles Davis, and Antônio Carlos Jobim.

== Members ==
=== Current members ===
- Marika Justad - vocals, guitar, keyboards
- Miro Justad - drums, vocals
- Toby Kuhn - guitar, vocals

=== Past members ===
- Ryan Baker - bass, vocals

== Discography ==
=== EPs ===
- Pale Summer – digital download (2013)
- Radical Blossom – SWOON Records (USA), digital download (2013)
- Behemoth! – digital download/CD (2014)
- Sugar Teeth – SWOON Records (USA), digital download/CD (2016)
- White Dove – digital download (2018)
