= Love Is Forever (Biff Bang Pow! album) =

Studio album by Biff Bang Pow!
- Released: 1988
- Genre: Indie, Indie pop
- Label: Creation Records - CRELP 029
- Producer: Biff Bang Pow!

Biff Bang Pow! chronology
Oblivion (1987)	Love Is Forever (1988)	Songs for the Sad Eyed Girl (1990)

Love Is Forever is the fourth album by London indie pop band Biff Bang Pow!, released in 1988.

== Track listing ==
Side A

1. Miss California Toothpaste 1972 - (03:39)
2. She Haunts - (02:47)
3. Searching For The Pavement - (02:56)
4. She Paints - (05:21)
5. Close - (03:25)

Side B

1. Ice Cream Machine - (04:06)
2. Electric Sugar Child - (03:28)
3. Dark In Mind - (03:14)
4. Startripper - (02:45)
5. She Went Away To The Love - (01:47)

== Personnel ==
- Edward Ball - backing vocals
- Philip King - bass
- Richard Green - guitar, acoustic guitar
- Andrew Blake - harmonica
- Joss Cope - organ
- Ken Popple - percussion
- Alan McGee - vocals, guitar, acoustic guitar
