= Blow-Up (band) =

British indie pop/indie rock band active between 1986 and 1991

- Origin: Brighton, England
- Genres: Indie pop, indie rock
- Years active: 1986 – 1991
- Labels: Creation; Ediesta; Megadisc; Cherry Red
- Past members: Nick Roughley (vocals); Alan Stirner (guitar) (1986–1988); Trevor Elliott (bass) (1986–1987); Aziz Hashmi (bass) (1987–1989); Chris Window (drums) (1986–1988); Will Taylor (bass) (1989–1991); Justin Spear (guitar) (1988–1991); Paul Reeves (drums) (1988–1991)

Blow-Up were a British indie pop/indie rock band active between 1986 and 1991.

== History ==
The band was formed in Brighton, England in 1986 by former 14 Iced Bears member Nick Roughley (vocals), along with Alan Stirner (guitar), Whirl frontman Trevor Elliott on Bass, and The Milk Sisters drummer Chris Window (drums). Signing to Creation Records at their first gig by an awe-struck Alan McGee they gained exposure with two singles on the label, 1987's "Good for Me" and "Pool Valley" (the latter taking its name from Brighton's bus station and featuring new bassist Aziz Hashmi). A BBC Janice Long live session at the Abbey Road Studios in 1987 brought the outfit well needed publicity with the help of Dave Nimmo on percussion. A tour of the Netherlands and Belgium was followed by their early recordings being collected on the Rollercoaster compilation issued on Megadisc in 1988. After two further EP's, the first album, In Watermelon Sugar, was issued in 1990. This line-up featured Justin Spear, son of Roger Ruskin Spear of the Bonzo Dog Doo-Dah Band and 'Paul' Reeves, who as Billy Reeves formed theaudience with Sophie Ellis-Bextor in 1997. A further album, Amazon Eyegasm (featuring the former 14 Iced Bear Will Taylor on guitar and 'Red Ed' on drums) followed in 1991.

== Discography ==
=== Singles/EPs ===
- "Good for Me" (1987, Creation Records) (UK Indie No. 37)
- "Pool Valley" (1987, Creation Records)
- "Forever Holiday" (1988, Ediesta)
- "Forever Holiday" (1989, Cherry Red)
- "Own World Waiting" (1990, Cherry Red)
- "World" (1991, Cherry Red)

=== Albums ===
- Rollercoaster (1988, Megadisc)
- In Watermelon Sugar (1990, Cherry Red)
- Amazon Eyegasm (1991, Cherry Red)
