= Ultra Living =

Ultra Living is the duo of two Japanese brothers, Takuma and Tetsushi Nonaka. Takuma was formerly the buyer for a classical record store, Tetsushi an avid lover of diverse local musics, and both brothers are multi instrumentalists. Growing up on hip-hop, the two brothers began recording their own version of the music. In 1996, with a backpack of demos and a notebook of label addresses copied from record sleeves, they flew to London. Within two days they were sitting across from Alan McGee, signing to Creation Records. Their first album, Monochromatic Adventure, was released from Creation Records in 1998. Since then they have released four albums. Around the same time as their 2000 album Transgression, Ultra Living also collaborated with the American emcee Mike Ladd on "Preppy MC Death of Hip Hop Vol.1" released on New York's underground hip-hop label Ozone. Ultra Living has done several remix works including The Boo Radleys, Sub Pop act Pigeonhed, Japanese girls duo Puffy AmiYumi, The Cure, and HiM (band)'s single from FatCat Records. They were also members of HiM (band).

== Members ==
- Takuma Nonaka
- Tetsushi Nonaka
- (Kyoko Brown aka Kyoko Mori)

== Discography ==
=== Albums ===
- 1998 Monochromatic Adventure (Creation Records)
- 2000 Transgression (Artefact/France, Afterhours/Japan, Bubblecore/US Distribution) featuring Mice Parade, Mike Ladd, Kyoko Brown
- 2002 Through (Afterhours/Japan, Bubblecore/US Distribution)
- 2007 Zoonomia (P-Vine Records/Japan)

=== Singles ===
- 1997 "Sweetest Pleasure" (Creation Records)
- 1998 "Freeze, Die & Revive" (Creation Records)
- 1998 "Homesick" (Creation Records)
- 2000 "Absurdly Pedantic" (Artefact/France)
- 2001 "Preppy MC Death of Hip Hop Vol.1" (Ozone/US) featuring Mike Ladd

=== Remixes ===
- 1996 "Gone" / The Cure (Elektra Records)
- 1996 "Bullfrog Green" / The Boo Radleys (Creation Records)
- 1998 "It's Like the Man Said" / Pigeonhed (Sub Pop)
- 1998 "Keep on Keepin' On" / Pigeonhed (Sub Pop)
- 1998 "Rev Splash" / Ken Ishii (Sony Records)
- 1999 "PRMX 1" / Puffy AmiYumi (Sony Records)
- 2002 "Sea Level" / HiM (band) (Fat Cat Records)

=== Video games ===
- 2005 Flipnic: Ultimate Pinball (Capcom)
