= 18 Wheeler (band) =

Scottish rock band

18 Wheeler were a Scottish rock band active in the 1990s, consisting of Sean Jackson (vocals, guitar), David Keenan (guitar, vocals), Alan Hake (bass), and Neil Halliday (drums). Original bassist Chris "Pint Glass" Stewart left before any recordings were made, and was replaced by original drummer Hake.

Keenan left in 1994 to start his own group, the Telstar Ponies and was replaced by guitarist Steven Haddow. In the same year, the band released their first album Twin Action on Creation Records on 25 July, and on 22 May 1995 they released their second album, Formanka.

Their third album, Year Zero, which saw them take a more experimental sample-based approach, was released on 10 March 1997. The remixed single "Stay" was given mainstream radio play and gave them their only UK Top 75 hit single (peaking at No. 59 in March). They were subsequently dropped by Creation during the recording of what was to be their fourth studio release. Although Alan Hake has stated that Creation Records allowed the band to keep the master tapes to this album, no plans to officially release it have materialised. Hake went on to co-found the Must Destroy record label.

18 Wheeler were the band Oasis were supporting the night that Oasis were discovered by Creation Records boss Alan McGee at King Tut's Wah Wah Hut in Glasgow on 31 May 1993.

== Line up ==
- Sean Jackson: Guitars, Vocals, Bass and Piano
- Neil Halliday: Percussion, Vocals, Guitars and Synth
- Alan Hake: Bass, Vocals, Guitars and Moog
- Steven Haddow: Guitars, Vocals
- David Keenan: Guitars, Vocals
- Paul Fyfe: Guitars
- Chris Stewart: Bass

== Discography ==
=== Studio albums ===
- Twin Action (1994, CRECD164)
- Formanka (1995, CRECD181 & CRECD181L)
- Year Zero (1997, CRECD192)
- Charmed Life (2006)

=== Singles and EPs ===
- "Nature Girl"
- "Suncrush"
- "Kum Back"
- "The Revealer"
- "Boddha"
- "Steel Guitars"
- "The Hours and the Times"
- "Crabs"
- "Prozac Beats"
- "Stay"
- "Grease"
