= Biff Bang Pow! =

English indie pop band

- Origin: London, England
- Genres: Indie pop
- Years active: 1983–1991
- Label: Creation Records
- Members: Alan McGee; Dick Green; Joe Foster; Ken Popple; Dave Evans; Andrew Innes

Biff Bang Pow! were an indie pop band from London, England, active between 1983 and 1991, centering on Creation Records boss Alan McGee.

== History ==
Glaswegian Alan McGee had previously been in the band The Laughing Apple, who released three singles in 1981/82. After moving to London, McGee formed a new band, Biff Bang Pow!, taking their name from a song by one of his favourite bands, The Creation. The first release on Creation records, "'73 in '83" by The Legend! came with a flexi-disc featuring Laughing Apple's "Wouldn't You", a song that would later appear on the first Biff Bang Pow! album.

The initial Biff Bang Pow! line-up was McGee on guitar and vocals, with Dick Green on guitar, Joe Foster on bass, and Ken Popple on drums, these recording the first 2 singles "50 Years of Fun" and "There Must Be A Better Life".

Dave Evans then replaced Foster (who went solo as Slaughter Joe), and guitarist/organist Andrew Innes (later to join Primal Scream) joined on a part-time basis. Debut album Pass The Paintbrush...Honey was released in early 1985, displaying a mixture of mod, psychedelia, and new wave influences. 1986 saw arguably the band's strongest album The Girl Who Runs The Beat Hotel, which expanded on the first album's psychedelic and sixties pop influences, and featured collaborations with artist/painter JC Brouchard. This album coincided with the peak of the first wave of indie pop and as this gave way to shoegazing and grunge, Creation Records also moved in that direction, with the label increasingly being associated with artists such as My Bloody Valentine and Ride. With Biff Bang Pow!, however, McGee continued with guitar pop, becoming increasingly melancholy with releases such as Oblivion (1987), Love Is Forever (1988), Songs For The Sad Eyed Girl (1990), and Me (1991), which proved to be the last album proper by the band. Two compilations, L'Amour, Demure, Stenhousemuir and Debasement Tapes were subsequently released on Creation, with Bertula Bop released in 1994 on the Tristar label. A further collection, Waterbomb, compiled by Joe Foster, was released on Rev-Ola in 2003.

== Discography ==
All on Creation Records except where stated. Chart placings shown are from the UK Independent Chart.

=== Albums ===
- Pass the Paintbrush, Honey.... (1985)
- The Girl Who Runs the Beat Hotel (1987 – reissued May 1988 on CD/C, including first album)
- Oblivion (1987)
- Love Is Forever (1988)
- Songs for the Sad Eyed Girl (1990) (CD incl. Oblivion, C incl. Love Is Forever)
- Me (1991)

=== Compilations ===
- The Acid House Album (Jun 1989, CRELP046 [LP]/CRECD046 [CD])
- For the Sad Eyed Girl (1990)
- L'Amour, Demure, Stenhousemuir (Nov 1991, CRELP099 [LP]/CRECD099 [CD]/CCRE099 [C])
- Debasement Tapes (Feb 1992, CRELP125 [LP]/CRECD125 [CD])
- Bertula Pop (Apr 1994, Tristar, WK 57565 [CD])
- Waterbomb: The Best Of (Jul 2003, Rev-Ola, CRREV28 [CD])
- Biff Bang Pow! & the Laughing Apple – The Singles (2010, Vollwert, [2xCDr])
- The Singles As and Bs (2016, Poppydisc, [17xFile, ALAC])
- A Better Life: Complete Creations 1984–1991 (May 2022, Cherry Red, CRCDBOX125 [6xCD])

=== Singles ===
- "Fifty Years of Fun" (Feb 1984, CRE 003 [7"]) – No. 31
- "There Must Be a Better Life" (Jun 1984, CRE 007 [7"])
- "Love's Going Out of Fashion" (Mar 1986, CRE 024 [7"]/CRE 024 T [12"]) – No. 6
- "Someone Stole My Wheels" (Nov 1986, CRE 034 [7"]/CRE 034 T [12"]) – credited to JC Brouchard with Biff Bang Pow!, No. 31
- "The Whole World Is Turning Brouchard" (Feb 1987, CRE 038 [7"]) – No. 26
- "She Haunts" (Feb 1988, CRE 051 T [12"]) – No. 28
- "Sleep" (Nov 1990, CAFF, CAFF13 [7"] – The Mods Are Back!, split single with The Times)
- " Bang Pow! / The Times - The Mods Are Back! (7", Single)
