= Poptones =

British record label

Poptones Records
- Founded: 1999
- Founder: Alan McGee
- Defunct: 2007
- Distributor(s): Vital
- Genre: Alternative rock Indie rock Noise pop Shoegazing; Britpop
- Country of origin: United Kingdom
- Location: London, England

Poptones was a record label launched by Alan McGee after the demise of Creation Records in 1999. Its roster included The Hives, January, Oranger, Arnold, Cherrystones, King Biscuit Time, The Mardous, Thee Unstrung, The Boxer Rebellion, Beachbuggy, Pure Reason Revolution and Nick Laird-Clowes as Trashmonk. In May 2007, McGee wound down Poptones for financial reasons.

== History ==
Named after a Public Image Limited song, Poptones was seen as something of a return to the staunchly independent roots of Creation, and also included a re-issue label called From The Vaults and a reggae label run by his wife (Frazier Chorus' Kate Holmes) called In Dub. Poptones' record sleeves were designed by Mike Alway of él Records and its first releases included licensed product by The Montgolfier Brothers, Outrageous Cherry and El Vez. Most notably, the label arranged a licensing deal with Sweden's Burning Heart Records and launched the career of The Hives in the UK.

Poptones' roster included acts such as the former Creation band Arnold, psychedelic DJ Cherrystones, ex-Beta Band member Steve Mason's King Biscuit Time, Thee Unstrung, January, The Mardous, The Boxer Rebellion, The Icarus Line's sister project Souls She Said, Sailboats are White, Viking Moses, Beachbuggy, Special Needs and acey-folk acts The Singleman Affair and Pure Reason Revolution and Trashmonk, a project of Nick Laird-Clowes.

Poptones reportedly was close to signing Hole after they left Universal Music Group and before their demise in 2002.

In 2002, Poptones gained national success and media with The Hives' Your New Favourite Band album, Main Offender 7" (which featured "Lost And Found" originally performed by The Saints as a B-Side), and Supply And Demand/The Stomp 7". Your New Favourite Band album contained the international hits "Hate To Say I Told You So", "Main Offender", "Supply And Demand", "Die, Alright", and "Outsmarted" off Veni Vidi Vicious (Epitaph/Sire/Reprise Records), as well the Independent success of "Here We Go Again", "A.K.A. I-D-I-O-T", "Automatic Schmuck", and "Hail Hail Spit N'Drool" off Barely Legal (Burning Heart/Epitaph/Gearhead Records).

In May 2007, McGee told The Independent newspaper that he was winding down Poptones for financial reasons.

== See also ==
- List of record labels
