= Alan McGee =

Scottish music industry executive (born 1960)

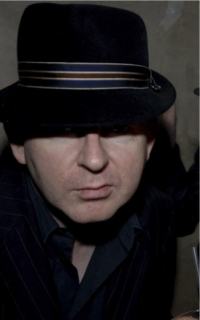

Background information
- Born: Alan John McGee; 29 September 1960 (age 66); Partick, Scotland
- Origin: Glasgow, Scotland
- Genre: Alternative rock
- Occupations: Record label owner, film producer, singer, songwriter, guitarist, DJ, music blogger
- Instrument: Guitar
- Years active: 1981–1991, 1997–1998 (as musician); 1983–2007 (as record label owner)
- Labels: Creation, Poptones, 359 Music

Alan John McGee (born 29 September 1960) is a Scottish businessman and music industry executive. He has been a record label owner, musician, manager, and music blogger for The Guardian. He co-founded the independent Creation Records label, running it from 1983 until its closure in 1999.

McGee subsequently founded the Poptones label, running it from 1999 to 2007. He has managed or championed acts such as the Jesus and Mary Chain, the Telescopes, Primal Scream, My Bloody Valentine, Ride, Momus, Oasis, and the Libertines. He was also the lead singer and guitarist for the indie pop group Biff Bang Pow!, who were active from 1983 to 1991.

== Early years ==
McGee was born in Partick, Glasgow, on 29 September 1960. He grew up in Glasgow and attended King's Park Secondary School, where he met future Primal Scream founder Bobby Gillespie. McGee left school at 16 with one O-grade. He and Gillespie were heavily into punk rock, and they joined a local punk band, the Drains, in 1978. The band's guitarist was Andrew Innes.

After the breakup of the Drains, McGee and Innes briefly joined the band H_{2}O, then moved to London and formed the band the Laughing Apple with Mark Jardim, a drummer from Croydon. In 1983, quitting his job at British Rail, he co-founded Creation Records (named after cult 1960s band the Creation).

McGee said that his intention with Creation "was to merge psychedelia with punk rock". He also formed the band Biff Bang Pow! (named after the Creation's song), which would continue until 1991, and began running a club night called "The Living Room" at The Adams Arms in Central London. He also began managing the then-unknown band the Jesus and Mary Chain, whose first single was issued on McGee's label in November 1984.

== Music industry career ==
=== Creation Records ===
Creation Records was one of the key labels in the mid-1980s indie movement, with early releases featuring artists such as Primal Scream, the Jasmine Minks, and the Loft. When the Jesus and Mary Chain moved to Warner Brothers in 1985, Creation was able to use McGee's profits as their manager to release singles by acts including Primal Scream, Felt, and the Weather Prophets. While these records were not commercially successful, McGee's enthusiasm and ability to promote Creation releases in the weekly music media ensured a healthy following. Following an unsuccessful attempt to run an offshoot label for Warner Brothers, McGee regrouped Creation and immersed himself in the burgeoning dance and acid house scene, the legacy of which saw him release era-defining albums from Creation mainstays Primal Scream and new arrivals like My Bloody Valentine and Teenage Fanclub. In 1988, he founded the book publisher Creation Books alongside James Williamson; initially an imprint of Creation Records, it later became its own company.

During this time Creation had run up considerable debts, which forced McGee to sell half of the label to Sony Music in 1992. McGee describes the Sony years as the beginning of the end of the real Creation Records, which was driven by Joe Foster, Tim Abbot, Dick Green and McGee himself, and not by Sony accountants and marketing managers. Just at the point when Creation seemed like it would collapse into receivership, the recently signed Manchester band Oasis began selling albums in huge quantities, and became one of the leading lights of the Britpop movement of the mid-1990s. The success of Oasis was unprecedented for an act on an independent label, and their second album, (What's the Story) Morning Glory?, became the biggest-selling British album of the decade.

This brought McGee substantial exposure, and his position was noted by the revitalized Labour Party, who considered him a figurehead of youth culture and courted his influence to spearhead a media campaign prior to the 1997 General Election. McGee was largely responsible for changing government legislation in relation to musicians being able to go on the New Deal, which gave musicians three years to develop and be funded by the government instead of having to take other jobs to survive. In 1998, Omnibus made a documentary about McGee and Creation for BBC One.

McGee was awarded by the NME 'Godlike Genius' award in February 1996 and Creation Records was awarded "independent label of the year" every year between 1995 and 1998 by Music Week. McGee returned to making music in 1997, collaborating with Ed Ball under the name the Chemical Pilot, releasing the album Journey to the Centre of the Mind in 1998.

While Oasis went on to sell nearly 54 million records by 2008, Creation continued issuing albums by other artists, none of which came near the success of the Manchester band. Rumours began to circulate of McGee's dissatisfaction with the direction Creation had gone. In late 1999 it was announced that Creation Records would cease operations. The final album released by the label was Primal Scream's 2000 release XTRMNTR, which went gold in the UK.

=== Post Creation: Poptones Records and Death Disco ===
The dissolution of Creation Records led to McGee forming Poptones in 2000. The label is named after a song by Public Image Limited. During this period McGee also ran an international club night, Death Disco, under which name he also DJs occasionally. Death Disco had branches in Glasgow, London, New York City, Budapest and Los Angeles, and featured appearances from artists such as the Libertines, the Killers, BRMC, Kaiser Chiefs, Glasvegas, Razorlight, the Hives, Kasabian, the Darkness, Neils Children, and the Foxes. McGee had no further involvement with Death Disco after 2009.

In May 2007, McGee told The Independent newspaper that he was winding down Poptones for financial reasons.

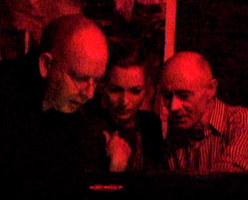
Alan McGee, Kate Moss, and BP Fallon DJing at Death Disco NY in 2004

=== Retirement from music management and other activities ===
On 12 September 2008, McGee retired from band music management and being involved with record companies after 25 years. The decision was due to his wanting to concentrate on raising his child. After he sold Creation Records to Sony, he continued to publish songs by label acts such as Oasis, Primal Scream, My Bloody Valentine, Swervedriver, Teenage Fanclub, Eugene Kelly of the Vaselines, under Creation Songs.

In 2007, McGee was made a Companion of the Liverpool Institute for Performing Arts, in recognition of the work that he has carried out with students. In November 2008, he was a visiting fellow on the popular music degree course at the University of Gloucestershire. In interviews with the Glasgow's Daily Record in September 2010 and the UK's The Independent in October 2010, McGee stated he had lost interest in music and was more interested in the esoteric and occult teachings of Aleister Crowley and Peter J. Carroll, particularly Carroll's book Liber Null.

=== 359 Music ===
In October 2012, McGee stated that he was going help curate the Japanese rock festival Tokyo Rocks in 2013 and through working with Tokyo Rocks had become interested in starting up an as yet unnamed record label in 2013. In May 2013, McGee announced the new label as a joint venture with Cherry Red Records called 359 Music. He stated he saw it as launch pad for new artists. In the ensuing month he reviewed 2500 submissions for signing, eventually signing 20 artists.

=== Creation Management ===
McGee announced in May 2014 he had restarted Creation Management with Simon Fletcher and signed the Jesus and Mary Chain as his first clients. The roster subsequently expanded to include Wilko Johnson, Happy Mondays, Black Grape, Cast, Glasvegas, the Bluetones, and Shaun William Ryder solo projects.

=== Creation23 ===
In August 2018, Alan McGee announced the launch of a new 7-inch label named Creation23, also with Fletcher. The label's first release was from North Essex group Rubber Jaw.

In 2020 McGee set up the Creation Day festival, in collaboration with the City of Wolverhampton Council. The festival was originally due to be held at West Park, Wolverhampton on 29–30 May 2021, with Happy Mondays, Editors, and Echo and the Bunnymen as headliners, but was delayed for a year due to the COVID-19 pandemic. The festival, now branded as the Utilita Creation Day festival, is now due to take place on 28–29 May 2022, featuring IDLES and Happy Mondays as headliners, as well as Glasvegas, Sleeper, Ash, and several acts signed to Creation23.

=== Creation Youth Music ===
In 2024, McGee co-founded a new record label, Creation Youth Music.

== Political views ==
In January 2000 he likened the Labour Party to Big Brother in George Orwell's Nineteen Eighty-Four, and accused Tony Blair of being a "control freak". He had previously been one of Labour's biggest financial donors, having donated £100,000 to the party.

One of McGee's last acts as the head of Creation Records was to use £20,000 of the company's money to fund Malcolm McLaren's campaign to run for Mayor of London.

In late 2009, McGee withdrew his support for the Labour Party, and wrote an article for The Sun on 1 October 2009 in which he praised Conservative leader David Cameron, saying that "at least David Cameron looks like a leader."

In the 2010 general election, McGee stated that he had voted for Liberal Democrat Roger Williams.

He endorsed the Scottish National Party ahead of the 2015 general election.

== Other media ==
From 2006 to 2010, Alan McGee wrote for The Guardian's weekly music blog. From 2011 to 2016, he blogged for The Huffington Post UK.

=== Autobiography ===
McGee's autobiography Creation Stories was scheduled to be published in Europe on 7 November 2013, by Pan MacMillan. McGee's autobiography was optioned by Burning Wheel Productions and has been adapted into a film screenplay by Irvine Welsh and Dean Cavanagh, due to be introduced at the next Cannes Film Festival.

=== Films ===
Upside Down, a film about Creation Records, premiered at the BFI in London on 23 and 24 October 2010. It was scheduled for worldwide release in May 2011.

In February 2012, McGee announced in the Huffington Post that he had started a new film company with writer and director Dean Cavanagh, who still works with Irvine Welsh, called Escalier 39. The film Kubricks was scheduled to be shot in 2012 on the grounds of McGee's house in Wales. In the film McGee plays himself. He appears in Svengali, which premiered at the Edinburgh International Film Festival in June 2013. According to The Hollywood Reporter, McGee "enjoys a surprising amount of screen-time and, in what is perhaps a deliberate in-joke, is never seen without his Trilby hat".

McGee features extensively in the documentary film Teenage Superstars, which focuses on the Glasgow independent music scene during the early years of Creation Records.

Creation Stories is a 2021 biographical film about McGee and Creation, directed by Nick Moran. The film was adapted from McGee's autobiography by Welsh and Cavanagh.

== Personal life ==
McGee's mid-1990s drug intake was such that he eventually suffered a breakdown. He has said he has no idea of the amounts of drugs he was using at this point, but that he cannot remember anything of the year 1993 other than the signing of Oasis. He added that Oasis were 'cool' about his cleaning up, but that his sober state made his relationship with Primal Scream difficult.

McGee has been married twice. His first marriage was unsuccessful but produced a son named Daniel. Due to McGee's former long-term drug habit, he had been estranged from his first wife and had not seen his son since he was a baby. Dan was adopted by his ex-wife's new husband in 1994 and his name was changed to Daniel Devine. In 2005, McGee told The Independent that his son, whom he had not seen since he was a baby, had contacted him and they had reunited, though they were later reported to be estranged again.

Since 1998, McGee has been married to Kate Holmes, of the band Client and formerly of Frazier Chorus and Technique, who now runs the fashion label Client London. They have been together since 1994, and have one child.

McGee is a supporter of Rangers.

== Discography ==
=== with The Laughing Apple ===
- "Ha Ha Hee Hee" 7-inch (1981), Autonomy
- "Participate!" 7-inch (1981), Autonomy
- "Precious Feeling" 7-inch (1982), Essential
- "Wouldn't You" 7-inch flexi-disc (1983), Creation - included with The Legend!'s "'73 in '83" single

=== with Biff Bang Pow! ===
see Biff Bang Pow! discography

=== with The Chemical Pilot ===
- "Astral Dominoes" 12-inch/CD-single (1998), Eruption
- "Move a Little Closer" 12-inch single (1998), Eruption
- Journey to the Centre of the Mind album (1998), Eruption
