= Creation Records =

British independent record label

Creation Records Ltd.
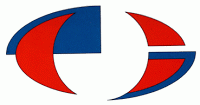
- Parent company: Sony Music Entertainment
- Founded: 1983
- Founder: Alan McGee; Dick Green; Joe Foster
- Defunct: 1999
- Genre: Various
- Country of origin: United Kingdom
- Location: London, England
- Official website: creation-records.com

Creation Records Ltd. was a British independent record label founded in 1983 by Alan McGee, Dick Green, and Joe Foster. Its name came from the 1960s band The Creation, whom McGee greatly admired. The label ceased operations in 1999, although it was revived at one point in 2011 for the release of the compilation album Upside Down.

Over the course of its sixteen-year history, Creation predominantly focused on alternative rock, releasing several influential indie rock, shoegaze, and Britpop records, but also featured bands performing various other styles of rock, including indie pop and post-punk, as well as some electronic, folk, and experimental artists. Their roster has included The Jesus and Mary Chain, Primal Scream, Felt, My Bloody Valentine, and Oasis.

== Early years ==
McGee formed Creation Records following the culmination of various projects, including fanzine Communication Blur, his own rock outfit The Laughing Apple (with future Primal Scream guitarist and long-time friend Andrew Innes), and his running of the venue The Communication Club. Initially, McGee wished to provide an outlet for like minded musicians and an opportunity for young bands to see their work on vinyl. Primarily the label was in opposition to the "manufactured" synth pop of the era, that bore little resemblance to the work of his favourite acts including Public Image Ltd and the Sex Pistols.

McGee started the label by putting out the "'73 in '83" single by The Legend!, after taking out a £1,000 bank loan. Around the same time, he started a club called The Living Room in Tottenham Court Road, through which he met several people who would go on to record for Creation, including Peter Astor, John Robb and Lawrence. Distributor Rough Trade soon began funding releases.

Creation was among the key labels in the mid-1980s indie movement, with early artists such as The Jesus and Mary Chain, The Membranes and Primal Scream. The Jesus and Mary Chain went to record for Warner Brothers in 1985, yet McGee remained as their manager. With the profits he had made from the band, he was able to release singles by label acts such as Primal Scream, Felt, and The Weather Prophets.

McGee had enthusiasm and an uncanny ability to attract the weekly music media, and he was able to get a growing underground following. In their early days, he was able to project a notorious image of The Jesus and Mary Chain, which had often courted violence and loutish behaviour.

The early years of Creation feature prominently in 2017 documentary, Teenage Superstars.

== Mid-period ==
Following an unsuccessful attempt to run an offshoot label for Warner Brothers (Elevation Records), McGee regrouped Creation and immersed himself in the burgeoning dance and acid house scene starting in the late 1980s. Those scenes had influenced Creation mainstays such as Primal Scream and Ed Ball, as well as newer arrivals such as My Bloody Valentine.

In 1988, McGee and James Williamson launched the book publisher Creation Books. It was later spun out into its own company.

Creation Records' releases at this time tended to be critically acclaimed, without being major commercial hits. Creation had run up considerable debt that was only held off until McGee sold half the company to Sony Music in 1992. There were reports of McGee's escalating drug use, as well as numerous and conflicting reports of the label being nearly bankrupted after funding the two-year-long recording of My Bloody Valentine's 1991 Loveless.

== Sony years ==
After selling to Sony, Creation signed Oasis, whose debut album Definitely Maybe became a huge critical and commercial success. The band went on to epitomise the cultural Britpop movement of the mid-1990s. The success of Oasis was unprecedented for an act on an independent label. Their second album, (What's the Story) Morning Glory? became the biggest selling British album of the decade.

In the 1990s, Creation launched the subsidiary Rev-Ola Records, which was formed by Joe Foster. Rev-Ola is now a part of the PoppyDisc group of labels.

The revitalised Labour Party took note of McGee's accomplishments with Creation. They got McGee to spearhead a media campaign prior to the 1997 general election in order to appeal to Britain's youth culture. He was largely responsible for changing government legislation in relation to musicians being able to go on the New Deal which gave musicians three years to develop and be funded by the government instead of having to take other jobs to survive.

Omnibus went on to make a documentary on McGee and Creation in 1998 for BBC One. Creation Records was awarded 'Independent Label of the Year' every year between 1995 and 1998 by Music Week, and McGee was awarded the NME 'Godlike Genius' award in February 1995.

In the United States and Canada, some of Creation's catalogue was licensed to various non-Sony record labels such as A&M Records (Swervedriver), DGC Records (Teenage Fanclub [outside Europe]), SBK Records (Adorable, Slowdive), and Sire Records (My Bloody Valentine, Primal Scream, Ride [outside the United Kingdom]).

== Dissolution ==
According to the documentary Upside Down, McGee and Foster opted to close Creation in December 1999 after McGee began to suffer burnout and disillusionment with the label. The label's final release was XTRMNTR by Primal Scream, issued in January 2000, shortly after the label ceased functioning.

The dissolution of Creation Records in 1999 led to McGee and Foster forming Poptones. The label saw a return to the staunchly independent roots of Creation, and had most notably launched the career of The Hives in the UK.

In May 2007, McGee told The Independent newspaper that he was winding down Poptones for financial reasons.

Upside Down, a film on Creation Records premiered at the BFI in London on 23 and 24 October 2010. It was released on DVD in the UK on 9 May 2011. Additionally, a soundtrack album compiled by Joe Foster featuring 34 tracks which covered the entire career of Creation Records was released. This album was released on Creation Records, which was revived for the release of the album only.

In numerous interviews in 2012, McGee said he was "seriously considering" resurrecting Creation Records but took up an offer from Cherry Red Records to launch 359 Music instead.

After the partnership with Cherry Red came to an end, McGee launched label specialising in releasing 7 inch vinyl records. This label was called Creation23 and was seen as the new incarnation of Creation Records. Acts who had singles released by the label included The K's, Shambolics, Rubber Jaw, Young Garbo and Juggs.

== "It's Creation Baby" ==
On 1 February 2021, McGee relaunched Creation23 as the "It's Creation Baby" record label and became the sole owner of the company. The label would now sign acts and put out albums as well as 7 inch singles, with Astrid's Charlie Clark releasing a solo album called Late Night Drinking as the label's first album release. By December 2021, McGee had overseen releases by acts such as Marquis Drive, Shambolics and The Illicits (bands who had been previously part of Creation23) as well as singles by Caterina Speranza's band CAT SFX and Cast member John Power, who released a solo single called "Grounded Truth" via the label. McGee also launched an indie music festival using the Creation name, set up by McGee to showcase his acts on a bill which also includes named headliners from the indie music scene. The festival, now called the Utilita Creation Day Festival, was due to be held in Wolverhampton in 2021 but was postponed until 2022.

== Roster ==
=== Principal bands or musicians ===
- 3 Colours Red
- 18 Wheeler
- Adorable
- Arnold
- Heidi Berry
- Biff Bang Pow!
- Blow Up
- BMX Bandits
- The Bodines
- The Boo Radleys
- Bernard Butler
- A Certain Ratio
- The Chills
- The Cramps
- The Creation
- Dreadzone
- Bill Drummond
- Felt
- Five Go Down to the Sea?
- Fluke
- Glen Matlock
- Guided by Voices
- Heavy Stereo
- The House of Love
- Hurricane #1
- Hypnotone
- Idha
- The Jasmine Minks
- The Jazz Butcher
- The Jesus and Mary Chain
- The Legend!
- The Lilac Time
- The Loft
- Love Corporation
- Meat Whiplash
- Medicine
- The Membranes
- Momus
- Moonshake
- Bob Mould
- My Bloody Valentine
- Nikki Sudden
- Oasis
- The Pastels
- Primal Scream
- The Revolving Paint Dream
- Ride
- Kevin Rowland
- Ruby
- Saint Etienne
- Silverfish
- Slaughter Joe
- Slowdive
- The Sneetches
- Sugar
- Super Furry Animals
- Swervedriver
- Technique
- Teenage Fanclub
- Teenage Filmstars
- The Telescopes
- The Times
- Ultra Living
- Velvet Crush
- The Weather Prophets

== Sublabels ==
=== Infonet ===
Infonet was an electronic music sublabel to Creation Records, run by Chris Abbot. It was active between 1992 and 1997. Main bands on the label were Bandulu (with various aliases) and Reload. Infonet also released records with Andrea Parker and David Morley, Eddie Fowlkes, Sulphuric, Syzygy, among others.

=== August Records ===
August Records was a short-lived Creation Records offshoot A&R'd by former Fire Records boss Dave Barker. It was active between 1992 and 1994. Acts included 18 Wheeler (later transferred to Creation), Eugenius (ex-Fire Records), Shonen Knife and Ween.

=== Icerink ===
Icerink was a sublabel to Creation Records, run by Saint Etienne. It was active between 1992 and 1994. It released ten singles (by Shampoo and Earl Brutus, among others) and a compilation, We Are Icerink.

=== Ball Product ===
Ball Product was a short-lived Creation sublabel, run by Edward Ball. It released four albums during 1992–1993, by Link Wray, The Dentists, Further, and Brenda Kahn.

=== Eruption Records ===
Eruption Records was a sublabel to Creation Records, Richard Norris was the label's A&R Consultant. It was active between 1996 and 1999. Acts include Wamdue Project, among others.

== See also ==
- Creation Stories (film)
