= Katrina Mitchell (musician) =

- Born: Scotland
- Occupation: Musician
- Instruments: Drums, vocals, guitar, keyboards
- Works: Mobile Safari (1995); Illumination (1997); Slow Summits (2013); The Last Great Wilderness OST (2002)
- Years active: 1989–present
- Member of: The Pastels; Melody Dog
- Partner: Stephen McRobbie

Katrina Mitchell is a Scottish musician who joined The Pastels in 1989. In 2000, Mitchell set up the Domino Records imprint Geographic with The Pastels co-member Stephen McRobbie as well as Glasgow music institution, Monorail Music in 2002.

== Biography ==
Mitchell joined The Pastels in 1989 to become the drummer for the band's second line-up, alongside original member (and her partner) Stephen McRobbie and long-standing member Annabel 'Aggi' Wright. At the time, Mitchell did not know how to drum. She has since contributed drums, vocals, guitars and keyboards to the "cracked urban folk music produced" by the Pastels' central pairing.

The Glasgow Herald described Mitchell and McRobbie as the "unassuming pair eating soup in Glasgow's Mono cafe" and the 'nucleus' or 'core' of the group.

"Pastelism" is not her day job however, as Mitchell also works for HIV organisation, Phace Scotland.

=== Monorail Music ===
Mitchell also became involved in setting up Monorail Music, in Glasgow, in December 2002 as a cafe bar, vegetarian restaurant and gig venue with its attached record store which gives "their discerning customers kid-in-a-sweetshop type palpitations at the wonders on offer".

=== Geographic ===
Mitchell, through the Geographic imprint, has released a whole set of musical wares such as Scottish artists Future Pilot AKA, Bill Wells and International Airport, and Japanese popsters Maher Shalal Hash Baz and Nagisa Ni Te. Geographic is a subsidiary of Domino Records, a respected independent label which is home to Will Oldham, (Smog) and Royal Trux.

=== 'Girls Rock Glasgow' ===
In 2015 and 2016, Mitchell volunteered her time running a Summer school for 'the rock stars of tomorrow' with Jude Stewart, who co-ran Glasgow's early-2000s femme-punk hoopla Frock On. Stina Marie Claire Tweeddale from Glasgow duo Honeyblood, and Suse Bear from Tuff love were also involved.

This Summer school was a week-long rock 'n' roll camp for girls aged between eight and sixteen years old and took place at Kinning Park. The aim was to teach the girls about the basics of guitar, keyboards, bass, drums, how to sing, how to form a band and how to make songs up. The project was inspired by the Portland, Oregon, summer rock camps for girls, which were set up around 2005 as part of the Riot grrrl movement.

"The aim was to inspire girls to stand at the front of gigs and not feel compromised, and to take their space in rock and roll. With all the attention male rock stars get, it's important to address this as wee girls express themselves and have dreams to headline Glastonbury. All the headliners are male in the world of rock. Our thing is to give girls really positive role models for what they could be.... Girls Rock Glasgow is about creating a place where girls can express themselves. We don't have anyone taking photos or filming. We don't like the girls to feel self-conscious. It's not like X Factor, it's much more creative and silly."

Students enrol on the scheme on a 'pay-what-you-can' basis. As Stewart states:

"There's so many arts and theatre projects where you need to come from quite a middle class background to be able to access [them] and we wanted Girls Rock Glasgow to be as accessible as possible."

Additionally, in the run up to the Summer school week, fundraising events take place: offering clothes swaps; and an alteration table for customising clothes; and a zine making station. The week concluded with family and friends seeing the girls perform as part of a showcase finale.

== Other projects ==
"Their two decade-old lineage has featured members of Teenage Fanclub and others from the Bellshill musical mafia [Belle and Sebastian]. More recent collaborations have embraced German electronicist Barbara Morgenstern and Tortoise's John McIntyre."

=== Melody Dog ===
In the early 1990s, Mitchell also formed the band Melody Dog with Pat Laureate.

=== Belle and Sebastian ===
Belle and Sebastian's Stevie Jackson described Mitchell and composer/ pianist Bill Wells as two of his favourite musicians and booked time to work with them both in the studio on a new record in 2011. Though, admits to struggling to get them for more than one day.

== Discography ==
=== The Pastels ===
- Mobile Safari (1995)
- Illumination (1997)
- Yoga (EP) (2002)
- Slow Summits (2013)

=== Soundtracks ===
Mitchell and the Pastels supplied the music for David McKenzie's 2002 film The Last Great Wilderness.

== Legacy ==
Writing of Mitchell's (and the Pastels) place in the music pantheon, The Scotsman states:

"The Pastels were at the forefront of an independent music movement in Scotland, one which fused the DIY attitude of punk with the sumptuous sounds of late-1960s psychedelia. Of the band's contemporaries, the Jesus & Mary Chain had an explosive impact, the Soup Dragons made it on to Top of the Pops and Primal Scream enjoyed slow-release success and lasted the course. Later on, Teenage Fanclub and Belle & Sebastian emerged, embodying the same spirit, to inspire the next generation of melodic guitar-slingers to exercise the healthy degree of autonomy which still pervades the work of current local heroes such as the Delgados and Mogwai."
