= Ian Carmichael (musician) =

Scottish sound engineer

Ian Carmichael (born 1 June 1960) is a Scottish sound engineer, born in Glasgow. He started his career as a live sound engineer, before building his own recording studio called Toad Hall in Glasgow in 1986. His most notable productions are for Glasgow indie band The Orchids, before he started his own band, One Dove, in 1991, with their influential album release, Morning Dove White in 1993. When One Dove split in 1995, Carmichael went on to work with Manchester band Lamb, with recording and mixing credits on both Fear of Fours and What Sound. He also produced and remixed for Glasgow indie band The Pastels on their albums Mobile Safari (1995), Illumination (1997), and Illuminati (1998), as well as Bis ("Detour" single), and Manchester garage band, Un-Cut.

He is currently releasing music with a new electro-acoustic duo called Montjuïc, with James Hackett, lead vocalist of The Orchids. Their debut album Things Must Change was released in September 2025, reaching No.7 in the Official UK Independent Charts.
