= The Badgeman =

English indie rock band (1988–1992)

The Badgeman were a four-piece indie rock band from Salisbury, Wiltshire formed in 1988, although music journalist Pete Frame claims in his book Rockin Around Britain that the band hailed from Melksham. The band has been variously categorised as Alternative rock, shoegazing, indie rock, psychedelic rock, and post punk. The band released two albums on Paperhouse Records, and appeared on two compilation releases, along with artists such as Nirvana, Lee Ranaldo of Sonic Youth, Echo and The Bunnymen, and The Wedding Present.

== History ==
The band was formed by John Packwood (guitar), Tim Kerley (drums), Neale Hancock (vocals/guitar), and Simon Wigglesworth (bass), all of whom had previously played together in The Hunny Monsturs. The band's name is a reference to a figure in conspiracy theories surrounding the death of John F. Kennedy.

The band's initial release, "Go Insane!", appeared on a two track shared flexi disc along with a contribution from fellow Salisbury indie pop band The Mayfields (part of a lively local indie scene also including Bubblegum Splash! and Jane from Occupied Europe (band)). The disc was distributed by several popular fanzines, including Sowing Seeds, and led to The Badgeman being signed by the well respected independent label Glass Records (other artists on this label included Spacemen 3, The Pastels, Jazz Butcher, and Mayo Thompson) during 1989. The band recorded an album for Glass but it remained unreleased due to the label's financial problems, and when the label dissolved, its founder David E. Barker signed The Badgeman to his new venture Paperhouse (along with Walkingseeds, Teenage Fanclub, Phil Shoenfelt, Don Fleming and Gumball), a subsidiary of Fire Records of London.

A single, "Crystals", and album, Kings of the Desert, were released in January 1990 to favourable reviews and articles from such journalists as Edwin Pouncey (aka Savage Pencil) and Phil McMullen in NME, Melody Maker, Sounds, Ptolemaic Terrascope, and the first issue of Select magazine (which awarded the album 4 out of 5). The general critical consensus at the time appeared to describe The Badgeman as a 1960s inspired indie rock band, whilst after one of several plays on his radio show, the DJ John Peel described their single, "Crystals", as "prog rock". The band toured Europe in 1990 with Teenage Fanclub.

At the end of 1990 The Badgeman recorded four tracks which were to appear during 1991 as the Curse of The Badgeman EP. This release, according to Moody and Nash in their book Endless Beat, was regarded by the band as a huge step forward artistically. During the same year Imaginary Records (home to The Bachelor Pad, Cud, and The Mock Turtles) released a version of "Sister Ray", recorded by The Badgeman during 1990, as part of a three volume tribute to The Velvet Underground entitled Heaven & Hell. This recording resurfaced during 2010 as part of another VU tribute, Unpiecing The Jigsaw, released by Ozit Records.

The final LP by The Badgeman appeared on Paperhouse c. early 1992. Entitled Ritual Landscape, this album was a critical and commercial failure at the time of its release but has since come to be regarded as an artistic triumph. The album's most notable champion, the musician, writer, and historian Julian Cope went so far as to make Ritual Landscape his Unsung Album Of The Month in December 2007 on his highly regarded Head Heritage Unsung website, describing the band's sound in such terms as "post punk..folk..muscular..heathen racket". The same review appears in Cope's book of collected writings on the subject of obscure or underappreciated rock and roll, Copendium. The cover art features in Andrew Johnstones book How The Neolthics Influenced Rock'n'Roll

The band split up shortly after the album's release, with Hancock, Wigglesworth, and Kerley forming Big Bird.

== Discography ==
=== Albums ===
- Kings of the Desert (1990), Paperhouse
- Ritual Landscape (1992), Paperhouse

=== Singles ===
- "Go Insane!" (as 'The Badgeman?')/The Mayfields - "All You Ever Say" (1988), Compact & Bijou - flexi disc
- "Crystals" (1990), Paperhouse
- Curse of The Badgeman EP (1991), Paperhouse
- "English Road Song" (1992), Paperhouse

=== Compilation Appearances ===
- Heaven & Hell - A Tribute to The Velvet Underground, Vol.3 including "Sister Ray" (as 'Badgeman') (1990), Imaginary
- Unpiecing The Jigsaw (2009), Ozit
