= Illuminati (The Pastels album) =

Remix album by The Pastels
- Released: 1998
- Recorded: 1997
- Genres: alternative rock, remix, electronic
- Length: 74:13
- Label: Domino

The Pastels chronology
Truckload Of Trouble (1994)	Illuminati (1998)

Professional ratings
Review scores
Source	Rating
Allmusic	3.5/5 stars
Pitchfork Media	(9.5/10)

Illuminati is a remix album credited to The Pastels, released in 1998. It contains remixes of songs from The Pastels' album Illumination by artists such as Stereolab, Mouse on Mars and My Bloody Valentine.

== Track listing ==
1. "Magic Nights" (My Bloody Valentine Remix) – 1:16
2. "The Viaduct" (Kid Loco Remix) – 6:01
3. "Windy Hill" (Cornelius Remix) – 3:41
4. "One Wild Moment" (Stereolab Remix) – 4:59
5. "Attic Plan" (Mouse on Mars Remix) – 6:29
6. "Remote Climbs" (Cinema Remix) – 5:15
7. "Remote Climbs" (John McEntire Remix) – 5:38
8. "The Viaduct" (Ian Carmichael Remix) – 4:52
9. "Thomson Colour" (To Rococo Rot Remix) – 3:53
10. "Cycle" (My Bloody Valentine Remix) – 6:39
11. "On the Way" (The Third Eye Foundation Remix) – 5:51
12. "Rough Riders" (Future Pilot Aka Remix) – 4:34
13. "Rough Riders" (The Make-Up / Mighty Flashlight Remix) – 4:26
14. "Frozen Wave" (Flacco Remix) – 5:52
15. "The Viaduct" (Bill Wells Remix) – 2:13
16. "Leaving This Island" (Jim O'Rourke Remix) – 2:34
