= David Westlake =

English singer-songwriter

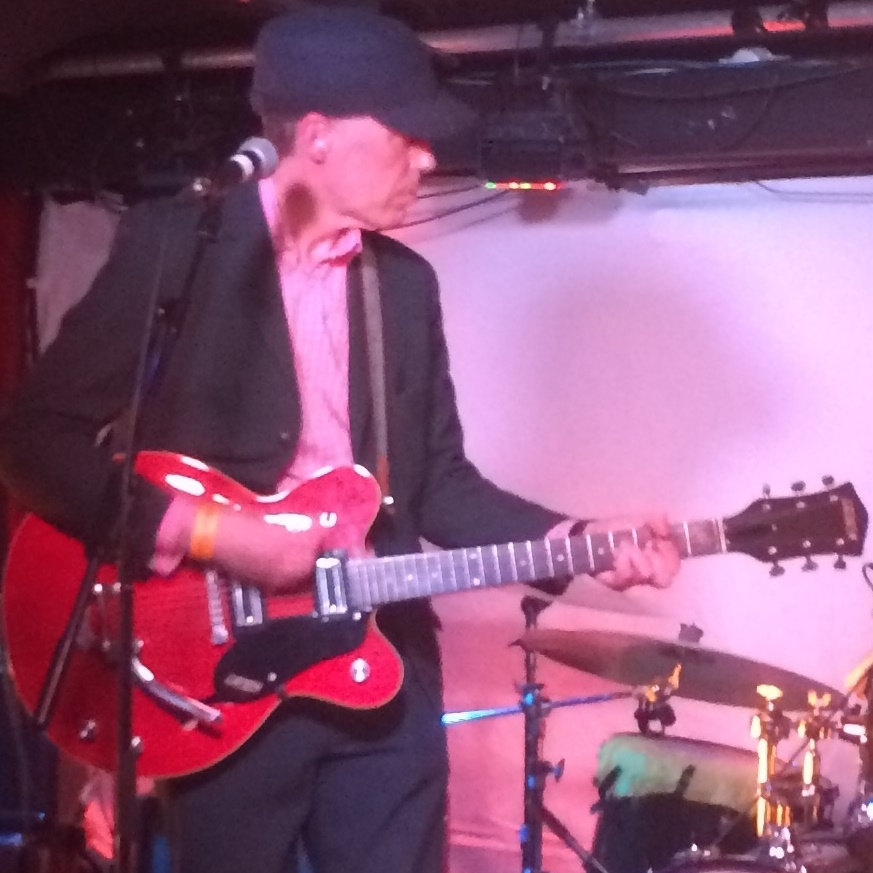
- At the NME C86 show – London, 2014

Background information
- Born: 12 February 1965 (age 61); Hayes, Middlesex, England
- Origin: England
- Genres: Indie, art rock
- Occupation: Singer-songwriter
- Instrument: Guitar
- Years active: 1985-present
- Label: Cherry Red Records
- Formerly of: The Servants
- Spouse: Patsy Westlake
- Website: lost-sheep.com/ davidwestlake

David Westlake (born 12 February 1965) is an English singer/songwriter. He led indie band The Servants from 1985 to 1991.

== Early life ==
Born in 1965, David Westlake grew up at No. 9, First Avenue in Hayes, Middlesex. After attending primary school in Hayes, he went to a Catholic boys' grammar school in Harrow, "which was perpetual violence".

== The Servants ==
The Servants existed from the summer of 1985 to August 1991. They appeared on the NME's C86 compilation, and a trio of singles on Head and Glass Records paved the way for first Servants album Disinterest on Paperhouse Records in 1990. Second Servants album Small Time (recorded 1991) eventually saw the light of day on Cherry Red Records in 2012.

== Solo ==
David Westlake released a first solo album in 1987 on Creation Records. Originally titled Westlake, Optic Nerve Recordings reissued the album in 2023 as D87. The 1987 recording was "a way station on the way to a reactivated Servants".

In 2002, Westlake released self-pressed album Play Dusty for Me (Mahlerphone) in a limited issue that quickly sold out. Cherry Red Records reissued the album in 2026.

Westlake and band played at an NME C86 show on 14 June 2014, staged at Venue 229 in London, to coincide with Cherry Red's expanded reissue of C86. As in 1986, when The Servants performed in the original C86 gig-week at the Institute of Contemporary Arts, The Wedding Present played on the same night.

In 2022, Tiny Global Productions released My Beautiful England, which is "packed with some of Westlake's best songs." Cherry Red Records reissued the album in 2026.

== Artistry ==
Neil Davenport at Louder Than War says "Westlake remains one of Britain's most underrated melodic craftsmen, capable of making the difficult appear effortless." In 2022 book Whatever Happened to the C86 Kids?: An Indie Odyssey, author Nige Tassell credits Westlake with having written "some of the most literate indie-pop and art-rock songs written in the last thirty years". Kieron Tyler at The Arts Desk calls the songwriting "manifestly great", while labelling Westlake "a bona fide English curiosity".

Working "at his own measured pace", and recognised as having "anti-industry instincts", Westlake's preference for remaining "off the beaten track of the music business guarantee[s] an innate obscurity." Former band-mate Luke Haines is supportive, saying in 2023: "David Westlake albums are like rare orchids. You should grasp them to your heart when they arrive."

== Personal life ==
According to Nige Tassell's 2022 book, David Westlake and wife Patsy live in Oxfordshire. He qualified and worked as a solicitor in the 1990s; subsequently an academic, he taught early modern literature for seventeen years. His Ph.D. is in Jacobean satire.

== Discography ==
=== Solo ===
==== Albums ====
- D87 a.k.a. Westlake (1987, Creation Records; Optic Nerve Recordings expanded issue, 2023)
- Play Dusty for Me (2002, Mahlerphone; reissued 2026)
- My Beautiful England (2022, Tiny Global Productions; reissued 2026)

=== With the Servants ===
==== Albums ====
- Disinterest (1990, Paperhouse Records)
- Reserved (compilation; 2006, Cherry Red Records; reissued in reduced form as Youth Club Disco, 2011)
- Small Time/Hey Hey We’re the Manqués (2012, Cherry Red Records)
- Entrance – The C86 Line-up Singles (compilation; 2026, Cherry Red Records)

==== Singles ====
- "She's Always Hiding" (1986, Head: 7"; reissued 2021)
- "The Sun, a Small Star" (1986, Head: 12"; reissued 2019: 7")
- "It's My Turn" (1989, Glass Records: 7" & 12")
- "Look Like a Girl" (1990, Paperhouse Records: 7")
