= Disinterest =

Disinterest may refer to:

- Disinterest, not influenced by considerations of personal advantage: see interest (emotion)
- Disinterest (album), a 1990 album by The Servants
