= Katrina Mitchell =

Katrina Mitchell may refer to:

- Katie Mitchell, English theatre director
- Katrina Mitchell (musician), Scottish musician who is a member of The Pastels
