= Suck on the Pastels =

Compilation album by The Pastels
- Released: 1988
- Recorded: 1983–1985
- Genre: Indie pop, jangle pop, post-punk
- Label: Gasatanka

The Pastels chronology
Up for a Bit with The Pastels (1987)	Suck on the Pastels (1988)	Sittin' Pretty (1989)

Professional ratings
Review scores
Source	Rating
Allmusic	link

Suck on the Pastels is a compilation album by The Pastels, released in 1988. It consists of a number of singles and B-sides released by the band between 1983 and 1985, as well as three tracks from a BBC session recorded in 1984. Tracks 4, 6 and 7 come from this session. The Rough Guide to Rock writes that it "served to maintain the band's profile during a largely unproductive 1988."

Like Sittin' Pretty, the album is currently out of print.

== Track listing ==
1. "Baby Honey"
2. "I Wonder Why"
3. "Something Going On"
4. "Million Tears"
5. "Surprise Me"
6. "She Always Cries on Sunday"
7. "Baby Honey"
8. "I'm Alright With You"
9. "Couldn't Care Less"
10. "What's It Worth"

== Personnel ==
- Stephen McRobbie (a.k.a. Stephen Pastel) – lead vocals, guitar
- Brian Taylor (a.k.a. Brian Superstar) – guitar
- Martin Hayward – bass, vocals
- Annabel Wright – vocals, organ, artwork
- Bernice Simpson – drums
- Sandy Forbes – drums on "Something Going On"
- Jill Bryson – backing vocals on "I Wonder Why"
- Rose McDowall – backing vocals on "I Wonder Why"

== Notes ==
- Tracks 1, 4 and 5 originally released on the 1984 single Million Tears
- Track 2 originally released as a single in 1983
- Track 3 originally released as a single in 1984
- Tracks 8, 9 and 10 originally released on the 1985 single I'm Alright With You
- Tracks 4, 6 and 7 recorded for a David Jensen BBC session on 1 July 1984, previously unreleased

The BBC session tracks were not originally broadcast. One song from the session; "Twenty Five Unfinished Plays", an early version of their 1986 single "Truck Train Tractor", has never been released but is available online.

The original version of "Million Tears" from the single is not included but is available on several Various Artists compilations.
