= Westlake (album) =

Studio album by David Westlake
- Released: November 1987
- Recorded: 18–19 April 1987
- Studio: Greenhouse, London EC1
- Genre: Indie rock
- Length: 22:46
- Label: Creation
- Producer: Paul Gadd, Steve Nunn

David Westlake chronology
Westlake (1987)	Play Dusty for Me (2002)

Westlake is the first album by English singer/songwriter David Westlake. Creation Records released the album in November 1987. Under the title D87, the album was reissued in expanded form in August 2023.

== Recording ==
Westlake is a mini-album recorded 18-19 April 1987 at Greenhouse Studios on Old Street, Islington, London EC1. It was produced by Paul Gadd (son of Gary Glitter) and Steve Nunn.

The record was Luke Haines’s first release. The Triffids’ rhythm section plays on the record.

Alternative recordings of “The Word Around Town” and “She Grew and She Grew” appear on Hey Hey We’re The Manqués, a collection of demos issued by Cherry Red Records in 2012 with The Servants’ second album Small Time.

== Release history ==
Creation Records released the original vinyl album in November 1987 (CRELP 019). A CD issue followed in August 1993 (CRECD 019).

Creation Records gave the album its title. Westlake at first intended naming the album after its opening track:

Initially, I had in mind that it would be a Servants record called The Word Around Town. But in the music press there was always a thin-column advert for a mail-order company called Small Wonder Records. The available space meant they would abbreviate titles to fit into their adverts. For instance, they’d have Joy Div LWTUA for Joy Division’s Love Will Tear Us Apart. I realised that having my name next to The Word Around Town in acronym-form would be something best avoided.

Shortly before the album’s release, “The Word Around Town” appeared on Doing God's Work – A Creation Compilation, issued October 1987.

Re-titled D87, Optic Nerve Recordings issued the album in expanded form on 25 August 2023. D87 includes a four-song BBC Radio 1 session recorded in 1987, and two demos of otherwise-unrecorded songs, “Take Me to Your Heart” and “Never Grow Up".

== Reception ==
Professional ratings
Review scores
Source	Rating
Mojo	4/5 stars
New Musical Express	7/10
Scottish Daily Express	4/5 stars
Shindig!	4/5 stars

Luke Haines describes the album as “a minor classic”. On original release, Melody Maker called Westlake a record of “wry melancholy”, praising the songs’ poetic quality, and the “sheer ease and glow” of the music. In 2023, the Scottish Daily Express said D87 was “a long-overdue reissue” and “A long-lost gem.” The Arts Desk said “the David Westlake of this period was firing on all cylinders”, welcoming the reissue: “any reminder of his flair as a songwriter is welcome”. Mojo labelled the album “Lit-pop”, singling out “the urgent, bookish ‘The Word Around Town’.” Shindig! called D87 “literate ... rock ’n’ roll”, recognising that the reissue had been renamed to reference the C86 compilation on which Westlake appeared in his band The Servants, and noting that “If not for the lack of a full-time rhythm section, [the original release] would’ve been The Servants’ debut”.

== Track listing ==
1. "The Word Around Town" – 3:35
2. "Dream Come True" – 3:22
3. "Rings On Her Fingers" – 4:39
4. "Everlasting" – 4:18
5. "She Grew And She Grew" – 3:33
6. "Talk Like That" – 3:19

=== D87 (2023) ===
Side one:

1. "The Word Around Town" – 3:36
2. "She Grew And She Grew" – 3:36
3. "Rings On Her Fingers" – 4:40
4. "Talk Like That" – 3:18
5. "Dream Come True" – 3:25
6. "Everlasting" – 4:18

Side two:

1. "Faithful to 3 Lovers (BBC)" – 3:24
2. "Everlasting (BBC)" – 4:18
3. "The Word Around Town (BBC)" – 3:51
4. "Dream Come True (BBC)" – 2:42
5. "Take Me To Your Heart (demo)" – 3:23
6. "Never Grow Up (demo)" – 3:08

== Personnel ==
- David Westlake – vocals & guitar
- Luke Haines – guitar & piano
- Martyn P. Casey – bass
- Alsy MacDonald – drums

=== D87 (Side Two) ===
- Robert Forster – guitar
- Amanda Brown – violin, oboe & backing vocals
- Robert Vickers – bass
- Cormac Moore – bass
- John Wills – drums
- Dr Rhythm – drums
