= Play Dusty for Me =

- Pink-cover U.S. reissue

Studio album by David Westlake
- Released: 11 June 2002
- Recorded: August 2001, Kilkenny, Ireland
- Genre: Indie rock
- Length: 54:50
- Language: English
- Labels: Mahlerphone; Cherry Red Records
- Producer: Cormac Moore

David Westlake chronology
Westlake (1987)	Play Dusty for Me (2002)	My Beautiful England (2022)

Professional ratings
Review scores
Source	Rating
The Arts Desk	5/5 stars
Louder Than War	4/5 stars

Play Dusty for Me is the second solo album by English singer and songwriter David Westlake.

== Recording ==
Play Dusty for Me was recorded over two days in August 2001 in Kilkenny, Ireland. The album was produced by Cormac Moore.

This was Westlake’s first recording since The Servants’ second album, Small Time. Small Time was recorded in 1991 but was not released until 2012, following the inclusion of 1990’s Disinterest in Mojo’s 2011 list of the greatest British indie records of all time. Throughout this time – “quietly in the background, occasionally in public” – Westlake carried on writing and performing. He wrote the songs on Play Dusty for Me between 1998 and 2001.

== Release history ==
Play Dusty for Me (Mahlerphone, 2002) was a self-pressed album released in a limited issue that quickly sold out. The album was reissued in 2010 and 2015; Cherry Red Records reissued it digitally in 2026. A 2026 review noted that Play Dusty for Me “has spent much of its existence hovering at the margins: briefly available here, quietly reissued there, never quite receiving the audience its quality demanded.”

The cover of the original 2002 issue and British reissues of Play Dusty for Me are in plain black and white. A 2015 American reissue for Record Store Day 2015 had a pink cover.

In 2008, Westlake gave “My Ice Queen”, not included on the original issue, to a charity compilation for the benefit of Yorkhill Children's Foundation, based at the Royal Hospital for Sick Children, Glasgow.

== Reception ==
Kieron Tyler at The Arts Desk describes Play Dusty for Me as “deeply engaging, [...] distinctive, manifestly great”. The album, he says, is “guitar-centred pop at its most lean, most understated”, with an arresting musical range: from “icy” and “crepuscular” compositions to the “gentle bossa nova sway” of “Song For John” – “seemingly an elegy for John Lennon”.

Neil Davenport at Louder Than War finds Play Dusty for Me to be among those records seeming to “drift through the cracks, half-glimpsed and half-heard, gathering a quiet mythology among those lucky enough to find them.” He says “Life On The Edge” offers the album’s “most immediate pop thrill”, while the psych-rock “I Die For Love” and “Patience” reveal “darker currents beneath the record’s composed exterior.”

The album is reviewed on The Big Takeover as "winsome, quiet," and is distinguished by its slow pace, being more concerned with artistic value than commercial value.

A review of Westlake’s next album, My Beautiful England, contrasts the later record’s “fierce and unexpected urgency” [...] with the “dimly-lit beauty” of Play Dusty for Me.

== Track listing ==
Original self-pressing

1. “Play Dusty for Me” – 3:30
2. “Song for John” – 2:02
3. “Back on Track” – 4:28
4. “An Ocean Away” – 3:50
5. “Say When” – 2:51
6. “Stupid Love” – 3:33
7. “The Lonely City” – 2:34
8. “I Can’t Give You the Life You Want” – 3:38
9. “Nowhere Days” – 3:03
10. “I Die for Love” – 3:40
11. “Patience” – 4:40
12. “Even If” – 4:22
13. “Life on the Edge” – 3:44
14. “Hi You” – 3:55
15. “Life Goes On” – 4:20

Reissues

1. “Play Dusty for Me” – 3:30
2. “Song for John” – 2:02
3. “Back on Track” – 4:28
4. “An Ocean Away” – 3:50
5. “Say When” – 2:51
6. “I Can’t Give You the Life You Want” – 3:38
7. “The Lonely City” – 2:34
8. “Life on the Edge” – 3:44
9. “I Die for Love” – 3:40
10. “My Ice Queen” – 4:07
11. “Nowhere Days” – 3:03
12. “Stupid Love” – 3:33
13. “Life Goes On” – 4:20
14. “Hi You” – 3:55
15. “Even If” – 4:22
16. “Patience” – 4:40

== Personnel ==
- David Westlake – vocals and guitar
- Dan Cross – guitar
- Cormac Moore – bass
- Willis Moore – drums

=== Technical personnel ===
- Cormac Moore – production
- Del Sozou – artwork, design
