= The Servants =

English band

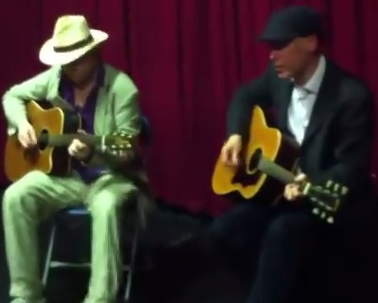
- London, 2014

Background information
- Origin: Hayes, Middlesex, England
- Genres: Indie rock, art rock
- Years active: 1985–1991, 2014
- Label: Cherry Red Records
- Past members: David Westlake; Luke Haines; Andy Bennett; Phil King; Eamon Lynam; John Mohan; Ed Moran; Alice Readman; Hugh Whitaker; John Wills
- Website: lost-sheep.com/ davidwestlake

The Servants were an indie band formed in 1985 in Hayes, Middlesex, England by mainstay singer/songwriter David Westlake.

Luke Haines joined shortly after the band appeared on the NME's C86 compilation. The Servants recorded two albums before the band split in 1991. The second album went unreleased until 2012.

== History ==
=== 1985–1986: C86 ===
Singer-songwriter David Westlake started the band in Hayes, Middlesex with school-friend Ed Moran. He named the band after 1963 film The Servant. The Servants' first gig was on 1 July 1985, opening for Television Personalities at The Pindar of Wakefield (later The Water Rats) in London's King's Cross.

The band "exuded a standoffish, unique quality, distancing themselves from the indie scene". They released first single "She's Always Hiding" (Head, 1986) after declining offers from Statik, Stiff, and Él. A "treacle-thick, reverb-heavy" Peel session followed. NME's Neil Taylor approved of the songs: "There is a timeless quality to them, and while they sit comfortably with the work of some of Westlake's revivalist contemporaries, they are unique, crisp and contemporary."

The Servants' reluctant appearance on the NME's C86 compilation (with "She's Always Hiding"'s B-side, "Transparent") "broadened their audience [...] and made them synonymous with the movement that followed." The NME arranged a C86 "Cool in the Spool" gig-week at the Institute of Contemporary Arts on The Mall, London, 21-25 July 1986. The Servants played on Wednesday 23 July 1986, on the same night as Primal Scream and The Wedding Present. Reviewing for Melody Maker, Sorrel Downer thought Westlake showed "worried charisma"; she praised "The Sun, A Small Star", which the band subsequently recorded for a second single (Head, 1986).

=== 1987–1989: Luke Haines ===
The Servants line-up Westlake had at the time of C86 drifted apart when record label Head dropped the band: "They were all nice people but we weren't particularly on the same wavelength. That happens." Luke Haines arrived in December 1986 via an NME ad. In 2023, Haines looked back on joining The Servants:

David could have very specific ideas about what the lead guitar – i.e. me – should be playing, and at first, I was a bit put out by this, but then I kind of got into it, and I thought "this is good" because he had really good ideas and I enjoy the company of people that are kind of on the same wavelength. Bands don't have to be democratic.

Westlake's 1987 album for Creation Records was "a way station on the way to a reactivated Servants": he continued searching for a permanent line-up, of which Haines would be part. Some notable musicians helped out. Members of The Go-Betweens played on a BBC radio session (and second single "The Sun, A Small Star"); members of The Triffids (and later, The Bad Seeds) played on the 1987 Creation record.

Drummer Hugh Whitaker – "from the pop charts" – was sufficiently taken with the music that he left The Housemartins (after a Number One single and a Top Five album) and played drums in The Servants, from June 1987 to August 1989. Haines recalled in 2006: "Hugh feels his band have become too big. He offers his services to the Servants. He has made the right decision. David and I loathe the Housemartins but Hugh is alright and plays the drums like a demon." The drummer was subsequently No. 7 on The Guardian's list of music's ten authentically "Most Dangerous", in connection with matters arising in 1993. He was placed higher than Derek and the Dominos drummer Jim Gordon (No. 10).

One writer said in 2023: "Why Creation Records didn't pick up The Servants – they ended up on another label – after [the 1987 record] remains an unanswered question. Westlake had an answer: "We were mismatched. We didn't fit in. I know I didn't. [...] I wasn't pretending to be in the MC5."

The Servants moved to Glass Records, who invited the band to record an album. Plans were made to go into the studio with John Brand, producer of Hayes punk band The Ruts. At the eleventh hour, the band was told that Glass distributors Red Rhino had "gone bust". The recording budget was slashed.

Third Servants single "It's My Turn" (recorded 1988; released by Glass Records 1989) was an epic, with a lyric hinting at industry vicissitudes on the way to making the record: "The light at the end of the tunnel is a train headed this way". The band played live to support the record, but Glass delayed releasing it for a year.

=== 1990–1991: Two albums ===
The Servants released debut album Disinterest in July 1990 on Paperhouse Records. Westlake recalled in 2014: "We ended up with the record company for whom we did Disinterest not directly through choice. The album came out of a set of unspeakable frustrations and miscellaneous perversity." The material reflected that: "Sonically and lyrically, the aim was directly to oppose the on-trend music of the time." The record company took The Servants' fourth and final single, "Look Like A Girl", from the album.

Ignored on original release, some twenty years later Mojo disinterred Disinterest, finding it: "Arty, experimental and notable for Westlake's fabulously mordant lyrics." Record Collector said "it's impossible to deny the quirky, Talking Heads: 77-style quality of 'Third Wheel' or the affectingly lovelorn 'Afterglow'."

Westlake and Haines recorded The Servants' second album, Small Time, as a duo in 1991. Even while recording it, they shared a paradoxical intuition: "It's going to be a great album. I think we both know that it will never come out." Not until twenty-one years later – after Mojo exhumed Disinterest – was Small Time released, in 2012 on Cherry Red Records. Tim Peacock at Record Collector said "'Everybody Has A Dream' and the full-tilt 'Don't Leave Town' represent Westlake at his nervy, playful best." Kieron Tyler at Mojo said: Small Time "reveals the twilight-time Servants as musicians with no contemporary context or peers [...] It's a sound and style that has to be heard, from a unique band that merits an instant reappraisal."

The Servants' last gig was at the Rock Garden, London WC2 on 21 August 1991 – "With no room to manoeuvre and no opportunities left", the band finally called it a day.

== Twenty-first century ==
Cherry Red Records released a 2006 retrospective of The Servants, called Reserved. The compilation features all of the releases prior to the first album plus Peel session tracks and demos. More reissues followed. The "brilliantly-titled" Hey Hey We're the Manqués (Cherry Red, 2012) is a seventeen-track album released at the same time as Small Time, containing demos and rehearsal versions of first-album material.

Westlake and Haines played live together for the first time in twenty-three years at The Lexington, London N1 on 4 May 2014. Haines plays guitar on Westlake's 2022 album My Beautiful England.

Optic Nerve Recordings' 2019 reissue of first single "She's Always Hiding" made the UK Vinyl Singles Chart (reaching No. 35, w/c 21 May 2021).

== David Westlake solo ==
First solo album Westlake (Creation Records, 1987) would have been The Servants' debut had it not been for the lack of a full-time rhythm section; Optic Nerve Recordings reissued it as D87 in 2023. Westlake self-pressed second solo album Play Dusty for Me (Mahlerphone, 2002). Third solo album My Beautiful England (Tiny Global Productions, 2022) appeared twenty years after Play Dusty for Me. Clearly, "Taking his time seems endemic". Cherry Red Records reissued both Play Dusty for Me and My Beautiful England in 2026.

== Legacy ==
Writing in 2014, Evan Sawdey at PopMatters may have intended a general point about C86 being part of the ancestry of Britpop by his hyperbolic suggestion that "the Servants' 'Transparent' is basically the template for every song that Blur ever wrote." Westlake's own verdict on his C86 song was less extravagant: "I always hated 'Transparent'."

In 2011, Mojo magazine included The Servants' 1990 debut album Disinterest in its list of the greatest British indie records of all time.

Luke Haines went on to form The Auteurs. Interviewed about The Auteurs in 2023, Haines said of his earlier experience: "I think with five years in The Servants I learned what being in a band entailed."

Clive Prior at Mojo noted in 2011 that "the [Disinterest] album and the band would prove to be a huge influence on Belle & Sebastian's [...] songwriter Stuart Murdoch."

Writing for Uncut in 2022, Johnny Sharp summed up: "Although The Servants' C86 compilation appearance didn't kickstart a glittering career in indie rock, their chief songwriter David Westlake retains great respect from that era's cognoscenti."

== Discography ==
=== Albums ===
- Disinterest (1990, Paperhouse Records)
- Reserved (compilation; 2006, Cherry Red Records; reissued in reduced form as Youth Club Disco, 2011)
- Small Time/Hey Hey We’re the Manqués (2012, Cherry Red Records)
- Entrance – The C86 Line-up Singles (compilation; 2026, Cherry Red Records)

David Westlake solo

- D87 a.k.a. Westlake (1987, Creation Records; Optic Nerve Recordings expanded issue, 2023)
- Play Dusty for Me (2002, Mahlerphone; reissued 2026)
- My Beautiful England (2022, Tiny Global Productions; reissued 2026)

=== Singles ===
- "She's Always Hiding" (1986, Head: 7"; reissued 2021)
- "The Sun, a Small Star" (1986, Head: 12"; reissued 2019: 7")
- "It's My Turn" (1989, Glass Records: 7" & 12")
- "Look Like a Girl" (1990, Paperhouse Records: 7")
