= I Am the Greatest =

"I am the greatest" is a catch-phrase of American boxer Muhammad Ali.

I Am the Greatest or I'm the Greatest may refer to:

- I Am the Greatest: The Adventures of Muhammad Ali, a cartoon television series featuring (and voiced by) Muhammad Ali
- I Am the Greatest (Cassius Clay album) (1963), or its title song
- I Am the Greatest (A House album) (1991)
- "I'm the Greatest", a 1973 song by Ringo Starr from Ringo
- "I Am The Greatest", a 1966 song by Spitfire from Electric Colour Climax
- "I'm The Greatest", a song by Eric Morris and Buster's All Stars
- "I'm The Greatest", a 1972 song by Old Shatterhand
- "I'm The Greatest", a 1964 song by Ross McManus and the Joe Loss
- "I Am the Greatest", a 2015 song by Logic on the album The Incredible True Story
