= My Beautiful England =

Studio album by David Westlake
- Released: 14 October 2022
- Recorded: June 2021
- Genre: Indie rock
- Length: 39:18
- Language: English
- Label: Tiny Global Productions
- Producer: Des Lambert

David Westlake chronology
Play Dusty for Me (2002)	My Beautiful England (2022)

Singles from My Beautiful England
- 1. "Bethnal Green Museum of Childhood" Released: 15 July 2022; 2. "Mallory Kept Climbing the Mountain" Released: 16 September 2022

Professional ratings
Review scores
Source	Rating
Uncut	8/10
Louder Than War	5/5 stars

My Beautiful England is the third solo studio album by English singer/songwriter David Westlake, released through Tiny Global Productions on 14 October 2022.

== Recording ==
My Beautiful England was produced by Des Lambert.

In his book Whatever Happened to the C86 Kids?, Nige Tassell notes that My Beautiful England is Westlake’s first all-new album since Play Dusty for Me twenty years ago, and that former Servants bandmate Luke Haines plays guitar on the recording.

== Reception ==
Writing for Uncut, Johnny Sharp rated the album eight-out-of-ten, calling it “a delight”. “Westlake retains great respect from [the C86] era’s cognoscenti”, he said, and My Beautiful England is “a Britpop concept album from a man who’d surely wince at either label”.

In an in-depth review for Louder Than War, Neil Davenport gave the album a five-out-of-five rating, calling it “one of the most idiosyncratic, political and blazingly tuneful guitar pop albums [of 2022]”. “It’s an extraordinary record”, he says, “a contemporary update on George Orwell’s critiques of left intelligentsia found in ‘England Your England’.” “This is high level stuff”, says Davenport; “Not since Malcom Eden’s old band McCarthy (but in a completely different historical context) has there been an attempt to intelligently challenge received wisdom.” Musically, “My Beautiful England simply triumphs as a consistently great, 14-song guitar pop album. It’s packed with some of Westlake’s best songs.”

Different shows on BBC Radio 6 Music and other BBC stations gave the album regular airplay for several months around its release.

== Track listing ==
Side one:

1. "My Beautiful England" – 4:24
2. "War Memorial" – 3:05
3. "The Modern Ruins of Old London Town" – 3:20
4. "Bethnal Green Museum of Childhood" – 3:23
5. "Mallory Kept Climbing the Mountain" – 2:25
6. "E is for the Empire" – 2:38

Side two:

1. "Hayes, Middlesex" – 1:59
2. "English Parish Churches" – 3:37
3. "Regency Terrace" – 2:24
4. "Marie Lloyd" – 2:20
5. "The Crusades" – 2:31
6. "The Age of Unenlightenment" – 2:17
7. "General Gordon’s Last Stand" – 2:38
8. "Au Contraire, Tony Blair" – 2:11

== Personnel ==
- David Westlake – vocals and guitar
- Luke Haines – guitar
- Des Lambert – bass
- Rob Flanagan – drums
- Dwain Bedford – trumpet

=== Technical personnel ===
- Des Lambert – production
- Stuart Moxham – mastering
- Patsy Westlake – photography
- Del Sozou – artwork, design
