= The Last Great Wilderness (album) =

Soundtrack album by The Pastels
- Released: 12 August 2003
- Genre: Soundtrack, art rock
- Length: 24:19
- Label: Geographic/Domino
- Producer: John McEntire, The Pastels

The Pastels chronology
Illumination (1997)	The Last Great Wilderness (2003)	Two Sunsets (2009)

Professional ratings
Review scores
Source	Rating
AllMusic	link

The Last Great Wilderness is a soundtrack album by the Scottish band The Pastels, containing music from the film The Last Great Wilderness.

== Overview ==
The music comprises mostly short and atmospheric pieces, while three of the songs ("Winter Driving," "Flora's Theme," and "Flora Again") are brief fragments of eerie vocal loops and bells. Along with a cover of Sly and the Family Stone's "Everybody Is a Star" (which had previously appeared on a Geographic label compilation in 2002), the only other track to feature a lead vocal line is "I Picked a Flower", which is credited to The Nu Forest featuring Jarvis Cocker and The Pastels.

== Track listing ==
All tracks are written by Stephen McRobbie and Katrina Mitchell, except where noted.

No.	Title	Writer(s)	Length
1.	"Wilderness Theme"		2:46
2.	"Winter Driving"		1:04
3.	"Vincente’s Theme"		2:47
4.	"Flora’s Theme"		0:37
5.	"Charlie’s Theme"		3:02
6.	"Everybody Is a Star"	Sylvester Stewart	2:58
7.	"Flora Again"		0:54
8.	"Dark Vincente"		3:02
9.	"Wilderness End Theme"		3:35
10.	"I Picked a Flower" (feat. Jarvis Cocker)	McRobbie, Mitchell, Cocker	3:34

== Personnel ==
- Stephen McRobbie (or Stephen Pastel) – guitar, keyboards, vocals
- Katrina Mitchell – drums, vocals, percussion, keyboards
- Bill Wells – guitar
- Colin McIlroy – guitar
- Gerard Love – guitar
- Allison Mitchell – trumpet
- Tom Crossley – vocals
- Richard Hawley – guitar
- Jarvis Cocker – vocals
- Annabel Wright – artwork
