= Morning Dove White =

1993 album by One Dove

Studio album by One Dove
- Released: 19 October 1993
- Genre: Electronic, house, downtempo, dub
- Length: 66:39
- Label: Boy's Own Productions
- Producer: Andrew Weatherall; One Dove; Stephen Hague

Singles from Morning Dove White
- 1. "Fallen" Released: 1991; 2. "Transient Truth" Released: 1992; 3. "White Love" Released: 1993; 4. "Breakdown" Released: 1993; 5. "Why Don't You Take Me" Released: 1993

Morning Dove White is the only studio album by Scottish electronic music group One Dove. It was originally released on Boy's Own Productions in 1993. The group primarily co-produced the album with Andrew Weatherall, with Stephen Hague later being recruited to assist with additional production and remixing.

Morning Dove White peaked at number 30 on the UK Albums Chart. The album includes three singles which appeared on the UK Singles Chart: "White Love" (No. 43), "Breakdown" (No. 24), and "Why Don't You Take Me" (No. 30).

== Critical reception ==
Professional ratings
Review scores
| Source | Rating |
|---|---|
| AllMusic | 4/5 stars |
| NME | 6/10 |
| Pitchfork | 8.7/10 |
| Select | 4/5 |

Reviewing Morning Dove White in 1993, Rupert Howe of Select found that One Dove's more developed songwriting set them apart from their peers in the house music scene: "Stripped of their backing, these songs are the stuff you end up humming in the bath, with melodies that linger in the mind rather than passing through it". Frank Owen of Vibe described the group as "the best and brightest hope of the U.K. rave scene, providing a needed dose of individual glamor and pop perfection in a community that, until recently, shunned such things". NME critic Stephen Dalton was less receptive, finding that the record suffered by comparison to Weatherall's work on Primal Scream's Screamadelica (1991), despite appraising One Dove as "potentially the best post-rave pop act in Britain". The Village Voice's Robert Christgau dismissed the album apart from the track "White Love (Guitar Paradise Mix)", which he named a "choice cut".

In a retrospective review, Ned Raggett of AllMusic wrote that "Dot Allison's singing, informed with everything from Siouxsie Sioux's cool clip to Dolly Parton's rich passion ... is simply marvelous, while the blend of influences in the musicians' work ranges as well from dub's deep echo to epic metal noise." In 2017, Mixmag included the album on its list of "10 Slept-On Albums That Should Have Been Absolutely Huge". Joe Muggs wrote, "The music of Glaswegian trio Allison, Ian Carmichael and Jim McKinven was the ultimate expression of the bittersweet collapse of the comedown, and was a morning-after staple for those who knew."

=== Accolades ===
Accolades for Morning Dove White
| Publication | Accolade | Rank | Ref. |
|---|---|---|---|
| The Face | Albums of the Year | 7 | |
| Melody Maker | Albums of the Year | 16 | |
| Select | Albums of the Year | 2 | |

== Track listing ==
All tracks are written by Dot Allison, Ian Carmichael and Jim McKinven, except where noted.

UK CD edition
| No. | Title | Writer(s) | Length |
|---|---|---|---|
| 1. | "Fallen" | | 7:18 |
| 2. | "White Love" (Guitar Paradise Mix) | | 10:16 |
| 3. | "Breakdown" (Cellophane Boat Mix) | | 6:39 |
| 4. | "There Goes the Cure" | | 8:03 |
| 5. | "Sirens" | | 6:34 |
| 6. | "My Friend" | Allison; Carmichael; McKinven; Andrew Weatherall | 5:54 |
| 7. | "Transient Truth" | | 7:00 |
| 8. | "Why Don't You Take Me" | | 3:40 |
| 9. | "White Love" (Piano Reprise) | | 1:09 |
| 10. | "Breakdown" (Radio Mix) | | 5:32 |
| 11. | "White Love" (Radio Mix) | | 4:40 |
| Total length: | | | 66:39 |

US CD edition
| No. | Title | Writer(s) | Length |
|---|---|---|---|
| 1. | "Fallen" | | 7:18 |
| 2. | "White Love" (Guitar Paradise Mix) | | 10:16 |
| 3. | "Breakdown" (Cellophane Boat Mix) | | 6:39 |
| 4. | "There Goes the Cure" | | 8:03 |
| 5. | "Sirens" | | 6:34 |
| 6. | "(The Transient) Truth" | | 7:00 |
| 7. | "My Friend" | Allison; Carmichael; McKinven; Weatherall | 9:04 |
| 8. | "Why Don't You Take Me" | | 3:40 |
| 9. | "White Love" (Piano Reprise) | | 1:09 |
| 10. | "White Love" (Radio Mix) | | 4:40 |
| 11. | "Breakdown" (Radio Mix) | | 5:32 |
| Total length: | | | 69:42 |

- "Breakdown" (Radio Mix) and "White Love" (Radio Mix) do not appear on the vinyl version.

== Personnel ==
One Dove

- Dot Allison – vocals
- Jim McKinven – guitar, bass guitar, keyboards, programming
- Ian Carmichael – keyboards, programming

Additional musicians

- Eddie Higgins – drums (1), percussion (1), percussion loop (3, 10)
- Jagz Kooner – additional drums (2, 4–9, 11), additional percussion (2, 4–9, 11)
- Phil Mossman – guitar (2, 8)
- Andrew Innes – guitar (3, 10)
- Jah Wobble – bass guitar (4)
- Tom Baeppler – guitar (5)
- Gary Burns – guitar (6, 7), Hammond organ (5), piano (9), additional programming (2, 4–9, 11)

Technical personnel

- Andrew Weatherall – production
- One Dove – production
- Hugo Nicholson – engineering (1, 3), mixing (1, 3)
- Gary Burns – engineering (2, 4–9), mixing (2, 4–9)
- Jagz Kooner – engineering (2, 4–9), mixing (2, 4–9)
- Stephen Hague – additional production (10, 11), remix (10, 11)
- Gary Wilkinson – engineering (10, 11)
- Chris Clunn – photography

== Charts ==
Chart performance for Morning Dove White
| Chart (1993) | Peak position |
|---|---|
| UK Albums (OCC) | 30 |
