= Boink (album) =

1986 compilation album by the Replacements

Boink!!

Compilation album by the Replacements
- Released: April 1986
- Genre: Punk rock
- Length: 24:08
- Label: Glass

The Replacements chronology
| The Shit Hits the Fans (1985) | Boink!! (1986) | Pleased to Meet Me (1987) |

Professional ratings
Review scores
| Source | Rating |
|---|---|
| AllMusic | 3/5 stars |
| The New Rolling Stone Album Guide | 4/5 stars |

Boink!! is a rare 1986 album by the Replacements. It was released in the UK on Glass Records. who requested, "File under: Power trash" on the spine of the LP.

The album contains songs previously released on the album Hootenany and the EP Stink. Also on the album are "If Only You Were Lonely" (B-Side of the "I'm in Trouble" single) and a previously unreleased track titled "Nowhere Is My Home," produced by Alex Chilton.

== Track listing ==
All tracks are written by Paul Westerberg.

Side 1
| No. | Title | Original appearance | Length |
|---|---|---|---|
| 1. | "Color Me Impressed" | Hootenanny | 2:26 |
| 2. | "White and Lazy" | Stink | 2:06 |
| 3. | "Within Your Reach" | Hootenanny | 4:25 |
| 4. | "If Only You Were Lonely" | "I'm in Trouble" single | 2:32 |

Side 2
| No. | Title | Original appearance | Length |
|---|---|---|---|
| 5. | "Kids Don't Follow" | Stink | 2:18 |
| 6. | "Nowhere Is My Home" | Previously unreleased | 4:08 |
| 7. | "Take Me Down to the Hospital" | Hootenanny | 3:47 |
| 8. | "Go" | Stink | 2:28 |
| Total length: | | | 24:08 |

== Personnel ==
- Chris Mars – drums
- Bob Stinson – guitar
- Tommy Stinson – bass
- Paul Westerberg – vocals, guitar
