= Tenniscoats =

Japanese avant-garde folk duo

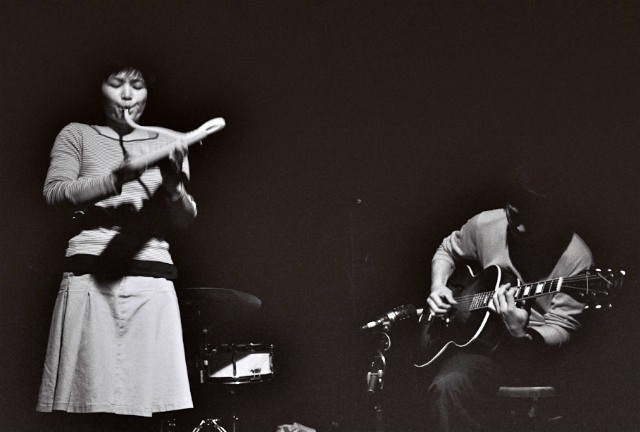
In performance, June 2009

Tenniscoats is a Japanese band with two members, Saya & Takashi Ueno, but they often have guest musicians (and non-musicians) playing and performing with them. The guest musicians are for example, Secai, LSD March, Eddie Marcon, Popo, Saibou Bungaku, Tetsuya Umeda, Kazumi Nikaido, etc. Saya and Takashi have also performed in many other underground bands, such as Maher Shalal Hash Baz, Cacoy, Puka Puka Brians, Yumbo and others. Saya and Takashi have also released solo works.

Their music has been classified as avant-garde, folk, psychedelic and indie; Saya herself has been known to label their sound, "avant pops".

Saya and Takashi met at Meiji University, where they were students.

In December, 2008, Saya collaborated with Satomi of Deerhoof on a one-off project called OneOne. The album was released on P-Vine Records (Japan) and Aquarius Records (United States).

In 2009, Takashi began the psych-folk group, Kasumi Trio. The other members are Shinsuke Michishita (from LSD March), Ikuro Takahashi (from Fushitsusha, Nagisa ni te).

In 2016 they played on a small festival - Alien Disko - in Munich which was managed by members of The Notwist. Together with Markus Acher of The Notwist they founded a new band Spirit Fest which is playing very silent, melancholic English and Japanese songs.

== Discography ==
- The Theme of Tenniscoats (2000)
- The Ending Theme (2002)
- We Are Everyone (2004)
- Live Wanderus (2005)
- Totemo Aimasho (2007)
- Tan-Tan Therapy (2008) - Collaboration with Tape
- Tenniscoats & Secai (2008)
- Temporacha (2009)
- Two Sunsets (2009, Domino Records) - Collaboration with The Pastels
- Tokinouta (2011)
- Papa's Ear (2012)
- All Aboard! (2012, Chapter Music) - Collaboration with Ikuro Takahashi
- Yaki-Läki (2013, Õunaviks Records) - Collaboration with Pastacas
- Healthy in California (2015, Lotushouse Records) - Collaboration with Maquiladora
