= Jacobites (band) =

English rock band

- Origin: England
- Genres: Indie rock; alternative rock; roots rock; jangle pop; post-punk
- Years active: 1982–2004
- Labels: Mammoth; Glass; What's So Funny About; Bomp! Secretly Canadian; Regency Sound; Glitterhouse; Por Caridad Producciones; Swamp Room Records; Ultra Under Records; Chatterbox
- Past members: Nikki Sudden; Dave Kusworth; Epic Soundtracks; Mark Lemon; Glenn Tranter; Carl Eugene Picôt; Mark Williams; Terry Miles
- Website: http://www.nikkisudden.com/jacobites/

Jacobites were an English rock band formed in Birmingham in 1982 by Nikki Sudden and Dave Kusworth, following the breakup of their respective previous bands, the Swell Maps and the Subterranean Hawks.

== Career ==
The two had met in early 1980, and first performed together in May 1982 under the name Six Hip Princes, but it was not until 1984, after Sudden had already issued two solo releases, that the duo adopted the name Jacobites (after the rebel movement to restore the Stuart line to the British thrones) and completed the lineup by adding Nikki's brother Epic Soundtracks, also formerly of the Swell Maps, and bassist Mark Lemon. The Jacobites were a more traditional, song-oriented outfit than the experimental-punk style of Swell Maps. Sudden and Kusworth were both strongly influenced by The Faces, Bob Dylan, glam rock, and, most vitally, The Rolling Stones. Sudden considered the Stones "the best band there has ever been" and was working on a Ronnie Wood biography at the time of his death. The group's velvet-and-scarves style of dressing and their girls-and-drugs style of living presented a natural comparison with Mick Jagger and Keith Richards.

The group released a string of albums and EPs between 1984 and 1985, garnering increasing critical interest, a certain appreciation in the British underground, and great popularity in Germany, but also began shedding its original members in the latter year – Soundtracks to Crime & the City Solution, Kusworth to a well-regarded but ill-remembered solo career.

With the breakup of the songwriting team at its heart, the Jacobites became little more than a name for the shifting backing unit Sudden used for his solo career. An American compilation was released in 1986 after the band's boozy, weary-eyed brand of romantic songwriting gained the devoted support of the similarly minded Paul Westerberg, and another comp followed in 1988, but the group would not exist again in meaningful form until 1993, when Sudden and Kusworth rejoined forces to recreate the Jacobites with a new lineup that featured Glenn Tranter on guitar, Carl Eugene Picôt on bass, and Mark Williams on drums: all friends from Birmingham. A series of obscure releases followed throughout the mid-1990s, doted upon by the band's cult following, particularly in mainland Europe, but otherwise generally ignored. After God Save Us Poor Sinners appeared in 1998, the Jacobites remained silent while Sudden and Kusworth continued their solo careers. With Sudden's death in 2006, and Kusworth's in 2020, the band is now permanently defunct.

== Discography ==
=== Studio albums ===
- Jacobites (1984)
- Robespierre's Velvet Basement (1985)
- Lost in a Sea of Scarves (1985, What's So Funny About)
- Texas (1986)
- Dead Men Tell No Tales (1987)
- Howling Good Times (1994)
- Old Scarlett (1995)
- God Save Us Poor Sinners (1998) (Two releases with different track lists on Glitterhouse and Bomp! Records)

=== Compilation albums ===
- Lost in a Sea of Scarves (Rarities Collection) (1985)
- The Ragged School (1986)
- Fortune of Fame (Big Hits & Broken Biscuits) (1988)
- Fortune of Fame (Big Hits & Stereo Landings) (1988)
- Heart of Hearts (The Spanish Album) (Rarities Collection) (1995, Spain)
- Hawks Get Religion (1996)

=== Live albums ===
- Kiss of Life (Recorded live in Hanover in 1995, limited edition) (1995)

=== Singles ===
- "Shame for the Angels" 7" / 12" (1984)
- "Pin Your Heart" 12" (1985)
- "When the Rain Comes" 7" / 12" (1986)
- "Don't You Ever Leave Me" CD (1993)
- "Can't You See?" CD (1995)
- "Over & Over" 7" (1997)
- "Teenage Christmas" 7" (1998)
- "The Otter Song" 7" (2011)
