= One Dove =

Scottish electronic music group

- Origin: Glasgow, Scotland
- Genres: Trip hop, alternative dance, ethereal wave
- Years active: 1990–1996
- Labels: Soma Records; FFRR
- Past members: Dot Allison; Ian Carmichael; Jim McKinven

One Dove were a Scottish electronic music group active in the early 1990s, consisting of Dot Allison, Ian Carmichael and Jim McKinven, a former member of Berlin Blondes and Altered Images.

== History ==
Originally called Dove, the group released its debut single, "Fallen", on the Glasgow-based label Soma in October 1991. It was a significant club hit and brought them a deal with the Junior Boy's Own label. Changing their name to avoid confusion with a similarly named group, in 1992 JBO issued a new recording of "Fallen", produced by Andrew Weatherall, which brought the group to greater attention from the British music press. The single was withdrawn one week after release however, due to an unlicensed sampling of a harmonica from a Supertramp song. Further critical acclaim followed with the release of the 12" single "Transient Truth".

At this stage, One Dove were still primarily a club-oriented group, but for the single "White Love", an attempt was made to make their music more radio-friendly by including a commercial remix by Stephen Hague. With this increasingly commercial sound, the band became a favourite with publications such as Select and Q, and were often favourably compared with Saint Etienne, another female-fronted group who were having success with pop-dance crossover recordings.

In 1993, One Dove released their only album, Morning Dove White, which included the Weatherall version of "Fallen" (minus the Supertramp sample) together with 12" mixes of "Transient Truth" and "White Love". The album was originally set for release in 1992 but was delayed for a full year through disputes between the band and their new record company - London Records had taken over the Boy's Own label. The band were unhappy about the commercialisation of their sound, and the disputes were only resolved when the band agreed to release singles mixed by Stephen Hague, if they could work with him in the studio during the remix sessions.

The album was preceded by the single "Breakdown", with remixes by Stephen Hague, William Orbit and Secret Knowledge and a further track from the album, "Why Don't You Take Me", was subsequently released as a single for the Christmas market. For the B-sides of the "Why Don't You Take Me" single (which included a reworking of Dolly Parton's song "Jolene"), the group expanded to a five-piece with the addition of Ed Higgins on percussion and Colin McIlroy on guitar, and showcased a more heavily dub-influenced sound. This line-up later went into the studio to begin work on a second album, but frustrated by record industry politics, split up midway through the sessions.

== Discography ==
=== Albums ===
- Morning Dove White (No. 30 UK, 1993)

=== Singles ===
- "Fallen" (released by Dove, 1991)
- "Fallen" (released by One Dove, 1991)
- "Transient Truth" (1992)
- "White Love" (No. 43 UK, July 1993; No. 14 US Modern Rock, December 1993)
- "Breakdown" (No. 24 UK, October 1993)
- "Why Don't You Take Me" (No. 30 UK, December 1993)
