= Paperhouse Records =

British record label

- Founded: 1990
- Founder: David E. Barker; Clive Solomon
- Defunct: 1993
- Distributor: Pinnacle
- Genre: Indie; Art rock
- Country of origin: United Kingdom
- Location: London

Paperhouse Records was a British independent record label which operated from 1990 to 1993.

The label was a short-lived joint venture by Glass Records owner David E. Barker and Fire Records owner Clive Solomon. It is named after "Paperhouse", opening track on Tago Mago, the 1971 album by Krautrock band Can.

Paperhouse issued Richard Hell's Dim Stars material, and records by Teenage Fanclub and other bands connected with Creation Records (The Pastels, The Servants). The label also issued material by the Kurt Cobain-championed Daniel Johnston.

== Paperhouse Records discography ==
Albums may be in LP (PAPLP), compact disc (PAPCD), or cassette (PAPMC) format, with singles listed with variations on the PAPER prefix. Artefacts with the same title under different catalogue entries refer to the same recording, if releases were not always issued in more than one format, leading to apparent gaps in the series.

Catalogue number	Artist	Title	Year
PAPCD 001	Walkingseeds	Bad Orb.. Whirling Ball (CD, Album)	1990
PAPCD 002	Phil Shoenfelt	Backwoods Crucifixion (CD, Album)	1990
PAPCD 004	Teenage Fanclub	A Catholic Education (CD, Album)	1990
PAPCD 005	The Servants	Disinterest (CD, Album)	1990
PAPCD 006	The Pastels	Up for a Bit with The Pastels (CD, Album)	1991
PAPCD 007	Gumball	Special Kiss (CD, Album)	1991
PAPCD 008	The Pastels	Truckload of Trouble (CD, Comp)	1993
PAPCD 009	Jad Fair	I Like It When You Smile (CD, Album)	1992
PAPCD 10	Half Japanese	Fire in the Sky (CD, Album)	1992
PAPCD 011	Eugenius	Oomalama (CD, Album)	1992
PAPCD 012	The Badgeman	Ritual Landscape (CD, Album)	1992
PAPCD 014	Dim Stars	Dim Stars (CD, Album)	1992
PAPCD 15	Jad And Nao	Half Robot (CD)	1992
PAPCD 17	Half Japanese	Music To Strip By (CD, Album, RE)	1993
PAPCD 18	Half Japanese	The Band That Would Be King (CD, RE, Album)	1993
PAPCD19	Jad Fair & Daniel Johnston	It's Spooky (CD, Album, RE)	1993
PAPCD21	Spitfire	Sex Bomb (CD, Album)	1993
PAPER 001	Walkingseeds	Gates of Freedom (7")	1990
PAPER 002	The Badgeman	Crystals (7")	1990
PAPER 003	Teenage Fanclub	Everything Flows/Primary Education/Speeder (7")	1990
PAPER 003CD	Teenage Fanclub	Everything Flows (CD, Single)	1991
PAPER 004	The Servants	Look Like A Girl (7", EP)	1990
PAPER 005	Teenage Fanclub	The Ballad of John And Yoko (7", S/Sided)	1990
PAPER 006T	Gumball	Gumball (12", EP)	1990
PAPER 007	Teenage Fanclub	God Knows It's True (7", Single)	1990
PAPER 007CD	Teenage Fanclub	God Knows It's True (CD, Single)	1990
PAPER 007T	Teenage Fanclub	God Knows It's True (12")	1990
PAPER 008	The Pastels	Speeding Motorcycle (7", Single)	1991
PAPER 008CD	The Pastels	Speeding Motorcycle (CD, EP)	1991
PAPER 008T	The Pastels	Speeding Motorcycle/Speedway Star (12", EP)	1991
PAPER010	Gumball	This Town/Summer Days (7")	1991
PAPER 011	The Pastels	Thru' Your Heart (Maxi)	1991
PAPER 011T	The Pastels	Thru' Your Heart (12", EP, Single)	1991
PAPER 012CD	Gumball	Light Shines Through (CD, Maxi)	1991
PAPER 012T	Gumball	Light Shines Through (12")	1991
PAPER 013CD	Jad Fair & The Pastels	This Could Be The Night (CD, Maxi)	1992
PAPER 013T	Jad Fair & The Pastels	This Could Be The Night (12")	1992
PAPER 014CD	Captain America	Captain America EP (CD, EP)	1991
PAPER 014T	Captain America	Captain America EP (12", EP)	1991
PAPER 015CD	Dim Stars	Dim Stars EP (CD, EP)	1991
PAPER 015T	Dim Stars	Dim Stars EP (12", Mini-album)	1992
PAPER 016CD	Captain America	Flame On (CD, Single)	1992
PAPER 016T	Captain America	Flame On (12")	1992
PAPER 017	Half Japanese	Eye of the Hurricane (7")	1992
PAPER 018CD	Jad Fair & The Pastels	Jad Fair & The Pastels No. 2 (CD, Maxi)	1992
PAPER 018T	Jad Fair & The Pastels	Jad Fair & The Pastels No. 2 (12")	1992
PAPER 019	The Badgeman	English Road Song (7", Single)	1992
PAPER 020	Midway Still/Captain America	Wow!/I Won't Try (7")	1992
PAPER 021CD	The Nightblooms	Butterfly Girl (CD, Maxi)	1992
PAPER 022	Kittenbirds	You, Me And Jesus (7", Single)	1993
PAPER 022CD	Kittenbirds	You, Me And Jesus (CD, Maxi)	1993
PAPER 023	The Pastels	Thank You For Being You (Single)	1993
PAPER 023CD	The Pastels	Thank You For Being You (CD, Single)	1993
PAPER 024	Kittenbirds	Honey, You're Sick (7", Single)	1993
PAPER 025CD	Spitfire	Minimal Love EP (CD, EP)	1993
PAPER 025T	Spitfire	Minimal Love EP (12")	1993
PAPLP 001	Walkingseeds	Bad Orb.. Whirling Ball (LP, Album)	1990
PAPLP 002	Phil Shoenfelt	Backwoods Crucifixion (LP, Album)	1990
PAPLP 003	The Badgeman	Kings of the Desert (LP)	1990
PAPLP 004	Teenage Fanclub	A Catholic Education (LP, Album)	1990
PAPLP 005	The Servants	Disinterest (LP, Album)	1990
PAPLP 006	The Pastels	Up for a Bit with The Pastels (Album)	1991
PAPLP 007	Gumball	Special Kiss (LP, Album)	1991
PAPLP 007S	Gumball	Special Kiss (LP, Album, Ltd)	1991
PAPLP 008	The Pastels	Truckload of Trouble (2xLP, Comp)	1993
PAPLP 009	Jad Fair	I Like It When You Smile (LP)	1992
PAPLP 010	Half Japanese	Fire in the Sky (12", Album)	1992
PAPLP 011	Eugenius	Oomalama (LP, Album)	1992
PAPLP 012	The Badgeman	Ritual Landscape (LP, Album)	1992
PAPLP 014	Dim Stars	Dim Stars (LP)	1992
PAPLP 021	Spitfire	Sex Bomb (LP, Whi)	1993
PAPMC 004	Teenage Fanclub	A Catholic Education (Cass, Album)	1990
PAPMC 011	Eugenius	Oomalama (Cass, Album)	1992

== See also ==
- Lists of record labels
- List of independent UK record labels
