= Truckload of Trouble =

Truckload Of Trouble

Compilation album by the Pastels
- Released: 1993
- Recorded: 1986–1993
- Genres: Indie pop, indie rock, alternative rock
- Length: 62:04
- Label: Paperhouse

The Pastels chronology
Sittin' Pretty (1989)	Truckload Of Trouble (1993)	Mobile Safari (1995)

Truckload Of Trouble is a compilation album by the Pastels, released in 1993. The album compiles songs from their EPs and singles released between 1986 and 1993, with some popular album tracks. Included are well known songs such as "Comin' Through", "Nothing to be Done", "Truck Train Tractor", "Crawl Babies", "Speeding Motorcycle" and "Baby Honey".

== Critical reception ==
Professional ratings
Review scores
Source	Rating
AllMusic	4.5/5 stars

Trouser Press called the compilation "not simply a useful introduction to the Pastels, [but] also a handy seven-year stack of nifty 45s by a casually exceptional singles band." Reviewing the 2005 reissue, Exclaim! wrote that "tracks culled from [the band's] late '80s golden period (especially the mighty 'Comin' Through') are the highest of this hour of highlights."

== Track listing ==
1. "Thank You for Being You"
2. "Thru' Your Heart"
3. "Firebell Ringing"
4. "Kitted Out"
5. "Comin' Through"
6. "Over My Shoulder"
7. "Truck Train Tractor"
8. "Crawl Babies"
9. "Nothing to Be Done"
10. "Different Drum" (Michael Nesmith)
11. "Not Unloved"
12. "Baby Honey"
13. "Speeding Motorcycle" (Daniel Johnston)
14. "Speedway Star"
15. "What You Said"
16. "Dark Side of Your World"
17. "Sometimes I Think About You"
18. "Sign Across Me"

Notes

- Tracks 1, 4 and 17 originally released on the 1993 single "Thank You for Being You"
- Tracks 2, 3 and 18 originally released on the 1991 single "Thru' Your Heart"
- Tracks 5, 6 and 11 originally released on the 1987 single "Comin' Through"
- Track 7 originally released as a single in 1986
- Track 8 originally released as a single in 1987, a different recording from the album version
- Track 9 originally released on the 1989 album Sittin' Pretty
- Track 10 originally released as a single in 1990
- Tracks 13 and 14 originally released on the 1991 single "Speeding Motorcycle"
- Track 15 previously unreleased
- Track 16 originally released on the 1992 No 2 EP (with Jad Fair)

"Baby Honey", "Speedway Star" and "Not Unloved" are re-recorded versions as opposed to the original versions. This compilation is the third time they have recorded "Baby Honey" for a studio release, having previously done so in both 1984 (for their "Million Tears" single) and 1986 (for their first album, Up for a Bit with the Pastels). They have also recorded it twice for the BBC. Several songs have also been slightly remixed.

The single version of "Crawl Babies" that is included is also a different recording from the version on Up for a Bit, with a more jangly guitar tone and a much faster tempo. It is also slightly longer.

== Personnel ==
- Stephen McRobbie (or Stephen Pastel) – guitar, vocals
- Katrina Mitchell – drums, vocals, percussion, keyboards, guitar
- Annabel Wright (or Aggi) – bass guitar, vocals, keyboards, artwork
- Brian Taylor (or Brian Superstar) – guitar
- Martin Hayward – bass guitar, vocals
- Bernice Simpson – drums
- David Keegan – guitar
- Francis McDonald – drums
- Eugene Kelly – vocals, violin, autoharp
- Norman Blake – vocals
