= Slow Summits =

Studio album by the Pastels
- Released: 27 May 2013
- Recorded: 2010–2012
- Studios: Cava, Castle of Doom, Chem19, La Chunky, Glasgow, and Soma Electronic Music, Chicago
- Genres: Alternative rock, art rock
- Label: Domino
- Producers: John McEntire, the Pastels

The Pastels chronology
Two Sunsets (2009)	Slow Summits (2013)

Singles from Slow Summits
- 1. "Check Your Heart" Released: 8 April 2013; 2. "Kicking Leaves" Released: 21 November 2013

Slow Summits is the fifth studio album by the Scottish band the Pastels, released via Domino Recording Company in 2013. The album was their first proper studio album since 1997's Illumination, having released a soundtrack album and a collaborative album with Japanese avant-pop band Tenniscoats in between.

== Background ==
Stephen Pastel has explained that the large gap between albums stemmed partly from Annabel Wright's departure and being unsure of what direction to go in, but that their work on The Last Great Wilderness and providing music for theatre gave them an idea of the type of music they wanted to make and were capable of making; "We had a really good experience doing that and it progressed ideas that we had about the kind of music that we could make and the core elements of what The Pastels were about". A number of guests appear on the album including Gerard Love and Norman Blake from Teenage Fanclub, Ronald Lippok of To Rococo Rot and Saya & Takashi Ueno of Tenniscoats. The cover art was designed by former member Annabel Wright.

Given the album's long gestation period, some of the tracks on the record were written as far back as 1999 and had been part of the group's live set for a number of years. "Secret Music" and "Slow Summits" were both recorded for their last John Peel session in August 1999; the latter under the working title "Rundown Rendezvous". "Night Time Made Us" dates back to at least 2008, whilst versions of "Wrong Light" and "Slow Summits" (by then known as "Slowly Taking Place") were recorded for Marc Riley in March 2010 along with the as-yet unreleased track "The Ballad of Two Elms".

The album was influenced by a variety of different genres including krautrock, jazz, electronic music, soundtracks and art rock.

== Release ==
The album was announced on New Years Eve 2012 with a teaser video. The release preceded by the single "Check My Heart" in April 2013, backed by the B-side "Illuminum Song". In select UK independent record stores, the album was accompanied by a bonus mix CD of songs that inspired Stephen and Katrina during the making of the album entitled Insane Energy Drop. The physical copies did not come with a tracklisting. The mix was also uploaded online and a competition was held for fans to identify all the tracks. The person who identified the most tracks was offered a signed print of the album cover, something from The Pastels own archive, and a record of their choice from the Domino catalogue. The mix includes tracks by Movietone, Strawberry Switchblade, To Rococo Rot, Ela Orleans, Teenage Fanclub, International Airport, Faust and Television Personalities amongst others. A video for "Kicking Leaves" was released in November. The group promoted the album with selected dates across the UK and Europe and have continued to perform in these territories yearly since the album's release.

== Reception ==
The album received largely positive reviews from the music press. Ryan Foley of The Quietus described Slow Summits as "an album that isn't as immediately arresting as previous releases yet is still honest and spirited. Sixteen years of dormancy has done nothing to dull the Pastels' emotional sharpness". Dom Gourlay from Drowned in Sound rated the album 8/10; "Slow Summits represents arguably their most lovelorn, and occasionally exploratory collection of songs to date. While not brash or boisterous like debut long player Up For A Bit... and its predecessor Sittin' Pretty, Slow Summits is everything one would hope and expect to hear from a band cited as an influence by anyone and everyone from Kurt Cobain and Stuart Murdoch to Bobby Gillespie and Thurston Moore."

== Track listing ==
No.	Title	Writer(s)	Length
1.	"Secret Music"	Stephen McRobbie	3:26
2.	"Night Time Made Us"	McRobbie	4:54
3.	"Check My Heart"	Katrina Mitchell, Stephen McRobbie	3:40
4.	"Summer Rain"	McRobbie	5:00
5.	"After Image"	Mitchell, McRobbie	2:48
6.	"Kicking Leaves"	Mitchell	4:19
7.	"Wrong Light"	McRobbie	4:52
8.	"Slow Summits"	McRobbie, Crossley	6:26
9.	"Come to the Dance"	Mitchell	2:41

Japanese edition bonus tracks
No.	Title	Writer(s)	Length
10.	"Illuminum Song"	Hideki Kaji, Katrina Mitchell	4:19
11.	"Boats"	Mitchell, McRobbie	4:25

== Personnel ==
The Pastels

- Stephen McRobbie (or Stephen Pastel) – vocals, guitar
- Katrina Mitchell – vocals, drums, percussion, keyboards
- Tom Crossley – flute, keyboards
- Alison Mitchell – trumpet
- Gerard Love – bass guitar
- John Hogarty – guitar

Additional personnel

- Norman Blake – guitar, backing vocals
- Annabel "Aggi" Wright – cover artwork, backing vocals on "Secret Music"
- Bill Wells – guitar, keyboards
- Colin McIlroy – guitar
- Ronald Lippok – drums
- Stefan Schneider – keyboards
- Alison Lawrance – cello
- Xander Van Vilet – violin
- Lorna Rough – violin
- Jane Atkins – viola
- Craig Armstrong – string arrangements
- Tenniscoats – featured artists
- Takuji Aoyagi – guitar
- Bal Cooke – engineer
- Tony Doogan – engineer
- Paul Savage – engineer
- John McEntire – producer and engineer
