= Up for a Bit with The Pastels =

Up for a Bit with the Pastels

Studio album by the Pastels
- Released: 19 January 1987
- Recorded: September 1986
- Studio: W.S.R.S. Leamington Spa
- Genre: Indie pop
- Length: 31:47
- Label: Glass, Paperhouse
- Producer: John A. Rivers

The Pastels chronology
Up for a Bit with the Pastels (1987)	Sittin' Pretty (1989)

Professional ratings
Review scores
Source	Rating
AllMusic	4/5 stars

Up for a Bit with the Pastels is the debut album by the Scottish band the Pastels. The album was released in 19 January 1987. It was named the 37th best Scottish album by The Scotsman.

== Track listing ==
All songs written by Stephen McRobbie, except where noted.

1. "Ride" – 2:24
2. "Up for a Bit" (Martin Hayward, Bernice Simpson) – 3:36
3. "Crawl Babies" (Hayward, Simpson) – 2:45
4. "Address Book" (McRobbie, Brian Taylor) – 4:02
5. "I'm Alright with You" – 3:22
6. "Hitchin' a (Ride)" – 2:02
7. "Get 'Round Town" (McRobbie, Taylor) – 2:17
8. "Automatically Yours" – 2:43
9. "Baby Honey" (McRobbie, Taylor) – 5:52
10. "If I Could Tell You" (Hayward, Simpson) – 2:44

== Personnel ==
- Stephen McRobbie (or Stephen Pastel) – guitar, vocals
- Brian Taylor (or Brian Superstar) – guitar
- Martin Hayward – bass, vocals
- Bernice Simpson – drums
- Annabel Wright – vocals, percussion, keyboards, artwork
- John A. Rivers – producer, keyboards
