= Dim Stars =

American rock band

Dim Stars was an alternative rock supergroup active briefly in the early 1990s. The group was composed of bassist Richard Hell of Richard Hell and the Voidoids, guitarist Thurston Moore and drummer Steve Shelley from Sonic Youth, and guitarist Don Fleming from Gumball; there was some guitar work by Robert Quine, also of the Voidoids. Their initial release was a limited-edition set of three 7" EPs, which was later released as one CD on compact disc in 1992. This was followed by a full-length album, which was regarded as a showcase for Hell's songwriting abilities. The group did not tour together and essentially disbanded after the release of the LP.

== Discography ==
- 3 new songs (Ecstatic Peace!/Caroline Records, 1992) Under Richard Hell's name
- Dim Stars EP (Ecstatic Peace!/Caroline Records/Paperhouse, 1992)
- Dim Stars LP (Caroline Records, 1992); LP & CD (Paperhouse, 1992)
