= In Embrace =

- Origin: Leicestershire, Coventry, England
- Genres: Alternative Rock; Indie Pop; Art Rock
- Years active: 1981–1987
- Labels: Glass, Cherry Red
- Past members: Gary Knight; Cameron Lindo; Richard Formby; Peter Becker; Clive Dove; Joby Palmer; Steven Rees; Claire Johnson; Amanda Lydon

In Embrace were an English art rock, alternative rock, and indie pop band formed in Leicestershire in 1981 and later based in Coventry, England. They released seven singles, two albums and an EP/mini-album before splitting up in 1987.

== History ==
The band was formed in Leicestershire in 1981 by Gary Knight (vocals, keyboards, guitar) and Cameron Lindo (guitar, keyboards, vocals). The duo had previously been in the short-lived post-punk band, 3-Way Dance but, inspired by the likes of Eyeless in Gaza, Bron Area, Durutti Column and Young Marble Giants formed in Embrace 'to explore a broader emotional palette'. They released their debut EP, The Initial Caress, on Glass Records in May 1982. Encouraged by several radio airplays by DJ John Peel, they next released the "Sun Brings Smiles" single a few months later in 1982 along with the album Passionfruit Pastels.

Lindo left shortly after, with Knight (based in Coventry) alone featuring on the second single "The Living Daylights" in 1983. Knight then recruited former Religious Overdose guitarist Richard Formby. Adding former next-door neighbour Sinatras drummer Joby Palmer, the band's second album Too was released in 1983. Ex-Tuffs bassist Steve Rees joined this line-up which released two singles – "Your Heaven Scent" and "Shouting in Cafes". The latter song was recorded for Glass Records but eventually released on Cherry Red Records receiving airplay support from DJ Janice Long. The band's second single on Cherry Red – "This Brilliant Evening" – featured guitarist Clive Dove in place of Formby. The band based themselves in Coventry for most of their time together. Their line-up changed several times with Knight remaining the only constant member and others including Peter Becker of Eyeless in Gaza. Becker played bass, keyboards and various instruments on the band's final two singles – "A Room Upstairs" and "What's Got into Me?" and on every track of their final album, Songs About Snogging, which was due for release in 1987 by Glass, but was shelved after completion due to financial issues and remains unreleased to this day.

Formby was later a member of Spectrum and The Jazz Butcher and has gone on to be a successful producer, including two albums for Wild Beasts. Palmer went on to play in Eyeless in Gaza. Guitarist Clive Dove played guitar and bass for many other bands including Russian For Money, bassist Rees went on to play with Marina Del Ray.

A selection of the band's recordings for Glass Records were released on the album Wanderlust in 1986. The band's recordings for Cherry Red appeared several times on compilations released by the label, including five tracks on A Fine Day...and a Brilliant Evening: Cherry Red Rarities 1983–1985, a split album with Jane and Barton and Grab Grab the Haddock released in 2003.

In 2015, Glass Records was relaunched as Glass Redux with their first release being Passionfruit Pastels on CD and download for the first time with rare bonus tracks and a booklet containing unseen photos and extensive background notes by Gary Knight.

Later in 2015, Glass Redux released The Initial Caress on CD for the first time with 6 previously unreleased demo tracks and a booklet featuring unseen photos and extensive background notes by Knight.

Passionfruit Pastels received a 4-star review in the February 2016 issue of Mojo magazine, describing it as "a ravishing rediscovery".

Too was re-released by Glass Redux at the end of 2018 as a Grande Edition featuring a remastered version of the original album plus 9 bonus tracks including the 12-inch Extended version of Shouting In Cafés, Your Heaven Scent and two version of The Living Daylights. Again, the CD included a booklet featuring rare photos and extensive background notes by Knight. To coincide with the album's release, previously unseen footage from the 1983 recording session was released on YouTube featuring moments filmed by the band with producer John A. Rivers at Woodbine Recording Studio in Leamington Spa.

The February 2019 issue of Mojo included an early In Embrace track from the Passionfruit Pastels album - Our Star Drawn Through Panes - on the magazine's free monthly CD ""Swoon: 15 Alternative Pop Gems From The 1980's"".

In August 2019, the Emotional Rescue label announced the forthcoming release of The Living Daylights as a 12-inch vinyl EP featuring four versions of The Living Daylights - the 9-minute long 'Original Uncut Mix', the 'Live In Studio' live band version and two brand new mixes by DJ Timothy J. Fairplay. The single was released on March 23, 2020 (during the COVID-19 outbreak).

In January 2021, Glass Modern announced that they were taking pre-sale orders for a new In Embrace rarities album - Bonfire Of Love Letters - featuring 6 rare b-sides available in a digital format for the first time and 4 previously unreleased songs. The first five tracks were recorded in 1986–87 and produced by Peter Becker of Eyeless in Gaza who also plays bass and rhythms. These tracks originally appeared as B-sides on the vinyl-only singles A Room Upstairs and What’s Got Into Me? when the band revolved around songs by singer Gary Knight and guitarist Clive Dove with Becker on bass and Amanda Lydon on backing vocals. These tracks also include the first-ever released cover of a Young Marble Giants song - Brand-New-Life. The next two tracks are previously unreleased live mixing-desk recordings from a 1984 concert in Coventry featuring Richard Formby (Spectrum guitarist & Wild Beasts producer) on guitar, Joby Palmer on drums and Steve Rees on bass. The 8th track is a long-lost cover of the Kevin Hewick vocal-only Make produced by John A. Rivers - which was only available as a B-side of the 1983 7-inch single The Living Daylights. The final two tracks are previously unheard Dove/Knight songs recorded as home demos in 1986–87. The tracks were all mastered by Colin Lloyd Tucker and the album's artwork features a digital painting and design by Knight. The album was released on March 12 as a limited-edition CD and unlimited download album - available on Bandcamp, Amazon, iTunes Store and other digital platforms.

In March 2021, an In Embrace book was published to coincide with the album release - In Embrace: Bonfire Of Love Letters - a 65-page full-colour 8.5 inch square paperback. Written and designed by Gary Knight with contributions from guitarist Clive Dove, bassist/producer Peter Becker (Eyeless in Gaza), Dave Barker (Glass Modern), Stuart Moxham (Young Marble Giants) and Kevin Hewick, the book features full lyrics, song-by-song notes, rare photos, gig details and personal comments. It is available on Amazon.

In August 2021, Demon Music Group released Gary Crowley's Lost 80s Volume 2 - "65 eclectic & diverse tracks spread across 4 CD’s" with Your Heaven Scent (Plays Hell With Me) by In Embrace included amongst tracks by many major acts including Elvis Costello, The B52's, The Style Council, Bananarama, and The Human League.

In October 2021, Cherry Red released 'The Sun Shines Here' - A 74-track 3xCD boxset exploring the evolution of Indie Pop - the set included the first In Embrace 7-inch single 'Sun Brings Smiles'(1982) amongst tracks from a host of successful and/or influential indie bands including Prefab Sprout, The Jesus and Mary Chain, Scritti Politti, Aztec Camera and The Raincoats.

In October 2022, Cherry Red released 'C85' - a 3xCD boxset featuring 'the best of the Indie Scene in 1985' which includes 'Shouting In Cafes' by In Embrace amongst tracks by many other 80s Indie-Pop/Rock bands including Jesus & Mary Chain, Primal Scream, The Housemartins and James.

In February 2023, Glass Modern released 'Glass Remade/Remodelled' a 20-track CD compilation featuring cover versions of original Glass Records tracks by current Glass Modern artists. These included the In Embrace track 'Tears Turn Fresh' as a remodelled piece by Deux Filles (Simon Turner and Colin LloydTucker).

== Releases ==
=== Books ===
- In Embrace: Bonfire Of Love Letters (2021, paperback. Available on Amazon)

=== Albums ===
- The Initial Caress (1982 Mini Album), Glass, (2015 CD + demos & digital album), Glass Redux
- Passionfruit Pastels (1982 LP), Glass, (2015 CD + bonus tracks & digital album), Glass Redux
- Too (1983 LP), Glass, (2018 Grande Edition CD + bonus tracks & digital album), Glass Redux
- Songs About Snogging (1987), Glass (still unreleased)
- Bonfire Of Love Letters (2021 Limited-edition CD + digital album) Glass Modern

=== Compilations ===
- Wanderlust (1982–1984 LP) (1986), Glass
- This Brilliant Evening (1986), Music-Box/Cherry Red
- A Fine Day & A Brilliant Evening (2003), CD with Jane & Barton Grab Grab The Haddock Cherry Red

=== Singles/EPs ===
- Sun Brings Smiles (1982 7-inch), Glass
- The Living Daylights (1983 7-inch), Glass
- Your Heaven Scent (Plays Hell With Me) (1984 12+7-inch), Glass
- Shouting in Cafés (1985 12+7-inch), Cherry Red
- This Brilliant Evening (1985 12+7-inch), Cherry Red
- A Room Upstairs (1986 12+7-inch), Glass
- What's Got into Me? (1987 12-inch EP), Glass
- The Living Daylights (Timothy J. Fairplay Remixes) (2020 12-inch & download EP), Emotional Rescue
