= Spitfire (English band) =

British rock band

- Origin: Crawley, West Sussex, England
- Genres: Rock
- Years active: 1990–1996
- Labels: Paperhouse, Lowlife, Eve Recordings
- Past members: Nick Pitcher; Jeff Pitcher; Steve White; Justin Welch; Steven Walker; Matt Wise; Scott Kenny; Steve Burgan; Lawrence Shaft

Spitfire are a British rock n roll band from Crawley, West Sussex, whose ever-changing line-up revolved around brothers Jeff and Nick Pitcher. Other members included Steve White, Justin Welch, Steven Walker (who went on to play in the Auteurs and Modern English), Matt Wise, and Scott Kenny.

Two early EPs on Eve Recordings saw the band linked to the shoegazing scene, and to the Scene That Celebrates Itself, although a cover of "The Six Million Dollar Man" theme staked out their retro garage rock appeal.

Their debut album, 'SexBomb' was released on Records 1993

'Feverish' is a 6-track compilation of the first two EVE Recordings EP's 'Translucent' & 'Superbaby', which was licensed to and released by the French label Danceteria in 1992.

Spitfire were hailed as influential by many New wave of new wave bands, and regularly gigged with S*M*A*S*H and These Animal Men between 1993 and 1996. The Pitcher brothers were resident DJs at Brighton club The Basement, which with Camden's Good Mixer pub and Blow Up club was at the core of the pre-Britpop scene.

In 1994 a 3 track e.p 'Big Banger' was released on the Lowlife label. The line up now included the Pitcher brothers, Steve Burgan on guitar and Lawrence Shaft on drums. UK tours followed and a live session featured on BBC Radio 1's Mark Radcliffe show.

A second album Electric Colour Climax, followed on Lowlife Records in 1996. The band courted controversy, with a sleeve featuring a retro pornographic image, found at London's Toe Rag Studies where the band had recorded the album on vintage recording equipment in three days.

The band drifted apart around 1996, with the Pitcher brothers forming Cheetah. Wise and Kenny had, meanwhile, started a new band called Society who continued to write and perform material until Wise's death in 2021.

Nick Pitcher has a family of groups, Rex Speedway and Thee Fortune Tellers, Rex Speedway and the Denim Avengers, Rex Speedway and the Majestic 12 and Rex Speedway and the MKUltra.
