= Disinterest (album) =

Studio album by the Servants
- Released: 1990
- Recorded: 17–18 April 1990
- Studio: Golddust, Bromley
- Genre: Indie rock, art rock
- Length: 42:40
- Language: English
- Label: Paperhouse
- Producer: Mark Dawson

The Servants chronology
''Disinterest'' (1990)	Small Time (2012)

Singles from Disinterest
- 1. "Look Like A Girl" Released: August 1990

Disinterest is the first album by English indie band the Servants. The record was released in 1990 on Paperhouse Records.

== Recording ==
Disinterest was recorded by Mark Dawson.

On the context of the recording, David Westlake says: “The album came out of a set of unspeakable frustrations and miscellaneous perversity.” There were label issues: “We ended up with the record company for whom we did the album not directly through choice.”

The album was recorded cheaply. Luke Haines later wrote: “The initial plan is to record with Steve Albini, but this never happens. Then Kramer’s name is mentioned as a possible producer. Nope. Eventually the album is recorded and mixed in office hours over five days in a demo studio in Bromley.”

== Release history ==
Paperhouse Records issued Disinterest in LP and CD formats in 1990.

Paperhouse took the song “Look Like a Girl” from the album for release as a 7” single in August 1990 (the Servants' fourth single). Two live recordings appear on the B-side: “Bad Habits Die Hard” (otherwise unrecorded), and “It’s My Turn” (the Servants' previous single); both live tracks were recorded on 4 May 1989 at AJZ Gaskessel in Biel/Bienne, Switzerland. The words “in case of Fire break Glass” are etched into the single's run-out groove: a Westlake comment on record-label Paperhouse resulting from an ill-omened partnership, between Glass Records and Fire Records.

Disinterest has long been unavailable. Interviewed in 2014, David Westlake said: “Unfortunately, the album was deleted not long after release. It hasn’t been available for more than twenty years and I don’t see it being reissued.” Likewise, Luke Haines says Disinterest is “stuck in an irretrievable record company quagmire, where it looks set to remain.”

== Reception ==
Mojo magazine included Disinterest in its December 2011 list of the greatest British indie records of all time; Clive Prior described the album as “Arty, experimental and notable for Westlake’s fabulously mordant lyrics.” Tim Peacock at Record Collector magazine observed in 2013 that: “while it’s recently been dusted down for critical reappraisal, [Disinterest] remains out of print.” Matthew Fiander at PopMatters called Disinterest “a great record.... Angular and bittersweet.”

Luke Haines describes Disinterest as “art rock, ten years too late and fifteen years too early”.

== Track listing ==
=== Side one ===
1. Move Out (3:40)
2. The Power of Woman (3:25)
3. Restless (3:47)
4. Third Wheel (3:06)
5. Thin-Skinned (2:42)
6. Self-Destruction (2:45)

=== Side two ===
1. Hush Now (5:40)
2. They Should Make a Statue (2:58)
3. Hey, Mrs John (2:55)
4. Look Like a Girl (4:07)
5. Big Future (2:51)
6. Afterglow (4:44)

== Personnel ==
- David Westlake – vocals and guitar
- Luke Haines – vocals, guitar and piano
- Alice Readman – bass
- Andy Bennett – drums
