= Electric Colour Climax =

Studio album by Spitfire
- Released: 1996
- Recorded: 9–13 March 1996; ToeRag Studios; Shoreditch, London, England
- Genre: Rock
- Label: Lowlife

Spitfire chronology
Sex Bomb (1993)	Electric Colour Climax (1996)

Electric Colour Climax is the second album from the band Spitfire, released in 1996 on Lowlife Records. At the time of recording, the band was living in Crawley but involved in running events at Brighton nightclub The Basement. The brothers Nick and Jeff Pitcher shared DJ duties at the club, playing 1960s and 1970s psychedelia and garage rock; bands like the MC5, The Stooges and The Ramones had a huge influence on the album's sound.

Electric Colour Climax had a harder rock sound than the band's previous album, Sex Bomb, and seemed even more at odds with the Britpop movement that was prevalent around the time of its release. However, members of Britpop bands Elastica, Menswe@r, Lush and Supergrass were seen wearing Spitfire's distinctive badges, featuring an 'S' logo stolen from TV programme World of Sport.

The 14 tracks that make up Electric Colour Climax were recorded from 9–13 March 1996 at ToeRag Studios, Shoreditch, London. (with the exception of track 5, Rip My Sweetheart). All tracks were written by Jeff and Nick Pitcher, with musicians sharing writing credits on 6 tracks.

The core of Spitfire was still the Pitcher brothers, Jeff on vocals and Nick on bass and guitars. Drummer Justin Welch had left before this album to join Elastica and for a short time it seemed that Lush's Chris Ackland might fill the vacancy. In the end, Scott Kenny (from a much earlier Spitfire line-up) and Rob Colley (originally with Brighton funk band Arthur) took over on drums. Additional guitars were provided by Matt Wise and Pete Whittick, with long-term roadie Turbo Bob McPherson guesting on three tracks. Piano, organ and additional vocals (most noticeably on track 4 Electric Colour Climax) were provided by Vanessa Widdup, a friend of producer Liam Watson. Track 9 samples Iggy Pop from a live album.

== Track listing ==
1. Judy Garland 2:24
2. Hey Go Easy 1:33
3. Rubber Rosie 3:25
4. Electric Colour Climax 4:03
5. Rip My Sweetheart 2:09
6. Gemini Born Angel 3:06
7. Turbo Starbars 2:17
8. Gimme Ya Good Times 2:30
9. I Am The Greatest 3:37
10. Give Blood 3:13
11. Baredoll 3:45
12. Shit City 6:30
13. Dead End 1:37

69. C'mon Get On (Hidden Bonus Track)
