= The Last Great Wilderness =

- Film Poster
- Directed by: David Mackenzie
- Written by: Michael Tait; Alastair Mackenzie; Gillian Berrie; David Mackenzie
- Starring: Alastair Mackenzie; Victoria Smurfit; David Hayman; Martin Bell
- Cinematography: Simon Dennis
- Edited by: Jake Roberts
- Music by: The Pastels
- Release date: February 2002
- Running time: 95 minutes
- Country: United Kingdom
- Language: English

The Last Great Wilderness is a 2002 dark comedy horror film directed by David Mackenzie. It stars Alastair Mackenzie and Jonathan Phillips. It was produced by Gillian Berrie at Sigma Films. Scottish band The Pastels provided the soundtrack, which was released as an album in 2003.

== Cast ==
- Alastair Mackenzie as Charlie
- Jonathan Phillips as Vincente
- Ewan Stewart as Magnus
- David Hayman as Ruaridh
- Victoria Smurfit as Claire
- Martin Bell as William
