= Walkingseeds =

English alternative rock band

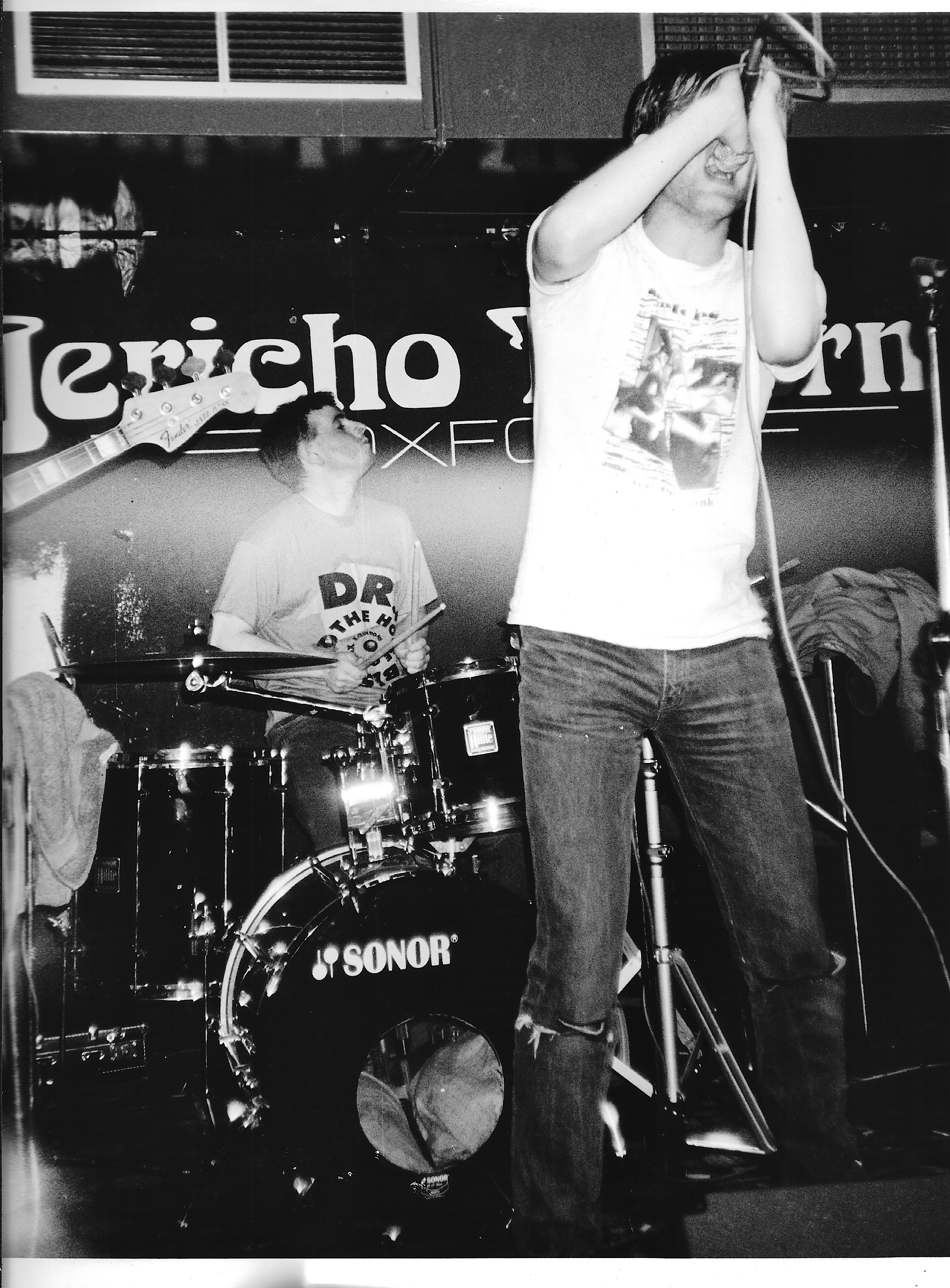
- Walkingseeds (1989)

Background information
- Origin: Liverpool, England
- Genres: Alternative rock, psychedelic rock
- Years active: 1986-early 1990s
- Labels: Probe Plus, Glass, Clawfist, Paperhouse
- Spinoff of: The Mel-o-Tones
- Past members: Frank Martin; Bob Parker; John Neesam; Barry Sutton; Tony Mogan; Andy Rowan; Lee Webster; Jon Kyme; Mark Middleton; Don Fleming

Walkingseeds were an English alternative rock band, formed in 1986 in Liverpool.

== History ==
Frank Martin (vocals), Bob Parker (guitar), and John Neesam (drums) had previously worked together as the Mel-o-Tones, releasing a mini-LP and an EP on Liverpool label Probe Plus. They met while students at Liverpool art school 1982–84, as was Martin Dempsey (ex-Yachts), also in the Mel-o-Tones. After appearing as The Corinthians for a few months, during which time they recorded a seven-track demo, they decided on a change of name to Walkingseeds, and debuted in June 1986 with the Know Too Much EP, still on Probe Plus. The band's sound was characterised as "psychedelic grunge". Neesam departed and the others drafted in former Marshmallow Overcoat guitarist Barry Sutton and drummer Tony Mogan.

After the Mark Chapman single on their own Moral Burro label, they returned to Probe Plus with their debut album, Skullfuck (the title influenced by a Grateful Dead album cover), released in late 1987. Skullfuck was later cited by Nirvana's Kurt Cobain as an influence. The band worked with Kramer on the second album, Upwind of Disaster, Downwind of Atonement, released on Glass Records in 1989. Sutton departed to join The La's and was replaced by Andy Rowan for the Shaved Beatnik EP. The band drafted in Nick Saloman (aka The Bevis Frond) and brought in Lee Webster as a replacement for Rowan. The Sensory Deprivation Chamber Quartet Dwarf mini-album followed in 1989, and was their last release for Glass. After a split single with Bevis Frond, they moved on to Paperhouse Records for their next album, Bad Orb, Whirling Ball (1990).

The band continued into the mid-1990s, with Dinosaur Jr's Don Fleming joining for a time, before splitting up, with Parker and Mogan forming The Del-Bloods and later White Bitch. Martin later reappeared in Batloaf's Meat Loaf parody Meat out of Hell along with Parker and Mogan. Sutton and Webster joined Froth.

The band recorded four sessions for John Peel's BBC Radio 1 show between 1987 and 1990.

== Discography ==
=== Albums ===
- Skullfuck (1987) Probe Plus (UK Indie No. 26)
- Upwind of Disaster, Downwind of Atonement (1989) Glass
- Sensory Deprivation Chamber Quartet Dwarf (1989) Glass
- Bad Orb, Whirling Ball (1990) Paperhouse
- Earth Is Hell (live) (1991) Snakeskin
- Mirrorshades (1993) Butcher's Hook

=== Singles ===
- Know Too Much EP (1986) Probe Plus
- "Mark Chapman" (1987) Moral Burro
- Shaved Beatnik EP (1989) Glass
- "Reflection in a Tall Mirror" (1990) Clawfist (split with Bevis Frond)
- "Gates of Freedom" (1990) Paperhouse
- "Rollin' Machine" (1993) Fist Puppet
- "Beat Them All to Death" (1994) Dental
