= Nagisa ni te =

Nagisa Ni te
- Origin: Osaka, Japan
- Genres: Folk rock Psychedelic rock
- Years active: 1992-present
- Labels: Org; P-Vine; Geographic Music; Jagjaguwar
- Members: Shinji Shibayama; Masako Takeda
- Past members: Ikuro Takahashi
- Website: Official Site

Nagisa Ni te (渚にて) is a Japanese psychedelic-folk rock duo. The group's name (渚にて) is translated as "on the beach". Shinji Shibayama, the group's founder — and a previous member of Idiot O'Clock and Hallelujahs — is also owner of Org Records, which has released albums from groups like Maher Shalal Hash Baz and Naoki Zushi.

Tori Kudo, member of Maher Shalal Hash Baz, described the group as:

"Nagisa Ni te's naked Progressive rock-based worldly songs, which are sung not so much deliberately as seriously, on their love beach, now fill a blank somewhere between underground hi-fi and overground lo-fi."

Masako Takeda is the other half of the duo, and is the longtime girlfriend of Shibayama.

Shibayama and Takeda are the core members of the group, but they often employ a line-up of guest members that contribute to their music. The most consistent of these are Ikuro Takahashi, Eiji Tanaka, Naoki Zushi, Soichiro Nakamura and occasional members of Maher Shalal Hash Baz.

The group's lyrics deal largely with nature, with simple, mood-driven instrumentation. They have been compared to Pink Floyd, Tim Hardin, Tim Buckley, Nick Drake, Neil Young and the Velvet Underground, with occasional long guitar and keyboard "freak-outs".

== Discography ==
- On the Love Beach (Jagjaguwar, 1995)
- The True Sun (1998)
- The True World (1999)
- Orbital Confluence - Benefit 2000 (split with Aube and Naoki Zushi, 2000)
- Songs for a Simple Moment (Geographic, 2001)
- Feel (Jagjaguwar, 2002)
- The Same As a Flower (Jagjaguwar, 2004)
- Dream Sounds (Jagjaguwar, 2005)
- Yosuga (Jagjaguwar, 2008)
- 星も知らない (2017)
