= Sittin' Pretty (The Pastels album) =

Studio album by the Pastels
- Released: 1989
- Recorded: November 1987, July 1988, January 1989
- Studio: REL, Edinburgh
- Genre: Indie pop
- Length: 39:08
- Label: US-Homestead; UK-Chapter 22
- Producer: Richard Mazda

The Pastels chronology
Suck On (1988)	Sittin' Pretty (1989)	Truckload of Trouble (1994)

Singles from Sittin' Pretty
- 1. "Baby, You're Just You" Released: November 1988

Sittin' Pretty is the second album by the Scottish band the Pastels, released in 1989.

== Critical reception ==
Professional ratings
Review scores
Source	Rating
AllMusic	4.5/5 stars
The Encyclopedia of Popular Music	3/5 stars

Trouser Press wrote that "while there's nothing new in Sittin' Pretty's off-key awkwardness and gawky grooves (for the first time, the Pastels sound like they're consciously trying to sound like themselves), this outing from the monsters of twee is not without its gems." The New York Times wrote that the album "has melodies as simple as nursery rhymes, cut to shreds by brazen, bullying guitar solos." Martin C. Strong wrote that the album "featured some of the sweetest, juiciest moments in The Pastels' chequered career." The Glasgow Herald called the album "a small but perfectly formed eccentricity in which the spirits of Iggy Pop, Jonathan Richman, and the Velvet Underground combine in wistful splendour."

== Track listing ==
No.	Title	Length
1.	"Nothing to Be Done"	3:55
2.	"Anne Boleyn"	3:06
3.	"Sit on It Mother"	3:46
4.	"Holy Moly"	2:57
5.	"Ugly Town"	3:07
6.	"Zooom"	2:53
7.	"Baby, You're Just You"	5:21
8.	"Ditch the Fool"	7:54
9.	"Sittin' Pretty"	3:42
10.	"Swerve"	2:22
Total length:		36:46

== Personnel ==
- Stephen Pastel – guitar, vocals, design
- Brian Taylor – guitar
- Martin Hayward – bass, guitar
- Bernice Simpson – drums
- Annabel Wright – keyboards, design, vocals
- David Keegan – guitar
- Sophie Pragnell – viola
- Eugene Kelly – vocals
- Nicole Geddes – cello
- Richard Mazda – harmonica, percussion, producer, autoharp
- Neil Ross & Mark Smith – engineer
- Dougie McBride – photography
