= Small Time (album) =

Studio album by The Servants
- Released: October 2012
- Recorded: 1991
- Studio: 9 First Avenue, Hayes, Middlesex; 9 Cannon Road, Southgate, London
- Genre: Indie; Art rock
- Length: 42:38
- Language: English
- Label: Cherry Red
- Producer: David Westlake; Luke Haines

The Servants chronology
| Disinterest (1990) | ''Small Time'' (2012) |

Small Time is the second and final album by English indie band The Servants. It was recorded in 1991 but had to wait twenty-one years for release: a “lost second album that had been gathering dust for half a generation.”

Cherry Red Records released Small Time in 2012, following the inclusion of The Servants’ first album, Disinterest, in Mojo magazine’s 2011 list of the greatest British indie records of all time.

== Recording ==
Luke Haines recalls the 1991 recording of Small Time:

Our work routine goes like this. [David] Westlake records a demo at home on his four-track machine, comprising rhythm guitar, bass-part, programmed drum machine, and vocals. He then brings the recording over to me, where on my machine we add overdubs – including lots of CAT synth, and in the case of “Everybody Has a Dream” the contents of the kitchen sink . . . these recordings, completed in the living room of my flat in Cannon Road, Southgate, are the album.

The Servants played their final gig around the time of the recording, on 21 August 1991 at the Rock Garden, London WC2.

In 2012, the tapes were restored and the recordings mixed by Des Lambert: “A lot of time went into transferring and synchronising the tapes. Different parts were on different tapes recorded at minutely varying speeds, so it was a complex job marrying everything together.”

== Release history ==
Cherry Red Records issued Small Time in double-CD format in October 2012. The second disc – Hey Hey We're The Manqués – is a collection of first-album-era demos.

The album was reissued as a double-LP (omitting six tracks) in December 2013.

== Reception ==
The album was well received. In Mojo, Kieron Tyler said “It’s a sound and style that has to be heard, from a unique band that merits an instant reappraisal.” In Record Collector magazine, Tim Peacock said the album had “an undernourished, if endearing demo-like quality” which showed “Westlake at his nervy, playful best.” At PopMatters, Matthew Fiander called Small Time “the darker counterpart” to Disinterest. Tim Sendra at AllMusic noted the album’s “wonderfully literate and off-kilter songcraft.”

Small Time is David Westlake’s favourite Servants record: “I like the way of thinking expressed in the songs. How ‘Everybody Has A Dream’ answers the complaint ‘All you get is nowhere,’ by reasoning ‘Where is there to get?’”

Luke Haines describes the songs on Small Time as “looser, more mysterious, strange and beautiful, [. . .] and sounding . . . like nothing else really.”

== Track listing ==
=== CD ===
Disc one: Small Time

1. Everybody Has a Dream (3:27)
2. Don’t Leave Town (1:17)
3. People Going Places (1:59)
4. Complete Works (2:36)
5. Dating then Waiting (2:02)
6. Born to Dance (1:59)
7. Motivation (1:28)
8. Let’s Live a Little (3:13)
9. Aim in Life (1.52)
10. Rejection (2:37)
11. Fear Eats the Soul (2:10)
12. The Thrill of it All (2:50)
13. All Talk (1:06)
14. Out of your Life (2:02)
15. Slow Dancing (3:34)
16. Born to Dance [2] (1:53)
17. The Thrill of it All [2] (2:40)
18. All Talk [2] (1:02)
19. Out of your Life [2] (2:04)

Disc two: Hey Hey We’re The Manqués

1. The Word Around Town (3:46)
2. She Whom Once I Dreamt Of (2:02)
3. You’d Do Me Good (2:52)
4. She Grew and She Grew (3:26)
5. She’s Always Hiding (3:01)
6. Look Like a Girl (4:04)
7. Third Wheel (3:16)
8. Thin-Skinned (2:44)
9. Hey, Mrs John (2:57)
10. They Should Make a Statue (2:58)
11. Move Out (3:47)
12. Big Future (2:51)
13. Restless (4:06)
14. The Power of Woman (3:32)
15. Hush Now (5:42)
16. Afterglow (5:06)
17. Self-Destruction (2:21)

=== LP ===
Side one: Small Time

1. Everybody Has a Dream (3:27)
2. Don’t Leave Town (1:17)
3. People Going Places (1:59)
4. Complete Works (2:36)
5. Dating then Waiting (2:02)
6. Born to Dance (1:59)
7. Motivation (1:28)
8. Let’s Live a Little (3:13)

Side two: Small Time

1. Aim in Life (1.52)
2. Rejection (2:37)
3. Fear Eats the Soul (2:10)
4. The Thrill of it All (2:50)
5. All Talk (1:06)
6. Out of your Life (2:02)
7. Slow Dancing (3:34)

Side three: Hey Hey We're The Manqués

1. The Word Around Town (3:46)
2. She Whom Once I Dreamt Of (2:02)
3. You’d Do Me Good (2:52)
4. She Grew and She Grew (3:26)
5. She’s Always Hiding (3:01)
6. Hey, Mrs John (2:57)
7. Afterglow (5:06)

Side four: Hey Hey We’re The Manqués

1. Look Like a Girl (4:04)
2. Third Wheel (3:16)
3. Thin-Skinned (2:44)
4. They Should Make a Statue (2:58)
5. Move Out (3:47)
6. Big Future (2:51)
7. Restless (4:06)

== Personnel ==
- David Westlake – vocals, guitar and bass
- Luke Haines – vocals, guitar, piano and CAT Octave VCO synthesiser

=== Technical personnel ===
- Des Lambert – tape restoration, mixing
- Del Sozou – artwork, design
