= Mobile Safari =

Studio album by the Pastels
- Released: February 1995
- Recorded: 1994
- Studio: Cava Sound Workshops and Stuffhouse, Glasgow
- Genre: Indie pop, indie rock
- Length: 37:59
- Label: Domino
- Producer: Paul Chisholm, the Pastels

The Pastels chronology
Sittin' Pretty (1989)	Mobile Safari (1995)	Illumination (1997)

Singles from Mobile Safari
- 1. "Yoga" Released: October 1994; 2. "Worlds of Possibility" Released: 1995

Mobile Safari is the third album by the Scottish band the Pastels, released in 1995.

== Production ==
The album was recorded at Glasgow's Stuffhouse Studios and CAVA Sound Workshops. Dean Wareham contributed guitar to a few tracks.

"Flightpaths to Each Other" was also the name of an art exhibit organized by the band in 1994, in Glasgow.

== Critical reception ==
Professional ratings
Review scores
Source	Rating
AllMusic	4.5/5 stars
The Encyclopedia of Popular Music	3/5 stars

AllMusic wrote that the band "stretched out to an American audience with their calm and reflective style of blissful indie pop." The Encyclopedia of Popular Music called the album "an enjoyable collection of ragamuffin odes to life in and outside of an underachieving indie band." Trouser Press wrote that the album "builds upon the Pastels’ oft-copied shambling pop sound, but rounds off some of the songs’ rough edges with fleshed-out arrangements and sensitive, clear production." Martin C. Strong called it "a wryly self-deprecating look at an indie band’s lot." Spin wrote that "this spacious record goes way beyond the shambly pop aesthetic with which the Pastels are associated."

== Track listing ==
All songs written by Stephen McRobbie, except where noted.

1. "Exploration Team" (David Keegan, McRobbie) – 3:04
2. "Mandarin" (Katrina Mitchell) – 3:26
3. "Yoga" (McRobbie, Annabel Wright) – 4:17
4. "Mobile Deli" (Wright) – 1:32
5. "Exotic Arcade" – 2:58
6. "Classic Line-Up" – 3:17
7. "Flightpaths to Each Other" (Keegan, McRobbie) – 2:12
8. "Basement Scam" – 4:50
9. "Strategic Gear" – 1:52
10. "Token Collecting" (Mitchell) – 3:13
11. "Coolport" – 3:32
12. "Worlds of Possibility" (Wright, Mitchell, McRobbie) – 3:46

== Personnel ==
- Stephen McRobbie (or Stephen Pastel) – guitar, vocals
- Katrina Mitchell – drums, vocals, percussion, keyboards, guitar
- Annabel Wright (or Aggi) – bass, vocals, keyboards, guitar, artwork
- David Keegan – guitar
- Dean Wareham – guitar
- Norman Blake – guitar, vocals, percussion
- Gerard Love – guitar, vocals
- Sarah Ward – flute
- Judi Mitchell – cor anglais
- Dawn Kelly – French horn
- Maureen Roberts – saxophone
- Luke Williams – trombone
- Darren Ramsay – trumpet
- Laura Mitchell – viola
