= Illumination (The Pastels album) =

Studio album by the Pastels
- Released: 9 September 1997
- Studio: Cava, Glasgow
- Genre: Indie pop
- Length: 42:43
- Label: Domino
- Producer: The Pastels, Gregor Reid, Ian Carmichael

The Pastels chronology
Mobile Safari (1995)	Illumination (1997)	The Last Great Wilderness (2003)

Singles from Illumination
- 1. "Unfair Kind of Fame" Released: June 1997; 2. "The Hits Hurt" Released: August 1997

Illumination is the fourth studio album by the Scottish band the Pastels, originally released via Domino Recording Company in 1997. The album shows the group honing in on a warmer, gentler and more subdued sound compared to their previous work. It is their last studio album to feature longtime member Annabel "Aggi" Wright as a full member before she left to concentrate on her career as an illustrator in 2000. Whilst The Pastels continued to release music, Illumination would be their last proper studio album for 16 years, until the release of Slow Summits in 2013.

== Reception ==
Professional ratings
Review scores
Source	Rating
AllMusic	3.5/5 stars
NME	7/10
Uncut	4/5 stars

Stephen Thomas Erlewine of AllMusic said, "Scaling back the snappy production and crisp guitars of their earlier releases, the group crafts a collection of subdued, lovely melodies in the vein of the Velvet Underground's third album." He added, "While the Pastels lack Lou Reed's lyricism or the Velvets' assured experimentalism, the hushed ambience and sighing melodies of Illumination make it a charming listen." Angela Lewis of The Independent said, "The patron saints of Scottish indie pop retain their love of gently poignant lyrics and mellow guitar rustlings with their umpteenth album in 10 years; but now there's a new electronic edge, adding curiosity value."

== Track listing ==
No.	Title	Writer(s)	Length
1.	"The Hits Hurt"	Stephen Pastel	3:48
2.	"Cycle"	Pastel, Aggi	4:33
3.	"Thomson Colour"	Katrina Mitchell	1:43
4.	"Unfair Kind of Fame"	Mitchell	4:21
5.	"Fragile Gang"	Pastel	2:39
6.	"The Viaduct"	Pastel, Mitchell	5:08
7.	"Remote Climbs"	Pastel	2:46
8.	"Rough Riders"	Pastel, Aggi	4:31
9.	"On the Way"	Aggi	3:38
10.	"Leaving this Island"	Mitchell	2:31
11.	"G12 Nights"	Pastel	1:12
12.	"Attic Plan"	Pastel	4:22
13.	"Mechanised"	Mitchell	1:31

Japanese edition bonus tracks
No.	Title	Writer(s)	Length
14.	"Frozen Wave"	Pastel, Aggi	5:07
15.	"Windy Hill"	Mitchell	3:59

== Personnel ==
Credits adapted from liner notes.

- Stephen Pastel – guitar, vocals, keyboards
- Aggi Wright – bass guitar, vocals, melodica
- Katrina Mitchell – drums, vocals, keyboards, melodica, violin, arrangement
- Jonathan Kilgour – guitar
- Gerard Love – guitar
- Norman Blake – guitar, vocals
- Dean Wareham – guitar, vocals
- Bill Wells – piano, arrangement
- Sarah Ward – flute
- Isobel Campbell – cello
- Dawn Kelly – French horn
- Gregor Reid – percussion
