= The Pastels =

Scottish indie rock band

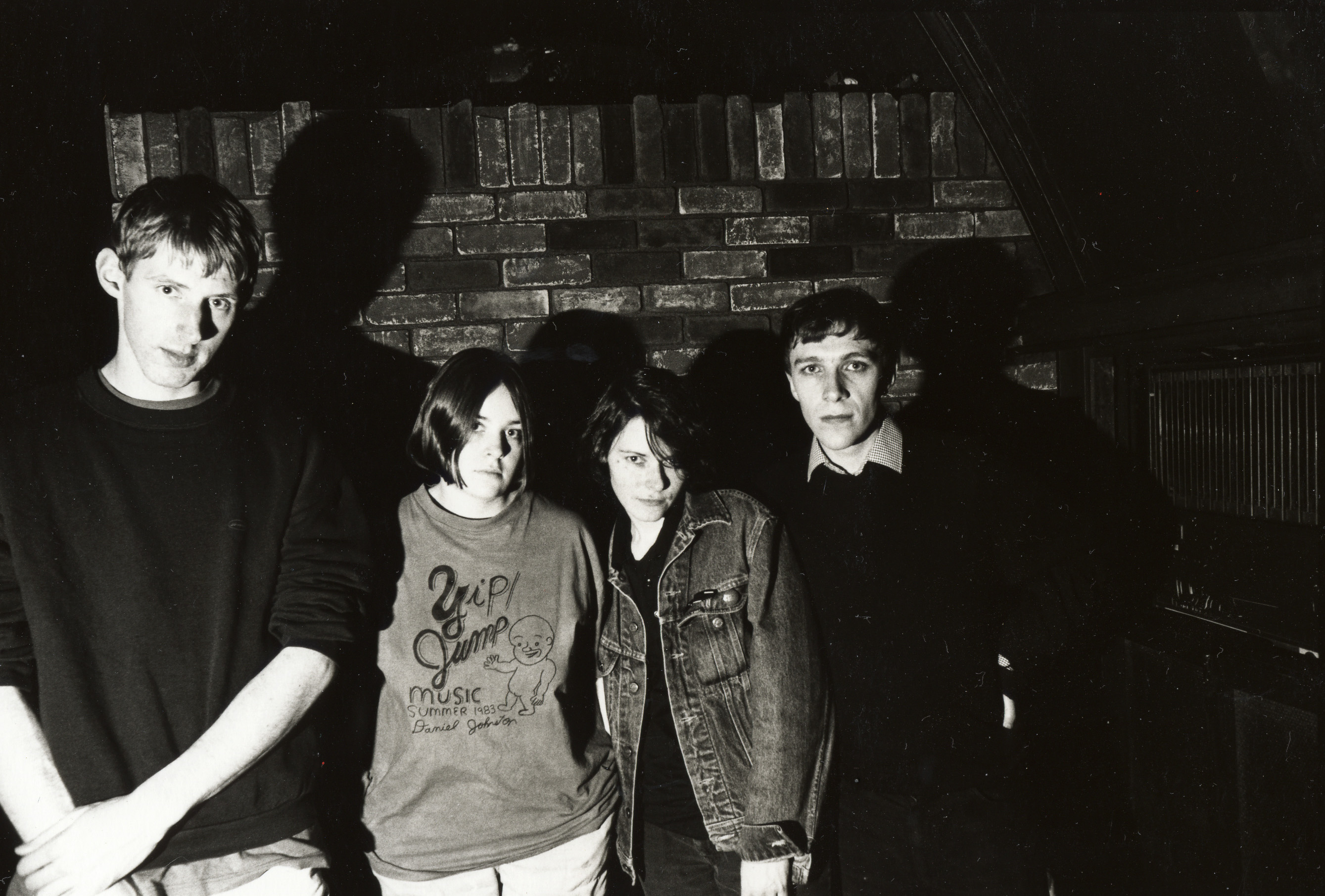
- The Pastels in Tokyo, early 1990s

Background information
- Origin: Glasgow, Scotland
- Genres: Indie pop; alternative rock; jangle pop; post-punk
- Years active: 1981–present
- Labels: Domino; Geographic Music
- Members: Stephen McRobbie; Mitch K Mitchell; John Hogarty; Tom Crossley; Suse Bear
- Website: www.thepastels.org

The Pastels are an indie rock group from Glasgow formed in 1981. They were a key act of the Scottish and British independent music scenes of the 1980s, and are specifically credited for the development of an independent and confident music scene in Glasgow. The group have had a number of members, but currently consists of Stephen McRobbie, Mitch K Mitchell, Tom Crossley, John Hogarty, and Suse Bear.

== History ==
=== Formation ===
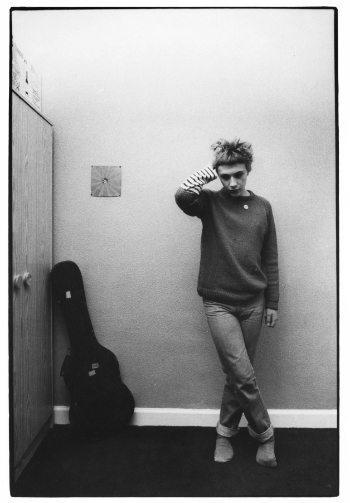
Stephen Pastel in 1982

The group formed in 1981 amid the peak of the Postcard Records era of independent music in Glasgow. Brian Taylor, a friend at the time of Postcard's Alan Horne, recruited McRobbie, Hayward, and Simpson for his new band. The band first performed at Bearsden Burgh Hall, booked by McRobbie after he attended a Crass gig at the same venue.

The band released their first single, "Songs for Children," on Whaam! Records in 1982, followed by their tape "Entertaining Edward" that same year on Action Tapes.

==== Singles ====
The band released a series of singles from 1982–1986, starting with "Something Going On" and B-side "I Wonder Why" in 1983. The latter record was later separately released by Rough Trade after McRobbie travelled to see Geoff Travis at the label's office in London, where he insisted that they were "the next big thing out of Scotland." The band then released "Million Tears" in 1984, "I'm Alright With You" in 1985, and "Truck Train Tractor" in 1986, all on other labels after their relationship with Rough Trade declined as the label focused more heavily on their other artists such as "shinier new signings" Scritti Politti and the Smiths.

These releases were published on a variety of labels including Whaam!, Creation, and Glass Records, and all had a raw and immediate sound, melodic and amateur, which seemed at odds with the time.

Prior to their breakout album, the band appeared in a John Peel session, as well as a variety of zines. McRobbie at this period undertook a master's degree in librarianship at Glasgow University, which would ensure the band remained rooted in Glasgow during their newfound fame.

The Pastels' sound continued to evolve and, although part of NME's C86 compilation, in interviews they always sought to distance themselves from both twee and shambling developments.

=== Up for a Bit with the Pastels ===
Their debut album, Up for a Bit with The Pastels (Glass, 1987; re-issue Paperhouse, 1991) moved from garage pop-punk through to ballads with synth orchestra splashes. The album launched to industry praise, with praise from acts including Jesus and Mary Chain, Primal Scream, Sonic Youth, Yo La Tengo, and Nirvana's Kurt Cobain, but the record did not "set the world alight" as some had expected. In 2003, it was named the 37th best Scottish album by The Scotsman. The Guardian describe the album as integral in helping "to inspire confidence in the Glasgow scene (showing) that bands didn’t have to move south but could let the record industry come to them." The album is attributed by the paper as attributable to the later release of Glaswegian output including Belle and Sebastian's Tigermilk, Mogwai's Young Team, Franz Ferdinand's self-titled arrival, and even Chvrches.

=== Departures and Sittin' Pretty ===
The band's 1989 follow-up, Sittin' Pretty (Chapter 22, 1989) was harder but less eclectic. Reports started to appear in the UK music press that the group was splitting up, and Taylor, Hayward and Simpson all departed.

Eventually it became clear that a new line-up was configuring around original members, McRobbie and Wright (Aggi), now joined by Mitch K Mitchell. This line-up is probably the best known of The Pastels' various phases, and often featured either David Keegan (of Shop Assistants) or Gerard Love (of Teenage Fanclub) on guitar. They signed with the then emerging Domino Records and completed two albums, Mobile Safari (1995) and Illumination (1997), with the musical approach of the latter described as "mellowed and evolved into a form of gently psychedelic off-kilter pop, adorned with orchestral instrumentation." A remix set featured My Bloody Valentine, Jim O'Rourke and others on the album, Illuminati (1998). The band also featured that year on the soundtrack for the film The Acid House.

In 2000, Wright left the group to focus on her career as an illustrator though she still provides artwork for the group. Their next release was the soundtrack to David Mackenzie's The Last Great Wilderness (Geographic, 2003). It featured a track recorded in collaboration with Pulp's Jarvis Cocker. In 2006 The Pastels developed and completed new music for a theatre production by Glasgow-based company, 12 Stars.

In 2009, The Pastels, in collaboration with Tenniscoats from Tokyo, Japan, released an album called Two Sunsets, which critics called "a playful, spontaneous and spellbinding must-hear."

In 2013 they released their first album proper in sixteen years, Slow Summits, again through Domino. The Guardian described the album as "their most complete set since Up for a Bit, with its 10 summery, groovy flute and french-horn-licked songs, trippy in the sense of the kind of trip that lands in a pile of freshly mown grass." The album was shortlisted for the 2013 Scottish Album of the Year Award.

The Pastels now operate their own Geographic Music label through Domino, and are partners in Glasgow's Monorail Music shop.

=== Legacy and influence ===
Despite their contrarian musical approach, the Pastels soon after forming enjoyed an emerging fanzine culture identified with the group's sound and image, and slowly started to influence a new wave of groups, as well as gathering the attention of NME and other UK media. The band features in the book Postcards from Scotland detailing the 1980s and 1990s independent music scene in Scotland. The band Black Tambourine has a love song to Stephen Pastel, "Throw Aggi off the Bridge". Talulah Gosh have a song called Pastels Badge. During the early 2000s the band continued to receive attention, particularly in Japan where they became "incongruously wrapped up in the hype surrounding Britpop in Japan, jostling for position in magazines with the likes of Blur and Manic Street Preachers."

== Band members ==
=== Current ===
- Stephen McRobbie (or Stephen Pastel) – guitar, vocals (1981–present)
- Mitch K Mitchell – drums, vocals, guitar, keyboards (1989–present)
- Tom Crossley – flute, keyboards (1990s–present)
- John Hogarty – guitar (late 2000s–present)
- Suse Bear – bass (2010s–present)

=== Former ===
- Brian Taylor (or Brian Superstar) – guitar (1981–1992)
- Martin Hayward – bass, vocals (1982–1989)
- Bernice Simpson – drums (1983–1989)
- Annabel Wright (or Aggi) – vocals (1984–2000), keyboards (1984–1990), bass (1990–2000)
- Eugene Kelly – backing vocals, violin, guitar, autoharp (1987–1989)
- David Keegan – guitar (1992–2000)
- Gerard Love – guitar / bass
- Jonathan Kilgour – guitar (1994–1997)
- Norman Blake – guitar, bass
- Sandy Forbes – drums
- Alison Mitchell – trumpet (2003–2020)

=== Contributors ===
- Gerard Love – guitar, bass guitar, drums
- Norman Blake – guitar, bass guitar, vocals
- Colin McIlroy – guitar
- Charlie Dinsdale – drums
- Chris Gordon – drums
- Michael Giudici – bass guitar
- Dean Wareham – guitar
- Maureen McRoberts – saxophone
- Darren Ramsay – trumpet
- Liz Dew – bass

== Discography ==
=== Studio albums ===
- Up for a Bit with The Pastels (1987)
- Sittin' Pretty (1989)
- Mobile Safari (1995)
- Illumination (1997)
- Slow Summits (2013)

=== Compilation albums ===
- Suck On (1988)
- Truckload of Trouble (1994)
- Illuminati (1998)
- Summer Rain (2013)

=== Soundtracks ===
- The Last Great Wilderness (2003)

=== Singles ===
Year	Title	Label	Album
1982	"Songs for Children"	Whaam! (WHAM005)	
1983	"I Wonder Why" / "Supposed to Understand"	Rough Trade (RT 137)	
1984	"Something Going On" / "Stay With Me Until Morning Comes"	Creation (CRE 005)	
1984	"Million Tears"	Creation (CRE 011T)	
1985	"I'm Alright With You	Creation (CRE 023T)	
1986	"Truck Train Tractor" / "Breaking Lines"	Glass (GLASS 48)	
1986	"Crawl Babies"	Glass (GLASS 50)	Up for a Bit with The Pastels
1987	"Comin' Through"	Glass (GLASS 53)	
1989	"Baby You’re Just You"	Chapter 22 (CHAP 37)	Sittin' Pretty
1990	"Different Drum" / "Empty House"	K Records (IPU 14)	
1991	"Speeding Motorcycle" / "Speedway Star"	Paperhouse (PAPER 008)	
1991	"Thru' Your Heart" / "Firebell Ringing"	Paperhouse (PAPER 011)	
1993	"Thank You for Being You" / "Kitted Out"	Paperhouse (PAPER 023)	
1994	"Olympic World of Pastelism"	Domino (RUG18)	
1994	"Yoga"	Domino (RUG28)	Mobile Safari
1995	"Worlds of Possibility"/"Love It's Getting Better" (originally recorded by US band The Groove in 1967 on Wand Records)	Domino (RUG36T)	Mobile Safari
1997	"Unfair Kind of Fame"	Domino (RUG55T)	Illumination
1997	"The Hits Hurt"	Domino (RUG52)	Illumination
1998	"One Wild Moment"	Domino (RUG79T)	Illuminati
2013	"Check My Heart"	Domino (RUG520)	Slow Summits
2020	"Advice To The Graduate"	Domino (RUG1108)	

=== With Jad Fair ===
- Jad Fair and The Pastels – This Could Be the Night EP (Paperhouse, 1991)
- Jad Fair and The Pastels – No. 2 EP (Paperhouse, 1992)

=== With Tenniscoats ===
- The Pastels and Tenniscoats – Two Sunsets (Geographic, 2009)
- The Pastels and Tenniscoats – Vivid Youth / About You (Geographic, 2009)

=== With Sonic Youth ===
- The Pastels and Sonic Youth – Sonic Youth and the Pastels Play The New York Dolls (Glass Modern, 2021)

== See also ==
- Culture in Glasgow
- Music of Scotland
- Creation (record label)
- Glass Records
- C86 compilation
- NME
