= Glass Records =

British independent record label

- Founded: 1981
- Founder: David E. Barker
- Defunct: 1990 – resurrected 2015
- Distributors: Nine Mile, The Cartel
- Country of origin: United Kingdom
- Location: London

Glass Records was a British independent record label which operated from 1981 to 1990, and was resurrected in 2015.

== Glass Vintage 1981–1990 ==
Glass was one of the key London-based indie labels of the 1980s. Early releases focused on artists from Northampton (Religious Overdose, Where's Lisse & The Jazz Butcher), and the Midlands (Bron Area & In Embrace). The label released several records by artists having later associations with other London-based indies: Creation Records (The Jazz Butcher and Nikki Sudden & the Jacobites); Fire Records (Spacemen 3 and The Perfect Disaster). Glass's mainstay acts were The Pastels, In Embrace and The Jazz Butcher. The label also issued material by Bauhaus member David J, and American punk band The Replacements, and the influential Liverpool Ur-grunge Walkingseeds.

Founder David Barker went on to work for Fire Records, creating the Paperhouse label, taking the Walkingseeds with him, and releasing the first Teenage Fanclub album, then moving to Creation Records for 2 years.

== Glass Redux 2015– ==
Glass Records returned in 2015 as Glass Redux, reissuing some of its catalogue, unreleased material, rarities and new material from associated and former artists on the label. With the exception of 3 LPs for Record Store Day 2018, all these releases are on CD. In 2016, Glass launched the Glass Miniature download only imprint.

== Glass Modern 2018– ==
A new imprint was announced in 2018, Glass Modern, ostensibly for new artists and vinyl reissues from cult figures from the international rock'n'roll underground, past, present and future. The first six releases are by The Venus Fly Trap (Icon-GLAMCD001) The Froot (Forbidden Froot-GLAMCD002), on CD and Vinyl reissues by David J (Crocodile Tears and the Velvet Cosh-GLAMLP003), The Velvet Crush (In The Presence of Greatness-GLAMLP004), Thurston Moore (Klangfarbenmelodie.. And The Colorist Strikes Primitiv-GLALP006) and a brand New LP/Cd by David J in collaboration with Detroit PsychRockers Duende: Duende with David J (Oracle of the Horizontal-GLAMLP005/GLAMCD005)

== Glass Records Vintage 1980–1990 discography ==
Albums may be in LP (GLALP, GLASSLP or GLEX), compact disc (GLACD or GLEXCD), or cassette (GLAMC or GLASSMC) format, with singles listed mainly with the GLASS prefix. Mini-albums are listed as MGLALP. Artefacts with the same title under different catalogue entries refer to the same recording, if releases were not always issued in more than one format, leading to apparent gaps in the series. (Note that the first Glass Records single was actually released in 1980, although at that point there were not intended to be any more, thus 1981 is the year given as the beginning of it as an ongoing record label).

Catalogue number	Artist	Title	Year
GLASS 043	The Jazz Butcher	The Human Jungle (7")	1986
GLACD 002	The Jazz Butcher	Bath of Bacon (CD, Album)	1988
GLACD 008	Nikki Sudden & Dave Kusworth	Jacobites (CD, Album)	1984
GLACD 009	The Jazz Butcher	A Scandal in Bohemia/Sex & Travel (CD, Comp)	1986
GLACD 010	David J	Crocodile Tears and the Velvet Cosh (CD, Album)	1985
GLACD 012	Jacobites	Robespierre's Velvet Basement (CD, Album)	1986
GLACD 017	David J	On Glass (CD, Comp)	1986
GLACD 020	The Jazz Butcher Conspiracy	Distressed Gentlefolk (CD, Album)	1986
GLACD 023	The Jazz Butcher	Big Questions (CD, Comp)	1988
GLACD 029	Nikki Sudden & Dave Kusworth : Jacobites	Fortune of Fame (Big Hits & Stereo Landings) (CD, Comp)	1988
GLACD 030	Spacemen 3	Performance (CD, Album)	1988
GLACD034	Walkingseeds	Upwind of Disaster, Downwind of Atonement (CD, Album)	1988
GLAEP 101	David J	Blue Moods Turning Tail (12", EP)	1985
GLAEP 102	Nikki Sudden & Dave Kusworth : Jacobites	Pin Your Heart To Me (12", EP)	1986
GLAEP 103	Outskirts	Down (12")	1986
GLAEP 104	The Jazz Butcher v Max Eider	Conspiracy (12", EP)	1986
GLAEP 105	Spacemen 3	Walkin' With Jesus (12")	1986
GLAEP 106	In Embrace	What's Got into Me? (12", EP)	1987
GLAEP 107	The Perfect Disaster	Hey Hey Hey (12")	1987
GLAEP 108	Spacemen 3	Transparent Radiation (12", EP)	1987
GLAEP 109	The Perfect Disaster	Bluebell (12")	1987
GLAEP110	Walkingseeds	Shaved Beatnik (12")	1989
GLALP 001	In Embrace	Passionfruit Pastels (LP, Album)	1982
GLALP 002	The Jazz Butcher	Bath of Bacon (LP)	1983
GLALP 003	Various	The Pulse of New York (LP, Comp)	1983
GLALP 004	In Embrace	Too (LP, Album)	1983
GLALP 005	Bron Area	The Trees and the Villages (LP, Album)	1983
GLALP 006	The Gadgets	Blue Album (LP, Album)	1983
GLALP 007	Various	Shadow And Substance (The Wonderful World of Glass, Vol. 2) (LP, Comp)	1984
GLALP 008	Nikki Sudden & Dave Kusworth	Jacobites (LP)	1984
GLALP 009	The Jazz Butcher	A Scandal in Bohemia (LP, Album)	1984
GLALP 010	David J	Crocodile Tears and the Velvet Cosh (LP, Album)	1985
GLALP012	Nikki Sudden & Dave Kusworth, Jacobites	Robespierre's Velvet Basement (LP)	1985
GLALP013	Space Negros	Pink Noise (LP)	1985
GLALP 015	Mayo Thompson	Corky's Debt To His Father (LP, Album, RE)	1985
GLALP 017	David J	On Glass (LP, Comp)	1986
GLALP 018	Spacemen 3	Sound of Confusion (LP)	1986
GLALP 019	Various	50,000 Glass Fans Can't Be Wrong – A Glass Records Selection (LP, Comp)	1986
GLALP 020	The Jazz Butcher Conspiracy	Distressed Gentlefolk (LP)	1986
GLALP 021	The Pastels	Up for a Bit with The Pastels (LP, Album)	1987
GLALP 023	The Jazz Butcher	Big Questions (LP, Comp)	1987
GLALP 025	Downy Mildew	Broomtree (LP, Album)	1987
GLALP 026	Spacemen 3	The Perfect Prescription (LP)	1987
GLALP 027	The Perfect Disaster	Perfect Disaster (LP, Album, RE)	1987
GLALP 028	The Membranes	Kiss Ass... Godhead! (LP, Album)	1988
GLALP 029	Nikki Sudden & Dave Kusworth : Jacobites	Fortune of Fame (Big Hits and Broken Biscuits) (LP)	1988
GLALP 030	Spacemen 3	Performance (Album)	1988
GLALP 031	Shadowy Men on a Shadowy Planet	Savvy Show Stoppers (Album)	1988
GLALP034	Walkingseeds	Upwind of Disaster, Downwind of Atonement (LP)	1988
GLALP 035	The Red Crayola	Malefactor, Adé (LP, Album)	1989
GLALP 104	The Jazz Butcher Conspiracy	Distressed Gentlefolk / The Conspiracy LP (2xLP, Comp)	1986
GLAMC 009	The Jazz Butcher	A Scandal in Bohemia/Bath of Bacon (Cass, Comp, Dou)	1984
GLAMC 011	The Jazz Butcher	Sex And Travel/The Gift of Music (Cass, Comp, Dou)	1985
GLAMC 020	The Jazz Butcher Conspiracy	Distressed Gentlefolk (Cass, Album)	1986
GLAMC 021	The Pastels	Up for a Bit with The Pastels (Cass, Album)	1987
GLAMC 023	The Jazz Butcher	Big Questions (Cass, Comp)	1987
GLAMC 026	Spacemen 3	The Perfect Prescription (Cass, Album)	1987
GLASS 001	Glass	New Colours (7")	1980
GLASS 003	Ciaran Harte	Love Is Strange (7")	1981
GLASS 004	Religious Overdose	25 Minutes/Control Addicts (7")	1981
GLASS 006	Richard Formby	Outside The Angular Colony (Cass)	1981
GLASS 007	English Subtitles	Tannoy/Cars on Fire (7", Single)	1981
GLASS 008	Where's Lisse?	Talk Takes Too Long (7")	1981
GLASS 009	Religious Overdose	I Said Go/Alien To You (7")	1981
GLASS 010	Various	The Wonderful World of Glass Vol. 1 (LP, Comp)	1981
Glass 011	Various	Northampton Under Glass (Cass, Comp)	1981
GLASS 012	Bron Area	Different Phrases (12")	1982
GLASS 014	Where's Lisse?	Tutorial (12")	1982
GLASS 017	Kevin Harrison	Fly (12")	1982
GLASS 018	Religious Overdose	The Girl with the Disappearing Head (I've Got To Adjust To It) (12")	1982
GLASS 019	In Embrace	The Initial Caress (12")	1982
GLASS 021	The Cravats	Terminus/Little Yellow Froggy (7")	1982
GLASS 022	Anti Establishment	Future Girl/No Trust (7", Single)	1982
GLASS 023	Anti Establishment	Anti Men (7", Single)	1983
GLASS 024	In Embrace	Sun Brings Smiles (7")	1982
GLASS 025	The Wise Men	Knowledge (7", Single)	1983
GLASS 026	The Gadgets	We Had No Way of Knowing (7")	1983
GLASS 027	The Jazz Butcher	Southern Mark Smith	1983
GLASS 028	Schleïmer...K	Fugitive Kind (12")	1982
GLASS 029	The Tempest	Lady Left This/Attic (7")	1983
GLASS 030	In Embrace	The Living Daylights (7")	1983
GLASS 031	David J and the J-Walkers	The Promised Land (7", Single)	1983
GLASS 033	The Jazz Butcher	Marnie (7")	1984
GLASS 034	In Embrace	Your Heaven Scent (Single)	1984
GLASS 039	David J	I Can't Shake This Shadow of Fear/War Game (7", Single)	1984
GLASS 040	The Jazz Butcher	Roadrunner/Rain (7")	1984
GLASS 041	The Jazz Butcher	Real Men (7", Single, TP)	1985
GLASS 041	The Jazz Butcher	Real Men (7", Single)	1985
GLASS 042	David J	Crocodile Tears and the Velvet Cosh (7", Single)	1985
GLASS 043	The Jazz Butcher	The Human Jungle (7")	1985
GLASS 044	The Doctor's Children	Tomorrow I'll Die (7", Single)	1985
GLASS 045	Jacobites	When The Rain Comes (7", Single)	1986
GLASS 046	The Jazz Butcher and his Sikkorskis from Hell	Hard (7", Single)	1986
GLASS 048	The Pastels	Truck Train Tractor (7")	1986
GLASS 049	The Jazz Butcher	Angels (7")	1986
GLASS 050	The Pastels	Crawl Babies (7", Single)	1987
GLASS 051	In Embrace	A Room Upstairs (7", Single)	1986
GLASS 052	The Membranes	Time-Warp 1991 (Long Live Trad Rock) (7", Single)	1987
GLASS 053	The Pastels	Comin' Through (7", Single)	1987
GLASS 055	The Apartments	The Shyest Time (7")	1988
GLASS 056	The Servants	It's My Turn (7")	1989
GLASS 12031	David J and the J-Walkers	The Promised Land (12", Single)	1983
GLASS 12032	David J	V For Vendetta (12")	1984
GLASS 12033	The Jazz Butcher	Marnie (Miaow Mix) (12")	1984
GLASS 12034	In Embrace	Your Heaven Scent (Plays Hell With Me) (12", EP)	1984
GLASS 12039	David J	I Can't Shake This Shadow of Fear (12", Single)	1984
GLASS 12040	The Jazz Butcher	Roadrunner (12")	1984
GLASS 12041	The Jazz Butcher	Real Men (12")	1985
GLASS 12042	David J	Crocodile Tears and the Velvet Cosh (12", Single)	1985
GLASS 12043	The Jazz Butcher	The Human Jungle (12")	1985
GLASS 12045	Jacobites	When The Rain Comes/Country Girl (12", EP)	1986
GLASS 12046	The Jazz Butcher and his Sikkorskis from Hell	Hard (12")	1986
GLASS 12048	The Pastels	Truck Train Tractor (12", Maxi)	1986
GLASS 12049	The Jazz Butcher	Angels (12")	1986
GLASS 12050	The Pastels	Crawl Babies (12")	1987
GLASS 12051	In Embrace	A Room Upstairs (12")	1986
GLASS 12053	The Pastels	Comin' Through (12")	1987
GLASS 12054	Spacemen 3	Take Me to the Other Side (12")	1988
GLASS 12055	The Apartments	The Shyest Time (12")	1988
GLASS 12056	The Servants	It's My Turn (EP)	1989
GLASSLP 013	English Subtitles	Original Dialogue (LP)	1982
GLASSLP 020	Elliott Sharp	Nots (LP, Album)	1982
GLASSMC 015	Kevin Harrison	Spectro Verdu Est Mort? (Cass, Album)	1981
GLEX 101	The Jazz Butcher	The Gift of Music (LP, Comp)	1985
GLEX 102	In Embrace	Wanderlust (1982 – 1984) (LP, Comp)	1986
GLEXCD 101	The Jazz Butcher	The Gift of Music (CD, Comp)	1988
HMMM001	The Jazz Butcher	Christmas with the Pygmies (7", Fan)	1986
HMMM 002	The Jazz Butcher	Speedy Gonzales (7")	1987
MGLALP 011	The Jazz Butcher	Sex And Travel (12", Mini-album)	1985
MGLALP 014	Outskirts	Heaven's on the Move (12", Mini-album)	1985
MGLALP 016	The Replacements	Boink!! (LP, Mini-album, Comp)	1986
MGLALP 024	Colin Lloyd Tucker	Head (LP, Mini-album)	1987
MGLALP 032	Clay Idols	Every Day Starts Like This (LP, Mini-album)	1988
MGLALP 037	Walkingseeds	Sensory Deprivation Chamber Quartet Dwarf LP (LP)	1989
MGLAMC 016	The Replacements	Boink!! (Cass, Mini-album)	1986

== See also ==
- Lists of record labels
- List of independent UK record labels
