= Felt discography =

- Studio albums: 10
- Compilation albums: 6
- Singles: 11
- Video albums: 1

This is the discography of British indie pop band Felt.

== Albums ==
=== Studio albums ===
Title	Album details	Peak chart positions
Title	Album details	UK Indie
Crumbling the Antiseptic Beauty	Released: January 1982; Label: Cherry Red; Formats: LP	16
The Splendour of Fear	Released: February 1984; Label: Cherry Red; Formats: LP	6
The Strange Idols Pattern and Other Short Stories	Released: 26 October 1984; Label: Cherry Red; Formats: LP	8
Ignite the Seven Cannons	Released: 20 September 1985; Label: Cherry Red; Formats: LP	4
Let the Snakes Crinkle Their Heads to Death	Released: June 1986; Label: Creation; Formats: LP	18
Forever Breathes the Lonely Word	Released: 16 September 1986; Label: Creation; Formats: LP	8
Poem of the River	Released: 22 June 1987; Label: Creation; Formats: LP, MC	6
The Pictorial Jackson Review	Released: May 1988; Label: Creation; Formats: LP, MC	9
Train Above the City	Released: July 1988; Label: Creation; Formats: LP	9
Me and a Monkey on the Moon	Released: 13 November 1989; Label: él; Formats: CD, LP	18

=== Compilation albums ===
Title	Album details	Peak chart positions
Title	Album details	UK Indie
Gold Mine Trash	Released: 1 September 1987; Label: Cherry Red; Formats: CD, LP, MC	11
Bubblegum Perfume	Released: April 1990; Label: Creation; Formats: CD, LP	—
Absolute Classic Masterpieces	Released: April 1992; Label: Cherry Red; Formats: CD, MC	—
Absolute Classic Masterpieces Volume II	Released: October 1993; Label: Creation; Formats: 2xCD	—
Felt Box	Released: 1993; Label: Cherry Red; Formats: 4xCD box set	—
Stains on a Decade	Released: May 2003; Label: Cherry Red; Formats: CD	—
"—" denotes releases that did not chart.

=== Video albums ===
Title	Album details
A Declaration	Released: August 2003; Label: Cherry Red; Formats: DVD

== Singles ==
Title	Year	Peak chart positions
Title	Year	UK Indie
"Index"	1979	—
"Something Sends Me to Sleep"	1981	—
"My Face Is on Fire" / "Trails of Colour Dissolve"	1982	— 21
"Penelope Tree"	1983	22
"Mexican Bandits" / "The World Is as Soft as Lace"	1984	28
"Sunlight Bathed the Golden Glow"	1984	6
"Primitive Painters"	1985	1
"Ballad of the Band"	1986	12
"Rain of Crystal Spires"	1986	11
"The Final Resting of the Ark"	1987	10
"Space Blues"	1988	9
"—" denotes releases that did not chart.
