= Bubblegum Perfume =

Compilation album by Felt
- Released: April 1990
- Genres: Indie pop, jangle pop
- Label: Creation
- Producers: John Leckie, Robin Guthrie, Joe Foster, Mayo Thompson, John Rivers

Felt chronology
Me and a Monkey on the Moon (1989)	Bubblegum Perfume (1990)	Absolute Classic Masterpieces (1992)

Reissue
- 2011 Reissue Cover

Professional ratings
Review scores
Source	Rating
AllMusic	4.5/5 stars
The Guardian	3/5 stars
Melody Maker	(favourable)
Record Collector	4/5 stars
Select	3/5 medals

Bubblegum Perfume is the second compilation album by English alternative rock band Felt, released in 1990. It collects tracks from the band's singles and albums recorded for Creation Records between 1986 and 1988. Tracks 5, 8, 13, 16 and 19 are instrumental.

In a review for Melody Maker, Bob Stanley described the album as "an excellent Felt primer for the uninitiated."

In 2011 Bubblegum Perfume was reissued by Cherry Red with three changes to the track listing: track 12 was replaced by "Tuesday's Secret", track 14 by "Female Star", and track 15 by the instrumental "Fire Circle".

== Track listing ==
All tracks are written by Lawrence, except where noted.

1990 Creation track listing
No.	Title	Writer(s)	Original release	Length
1.	"I Will Die with My Head in Flames"	Lawrence, Gary Ainge	"Rain of Crystal Spires" single (1986)	1:32
2.	"Stained-Glass Windows in the Sky"		Poem of the River (1987)	1:56
3.	"I Didn't Mean to Hurt You"		"Ballad of the Band" single (1986)	2:34
4.	"Space Blues"		"Space Blues" single (1988)	2:23
5.	"Autumn"	Martin Duffy	"The Final Resting of the Ark" single (1987)	1:50
6.	"Be Still"	Dennis Wilson, Stephen Kalinich	"Space Blues"	3:13
7.	"There's No Such Thing as Victory"		"The Final Resting of the Ark"	2:17
8.	"Magellan"	Duffy	"Ballad of the Band"	1:56
9.	"The Final Resting of the Ark"		"The Final Resting of the Ark"	2:39
10.	"Sandman's on the Rise Again"		"Rain of Crystal Spires"	1:48
11.	"Don't Die on My Doorstep"		The Pictorial Jackson Review (1988)	2:17
12.	"A Wave Crashed on Rocks"		Forever Breathes the Lonely Word (1986)	2:51
13.	"Book of Swords"	Duffy, Ainge	Train Above the City (1988)	2:18
14.	"Declaration"		Poem of the River	1:43
15.	"Gather Up Your Wings And Fly"		Forever Breathes the Lonely Word	3:53
16.	"The Darkest Ending"		The Pictorial Jackson Review	3:02
17.	"Bitter End"		The Pictorial Jackson Review	2:33
18.	"Rain of Crystal Spires"		Forever Breathes the Lonely Word	3:54
19.	"Voyage to Illumination"	Duffy	Let the Snakes Crinkle Their Heads to Death (1986)	1:18
20.	"Ballad of the Band"		"Ballad of the Band"	2:48

2011 Cherry Red reissue alternate track listing
No.	Title	Original release	Length
12.	"Tuesday's Secret"	"Space Blues"	2:32
14.	"Female Star"	"Space Blues"	2:08
15.	"Fire Circle"	"The Final Resting of the Ark"	1:55

== Personnel ==
Felt

- Lawrence
- Martin Duffy
- Marco Thomas
- Mick Bund
- Gary Ainge

with

- Tony Willé
- Neil Scott
- Rose McDowell
- Richard Thomas
- Francis Sweeney
- Philip King
- Mick Travis
