= Back in Denim =

Studio album by Denim
- Released: 11 November 1992
- Recorded: May 1990–July 1992
- Studio: Bark, RAK, Abbey Road, London
- Genre: Glam rock, pop
- Length: 49:51
- Label: Boy's Own Recordings
- Producer: John Leckie, Brian O'Shaughnessy

Denim chronology
Back in Denim (1992)	Denim on Ice (1996)

Back in Denim is the debut album by British rock band Denim.

== Background ==
British rock band Felt broke-up in 1989, while frontman Lawrence had been living in Brighton. Finding Brighton to be unpleasant, he moved to New York in early 1990. Lawrence soon started to reminisce about his childhood in the 1970s. He proceeded to visit a pawn shop and buy a guitar, which he would use to compose Back in Denim. He eventually grew homesick and soon moved to London. Lawrence formed Denim with a variety of "session men and ageing glitter-rockers", several of whom were members of The Glitter Band. Lawrence had been receiving calls from major labels, but decided to sign with dance-oriented record label Boy's Own Recordings, who had signed a distribution deal with London Records. His decision to sign with them was based on his notion that "rock music was finished, and DJs could get our records into the charts."

== Production and composition ==
While Felt's albums were recorded with a minuscule budget for small independent labels, Lawrence had "the chance to make the album I'd always wanted" for a major label. Between May 1990 and July 1992, Back in Denim was recorded and mixed with producer John Leckie. (Note: Lawrence had worked with Leckie previously on Felt's The Strange Idols Pattern and Other Short Stories (1984), which Leckie produced and engineered.) At one point, Lawrence was banned from the studio and had pushed Leckie to breaking point, which resulted in him exclaiming: "I've worked with Phil Spector and John Lennon and Syd Barrett, but I can't take this any more. You're madder than any of them." Eventually, before threatening to disown the recordings, he finished the proceedings with Brian O'Shaughnessy. The amount of money that went into making the album had made Boy's Own Recordings go bankrupt.

The album's sound has been described as glam rock and pop. Tim Sendra of AllMusic claimed that for Back in Denim, Lawrence "channeled his love of simple punk, huge hooks, novelty songs, and slagging everyone". Mojo review Roy Wilkinson commented that the album's "wistful examination of Britain and knowing adoption of pop styles from other eras" laid the groundwork for Britpop. The album was complete with "glam and pop hooks machined to perfection with the best in 1990s recording science". "Middle of the Road" features a sample of Middle of the Road's version of "Chirpy Chirpy Cheep Cheep".

== Release and reception ==
Professional ratings
Review scores
Source	Rating
AllMusic	4.5/5 stars
The Guardian	5/5 stars
Stylus Magazine	A

It was released in November 1992 on Boy's Own Recordings. London Records wanted to release the album's title track as a single, but Lawrence requested to re-record the song's chorus, to which London Records cut funding for further studio time. "Middle of the Road" was released as a single, with the B-sides "Ape Hangers", "Robin's Nest", and an instrumental version of "Ape Hangers" titled "The Great Grape Ape-Hangers", in January 1993.

The album was received well by critics but was commercially poor. Trouser Press wrote that "Denim is so well-made and sublimely thought through that even indefensible perversity suits it fine."

In retrospect, Lawrence commented "The tills were closed. [...] This was my masterpiece and I would fight to death to get it right. If that meant it was going to end up selling 25 copies, then that was the way it had to be." The album was reissued in May 2006 on West Midland's Records, a subsidiary of Cherry Red. Norwegian band Turbonegro covered "Back in Denim" as a bonus track at 2007 album Retox.

In 2017, Pitchfork ranked Back in Denim at number 50 in their list of "The 50 Best Britpop Albums".

== Track listing ==
All songs written by Lawrence.

1. "Back in Denim" – 3:59
2. "Fish and Chips" – 3:17
3. "Bubblehead" – 4:43
4. "Middle of the Road" – 4:12
5. "The Osmonds" – 8:08
6. "I Saw the Glitter on Your Face" – 3:34
7. "American Rock" – 6:26
8. "Livin' on the Streets" – 4:31
9. "Here Is My Song for Europe" – 3:41
10. "I'm Against the Eighties" – 7:20
