= Stains on a Decade =

Compilation album by Felt
- Released: May 2003
- Genre: Post-punk, indie pop
- Length: 43:49
- Label: Cherry Red
- Producer: John A. Rivers, Robin Guthrie, John Leckie

Felt chronology
Absolute Classic Masterpieces Volume II (1993)	Stains on a Decade (2003)

Professional ratings
Review scores
Source	Rating
AllMusic	4.5/5 stars
The Guardian	(favourable)
Pitchfork	(8.7/10)
Uncut	(5/5)

Stains on a Decade is the fifth compilation album by English alternative rock band Felt, released in 2003. A career-spanning collection, it contains tracks from the band's singles released between 1981 and 1988, with one album-track exception: "Dismantled King Is Off the Throne".

"Sunlight Bathed the Golden Glow" as it appears here is the original single, and is different from the version on the band's third album. The version of "Fortune" here is a re-recording of the song from their first album.

== Track listing ==
All tracks are written by Lawrence, except where noted.

No.	Title	Length
1.	"Something Sends Me to Sleep"	2:53
2.	"Trails of Colour Dissolve"	3:06
3.	"Penelope Tree"	2:58
4.	"Sunlight Bathed the Golden Glow" (single version)	3:14
5.	"Fortune" (re-recorded version)	3:32
6.	"Dismantled King Is Off the Throne"	2:46
7.	"Primitive Painters"	6:00
8.	"Ballad of the Band"	2:46
9.	"I Didn't Mean to Hurt You"	2:33
10.	"I Will Die with My Head in Flames"	1:34
11.	"Sandman's on the Rise Again"	1:50
12.	"The Final Resting of the Ark"	2:40
13.	"There's No Such Thing as Victory"	2:20
14.	"Be Still"	3:15
15.	"Space Blues"	2:23

== Personnel ==
Felt

- Gary Ainge
- Lawrence
- Marco Thomas
- Martin Duffy
- Maurice Deebank
- Mick Lloyd
- Nick Gilbert

With Help From

- Elizabeth Fraser
- Frank Sweeney
- John Rivers
- Neil Scott
- Richard Thomas
- Rose McDowall
- Tony Race
