= Instant Wigwam and Igloo Mixture =

Studio album by Go-Kart Mozart
- Released: 20 December 1999
- Genre: Synthpop, novelty rock, glam rock
- Length: 30:31
- Label: West Midlands Records
- Producer: Brian O'Shaughnessy, Brian Pugsley

Go-Kart Mozart chronology
Instant Wigwam and Igloo Mixture (1999)	Tearing Up the Album Chart (2005)

Professional ratings
Review scores
Source	Rating
AllMusic	4/5 stars
NME	7/10 stars

Instant Wigwam and Igloo Mixture is the debut album by the band Go-Kart Mozart. It was released in 1999 on West Midlands Records, a subsidiary of Cherry Red. It was former Felt and Denim frontman Lawrence's first album under the alias Go Kart Mozart. Its cover features a shot of Birmingham's Bull Ring Centre as built in 1964, shortly before it was redeveloped.

The track "Today" is an instrumental cover of the song "Windy", renamed in homage to the Today show hosted by Bill Grundy, which had used it as its theme tune.

Elefant Records released a version in Spain with an exclusive song, "Elephant Trunk," between "Today" and "Wear Your Foghat with Pride."

== Track listing ==
All songs written by Lawrence, except where noted.

1. "Mandrax for Minx Cats"
2. "We're Selfish and Lazy and Greedy"
3. "Here Is a Song"
4. "Sailor Boy"
5. "City Synthesis"
6. "Drinkin' Um Bongo"
7. "Mrs. Back-to-Front and the Bull Ring Thing"
8. "Hip Op"
9. "Plead With the Man"
10. "Wendy James"
11. "Plug-In City"
12. "Depleted Soul"
13. "She Tore It Up and Walked Away"
14. "Today" (Ruthann Friedman)
15. "Wear Your Foghat with Pride"
16. "Fluff on the Mallow"
