= Pop-Up! Ker-Ching! and the Possibilities of Modern Shopping =

Studio album by Mozart Estate
- Released: 27 January 2023
- Studio: Hackney Road, East London
- Genre: Glam rock, synthpop
- Length: 39:50
- Label: West Midlands
- Producer: Lawrence

Mozart Estate chronology
Mozart's Mini-Mart (2018)	Pop-Up! Ker-Ching! and the Possibilities of Modern Shopping (2023)

Pop-Up! Ker-Ching! and the Possibilities of Modern Shopping is the fifth studio album by Mozart Estate, the musical project of former Felt and Denim frontman Lawrence. It is the first album to be released under the moniker after changing from the band's original name Go-Kart Mozart. It was released on January 27, 2023, on Lawrence's West Midlands Records, a subsidiary of Cherry Red.

Lawrence has stated that the album's main theme is about consumerism and shopping: "Walking around in my spare time I’m exposed to people who shop constantly. That is what my life is about: shopping and watching shoppers." An original working title for the album was Poundland and the Possibilities of Modern Shopping. The album includes a re-recording of "Relative Poverty", which previously appeared on the band's previous album Mozart's Mini-Mart, and was released as a 10" single prior to the album's release.

== Track listing ==
Pop-Up! Ker-Ching! and the Possibilities of Modern Shopping track listing
No.	Title	Writer(s)	Length
1.	"I'm Gonna Wiggle"	Lawrence	2:26
2.	"Relative Poverty"	Lawrence, Terry Miles	3:00
3.	"Lookin' Thru Glass"	Lawrence, Miles	2:51
4.	"Poundland"	Lawrence, Miles	1:44
5.	"Four White Men in a Black Car"	Lawrence	1:51
6.	"Pretty Boy"	Kenny Young, Herbie Armstrong	2:25
7.	"I Wanna Murder You"	Lawrence	2:12
8.	"Vanilla Gorilla"	Lawrence, Miles	2:36
9.	"And Now the Darkest Times are Here"	Lawrence, Tim Benton	2:33
10.	"Pink and the Purple"	Lawrence	2:05
11.	"Flanca for Mr. Flowers"	Herbie Flowers, Roger Greenaway	3:10
12.	"When the Harridans Came to Call"	Lawrence, Miles	2:13
13.	"Honey"	Adam Faith, David Courtney	3:10
14.	"Record Store Day"	Lawrence	2:17
15.	"Doin' the Brickwall Crawl"	Lawrence, Miles	2:32
16.	"Before and After the Barcode"	Lawrence, WH Smiffy	2:45

== Charts ==
Chart performance for Pop-Up! Ker-Ching! and the Possibilities of Modern Shopping
Chart (2023)	Peak position
Scottish Albums (OCC)	15
UK Independent Albums (OCC)	8
