= Mozart's Mini-Mart =

Studio album by Go-Kart Mozart
- Released: 23 February 2018
- Genre: Glam rock; synthpop
- Length: 34:11
- Label: West Midlands
- Producer: Ian Button; Lawrence

Go-Kart Mozart chronology
On the Hot Dog Streets (2012)	Mozart's Mini-Mart (2018)	Pop-Up! Ker-Ching! and the Possibilities of Modern Shopping (2023)

Professional ratings
Aggregate scores
Source	Rating
Metacritic	83/100
Review scores
Source	Rating
AllMusic	4/5 stars
Classic Rock	4/5 stars
Record Collector	5/5 stars
The Sunday Times	5/5 stars

Mozart Estate Present Go-Kart Mozart in Mozart's Mini-Mart (shortened to Mozart's Mini-Mart) is the fourth studio album by Go-Kart Mozart, the musical project of former Felt and Denim frontman Lawrence. It was released on 23 February 2018 on West Midlands Records, a subsidiary of Cherry Red.

The album was originally envisioned by Lawrence as a mini-album, and was intended to be a companion piece to the band's previous album On the Hot Dog Streets. However, the mini-album was never completed in time, and was later extended into a 17-track full-length album.

The album was produced by Ian Button, formerly of the band Death in Vegas. The album's release coincided with the remastered editions of the first five Felt albums by Cherry Red on CD and vinyl.

== Accolades ==
At the end of 2018, Mozart's Mini-Mart featured on several publications' list of the year's best albums, ranking on such lists by Q (34th), Uncut (35th), Mojo (54th), and Louder Than War (57th).

== Track listing ==
All songs written by Lawrence and Terry Miles, except where noted.

1. "Anagram of We Sold Apes" – 2:35
2. "When You're Depressed" – 2:55
3. "Relative Poverty" – 2:52
4. "Zelda's in the Spotlight" – 2:47
5. "Big Ship" (Raymond Froggatt) – 2:23
6. "Nub-End in a Coke Can" – 0:55
7. "A Black Hood on His Head" – 2:25
8. "Facing the Scorn of Tomorrow's Generation" – 1:34
9. "A New World" (Roger Whittaker) – 2:19
10. "I'm Dope" – 1:27
11. "Crokadile Rokstarz" – 2:00
12. "Knickers on the Line by 3 Chord Fraud" – 1:09
13. "Chromium-Plated We're So Elated" – 3:09
14. "Man of Two Sides" – 0:49
15. "Farewell to Tarzan Harvey" – 1:22
16. "A Ding Ding Ding Ding Dong!!" – 2:48
17. "Anagram 1st Prize Reprize" – 0:42
