= Gold Mine Trash =

Compilation album by Felt
- Released: 1 September 1987
- Genre: Jangle pop, post-punk, indie pop
- Length: 33:54
- Label: Cherry Red
- Producer: John A. Rivers, John Leckie, Robin Guthrie

Felt chronology
Poem of the River (1987)	Gold Mine Trash (1987)	The Pictorial Jackson Review (1988)

Reissue
- 2005 Reissue Cover

Professional ratings
Review scores
Source	Rating
AllMusic	4/5 stars

Gold Mine Trash is the first compilation album by English alternative rock band Felt, released in 1987. It collects tracks from the band's singles and albums recorded for Cherry Red between 1981 and 1985. The cover photo shows a detail from the Throne Hall of Neuschwanstein Castle in Germany.

Tracks 3 and 5 were unreleased versions recorded as demos for Blanco y Negro Records. The version of "Fortune" here is a re-recording of the song from the band's first album.

== Track listing ==
All tracks are written by Lawrence and Maurice Deebank.

No.	Title	Length
1.	"Something Sends Me To Sleep"	2:56
2.	"Trails Of Colour Dissolve"	3:09
3.	"Dismantled King Is Off The Throne" (demo)	2:52
4.	"Penelope Tree"	3:02
5.	"Sunlight Bathed the Golden Glow" (demo)	3:11
6.	"Crystal Ball"	2:56
7.	"The Day The Rain Came Down"	2:31
8.	"Fortune" (re-recorded version)	3:38
9.	"Vasco Da Gama"	3:41
10.	"Primitive Painters"	5:58

== Personnel ==
Felt 1980–1985

- Maurice Deebank
- Nick Gilbert
- Lawrence
- Gary Ainge
- Mick Lloyd
- Martin Duffy

with

- Elizabeth Fraser – vocals on "Primitive Painters"
