= The Pictorial Jackson Review =

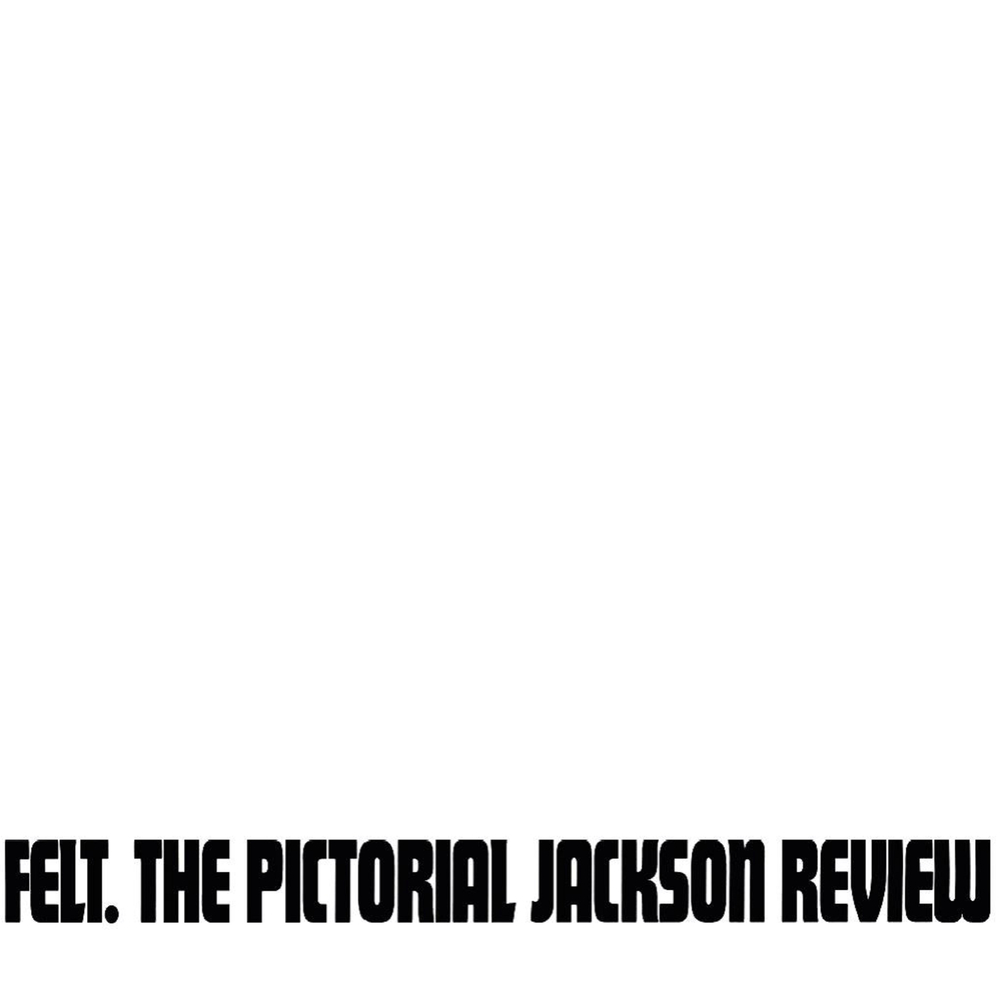

Studio album by Felt
- Released: March 1988
- Genre: Indie pop
- Length: 35:20; 24:40 (2018 reissue)
- Label: Creation
- Producer: Joe Foster

Felt chronology
Gold Mine Trash (1987)	The Pictorial Jackson Review (1988)	Train Above the City (1988)

Professional ratings
Review scores
Source	Rating
AllMusic	4/5 stars

The Pictorial Jackson Review is the eighth album by English alternative rock band Felt, released in 1988. The name of the album is a play on the character Pictorial Review Jackson from Jack Kerouac's novel Pic.

Unusually, the first side of the record consisted of short indie pop songs with the second side containing just two instrumentals by keyboardist Martin Duffy. The tracks were originally demo recordings but they were judged good enough to release by label head Alan McGee.

In 2018, the album was remastered with a revised tracklisting, replacing Duffy's instrumentals with the previously unreleased recordings "Tuesday's Secret" and "Jewels are Set in Crowns" (which Lawrence would later adapt as "Ape Hangers" for his next band Denim). A much more realized version of "Tuesday's Secret" was originally released on the Space Blues EP in the 1980s before this other version saw the light of day on the remastered 2018 version of this album.

== Track listing ==
All songs written by Lawrence, except where noted.

No.	Title	Length
1.	"Apple Boutique"	2:00
2.	"Ivory Past"	2:04
3.	"Until the Fools Get Wise"	2:37
4.	"Bitter End"	2:37
5.	"How Spook Got Her Man"	1:42
6.	"Christopher Street"	2:28
7.	"Under a Pale Light"	4:19
8.	"Don't Die on My Doorstep"	2:22
9.	"Sending Lady Load" (Duffy)	12:10
10.	"Darkest Ending" (Duffy)	3:01

2018 reissue
No.	Title	Length
1.	"Apple Boutique"	1:58
2.	"Ivory Past"	2:01
3.	"Until the Fools Get Wise"	2:34
4.	"How Spook Got Her Man"	1:39
5.	"Bitter End"	2:34
6.	"Tuesday's Secret"	2:29
7.	"Christopher Street"	2:25
8.	"Jewels Are Set in Crowns"	2:26
9.	"Under a Pale Light"	4:16
10.	"Don't Die on My Doorstep"	2:18

== Personnel ==
- Lawrence – vocals, guitar, Ace Tone electronic organ
- Marco Thomas – guitar
- Martin Duffy – organ, piano, Fender Rhodes bass piano
- Mick Bund – bass
- Gary Ainge – drums
