= Pic =

PIC or pic may refer to:

== Places ==
- Penbay International Circuit, or PIC, a motor track circuit in Pingtung County, Taiwan
- Pic River, in Ontario, Canada
- Picayune (Amtrak station) (Amtrak station code PIC), Mississippi, United States
- Pic, abbreviation for Pictor, a southern constellation
- Pacific island countries

== People ==
- Anna Pic (born 1978), French politician
- Anne-Sophie Pic (born 1969), French cook
- Charles Pic (born 1990), French Formula One driver
- Maurice Pic (1866–1957), French entomologist
- Tina Pic (born 1966), American racing cyclist

== Enterprises and organizations ==
- PIC, a mark used by the former Phoenix Iron Company
- Pickleball International Committee, a governing body for the sport of pickleball
- Poison information center, a medical facility
- Prostitution Information Center, an organization in the Netherlands
- Public Investment Corporation, a South African state-owned asset management firm

== Government and politics ==
- Palestinian Information Center, a news website
- Partido Independiente de Color, a former Cuban political party
- Peace Implementation Council, an international body charged with a peace plan for Bosnia and Herzegovina
- Population Investigation Committee, a United Kingdom social research group founded in 1936
- Provincial Iraqi Control, an objective of the Iraqi Government and Multi-National Forces in Iraq
- Prison–industrial complex, attribution of the U.S.'s high incarceration rate to profit
- Presidential Inaugural Committee, in the U.S.
- Pakistan Information Commission

== Law and policy ==
- Plan inclusive counterplan, a term in policy debate
- Presubscribed interexchange carrier, or predesignated interexchange carrier, the long-distance telephone company to which calls from a subscriber line are routed by default
- Prior informed consent, a legal condition

== Medicine and biochemistry ==
- Peripherally inserted central catheter, an intravenous access
- Pre-integration complex, a complex of proteins and genetic material used by the virus HIV
- Transcription preinitiation complex, a large complex of proteins necessary for transcription of protein-coding genes in eukaryotes

== Technology ==
- Particle-in-cell, a technique used to solve certain partial differential equations
- Personal Internet Communicator, a 2004 consumer device designed for low-cost access to the internet
- Photonic integrated circuit, a device that integrates multiple photonic functions
- pic language, a domain-specific language for specifying diagrams
- PIC microcontroller, a family of products made by Microchip Technology
- PICtor PIC image format, a file format developed in the 1980s for PCPaint
- Pixar Image Computer, a 1980s high-end graphics computer
- Plastic identification code, a symbol used to identify types of plastic for recycling
- "Plastic-insulated conductor", a common type of electrical wire or cable
  - Here the "P" in the "PIC" acronym is often taken to represent words or phrases besides, or in addition to, "plastic". Frequently these are various types of plastic, as the names of many begin with poly-.
- Polymorphic inline cache, a virtual machine optimization technology
- Position-independent code, machine instruction code that executes properly regardless of where in memory it resides
- Programmable integrated circuit, an electronic component
- Programmable interrupt controller, an integrated circuit type

== Other uses ==
- Paramedic in command, the paramedic supervising the medical operations of an ambulance or emergency scene
- Particulate inorganic carbon, found in the ocean
- Paid-in capital, contributed to a corporation by investors on top of the par value of capital stock
- Pharmaceutical Inspection Convention, an international instrument between countries and pharmaceutical inspection authorities
- Philippine Independent Church, a Christian denomination
- Pic (novel), 1971, by Jack Kerouac
- Picard group, in algebraic geometry
- Piccadilly line, or "The Pic", on the London Underground
- Pilot in command, the person aboard an aircraft responsible for its operation and safety during flight
- PIC, an abbreviation used in fandom for the American television series Star Trek: Picard
- ICAO airline code for Pacific Airlines

== See also ==
- Picture (common abbreviation)
- - (a common beginning to French mountain peak names)
