= See See Rider (band) =

Scottish indie rock group

- Origin: East Kilbride, Scotland
- Genre: Indie rock
- Years active: 1989–1992
- Label: Lazy Records
- Past members: Lewis Chamberlain (vocals, bass); Stephen Sands (guitar); May Rock Marshall (vocals, guitar); Pete Tweedie (drums)
- Website: seeseerider.co.uk

See See Rider were an indie rock group formed in East Kilbride, Scotland, and active between 1989 and 1992, and featuring former members of The Primitives and Felt. The band took their name from the Lead Belly song "C.C. Rider".

== History ==
Originally formed in 1987 after Stephen Sands and May Rock Marshall had relocated to London, the band parted ways with their original guitarist and bassist before settling on a line-up in 1989: Lewis Chamberlain (vocals, bass), Stephen Sands (guitar), May Rock Marshall (vocals, guitar), and ex-Primitives drummer Pete Tweedie. The band signed to Wayne Morris's Lazy Records label, home of The Primitives and My Bloody Valentine, securing support slots on tours by both Lloyd Cole, The Jesus and Mary Chain and Birdland. The Mary Chain's Douglas Hart was drafted in to play on the band's early recordings, with debut EP "She Sings Alone" issued in March 1990, Steve Lamacq describing them as "darkly enticing". The band was beset by misfortune, including a motorcycle accident affecting Marshall, and a broken ankle for Sands, delaying a follow-up to "She Sings Alone" until the following year, when the band released "Stolen Heart" (described as "a languid love song sculpted from glass"), now with former Felt and Servants guitarist Phil King joining the band. The band were signed to Elektra Records, but after a bust up on stage, drummer Tweedie left, with the band folding in 1992. King went on to join Lush and later joined The Jesus and Mary Chain as touring bass player.

== Discography ==
=== Singles and EPs ===
- "She Sings Alone" 12/CD EP (26 March 1990) Lazy (UK No. 99)
- "Stolen Heart" single (6 May 1991) Lazy (UK No. 96)

=== Albums ===
- Dust Rocks & Flakes (unreleased, but available from the band's website)
