= Absolute Classic Masterpieces =

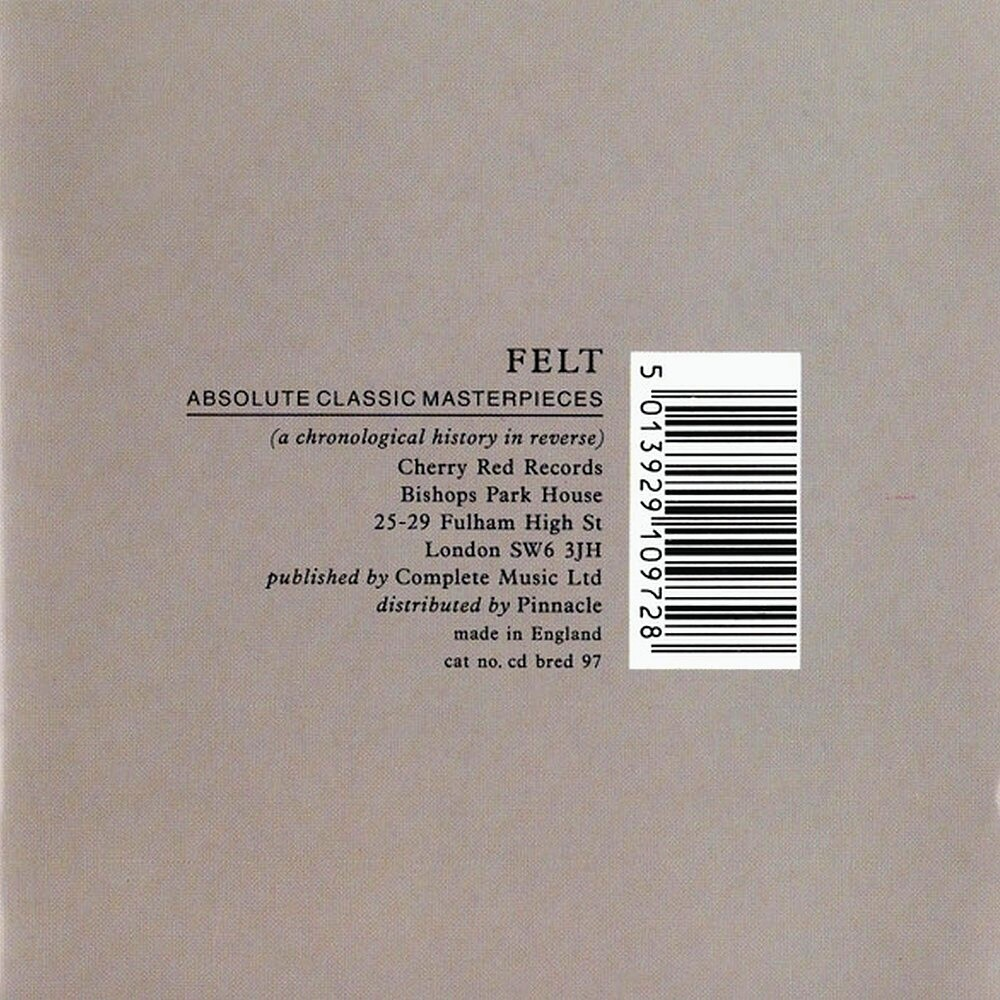

Compilation album by Felt
- Released: April 1992
- Genre: Post-punk, indie pop
- Length: 73:28
- Label: Cherry Red
- Producer: Robin Guthrie, John Leckie, John A. Rivers, Frank Scarth

Felt chronology
Bubblegum Perfume (1990)	Absolute Classic Masterpieces (1992)	Absolute Classic Masterpieces Volume II (1993)

Professional ratings
Review scores
Source	Rating
AllMusic	4.5/5 stars

Absolute Classic Masterpieces is the third compilation album by English alternative rock band Felt, released in 1992. It collects tracks from the band's singles and albums recorded for Cherry Red between 1981 and 1985, with two exceptions: "Dance of Deliverance" from guitarist Maurice Deebank's album, Inner Thought Zone; and "Index", a single recorded and released by leader Lawrence before the band formed properly. Tracks 4, 9, 11, 15 and 18 are instrumental.

The liner notes for the album feature an interview with Felt's original bass player, Nick Gilbert, reflecting on the formation of the band.

"Sunlight Bathed the Golden Glow" as it appears here is the version from the band's third album, and is different from the single. The version of "Fortune" here is a re-recording of the song from their first album.

== Track listing ==
All tracks are written by Lawrence and Maurice Deebank, except where noted

No.	Title	Length
1.	"Primitive Painters"	6:00
2.	"The Day the Rain Came Down"	2:26
3.	"My Darkest Light Will Shine"	2:50
4.	"Textile Ranch"	2:55
5.	"Sunlight Bathed the Golden Glow" (album version)	2:51
6.	"Crystal Ball"	2:53
7.	"Dismantled King Is off the Throne"	2:47
8.	"Fortune" (re-recorded version)	3:31
9.	"Dance of Deliverance"	8:25
10.	"The Stagnant Pool"	8:25
11.	"Red Indians"	1:53
12.	"The World Is as Soft as Lace"	4:15
13.	"Penelope Tree"	2:57
14.	"Trails of Colour Dissolve"	3:05
15.	"Evergreen Dazed"	5:03
16.	"Templeroy"	5:33
17.	"Something Sends Me to Sleep"	2:53
18.	"Index"	4:11

== Personnel ==
- Lawrence – vocals, guitar
- Maurice Deebank – guitar, bass
- Martin Duffy – keyboards
- Gary Ainge – drums, bongos
- Marco Thomas – bass
- Mick Lloyd – bass
- Nick Gilbert – bass
- Elizabeth Fraser – vocals
- Da'ave Elson – bass
- John Rivers – keyboard, synth bass
- Tony Race – drums
