= Absolute Classic Masterpieces Volume II =

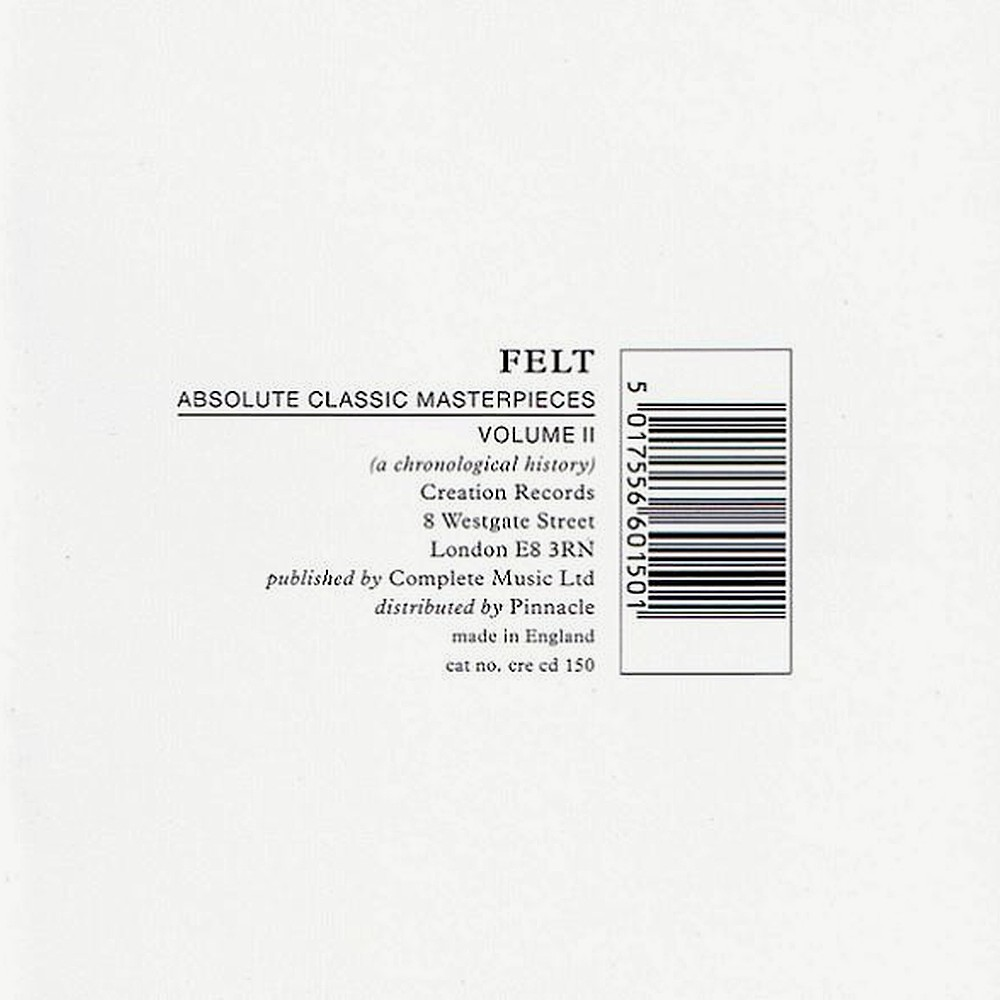

Compilation album by Felt
- Released: April 1993
- Genre: Indie pop
- Length: 70:45
- Label: Creation
- Producer: Joe Foster, John Leckie, John Rivers, Mayo Thompson, Robin Guthrie

Felt chronology
Absolute Classic Masterpieces (1992)	Absolute Classic Masterpieces Volume II (1993)	Stains on a Decade (2003)

Professional ratings
Review scores
Source	Rating
AllMusic	4.5/5 stars
Select	4/5 medals

Absolute Classic Masterpieces Volume II is the fourth compilation album by English alternative rock band Felt, released in 1993. It collects tracks from the band's singles and albums recorded for Creation Records between 1986 and 1988. The album comprises two CDs; the first contains single tracks only and the second contains album tracks. Tracks 3 and 7 of the first disc are instrumental, as are tracks 1–4 and 13–16 of the second disc.

== Track listing ==
All tracks are written by Lawrence, except where noted.

Single tracks
No.	Title	Length
1.	"Ballad of the Band"	2:49
2.	"I Didn't Mean To Hurt You"	2:32
3.	"Magellan"	1:56
4.	"I Will Die with My Head in Flames"	1:33
5.	"Sandman's on the Rise Again"	1:50
6.	"The Final Resting of the Ark"	2:40
7.	"Autumn"	1:52
8.	"There's No Such Thing As Victory"	2:18
9.	"Space Blues"	2:25
10.	"Be Still"	3:15

L.P. tracks
No.	Title	Length
1.	"Song for William S. Harvey"	2:43
2.	"Indian Scriptures"	1:33
3.	"Jewel Sky"	1:00
4.	"Voyage to Illumination"	1:19
5.	"Grey Streets"	3:45
6.	"A Wave Crashed on Rocks"	2:49
7.	"Hours of Darkness Have Changed My Mind"	4:48
8.	"She Lives by the Castle"	6:17
9.	"Stained-Glass Windows in the Sky"	2:06
10.	"Dark Red Birds"	4:19
11.	"Bitter End"	2:35
12.	"Don't Die on My Doorstep"	2:19
13.	"The Darkest Ending"	3:04
14.	"Train Above The City"	3:03
15.	"On Weegee's Sidewalk"	3:38
16.	"Run Chico Run"	2:19

== Personnel ==
- Lawrence – vocals, guitar
- Martin Duffy – organ, piano, backing vocals, synthesizer
- Gary Ainge – drums, bongos
- Marco Thomas – bass, guitar
- John Rivers – backing vocals
- Neil Scott – guitar
- Richard Thomas – saxophone, cymbal
- Robin Guthrie – bass
- Francis Sweeney – viola, violin
- Rose McDowell – vocals
- Tony Willé – guitar
- Mick Bund – bass
