= Soil (disambiguation) =

Soil is a naturally occurring granular covering on the surface of Earth, capable of supporting life.

Soil may also refer to:

- Potting soil, a mixture of organic and mineral materials used as an alternative to soil when growing plants in containers
- Lunar soil, a similar granular covering on the Moon (though without Earth soil's organic components)
- Martian soil, the fine regolith found on the surface of Mars
- Earth (wuxing), an element in Chinese philosophy
- Unwanted substances that make something unclean, such as dirt

== Books and films ==
- Soil (manga), a manga by Atsushi Kaneko
- The Soil (film), 1973 Iranian film

== Music ==
- Soil Stradivarius, a violin fabricated in 1714 by Antonio Stradivari
- Soil (American band), an American metal band
  - Soil (EP), debut EP of American band Soil
- Soil (British band), an indie pop group from Manchester
- The Soil (band), South African group
- soil (album), debut studio album by Serpentwithfeet
- "Soil", a song by System of a Down from their album System of a Down

== Other ==
- Sustainable Organic Integrated Livelihoods, an American nonprofit developmental aid organization
- Soil (journal), an academic journal published by the European Geosciences Union
- Soils (journal), an academic journal published by MDPI
