= Programmable IC =

Programmable IC may refer to:

- Programmable logic device or Programmable integrated circuit
- Programmable Interrupt Controller

== See also ==
- PIC (disambiguation)
