= Ignite the Seven Cannons =

Studio album by Felt
- Released: 20 September 1985
- Genres: Indie pop, dream pop, jangle pop, post-punk
- Length: 36:29
- Label: Cherry Red
- Producer: Robin Guthrie

Felt chronology
The Strange Idols Pattern and Other Short Stories (1984)	Ignite the Seven Cannons (1985)	The Seventeenth Century (1986)

Singles from Ignite the Seven Cannons
- 1. "Primitive Painters" Released: August 1985

Professional ratings
Review scores
Source	Rating
AllMusic	3.5/5 stars
Record Collector	4/5 stars

Ignite the Seven Cannons is the fourth album by English alternative rock band Felt, released in 1985. The album is sometimes referred to as "Ignite the Seven Cannons and Set Sail for the Sun", a phrase which was printed in one place on the original vinyl record.

The album marks the debut of Martin Duffy on keyboards and is the last to feature founding guitarist Maurice Deebank, thus making it the only Felt album to feature both members. It was produced by Robin Guthrie of Cocteau Twins. His bandmate Elizabeth Fraser features prominently as backing vocalist on "Primitive Painters" which became Felt's most successful single, reaching the top of the UK independent singles chart. Tracks 6, 8, 9 and 11 are instrumental.

The 2018 remastered version features six remixed songs, while the tracks on Side Two of the original vinyl release were "focused, edited and 'made symmetrical'" resulting in the loss of "Serpent Shade". Lawrence said "I got a chance to re-mix the vocals on fourth album 'Ignite The Seven Cannons'. I was never happy with the mix that was done by Robin Guthrie of the Cocteau Twins. He kind of ruined some of my best songs, which I’m sure he’d agree with now he’s a lot more experienced!"

== Track listing ==
All songs written by Lawrence and Maurice Deebank. Track 8 was retitled "Elegance" on some reissues.

No.	Title	Length
1.	"My Darkest Light Will Shine"	2:56
2.	"The Day the Rain Came Down"	2:30
3.	"Scarlet Servants"	3:40
4.	"I Don't Know Which Way to Turn"	2:47
5.	"Primitive Painters"	5:58
6.	"Textile Ranch"	2:58
7.	"Black Ship in the Harbour"	3:00
8.	"Elegance (of an Only Dream)"	5:18
9.	"Serpent Shade"	2:10
10.	"Caspian See"	2:04
11.	"Southern State Tapestry"	3:10

2018 reissue
No.	Title	Length
1.	"My Darkest Light Will Shine" (remixed)	2:56
2.	"The Day the Rain Came Down" (remixed)	2:30
3.	"Scarlet Servants" (remixed)	3:40
4.	"I Don't Know Which Way to Turn" (remixed)	2:47
5.	"Primitive Painters"	5:58
6.	"Textile Ranch"	2:58
7.	"Black Ship in the Harbour" (remixed)	3:00
8.	"Elegance in D" (edited)	3:54
9.	"Caspian See" (remixed)	2:04
10.	"Southern State Tapestry"	3:10

== Personnel ==
Felt

- Lawrence – guitar, vocals
- Maurice Deebank – lead guitar
- Marco Thomas – bass guitar
- Martin Duffy – keyboards, backing vocals (tracks 2, 7, and 10)
- Gary Ainge – drums

Additional personnel

- Elizabeth Fraser – backing vocals (tracks 2 and 5)
- Robin Guthrie – production
