= On the Hot Dog Streets =

Studio album by Go-Kart Mozart
- Released: 25 June 2012
- Recorded: 1997–2011
- Genre: Glam rock, synthpop
- Length: 52:44
- Label: West Midlands
- Producer: Brian O'Shaughnessy, Lawrence

Go-Kart Mozart chronology
Tearing Up the Album Chart (2005)	On the Hot Dog Streets (2012)	Mozart's Mini-Mart (2018)

Professional ratings
Review scores
Source	Rating
AllMusic	4/5 stars
BBC	(favourable)
God Is in the TV	4/5 stars
The Guardian	4/5 stars
Uncut	8/10 stars

On the Hot Dog Streets is the third studio album by the band Go-Kart Mozart, the musical project of former Felt and Denim frontman Lawrence. It was released in 2012 on West Midlands Records, a subsidiary of Cherry Red.

Several of the songs originally appeared on the unreleased Denim album Denim Take Over, though have been re-recorded, often with new lyrics. The album's release coincided with the nationwide launch of the acclaimed documentary Lawrence of Belgravia, which followed the album's recording and completion.

== Track listing ==
All songs written by Lawrence.

1. "Lawrence Takes Over" – 3:28
2. "West Brom Blues" – 3:16
3. "The Sun" – 2:09
4. "Retro-Glancing" – 4:05
5. "Come on You Lot" – 3:13
6. "Blowin' in a Secular Breeze" – 4:34
7. "Mickie Made the Most" – 2:30
8. "White Stilettos in the Sand" – 4:01
9. "I Talk with Robot Voice" – 2:16
10. "Synth Wizard" – 3:53
11. "Spunky Axe" – 2:35
12. "Ollie Ollie Get Your Collie" – 3:03
13. "As Long as You Come Home Tonight" – 3:16
14. "Robot Rock" – 0:29
15. "Electrosex" – 3:26
16. "Queen of the Scene" – 3:06
17. "Men Look at Women" – 3:24
