= Crumbling the Antiseptic Beauty =

Studio album by Felt
- Released: February 1982
- Recorded: 1981
- Studios: Woodbine Street Recording Studios, Leamington Spa, Warwickshire
- Genres: Post-punk; dream pop; jangle pop
- Length: 30:43
- Label: Cherry Red
- Producer: John A. Rivers

Felt chronology
Crumbling the Antiseptic Beauty (1982)	The Splendour of Fear (1984)

Crumbling the Antiseptic Beauty is the debut album by the English rock band Felt. Recorded in 1981, it was released in February 1982 by Cherry Red Records. Band leader Lawrence features on the cover.

The opening track "Evergreen Dazed" is instrumental. The second track "Fortune" was later re-recorded and released on the band's 1984 single Sunlight Bathed the Golden Glow. Similarly, a re-recording of "Cathedral" appears on the Primitive Painters single.

== Critical reception ==
Professional ratings
Review scores
Source	Rating
AllMusic	3.5/5 stars
Record Collector	4/5 stars

In an AllMusic album review, critic Tim Sendra rated Crumbling the Antiseptic Beauty with three-and-a-half out five stars noting its "New York City scene of the '70s and the gloomy psychedelia of the '60s" influences, and overall describing it as "skeletal and mysterious". In 2013, the album was ranked at number 34 on Fact magazine's list of The 100 Best Albums of The 1980s.

== Track listing ==
- Lyrics by Lawrence. Music by Lawrence and Maurice Deebank.

Side one
No.	Title	Length
1.	"Evergreen Dazed"	5:07
2.	"Fortune"	3:36
3.	"Birdmen"	6:32

Side two
No.	Title	Length
4.	"Cathedral"	5:20
5.	"I Worship the Sun"	4:16
6.	"Templeroy"	5:35

== Personnel ==
Felt

- Lawrence – vocals, guitar, bass guitar on "I Worship the Sun"
- Maurice Deebank – electric guitar, bass guitar on "Birdmen" and "Templeroy"
- Nick Gilbert – bass guitar on "Fortune" and "Cathedral"
- Gary Ainge – drums
