= Phil King (musician) =

English musician

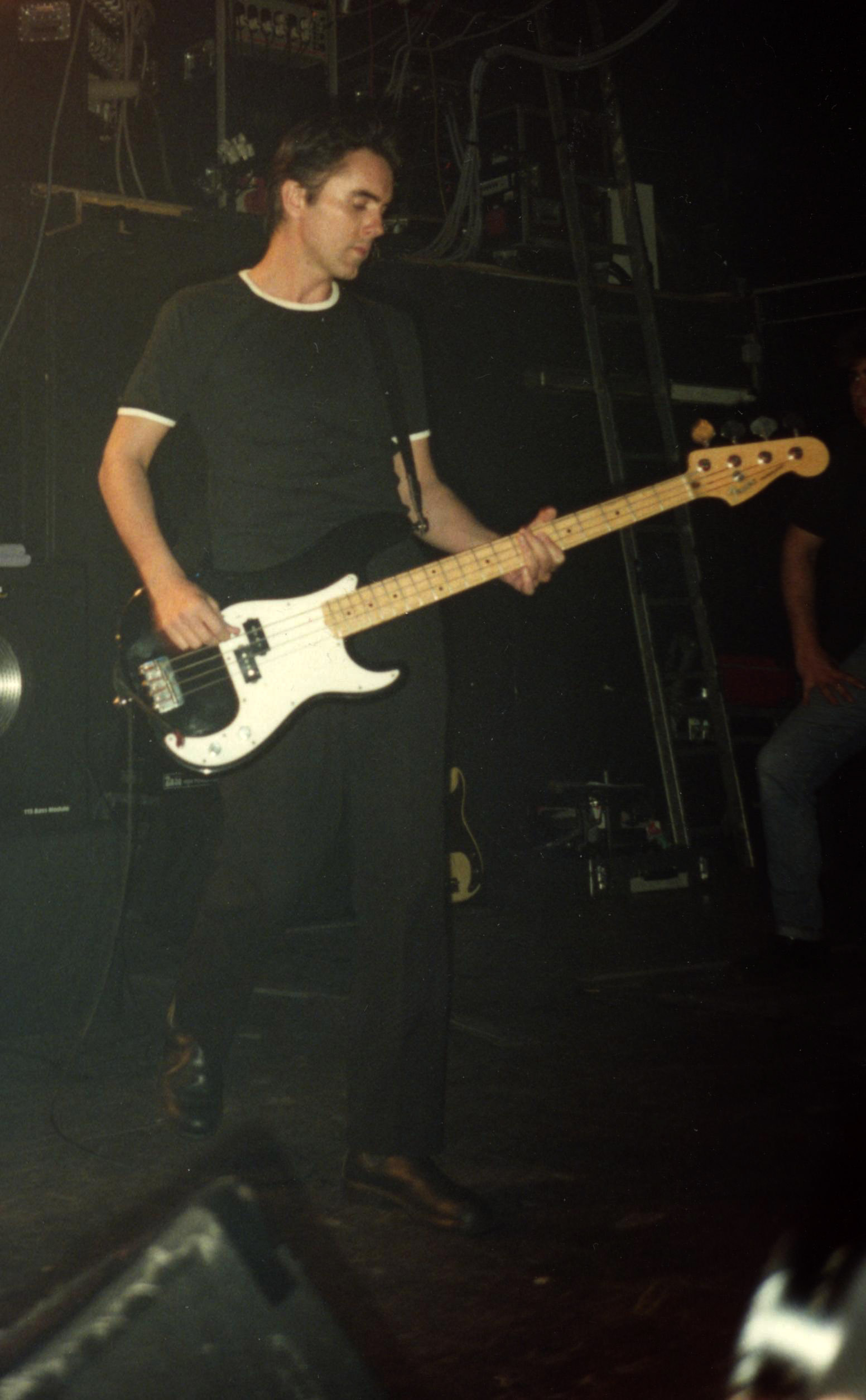
- King on stage in 1994

Background information
- Born: Philip Peter King; 29 April 1960 (age 66); London, England
- Genres: Shoegaze; alternative rock; noise pop
- Instruments: Bass; guitar
- Formerly of: Felt; Lush; The Jesus and Mary Chain; The Fallen Leaves

Philip Peter King (born 29 April 1960) is an English musician perhaps best known for being the bassist of Lush. From 2007 to 2015 he was the touring bass/rhythm guitar player for The Jesus and Mary Chain having previously toured with the group from 1997 to 1998. Arcane Delights refers to King as the "indie Zelig."

== Career ==
Circa 1987 King played bass for Felt, Biff Bang Pow! and The Servants. Featuring on the former's Bubblegum Perfume compilation. He also fronted Apple Boutique that released a single 1987. He appeared playing drums in Primal Scream's 1987 music video for "Gentle Tuesday", the opening track of the group's 1987 album entitled Sonic Flower Groove; chosen because of his haircut. The sound recordings of his drumming were not used for any release. He also worked as a researcher for NME.

=== Lush (1992-97) ===
In 1992, King replaced Lush bassist, Steve Rippon, before the release of Lush's first proper album, Spooky. In a 2008 interview with Von Pip Musical Express, King recalled how he joined Lush: "Miki called me up at work. I was a picture researcher at the NME at the time. I remember having read in the paper the story that Steve was leaving. We arranged to meet up in the not-that-famous-at-the-time pre-Britpop "The Good Mixer" in Camden Town. I lived just round the corner... We of course all got very drunk ...and I was in the band". He adds, "It was a bit of an eyebrow raiser – but also a bit of a relief really – that they didn't even want me to do an audition. In retrospect it made sense, as the most important thing when you're stuck together with someone 16 hours a day is that you get on pretty well".

Lush were added to the Lollapalooza roster in 1992 by its organizer, Perry Farrell, the Jane's Addiction/Porno for Pyros frontman, who personally requested them for his new tour program. King said, "touring America that year was the most amazing thing for me. We had a tour bus, great audiences, and drove the length and breadth of the country". The 1992 Lollapalooza tour also featured The Jesus And Mary Chain. King was with Lush until they officially announced their breakup on 23 February 1997.

=== Post Lush (1997-2010) ===
After Lush, King stated, "I did do a bit of office work here and there – Q, Vox, NME – and was even a film extra for a short period of time".

"I got a call from the NME saying did I want to come into their nice warm offices and work on the gig guide I jumped at the chance. It was while I was there that The Jesus And Mary Chain's management rang asking if I wanted to play bass for them. I turned it down the first time, so disillusioned was I with the music industry; but then thought, "Don't be stupid, it's the Jesus And Mary Chain!" and called back".

From 1997 to 1998, King toured as bassist for The Jesus And Mary Chain. In 1998, he played with Earl Brutus.

He has also played with See See Rider, Welfare Heroine, John's Children, John Howard, Brett Smiley, Jackie DeShannon, and Hangman's Beautiful Daughters.

In 2007, King rejoined The Jesus And Mary Chain as bassist.

=== The Fallen (2011-present) ===
In 2011, Vollwert Records released Paraphernalia featuring Apple Boutique's single, live recordings and demos.

In 2012, King played his Junkshop Synthshop set at The Alibi night club in London.

As of 2013, he also plays bass in The Fallen Leaves and guitar with Jim Reid. Additionally, King freelances as a picture researcher at Uncut magazine.

=== Lush (2015-16) ===
King was part of the Lush reunion between 2015 and 2016. He left the band unexpectedly on 18 October 2016. This caused the cancellation of two shows and a replacement to be recruited for the final show.

"We are very sad to announce the departure of Phil King from the band. As a result, we will no longer be able to appear at the Iceland Airwaves and Rolling Stone Weekender festivals - massive apologies to everyone who was looking forward to seeing us play there. We are in the process of acquiring another bass player and look forward to our final show at Manchester Academy on November 25th."
