= Me and a Monkey on the Moon =

Studio album by Felt
- Released: 13 November 1989
- Genres: Indie pop, pop rock
- Length: 38:24
- Label: él
- Producer: Adrian Borland

Felt chronology
Train Above the City (1988)	Me and a Monkey on the Moon (1989)	Bubblegum Perfume (1990)

Professional ratings
Review scores
Source	Rating
AllMusic	4.5/5 stars
Sounds	4.5/5 stars

Me and a Monkey on the Moon is the tenth and final album by English alternative rock band Felt, released in 1989. It was originally issued on Mike Alway's él label, part of Cherry Red. In a review for Sounds, Roy Wilkinson described it as "perhaps their finest album yet."

== Recording ==
The album was recorded at ICC Studios in Eastbourne between 5 and 14 August 1989, after earlier demos had been recorded in Brighton. Lawrence, Martin Duffy and Gary Ainge had moved to Brighton from Birmingham in 1988; but as Marco Thomas had remained in the Midlands, Robert Young from Primal Scream was invited to play bass on the recording. B. J. Cole visited the sessions for a day to add the pedal steel guitar heard on the tracks "I Can't Make Love to You Anymore" and "New Day Dawning".

== Track listing ==
All songs written by Lawrence.

No.	Title	Length
1.	"I Can't Make Love to You Anymore"	4:35
2.	"Mobile Shack"	3:29
3.	"Free"	4:17
4.	"Budgie Jacket"	3:30
5.	"Cartoon Sky"	2:37
6.	"New Day Dawning"	6:34
7.	"Down an August Path"	4:49
8.	"Never Let You Go"	2:52
9.	"She Deals in Crosses"	3:02
10.	"Get Out of My Mirror"	2:33

== Personnel ==
- Lawrence – vocals
- Martin Duffy – synthesizer, Fender Rhodes electric piano, ARP String Ensemble, piano
- Gary Ainge – drums

with

- John Mohan – lead guitar
- Richard Left – rhythm guitar
- Robert Young – bass
- Rose McDowall – backing vocals
- Pete Astor – backing vocals
- B. J. Cole – pedal steel guitar
