= The Splendour of Fear =

Studio album by Felt
- Released: February 1984
- Recorded: 1983
- Studios: Woodbine Street Studios, Leamington Spa, Warwickshire
- Genres: Post-punk; jangle pop; dream pop
- Length: 30:48
- Label: Cherry Red
- Producer: John A. Rivers

Felt chronology
Crumbling the Antiseptic Beauty (1982)	The Splendour of Fear (1984)	The Strange Idols Pattern and Other Short Stories (1984)

Professional ratings
Review scores
Source	Rating
AllMusic	4/5 stars
Record Collector	3/5 stars
Sounds	5/5 stars

The Splendour of Fear is the second album by English alternative rock band Felt, released in 1984. It is a largely instrumental album based around long guitar passages inspired by classical guitar music, with only tracks 2 and 5 having any lyrics.

The cover art is taken from the poster for the 1966 Andy Warhol/Paul Morrissey film Chelsea Girls, designed by Alan Aldridge. According to Lawrence, he had discovered the image in a library book without knowing who the artist actually was, having assumed it was Warhol himself. Aldridge never approached the band for using it without his permission.

== Track listing ==
All words by Lawrence. All music by Lawrence and Maurice Deebank.

No.	Title	Length
1.	"Red Indians"	1:57
2.	"The World Is as Soft as Lace"	4:19
3.	"The Optimist and the Poet"	7:54
4.	"Mexican Bandits"	3:51
5.	"The Stagnant Pool"	8:29
6.	"A Preacher in New England"	4:18

== Personnel ==
Felt

- Lawrence – rhythm guitar (tracks 1, 2, 3, and 5), vocals (tracks 2 and 5), lead guitar (track 5)
- Maurice Deebank – lead guitar
- Mick Lloyd – bass guitar (tracks 1–5)
- Gary Ainge – drums (tracks 1–5)

Production

- John A. Rivers – production
