= Glassglue =

British experimental pop group

- Origin: London, England
- Genre: experimental pop
- Years active: 2003 to present day
- Label: Klangbad
- Members: Marcel Stoetzler; Matthew Karas; Simon Marsh; Ravi Low-Beer
- Past members: Gianluca Galetti; Emyr Tomos; Andrea Ughetto; Phillip Marks

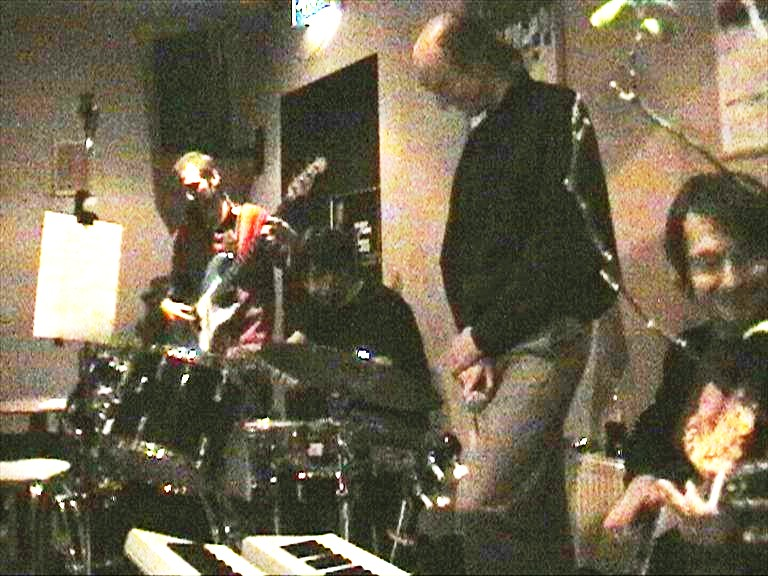
Concert at Biddle Bros Builders, Hackney, 22nd Nov 2005. Left to right: Gianluca Galetti, Emyr Tomos, Marcel Stoetzler, Matthew Karas

Glassglue is a British experimental pop group, formed in London in 2003, by German singer, Marcel Stoetzler, and British multi-instrumentalist, Matthew Karas. After writing and arranging some material and performing as a duo, they recruited Andrea Ughetto to play bass and Ravi Low-Beer to play drums. Andrea, who was involved as a favour to Marcel, was replaced by Gianluca Galetti in 2004. Ravi Low-Beer was replaced by Emyr Tomos in 2005, but returned to the group in 2009.

Primarily, Glassglue are a live act, who have made few recordings, believing that their music was hard to capture on record. When they were founded, all the members lived in or near Hackney, and many of their early performances were there, and they were included in the Hackney Bohemian Library. However, they became well-known on the underground alt-rock and punk circuits in London, including Anti-folk events. They have also attracted the attention of the art scene, having been chosen to play at the Tate Britain for a "Late at the Tate" event in August 2008, and having done several live sessions on Arts Council funded radio station Resonance FM. They were also included in the Subscuta Arts Festival in Portugal in June 2006.

They have been involved in significant events of more established acts in underground music, notably at the re-release event of "Kip of the Serenes", the Joe Boyd produced debut album of Irish psychedelic group Dr. Strangely Strange and a benefit for "Climate of Change" with Tymon Dogg. Their music does not espouse politics, but they have performed several shows in squatted venues, and at benefit shows for the RampART Social Centre in Whitechapel.

In 2010 they recorded their debut album, Fantods, at Faust Studios in Germany, with original Faust keyboard player, Hans-Joachim Irmler, as producer and Andreas Schmid, bass player in The Nightingales as engineer. The album was released by Klangbad Records in 2013, and chosen as one of the five best releases of 2013 by Mudkiss.

Gianluca Galetti left the group in 2016, upon moving to Barcelona, though returned to London for recording sessions, in order to complete the group's second album, which is still in production by Hans-Joachim Irmler, as of August 2017. Simon Marsh joined the group on bass in early 2019.

Matthew Karas played bass guitar and harmonica with The Fallen Leaves, from 2009 to 2021, and was a founding member of Soil.

== Discography ==
=== Singles ===
- "Spiral Stair / If I Were The Sky Right Now" (2008), Kaparte Records
- "Idiot Wind" (2024), Glassglue (digital streaming self-release)

=== Albums ===
- "Fantods" (2013), Klangbad Records
