= Tearing Up the Album Chart =

Studio album by Go-Kart Mozart
- Released: 12 July 2005
- Genre: Rock
- Length: 33:31
- Label: West Midlands
- Producer: Brian O'Shaughnessy

Go-Kart Mozart chronology
| Instant Wigwam and Igloo Mixture (1999) | Tearing Up the Album Chart (2005) | On the Hot Dog Streets (2012) |

Professional ratings
Review scores
| Source | Rating |
|---|---|
| AllMusic | 4/5 stars |
| The Guardian | 4/5 stars |

Tearing Up the Album Chart is an album by the band Go-Kart Mozart. It was released in 2005 on West Midland's Records, a subsidiary of Cherry Red. It was former Felt and Denim frontman Lawrence's second album under the alias Go Kart Mozart. Tracks 5, 8, 9 and 12 were originally recorded for the unreleased Denim album Denim Take Over.

In 2019, Lawrence announced his dissatisfaction with the album, stating it was a collection of demos that were issued during a rough period in his life, and that he plans to remix and re-record the album under the title Renovating The Album Charts. The title of the album was later changed to Tower Block in a Jam Jar, and was released in October 2025.

== Track listing ==
All songs written by Lawrence.

1. "Glorious Chorus" - 2:26
2. "Summer Is Here" - 3:25
3. "Electric Rock & Roll" - 3:45
4. "Listening to Marmalade" - 3:05
5. "At the DDU" - 2:15
6. "On a Building Site" - 2:01
7. "Fuzzy Duck" - 4:43
8. "Transgressions" - 1:44
9. "Delta Echo Echo Beta Alpha Neon Kettle" - 1:56
10. "Donna & the Dopefiends" - 2:48
11. "England & Wales" - 1:40
12. "City Centre" - 3:43
