= Novelty Rock =

Compilation album by Denim
- Released: February 1997
- Recorded: 1990–1997
- Genre: Glam rock, synthpop, Britpop, novelty
- Length: 33:10
- Label: EMI
- Producer: Brian Pugsley, Smithy, Brian O'Shaugnessy

Denim chronology
Denim on Ice (1996)	Novelty Rock (1997)

Professional ratings
Review scores
Source	Rating
AllMusic	4/5 stars
NME	4/10

Novelty Rock is a compilation album by the English rock band Denim. It was released through EMI Records in 1997 and gathers all the B-sides from the "Middle of the Road" and "It Fell off the Back of a Lorry" singles, as well as previously unreleased material plus various cover versions. The Kraftwerk-esque track "Supermarket" had previously been issued as a single through Ice Rink under the name Supermarket in 1992.

In 2018, "The New Potatoes" was selected by Charlie Brooker as the "castaway favourite" of his eight Desert Island Discs. "Ape-Hangers" adapts the melody of a then-unreleased Felt track "Jewels are Set in Crowns".

== Track listing ==
1. "The New Potatoes" – 1:52
2. "On a Chicory Tip" – 3:24
3. "Robin's Nest" – 1:50
4. "Internet Curtains" – 3:22
5. "Snake Bite" – 2:58
6. "Ape-Hangers" – 2:48
7. "The Great Grape Ape-Hangers" – 2:20
8. "Ankle Tattoos" – 2:30
9. "Tampax Advert" – 1:26
10. "Supermarket" – 3:50
11. "Running in the City" – 2:42
12. "I Will Cry at Christmas" – 3:52
