= Denim on Ice =

Studio album by Denim
- Released: 19 February 1996
- Recorded: August 1993 – December 1995
- Genres: New wave, pop, Britpop
- Length: 56:41
- Label: Echo
- Producers: Denim & Brian O'Shaughnessy

Denim chronology
Back in Denim (1992)	Denim on Ice (1996)	Novelty Rock (1997)

Professional ratings
Review scores
Source	Rating
AllMusic	4.5/5 stars
KZSU	Favourable
Melody Maker	Favourable
Select	4/5
Trouser Press	Favourable
NME	5/10

Denim on Ice is the second album by Denim. It was released in 1996. The band went on their first tour supporting Pulp on their stadium tour.

The song "The Great Pub Rock Revival" jokingly namechecks musician Wreckless Eric, who in retaliation penned a scathing response with his group The Hitsville House Band, entitled "Lawrence of Arabia on Ice".

== Track listing ==
All songs written by Lawrence, except where noted.

1. "The Great Pub Rock Revival" – 4:14
2. "It Fell Off the Back of a Lorry" – 3:21
3. "Romeo Jones Is in Love Again" – 1:44
4. "Brumburger" – 4:23
5. "The Supermodels" – 4:02
6. "Shut Up Sidney" – 2:27
7. "Mrs. Mills" – 3:55
8. "Best Song in the World" – 2:44
9. "Synthesisers in the Rain" – 4:59
10. "Job Centre" – 3:00
11. "Council Houses" – 2:39
12. "Glue and Smack" – 3:44
13. "Jane Suck Died in 77" – 3:09
14. "Grandad's False Teeth" – 2:53
15. "Silly Rabbit" – 2:03
16. "Don't Bite Too Much Out of the Apple" – 3:20
17. "Myriad of Hoops" – 2:32
18. "Denim on Ice" – 1:32

== Personnel ==
- Lawrence – Lead Vocals & Lyrics
- Tony Barber – Guitar, Synthesizer
- Bill Bass – Bass, Background Vocals
- K.V. Brake – Engineer
- Paul Brook – Programming
- Kevin Dempsey – Guitar
- Denim – Mixing, Primary Artist, Producer
- Tim Dorney – Electronics, Programming
- Duncan Goddard (Radio Massacre International) – Synthesizer
- Gerry Hogan – Dobro, Guitar, Pedal Steel
- Gerard Johnson – Engineer, Synthesizer, Vocoder
- Alex Jones – Engineer
- Terry Miles – Farfisa Organ, Hammond Organ, Piano, Synthesizer, Background Vocals, Wurlitzer
- Russell Milton – Bass
- Brian O'Shaughnessy – Engineer, Producer, Roland MC-303, Synthesizer
- Peter Phipps (drummer) – Drums (Simmons kit), Background Vocals
- Sean Read – Background Vocals
- John A. Rivers – Mixing, Clap Trap, Programming
- Neil Scott – Guitar, Background Vocals
- Gerry Shephard – Guitar, Background Vocals
- Steve Walwyn – Guitar
- Norman Watt-Roy – Bass
- John Williams – Roland MC-303
- Pete Z. – Mellotron, Hammond Organ, Piano, Roland MC-303, Synthesizer
- Smithy – Synthesizer, 303, piano, guitar, backing vocals, human beatbox, some arranging

== Reception ==
Upon its release, Simon Price of the Melody Maker magazine gave it a favorable review, stating that the album was "possibly the funniest record ever made" and "an act of aesthetic warfare...and commercial suicide". John Sutherland included "Denim on Ice" in a list of "great storytelling albums", alongside The Kinks and The Pet Shop Boys. In April 2024, Uncut Magazine placed the album in the 222nd spot while listing the "500 Greatest Albums Of The 1990's".
