= Lawrence (musician) =

English singer, songwriter and guitarist

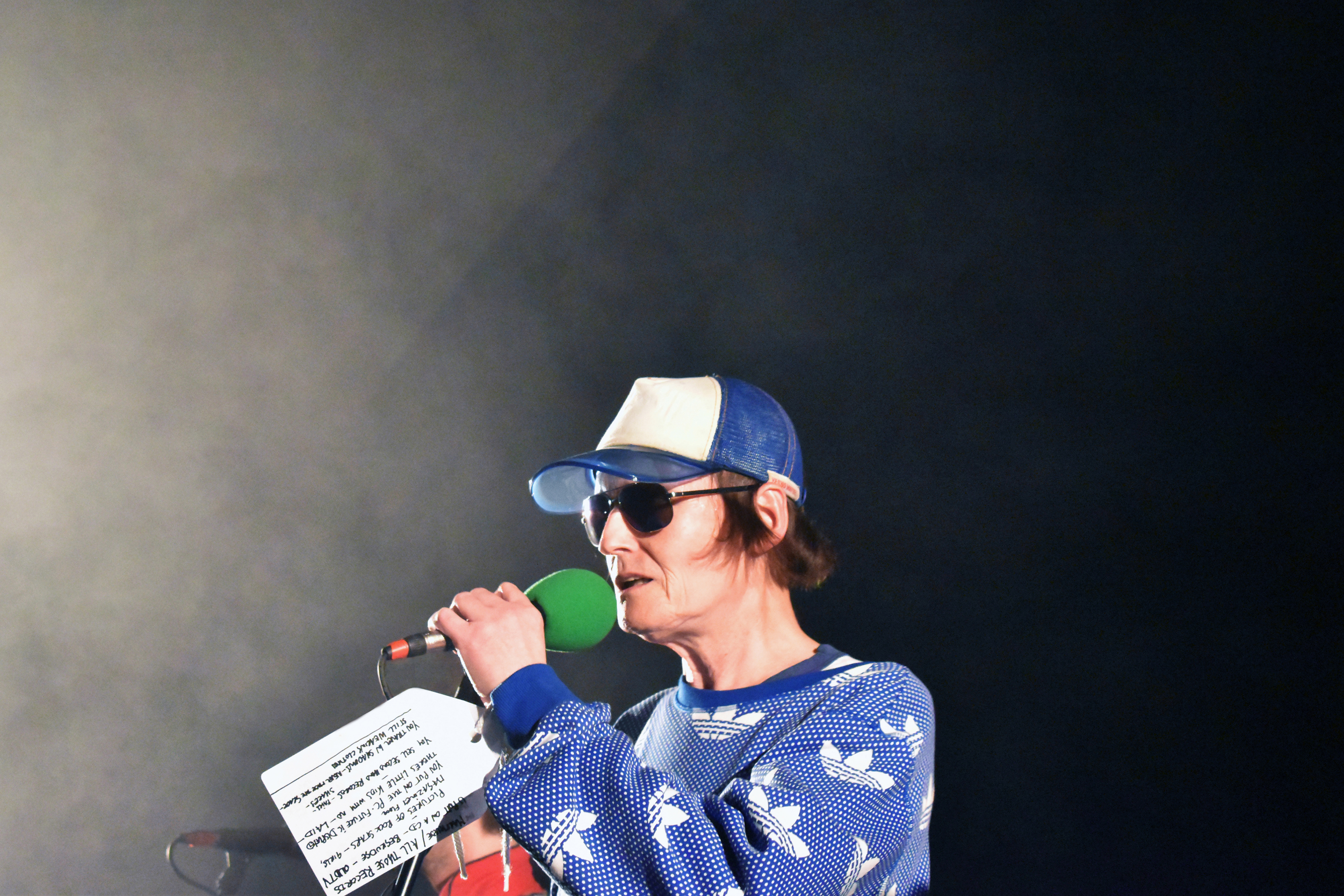
- Lawrence (with Mozart Estate) in concert at the Paris Popfest at the Le Hasard Ludique in Paris in 2022

Background information
- Born: Lawrence Hayward; Birmingham, Warwickshire, England
- Genres: Indie pop; jangle pop; post-punk; glam rock; synthpop
- Occupations: Musician, singer-songwriter
- Instruments: Vocals, guitar, bass, keyboards
- Years active: 1979–present
- Labels: Cherry Red, Creation, Boy's Own, Echo, West Midlands Records

Lawrence (born Lawrence Hayward) is an English singer, songwriter and guitarist. He is known as the frontman in the English indie pop bands Felt, Denim, and Mozart Estate (formerly Go-Kart Mozart).

== Music career ==
=== Felt ===
Felt released ten albums in the 1980s, and Lawrence was the only constant member of the band from its inception in 1979 to its dissolution in 1989. He does not appear on the band's penultimate album, Train Above The City, despite being present at the recording sessions. During his time in the band, he served as lyricist and co-songwriter, together with then-lead guitarist Maurice Deebank, who left the band in 1985.

=== Denim ===
After the dissolution of Felt, Lawrence formed Denim. Influenced lyrically by Lawrence's upbringing during the 1970s and stylistically by bubblegum and glam rock, Denim released two albums in the 1990s, plus a compilation of B-sides and extra tracks, but mainstream success continued to elude Lawrence. A third album (sometimes referred to as Denim Take Over) was shelved indefinitely, and a standalone single "Summer Smash" was withdrawn shortly after the death of Princess Diana. Lawrence co-wrote the first single by Shampoo, "Blisters and Bruises", released in 1993.

=== Go-Kart Mozart and Mozart Estate ===
1999 saw the full-length debut of Lawrence's current project, Go-Kart Mozart, released through his personal imprint, West Midlands Records and distributed by Cherry Red. The 2005 follow-up was titled Tearing Up The Album Chart – a wry comment on his failure to achieve commercial success, a habit the album itself did nothing to break. UNCUT awarded Lawrence the dubious honour of being "one of the stars fame forgot."

In 2006, Lawrence began working on a new Go-Kart Mozart album entitled On the Hot Dog Streets that was eventually released in June 2012 to coincide with the nationwide premiere of Lawrence of Belgravia, which documented the making of the record.

Lawrence has also frequently collaborated with his friend, actress Eva Yelmani. In 2025, Yelmani starred in the music videos for Mozart Estate's "Summer Is Here" and "Electric Rock 'n' Roll", both directed by Douglas Hart, from the album Tower Block in a Jam Jar.

== Documentary and book ==
Filmmaker Paul Kelly directed a documentary about Lawrence, titled Lawrence of Belgravia (a reference both to the Welshman who led the Arab Revolt and the district of Central London in which Lawrence once resided), which was set to premiere at the London Film Festival in 2006, but wasn't ready at the time. A 20-minute work-in-progress version of the documentary was screened at the Barbican Centre in London in November 2008. A final finished cut of the film had its debut screening at the 2011 London Film festival, followed by screenings in several film and music festivals.

In 2024 it was announced that a book about Lawrence, titled Street Level Superstar: A Year With Lawrence, was being published by Nine Eight books. Written by the UK journalist Will Hodgkinson, the book recounts a year in the life of Lawrence - following on from Hodgkinson's earlier full-length cover feature and interview with Lawrence in the Idler magazine.

== Personal life ==
Due to his reclusive public persona, Lawrence has given very little information away about his personal life, aside from the fact that he was born at 12 Melville Road in Edgbaston, Birmingham, as referred to in the Felt song "Mobile Shack", though moved as a child to the nearby village of Water Orton, Warwickshire, where he met founding Felt members Maurice Deebank and Nick Gilbert. Early on he was heavily influenced by Tom Verlaine of Television in both his guitar-playing and his idiosyncratic vocals.

After being evicted from his Belgravia flat in 2005, Lawrence went through a period of homelessness and hostel living, as featured in Lawrence of Belgravia. He currently lives in a tower block close to the Old Street Roundabout in Hackney, London.

In 2018, Lawrence was awarded Maverick of the Year at the Q Awards. In 2024, a Portuguese pink marble bust of Lawrence, sculpted by artist Corin Johnson, was exhibited at the Fitzrovia Chapel in London.

== Discography ==
=== with Felt ===
- Crumbling the Antiseptic Beauty (1982)
- The Splendour of Fear (1984)
- The Strange Idols Pattern and Other Short Stories (1984)
- Ignite the Seven Cannons (1985)
- Let the Snakes Crinkle Their Heads to Death (1986)
- Forever Breathes the Lonely Word (1986)
- Poem of the River (1987)
- Gold Mine Trash (1987)
- The Pictorial Jackson Review (1988)
- Train Above the City (1988)
- Space Blues (1988)
- Me and a Monkey on the Moon (1989)
- Bubblegum Perfume (1990)
- Absolute Classic Masterpieces (1992)
- Absolute Classic Masterpieces Volume II (1993)
- Stains on a Decade (2003)

=== with Denim ===
- Back in Denim (1992)
- Denim on Ice (1996)
- Novelty Rock (1997)

=== with Go-Kart Mozart ===
- Instant Wigwam and Igloo Mixture (1999)
- Tearing Up the Album Chart (2005)
- On the Hot Dog Streets (2012)
- Mozart's Mini-Mart (2018)

=== with Mozart Estate ===
- Pop-Up! Ker-Ching! and the Possibilities of Modern Shopping (2023)
- .Tower Block in a Jam Jar(2025)
