= The Fallen Leaves =

British garage rock group

- Origin: London, England, United Kingdom
- Genres: R&B, rock & roll, blues, rock, garage rock, garage punk, beat music, freakbeat, psychedelic rock
- Years active: 2004–present
- Label: Parliament
- Members: Rob Green; Rob Symmons; Ian O'Sullivan
- Past members: Paul Myers; Paul Cook; James Bradley; Phil King; Daniel Strittmatter; Paul Messis; Ian O'Sullivan; William Lewington; Matthew Karas; Gareth "Mountbatten" Evans; Brett "Buddy" Ascott
- Website: www.thefallenleaves.net

The Fallen Leaves are a British garage rock group that formed in Richmond, London in 2004. The group was formed by Rob Symmons (dustbin guitar) and Rob Green (vocals) with Paul Myers (bass). The current line-up features drummer Ian O'Sullivan, formerly of The Aardvarks.

== Prehistory ==
Symmons and Myers, along with Vic Goddard, were founding members of Subway Sect who were managed by Bernie Rhodes. One of the UK's first punk groups, Subway Sect toured extensively with The Clash, recorded two Peel sessions and released two singles before disbanding in mysterious circumstances. Their second single. 'Ambition' was culled from an album that was almost finished but never released and subsequently lost. Myers went on to play bass with Steve Jones and Paul Cook in the Professionals. Symmons, unable to retrieve his guitar from the band lockup, gave up professional music for over twenty years until persuaded out of retirement by old friend, Rob Green. Green had built a reputation singing at Bernie Rhodes' "Club Left" and by performing with Vic Godard's later version of the Subway Sect, once supporting Siouxsie and the Banshees at the Music Machine in 1980.

== Formation of the band and changing line-ups ==
Green and Symmons had been writing songs together on various occasions and in 2004, spurred on by a shared love of 60's garage rock, dressing up for a show, and Green's long-held belief that a good idea trumps a bad song, got into action.

The Leaves made their debut at the Stripes Bar at Brentford Football Club on 9 July 2004 – opening for Vic Godard & The Subway Sect. Symmons' Subways colleague, Paul Myers played bass and with "King" James Bradley on drums the group played a five-song set – High And Dry/Trouble/Back To You/Repetition/Revenge. They subsequently appeared at the Monk Club in Richmond over the course of the next few months. In August the band ventured out of London to support The 5.6.7.8's in Nottingham.

Pete Townshend offered the band some free studio time at his Eel Pie Studios, near Richmond. The band, with a session drummer, quickly recorded the three tracks that would become the "Trouble" E.P.

Paul Myers left the Fallen Leaves in 2005 as the band was starting to play gigs outside London, which was encroaching on his work as an addictions counsellor

== 2006-present ==
In 2006, the "Trouble" EP was released as a four-track CD and a 7-inch single on the band's own Parliament Records.

Swiss eccentric Daniel Strittmatter, former drummer for Mike Scott, Ian McNabb, The High Llamas and Koala, began drumming for the band around this time. This line-up of the band recorded seven tracks in a session at Gizzard Studio in Bow.

Phil King left the band and was replaced by Paul Messis. Messis played with the group up until March 2007 when he left to go travelling. It was this line-up that completed the Fallen Leaves debut album, It's Too Late Now, at Bark Studios, working with producer Brian O'Shaughnessy.

By September 2007, the increasing workload of Strittmatter's other projects, including ex-Adam and The Ants sidemen, The Wolfmen, led to his departure from the group to be replaced by Ian O' Sullivan, formerly of psych pop garage band, The Aardvarks. In February 2008, the Leaves recorded three tracks in the 6Music Hub for Tom Robinson.

In the spring of 2008, The Fallen Leaves released It's Too Late Now on their own Parliament Records. The album was listed as an early album of the year by the Sunday Times, with a 4/5 star review

The Fallen Leaves have continued to play shows in the UK, and in September 2008 crossed the Atlantic to play two shows in New York State and record another radio session, this time 14 songs at WFMU for the Evan "The Funk" Davies show, including four songs from their next album.

Ian O'Sullivan left the group in 2012, to be replaced by Bill Lewington.

On Bill Lewington's departure from the band towards the end of 2015, The Fallen Leaves were joined by former Chords drummer Brett "Buddy" Ascott, who remained behind the kit until his final appearance at the Fighting Cocks, Kingston on 11 Nov 2023. This was also to be the last live appearance with the band of bassist Gareth "Mountbatten" Evans (2007-2009 & 2021-2023). In between Gareth's stints on bass Matthew Karas (Glassglue, Soil (British band)) played bass guitar (and on "Passing By", harmonica) for the band (2009-2021).

2023 - Ian O'Sullivan rejoins the Leaves.

== The Parliament Club ==
On 26 November 2004, The Fallen Leaves began hosting the Parliament Club at The Blackhorse, Richmond. The headliners for the first Parliament Club were the reformed Downliners Sect. Each Parliament Club evening features The Fallen Leaves, who have been joined by the likes of Billy Childish and the Buff Medways, The Masonics, John's Children, A Nation Mourns and Eater, to name a few. On 21 November 2006 The Parliament Club relocated to the Inn On The Green, Ladbroke Grove and ran until 2011, when the venue closed down. From then until January 2015, the group had a monthly residency at the 12 Bar Club in Denmark Street.

== Discography ==
=== Singles ===
Trouble
Label: Parliament Records – PAR001
Released: 2006
Format: Vinyl, 7", 45 RPM, Mono

- Side A: Trouble (Part 1)
- Side B: Trouble (Part 2)

Out In A Forest
Label: Market Square Records – MSR—12
Released: 27 Oct 2015
Format: Vinyl, 7", 45 RPM, Limited Edition

- Side A: Out In A Forest
- Side B: The Inside of a Chair

Green Eyes F.C.
Label: Parliament Records – PARL10
Released: 25 May 2019
Format: Vinyl, 7", 45 RPM, Limited Edition

- Side A: Green Eyes F.C.
- Side B: Motor Cycle Girl

Begin Again
Label: Parliament Records – PARL11
Released: 25 May 2019
Format: Vinyl, 7", 45 RPM, Limited Edition

- Side A: Begin Again
- Side B: So Much More

=== EP ===
Trouble EP
Label: Parliament Records – PAR002
Released: 2006
Format: CD, EP, Mono
Track list:

- Trouble (edit)
- Revenge Is Sweet
- High and Dry
- Trouble (full length)

=== Albums ===
It's Too Late Now
Label: Parliament Records – PAR003
Released: 4 Jul 2008
Format: CD, album
Track list:

- All That You Choose
- Happy Times
- Wednesdays With You
- Go Now
- Seven Years
- Days of Summer
- Back To You
- Repetition
- Higher And Dryer
- Shining

Recorded at Bark Studios and Produced by The Fallen Leaves and Brian O’Shaughnessy.

That's Right
Label: Parliament Records – PAR004
Released: 30 Nov 2009
Format: CD, album
Track list:

- Did You See Her
- My Phantoms
- Sylvie Says
- Is She Somewhere
- Miss Demeanour
- The International Brigade
- Charity Girl
- Vendetta
- Listen to My Heart
- When You're Gone

Recorded at Bark Studios and Produced by The Fallen Leaves and Brian O’Shaughnessy.

If Only We'd Known
Label: Parliament Records – PAR005
Released: 1 Apr 2013
Format: CD, album
Track list:

- Against The Grain
- Always More
- Ancient & Modern
- Girl in a Trance
- Glorious Vain
- Maybe That's It
- I Can Make Your Hair Grow
- Passing By
- I Made A Mistake
- War Memorial

Recorded at Bark Studios and Produced by The Fallen Leaves and Brian O’Shaughnessy.

What We've All Been Waiting For
Label: Parliament Records – PAR007
Released: 3 Apr 2017
Format: CD, album
Track list:

- Prodigal Son
- I'm A Man
- Lavender Girl
- Funny World
- Taking A View
- All That Glitters
- Promised Land
- Out In A Forest
- Motorcycle Girl
- Good Man

Recorded at Bark Studios and Produced by The Fallen Leaves and Brian O’Shaughnessy.

=== Compilation Albums ===
Punk Rock For Gentlemen
Label: Parliament Records – PARL006
Format: Vinyl, LP, Compilation
Released: 16 July 2016
Format: CD, Compilation
Released: 14 December 2018

Track list:

- Go Now
- Did You See Here
- Passing By
- Is She Somewhere
- Girls In A Trance
- Shining
- Sylvie Says
- Always More
- The International Brigade
- High & Dry
- Against The Grain
- Trouble

=== Live Albums ===
Maximum Minimum
Label: Parliament Records – PARL009
Released: 29 Sept 2019
Format: Vinyl, LP, Limited Edition
Track list:

- Prodigal Son
- Passing By
- Is She somewhere
- I made A Mistake
- Green Eyes
- Shining
- Against The Grain
- Lavender Girl
- Sylvie Says
- Out In A Forest
- Phantoms
- Trouble

The Fallen Leaves live at the legendary Hope & Anchor, Islington. Recorded By Pat Collier, Engineered by Charles Wong
