= Train Above the City =

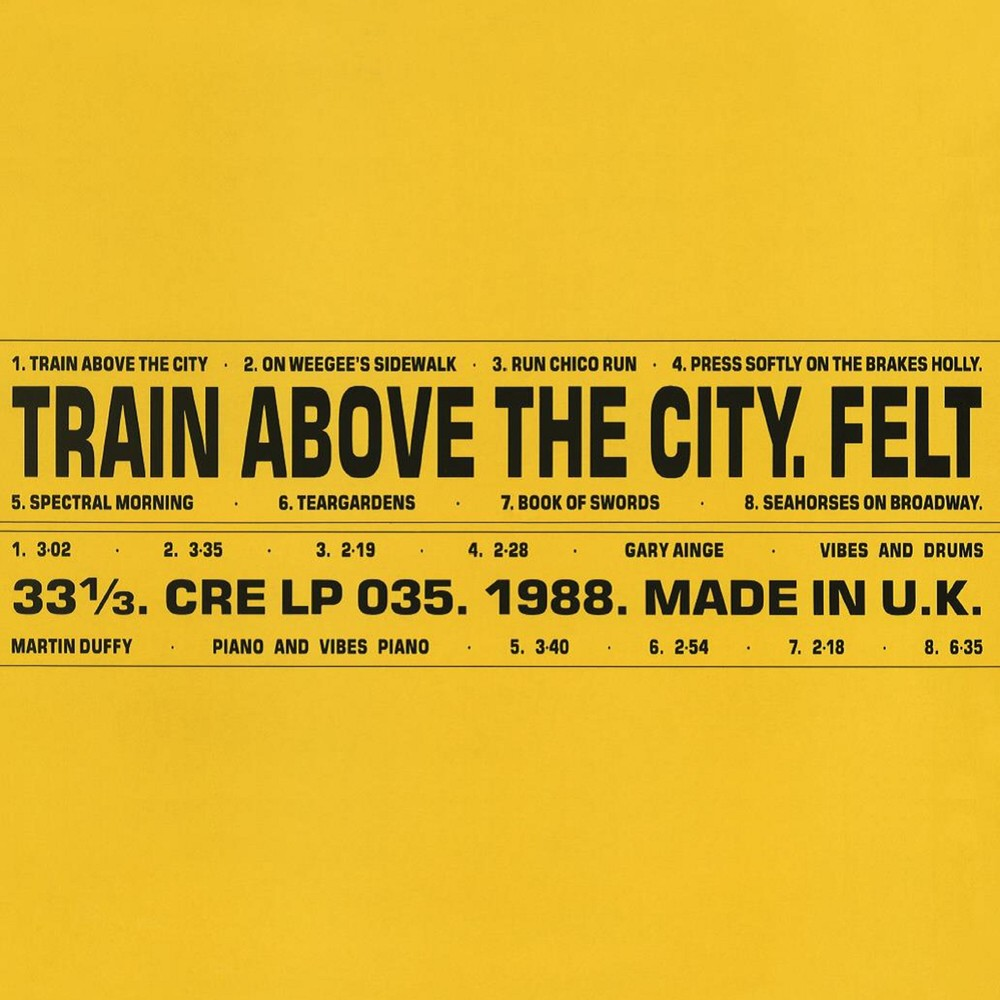

Studio album by Felt
- Released: July 1988
- Length: 27:25
- Label: Creation
- Producer: Joseph James Foster

Felt chronology
The Pictorial Jackson Review (1988)	Train Above the City (1988)	Me and a Monkey on the Moon (1989)

Train Above the City is the ninth and penultimate album by English alternative rock band Felt, released in 1988.

The album does not feature frontman Lawrence in any musical capacity, apart from directing the sessions and providing the track titles (except for "Run Chico Run", which is credited to Wenzel Brown). The music, all instrumental and in a jazz style, was written and performed by keyboardist Martin Duffy and drummer/percussionist Gary Ainge.

== Critical reception ==
Professional ratings
Review scores
Source	Rating
AllMusic	3/5 stars
Sounds	2/5 stars

Reviewing the album for Melody Maker, Simon Turner said it "bears no obvious relationship to anything else they've done."

== Track listing ==
All songs written by Martin Duffy and Gary Ainge.

No.	Title	Length
1.	"Train Above the City"	3:07
2.	"On Weegee's Sidewalk"	3:41
3.	"Run Chico Run"	2:23
4.	"Press Softly on the Brakes Holly"	2:32
5.	"Spectral Morning"	3:45
6.	"Teargardens"	2:57
7.	"Book of Swords"	2:22
8.	"Seahorses on Broadway"	6:38

== Personnel ==
- Martin Duffy – vibes and vibes piano
- Gary Ainge – vibes and drums
