= The Strange Idols Pattern and Other Short Stories =

Studio album by Felt
- Released: 26 October 1984
- Recorded: 1984
- Genres: Indie pop, jangle pop, post-punk
- Length: 27:53
- Label: Cherry Red
- Producer: John Leckie

Felt chronology
The Splendour of Fear (1984)	The Strange Idols Pattern and Other Short Stories (1984)	Ignite the Seven Cannons (1985)

Singles from The Strange Idols Pattern and Other Short Stories
- 1. "Sunlight Bathed the Golden Glow" Released: July 1984

Reissue
- 2003 Reissue Cover

Professional ratings
Review scores
Source	Rating
AllMusic	5/5 stars
Q	4/5 stars
Record Collector	5/5 stars

The Strange Idols Pattern and Other Short Stories is the third album by English alternative rock band Felt, released in 1984 and produced by John Leckie. The album marked a departure from the introspective, guitar-led sound of their first two albums, with Lawrence's vocals becoming much more dominant in the mix along with a greater emphasis on pop melodies. The album also introduced a traditional drum kit to the band's sound, having previously relied on tom drums in the past.

Tracks 2, 4 and 7 are instrumental. "Sunlight Bathed the Golden Glow" is different from the single version. "Whirlpool Vision of Shame" is a re-recording of earlier single "My Face is on Fire", with new lyrics.

== Track listing ==
All songs written by Lawrence and Maurice Deebank. "Crucifix Heaven" was omitted from some reissues of the album.

No.	Title	Length
1.	"Roman Litter"	3:31
2.	"Sempiternal Darkness"	2:15
3.	"Spanish House"	4:31
4.	"Imprint"	1:46
5.	"Sunlight Bathed the Golden Glow"	2:57
6.	"Vasco Da Gama"	3:41
7.	"Crucifix Heaven"	3:40
8.	"Dismantled King Is off the Throne"	2:51
9.	"Crystal Ball"	2:57
10.	"Whirlpool Vision of Shame"	3:31
Total length:		27:53

== Personnel ==
Felt

- Lawrence – vocals, rhythm guitar
- Maurice Deebank – lead guitar
- Mick Lloyd – bass guitar
- Gary Ainge – drums

Production

- John Leckie – production
