= Pakistan Information Commission =

- Abbreviation: PIC
- Formation: November 7, 2018
- Type: Independent and autonomous enforcement body
- Legal status: Active
- Purpose: To establish mechanisms that enable citizens of Pakistan to exercise their constitutional right of access to information in matters of public importance
- Location: Pakistan
- Region served: Pakistan
- Chief Information Commissioner: Shoaib Ahmad Siddiqui
- Website: rti.gov.pk

The Pakistan Information Commission (PIC) operates as an independent and self-governing entity, established in accordance with Section 18 of the Right of Access to Information Act 2017. Its primary function is to create systems and processes that enable the citizens of Pakistan to exercise their constitutional entitlement to access information concerning matters of public significance.

The PIC holds the responsibility of enforcing the Right of Access to Information Act 2017. This involves various activities such as promoting public awareness of the law, assisting federal public bodies in adhering to the law, conducting training for public information officers, monitoring their performance, addressing complaints, and initiating appropriate action against individuals or entities that do not comply with the provisions outlined in the Right of Access to Information Act 2017.

== Establishment and structure ==
The PIC was officially established on November 7, 2018. Its structure comprises a Chief Information Commissioner and two Information Commissioners. As of June 8, 2023, the serving Information Commissioners are Shoaib Ahmad Siddiqui, Ijaz Hassan Awan, and Huzaifa Rehman.

== Achievements and initiatives ==
Within the four years since its inception, the PIC received a cumulative total of 2,474 appeals. Of these, 2,153 appeals were submitted via postal services, and 321 appeals were received through email via the Information Management System. As of April 7, 2023, the PIC had resolved and closed 1,300 appeals, which was part of the overall 2,900 appeals received. However, there were still 1,600 appeals that remained pending for resolution.

Despite progress, the PIC grapples with challenges in implementing commission orders and the Right to Information law. These include limited resources, funding shortages, and challenges in enforcing the commission's directives.

=== Partnerships and collaborations ===
The PIC collaborated with different groups to improve access to information. In September 2023, they, along with UNESCO and the Peace and Justice Network, organized a conference in Islamabad to discuss the difficulties that marginalized communities encounter when trying to access information on the internet.

In collaboration with the Press Network of Pakistan, a media house registered with Ministry of Information & Broadcasting, Government of Pakistan, a nationwide Pakistan RTI Quiz Contest 2024 was announced to raise public awareness regarding the Right of Access to Information Act, 2017, in order to promote the culture of accountability, transparency and good governance among federal public bodies. The date for announcing the winners has been selected on the occasion of International Day for Universal Access to Information 2024.
