= Poem of the River =

Studio album by Felt
- Released: 22 June 1987
- Genres: Indie pop, jangle pop, folk rock
- Length: 26:01
- Label: Creation
- Producer: Mayo Thompson

Felt chronology
Forever Breathes the Lonely Word (1986)	Poem of the River (1987)	Gold Mine Trash (1987)

Professional ratings
Review scores
Source	Rating
AllMusic	4/5 stars
Sounds	4/5 stars

Poem of the River is the seventh album by English alternative rock band Felt, released in 1987.

== Track listing ==
All songs written by Lawrence.

No.	Title	Length
1.	"Declaration"	1:47
2.	"Silver Plane"	2:38
3.	"She Lives by the Castle"	6:18
4.	"Stained Glass Windows in the Sky"	2:06
5.	"Riding on the Equator"	8:54
6.	"Dark Red Birds"	4:18

== Personnel ==
Felt

- Lawrence – vocals, electric guitar (track 5)
- Martin Duffy – Hammond organ
- Marco Thomas – bass guitar, electric guitar (track 2)
- Gary Ainge – drums

Additional personnel

- Tony Willé – electric guitar (tracks 3–5), acoustic guitar (track 6)
- Neil Scott – electric guitar (tracks 3–6)
- Mayo Thompson – production
