= Soil (British band) =

English indie pop band

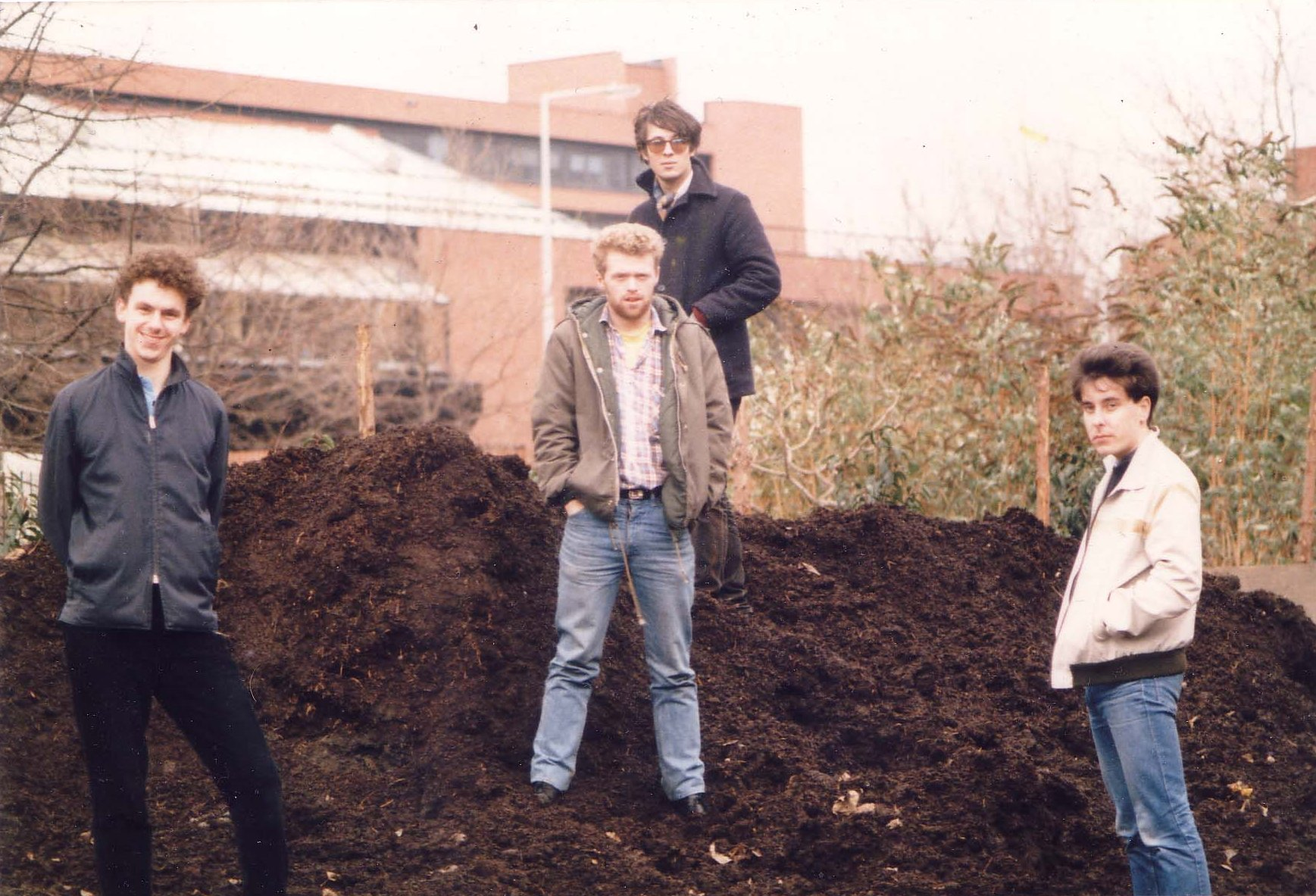
- Soil in 1986

Background information
- Origin: Manchester, England
- Genre: Indie pop
- Years active: 1984–1987
- Past members: Matthew Karas; Kevin Siddall; Lee Bennett; Gary Farrell; Rob Kerford; Phil Morris; Ged O'Brien

Soil were a British indie pop group, formed in Manchester, England in 1984, by North Manchester school-friends, Kevin Siddall (songwriter, guitar), Lee Bennett (bass guitar) and Rob Kerford (drums), and University of Manchester student, Matthew Karas (songwriter, vocals, keyboards, harmonica). Kerford left the group, just before the first gig, and Matthew's neighbour, Ravi Low-Beer, stood in on drums.

Low-Beer, Kerford and guitarist, Siddall, all played drums on the four song cassette, Too Ill to Close the Door, which was duplicated and distributed by the group, and reviewed in City Life and the Manchester Evening News. After auditioning a few drummers, Gary Farrell, from Stretford, joined the group.

In this line-up, Soil supported The Smiths in Kilburn, on 23 October 1986, at Morrissey's invitation. This was the concert at which The Smiths' live album, Rank, was recorded. Karas had given Morrissey a cassette during a chance encounter, and received a postcard shortly afterwards.

In the same year, Soil played at venues around Manchester, and regularly appeared at The Boardwalk. They also supported Easterhouse on a short UK tour.

Their only release was a flexi-single on the cover of Debris fanzine, edited by Dave Haslam. The track, "Front Room". was played on BBC Radio 1 by John Peel several times, as well as on the local radio stations, BBC Radio Manchester and Red Rose Radio. Karas and Siddall recorded three jingles for the BBC Radio Manchester show, Meltdown, which were played weekly for several months.

Soon after the Smiths concert, both Farrell and Bennett left the group. Karas and Siddall played one concert with a backing tape, before recruiting bass guitarist, Phil Morris, and drummer, Ged O'Brien, who played at their final performance at The Boardwalk in 1987.

Karas and Siddall have written and recorded sporadically since 1987, but have not formally released anything or performed in public. The earliest such recording, Profoundly Unhappy Again, somehow got into the hands of Radio Manchester broadcaster, John Piper, who played it on BBC Radio 1, in a slot covering the Manchester music scene on Janice Long's evening show in 1987.

After 1987, they played short sets in 2013 and 2023, at Karas' 50th and 60th birthday parties.

Karas played bass guitar and harmonica with The Fallen Leaves from 2009 until 2021, and has been playing various instruments, writing and arranging with Glassglue since 2003.

== Discography ==
=== Cassette EP ===
- Too Ill to Close the Door (1985)

=== Singles ===
- "Front Room" (1986), Debris
