= Mozart Estate =

English indie pop band

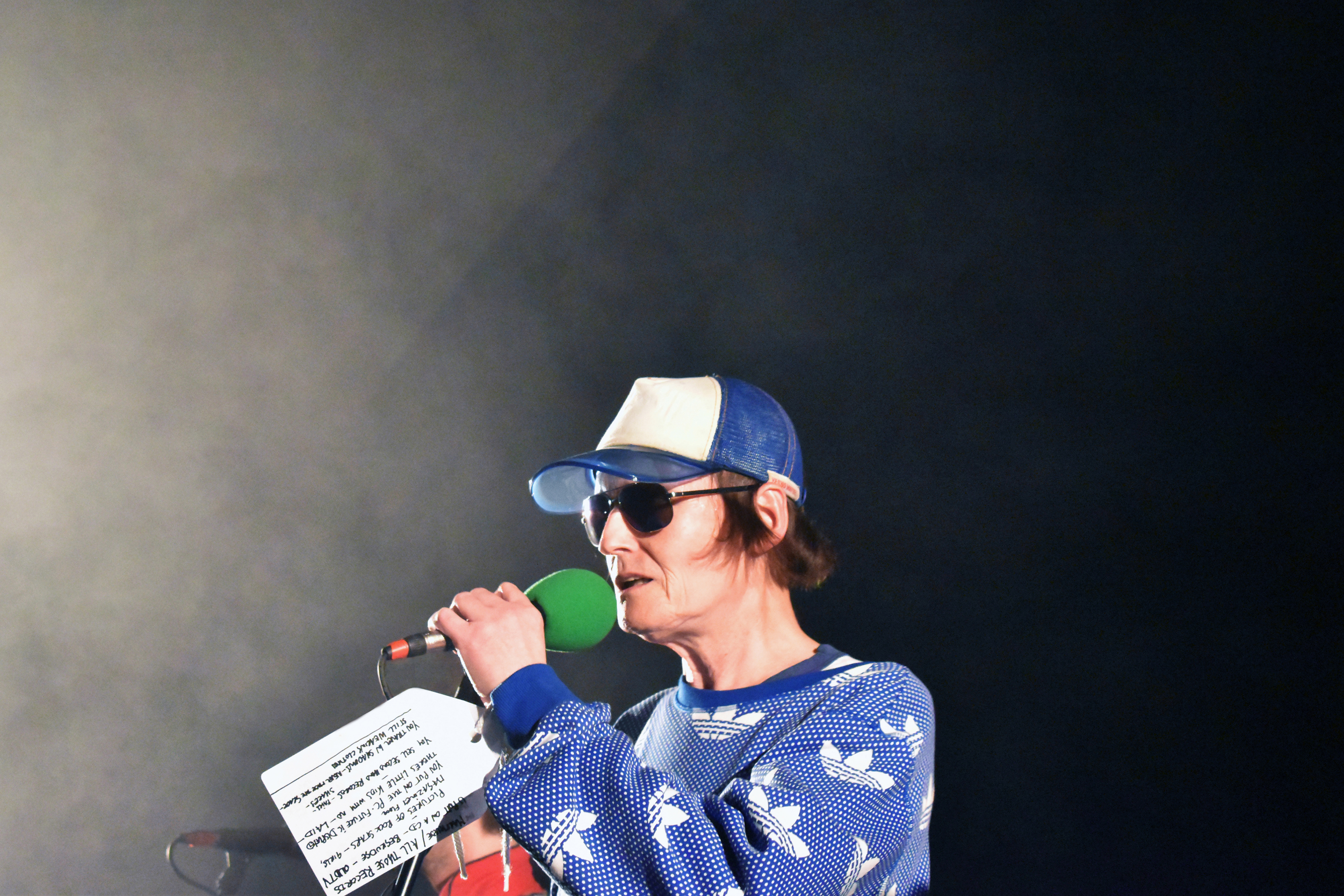
- Lawrence (Mozart Estate) in concert at the Paris Popfest at the Le Hasard Ludique in Paris in 2022

Background information
- Also known as: Go-Kart Mozart
- Origin: London, England
- Genres: Glam rock, indie rock, synthpop, novelty rock
- Years active: 1999–present
- Labels: West Midlands; Cherry Red
- Members: Lawrence; Rusty Stone; Xav Clarke; Charlie Hannah; Dan Lyons
- Past members: Tom Pitts; Terry Miles; Ralph Phillips; Tony Barber; Johnny Male; Gary Ainge; Dave Caplin; Patrick Hagen

Mozart Estate, formerly known as Go-Kart Mozart, are an English indie pop band founded by Lawrence, previously of the bands Felt and Denim. Lawrence formed the group as a reaction to his previous bands' lack of commercial success. He has called it "the world's first B-side band," which he explains "simply meant that you would take away the pressure of I've got to write a hit single, I've got to write an album that's going to get in the top ten." The band's original name is derived from a line in the song "Blinded by the Light" by Bruce Springsteen.

== History ==
In 1999, the first Go-Kart Mozart album, Instant Wigwam and Igloo Mixture, was released. Lawrence had intended the album to be a side project whilst his previous group Denim was on hiatus and he was making negotiations for a deal with Alan McGee, who had previously signed Felt to his Creation Records label back in the 1980s. However, the deal with McGee fell through when Creation disbanded, and it was issued on West Midlands Records, a subsidiary of Cherry Red created for Lawrence's post-Felt releases. A second Go-Kart Mozart album, Tearing Up the Album Chart, followed in 2005 and was again released on West Midlands.

Released specially on Record Store Day in April 2012, "New World in the Morning", a cover of the Roger Whittaker song, was a standalone single and was also featured in the film Lawrence of Belgravia. This was followed by the album On the Hot Dog Streets, which was released in June 2012. The album contained songs from the unreleased Denim album, 'Denim Take Over', as well as several new compositions.

A recording called Mozart's Mini-Mart was intended to follow On the Hot Dog Streets, initially as an accompanying mini-album. At the end of 2013, Cherry Red announced intentions for this to appear as a 2014 album. In November 2017, Cherry Red announced a new release date of 23 February 2018, alongside a new music video for "When You're Depressed".

In February 2018, Lawrence stated that Go-Kart Mozart would change their name to Mozart Estate, beginning with an album entitled Pop-Up! Ker-Ching! and the Possibilities of Modern Shopping. He explained that the name Go-Kart Mozart "doesn't ring true anymore. It doesn't sit right in these times." Lawrence also confirmed plans to release a re-recorded version of Tearing Up the Album Chart, entitled Renovating the Album Chart. The name change came into effect with the release of the video-only single "Record Store Day" in 2021. In 2022, Lawrence began performing as Mozart Estate with a brand new lineup, featuring Xav Clarke on guitar, Charle Hannah on keyboards, Tom Pitts on drums and with only bassist Rusty Stone retained from Go-Kart Mozart. Hannah and Clarke are both members of Margate-based band Itchy Teeth. Pitts not currently part of the live band.

Pop-Up! Ker-ching! and the Possibilities of Modern Shopping was released on 27 January 2023. Tower Block in a Jam Jar, composed of re-recordings of songs from Tearing Up the Album Chart, is set to be released on 17 October 2025.

Lawrence has also frequently collaborated with his friend, actress Eva Yelmani. In 2025, Yelmani starred in the music videos for Mozart Estate's "Summer Is Here" and "Electric Rock 'n' Roll", both directed by Douglas Hart, from the album Tower Block in a Jam Jar.

== Discography ==
=== Studio albums ===
as Go-Kart Mozart:

- Instant Wigwam and Igloo Mixture (2000)
- Tearing Up the Album Chart (2005)
- On the Hot Dog Streets (2012)
- Mozart's Mini-Mart (2018)

as Mozart Estate:

- Pop-Up! Ker-Ching! and the Possibilities of Modern Shopping (2023)
- Tower Block in a Jam Jar (2025)

=== Singles ===
as Go-Kart Mozart:

- "We're Selfish and Lazy and Greedy" (1999)
- "New World in the Morning" (2012)
- "When You're Depressed" (2017)

as Mozart Estate:

- "Record Store Day" (2021)
- "Relative Poverty" (2022)
- "Vanilla Gorilla" (2023)
