= The Seventeenth Century (album) =

Studio album by Felt
- Released: June 1986
- Genre: Indie pop
- Length: 19:00
- Label: Creation
- Producer: Felt

Felt chronology
Ignite the Seven Cannons (1985)	The Seventeenth Century (1986)	Forever Breathes the Lonely Word (1986)

Reissue
- 2003/2018 Reissue Cover

Professional ratings
Review scores
Source	Rating
AllMusic	4/5 stars
Record Collector	3/5 stars

The Seventeenth Century (originally titled Let the Snakes Crinkle Their Heads to Death) is the fifth album by English alternative rock band Felt, released in 1986.

Their first album for Creation Records, it is composed of short instrumentals in different styles and is less than nineteen minutes in length. The original album cover featured a photo of the band which was replaced on reissues by a cropped version.

For the 2018 reissue of the album, Felt singer, guitarist and songwriter Lawrence returned the record to its original planned title, renaming it The Seventeenth Century. The CD reissue also featured a different cover, replacing previously used photographs with typography.

== Track listing ==
All songs written by Lawrence.

No.	Title	Length
1.	"Song for William S. Harvey"	2:44
2.	"Ancient City Where I Lived"	1:31
3.	"The Seventeenth Century"	2:11
4.	"The Palace"	1:52
5.	"Indian Scriptures"	1:35
6.	"The Nazca Plain"	1:27
7.	"Jewel Sky"	1:01
8.	"Viking Dress"	2:50
9.	"Voyage to Illumination"	1:21
10.	"Sapphire Mansions"	2:27

== Personnel ==
- Lawrence – guitar
- Martin Duffy – Hammond organ, electric piano
- Marco Thomas – bass
- Gary Ainge – drums, bongos
