= Forever Breathes the Lonely Word =

Studio album by Felt
- Released: September 1986
- Recorded: Woodbine Street Recording Studios, Leamington Spa
- Genres: Jangle pop, indie pop, folk rock
- Length: 31:45
- Label: Creation
- Producer: John A. Rivers

Felt chronology
The Seventeenth Century (1986)	Forever Breathes the Lonely Word (1986)	Poem of the River (1987)

Singles from Forever Breathes the Lonely Word
- 1. "Rain of Crystal Spires" Released: September 1986

Professional ratings
Review scores
Source	Rating
AllMusic	4.5/5 stars
Pitchfork	9.3/10
Record Mirror	5/5
Uncut	9/10

Forever Breathes the Lonely Word is the sixth album by English alternative rock band Felt, released in September 1986. This is the first Felt album with no instrumental tracks. The cover photo subject is keyboardist Martin Duffy.

The record features Duffy's organ alongside two guitars, one sometimes played by Lawrence. The organ is foregrounded in the mix and creates a vastly new sound for the band.

In a 2011 NME feature, Hamish MacBain said of the album that "Lawrence delivered his masterpiece," and described it as "the first truly classic Creation album."

== Track listing ==
All songs written by Lawrence.

No.	Title	Length
1.	"Rain of Crystal Spires"	3:54
2.	"Down But Not Yet Out"	3:37
3.	"September Lady"	3:44
4.	"Grey Streets"	3:46
5.	"All the People I Like Are Those That Are Dead"	5:10
6.	"Gather Up Your Wings and Fly"	3:54
7.	"A Wave Crashed on Rocks"	2:54
8.	"Hours of Darkness Have Changed My Mind"	4:46

== Personnel ==
Felt

- Lawrence – vocals, electric guitar
- Martin Duffy – hammond organ, piano, backing vocals
- Marco Thomas – bass guitar, guitar
- Gary Ainge – drums

Additional personnel

- Tony Willé – acoustic and electric guitars, backing vocals
- Sarah & Yvonne – backing vocals
- John A. Rivers – production, backing vocals
