= Pic (novel) =

1971 novella by Jack Kerouac

- First edition
- Author: Jack Kerouac
- Language: English
- Publisher: Grove Press
- Publication date: 1971
- Publication place: United States
- Media type: Print (Hardback & Paperback)
- Pages: 120 pp

Pic is a novella by Jack Kerouac, first published by Grove Press in 1971.

Pic is the story of a small child, Pictorial Review "Pic" Jackson, from North Carolina. When his grandfather, with whom he lives, dies, his older brother appears and plucks him from the dysfunctional home of his aunt. They journey north to New York City, where Pic bears witness to the economic 'hard times' his brother is experiencing. After losing not one, but two jobs in one day, his brother sends his pregnant girlfriend to live with her sister in San Francisco, as the two boys try to hitch and bum their way across the country.

The book is narrated in the first person by Pic, in a voice that is stereotypical for black American youth of the era of publication.
