= Maurice Deebank =

English guitarist

Maurice Deebank is a classically trained English guitarist. He was the co-founder and lead guitarist of the British indie band Felt from its debut album until 1985, and was responsible for the ornate, atmospheric guitar work found on many of the band's early recordings. During his tenure in Felt he co-wrote most of its material with frontman Lawrence.

== Career ==
Deebank was brought up in Water Orton on the eastern edge of Birmingham, where he attended the local school and knew the other founder members of Felt, without particularly being friends with them. He is considered to be a prodigy, a unique compositional voice and "father of indie guitar". He has also been cited as a major influence by the Smiths' Johnny Marr, as well as many other mainstream and alternative indie acts. Felt had released their first single "Index" in 1979, which had unexpectedly been made Single of the Week by Sounds magazine. Lawrence – who at this stage still couldn't tune a guitar – invited Deebank to join the band shortly afterwards: "one day I got him round and he tuned my guitar in three seconds. I was in shock. Then he played Mr Tambourine Man. I said: 'I don't believe it, you're a genius.' We were only 16 or 17 and I'd never seen anyone play that fast. It still went clunky when I went from one chord to another." Lawrence was later explicit in recognising Deebank's importance to early Felt: "I thought, God, I could really go somewhere with this kid. Ride on his back to the top, that's how I saw it. He was voted into Guitar Player magazine's Top 40 Underrated Guitar Players of all time in 2007; a celebration of the publication's fortieth anniversary.

Deebank's work as a solo artist combined eclecticism with a musical sophistication derived from his classical training. His sole solo album, Inner Thought Zone, was released on Cherry Red Records in 1984, with four additional tracks recorded in 1992 added to the CD issue. The track "Dance of Deliverance" from Inner Thought Zone later appeared on the Felt compilation Absolute Classic Masterpieces. He also co-wrote and performed on the Saint Etienne song "Paper", which first appeared on their "Avenue" single.

Lawrence honoured his former bandmate with his later band Go-Kart Mozart's song "Delta Echo Echo Beta Alpha Neon Kettle", on Tearing Up the Album Chart.

== Personal life ==
Deebank is on the autism spectrum.
