= Denim (band) =

English indie rock band

- Origin: Birmingham, England
- Genres: Glam rock, indie rock
- Years active: 1992–1997
- Labels: Boy's Own; Echo; EMIDISC; West Midlands Records
- Past members: Lawrence; Brian O'Shaughnessy; Neil Scott; Peter Phipps; Bill Bass; Bill Phillips

Denim were an English indie rock band, the brainchild of Lawrence (formerly of Felt), and were based in Birmingham, England.

== History ==
Following the end of his former group, 1980s post-punk outfit Felt, Lawrence moved into different territory with Denim, a band whose brash teaming of glam rock with cutting and highly satirical lyrics was very much the opposite of his previous work.

=== Back in Denim ===
Denim debuted in 1992 with the album Back in Denim, a record which was both a revival (particularly with its glam rock influences and its mix of synth and guitar) and critique (in its satirical lyrics) of the 1970s music scene. A single, "Middle of the Road", was released from the album in January 1993 on Boy's Own Records.

=== Denim on Ice ===
Denim followed Back in Denim with the 1996 release of Denim on Ice, which was preceded by a single "It Fell Off the Back of a Lorry". Denim on Ice featured even more cutting lyrics with comment on the current state of music in England ("The Great Pub Rock Revival", a stinging attack on Britpop) and the realities of England's social malaise ("Glue & Smack" and "Council Houses"), exhibiting an even more synthesizer-based sound than Back in Denim. The album also spearheaded Lawrence's growing interest in novelty music and earned Denim a support slot with Pulp who were fans of Lawrence and his work.

=== Novelty Rock ===
Denim's final release was Novelty Rock, a compilation of B-sides and some new material, which was released early in 1997.

=== Denim Take Over ===
Denim Take Over was to be Denim's third studio album. It was shelved due to a lack of commercial success for the band, and when its lead single "Summer Smash", due to be issued in September 1997, was cancelled due to the death of Princess Diana, with EMI feeling any release would be in poor taste. These events marked an untimely end for Denim. However, some of the albums tracks were released on a subsequent Lawrence project, the 2005 Go Kart Mozart album Tearing Up the Album Chart, as well as a complete reworking for the next album On the Hot Dog Streets.

== In popular culture ==
In January 2018, satirist Charlie Brooker chose the Denim track "The New Potatoes" as one of his eight tracks on Desert Island Discs, and decided that it would be the one track he would keep with him to the island if the tide washed the others away.

== Discography ==
=== Studio albums ===
- Back in Denim (1992), Boy's Own Recordings
- Denim on Ice (1996), Echo
- Denim Take Over (1997) - Unreleased

=== Compilation albums ===
- Novelty Rock (1997), EMIDISC

=== Singles ===
- "Middle of the Road" (1992), Boy's Own Recordings (No. 78, UK Singles Chart)
- "It Fell Off the Back of a Lorry" (1996), Echo. (No. 79, UK Singles Chart)
- "Summer Smash" (1997), EMIDISC
