= Martin Duffy =

English keyboardist (1967–2022)

- Born: Martin Bernard Duffy; 18 May 1967; Birmingham, England
- Died: 18 December 2022 (aged 55) Brighton, England
- Genres: Alternative rock, indie rock
- Occupation: Musician
- Instruments: Keyboards, guitar, drum machine, samples, turntables
- Years active: 1985–2022
- Label: O Genesis

Martin Bernard Duffy (18 May 1967 – 18 December 2022) was an English musician who played keyboards with Felt and Primal Scream.

== Career ==
Duffy was born in Birmingham and grew up in Rednal in the southwest of the city, attending St. Thomas Aquinas Catholic School in King's Norton, and growing up listening to punk rock, as well as two-tone, the Beatles and Led Zeppelin.

Duffy joined the indie rock band Felt as keyboard player in 1985. Felt frontman Lawrence later recalled "I put up notices in Virgin in Birmingham advertising for a guitarist saying 'Do You Want To Be A Rock 'N' Roll Star?' I'd put two up when this guy came up to me and said, 'I know this keyboard player. He's 16. He's just left school."

Duffy played keyboards on Primal Scream's first two albums, and joined the band permanently after Felt disbanded at the end of 1989.

Duffy also played with the Charlatans following the death of founding member Rob Collins, appearing with the group at Knebworth supporting Oasis in 1996 after learning all the group's songs in three weeks and contributing keyboard parts to the band's fifth album Tellin' Stories.

In 1997, Duffy played organ on Dr. John's Anutha Zone album.

In 2004, Duffy was a member of "rock supergroup" the Chavs with Tim Burgess and Carl Barât of the Libertines. He also contributed to recordings by Heidi Berry, Beth Orton, Paul Weller, Shack and the Chemical Brothers, and released a solo album Assorted Promenades in 2014. His soundtrack work included the films The Laughing King (2016) and Wild Rose (2017). In 2017, he teamed up with Steve Mason of the Beta Band to form the group Alien Stadium.

== Personal life and death ==
Duffy died on 18 December 2022, at age 55. The cause of death was given as a brain injury suffered after a fall at home in Brighton.

Primal Scream released a statement that included "We're all so sad ... Martin was the most musically talented of all of us. (He) could play piano to the level where he was feted not just by his peers in British music, but old school master American musicians such as James Luther Dickinson, Roger Hawkins, David Hood (and) producer Tom Dowd". Charlatans singer Burgess said "(he) stepped in to save the Charlatans when we lost Rob – he played with us at Knebworth and was a true friend. He toured with me in my solo band too – he was a pleasure to spend time with".

In June 2023, a statement made by Duffy's son Louie at his father's inquest started to circulate. Louie claimed his dad had died in debt, saying Primal Scream only paid Duffy as if he was a session musician and treated him to 'tough love' over his alcoholism. This included the claim that he had not received money from the band after they sold their back catalogue in 2022. Duffy had played on all 11 albums and had songwriting credits on two of them.
