= Felt (band) =

English rock band

- Origin: Water Orton, Warwickshire, England
- Genres: Jangle pop; indie pop, dream pop; post-punk
- Years active: 1979–1989
- Labels: Cherry Red; Creation; él
- Spinoffs: Feel
- Past members: Lawrence; Tony Race; Gary Ainge; Maurice Deebank; Nick Gilbert; Mick Lloyd; Martin Duffy; Marco Thomas; Phil King; Mick Bund; Tony Willé; Neil Scott; Richard Left; John Mohan

Felt were an English jangle pop band, formed in 1979 in Water Orton, Warwickshire, and led by the mononymous Lawrence. They were active for ten years through the 1980s, releasing ten singles and ten albums, although none reached the UK singles chart or albums chart. The band's name was inspired by Tom Verlaine's emphasis of the word "felt" in the Television song "Venus".

== History ==
=== Formation ===
Lawrence founded the band in 1979 with the release of the single "Index", a self-published solo recording. A noisy effort unlike Felt's subsequent records, it was later awarded single of the week by Dave McCullough in music newspaper Sounds.

With Lawrence initially on vocals and guitar, they formed properly in 1980 with the addition of schoolfriend Nick Gilbert on drums and local guitarist Maurice Deebank. Becoming co-writer with Lawrence, Deebank's jangly, classical-influenced style of playing would provide the band's signature sound in its early years.

The band performed as a trio before deciding that bass guitar was needed. Gilbert switched to bass and drummer Tony Race was added. He was replaced soon after by Gary Ainge who would remain the only constant member besides Lawrence throughout the rest of Felt's existence, as well as the only member to play on all ten of their albums.

=== Signing ===
Felt signed to Cherry Red Records and their first single as a band, "Something Sends Me to Sleep", was released in 1981. Their first album, Crumbling the Antiseptic Beauty, followed the next year. Exhausted by Lawrence's domineering nature during the album's sessions, Gilbert left and was replaced on bass by Mick Lloyd. Deebank would also take a sabbatical, recording a solo instrumental record Inner Thought Zone, before being coaxed by Lawrence to return to work on the band's second album, The Splendour of Fear. This lineup would then remain unchanged through their third album The Strange Idols Pattern and Other Short Stories, which took a more pop-orientated direction than the lengthy, ambient guitar workouts of its predecessors. In 1982, the Felt song "My Face Is on Fire" appeared on the best-selling Pillows & Prayers compilation.

In 1985, for the recording of their fourth album, keyboard player Martin Duffy and bassist Marco Thomas were added. Ignite the Seven Cannons was produced by Robin Guthrie of the Cocteau Twins and featured Elizabeth Fraser on the single "Primitive Painters". The song reached the top of the UK independent singles chart. Deebank departed for good soon after, prompting a shift in Felt's sound with Duffy's keyboards becoming more central. The lead guitar position would subsequently be filled by an ever-changing succession of players.

The band moved to Creation Records in 1986 and released Let the Snakes Crinkle Their Heads to Death, the first of two instrumental albums they would record. Their next album, Forever Breathes the Lonely Word, was a conventional collection of songs that gained the band praise and would become regarded by many as their best, though a full breakthrough continued to elude them. During this time, Thomas became guitarist and was replaced as bassist by Phil King of The Servants.

Poem of the River followed in 1987, which took a much more low-key, intimate approach, at times recalling the sound of Felt's first two albums. After the Poem Of The River tour, King left the band to work on The Apple Boutique. King would later join the band Lush.

In 1988, Felt released The Pictorial Jackson Review, which saw the band become more experimental, with one side devoted to tight, melodic pop songs and the other consisting of two solo piano pieces from Duffy. The second release of that year was the polarising Train Above the City, which saw Lawrence take on more of a directing role in the studio, guiding Duffy and Ainge full through a collection of cool jazz-influenced instrumentals.

=== Break up ===
In 1989, Lawrence declared it had been his intention all along to release ten singles and ten albums in ten years and, having done so, announced the end of Felt. After releasing their last album, Me and a Monkey on the Moon, which embraced a lusher, more multi-layered sound alongside a more personal lyrical bent from Lawrence, and undertaking a short tour, the band split up. Lawrence went on to form Denim and later, Go Kart Mozart and Mozart Estate. Duffy joined Primal Scream. Ainge would later play with Vic Godard. Mick Lloyd died in 2016. Subsequent bass player Mick Bund died in 2017. Martin Duffy died in 2022.

In 2018, Cherry Red reissued all ten Felt albums in collaboration with Lawrence on CD and vinyl, with new mixes of songs plus revised tracklistings and packaging.

=== Reunion ===
In 2026, Ainge, Thomas, and King reunited to form a new group called 'Feel' alongside keyboardist Martin Davies and lead guitarist Andy Wellings. After 37 years since Felt's last show in Birmingham in December 1989, the group played their first live show together at the Glas-Goes Pop annual festival in Glasgow, where they were joined by guest vocalists Stuart Murdoch and Radhika.

== Legacy ==
Lawrence has said that he believes the band could have been more successful. According to Lawrence, "The reason Felt didn't make it is because John Peel didn't like us."

Felt have been cited as an influence by Stuart Murdoch of Belle and Sebastian, Tim Burgess of the Charlatans, Manic Street Preachers, Girls, and the Tyde.

== Members ==
- Lawrence – vocals, guitars (1979–1989)
- Maurice Deebank – guitars (1980–1981, 1983-1985)
- Nick Gilbert – bass, drums (1980–1981)
- Tony Race – drums (1980–1981)
- Gary Ainge – drums, percussion (1981–1989)
- Martin Duffy – keyboards (1985–1989; died 2022)
- Mick Lloyd – bass (1982–1984; died 2016)
- Marco Thomas – bass, guitars (1985–1987)
- Phil King – bass (1986–1987)
- Mick Bund – bass (1988; died 2017)

Timeline

== Discography ==
- Crumbling the Antiseptic Beauty (1982)
- The Splendour of Fear (1984)
- The Strange Idols Pattern and Other Short Stories (1984)
- Ignite the Seven Cannons (1985)
- Let the Snakes Crinkle Their Heads to Death (1986)
- Forever Breathes the Lonely Word (1986)
- Poem of the River (1987)
- The Pictorial Jackson Review (1988)
- Train Above the City (1988)
- Me and a Monkey on the Moon (1989)
