= Shine On (The House of Love song) =

Single by the House of Love

from the album The House of Love
- Released: May 1987 (original); 22 January 1990 (re-recording)
- Genre: Post-punk; neo-psychedelia; proto-shoegaze
- Length: 3:21 (1987); 4:00 (1990)
- Label: Creation (1987); Mercury (1990)
- Songwriter: Guy Chadwick

The House of Love singles chronology
"I Don't Know Why I Love You" (1989)	"Shine On" (1990)	"Beatles and the Stones" (1990)

"Shine On" is a song by the House of Love, written by Guy Chadwick. It was originally released as their debut single in 1987, when the band was on Creation Records, but failed to reach the UK top 100. The band's subsequent singles peaked outside of the top 40 until, in early 1990, "Shine On" was re-recorded, produced by Tim Palmer and re-released. This time the song peaked at No. 20 in the UK, No. 24 in Ireland, No. 4 in Israel and No. 171 in Australia. Their follow-up single, "Beatles and the Stones", was their only other single to reach the UK top 40.

The song is used for the skateboarder Corey Duffel's part in the Osiris Shoes video "Feed the Need" and in Trigger Happy TV series 1 (2000).

In 2006, the song was covered by Apoptygma Berzerk and Stephan Groth.

== Composition ==
"Shine On" has been described as a "classic, full of dark glamour, shimmering, squalling, pre-shoegaze guitars and a massive chorus." It contains heavy use of reverb, with vocals sung by Guy Chadwick. The original version contained background harmonies by Andrea Heukamp, who left the band before the release of the House of Love's self-titled debut album.

PopMatters listed "Shine On" as the 66th-best alternative rock single of the 1980s, praising the song for its "cinematic swirl of delicate beauty, with a thunderous rhythm and Terry Bickers' darkly shimmering guitar."

== Charts ==
Chart (1990)	Peak position
UK Singles (Official Charts)	20
