= Babe Rainbow (album) =

1992 studio album by The House of Love

Studio album by The House of Love
- Released: July 1992
- Genre: Alternative rock
- Length: 43:26
- Label: Fontana
- Producer: Warne Livesey

The House of Love chronology
A Spy in the House of Love (1990)	Babe Rainbow (1992)	Audience with the Mind (1993)

Singles from Babe Rainbow
- 1. "The Girl With the Loneliest Eyes" Released: October 1991; 2. "Feel" Released: April 1992; 3. "You Don't Understand" Released: June 1992; 4. "Crush Me" Released: November 1992

Babe Rainbow is the third album by British alternative rock band The House of Love: it was critically acclaimed by both Select and Spin.

== Background ==
Babe Rainbow is the only House of Love studio album to feature Simon Walker (ex-Dave Howard Singers as well as being Chris Groothuizen and Pete Evans’ bandmate in My White Bedroom). Walker had replaced Terry Bickers as lead guitarist in December 1989 and would himself leave the band in mid-1992 (to be replaced by Simon Mawby of The Woodentops). Former House of Love member Andrea Heukamp returned as a guest performer to add extra guitar and backing vocals.

The album's producer Warne Livesey co-wrote two songs with Guy Chadwick – "You Don’t Understand" and "Feel" – which were the first House of Love songs not entirely written by Chadwick. Both were released as singles, as were "The Girl With the Loneliest Eyes" (which was released as a taster for the album) and "Crush Me". The album's title comes from a picture by Peter Blake which was also used for the cover artwork. The album was mixed by Tim Palmer at Townhouse Studios in London.

== Reception ==
Professional ratings
Review scores
Source	Rating
AllMusic	4/5 stars
NME	7/10
Select	5/5 stars

In his review for Select magazine, David Cavanagh wrote that band made "a heaven-sent album". He qualified it as "brilliant" and "gorgeous" and "as instinctively rock ' n ' roll as the Beatles, the Stones". In Spin, David Quantick wrote that the album "finds the House of Love entering the mainstream with their post-punk English alternative sensibilities intact". Babe Rainbow was not as popular as the first two House of Love albums, however, and signalled the start of the band's commercial decline.

== Track listing ==
All songs written by Guy Chadwick unless otherwise noted

1. "You Don't Understand" - 3:48 (Guy Chadwick, Warne Livesey)
2. "Crush Me" - 3:46
3. "Cruel" - 5:46
4. "High in Your Face" - 4:41
5. "Fade Away" - 3:24
6. "Feel" - 3:54 (Guy Chadwick, Warne Livesey)
7. "Girl with the Loneliest Eyes" - 3:42
8. "Burn Down the World" - 5:53
9. "Philly Phile" - 4:21
10. "Yer Eyes" - 4:11

== Personnel ==
- Guy Chadwick - lead vocals, guitars, bass guitar
- Simon Walker - guitars
- Chris Groothuizen - bass guitar, backing vocals
- Pete Evans –drums

with

- Warne Livesey - guitar, hurdy-gurdy, keyboards, backing vocals
- Andrea Heukamp - guitar, backing vocals
- Pandit Dinesh – tablas
