= Spy in the House of Love =

Spy in the House of Love may refer to:

== Books ==
- A Spy in the House of Love, a 1954 novel by Anaïs Nin

== TV ==
- "Spy in the House of Love" (Dollhouse), a 2009 episode

== Music ==
- A Spy in the House of Love, a 1984 song by The dBs
- "Spy in the House of Love (song)", a 1987 song by Was (Not Was)
- A Spy in the House of Love (album), a 1990 album by The House of Love
- Spy in the House of Love, song by Steve Winwood 1997
- There's a Spy (In the House of Love), a 1989 song by Animal Logic
