= Adorable (band) =

English alternative rock band

- L to R Robert Dillam, Stephen 'Wil' Williams, Pete Fijalkowski, Kevin Gritton (1991)

Background information
- Origin: Coventry, England
- Genres: Alternative rock, shoegaze, noise pop, jangle pop
- Years active: 1990–1994, 2019
- Label: Creation / EMI America Records
- Past members: Pete Fijalkowski; Robert Dillam; Stephen 'Wil' Williams; Kevin Gritton

Adorable were an English alternative rock band, formed in Coventry in 1990. The band consisted of vocalist and guitarist Pete Fijalkowski, guitarist Robert Dillam, bassist Stephen 'Wil' Williams and drummer Kevin Gritton.

== History ==
Adorable formed in September 1990. Prior to that the band was known as The Candy Thieves, and their only record included an early version of "Homeboy" and another song "Underwater" that fitted the then-current baggy trend. The single was released on Trolley Records in 1990. However guitarist Wayne Peters left the band out of frustration with their lack of success and was replaced by Robert Dillam, prompting the name change to Adorable.

Adorable's first gig was in Coventry at the Tic Toc club on the night that the first Gulf War started in January 1991.

After recording a 12" of "Sunshine Smile" ("I'll Be Your Saint" and "Breathless" on the B-side) that was pressed up to be released on record producer Pat Collier's 'Money To Burn' record label, the band received a positive review in the NME. However, the single was never released. They signed to Creation Records in 1992, and after a UK tour supporting Curve, they released their first single, a re-recording of "Sunshine Smile", in April of that year.

"Sunshine Smile" was NME's 'Single of the Week', and topped the UK Indie Chart. The band released "I'll Be Your Saint", "Homeboy" and "Sistine Chapel Ceiling" (another NME Single of the Week), which all went into the Top 5 in the Indie chart. The band's relationship with much of the rest of the music press though was strained and quickly soured. Their album, Against Perfection was released in March 1993, and peaked at No. 70 in the UK Albums Chart. The album's original title Against Creation was dropped 24 hours before they submitted the album to their record label, and reflected their difficult relationship with the label. The band toured the US, Europe, Australia and Japan. The tour of Australia was later recalled as “disastrous” by the band where the "promoters did a runner on us and never paid us" with the money later recovered but not some of the band members' albums they had with them.

The second album, Fake, provided two singles "Kangaroo Court" and "Vendetta", which again entered the UK Indie Chart, but the album failed to dent the mainstream UK Albums Chart. With strained relations within the band, the band were told they had been dropped by Creation (now owned by Sony) before a gig in Colchester in 1994, where they were supported by the 60 Foot Dolls. The band undertook a European tour before announcing their split onstage at the final gig of the tour in Brussels in late 1994.

A retrospective of their work entitled 'Footnotes' was released by Cherry Red in 2008, featuring extensive liner contributions from all four members of the band where they spoke candidly about their experiences whilst in Adorable.

Subsequent to the band's demise, Robert Dillam moved to Scotland where he joined The Zephyrs and is teaching computer networking. Stephen Williams remained in Coventry working in the International Office at the University of Warwick before moving to Nottingham Trent University where he is currently Director of NTU Global, whilst Fijalkowski went on to form the band Polak, who released two albums on One Little Indian. Shortening his name to Pete Fij he joined up with guitarist Terry Bickers of fellow former Creation label mate The House of Love and Levitation under the title of 'Pete Fij / Terry Bickers'; Kevin Gritton rose the ranks to becoming a Headteacher of a comprehensive school in Derby. On the 7 May 2019, the band announced two reunion shows to take place in the UK, one at the Hebden Bridge Trades Club on 31 October 2019 and the other at Bush Hall, London on 2 November 2019. The tour was expanded to include an additional night at the Hebden Bridge Trades Club on the 30 October and an additional night at the Bush Hall on the 1 November. A final show was added at the Scala in London on 3 November.

== Discography ==
=== Studio albums ===
- Against Perfection (1993) No. 70 UK
- Fake (1994)

=== Compilations ===
- Footnotes: Best of 92–94 (January 2008, Cherry Red)

=== Singles ===
- "Sunshine Smile" (20 April 1992) - UK No. 85 / US Billboard Alternative Songs No. 29
- "I'll Be Your Saint" (13 July 1992) - UK No. 90
- "Homeboy" (26 October 1992) UK No. 121
- "Sistine Chapel Ceiling" (January 1993) UK No. 97
- "Favourite Fallen Idol" (12 April 1993) UK No. 103
- "Kangaroo Court" (April 1994) - UK No. 96
- "Vendetta" (September 1994) - UK No. 99
