= The House of Love (1990 album) =

Studio album by The House of Love
- Released: 26 February 1990
- Genre: Alternative rock
- Length: 49:06
- Label: Fontana
- Producer: The House of Love; Dave Meegan; Paul Staveley O'Duffy; Stephen Hague; Tim Palmer

The House of Love chronology
The House of Love (1988)	The House of Love (1990)	A Spy in the House of Love (1990)

Singles from The House of Love
- 1. "Never"; 2. "I Don't Know Why I Love You" Released: October 1989; 3. "Shine On" Released: January 1990; 4. "Beatles and the Stones" Released: March 1990

Professional ratings
Review scores
Source	Rating
AllMusic	4.5/5 stars
Chicago Tribune	3.5/4 stars
Entertainment Weekly	A−
NME	8/10
Q	3/5 stars
Record Mirror	4 1/2/5
Rolling Stone	3/5 stars
Sounds	4/5 stars

The House of Love is the second album by British alternative rock band the House of Love, released on Fontana Records in 1990. It should not be confused with the band's debut album, which is also called The House of Love. It is generally referred to either as Fontana (after the record label it was issued on) or The Butterfly Album (after Trevor Key's sleeve art).

== Background ==
The recording and mixing of The House of Love was beset with problems, with the band members distracted by hedonism, ego and indecision. Group leader Guy Chadwick would later comment "we really needed guidance at that crucial point. Most groups just go nuts. It's like this huge trolley full of booze being placed in front of you. With a whiff of success, people change towards you. We were taking too many drugs, I was drinking ridiculously and that's the worst combination when things are going wrong."

As opposed to the recording of the debut album (which had only taken one week, despite a protracted and argumentative mixing period afterwards), the new recordings were spread out over two years in multiple studios and would involve the work of four different producers (Dave Meegan, Paul Staveley O'Duffy, Stephen Hague and Tim Palmer) as well as production involvement by the band members themselves. The band would find themselves at odds with their A&R man Dave Bates, who saw the band as generators of hit singles and who had selected the album producers (whom Chadwick deemed "quite obviously wrong for us") as well as commissioning remixes which the band loathed and had not authorised.

During the slow and argumentative recording process, The House of Love's rhythm section Chris Groothuizen and Pete Evans would moonlight as members of a separate band, My White Bedroom. More seriously affected was lead guitarist Terry Bickers, an introverted character who was already unhappy with the implications of the band's deal with Fontana. Bickers would retreat into manic depression as his relationship with Chadwick deteriorated into a non-speaking one in which the two were more likely to communicate by post rather than have a face-to-face conversation. Following the completion of the album, Bickers would acrimoniously quit The House of Love during the early days of the sixty-date promotional tour. A couple of years later he would comment "I just found at the time that I didn't have the same aspirations as the rest of the band. I was more into exploring music than exploring the exploitation of markets around the globe. They were really into crusading. And winning. I wasn't."

== Singles ==
The House of Love would eventually generate four singles. The first of these was "Never" (issued against the band's wishes) which stalled at number 41 on the UK Singles Chart on release in 1989, as did the November follow-up "I Don't Know Why I Love You" (although the latter would achieve greater success as a Radio 1 Single of the Week and in reaching number 2 on the Modern Rock chart in the US). The third single was a re-recording of the band's debut single "Shine On", which became the band's biggest and best-known British hit (reaching number 20). The last of the four was "The Beatles and the Stones", which reached number 36.

== Re-recordings ==
Several tracks on the album were re-recordings of previously released House of Love songs. The most obvious of these was "Shine On", but both "The Hedonist" and "Blind" had previously been B-sides of singles released on Creation Records.

== Track listing ==
All tracks composed by Guy Chadwick.

1. "Hannah" – 5:42
2. "Shine On" – 4:00
3. "Beatles and the Stones" – 4:22
4. "Shake and Crawl" – 3:40
5. "Hedonist" – 3:36
6. "I Don't Know Why I Love You" – 3:29
7. "Never" – 3:43
8. "Someone's Got to Love You" – 3:39
9. "In a Room" – 4:05
10. "Blind" – 3:43
11. "32nd Floor" – 4:05
12. "Se Dest" – 5:02

== Personnel ==
- Guy Chadwick – vocals, guitars
- Terry Bickers – lead guitar, backing vocals
- Chris Groothuizen – bass guitar
- Pete Evans – drums
