= Fijałkowski =

Fijałkowski is a surname. Notable people with the surname include:

- Antoni Melchior Fijałkowski (1778–1861), former Archbishop of Warsaw
- Czesław Młot-Fijałkowski (1892–1944), Polish brigadier general
- Pete Fijalkowski (born 1968), English vocalist, guitarist, and songwriter
