= Kangaroo court (disambiguation) =

Kangaroo court is an informal pejorative term for a court that ignores recognized standards of law or justice.

Kangaroo court may also refer to:

- "Kangaroo Court" (song), a 2012 song by Capital Cities
- "Kangaroo Court" (Adorable song), from the 1994 album Fake
- Kangaroo Court (EP), a 1983 EP by Ritual
- "Kangaroo Court" (Brockmire), a 2017 television episode
