= I Don't Know Why I Love You (The House of Love song) =

Single by the House of Love

from the album The House of Love
- Released: 30 October 1989
- Genre: Alternative rock
- Length: 3:33 (album version); 3:05 (single edit)
- Label: Fontana
- Songwriter(s): Guy Chadwick
- Producer(s): Stephen Hague; Dave Meegan

The House of Love singles chronology
"Never" (1989)	"I Don't Know Why I Love You" (1989)	"Shine On" (1990)

Music video
- "I Don't Know Why I Love You" on YouTube

"I Don't Know Why I Love You" is a song from English alternative rock band the House of Love, which was released by Fontana in the UK in 1989 as the second single from their second studio album The House of Love (1990). The song was written by Guy Chadwick, and produced by Stephen Hague and Dave Meegan. "I Don't Know Why I Love You" peaked at number 41 in the UK Singles Chart.

In 1990, the song was released as a single in the US and as an extended play in Canada. In the US, the song reached number 2 on the Billboard Modern Rock Tracks chart and its music video achieved Buzz Bin status on MTV.

== Background ==
Speaking of the song's release as a single in the UK, the band's frontman Guy Chadwick told New Musical Express in 1990, "I didn't think [it] was going to be a hit. Phonogram were disappointed but I wasn't. I did tell them! It was the first decent thing we'd done for a year but it didn't sound contemporary to me." He added to Cash Box that same year, "I didn't think it was going to be a hit in England, but I was proud of it. I knew that we had made a good record, and I knew that a lot of our fans would like it. We put in a lot of effort into all of the B-sides and extra tracks. But I knew it wasn't going to be a hit single."

== Critical reception ==
On its release, Simon Williams of New Musical Express picked "I Don't Know Why I Love You" as one of the magazine's "singles of the week". He described the song as "pleading, bleeding pop genius" and "an example of storming creative simplicity, kicking off like a Jesus Jones sample and climaxing as the collective's finest moment yet". In a review of The House of Love, Robin Denselow of The Guardian felt the song "surely deserved to be a hit" and noted it "mixes some controlled wailing guitar work into an efficient, straightforward, tuneful pop song". Brent Ainsworth of the Santa Cruz Sentinel praised the song as "one of the most captivating modern rock songs of 1990". He added, "Its mix of acoustic and electric guitar is an aromatic blend, and Chadwick's lyrics relay the band's quizzical stance on romance."

== Formats ==
7-inch (UK) and cassette single (UK and US)
No.	Title	Length
1.	"I Don't Know Why I Love You"	3:05
2.	"Secrets"	2:22

7-inch limited edition single (UK)
No.	Title	Length
1.	"I Don't Know Why I Love You"	3:05
2.	"Love II"	4:44

Cassette, 12-inch and CD extended play (Canada)
No.	Title	Length
1.	"I Don't Know Why I Love You"	3:33
2.	"Secrets"	2:25
3.	"I Can't Stand It"	4:18
4.	"Clothes"	2:50

12-inch single (UK) and 12-inch promotional single (UK and US)
No.	Title	Length
1.	"I Don't Know Why I Love You"	3:30
2.	"Secrets"	2:25
3.	"I Can't Stand It"	4:18

12-inch single (UK #2)
No.	Title	Length
1.	"I Don't Know Why I Love You"	3:32
2.	"Clothes"	2:50
3.	"Secrets"	2:25
4.	"The Spy"	4:10

CD single (UK #1 and #2 and Europe)
No.	Title	Length
1.	"I Don't Know Why I Love You"	3:33
2.	"Secrets"	2:25
3.	"I Can't Stand It"	4:18
4.	"Clothes"	2:50

CD promotional single (US)
No.	Title	Length
1.	"I Don't Know Why I Love You"	3:30

== Personnel ==
Credits are adapted from the UK/European CD single, UK 12-inch single and UK limited edition 7-inch single.

The House of Love

- Guy Chadwick – vocals, guitars
- Terry Bickers – lead guitar, backing vocals
- Chris Groothuizen – bass guitar
- Pete Evans – drums

Production

- Stephen Hague – producer on "I Don't Know Why I Love You"
- Dave Meegan – producer and mixing on "I Don't Know Why I Love You"
- The House of Love – all tracks except "I Don't Know Why I Love You"

Other

- Suzi Gibbons – photography

== Charts ==
Chart (1989–90)	Peak position
UK Singles (OCC)	41
US Modern Rock Tracks (Billboard)	2
