= Audience with the Mind =

Studio album by The House of Love
- Released: June 1993
- Genre: Alternative rock
- Length: 50:21
- Label: Fontana, Mercury
- Producer: The House of Love

The House of Love chronology
Babe Rainbow (1992)	Audience with the Mind (1993)	Days Run Away (2005)

Professional ratings
Review scores
Source	Rating
AllMusic	2/5 stars
The Encyclopedia of Popular Music	2/5 stars
MusicHound Rock: The Essential Album Guide	1/5 stars
New Musical Express	5/10

Audience with the Mind is the fourth studio album by British alternative rock band The House of Love. It was the band's final new release until 2005.

== Background ==
Audience With the Mind was recorded following the departure of the band’s third successive lead guitarist in three years, Simon Mawby. This resulting in group leader Guy Chadwick recording most of the album’s guitar parts himself (although Sean O'Hagan of The High Llamas provided additional acoustic and slide guitars). As had been the case on the band’s previous album, Babe Rainbow, former band member Andrea Heukamp provided backing vocals. The album generated one single, "Hollow".

Close to the album’s release in 1993, House of Love drummer Pete Evans announced his own departure to the group. Chadwick was left to promote the finished album by himself: unsupported by live appearances, it performed poorly commercially. The House of Love would split up entirely shortly afterwards and would not reunite until 2005.

== Critical reception ==
MusicHound Rock: The Essential Album Guide called the album "uncharacteristically dreary" and "a tough listen." Trouser Press wrote that "even half-baked and shoddily written, House of Love could routinely extract a tension, drama and resignation rarely found in modern pop."

== Track listing ==
(All songs written by Guy Chadwick except where noted)

1. "Sweet Anatomy" (Pete Evans) -3:37
2. "Audience with the Mind" -3:34
3. "Haloes" -3:34
4. "Erosion" (Chris Groothuizen) -3:21
5. "Call Me" -4:11
6. "Shining On" -3:59
7. "Portrait in Atlanta" -4:29
8. "Corridors" -3:34
9. "Hollow" (Chris Groothuizen) -4:49
10. "All Night Long" -2:29
11. "Into the Tunnel" -8:11
12. "You've Got to Feel" -4:33

== Personnel ==
- Guy Chadwick - lead vocals, guitars
- Chris Groothuizen - bass guitar
- Pete Evans - drums

with

- Andrea Heukamp - backing vocals
- Sean O'Hagan - acoustic & slide guitars
