= Days Run Away =

Studio album by The House of Love
- Released: 2005
- Genre: Indie rock
- Length: 37:17
- Label: Art & Industry
- Producer: The House of Love

The House of Love chronology
Audience with the Mind (1993)	Days Run Away (2005)	She Paints Words in Red (2013)

Professional ratings
Aggregate scores
Source	Rating
Metacritic	68/100
Review scores
Source	Rating
Allmusic	3.5/5 stars
BBC Music	(favourable)
The Boston Phoenix	3/5 stars
The Guardian	4/5 stars
PowerPop Overdose	4/5 stars
Stylus Magazine	C

Days Run Away is the fifth studio album by British alternative rock band The House of Love, released in 2005 on Art & Industry Records. It was the band's first new release since 1993 and saw a reunion of the band, featuring the return of original lead guitarist Terry Bickers (although not bass guitarist Chris Groothuizen).

== Background ==
The House of Love had been defunct since splitting up in 1993, with former group leader Guy Chadwick having made fitful attempts at other projects in the intervening years. He had been estranged from the band's former lead guitarist Terry Bickers since the latter's acrimonious exit from the band at the end of 1989, following several years of frustrating recording sessions, drug abuse and mental imbalance. Bickers had subsequently spent time in bands including Levitation, Cradle and Monkey Island and dealt with his personal issues.

Circa 2000, Bickers and Chadwick reestablished contact and began to rebuild their friendship, aided by their mutual experience of fighting depression. In 2003, the House of Love's former agent Mick Griffiths persuaded Chadwick and Bickers to reunite as songwriting partners. This in turn led to a reunion of the original band (minus guitarist and singer Andrea Heukamp and bass guitarist Chris Groothuizen, the latter of whom opted instead to continue his career as an architect). Following recording sessions done at the band's own pace, and without record company involvement (one of the factors which had contributed strongly to Bickers' original departure over a decade previously), Days Run Away was released in 2005 on the Art and Industry label. The band went on to tour throughout the UK, Ireland and Sweden to support the release.

== Track listing ==
All tracks are written by Guy Chadwick and Terry Bickers.

No.	Title	Length
1.	"Love You Too Much"	2.41
2.	"Gotta Be That Way"	3.52
3.	"Maybe You Know"	3.03
4.	"Kinda Love"	4.33
5.	"Money and Time"	5.03
6.	"Days Run Away"	4.06
7.	"Already Gone"	3.23
8.	"Wheels"	2.53
9.	"Kit Carter"	3.58
10.	"Anyday I Want"	3.45

The Japanese edition of the album released on V2 Records includes two additional tracks: live versions Of "Shine On" and "I Don't Know Why I Love You".

== Personnel ==
- Guy Chadwick – lead vocals, guitars
- Terry Bickers – guitars, backing vocals
- Matt Jury – bass
- Pete Evans – drums
