= Against Perfection =

Studio album by Adorable
- Released: 1 March 1993
- Studio: Greenhouse Studio, London; The Beat Factory, London
- Genre: Shoegaze
- Length: 48:50
- Label: Creation
- Producer: Pat Collier; Alan Moulder (track 5)

Adorable chronology
Against Perfection (1993)	Fake (1994)

Singles from Against Perfection
- 1. "Sunshine Smile" Released: 20 April 1992; 2. "I'll Be Your Saint" Released: 13 July 1992; 3. "Homeboy" Released: 26 October 1992; 4. "Sistine Chapel Ceiling" Released: 25 January 1993; 5. "Favourite Fallen Idol" Released: 12 April 1993

Against Perfection is the debut album by the British alternative rock band Adorable. It was released in the UK on 1 March 1993 on Creation Records and in the United States by SBK. The band supported the album with a North American tour.

"Still Life" was recorded without the inclusion of drums. "Sunshine Smile" was a college radio hit.

== Critical reception ==
Professional ratings
Review scores
Source	Rating
AllMusic	4/5 stars
Select	3/5

The Washington Post wrote that the album "sometimes balances the harsh and the lyrical in the manner of My Bloody Valentine, but ultimately seems more indebted to the minor-key epics of early Echo and the Bunnymen." The Waterloo Region Record noted that "all twelve songs on this release sound pretty much the same, with Piotr Fijalkowski's very power-wave British vocals set against guitars that threaten to jangle but usually just screech." Trouser Press praised the "sharp, varied songs that are by turns pretty, soaring and brooding."

In 2016, Pitchfork ranked Against Perfection at number 42 on its list of "The 50 Best Shoegaze Albums of All Time".

== Track listing ==
UK version

1. "Glorious" – 4:17
2. "Favourite Fallen Idol" – 2:41
3. "A to Fade In" – 4:50
4. "I Know You Too Well" – 3:41
5. "Homeboy" – 4:30
6. "Sistine Chapel Ceiling" – 3:34
7. "Cut #2" – 4:43
8. "Crash Sight" – 4:02
9. "Still Life" – 2:37
10. "Breathless" – 5:18

US version

1. "Sunshine Smile" – 5:03
2. "Glorious" – 4:17
3. "Favourite Fallen Idol" – 2:41
4. "A to Fade In" – 4:50
5. "I Know You Too Well" – 3:41
6. "Homeboy" – 4:30
7. "Sistine Chapel Ceiling" – 3:34
8. "Cut #2" – 4:43
9. "Crash Sight" – 4:02
10. "Still Life" – 2:37
11. "Breathless" – 5:18
12. "I'll Be Your Saint" – 3:32

Japan version

1. "Glorious" – 4:17
2. "Favourite Fallen Idol" – 2:41
3. "A to Fade In" – 4:50
4. "I Know You Too Well" – 3:41
5. "Homeboy" – 4:30
6. "Sistine Chapel Ceiling" – 3:34
7. "Cut #2" – 4:43
8. "Crash Sight" – 4:02
9. "Still Life" – 2:37
10. "Breathless" – 5:18
11. "Sunshine Smile" – 5:03
12. "I'll Be Your Saint" – 3:32
13. "Summerside" – 2:49

== Personnel ==
- Piotr Fijalkowski – vocals, guitar
- Robert Dillam – guitar
- Stephen "Wil" Williams – bass
- Kevin Gritton – drums

== Charts ==
Chart (1992)	Peak; position
UK Albums (OCC)	70
