= Fake (album) =

Studio album by Adorable
- Released: 16 September 1994
- Genre: Shoegaze
- Length: 41:37
- Label: Creation Records - CRELP 165
- Producer: Paul Corkett, Pat Collier

Adorable chronology
Against Perfection (1993)	Fake (1994)

Professional ratings
Review scores
Source	Rating
AllMusic	3/5 stars

Fake is the second and final album by British alternative rock band Adorable, released in 1994. The sound of the album was influenced by American indie rock, a shift from the Shoegaze and Bunnymen influence of the band's debut. The album sold poorly, and Adorable were dropped from their label.

== Reception ==
Trouser Press wrote that Fake "meets the sophomore challenge with surprising grace and ease. A more coherent, ambitious album that flows far better than its predecessor, it possesses twice the bite, more interesting guitar passages and an underlying obstinacy that fuels the immaculately built tunes."

== Track listing ==
1. "Feed Me" – 3:29
2. "Vendetta" – 4:10
3. "Man in a Suitcase" – 4:48
4. "Submarine" – 4:29
5. "Lettergo" – 3:59
6. "Kangaroo Court" – 3:27
7. "Radio Days" – 3:36
8. "Go Easy on Her" – 4:33
9. "Road Movie" – 4:17
10. "Have You Seen the Light" – 4:49

== Personnel ==
- Piotr Fijalkowski – vocals, guitar
- Robert Dillam – guitar
- Stephen 'Wil' Williams – bass
- Kevin Gritton – drums
