= Jaws Wired Shut =

- The Simpsons episode
- Episode no.: Season 13; Episode 9
- Directed by: Nancy Kruse
- Written by: Matt Selman
- Production code: DABF05
- Original air date: January 27, 2002

Guest appearances
- Dana Gould and John Kassir (in Gould's scene he is writing a single script for The Simpsons called "Poppa's Got a Brand New Badge"); Pamela Hayden as Lisa Ling and Joy Behar

Episode features
- Couch gag: The Simpsons are dressed as silent film characters, with Homer as Charlie Chaplin (as the Tramp).
- Commentary: Matt Groening; Al Jean; Matt Selman; Carolyn Omine; Dana Gould; Joe Mantegna; Pete Michels

Episode chronology
← Previous "Sweets and Sour Marge"	Next → "Half-Decent Proposal"
- The Simpsons season 13

"Jaws Wired Shut" is the ninth episode of the thirteenth season of the American animated television series The Simpsons. It originally aired on the Fox network in the United States on January 27, 2002.

The episode was written by Matt Selman and directed by Nancy Kruse. The plot idea for the episode was pitched by Selman, as was the setpiece, which originated from a discussion he had with current showrunner Al Jean. Comedian John Kassir guest-starred as one of the gay dogs in the pride parade in the episode. In its original broadcast, the episode was seen by approximately 8.7 million viewers, making it the most watched scripted program on Fox that night.

Following its home video release, "Jaws Wired Shut" received mostly positive reviews from critics.

== Plot ==
When the Springfield gay pride parade passes by the Simpsons' house, Santa's Little Helper becomes tempted when three of the gay dogs start flirting with him. Uncomfortable, Homer drags his family to the Springfield Googolplex. After growing impatient at several previews and public service announcements preceding the film, Homer flies into a rampage and demands the movie start. Wielding oversized Kit Kat bars, the ushers chase Homer from the cinema. While Homer is fleeing, his mouth collides with the fist of a large metal statue of boxer Drederick Tatum, breaking his jaw in the process.

At Springfield General Hospital, Dr. Hibbert wires Homer's broken jaw shut, leaving him unable to speak or eat solid food, much to his dismay. Homer is forced to listen to his family, and becomes more attentive and sympathetic to their daily struggles, which pleases them, especially Marge. Since Homer is so well-behaved, Marge risks attending the annual formal event at the country club. When Homer's jaw wires are removed the next day, he and Marge appear on Afternoon Yak to discuss his transformation. With the help of the show's hosts, Marge pleads with Homer to abandon his "reckless ways" and stay well-behaved. Despite the temptation of an upcoming demolition derby, Homer behaves for Marge's sake.

Five weeks later, Marge — bored with the sudden peace and quiet — enters the demolition derby. When Homer wakes and finds Marge gone, he heads to the derby with the kids to stop her. At first Marge enjoys the derby, but things soon get too dangerous for her. Since he has given up recklessness, Homer has no idea how to save her. Bart has an idea: he orders a can of beer from a vendor. After Homer drinks the beer the way Popeye eats spinach for a burst of energy, he rescues Marge. She makes him promise not to make her the live wire of the family.

== Production ==
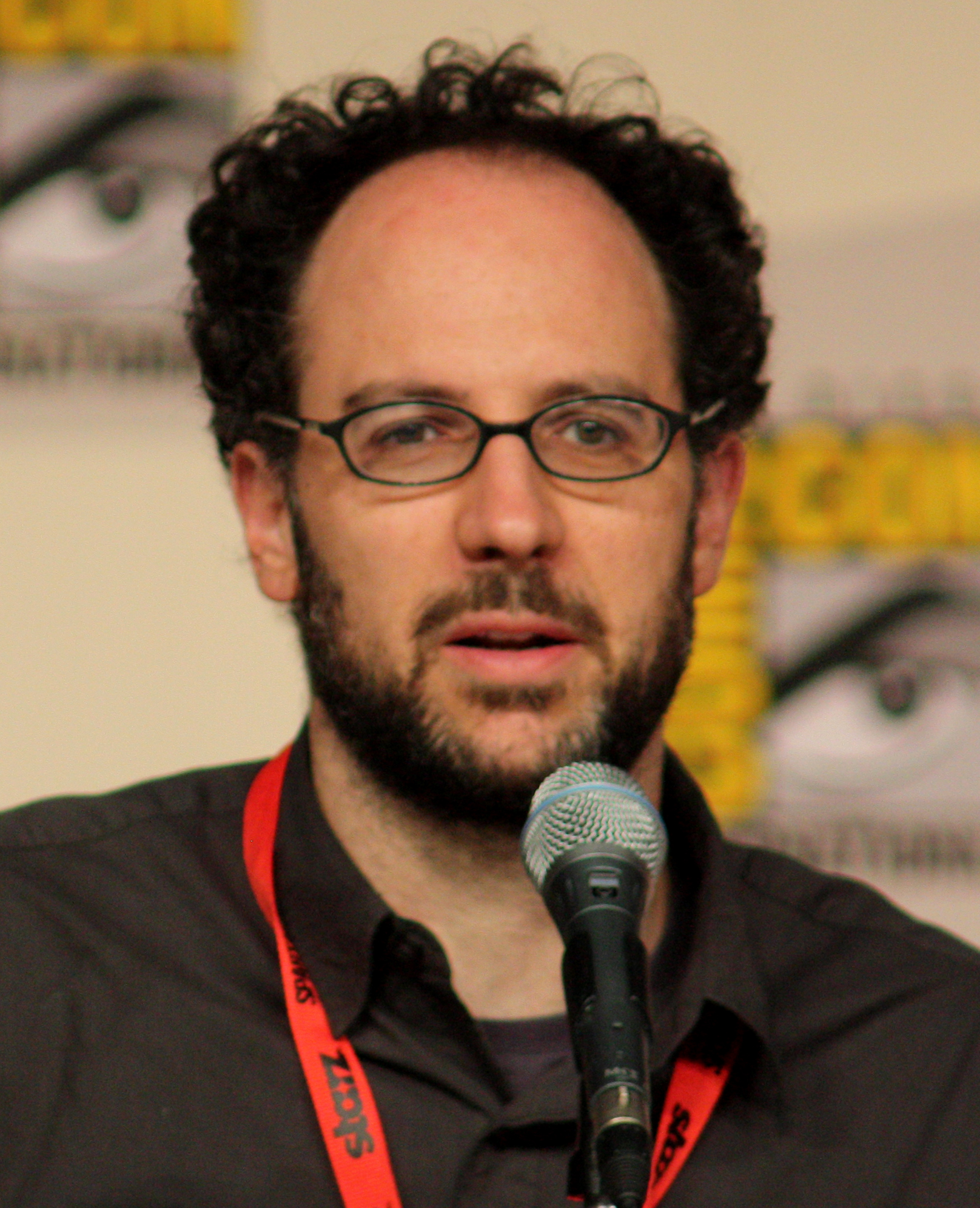
The episode was written by Matt Selman.

The episode was written by executive producer Matt Selman and directed by Nancy Kruse. It was first broadcast on the Fox network in the United States on January 27, 2002. The episode's setpiece was pitched by Selman, and originated from a discussion he had with current showrunner Al Jean, about "how much crap there is at the movie theater before the movie actually begins." The episode's plot was also pitched by Selman, who had wanted to do an episode with a "jaws-wired-shut plot" for a while. It was not until long after the episode was completed that Selman learned that one can in fact talk with one's jaw wired shut. He learned this from fellow Simpsons writer Brian Kelley, who had had his jaw wired shut once in high school. Kelley joined the writing staff during the writing stage of the episode; however, he did not mention that one could talk, since he did not want to "ruin" the episode. However, he did say that one should eat a lot before since one will lose weight when their jaw is wired shut. These bits were subsequently included in the episode.

According to Jean, the episode's table read went "great" until the third act. The Simpsons writers found the third act "pretty challenging" to write, because by having Homer's jaws wired shut, they "took [their] funniest character" and "remove[d] comedy." In the DVD commentary for the episode, Selman described it as "It's the comedy of saying: 'Oh, he [Homer] can't do all the stuff you want him to do'." It was also hard to "keep the story moving" back to normal, since they kept having to "re-use the premise". The episode features American comedian John Kassir as one of the dogs in the gay pride parade in the beginning of the episode. Barbara Walters and Star Jones, the hosts of The View, were portrayed by American voice-actor Tress MacNeille. In the DVD commentary for the episode, Jean stated that MacNeille is "very versatile". Lisa Ling and Joy Behar were portrayed by voice-actor Pamela Hayden.

== Cultural references ==
The title of the episode was pitched by The Simpsons writer Max Pross, and is a reference to Stanley Kubrick's 1999 drama film Eyes Wide Shut. According to Jean, the writers chose the title because "[they] thought it would have been more well-remembered." When Homer's jaw is wired shut, he writes words on a portable chalkboard to communicate with people. This is a reference to Anthony Hopkins' character in Legends of the Fall, who, after having a stroke, also communicates with people using a chalkboard. The song used in the ballet scene is "The Blue Danube Waltz", which was also used in 2001: A Space Odyssey, another film by Kubrick.

A scene in the episode takes place on the talk show "Afternoon Yak", a parody of The View, with the hosts based on The View's real-life host Barbara Walters and Joy Behar, and former hosts Lisa Ling and Star Jones. The View's audience members are also referenced, and are depicted in the episode as "giv[ing] a huge response" to everything in the program. The play that Bart and Homer are rehearsing in the living room was written by American playwright Edward Albee. Near the end of the episode, Homer gains strength by drinking a can of beer. The scene parodies the character Popeye, who gained super-strength from eating spinach. Homer also talks in a manner similar to Popeye after drinking the beer. Marge also resembles Popeye's love interest Olive Oyl in the scene.

Another scene shows the Simpsons in a movie theater, where Lisa tries to solve the following quiz: "Name that character: MOT HANKS". She answers, seemingly obvious, "Tom Hanks", while the right answer turns out to be "Otm Shank", "India's answer to Brian Dennehy" according to fellow moviegoer Apu. The Itchy & Scratchy PSA showing at the theater is titled "To Kill a Talking Bird", a play on the 1960 novel To Kill a Mockingbird. Additionally, Binky from Life In Hell appears behind Itchy.

The sign on the Springfield Civic Center mentions that the demolition derby was featured in the 1985 film Faces of Death III, an entry in the controversial mondo horror film series Faces of Death.

== Release ==
In its original U.S. broadcast on January 27, 2002, "Jaws Wired Shut" received an 8.7 rating, according to Nielsen Media Research, translating to approximately 8.7 million viewers. The episode finished in 22nd place in the ratings for the week of January 21–27, 2002, making it the most watched scripted program on Fox that night. On August 24, 2010, "Jaws Wired Shut" was released as part of The Simpsons: The Complete Thirteenth Season DVD and Blu-ray set. Matt Groening, Al Jean, Matt Selman, Carolyn Omine, Dana Gould, Joe Mantegna and Pete Michels participated in the audio commentary of the episode.

This episode, in particular, is a welcome return to a more old school Simpsons storytelling style, capable of being both comical, and, in its own bizarro way, touching. With the advent of South Park and other edgy animated sitcoms, it's easy to see how The Simpsons felt pressured to drop its sense of sentiment and go for more outlandish gags, so it's good to occasionally see the softer side of Homer.

— Casey Broadwater, Blu-ray.com

Following its home video release, "Jaws Wired Shut" received mostly positive reviews from critics.

Stuart O'Conner of Screen Jabber described "Jaws Wired Shut", "The Parent Rap", "She of Little Faith" and "Poppa's Got a Brand New Badge" as "first-rate ep[isodes]."

Giving the episode a B+, Jennifer Malkowski of DVD Verdict described the episode as having "nicely gooey family moments." She called the "gay pride parade's 'Salute to Safer Sex' float" the episode's "highlight".

Casey Broadwater of Blu-ray.com gave the episode a positive review as well, calling it "a welcome return to a more old school Simpsons storytelling style, capable of being both comical, and, in its own bizarro way, touching."

Colin Jacobson of DVD Movie Guide wrote "While Season 13 doesn’t threaten to approach the high standards of the series’ strongest years, episodes like "Shut" help make it better than expected. Sure, it follows fairly predictable patterns, but it develops them in a satisfying comedic manner." He concluded his review by writing that the episode's overall "entertaining," even though its ending "falters."

On the other hand, Ron Martin of 411Mania gave the episode a mixed review, calling it "uneven at best, mediocre at worst." Although he praised the episode's setpiece, Nate Boss of Project-Blu gave the episode an overall negative review, writing: "With a hilarious take on movie theaters to start the episode, the duldrum [sic] of the rest can be forgiven...almost."

Adam Rayner of Obsessed with Film wrote that the episode was "woefully weak" and felt "contrived, rushed and handled by hacks." He added that the episode was "Dull".

In an article on gay marriage, The Economist references the Simpsons' blasé acceptance of the annual Springfield gay pride parade in this episode as being "a few steps ahead of real life. But only a few".

Matt Selman was nominated for the Writers Guild of America Award for Outstanding Writing in Animation at the 55th Writers Guild of America Awards for his script to this episode.
