= Colenso Parade =

Alternative rock band from Northern Ireland

- Origin: Belfast, Northern Ireland
- Genres: Alternative rock
- Years active: 1984–1986
- Labels: Goliath, Fire Records (UK)
- Members: Oscar; Linda Clandinning; Neil Lawson; Jackie Forgie (1984–1985); Robert Wakeman (1984–1986); Terry Bickers (1985–1986); John Watt (1986); Owen Howell (1986)

Colenso Parade were an alternative rock band from Belfast, Northern Ireland formed in 1984. Taking their name from a street in the Stranmillis area of their native city, the original line-up was Oscar (Thomas) Askin (vocals), Linda Clendinning (keyboards), Andrew Middleton later replaced by Neil Lawson (bass guitar), Jackie Forgie (guitar) and Jeff Beattie later replaced by Robert Wakeman (drums). After releasing two singles on their own Goliath label, they moved to London and signed to their manager Dave Bedford's Fire Records, with Forgie being replaced by future The House of Love/Levitation guitarist Terry Bickers. After an EP on Fire Records (Hallelujah Chorus and Other Coyote Yelps) and a subsequent LP, Bickers departed to join The House of Love, to be replaced by John Watt (previously of Kissed Air and currently composer for BBC's Dragons' Den). Wakeman also left, his replacement being ex-Big Self drummer Owen Howell. Their next release, "Fontana Eyes" was arguably their best, receiving heavy airplay, although they split soon after, in 1986. Singer Oscar was offered the job of replacing Ian McCulloch in Echo & the Bunnymen but declined, and went on to work in corporate events as MD of the Technical Production company Metro Ecosse. Drummer Wakeman later resurfaced in the band Salad.

== Discography ==
=== Singles ===
- "Standing Up" (1984, Goliath)
- "Down By The Border" (1985, Goliath)
- Hallelujah Chorus and other Coyote Yelps EP (1985, Fire)
- "Fontana Eyes" (1986, Fire)

=== Albums ===
- Glentoran (1986, Fire)
