= Half-Decent Proposal =

- The Simpsons episode
- Episode no.: Season 13; Episode 10
- Directed by: Lauren MacMullan
- Written by: Tim Long
- Production code: DABF04
- Original air date: February 10, 2002

Guest appearance
- Jon Lovitz as Artie Ziff

Episode features
- Chalkboard gag: "I will not bite the hand that feeds me Butterfingers"
- Couch gag: The Simpsons arrive to find two repo men taking the couch away.
- Commentary: Al Jean; Ian Maxtone-Graham; Matt Selman; Tim Long; Dan Castellaneta; Lauren MacMullan; Matt Warburton; James Lipton

Episode chronology
← Previous "Jaws Wired Shut"	Next → "The Bart Wants What It Wants"
- The Simpsons season 13

"Half-Decent Proposal" is the tenth episode of the thirteenth season of the American animated television series The Simpsons. It first aired on the Fox network in the United States on February 10, 2002. In the episode, Homer's snoring interferes with Marge's sleep. To earn money to cure Homer's snoring, Marge agrees to spend a weekend with Artie Ziff if he vows to not grope her as he did during their high-school prom date ("The Way We Was"). While spying on Marge and Artie, Homer mistakenly thinks they are making out, so he leaves with Lenny to work on an oil rig.

Although the episode was written by Tim Long, the idea for the episode was pitched by series' co-creator and executive producer James L. Brooks. The episode was directed by Lauren MacMullan, who ordered several complicated sequences from the animators, leading to some tensions among The Simpsons staff. The episode's plot and title is based on the 1993 film Indecent Proposal, and the episode also features references to M*A*S*H, Midnight Cowboy and Five Easy Pieces. The episode features Jon Lovitz as Artie Ziff, the first time he portrayed Ziff since the season 2 episode "The Way We Was".

In its original broadcast, the episode was seen by approximately 7.5 million viewers and finished in 36th place in the ratings the week it aired.

Since its original broadcast, "Half-Decent Proposal" has received mostly positive reviews from critics, some of whom considered it among the best episodes of the season. However, the episode has also been criticized for parodying Indecent Proposal nine years after its release, a criticism that the episode's showrunner Al Jean responded to in the episode's DVD commentary.

== Plot ==
Marge grows irritated when Homer's loud snoring keeps her awake at night. Dr. Hibbert recommends an expensive surgery to correct the problem, but balks when Homer asks him to do it for free. While spending the night with Patty and Selma to get some sleep, Marge hears a news report that her old high school boyfriend, Artie Ziff, is now the fifth-richest man in the United States. She drunkenly dictates an e-mail to Artie to congratulate him on his success, but Patty and Selma turn it into a sexually provocative message, to Marge's horror.

Artie, who has been deeply obsessed with Marge since high school, flies to Springfield and makes the Simpsons an offer: $1 million to spend a weekend with Marge to show her what life would be like if they were married. Eventually Marge accepts the offer to cure Homer's snoring. At first she enjoys Artie's company, but during a re-enactment of their high school prom, he tricks her into making out against her will. While trying to sneak into the prom, Homer sees them kissing and is devastated, not knowing the exact circumstances. A furious Marge leaves Artie and returns home to find Homer gone and a taped message saying he has left Springfield with Lenny — similarly despondent over his relationship with Carl—to work at an oil field.

While working on an oil rig in West Springfield, Homer and Lenny accidentally set fire to an ant. The flames quickly spread and set the entire rig ablaze, endangering both men's lives. Bart tracks down Homer's location, worrying the entire family because West Springfield is a death trap. Marge puts aside her anger with Artie and calls him for help. He picks her up in his private helicopter and flies to West Springfield to save Homer and Lenny. At first Homer is reluctant to accept his help, but Artie admits defeat and tells Homer he could never win Marge's love, even with his fortune. Lenny is surprised to see Carl is also aboard the helicopter. He and Homer are saved just before the rig collapses.

Instead of paying the Simpsons $1 million, Artie gives Homer a device in mask form that converts his snoring to soothing music. The device also allows Artie to watch Marge through a hidden camera and deliver subliminal messages to persuade her to leave Homer which causes Marge to wake up in shock.

== Production ==
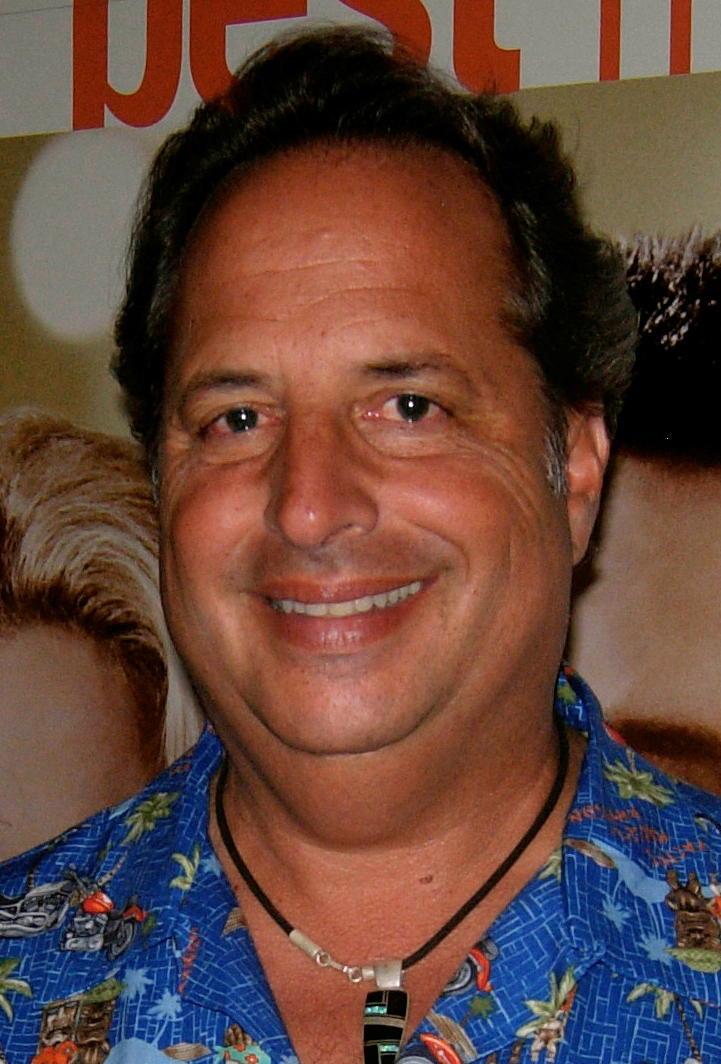
Jon Lovitz reprised his role as Artie Ziff in "Half-Decent Proposal".

"Half-Decent Proposal" was written by consulting producer Tim Long and directed by Lauren MacMullan. Serving as assistant director for MacMullan was Raymond Persi, who later became, according to current show-runner Al Jean, one of the series' "best regular directors". The episode was first broadcast on the Fox network in the United States on February 10, 2002. The idea for the episode was pitched by James L. Brooks, who is one of the series' co-creators and executive producers. He suggested an episode in which Artie Ziff returns and offers Homer a million dollars in exchange for spending a weekend with Marge, trying to convince her to divorce Homer. He also wanted the episode to parody the film Indecent Proposal. Ziff's wealth had been established in the season 4 episode "The Front", in which it was revealed that he had become "stinking rich". The setpiece of "Half-Decent Proposal", in which Homer's snoring is keeping Marge awake during the night, was pitched by Long's ex-girlfriend. Originally, at one point in the episode, there would be a sequence in which Homer travels to Silicon Valley in the wheel well of a jet. The sequence was based on a news story that the Simpsons writers were "really obsessed with". The episode was one of the first to suggest that Lenny and Carl have an intimate relationship. This revelation garnered scrutiny from the series' fans, who, according to Jean, were "very angry" over it.

"Half-Decent Proposal" was animated in a very complicated manner. In the DVD audio commentary for the episode, director MacMullan stated that a couple of sequences in the episode were "reaching too far" for the animation process to be "reassembled correctly". One example, she mentioned, is the scene in which Marge remembers Ziff's assault from "The Way We Was". Ziff's assault is shown as hands reaching for Marge, and was put together by MacMullan in post-production. Right after Marge's sisters Patty and Selma send an e-mail to Ziff, the e-mail's path is elaborately shown through a "trip through the computer wires". MacMullan stated that, even though she found the scene "illogical", she maintained that it was "done with great effort". Because the characters at Ziff's prom had to wear 1970s styled wardrobe, the animators had to come up with new designs for the character's clothes. Several of the designs were pitched and drawn by Ron Hauge, a former Simpsons writer who was responsible for coordinating character designs on the series for many years. The dance that Ziff performs at the prom was pitched by MacMullan, and the prom locale was drawn using a photo reference. A scene in the episode shows Homer and Lenny signing on to become oil workers. The manager who hands them a paper clip can be seen smoking, and originally, MacMullan suggested that the manager "puts his lit cigarette out in the [oil] can [next to him], and blows his other arm off." She pitched the idea to Jean, who responded by writing "I wouldn't." The episode's complicated and lengthy animation process was so strenuous that it led the Simpsons animators to start calling MacMullan "Lauren MacMultiplane".

"Half-Decent Proposal" features the return of Artie Ziff, and the first time since the season 2 episode "The Way We Was" that he was portrayed by American comedian Jon Lovitz. Even though Ziff appeared in the season 4 episode "The Front" as well, Lovitz was not available during the episode's recording session, and the character was instead voiced by Dan Castellaneta, who is one of the series' main cast members. Jean stated that Lovitz, who has voiced a variety of characters on The Simpsons before, is one of the staff's "favorite guest-stars". The episode also features the first and only appearance of Baron von Kissalot. In the episode, Marge is charged $912 for a taxi drive back to Springfield. She sarcastically tells the taxi driver to send the bill to "Baron von Kissalot", who turns out to be a real person. The character, which was pitched by former show runner David Mirkin and portrayed by Castellaneta, has become one of the writers' favorites and was series animation director Jim Reardon's favorite joke of the entire season. Castellaneta also voiced a couple of the ants who are put on fire at the oil tower. The Simpsons staff debated whether the ants would speak or make any sound at all, with series co-creator Matt Groening being notably hesitant to them being voiced.

== Cultural references ==
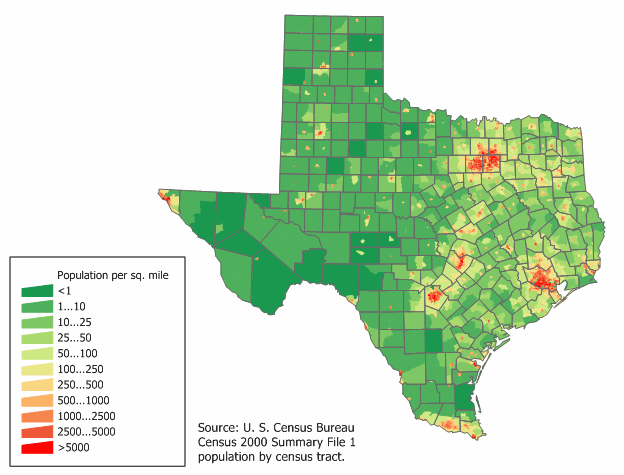
"West Springfield" is based on the American state Texas.

The title, as well as the episode's premise, is based on the 1993 drama film Indecent Proposal and follows the story of the film loosely. The channel BHO is a reference to the real-life television network HBO. Moe's line "He [Artie Ziff] is like a spy in the house Moe" is based on the Anaïs Nin novel A Spy in the House of Love. The ball in Ziff's manor points back to a scene in the season 2 episode "The Way We Was", in which Marge danced with Ziff. Believing that Marge and Ziff will get married, Homer says that he'll "never be born" as a result, a similar problem faced by Marty McFly in Back to the Future. Comic Book Guy has several items of merchandise from the Star Wars franchise in his room, including sheets, pictures and a Jar Jar Binks doll.

During breakfast after Marge has had a sleepless night, she serves a stack of pancakes to Lisa who pulls out of the stack a syrup covered copy of Time magazine with "AOL Rules" on the front cover - a reference to the ill-fated AOL-Time Warner merger that had happened the year before. Nookie in New York, the TV show that Marge watches with her sisters, spoofs the TV series Sex and the City. When Marge leaves with Artie, she sees that Homer has spelled the words "Keep Your Clothes On" as a direct reference to the M*A*S*H series finale, "Goodbye, Farewell and Amen". In the video that Homer recorded for Marge, Homer holds two toys. The one in his left hand is a "Funzo", a fictional toy that first appeared in the season 11 episode "Grift of the Magi". The fictional area of "West Springfield" is modeled after the American state Texas (purposely once again a red-herring to where Springfield is based - it seems to be right next to Texas, until Lisa states that West Springfield is "Three times the size of Texas"). The scene in which Homer and Lenny are travelling to West Springfield is a reference to the last scene in the 1969 drama film Midnight Cowboy. The music heard during the scene is also made to resemble the theme from said film. The scene in which Homer and Lenny are working in an oil rig is a reference to the 1970 film Five Easy Pieces. The song produced by Artie's invention at the end of the episode is Sweet Dreams (Are Made Of This), originally by Eurythmics.

== Release ==
In its original American broadcast on February 10, 2002, "Half-Decent Proposal" received a 7.1 rating, according to Nielsen Media Research, translating to approximately 7.5 million viewers. The episode finished in 36th place in the ratings for the week of February 4–10, 2002. On August 24, 2010, the episode was released part of The Simpsons: The Complete Thirteenth Season DVD and Blu-ray set. Al Jean, Ian Maxtone-Graham, Matt Selman, Tim Long, Dan Castellaneta, Lauren MacMullan, Matt Warburton and James Lipton participated in the audio commentary of the episode.

Six years after the episode's original broadcast, Robert Canning of IGN gave the episode a 9/10, describing it as "amazing". He especially liked Lovitz' performance Artie Ziff, calling it "pitch-perfect" and that one of his favourite lines "stands out" because of Lovitz's "great delivery". Canning also enjoyed the prom scene as well as Lenny and Carl's implied intimate relationship, which he described as "a completely unexpected treat". He summarized the episode as "top-notch" and wrote "The writing was smart and tight, and instead of a B storyline, the half-hour was filled out with a number of great throwaway gags [...] It's true we may have never expected to see Artie Ziff again, but "Half-Decent Proposal" was a welcome and very funny return."

In January 2010, following the conclusion of The Simpsons's twentieth season, IGN chose "Half-Decent Proposal" as the best episode from the thirteenth season, and following the thirteenth season's home video release, reviewer R.L. Shaffer called it one of the season's "gems [...] with good reason".

Both Michael Hikcerson of Slice of SciFi and Rosie Fletcher of Total Film considered "Half-Decent Proposal" to be one of the season's best episodes, with Fletcher calling it a "stand-out".

Casey Broadwater of Blu-ray.com gave it a positive review as well, describing it as a "strong character-centric episode".

People will critique. They'll say: "Oh, you know, you're parodying a movie that's 9 years old." But to me that's actually more interesting than parodying... like doing say an Avatar parody now because everybody's gonna be doing it. Why don't you do something, you know, that's a more interesting story that people may not be familiar with.

— Al Jean, in response to criticism of "Half-Decent Proposal".

However, giving the episode a mixed review, Colin Jacobson of DVD Movie Guide called it "mediocre". Although he praised Lovitz' return as Ziff, and though he did not consider it to be one of the season's worst episodes, Jacobson criticized it for not "hav[ing] a lot of zing".

Ron Martin of 411Mania wrote a negative review, calling it a "yearly episode just with different tempters each time".

Adam Rayner of Obsessed with Film criticized the episode's references to Indecent Proposal, calling it a "rip-off" of the film. Furthermore, he wrote that the episode "manages to be worse [than] that dire movie [Indecent Proposal]."

Nate Boss of Project-Blu also criticized the episode's similarity to Indecent Proposal, calling it "late to the party". He wrote: "Like South Park imitating the WWE in its 13th year, about 12 years past when it hit its prime, The Simpsons makes an Indecent Proposal themed episode." Boss also described the episode as "played out," and criticized it for having "unfunny characters (Artie Ziff), who appear far more often than they should."

In the DVD commentary for the episode, Jean defended The Simpsons' writers' choice to base the episode's story on Indecent Proposal, nine years after the movie was released. He argued that rather than lampooning a current film that will get parodied on other television shows anyway, it is more "interesting" to make an episode based on a story that "people may not be familiar with".
