= A Spy in the House of Love (album) =

Compilation album by The House of Love
- Released: 5 November 1990
- Recorded: 1989–1990
- Genre: Alternative rock
- Length: 51:29
- Label: Fontana

The House of Love chronology
The House of Love (1990)	A Spy in the House of Love (1990)	Babe Rainbow (1992)

Professional ratings
Review scores
Source	Rating
AllMusic	3/5 stars
New Musical Express	5/10

A Spy in the House of Love is a compilation album by the British alternative rock band The House of Love. It was released in late 1990, between the release of the band's second and third albums (Fontana and Babe Rainbow), and compiles various B-sides and other unreleased studio tracks from the period. The B-sides are from the period of the band's second self-titled album.

Like the band itself, the album was named after the 1954 novel by Anaïs Nin.

The track "Marble" was released as a promotional single in the United States.

== Track listing ==
1. "Safe" (B-side of "Never"), 5:44
2. "Marble", 3:23
3. "D Song 89", 3:15
4. "Scratched Inside" (B-side of "Shine On"), 3:04
5. "Phone", 2:53
6. "Cut the Fool Down" (B-side of "The Beatles and the Stones"), 3:11
7. "Ray", 3:37
8. "Love II", 4:43
9. "Baby Teen", 4:39
10. "Love III" (B-side of "Shine On"), 2:21
11. "Soft as Fire" (B-side of "Never"), 4:03
12. "Love IV" (B-side of "The Beatles and the Stones"), 3:06
13. "No Fire", 4:04
14. "Love V" (B-side of "The Beatles and the Stones"), 3:26
