= A Spy in the House of Love =

Book by Anaïs Nin

- First edition (1954)
- Author: Anaïs Nin
- Language: English
- Genre: avant-garde
- Publisher: Swallow Press (1954)
- Publication date: 1954
- Publication place: United States
- Media type: Print (hardback & paperback)
- Pages: 136 pp (first edition)
- Followed by: Seduction of the Minotaur

A Spy in the House of Love is a 1954 novel by Anaïs Nin. Alongside her other novels, Ladders to Fire, Children of the Albatross, The Four-Chambered Heart and Seduction of the Minotaur, it was gathered into a collection known as Cities of the Interior. The novel follows the character of Sabina, a woman who enjoys the sexual licence typically associated with men. Sabina wears extravagant outfits and deliberately avoids romantic commitments. She pursues sexual pleasure in isolation of any other romantic attachment.

== Plot ==
In New York, 1952, Sabina is a thirty-year-old actress married to Alan, a man five years her senior. Alan treats her with a paternal gentleness, calling her “little one”, and provides her with stability and comfort. Although Sabina values his love, she repeatedly lies to him and engages in a series of affairs. She disguises her infidelities behind her acting career, claiming to be away on professional trips while actually meeting her lovers.

Sabina’s first major affair is with Philip, a European opera singer whose good looks and status allow her to feel powerful and envied. She later becomes involved with Mambo, a Black jazz musician, though their relationship is shaped by her fetishization of his body. Constantly fearful of discovery, she lives under the anxiety of being seen with her lovers while maintaining her marriage to Alan.

She then turns to John, a former fighter pilot burdened by guilt from his wartime experiences. Sabina attempts to comfort him, but when he sees her with Alan, she becomes overwhelmed by shame, and John distances himself. Her final relationship is with Donald, a gay man who views her as pure and nurturing. Through their bond, Sabina feels a fleeting sense of redemption and reconnects with qualities she associates with her own mother.

Throughout these encounters, Sabina’s identity becomes increasingly apparent. Each relationship highlights a different aspect of her personality, but none provides lasting fulfillment. She recognizes that she cannot find wholeness either in her affairs or in her marriage. Her constant pursuit of passion only deepens her dissatisfaction, leaving her uncertain whether her divided self is the cause of her infidelities or their result.

The story concludes with Sabina breaking down in tears at her friend Djuna’s apartment. The narration describes her features dissolving, as though her essence itself were disappearing, leaving her search for identity unresolved.

== Reception ==
In a brief review, John L. Bradley referred to the novel as "Tentative, experimental, complex [...] a commendable effort to explore new frontiers of the modern novel."

== Cultural references ==
- The British band The House of Love is named after the novel and later named a compilation album after it.
- In The Simpsons episode "Half-Decent Proposal", Moe Szyslak refers to Artie Ziff by saying, "He's like a spy in the house of Moe."
- The TV series Dollhouse uses the phrase as the title of its ninth episode.
- French fashion designer Olympia Le-Tan creates clutches using covers of classical literature and used A Spy in the House of Love for her latest collection.
- Just Shoot Me episode "A Spy in the House of Me" references the title of the book.

Songs

- Steve Winwood recorded a song called "Spy in the House of Love" in his 1997 album Junction Seven.
- The American band The dB's recorded a song titled "A Spy in the House of Love" on their album Like This.
- The phrase was used as a lyric in The Doors' song "The Spy" on the album Morrison Hotel.
- "Spy in the House of Love" is the title of a song by the band Was (Not Was) released in 1987.
- The band Animal Logic released a single entitled "There's A Spy (in the House of Love)."
- The phrase was used as a lyric in Anaïs Mitchell's song "Namesake" on the album The Brightness.
- Carly Simon quotes a line from the book "I am an international spy in the House of Love", in her 1979 album Spy.
- Ruby Throat reference the title of the book in their song "A Spy in the House of Thieves" on their album The Ventriloquist.
- Lush song "Covert", written by Miki Berenyi, was inspired by the book and ends with the line "I am the spy".

== Adaptation ==
A television series adaptation is in development from Amazon MGM Studios and Legendary Television, with Mr. & Mrs. Smith co-creator Francesca Sloane serving as executive producer.
