= The House of Love (1988 album) =

Studio album by the House of Love
- Released: 16 May 1988
- Genres: Indie rock; post-punk; pop
- Length: 32:10
- Label: Creation
- Producer: The House of Love

The House of Love chronology
The House of Love (1988)	The House of Love (1990)

Singles from The House of Love
- 1. "Christine" Released: May 1988

The House of Love is the debut album by the British alternative rock band the House of Love. Released on 16 May 1988 by Creation Records, the album was a critical success. It appeared in many 1988 critics' lists in NME, Melody Maker and Sounds.

== Background ==
The album was recorded following the departure of founder member Andrea Heukamp, who had played on the band's early singles. Her only appearance on the album was playing guitar and singing backing vocals on the song "Christine" (the first song which group leader Guy Chadwick had written for The House of Love and had inspired the blueprint for the band's original lineup and style). Although the split was amicable, Chadwick would later comment "Losing Andrea Heukamp was a massive, massive blow for me: I loved her voice and I loved her playing, she was easily as important as Pete (Evans), Terry (Bickers) or Chris (Groothuizen)."

Despite the loss of Heukamp, the remaining four members continued with the recording of the debut album. The only single which would make it onto the album was "Christine": surprisingly, neither of the band's first two singles ("Shine On" and "Real Animal") were included. Instead the band drew on other songs which Chadwick had built up. These included "Touch Me", which was the first song that Chadwick had ever written (and which, in 2007, remained his favourite), "Man to Child" (which stemmed from his anxieties about "feeling old at the age of 26") and "Road" (written about his experiences and feelings of alienation on the squatting scene following his move to London from the Midlands). "Love in a Car" was based on "an affair which went on too long" while "Hope" and "Sulphur" drew on Chadwick's failed first marriage (he would describe the songs as "the only positive thing that came out of it.")

Although the recording sessions for the album were completed in just over a week, the mixing sessions - allegedly fuelled by copious use of LSD - proved more problematic, with producer Pat Collier dealing with the final mix after disagreements within the band. The album was preceded by the release of "Christine" as a single in May 1988, which reached No. 1 in the independent charts. The album itself was released later in May. As with the band's previous early singles compilation, the album lacked a title and featured only the band's name on the record sleeve: consequently the album became known simply as The House of Love. A subsequent non-album single, "Destroy The Heart", was eventually voted single of the year in John Peel's Festive Fifty and was added to the end of the next pressing of The House of Love (although it was removed from the 2007 reissue of the album).

In 2007, the reformed House of Love performed the album live in its entirety as part of the All Tomorrow's Parties-curated Don't Look Back series.

== Title confusion ==
The first three long-form House of Love releases, this album, the previous German-market early singles compilation and the band's 1990 album on Fontana Records would all lack an evident title. To avoid confusion, the three untitled releases would be distinguished by informal titles: The German Album (the singles collection, due to its initial release in Germany), the 1988 album remains referred to as The House Of Love or as Creation (regarding the record label), and the 1990 album is often referred to as either Fontana (after the record label it was released on) or The Butterfly Album (after the sleeve art).

== Critical reception ==
Professional ratings
Review scores
Source	Rating
AllMusic	4.5/5 stars
The Guardian	5/5 stars
The Independent	4/5 stars
Mojo	4/5 stars
NME	8/10
Pitchfork	8.2/10
Q	4/5 stars
Record Collector	4/5 stars
Record Mirror	5/5
Uncut	8/10

The Globe and Mail concluded that "the music here is too angular and jarring to go down as straight pop, but it's undeniably catchy and refreshingly intelligent." The Washington Post noted that "though the guitars sometimes take flight, these mostly down-tempo compositions are reclusive by the standards of big 'n' bouncy American pop-rock."

== Track listing ==
All tracks composed by Guy Chadwick.

1. "Christine" - 3:26
2. "Hope" - 2:55
3. "Road" - 3:44
4. "Sulphur" - 3:05
5. "Man to Child" - 2:50
6. "Salome" - 2:30
7. "Love in a Car" - 4:00
8. "Happy" - 2:53
9. "Fisherman's Tale" - 3:45
10. "Touch Me" - 3:02

Later issues would add "Destroy the Heart" as the eleventh track, although this would not feature on the 2007 reissue.

== Personnel ==
- Guy Chadwick - vocals, guitars
- Terry Bickers - lead guitar, backing vocals
- Chris Groothuizen - bass guitar
- Pete Evans - drums

with

- Andrea Heukamp - guitar and backing vocals on "Christine"

== Deluxe reissue ==
In November 2012, Cherry Red reissued House of Love in a deluxe 3-CD package, remastered by Simon Murphy, with liner notes by Guy Chadwick and Alan McGee, and including rare band photos by band photographer, Suzie Gibbons. The package compiles all of the band's recordings while with Creation Records in 1987–88.

=== Disc 1: The House of Love ===
1. "Christine"
2. "Hope"
3. "Road"
4. "Sulphur"
5. "Man to Child"
6. "Salome"
7. "Love in a Car"
8. "Happy"
9. "Fisherman's Tale"
10. "Touch Me"
11. "Shine On" [demo version]
12. "Christine" [demo version]
- All tracks composed by Guy Chadwick.
- Tracks 11 and 12 were released on a 7" bonus disc that accompanied the first 3,000 copies of the album in 1988. Andrea Heukamp appears on these two tracks, in addition to track 1.
- Remastered from original tapes except 11, 12 from vinyl.

=== Disc 2: Singles & B-sides & Rarities ===
1. "Shine On"
2. "Love"
3. "Flow"
4. "Real Animal"
5. "Plastic"
6. "Nothing to Me"
7. "The Hill"
8. "Loneliness Is a Gun"
9. "The Hedonist"
10. "Welt"
11. "Destroy the Heart"
12. "Blind"
13. "Mr Jo"
14. "Destroy the Heart" [demo]
15. "Shine On" [Fuck version]
16. "I Don't Know Why I Love You But I Do" [live]
17. "Love in a Car" [live]
18. "Destroy the Heart" [live]
19. "I Wanna Be Your Dog" [live]
- Tracks 1–3 are from the "Shine On" 12"-single (1987), and 3–6 from the "Real Animal" 12"-single (1987); tracks 7 and 8 are the B-sides from the "Christine" 12"-single (1987). These early singles were first compiled on the German-release, House of Love, known as the German Album (1987, vinyl with 8 tracks; 1988 CD with addition of "Christine" B-sides). Tracks 9 and 10 were first released on the German Album in 1987. Andrea Heukamp appears on these recordings and sings lead vocals on "The Hill". In addition to "Shine On", both "Blind" and "Hedonist" would be re-recorded for the House of Love ("Butterfly") album.
- Tracks 11–13 are the 1988 12"-single, "Destroy the Heart".
- Track 14 was formerly available on the Creation Records compilation American Pensioners on Ecstasy (1991).
- Track 15 was distributed as a free, single-sided flexi disc at House of Love concerts, and later made available on the Creation Records compilation Pensioners on Ecstasy (1990). It is a solo acoustic performance by Guy Chadwick.
- Tracks 16–19 are previously unreleased.
- All tracks remastered from original tapes, except 15.
- All songs written by Chadwick, except "Flow" (by the House of Love), "Mr Jo" (Chadwick and Chris Groothuizen), and the cover of the Stooges' "I Wanna Be Your Dog".

=== Disc 3: Previously Unreleased Mixes & Demos ===
1. "Shine On" [Guy Chadwick solo demo]
2. "Touch Me" [demo 1]
3. "Real Animal" [demo]
4. "Happy" [demo 1]
5. "Hold on Me" [16 track demo]
6. "Christine" [16 track demo]
7. "Modern World" [demo]
8. "Salome" [alternate mix]
9. "Man to Child" [alternate mix]
10. "Hope" [alternate mix]
11. "Love in a Car" [alternate mix]
12. "Touch Me" [alternate mix]
13. "Road" [alternate mix]
14. "Fisherman's Tale" [alternate mix]
15. "Happy" [demo 2]
16. "Sulphur" [alternate mix]
17. "Real Animal" [16 track demo]
18. "Little Girl" [alias Mr Jo]
19. "Shine On" [band demo]
- All tracks on disc 3 are previously unreleased and are remastered from demo cassette tapes.

== Super deluxe reissue ==
A 30th anniversary super deluxe 5-CD edition was released by Cherry Red in September 2018. It features all of the material from the 2012 edition, plus additional demos and alternate versions, John Peel Sessions recorded for BBC Radio, and live tracks. It is packaged in a hardcover book with sleeve notes by NME journalist Neil Taylor and photos by Suzie Gibbons.

=== Disc 1: The House of Love - The Album ===
1. "Christine"
2. "Hope"
3. "Road"
4. "Sulphur"
5. "Man to Child"
6. "Salome"
7. "Love in a Car"
8. "Happy"
9. "Fisherman's Tale"
10. "Touch Me"
11. "Shine On" [demo version]
12. "Christine" [demo version]

=== Disc 2: A-sides, B-sides, Rarities ===
1. "Shine On"
2. "Love"
3. "Flow"
4. "Real Animal"
5. "Plastic"
6. "Nothing to Me"
7. "The Hill"
8. "Loneliness Is a Gun"
9. "The Hedonist"
10. "Welt"
11. "Destroy the Heart"
12. "Blind"
13. "Mr. Jo"
14. "Shine On" [Guy Chadwick demo]
15. "Real Animal" [demo]
16. "Touch Me" [demo]
17. "Happy" [demo]
18. "Road" [early mix]
19. "Salome" [early mix]
20. "Fisherman's Tale" [early mix]
21. "Destroy the Heart" [demo]
22. "Shine On [Fuck version]

=== Disc 3: Demos ===
1. "Road" [longer early mix]
2. "Sulphur" [early mix]
3. "Happy" [early mix]
4. "Fisherman's Tale" [alternative early mix]
5. "Touch Me" [early mix]
6. "Salome" [longer early mix]
7. "Shine On" [band demo]
8. "Real Animal" [16 track demo]
9. "Christine" [16 track demo]
10. "Hold on Me" [16 track demo]
11. "Hope" [alternative version]
12. "Man to Child" [alternative version]
13. "Love in a Car" [alternative version]
14. "Modern World" [demo - alias "Welt"]
15. "Little Girl" [alternative version - alias "Mr. Jo"]
16. "Sulphur" [alternative version]
17. "Happy" [alternative version]
18. "Touch Me" [alternative version]
19. "Shine On" [alternate take]
20. "Real Animal" [alternate take]
21. "Destroy the Heart" [early version - no guitar]

=== Disc 4: BBC Sessions 1988–89 ===
1. "Destroy the Heart"
2. "Nothing to Me"
3. "Plastic"
4. "Blind"
5. "The Hedonist"
6. "Don't Turn Blue"
7. "Safe"
8. "Love in a Car"
9. "In a Room"
10. "The Beatles and the Stones"
11. "Christine"
12. "Loneliness Is a Gun"

=== Disc 5: Live ===
1. "Christine"
2. "Man to Child"
3. "Road"
4. "Shine On"
5. "Plastic"
6. "Sulphur"
7. "Touch Me"
8. "Nothing to Me"
9. "I Don't Know Why I Love You But I Do"
10. "Never"
11. "Se Dest"
12. "The Hedonist"
13. "Soft as Fire"
14. "Fisherman's Tale"
15. "Happy"
16. "Love in a Car"
17. "Destroy the Heart"
18. "I Wanna Be Your Dog"
- Tracks 1–4 - Vredenburg, Utrecht, Holland
- Tracks 5–9 - Groningen, Holland
- Tracks 10–13 - Top Rank, Brighton, England
- Tracks 14–18 - La Cigale, Paris, France
