= She Paints Words in Red =

Studio album by The House of Love
- Released: 9 April 2013
- Studio: Perry Vale Studios, Forest Hill, London
- Genre: Indie rock, indie pop
- Length: 39:12
- Label: Cherry Red
- Producer: Pat Collier, The House of Love

The House of Love chronology
Days Run Away (2005)	She Paints Words in Red (2013)	A State of Grace (2022)

Singles from She Paints Words in Red
- 1. "A Baby Got Back on Its Feet" Released: 18 March 2013

Professional ratings
Aggregate scores
Source	Rating
Metacritic	69/100
Review scores
Source	Rating
Allmusic	4/5 stars
MusicOMH	3.5/5 stars
PopMatters	6/10

She Paints Words in Red is the sixth studio album by English indie rock band The House of Love. It was released in April 2013 under Cherry Red Records. It was their only album released between 2005 and 2022.

== Track listing ==
No.	Title	Length
1.	"A Baby Got Back on Its Feet"	2:48
2.	"Hemingway"	3:30
3.	"She Paints Words in Red"	3:32
4.	"PKR"	2:46
5.	"Lost in the Blues"	3:25
6.	"Low Black Clouds"	2:44
7.	"Money Man"	3:05
8.	"Trouble in Mind"	3:11
9.	"Never Again"	3:09
10.	"Sunshine Out of the Rain"	3:56
11.	"Holy River"	3:56
12.	"Eye Dream"	3:10

== Personnel ==
The House of Love

- Guy Chadwick - vocals, guitar
- Terry Bickers - guitar, vocals
- Matt Jury - bass
- Peter Evans - drums

Technical

- Julian Tardo - engineer
- Andy Smith - cover layout
- Suzie Gibbons - photography
