= Terry Bickers =

English musician

- Born: Terence Robert Arthur Bickers; 6 September 1965 (age 61); Kensington, London, England
- Genres: Alternative rock, psychedelic rock, progressive rock
- Occupations: Musician, songwriter, producer
- Instruments: Guitars, vocals, bass, keyboards, drums
- Years active: 1985–present

Terence "Terry" Robert Arthur Bickers (born 6 September 1965 in Kensington, London) is an English musician and songwriter. A guitarist and singer, he is best known for his work as the original lead guitarist with the House of Love (from 1986 to 1989 and again from 2004 to 2020) and as the former frontman/guitarist for Levitation and Cradle. During the late 1980s and 1990s Bickers was hailed as one of Britain's leading young guitarists, as well as attracting plenty of press coverage due to his unconventional pronouncements.

Bickers's most recent work has been with singer-songwriter Pete Fijalkowski, with whom he released the album Broken Heart Surgery in July 2014. He is currently based in Brighton, England where he teaches music.

== Biography and musical career ==
=== Early years ===
Terry Bickers was born in Kensington, London, and grew up in nearby Fulham, initially learning bass guitar and then progressing to electric guitar, playing gigs in local pubs from aged 15.

Bickers's first significant band was the Northern Irish indie-rock band Colenso Parade, which he joined in 1985 on their move to London. He played on their Hallelujah Chorus EP and Glentoran album, both released in 1986 on Fire Records.

=== The House of Love ===
In 1986 Bickers left Colenso Parade to join the House of Love, playing the role of lead guitarist and creative foil to singer and songwriter Guy Chadwick. The House of Love rapidly gained critical acclaim in the British weekly music press (much of it focused on Bickers' intense psychedelic guitar approach). The band's 1988 debut album – also called The House of Love, and released on Creation Records – received glowing reviews and saw the Chadwick/Bickers partnership being compared to the Smiths partnership of Morrissey and Johnny Marr. Hotly tipped as being future stars, the band soon moved on to the major label Fontana and came under pressure to write more commercial singles.

Although Bickers remained an acclaimed guitarist he had difficulty adjusting both to his musical celebrity and the demands of the record industry. During the peak of the House of Love's commercial success lifestyle and ill health (chronic fatigue syndrome) led to Bickers having difficulty keeping up with band commitments and subsequently he had a breakdown. Bickers' relationship with Chadwick had also become increasingly strained over time and he was ejected from the band in 1989 after a major falling out (although his playing would feature on the band's second album, released the following year).

After leaving the band, Bickers sought greater stability, choosing to marry and have a daughter, Ella, in 1990.

=== Levitation ===
In 1990, Bickers formed the psychedelic rock band Levitation with drummer David Francolini, former Cardiacs guitarist Bic Hayes, multi-instrumentalist Robert White (later of The Milk and Honey Band) and bass player Joe Allen (who went on to join Strangelove and was replaced by Laurence O'Keefe). As well as playing guitar, Bickers took on the role of lead singer in the band. The band quickly became known for their intense collective playing, and were hailed in both the underground and mainstream music press as new psychedelic heroes as well as potential rehabilitators of progressive rock. Levitation recorded a number of EPs (including the Coppelia EP, heralded by Melody Maker as "this generation's Marquee Moon,") and two albums – Coterie and Need For Not.

With Bickers already notorious for his time with House of Love, Levitation gained a good deal of press attention very quickly. Despite the band's collective approach (and Bickers' insistence that Levitation was a democracy), much of this attention was focussed on the eminently quotable Bickers himself. In interviews with the music press, Bickers would provide career-friendly quotes by, for example, citing an interest in the then-current dance and rave music scenes as well as the indie-rock and psychedelic music movements. However, he was equally likely to suggest that Levitation were considering performing in masks or carrying out a concert tour of Britain via canal, or to raise esoteric ideas such as Gaia theory or the possibilities of communicating with dolphins. Although reviewers continued to praise his skill as a musician, his schemes and philosophical ideas (though presented with sincerity) led to him being mocked and caricatured for his apparent eccentricity, leading to his reputation and nickname as "Bonkers Bickers".

Despite rave reviews and an excellent reputation as a live band, plus a growing fanbase, the band's career was set back by Bickers' refusal to tour America following an incident on the band's first American tour in which some of the band were caught in crossfire during a gun battle between police and a criminal gang. This led to tension between Bickers and the other members, culminating in Bickers departing the band, acrimoniously, in 1993. Bickers famously quit Levitation onstage during a London concert, announcing "We've lost it, haven't we?" Bic Hayes would later comment "It had happened a few times before that last gig but I think that we all knew very early on at (that) one that there was no going back again."

Years later, Bickers would speak about his departure with regret and shame, but in his defence claim that he had been unhappy with the band's musical direction and wanted to spend more time with his family. Since this time Bickers has committed to a clean and healthy living lifestyle. In 2018 he amicably reunited onstage with his former Levitation bandmate Bic Hayes, when he guested for the first time with the latter's psychedelic band ZOFFF.

=== Paradise Estate, Cradle, Monkey 7 and others ===
After leaving Levitation in 1993, Bickers teamed up with guitarist Clive Giblin (Alternative TV, Shock Headed Peters, Two Worlds Collide, Sol Invictus). The duo formed a band called Paradise Estate, named after the Television Personalities' track as they were both fans. They spent about six weeks writing and recording the songs that would convince Warner Bros to sign Bickers, following which the pair drifted apart (with Giblin leaving the band).

Bickers renamed the project Cradle and drafted in former King Kurt and Dave Howard Singers drummer T. Daniel Howard. This line up – together with Bickers' partner, singer Caroline Tree – spent the summer of 1994 locked away in a studio in Lincolnshire recording an album for Warner Bros subsidiary label Blanco Y Negro. The result was an album and single, neither of which were released (although some copies of the single were pressed and reviewed in the music press). Around this time Giblin departed, and not long after Warner Bros dropped the band.

Moving to Rye in Sussex, Bickers put together a third line-up of Cradle with himself on guitar, vocals, and various instruments, Caroline Tree as co-lead singer (and main creative foil) and Ian Mundwyler on guitar, plus a floating cast of contributing musicians. Recording sessions for this project were more successful and Cradle released what would be their only completed album, Baba Yaga, in 1995. This displayed a divided approach, alternating distinctly between noisy indie rock songs (predominantly sung by Tree) and ghostly psychedelic material (predominantly sung by Bickers) which showed a much softer approach than either Levitation or The House of Love. (During this period, Bickers also played on Divan, the 1995 debut album by Oedipussy, a project headed by former The Perfect Disaster member Phil Parfitt).

In contrast to the reception afforded to Bickers' two previous bands, the press received Cradle with indifference or even contempt, with Caroline Tree being labelled as "the worst singer in the world" in a review in New Musical Express. Tree left the band shortly afterwards. Despite playing a few concerts with Bickers as lead vocalist, and more or less ditching the more conventional indie rock approaches in favour of dark psychedelia, Cradle did not last for much longer and quietly dissolved in 1996.

Bickers went on to work in production, resurfacing briefly in 1999 with a new band called Monkey 7 (also featuring Sam Smith and Nik Webb). In contrast to the serious intent of Bickers' previous bands, Monkey 7 were described as "Tony Bennett steaming headfirst into the last working remnants of Shaun Ryder" and "a lo-fi ska Blur playing for laffs." The band released one single, "The Snowy Peaks/It All Comes Back on You", on Anvil Recording Co. in 2001.

=== Return to the House of Love ===
In 2002, the House of Love's former agent Mick Griffiths suggested that Bickers and Guy Chadwick meet to discuss the possibility of working together again, which they did and were reconciled. This in turn led the reformation of The House of Love in 2003 with original drummer Pete Evans and new bassist Matt Jury.

At the start of 2005 the reunited band released their first post-reformation album, Days Run Away; eight years later another album, She Paints Words in Red was released in the spring of 2013. In between and afterwards, the band toured intermittently. Bickers would continue as a member of The House of Love until 2020, when Chadwick put together an entirely different line-up to tour the United States.

=== Pete Fij / Terry Bickers ===
In 2009, Bickers joined up with Worthing resident Pete Fijalkowski (ex Adorable/Polak) for a new "stripped down" project. The pair began writing together as a duo (with Fijalkowski on vocals and acoustic guitar and Bickers on electric guitar), playing a few low-key concerts in early 2010. After a Kickerstarter campaign at the end of 2013, the pair self-released their debut album Broken Heart Surgery to critical acclaim in July 2014. They followed with a 2nd album, "We are Millionaires" in 2017 on Broadcast Records.

=== Terry Bickers & the Inner Spiral ===
In October 2024, Bickers announced the formation of a new band, Terry Bickers & the Inner Spiral. In addition to Bickers, the band features two former House of Love members, Pete Evans and Matt Jury (who were both in the final House of Love line-up featuring Bickers between 2003 and 2020) and keyboard/guitar player Dan Burke (Astrid Williamson, the Milk And Honey Band). Two concerts were announced for Brighton and Hastings in early November 2024.

=== Other collaborations ===
Bickers' guitar playing features on Les Nouvelles Polyphonies Corses, a recording of Corsican polyphonic singing, and on some Heidi Berry recordings.

=== Shintaido ===
Since 1998 Bickers has been a practitioner of the martial art Shintaido, which originated in Japan.

== Selected discography ==
=== with Colenso Parade ===
- Hallelujah Chorus EP, Fire Records, 1986
- Glentoran album, Fire Records, 1986

=== with the House of Love ===
- The House of Love (a.k.a. The German Album), Rough Trade Records/Creation Records, 1987 (reissued by Renascent Records, 2007) (early singles collection, initially only released in Germany)
- The House of Love album, Creation Records, 1988
- The House of Love (a.k.a. Fontana) album, Fontana Records, 1990
- Days Run Away album, Art & Industry, 2005
- She Paints Words in Red album, Cherry Red Records, 2013

=== with Levitation ===
- Coppelia EP, Ultimate Records, 1991
- After Ever EP, Ultimate Records, 1991
- Coterie compilation album, Capitol Records, 1991/Ultimate Records, 1992
- World Around EP, Ultimate Records, 1992
- Need For Not album, Rough Trade Records, 1992
- Even When Your Eyes Are Open EP, Capitol Records, 1994
- Meanwhile Gardens album, Festival Records, 1994 (When Bickers left the band in 1993, his contributions to this already completed album were largely removed and his lead vocals were replaced by those of Steve Ludwin but some of his guitar playing and backing vocals remained on the record that was issued.)
- Meanwhile Gardens album, Flashback Records, 2015 (The original version as completed before Bickers left the band)
- Never Odd Or Even EP, Flashback Records, 2015 (3 more tracks from the Meanwhile Gardens sessions)

=== with Cradle ===
- Baba Yaga album, Ultimate Records, 1995

=== with Monkey 7 ===
- The Snowy Peaks/It All Comes Back on You single, Anvil Recording Co., 2001

=== with Pete Fij / Terry Bickers ===
- Broken Heart Surgery Broadcast, 2014
- We Are Millionaires Broadcast, 2017
