= The House of Love =

English alternative rock band

- The House of Love, 1988 – from left to right: Pete Evans, Chris Groothuizen, Guy Chadwick, Terry Bickers

Background information
- Origin: London, England
- Genres: Alternative rock; indie rock; neo-psychedelia; noise pop
- Years active: 1986–1993; 2003–present
- Labels: Creation; Fontana; PolyGram; Spectrum; Strange Fruit; Art & Industry; Cherry Red
- Members: Guy Chadwick; Keith Osborne; Harry Osborne; Hugo Degenhardt
- Past members: Terry Bickers; Chris Groothuizen; Andrea Heukamp; Simon Mawby; Simon Walker; Pete Evans; Matt Jury
- Website: Official website

The House of Love are an English alternative rock band, formed in London in 1986 by singer-songwriter-guitarist Guy Chadwick and co-founder and lead guitarist Terry Bickers. They rose to prominence in 1987 with their first single "Shine On", released on the independent label Creation. The following year, the band released their critically acclaimed eponymous debut album and built their reputation over the next few years through subsequent releases, constant touring and the support of the English press. They signed with Fontana Records in 1989 and met commercial success in 1990 with their second self-titled album, which peaked at number 8 in the UK albums chart. Their third album, Babe Rainbow, was favourably met by the critics in 1992 and also reached the top 40 in the UK.

The House of Love are best known for their detailed psychedelic guitar sound and for other singles such as "Christine" and "Destroy the Heart". In the US, the songs "I Don't Know Why I Love You", "Marble" and "You Don't Understand" were also popular on alternative rock radio stations, respectively reaching number two, number five and number nine on the Billboard Modern Rock chart. The House of Love disbanded in 1993. After a hiatus of 10 years, they reformed in 2003 with Bickers, who had performed on their two first albums. They have been cited as an influence by shoegaze bands Slowdive and Ride.

In 2020, Chadwick announced a change of line-up and that he had recruited a new band.

== History ==
=== Formation and debut album (1986–1989) ===
The House of Love were formed in 1986 in Camberwell, London, by former Kingdoms singer and guitarist Guy Chadwick: he had been inspired to start a new band after seeing the Jesus and Mary Chain in concert at London's Electric Ballroom. He wrote a new song called "Christine", which gave him ideas for progress: "The idea of the sound of the group and what kind of musicians to look for... female vocals... a good take on the Velvets' sonics... and of course the image." Chadwick teamed up with an old friend, drummer Pete Evans, and recruited the rest of the initial House of Love lineup via an advert in Melody Maker. This brought together an international band of London-born lead guitarist Terry Bickers (ex-Colenso Parade), described as "a genius guitar player," by Creation Records' Alan McGee, German rhythm guitarist/co-singer Andrea Heukamp and her bass guitarist boyfriend Chris Groothuizen (from New Zealand). Chadwick opted to name his new band The House of Love after Anaïs Nin's book A Spy in the House of Love. There was a considerable age differential in the band: Chadwick, by now aged 30, was nearly ten years older than Terry Bickers.

Signing to Creation Records, The House of Love released their debut single "Shine On" in May 1987 and toured with Felt and Zodiac Mindwarp. During the latter half of 1987, the band continued to tour: a third on the bill placing at a concert at the Town & Country Club was widely acclaimed in the press and convinced Creation Records to make a record with them. The resulting single, "Christine", was not released until mid-1988, and was the last of the band's recordings to feature Andrea Heukamp as a full member. Having become tired of touring, Heukamp quit the band at the end of 1987 and returned to her home region of Münsterland.

Although the split was amicable, Chadwick would later comment "Losing Andrea Heukamp was a massive, massive blow for me: I loved her voice and I loved her playing, she was easily as important as Pete, Terry or Chris." Heukamp appeared in the group shot used for the cover of the band's first long-form release, a 1987 Germany-only compilation of the early recordings, eight songs of which she had played on. This record was untitled apart from the band name and was consequently just known as The House of Love or informally as The German Album. Heukamp's split from The House of Love would not be absolute, as she would return as a studio guest on some of the band's subsequent albums.

Following Heukamp's departure, The House of Love began working on their debut album. The recording sessions were completed in just over a week, but the mixing sessions, allegedly fuelled by copious use of LSD, proved more problematic, with producer Pat Collier dealing with the final mix after disagreements within the band. The album was preceded by the release of "Christine" as a single in May 1988, which reached No. 1 in the independent charts. Later in May, the debut album was released. As with The German Album, the album lacked a formal title anywhere on the sleeve, and therefore became generally known as The House of Love. A stand-alone single, "Destroy The Heart", was eventually voted single of the year in DJ John Peel's Festive Fifty.

Following the success of the first album which topped the indie charts in Europe, the band opted to sign to Fontana Records (and PolyGram in the US), with Creation label head Alan McGee continuing for a while as manager. Ominously, by this time the band's drug use had begun to escalate as had internal problems with egos and dissension.

The first House of Love release on the Fontana label was the single "Never", which was issued against the band's wishes, and stalled just outside the Top 40. During summer 1989, The House of Love played a week-long residency at the I.C.A. in London, varying their sets and featuring support bands as diverse as Pere Ubu, Stone Roses and the Rainbirds.

The recording and mixing of the band's next album (and first for Fontana) was beset with problems. The band members were distracted by hedonism, ego and indecision, going through four different producers and multiple studios. The stress of Fontana's commercial expectations were also playing a part. In 2005, Chadwick recollected that "the guy who signed us (Dave Bates) had signed Def Leppard and Tears for Fears so he had a lot of clout. He insisted on putting us together with producers who were quite obviously wrong for us. He was completely uninterested in anything that didn't have a huge chorus in it. He wanted hits, basically. He also ordered a load of remixes that we hadn't authorised and we absolutely loathed."

We really needed guidance at that crucial point. Most groups just go nuts. It's like this huge trolley full of booze being placed in front of you. With a whiff of success, people change towards you. We were taking too many drugs, I was drinking ridiculously and that's the worst combination when things are going wrong.

— Guy Chadwick on the Fontana years

Much later, Chadwick was to regard signing with Fontana as the worst mistake in the band's career. At the time, Terry Bickers was of this opinion already. Having always been unhappy with the implications of the Fontana deal, and now feeling justified in his fears, he began to retreat into anxiety and drugs, eventually succumbing to manic depression. By this time, Chadwick's own responsibilities and external pressures, fuelled by his growing drug and alcohol habit, would turn him into what he would later describe as "(a) monster. A nice monster, sometimes, but a monster none the less." Before much longer, Chadwick and Bickers were no longer talking to each other.

The next House of Love single, "I Don't Know Why I Love You", was released in October 1989 but stalled at number 41 in the charts despite being Radio 1's Single of the Week. A sixty-plus date UK tour was set for the end of the year, with an important press covering and public attention, but this would prove to be the last straw for the band's initial lineup. In 2005 Bickers recollected "After our first album it was manic. A classic case of too much too soon. We needed a break... We had spent eighteen months in the studio recording our second album. Everything we produced got rejected and we were at the end of our ropes. Then as soon as we got the last track down they said 'Right, now off you go on tour'. It was a recipe for disaster."

=== Second self-titled album and departure of Terry Bickers (1989–1990) ===
During the tour, the increasingly difficult relationship between Chadwick and Bickers worsened and Bickers was abruptly sacked mid-tour. At one day's notice, Simon Walker was recruited directly from My White Bedroom and the Dave Howard Singers as replacement lead guitarist. He made his debut at the band's concert at Portsmouth Polytechnic on 4 December 1989.

Initially, the band claimed that Bickers was taking a break due to exhaustion. It soon became clear that the break was permanent, having followed a notorious incident inside the House of Love's tour van when Bickers had begun chanting "Breadhead!" at Chadwick while setting fire to the band's money in a protest against what he saw as the band's increasing commercialisation and materialism. Looking back on the incident two years later, Bickers confessed "That was frustration. I just found at the time that I didn't have the same aspirations as the rest of the band. I was more into exploring music than exploring the exploitation of markets around the globe. They were really into crusading. And winning. I wasn't."

Bickers would go on to form the psychedelic rock band Levitation and for some time, he and Chadwick would continue to spar via the music press. At one point, Chadwick claimed that despite Bickers' stellar reputation as a player it was in fact he himself who had played "90 per cent" of the guitars on the band's recordings (a claim that he later withdrew). Bickers in turn described Chadwick as "a megalomaniac." In spite of the feud, over a decade later Chadwick would confess that he had soon come to want Bickers to return to The House of Love but had failed to actually communicate this to Bickers himself.

The House of Love's second album (also untitled, but generally known as either House of Love, the Butterfly album, or simply Fontana) was released in January 1990; it reached the top ten in the UK Albums Chart and peaked at No. 148 in the Billboard Top 200, staying in the US chart for 8 weeks. It sold worldwide over 400,000 copies. "I Don't Know Why I Love You" was heavily played on US alternative rock radios: it reached number 2 on the Modern Rock Tracks chart in March. In the UK, the album had been preceded by a newly recorded version of the band's first single, "Shine On": released in seven different formats, the song saw them break into the top 20.

The House of Love continued and completed their tour with Simon Walker now firmly settled in as guitarist. The last date of the tour was a sold-out concert at the Royal Albert Hall. This was the band's commercial peak. A fourth single from the Fontana album – "The Beatles and the Stones" – reached the top 40 of the singles chart in March 1990. The House of Love continued to tour in both America and Europe, with former member Andrea Heukamp returning to the band later in the year to add backing vocals.

A second compilation album called A Spy in the House of Love was released in late 1990, consisting of older scrapped material and a sampling of the band's large backlog of b-sides. A stopgap measure to keep up the band's momentum, it failed to match the sales of Fontana (although a promo single, "Marble", reached number 5 in the U.S. Modern Rock charts).

In early 1991, they undertook a 10 date French tour which peaked at the Olympia in Paris; the concert was broadcast live in prime time on radio France Inter. On 31 August, they decided to perform three London concerts on the same night – the first at the University of London Union in Bloomsbury, the second at the Town & Country Club in Kentish Town and the third at The Boston Arms in Tufnell Park. Despite the publicity stunt nature of the evening, the band received good reviews and it was considered that their challenge had paid off. Evans, Walker and Groothuizen then took advantage of the time off to return to My White Bedroom, which released its lone album after two years of delay.

=== Babe Rainbow (1991–1992) ===
The delay proved costly for The House of Love, as it ensured that the band lost momentum. It also coincided with the rise of grunge in the United States and the arrival of The Stone Roses on the British music scene, both of which rapidly consumed the attention of the British music press and rock reviewers. In October 1991, The House of Love returned with a new single "The Girl With the Loneliest Eyes". Although this was hailed in the press as another piece of beautiful pop by the band, it failed to chart (amid accusations of record company distribution incompetence). Also that year, the band contributed a cover of "Who by Fire" to the Leonard Cohen tribute album I'm Your Fan.

Follow-up recording sessions for their third album were scheduled over a period of six months: former member Andrea Heukamp guested on the studio sessions to add extra guitar and backing vocals. Two other singles followed: "Feel" released in April 1992 and "You Don't Understand" which preceded Babe Rainbow. Simon Walker left the group over musical differences at that time and was replaced as guitarist by former Woodentops member Simon Mawby.

Released in July, Babe Rainbow was a critical success in the UK, but only sold respectably (peaking at number 34 on the UK Album Chart). In the US, "You Don't Understand" became a hit on the alternative radio, reaching number 9 on the Billboard Modern Rock chart.

During 1992, the band attempted to reverse their fortunes with more hard touring (travelling as part of a triple bill with Ocean Colour Scene and Catherine Wheel, but while the band were still greeted with respect this did not translate into the desired sales. Simon Mawby left the band at the end of the year, once again leaving Chadwick without a lead guitar foil. A fourth single taken from the album, "Crush Me", was the band's lowest-placing single release on Fontana, peaking at number 67 in the UK.

=== Audience with the Mind and split (1993) ===
The House of Love began work on their fourth album in January 1993. In contrast to previous efforts it was recorded in under two weeks, with Chadwick playing all of the guitar parts and with Groothuizen and Evans contributing (for the first time) to songwriting. As with Babe Rainbow, Andrea Heukamp made a guest appearance (this time, only on backing vocals). The band laid plans to record their fifth album later in the year, following a tour of France. However, on their return to London Pete Evans announced to the band that he wanted to retire from the music business.

Uncertain of how to proceed, The House of Love kept Evans' departure under wraps while Chadwick concentrated on promoting the new album, Audience with the Mind, by himself. The album was released in June 1993 and scraped into the top 40 of the album chart, only remaining in the chart for one week. It showed no sign of reversing the band's commercial decline and no singles from the album were released. Without a drummer, with a group reduced to only two members and a vanishing commercial profile, Chadwick admitted defeat later in the year and disbanded The House of Love.

=== Post break-up (1994–2003) ===
By his own admission, some years after the event, Chadwick took the split of The House of Love very badly and succumbed to depression: "It was very hard to get out of bed. I was ill. After the group finished it was such a huge awakening. I just cracked up, and couldn't function for years." Ironically, Chadwick's battles with depression enabled him to better understand why Terry Bickers had left the band, and would eventually lead to a reconciliation between the two. Despite his difficulties, he made more attempts at a musical career, going on to form The Madonnas in 1994 (splitting the band in 1995) and subsequently the similarly short-lived, Belgium-based Eyedreams in 1996. Neither bands would release any records. He resurfaced as a solo artist in 1997, releasing one album, 1998's Lazy Soft and Slow produced by Cocteau Twins' Robin Guthrie.

Despite Evans' claims of having retired from music, both he and Chris Groothuizen continued for three more years with My White Bedroom. Groothuizen would subsequently coproduce and engineer the debut album for British chansonnier Simon Warner in 1996 before taking on a new career as an architect and lecturer. From 1994 onwards, Evans began an ongoing collaboration as producer and musician with teenaged singer-songwriter Cat Goscovitch. He contributing heavily to her projects Billy Rain (1994) and Nut (1996) as drummer, guitarist and co-songwriter, and returned as one of her key collaborators in 2010.

Terry Bickers stayed with Levitation for two albums before acrimoniously quitting the band onstage in 1993. He went on to form another short-lived space rock band, Cradle, and was involved briefly with other projects during the late 1990s, but never returned to the prominence or consistent work he had enjoyed with The House of Love and Levitation. In the early 2000s, he re-established contact with Guy Chadwick.

Various re-releases and compilations kept the band in the public eye, including 1998's Best of The House of Love and 2000's The John Peel Sessions 88–89. In 2001, PLR reissued the entire set of recordings which the band had made during their most critically acclaimed period (on Creation Records) with the release of 1986–88: The Creation Recordings. In 2004, The Fontana Years was released, covering the turbulent period of the second album.

=== Reformation and Days Run Away (2003–2011) ===
In 2003, the reconciled Chadwick and Bickers reformed the House of Love at the urging of former agent Mick Griffiths. The duo also re-recruited Pete Evans as drummer. Although Chris Groothuizen was invited to re-join and thus reform the "classic" band line-up, he amicably declined, opting instead to remain in his architectural career. His place as bass guitarist was taken by Matt Jury. In 2005, the band went on to tour throughout the UK, Ireland and Sweden, and released a comeback album, Days Run Away, on the Art & Industry label; it received some praise from critics.

Bickers and Chadwick seemed confident that age, perspective and situation meant that they could avoid the problems which had divided the band in 1990. Interviewed at the time of the release of Days Run Away, Chadwick admitted acceptance of the fact that "we're really different people. It's a very complex kind of friendship, and I think it'll always be slightly fractious. We don't have this huge buddy thing going on though at the same time it's very intimate... We've always had a very instinctive way of communicating with each other, which I guess is why we make good music together." Bickers in turn reflected "I think we're both old enough and ugly enough to address any issues head-on and keep our tempers in check. We're also doing things at our own pace rather than letting a record company dictate what we do, which helps... It's still early days but communication is good and so is the music. This is about letting bygones be bygones and just getting on with it. Personally, I've never been happier."

The House of Love (the band's 1988 debut album) was reissued on CD in 2007. This led to the band being invited to play the album live in its entirety as part of the Don't Look Back concert series. In 2009, Live at the BBC featured selections from the band's post-Bickers in concert recordings from 1990 to 1992. In November 2012, Cherry Red announced the release of a 3-CD deluxe edition of their debut self-titled album, adding all the remaining Creation recordings and a disc of unissued demos and alternative versions.

=== She Paints Words in Red and more touring (2012–2019) ===
In December 2012, The House of Love Official Facebook page confirmed that the band had recently completed a new studio album. The album was recorded with original members Chadwick, Bickers, Evans accompanied by bassist Matt Jury. In early 2013 the title was revealed as She Paints Words in Red; it was released in March by Cherry Red Records. The band toured intermittently over the following years, including two night at the Lexington in 2013 which were recorded for a live album and DVD.

In 2018, to celebrate the 30th anniversary of their debut album, the band embarked on a six date British tour in autumn, peaking with a packed headline show at the Roundhouse in London in November where they played the album in full, though accidentally missed out one track.

=== More line-up changes (2020–present) ===
In 2020, Chadwick announced a new line-up for planned concert dates in the United States, with Keith Osborne (lead guitar, formerly of The Past Present Organization, Idlewild, Helicopter Girl and Reuben's Train), Harry Osborne (bass guitar, also of Someone Anyone) and Hugo Degenhardt (drums, previous work with Bryan Ferry, Rod Stewart and Steve Hackett). After Chadwick spoke of a new album in 2021, the first in 9 years, A State Of Grace was released on 16 September 2022. A UK tour was organised in September with eleven dates across the country, followed by the rescheduled 30th Anniversary Tour in North America in October.

On 7 October 2022, it was announced in Traueranzeigen im Munsterland that former House of Love band member Andrea Heukamp had died in Münster at the age of 57. Since her departure from the band, Heukamp had been living "a secluded life" away from the music business, although she had also contributed backing vocals to a Münster-based band called Loving the Sun.

== Discography ==
=== Studio albums ===
List of albums, with selected chart positions
Title	Album details	Peak chart positions	
Title	Album details	UK	AUS
The House of Love	Released: May 1988; Label: Creation	—	—
The House of Love / Fontana or The Butterfly Album	Released: February 1990; Label: Fontana	8	134
Babe Rainbow	Released: July 1992; Label: Fontana	34	—
Audience with the Mind	Released: June 1993; Label: Fontana	38	—
Days Run Away	Released: 2005; Label: Art & Industry	189	—
She Paints Words in Red	Released: 2013; Label: Cherry Red	159	—
A State of Grace	Released: 2022; Label: Cherry Red	—	—

=== Live albums ===
- Live at the Lexington 13:11:13 (2014)

=== Charting compilations ===
List of charting compilation albums, with selected chart positions
Title	Album details	Peak chart positions
Title	Album details	UK
A Spy in the House of Love	Released: 1990; Label: Fontana	49

=== Singles ===
Year	Title	UK	AUS	IRE	NED	US Alt	Album
1987	"Shine On"	—	—	—	—	—	Non-album singles
1987	"Real Animal"	—	—	—	—	—	Non-album singles
1988	"Christine"	187	—	—	—	8	The House of Love
1988	"Destroy the Heart"	76	—	—	—	—	Non-album single
1989	"Never"	41	165	—	—	—	The House of Love
1989	"I Don't Know Why I Love You"	41	—	—	—	2	The House of Love
1990	"Shine On" (new version)	20	171	24	—	—	The House of Love
1990	"Beatles and the Stones"	36	—	26	50	—	The House of Love
1991	"Marble" (US promo only)	—	—	—	—	5	A Spy in the House of Love
1991	"The Girl with the Loneliest Eyes"	58	—	—	—	—	Babe Rainbow
1992	"Feel"	45	—	—	—	—	Babe Rainbow
1992	"You Don't Understand"	46	—	—	—	9	Babe Rainbow
1992	"Crush Me"	67	—	—	—	—	Babe Rainbow
1993	"Hollow"	—	—	—	—	—	Audience with the Mind
2005	"Love You Too Much"	73	—	—	—	—	Days Run Away
2005	"Gotta Be That Way"	112	—	—	—	—	Days Run Away
2013	"A Baby Got Back on Its Feet"	—	—	—	—	—	She Paints Words in Red
"—" denotes releases that did not chart or were not released.
