= Pete Fijalkowski =

English musician

- Also known as: Piotr Fijalkowski, Pete Fij
- Born: Peter Jeremy Fijalkowski; 11 December 1968 (age 57); Surrey, England
- Genre: Alternative rock
- Occupations: Musician, songwriter
- Instruments: Vocals, guitar
- Years active: 1988–present
- Labels: Creation, One Little Indian
- Website: petefijterrybickers.blogspot.com

Peter Jeremy Fijalkowski (born 11 December 1968 in Surrey) is an English vocalist, guitarist and songwriter formerly with the bands Adorable and Polak, and with Terry Bickers of the House of Love in the duo Pete Fij / Terry Bickers. Polak also featured his brother, Krzyz Fijalkowski (born Christopher Martin Fijalkowski 1962 in Surrey), formerly of The Bardots.

He has used variants of his name in the different projects he has worked on – using the Polish spelling of his birth name Peter, Piotr Fijalkowski in Adorable and the shortened Pete Fij for his work with Terry Bickers.

A film studies graduate at Warwick University, Fijalkowski is the director of the 'On Location Film Festival' in Worthing, which shows films in site-specific locations relevant to the film. He is also the director of Pete Fij / Terry Bickers' videos for "Out of Time", "Downsizing" and "Betty Ford".

After a Kickstarter in late 2013 Fij and Terry Bickers released their debut album Broken Heart Surgery in July 2014. Their second album, We Are Millionaires, was released in July 2017.

He is now releasing music as a solo artist as Pete Fij on Tip Top Recordings. The single 'Love's Coming Back' was released in November 2025 and is followed by 'Cuckoo', slated for release on 10 February 2026. His debut solo album, 'Up's The New Down', was released on 10 July 2026.
