= Guy Chadwick =

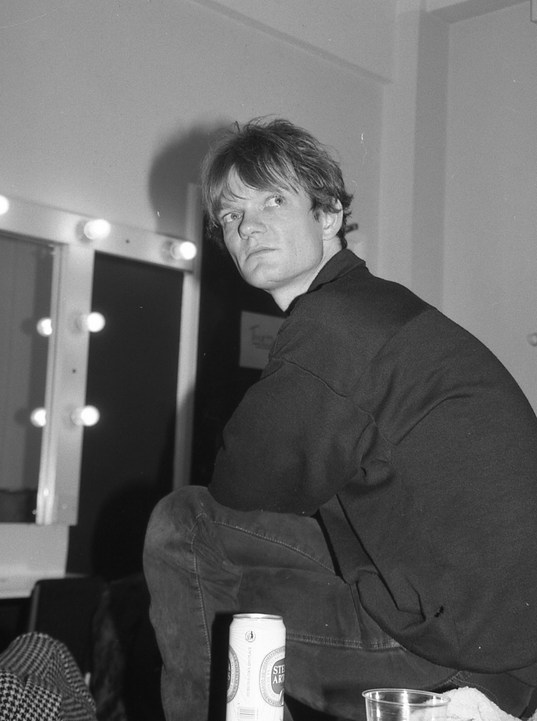
- Chadwick in 1989

Background information
- Born: Guy Stephen Chadwick; 21 March 1956 (age 70); Hanover, Germany
- Genres: Alternative rock
- Occupations: Musician, songwriter
- Instruments: Vocals, guitar
- Member of: The House of Love

Guy Stephen Chadwick (born 21 March 1956) is an English singer, songwriter and guitarist, best known as the frontman of alternative band the House of Love for which he wrote the majority of the band's material.

The son of a soldier, Chadwick was born in Hanover, Germany. He spent his earliest years in various countries including Singapore before returning with his family to England. After forming his first band The Kingdoms, who released one single on RCA that he would later describe as "dreadful", Chadwick met guitarist Terry Bickers in 1987 through an advertisement, and formed The House Of Love. They released their debut eponymous album in 1988.

They then signed to Fontana, and released their second album, also entitled The House of Love, in January 1990. The single "Shine On", originally released in 1987, reached No. 20 on the UK charts, and "The Beatles and the Stones" charted within the Top 40.

Following the departure of Bickers, the House of Love eventually split in 1993, and Chadwick re-appeared as a solo artist in 1997, and then released the album Lazy Soft and Slow in 1998.

The House of Love reunited in 2003. They went on to tour throughout the UK. Ireland and Sweden, and released an album, Days Run Away, in 2005. The band's self-titled debut album was reissued in 2007.
