= Translucent Flashbacks – The Singles =

Translucent Flashbacks

Compilation album by Spacemen 3
- Released: 1995
- Genre: Neo-psychedelia
- Label: Fire
- Producer: Peter Kember/Jason Pierce

Spacemen 3 chronology
Recurring (1991)	Translucent Flashbacks (1995)

Professional ratings
Review scores
Source	Rating
Allmusic	link

Translucent Flashbacks is a compilation album released in 1995 that combines the first three Spacemen 3 singles and their B-sides. The singles, which were released on Glass Records between 1986 and 1988, are "Walkin' With Jesus", the Transparent Radiation EP and "Take Me To The Other Side".

Different versions of many of these tracks can actually be found on The Perfect Prescription album with one track, "Rollercoaster," available on the debut Sound of Confusion album.

A version of this album was also released in the US by Taang! records and called Spacemen 3 The Singles; although this version's booklet gives no dates for the singles' releases and no information on the band, it features what may have been the original artwork for the individual record covers.

== Track listing ==
Walkin with Jesus (Sound of Confusion) (Nov 1986)

No.	Title	Length
1.	"Walkin' With Jesus"	3:59
2.	"Rollercoaster"	17:24
3.	"Feel So Good"	4:55

Transparent Radiation EP (July 1987)

No.	Title	Length
4.	"Transparent Radiation"	4:05
5.	"Ecstasy Symphany"	9:11
6.	"Transparent Radiation (Flashback)"	7:43
7.	"Things'll Never Be The Same"	8:08
8.	"Starship"	11:27

Take Me To The Other Side (July 1988)

No.	Title	Length
9.	"Take Me To The Other Side"	4:36
10.	"Soul 1"	5:39
11.	"That's Just Fine"	6:48
