= Hypnotized (Spacemen 3 song) =

Single by Spacemen 3

from the album Recurring
- B-side: "Just To See You Smile (Honey pt. 2)"
- Released: July 1989
- Genre: Neo-psychedelia
- Length: 6:01
- Label: Fire
- Songwriter(s): Jason Pierce
- Producer(s): Spacemen 3

Spacemen 3 singles chronology
"Revolution" (1988)	"Hypnotized" (1989)	"Big City" (1991)

Alternative Cover
- Cover of 7"

"Hypnotized" is the fourth single from the English alternative rock band Spacemen 3 and the band's first single to enter the UK charts. It charted at position #85. It was released in July 1989 as a 7", 12" and CD single. The first 5000 12" copies came with a free poster.

== Track listing ==
7" (BLAZE 36S)

No.	Title	Length
1.	"Hypnotized" (Pierce)	6:01
2.	"Just To See You Smile (Honey pt. 2)" (Kember)	7:50

12" (BLAZE 36T) and CDS (BLAZE 36CD)

No.	Title	Length
1.	"Hypnotized" (Pierce)	6:01
2.	"Just To See You Smile (Honey pt. 2)" (Kember)	7:50
3.	"The World Is Dying" (Kember)	4:55

== Personnel ==
=== Spacemen 3 ===
- Sonic Boom – vocals, guitar, keyboards, producer
- Jason – guitar, vocals, organ, producer
- Willie – bass
- Jon – drums

=== Additional personnel ===
- Alex Green – saxophone
- Owen John – violin
- Paul Adkins – engineer
