= Dreamweapon: An Evening of Contemporary Sitar Music =

Live album by Spacemen 3
- Released: 1990
- Genre: Drone music
- Length: 77:43 (2004 re-issue)
- Label: Fierce

Spacemen 3 chronology
| Playing with Fire (1989) | Dreamweapon: An Evening of Contemporary Sitar Music (1990) | Recurring (1991) |

Professional ratings
Review scores
| Source | Rating |
|---|---|
| AllMusic | 4.5/5 stars |

Dreamweapon: An Evening of Contemporary Sitar Music is a 1990 live album by Spacemen 3.

== Overview ==
The title track is from a live performance at Watermans Arts Centre in Brentford, London, on August 19, 1988. Peter Kember, Jason Pierce, Will Carruthers, and Steve Evans played. The piece was inspired by drone music, with a text from La Monte Young in the liner notes. The composition is a lengthy drone in the key of A. It was recorded in the foyer of a cinema as an audience waited for a screening of the film Wings of Desire; crowd noise and public-address announcements are audible. A brief melodic fragment from the improvisation was re-used as the basis for the song "Honey" from the group's 1989 album Playing With Fire.

The liner notes for this track credit Pat Fish, a.k.a. the Jazz Butcher, with "joint rolling."

The other track on the original vinyl release "Ecstasy in Slow Motion" is a studio performance from 1987 which only features Pete Kember. It does not feature on the original CD. "Spacemen Jam", which appears on subsequent reissues, is Peter Kember and an unknown second guitarist, possibly Jason Pierce. Jason is credited in the sleeve notes on the Sympathy for the Record Industry reissue. The track on the vinyl release plays backwards- from the centre outwards.

The album's title Dreamweapon is the creation of Angus MacLise, the original drummer for the Velvet Underground.

The Guardian printed an extract from Will Carruthers' memoir about his recollection of the recording of the album. In the memoir, Carruthers confesses that he failed to turn his amplifier on for the performance of the title track, making him inaudible on the recording.

== Track listing ==
Original release (Fierce)

| No. | Title | Length |
|---|---|---|
| 1. | "An Evening of Contemporary Sitar Music (Full-Length Version)" | 44:21 |
| 2. | "Ecstasy in Slow Motion" | 9:26 |

CD copies contain only "An Evening of Contemporary Sitar Music (Full Length Version)"

1993 re-issue (Sympathy for the Record Industry)

| No. | Title | Length |
|---|---|---|
| 1. | "An Evening of Contemporary Sitar Music (Full-Length Version)" | 44:20 |
| 2. | "Ecstasy in Slow Motion" | 9:26 |
| 3. | "Spacemen Jam" | 15:42 |

2004 re-issue (Space Age Recordings)

| No. | Title | Length |
|---|---|---|
| 1. | "An Evening of Contemporary Sitar Music (Full-Length Version)" | 44:20 |
| 2. | "Ecstasy Live Intro Theme" | 8:15 |
| 3. | "Ecstasy in Slow Motion" | 9:26 |
| 4. | "Spacemen Jam" | 15:42 |
