= Transparent Radiation =

1967 song by Red Crayola

Song by Red Crayola

from the album The Parable of Arable Land
- Released: June 1967
- Recorded: 10 April 1967
- Studio: Andrus Studio, Houston, Texas
- Genre: Psychedelic rock
- Length: 2:34
- Label: International Artists
- Songwriters: Mayo Thompson; Steve Cunningham; Rick Barthelme
- Producer: Lelan Rogers

"Transparent Radiation" is a song by the American rock band Red Krayola released in June 1967 on their debut studio album The Parable of Arable Land. The song featured label mate and 13th Floor Elevators frontman Roky Erickson performing on harmonica.

The song would be covered by English rock band Spacemen 3 in 1987, whose version peaked at number 29 on the UK Indie Chart in 1987.

== Red Crayola original version ==
=== Background and recording ===
The song was recorded on April 10th, 1967, Roky Erickson of the 13th Floor Elevatorswas invited to play harmonica:

When we had the backing tracks, Roky Erickson of the 13th Floor Elevators was invited in to play the organ part on 'Hurricane Fighter Plane' and played the mouth organ part on 'Transparent Radiation'.

The lyrics were written by drummer Frederick Barthelme.

=== Credits ===
- Mayo Thompson – guitar, vocals
- Frederick Barthelme – drums
- Steve Cunningham – bass
- Roky Erickson – harmonica

== Spacemen 3 version and EP ==
Transparent Radiation

EP by Spacemen 3
- Released: July 1987
- Genre: Neo-psychedelia
- Length: 36:30
- Label: Glass (original release); Fire (2011 reissue)
- Producer: Peter Kember & Jason Pierce

Spacemen 3 chronology
| Sound of Confusion (1986) | Transparent Radiation (1987) | The Perfect Prescription (1987) |

=== Background ===
The cover version of "Transparent Radiation" was written and recorded based on the March 1967 demo version of the song on the International Artists Epitaph for a Legend compilation album released in 1980 rather than the original LP version on The Parable of Arable Land. Peter Kember would call songwriter Mayo Thompson who at the time was working for Rough Trade for a transcription of the original lyrics. Kember stated:

I told him I wanted to check the lyrics to "Transparent Radiation" because we were covering it and he didn't remember the song. [...] Over 10 years later, I met him in Los Angeles and he said that he loved my version. He liked the way we'd taken it from four chords to three chords. At the time we didn't really know.

=== Track listing ===
12-inch (GLAEP108)

| No. | Title | Writer(s) | Length |
|---|---|---|---|
| 1. | "Transparent Radiation" | Barthelme, Thompson, Cunningham | 4:03 |
| 2. | "Ecstasy Symphony" | Peter Kember, Jason Pierce | 9:08 |
| 3. | "Transparent Radiation (Flashback)" | Barthelme, Thompson, Cunningham | 8:00 |
| 4. | "Things'll Never Be The Same" | Kember, Pierce | 5:49 |
| 5. | "Starship" | MC5, Sun Ra, Kember, Pierce | 11:00 |

== Personnel ==
=== Spacemen 3 ===
Produced and arranged by Sonic & Jason

- Sonic Boom (Peter Kember) – guitar, feedback, vocals
- Jason (Jason Pierce) – guitar, Farfisa organ, vocals
- Bassman (Pete Bain) – bass vibrations
- Rosco (Sterling Roswell) – percussion

=== Additional personnel ===
- Owen John – violin
- Graham Walker – engineer

== Bibliography ==
- Morse, Erik (2009). Spacemen 3 And The Birth Of Spiritualized (Kindle ed.). Omnibus Press. ISBN 978-0857121042.
