= Big City (Spacemen 3 song) =

Single by Spacemen 3

from the album Recurring
- B-side: "Drive"
- Released: January 1991
- Genre: Neo-psychedelia
- Length: 8:35
- Label: Fire
- Songwriter(s): Peter Kember
- Producer(s): Spacemen 3

Spacemen 3 singles chronology
"Hypnotized" (1989)	"Big City" (1991)

Alternative Cover
- Cover of 7"

"Big City" is the fifth and last single from the English alternative rock band Spacemen 3. It entered the UK charts at position #88. It was released in January 1991, shortly after the band split up, as a 7", 12" and CD single. The 7" contains a shorter version of the song than the 12". A remixed version was released separately. The 7" edit appears on the band's final album Recurring under the title "Big City (Everyone I Know Can Be Found Here)".

The track featured in the Simpsons episode Every Man's Dream, as the soundtrack to a psychedelic drug trip montage. It was used with songwriter Peter Kember's approval.

== Track listing ==
7" (BLAZE 41S)

No.	Title	Length
1.	"Big City (Edit)" (Kember)	4:35
2.	"Drive" (Pierce)	6:51

12" (BLAZE 41T)

No.	Title	Length
1.	"Big City" (Kember)	8:35
2.	"Big City (Waves Of Joy Demo)" (Kember)	3:58
3.	"Drive" (Pierce)	6:51

CDS (BLAZE 41CD)

No.	Title	Length
1.	"Big City" (Kember)	8:35
2.	"Drive" (Pierce)	6:51
3.	"Big City (Waves Of Joy Demo)" (Kember)	3:58
4.	"Drive (Demo)" (Pierce)	1:54

Remix 12" (BLAZE 41TR)

No.	Title	Length
1.	"Big City (Remix)" (Kember)	10:45
2.	"Drive (Remix)" (Pierce)	10:51

== Personnel ==
=== Spacemen 3 ===
- Sonic Boom – vocals, guitar, keyboards, producer
- Jason – guitar, vocals, organ, producer
- Will Carruthers – bass
- Jon Mattock – drums

=== Additional personnel ===
- Paul Adkins – engineer
