= The Perfect Prescription =

1987 album by Spacemen 3

Studio album by Spacemen 3
- Released: September 1987
- Recorded: V.H.F. in Rugby
- Genre: Neo-psychedelia
- Length: 45:39
- Labels: Glass (original UK release); Fire (various UK reissues); Genius Records (original US release); Taang! (1996 US reissue)
- Producers: Sonic Boom & Jason

Spacemen 3 chronology
Transparent Radiation (1987)	The Perfect Prescription (1987)	Performance (1988)

Alternative cover
- 1996 re-release

Singles from The Perfect Prescription
- 1. "Walkin' with Jesus" Released: November 1986; 2. "Transparent Radiation" Released: July 1987; 3. "Take Me to the Other Side" Released: July 1988

Professional ratings
Review scores
Source	Rating
AllMusic	4.5/5 stars
Drowned in Sound	9/10
The Great Rock Discography	8/10
Mojo	4/5 stars
MusicHound	4.5/5
Pitchfork	9.6/10
PopMatters	10/10
Record Collector	4/5 stars
The Rolling Stone Album Guide	4.5/5 stars
Spin Alternative Record Guide	9/10

The Perfect Prescription is the second studio album by British neo-psychedelic band Spacemen 3, released in 1987. It is a concept album, "a vision of a drug trip from inception to its blasted conclusion, highs and lows fully intact."

Pitchfork Media listed it at #50 in their list of the greatest albums of the 1980s.

The album was promoted with two singles, with the second single, "Take Me to the Other Side", releasing in July 1988 as a 12" single. It was recorded at VHF studios in Rugby, Warwickshire.

== Content ==
The music becomes progressively more orchestral and serene until the high of the trip, represented by "Ecstasy Symphony"/"Transparent Radiation (Flashback)," moving on to the moment of realisation where the high has faded and the comedown ensues, represented by the harsh opening guitar chords in "Things'll Never Be the Same." Coming down is represented in the blues-based "Come Down Easy," while the potentially fatal effects of an overdose are portrayed in the final track, "Call the Doctor." The music was written by the band, except "Transparent Radiation," which is a Red Krayola cover from the 1967 album The Parable of Arable Land. The band also borrows heavily from the gospel standard "In My Time of Dying" in "Come Down Easy," and it pays homage to Lou Reed in "Ode to Street Hassle."

== Track listing ==
All tracks are written by Peter Kember and Jason Pierce, except where noted.

No.	Title	Writer(s)	Length
1.	"Take Me to the Other Side"		4:40
2.	"Walkin' with Jesus"		5:03
3.	"Ode to Street Hassle"		3:54
4.	"Ecstasy Symphony"		1:54
5.	"Transparent Radiation (Flashback)"	Frederick Barthelme, Steve Cunningham, Mayo Thompson	9:03
6.	"Feel So Good"		5:24
7.	"Things'll Never Be the Same"		5:58
8.	"Come Down Easy"		6:42
9.	"Call the Doctor"		3:45

1989 re-issue (Fire Refire CD6)

Adds b-sides from the "Take Me to the Other Side" single as bonus tracks:

No.	Title	Length
10.	"Soul 1"	5:41
11.	"That's Just Fine"	6:50

1995 re-issue (Genius Records CD)

Adds two tracks from the "Walkin' With Jesus" single and the Transparent Radiation EP as bonus tracks:

No.	Title	Writer(s)	Length
9.	"Starship"	MC5, Sun Ra, Kember, Pierce	11:01
10.	"Rollercoaster"	Roky Erickson, Tommy Hall	17:01

1996 re-issue (Taang! Records CD)

No.	Title	Writer(s)	Length
9.	"Soul 1"		5:41
10.	"That's Just Fine"		6:50
11.	"Starship"	MC5, Sun Ra, Kember, Pierce	11:01
12.	"Ecstasy"		9:08

== Personnel ==
Spacemen 3

- Sonic Boom (Pete Kember) – guitar, tremolo, organ, vocals
- Jason (Jason Pierce) – guitar, organ, Farfisa organ, vocals
- Bassman (Pete Bain) – bass vibrations
- Rosco (Sterling Roswell) – percussion

Additional personnel

- Alex Green – saxophones
- Mick Manning – trumpet
- Owen John – violin

== Liner notes ==
The vinyl edition of The Perfect Prescription includes liner notes by author R. Hunter Gibson:

The Perfect Prescription is an album that will be left out of the rock 'n' roll readers, just as the great texts bid Bo Diddley throw down his cloak for the quickstep of Eddie Cochran.

If there has ever been an untrumpeted classic, here it is. An arcane, apocryphal document, this record, in late '80s UK, was telegraphing a message of unconcerned hope in a world hypnotised by guilt-ridden social work rock. Here, more than anywhere, Spacemen 3 have a vested interest in absolutely nothing.

It is revolutionary and militant where most angry young rock is liberal at best. It is extreme and accurate. Like Aftermath it captures every aspect of the age that would later be analysed. As the unassuming soundtrack of a country breaking down and a world breaking up, its very nature means that it has been ignored.

Spacemen 3, like all the great rock 'n' rollers, from Arthur Parker to Paul Gauguin, are revolutionary; this is their great manifesto, striding free from the pharmacy raid of their debut armed with the keys of the musical medicine cabinet. When we left off things would never be the same. But the other side of the locked door, well, it's like the white one in the story.

If Sound of Confusion denied the wider stretches of the sense in favour of the immediately, roughly sensual, this script panned out from some suburban global village Viet vet subculture into a poppyfield undersown with righteous paranoia. And still the smell of burning rubber on trash yankee wheels thickens the air ...

What goes on? Get the answer if you want it.

== Forged Prescriptions ==
Forged Prescriptions

Studio album by Spacemen 3
- Released: 2003
- Genre: Neo-psychedelia
- Label: Space Age Recordings

Spacemen 3 chronology
Playing with Fire (1999)	Forged Prescriptions (2003)	How the Blues Should've Turned Out (2005)

Forged Prescriptions is a compilation album by Spacemen 3 released on Space Age Recordings in 2003. It contains alternate and demo versions of songs from The Perfect Prescription, and some previously unreleased tracks.

In his liner notes, Spacemen 3 member Sonic Boom says this release presents the album's songs in their "full guitar laden versions with all the layers of beautifully streamlined guitar—considered by us to be too hard to replicate live and therefore reduced for the original release."

Disc 1
No.	Title	Length
1.	"Things'll Never Be the Same"	5:54
2.	"Walking with Jesus"	5:12
3.	"Come Down Easy (Demo Version)"	6:02
4.	"Transparent Radiation (Single Version)"	4:12
5.	"Ode to Street Hassle"	4:45
6.	"Call the Doctor"	4:11
7.	"Ecstasy Symphony"	9:06
8.	"Feel So Good"	5:28
9.	"Soul 1"	5:44

Disc 2
No.	Title	Length
1.	"Transparent Radiation (Demo Version) (cover of "Transparent Radiation" by Red Krayola)"	7:52
2.	"Come Down Easy"	6:43
3.	"Walking with Jesus (Demo Version)"	3:58
4.	"Things'll Never Be the Same (Demo Version)"	5:54
5.	"We Sell Soul" (previously unreleased, cover of "Don't Fall Down" by The 13th Floor Elevators)	4:56
6.	"Starship (Demo Version)" (previously unreleased, cover of "Starship" by MC5)	5:01
7.	"Take Me to the Other Side (Demo Version)"	3:50
8.	"Velvet Jam" (previously unreleased)	4:46
9.	"I Want You Right Now" (previously unreleased)	6:10
