= Recurring (album) =

Studio album by Spacemen 3
- Released: February 1991
- Recorded: 1990
- Genre: Neo-psychedelia
- Length: 78:33 (CD)
- Labels: Fire (original UK release); RCA (US); Dedicated (Germany); Space Age (2004 UK reissue)
- Producers: Peter Kember, Jason Pierce

Spacemen 3 chronology
| Playing with Fire (1989) | Recurring (1991) | Dreamweapon: An Evening of Contemporary Sitar Music (1995) |

Recurring is the fourth and final Spacemen 3 studio album, released in early 1991 on Fire Records. The band had broken up prior to the release of the album. During the recording, the relations between band members had soured to the extent that the record is in two parts – the first side by Peter Kember, and the second by Jason Pierce.

The album includes "Hypnotized", a Pierce composition that was released as a single in the UK in 1989.

Recurring peaked at No. 46 on the UK Albums Chart.

== Versions ==
The original UK vinyl pressing had only ten tracks, with shorter edits of two tracks. "Big City" was cut in half and "Billy Whizz" faded out before its "Blue 1" crescendo. The cassette release contained the same track listing but with full versions of all tracks.

"Just to See You Smile" originally appeared on the B-side of "Hypnotized", in an alternate mix listed as "Just to See You Smile (Honey Pt. 2)", owning up to the track's melodic affinity to the earlier Spacemen 3 tune "Honey". Elsewhere, "Why Couldn't I See" is another song whose main guitar riff is largely derived from the 45-minute improvisation Dreamweapon (the others were "Honey" and "How Does It Feel"); and "I Love You" features an uncredited sample of a Jan and Dean radio jingle for Coca-Cola (possibly written or cowritten by Brian Wilson, from 1963.)

== When Tomorrow Hits ==
The only track on which both Pierce and Kember appear is "When Tomorrow Hits", a cover of a Mudhoney song. It was originally intended for a double A-side split single, with Mudhoney covering "Revolution" from Playing With Fire. This release was scotched when Kember caught wind of the fact that Mudhoney had fitted "Revolution" with somewhat irreverent lyrics about methadone suppositories. The Mudhoney recording eventually surfaced as a b-side.

== Critical reception ==
Professional ratings
Review scores
| Source | Rating |
|---|---|
| AllMusic | 4/5 stars |
| Christgau's Consumer Guide | (1-star Honorable Mention) |
| The Encyclopedia of Popular Music | 3/5 stars |
| NME | 7/10 |
| Q | 3/5 stars |
| The Rolling Stone Album Guide | 2/5 stars |
| Select | 4/5 |
| Sounds | 3.5/5 stars |
| Spin Alternative Record Guide | 6/10 |
| Vox | 7/10 |

Trouser Press called Recurring an "undated adaptation of ’60s folky acid-rock with elements of the Beatles, Stones and others" and a "lullingly pleasant album." The New Rolling Stone Album Guide called the album "bad imitation acid house." Peter Kane in Q Magazine called highlighted the rave-inspired "Big City" and described the rest of the album as "wispy voices atmospherically draped over guitars that sparkle lightly".

== Track listing ==
Original vinyl release (Fire FIRELP23)

Side A
| No. | Title | Writer(s) | Length |
|---|---|---|---|
| 1. | "Big City (Everybody I Know Can Be Found Here)" (edited version) | Peter Kember | 4:45 |
| 2. | "Just to See You Smile (Orchestral Mix)" | Kember | 3:19 |
| 3. | "I Love You" | Kember | 5:32 |
| 4. | "Set Me Free / I've Got the Key" | Kember | 5:11 |
| 5. | "Set Me Free (Reprise)" | Kember | 1:50 |

Side B
| No. | Title | Writer(s) | Length |
|---|---|---|---|
| 1. | "Feel So Sad (Reprise)" | Jason Pierce | 2:46 |
| 2. | "Hypnotized" | Pierce | 5:57 |
| 3. | "Sometimes" | Pierce | 6:36 |
| 4. | "Feelin' Just Fine (Head Full of Shit)" | Pierce | 4:33 |
| 5. | "Billy Whizz / Blue 1" (edited version) | Pierce | 5:05 |
| Total length: | | | 45:34 |

Original cassette release (FIRE MC23)

| No. | Title | Length |
|---|---|---|
| 1. | "Big City (Everybody I Know Can Be Found Here)" | 10:50 |
| 2. | "Just to See You Smile (Orchestral Mix)" | 3:19 |
| 3. | "I Love You" | 5:32 |
| 4. | "Set Me Free / I've Got the Key" | 5:11 |
| 5. | "Set Me Free (Reprise)" | 1:50 |
| 6. | "Feel So Sad (Reprise)" | 2:46 |
| 7. | "Hypnotized" | 5:57 |
| 8. | "Sometimes" | 6:36 |
| 9. | "Feelin' Just Fine (Head Full of Shit)" | 4:33 |
| 10. | "Billy Whizz / Blue 1" | 7:33 |
| Total length: | | 54:07 |

Original CD release (FIRE CD23)

| No. | Title | Writer(s) | Length |
|---|---|---|---|
| 1. | "Big City (Everybody I Know Can Be Found Here)" | | 10:50 |
| 2. | "Just to See You Smile (Orchestral Mix)" | | 3:19 |
| 3. | "I Love You" | | 5:32 |
| 4. | "Set Me Free / I've Got the Key" | | 5:11 |
| 5. | "Set Me Free (Reprise)" | | 1:50 |
| 6. | "Why Couldn't I See" | Kember | 6:37 |
| 7. | "Just to See You Smile (Instrumental)" | | 3:19 |
| 8. | "When Tomorrow Hits" | Mark Arm, Matt Lukin, Dan Peters, Steve Turner | 4:26 |
| 9. | "Feel So Sad (Reprise)" | | 2:46 |
| 10. | "Hypnotized" | | 5:57 |
| 11. | "Sometimes" | | 6:36 |
| 12. | "Feelin' Just Fine (Head Full of Shit)" | | 4:33 |
| 13. | "Billy Whizz / Blue 1" | | 7:33 |
| 14. | "Drive / Feel So Sad" | Pierce | 5:34 |
| 15. | "Feelin' Just Fine (Alternative Mix)" | | 4:30 |
| Total length: | | | 78:41 |

== Personnel ==
Spacemen 3

- Sonic Boom (Peter Kember) – vocals, Vox Starstreamer, Burns Jazz guitar, Vox Super Continental, Vox Conqueror, acoustic 12-string guitar, synthesizer, samples, feedback, tremeloes, drones
- Jason (Jason Pierce) – vocals, Fender Telecaster guitar, acoustic guitars, autoharp, blues harp, piano and keyboards
- Will Carruthers – bass vibrations
- Mark Refoy – Fender Telecaster guitar, acoustic guitars
- Jon Mattock – percussion

Additional musicians

- Richard Formby – lead and rhythm guitars
- Pat Fish – flute
- Owen John – violins
- Alex Green – saxophones

Production

- Sonic Boom and J. Spaceman (Jason Pierce) – producers
- Paul Adkins – engineer
- Anjali Dutt – remix engineer (tracks 9, 11–15)
- Sarah Bedingham – remix engineer (tracks 9, 11–15)
- Mr. Ugly (Natty Brooker) – original artwork
