= For All the Fucked Up Children =

Studio album by Spacemen 3
- Released: 1995
- Recorded: 1984
- Genre: Neo-psychedelia

For All the Fucked Up Children is a 1995 release from the neo-psychedelic trio Spacemen 3. The record consists of what claims to be Spacemen 3's first ever recording session, from 1984. The music sounds like a primitive version of the group, the dominating sound of the record is a slow, droning psychedelic blues performed with spare instrumentation. A drum set is matched with a pair of distorted electric guitars, all of which provide a swirling foundation for Jason Pierce's vocals. The album's liner notes is an early review by Gary Boldie, where he contemplates the city of Rugby and finds it an odd source for this new sound, and while he declares Spacemen 3 as the "all singing, all dancing answer to the problems of a grey 1985," he admits they are still raw, a little too repetitive, and need time to blossom.

== Track listing ==
=== Side 1 ===
1. "Things'll Never Be the Same" (4:53)
2. "2:35" (2:57)
3. "Walkin' With Jesus" (4:03)
4. "T.V. Catastrophe" (7:18)

=== Side 2 ===
5. "Fixin' to Die" (8:06)
6. "Things'll Never Be the Same" (alternate mix) (4:40)
7. "Walkin' With Jesus" (alternate mix) (4:00)
