= Sound of Confusion =

Studio album by Spacemen 3
- Released: July 1986
- Genre: Garage rock, neo-psychedelia
- Length: 39:48; 71:20 (1994 re-release)
- Label: Glass (original UK release); Fire (various UK reissues); Taang! (1995 US release)
- Producer: Spacemen 3

Spacemen 3 chronology
Sound of Confusion (1986)	Transparent Radiation (1987)

Alternative cover
- 1994 re-release.

Professional ratings
Review scores
Source	Rating
AllMusic	3/5 stars
NME	5/10
PopMatters	8/10
The Rolling Stone Album Guide	3/5 stars
Spin Alternative Record Guide	7/10

Sound of Confusion is the first studio album by space rock group Spacemen 3, released in July 1986 on Glass Records. Four of the seven songs are cover versions; "Hey Man" combines the melody of Amen (gospel song) with the lyrics of Fixin' to Die Blues by Bukka White, "Rollercoaster", originally by the 13th Floor Elevators, "Mary Anne" (originally ″Just One Time″) by Juicy Lucy and "Little Doll" by The Stooges. The closing track "O.D. Catastrophe" clearly references the vocal melody of "T.V. Eye" by The Stooges, with an early version of the song even being titled "T.V. Catastrophe".

It was re-released in 1994 by Taang! including the three tracks on the Walkin' With Jesus EP and a demo of the song "2.35".

== Track listing ==
Original release (Glass GLALP 018)

All tracks are written by Peter Kember and Jason Pierce, except where noted.

No.	Title	Writer(s)	Length
1.	"Losing Touch with My Mind"		5:29
2.	"Hey Man"		4:49
3.	"Rollercoaster" (13th Floor Elevators cover)	Roky Erickson, Tommy Hall	7:50
4.	"Mary Anne" (The song "Mary Anne" is a cover of "Just One Time" by Juicy Lucy)	Glenn Ross Campbell, Neil Hubbard	4:13
5.	"Little Doll" (The Stooges cover)	David Alexander, Ron Asheton, Scott Asheton, James Osterberg	5:25
6.	"2:35"		3:08
7.	"O.D. Catastrophe"		8:54

1994 re-issue bonus tracks (Taang!)

No.	Title	Writer(s)	Length
8.	"Walkin' with Jesus"		5:52
9.	"Rollercoaster" (13th Floor Elevators cover. Extended Version)	Erickson, Hall	17:03
10.	"Feel So Good"		4:57
11.	"2:35" (Demo)		3:40

== Personnel ==
Spacemen 3

- Peter Gunn (Peter Kember) – guitar, feedback
- Jason (Jason Pierce) – guitar, vocals
- Bassman (Pete Bain) – bass guitar
- N. Brooker (Nicholas Brooker) – percussion

Additional personnel

- Bob Lamb – recording engineer
- Steven Evans – photography
