= Translucence (disambiguation) =

Translucence is the physical property of allowing light to pass through a material diffusely.

Translucence may also refer to:

- Social translucence, a concept in social information processing
- Translucence (John Foxx and Harold Budd album), a 2003 ambient album
- Translucence (Ply Styrene album), a 1981 post-punk album
- Venous translucence

Translucent may refer to:

- Translucent (album), a 2024 album by The Choir
- Translucent (manga), a Japanese seinen manga series
- Translucent Flashbacks – The Singles, an album by Spacemen 3
