= Every Man's Dream =

- The Simpsons episode
- Episode no.: Season 27; Episode 1
- Directed by: Matthew Nastuk
- Written by: J. Stewart Burns
- Production code: TABF14
- Original air date: September 27, 2015

Guest appearances
- Adam Driver as Adam Sackler; Lena Dunham as Candace, Hannah Horvath; Laura Ingraham as Therapist; Jemima Kirke as Candace's friend; Zosia Mamet as Candace's friend; Allison Williams as Candace's friend

Episode features
- Couch gag: A parody of several Beatles album covers. The last cover features a double-decker bus running over The Simpsons who were recreating the Abbey Road walk.
- Commentary: Matt Groening: Al Jean; Matt Selman; J. Stewart Burns

Episode chronology
← Previous "Mathlete's Feat"	Next → "Cue Detective"
- The Simpsons season 27

"Every Man's Dream" is the twenty-seventh season premiere of the American animated television series The Simpsons, and the 575th episode of the series overall. The episode was directed by Matthew Nastuk and written by J. Stewart Burns. It aired in the United States on Fox on September 27, 2015.

In the episode, Homer and Marge go through a trial separation. During this time, Homer dates a pharmacist and Marge dates the father of said pharmacist. Adam Driver, Lena Dunham, Laura Ingraham, Jemima Kirke, Zosia Mamet, and Allison Williams guest starred. The episode received negative reviews.

== Plot ==
Homer wakes up at the Springfield Nuclear Power Plant to an alarm, where he accidentally causes an electrical explosion at his desk. He falls back asleep while the fire is extinguished. He is taken to Springfield General Hospital, where Dr. Hibbert discovers Homer has narcolepsy, a chronic neurological sleep disorder. He receives a medical note, which he uses to excuse himself from performing daily tasks. Hibbert contacts Marge to ask Homer to get some medication, which he goes to collect. While in the queue, Homer complains about waiting before falling asleep on the floor. He returns home later that night without any medication and Marge can smell that Homer has been out drinking. After Marge complains at Homer, the couple go to see a therapist. The therapist says that Homer and Marge's relationship is falling apart and that the best option for them is separation, which could lead to divorce if things do not improve. Marge, frustrated with the sleeping Homer, agrees and tells him to leave for the time being. Homer tearfully packs his bags and leaves the family, with Marge admitting she is unsure when or if she will let him return. As Homer sleeps over at the Power Plant, hoping that Marge will forgive him soon like she did after previous break-ups, Lenny learns that Marge has changed her social media relationship status to "complicated". Homer then calls Marge to discover on her voicemail she has reverted to her maiden name, Bouvier.

After visiting Moe's Tavern, Homer goes to collect his medication, and meets a female pharmacist named Candace who agrees to go out with him, and they later spend the night together. Homer wakes up the next morning, worried about his marriage to Marge, and tries to call home to speak to her. He speaks to Selma, who reveals that Marge is preparing to go on a date. Homer goes with Candace to meet her friends at a coffee shop, and they both get tattoos which they show to Moe. Candace wants Homer to meet her father, and they go out for a meal. Candace's father, Roger, tells Homer not to worry about the age difference between him and Candace, revealing he has been dating a younger woman. Marge enters the restaurant, and she is in shock to see Homer is there, while he and Candace are appalled to see that she is Roger's date and that Roger has been spending time with Bart, Lisa, and Maggie. Roger apologizes to Candace for not being there for her, before he proposes to Marge. Marge agrees to marry Roger after the divorce is finalized. Candace suggests Homer should marry her, revealing she is pregnant with his child.

Homer wakes up at the therapist's office sitting next to Marge. Homer is relieved to discover it was only a dream, and he and Marge are still together. Homer tells the therapist how she should not have suggested that he break up with Marge, but the therapist admits she did not tell them to break up. Homer makes a promise to try and behave for the entirety of March, to improve their marriage. By March 31, the family see an improvement in Homer. Lisa is now eating meat, and Maggie can now talk. She sings "What a Wonderful World" with Homer confused by this, only to wake up in a bar alongside Candace, who hits him with a bottle of beer to wake him up. Homer runs to his family home to see Roger has taken Homer's place at the family dinner table. The family look happy, and Homer walks away, sobbing. Lisa walks out to see Homer, comforting him, and they hug each other. Roger calls Lisa back indoors by mentioning their pending game of chess and pony shopping, with Lisa promising Homer she will Skype him at Christmas. Homer cries out loudly. Marge wakes up in bed, alongside a snoring Homer, and is shocked to discover this was her dream, and wonders if it meant something about her marriage to Homer. They visit the therapist who is about to talk through a solution.

The camera pans out to reveal a tattoo of the entire scene on the back of Hannah Horvath from Girls. When asked what the tattoo meant by her lover Adam Sackler, she says it means "never get drunk in Brooklyn".

== Production ==
=== Development ===
A drug trip scene in the episode features "Big City (Everybody I Know Can be Found Here)", a 1991 song by the British band Spacemen 3. Episode writer J. Stewart Burns selected the song after deciding it would be a good fit for the scene, and was surprised that the song was not replaced with a less obscure choice in editing. The band, who often turn down requests to use their music on television, decided to approve the request because they felt the song worked well in context with the scene. The band's co-founder and guitarist Peter Kember told The Wall Street Journal that the song's usage in the scene was "something that’s usually for me a high point of The Simpsons oeuvre. I imagine it is what people in bands secretly, or openly, dream of. Animation is so useful for these sort of stretches of reality."

In a September 2015, interview with The Hollywood Reporter, Al Jean spoke about the episode, saying: "We were trying to get to the nub of the answer to the marital dilemma. Husbands and wives think differently, husbands and wives have friction — how do you solve it? When you get down to it, the therapist says it — and our answer is: there is no answer. We didn't realize it would get all this publicity that Homer and Marge were going to divorce. We were aware that we'd done a number of relationship episodes and people would go, "Oh, not another one!" There are always things that come up in a marriage that I think are worthy of comedy. But the takeaway we wanted was: When you think you've got a handle on it, that's when you're wrong. I would never presume to say I have marriage figured out."

The song playing during the couch gag was written and sung by Niall Marshall from his Beatles-inspired album.

=== Casting ===
In January 2015, it was reported that Lena Dunham would guest star as a love interest for Homer while he is separated from Marge. Executive producer Al Jean said Dunham would play a pharmacist, and the role was written with Dunham in mind. Like Dunham, the character would have visible tattoos.

In April 2015, Entertainment Weekly reported that Allison Williams, Zosia Mamet, and Jemima Kirke would appear as friends of Dunham's character. The four actresses starred together on the television series Girls. Television host Laura Ingraham would also appear as Homer and Marge's therapist.

== Reception ==
The episode received a 1.5 rating and was watched by a total of 3.28 million people, making it the most watched show on Fox that night.

Dennis Perkins of The A.V. Club gave the episode a C−, commenting "Just to be clear, there’s nothing inherently wrong with any of [the plot points of the episode]. The problem with this disastrously misguided season premiere is that the episode botches every one, exemplifying the current Simpsons lax and cynical tendencies before throwing the whole thing away with a series of handwaves so perfunctory as to render the entire episode not only thoroughly lousy, but completely inconsequential."

Jesse Schedeen of IGN gave the episode a 4.2 out of 10, saying "Perhaps there are still ways to get mileage out of the idea of Homer working to save his marriage, but this certainly isn't it. This episode wasn't just redundant, it operated on flimsy logic, mostly ignored Marge and seemed to have no problem with the idea of Homer shacking up with another woman. Worse, none of those problems even mattered in the end, because the whole thing proved to be one elaborate, pointless dream sequence. If this is a sign of things to come, Season 27 is going to be a long slog."

== Marketing ==
In June 2015, Variety published an interview with executive producer Al Jean. When prompted about the twenty-seventh season, Jean teased the premise of the premiere where Homer and Marge would be separated, and Homer would have another love interest. This news caused articles to be published regarding Homer and Marge's divorce. The reaction prompted Jean to joke that Homer and Marge were "bigger than Jesus." However, the stories were unfounded since they would only be separated instead of divorced. Jean also told people to read the original article. Later that month, a video was released of Homer and Marge reaffirming their relationship.
