= The Darkside (band) =

British indie rock band

- Origin: Rugby
- Years active: 1989–1993
- Label: Situation Two
- Spinoff of: Spacemen 3
- Past members: Pete Bain; Sterling Roswell; Nick Hayden; Craig Wagstaff; Kevin Cowen

The Darkside (or Darkside) were an indie rock band formed in 1989 by former members of Spacemen 3. After releasing two studio albums they split up in 1993.

== History ==
The band formed in Rugby in 1989 and was led by Pete Bain (a.k.a. Bassman), who had left Spacemen 3 just before their 1989 album Playing With Fire. Bain was then joined in the new outfit by his former bandmate, drummer Sterling Roswell (a.k.a. Rosco). Vocals were initially handled by Nick Hayden, but his departure forced Bain to assume that role. The group were signed to Beggars Banquet Records offshoot Situation Two throughout their existence.

The group debuted in April 1990 with the single "High Rise Love", which was followed by "Waiting for the Angels" and the album, All That Noise. With Rosco moving to keyboards, the group recruited Craig Wagstaff, whom they had known while in Spacemen 3. The band's next release was the mail-order only Psychedelicise Suburbia live album in 1991. In November 1991, the EP "Always Pleasure" preceded second studio album Melomania, which was released in January 1992. With the departure of guitarist Kevin Cowen following the LP's release, Bain then assumed guitar duties for the EP Mayhem to Meditate. When Situation Two rejected the demos cut for a third LP, the band disintegrated.

Since the band's split, Bain has recorded several albums under the Alpha Stone name and guested on several of former bandmate Peter Kember's E.A.R albums. Rosco has issued the solo album Ubik under his assumed name Sterling Roswell.

In 2017, the group released the five-disc box set Complete Studio Masters featuring nearly the entirety of its discography remastered, excepting the songs from "High Rise Love." The box set included demo versions, live versions, and previously unreleased songs.

== Discography ==
=== Albums ===
- All That Noise (1990), Situation Two
- Psychedelicise Suburbia (1991), Acid Ray
- Melomania (1992), Situation Two

=== EPs ===
- High Rise Love EP (1990), Situation Two
- Loaded on Bliss EP (1991), Munster Records
- Mayhem to Meditate EP (1992), Situation Two
- Lunar Surf (1993), Bomp!

=== Singles ===
- "Waiting for the Angels" (1991), Situation Two
- "Always Pleasure" (1991), Situation Two
- "Jukebox at Munsters" (1993), Munster Records

=== Box sets ===
- Complete Studio Masters (2017), Acid Ray / Media Roscom Productions

== Sources ==
- Erik Morse: Spacemen 3 & The Birth of Spiritualized (2004)
