= Performance (Spacemen 3 album) =

Live album by Spacemen 3
- Released: July 1988
- Recorded: June 2, 1988
- Venue: Melkweg, Amsterdam, Netherlands
- Genre: Neo-psychedelia
- Label: Glass (original UK release); Fire (1990, 2009 and 2013 UK reissues); Genius Records (1990 US release); Taang! (1995 US reissue)

Spacemen 3 chronology
The Perfect Prescription (1987)	Performance (1988)	Playing with Fire (1989)

Professional ratings
Review scores
Source	Rating
AllMusic	4/5 stars

Performance is the first live album from Spacemen 3, documenting a set from the Perfect Prescription tour. It was recorded on February 6, 1988, at De Melkweg, Amsterdam, the Netherlands.

== Track listing ==
Original release (Glass GLALP030)

No.	Title	Length
1.	"Mary-Anne"	4:37
2.	"Come Together"	3:44
3.	"Things'll Never Be the Same"	6:24
4.	"Take Me to the Other Side"	4:00
5.	"Rollercoaster"	7:09
6.	"Starship"	5:13
7.	"Walkin' with Jesus"	4:09

- LP versions omitted "Take Me to the Other Side"

1995 re-release (Taang! Records)

No.	Title	Length
1.	"Mary Ann"	4:32
2.	"Come Together"	3:48
3.	"Things 'll Never Be the Same"	6:23
4.	"Take Me to the Other Side"	4:02
5.	"Rollercoaster"	7:09
6.	"Walking with Jesus"	4:08
7.	"Repeater"	5:29
8.	"Starship"	5:04
9.	"Revolution"	6:27
10.	"Suicide"	15:09

== Personnel ==
Spacemen 3

- Sonic Boom (Peter Kember) – vocals, guitar, organ
- Jason (Jason Pierce) – vocals, guitar
- Bassman (Pete Bain) – bass vibrations
- Stewart Roswell – percussion

Additional personnel

- Riny Van Zoo Lingen – recording engineer
