= Sterling Roswell =

- Also known as: Rosco
- Origin: Rugby, Warwickshire, United Kingdom
- Genres: Drone music Electronic music Experimental music
- Occupation: Musician
- Instruments: Drums; Guitar; Vocals
- Years active: 1987–present
- Label: Fire
- Formerly of: Spacemen 3 The Darkside

Sterling Roswell (also known as Rosco) is a British multi-instrumentalist and artist, a former member of Spacemen 3.

== Career ==
Roswell joined Spacemen 3 in 1987 as drummer, and performed on the studio album The Perfect Prescription (1987) and subsequent live album Performance (1988).

After leaving Spacemen 3, he joined The Darkside in 1989—alongside Spacemen 3 bandmate Pete Bain—and recorded three albums with the band.

He then moved to Rome, Italy, where he worked with film-maker Massimo Di Felice. He subsequently relocated to London and released an AAA-associated 'space pop' single on the 'Mint' label subsidiary of Jungle Records.

In 2004 he issued the solo album the Psychedelic Ubik under his own name on Mint/Jungle Records. More recent recording credits include producing the Transparency LP with Sky Saxon of The Seeds on Jungle Records, guest percussion on Geraint Watkins' Dial 'W' for Watkins on Proper Records, keyboards on Tres Chicas Bloom, Red & the Ordinary Girl on Yep Roc Records and guitar with The Odeon Beat Club on Beatclub Recordings and a guest performance on Martin Belmont's album The Guest List.
