= Guitar Loops =

Studio album by J Spaceman
- Released: June 2006
- Recorded: June 2005
- Genre: Experimental, folktronica, drone, noise, ambient
- Length: 35:21
- Label: Treader
- Producer: J. Spaceman

J Spaceman chronology
| Guitar Loops (2006) | Spaceshipp (2008) |

Guitar Loops is the first solo album by Spiritualized frontman Jason Pierce under the pseudonym J Spaceman. It was recorded in one continuous take at Amazing Grace Studio in London, a few days before he was taken ill with pneumonia. Spaceman plays a Fender Jaguar through a Fender Superchamp and percussion. It was originally released in a limited edition signed printing on John Coxon's Treader record label.
