= Erik Morse =

American author and journalist (born 1979)

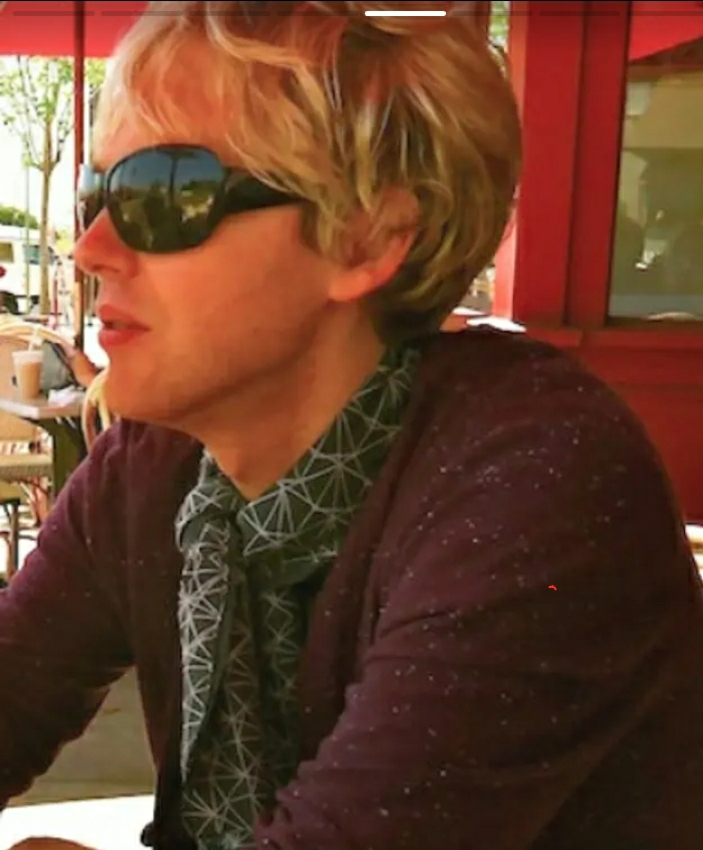
Erik Morse in San Diego, California, 2012

Erik Morse (or Eric Morse) (born November 1979) is an American underground author, rock writer and journalist. Morse was born and grew up in the small town of Conroe, Texas near a farm where Beat writers Allen Ginsberg and William S. Burroughs once lived in the 1940s. Despite a tumultuous teenage life in a Houston private school where juvenile crime ultimately led him to a stint in rehab, Morse went on to graduate from New York University with a degree in film and philosophy.

At the same time, Morse also met and worked extensively with New York City downtown writers and journalists - among them, punk laureate and Andy Warhol associate Victor Bockris, International Times' founder and The Beatles' biographer Barry Miles and Please Kill Me bon vivant Legs McNeil. After a chance meeting with Spacemen 3 founder and avant-garde musician, Sonic Boom (A.K.A. Peter Kember) in an East Village club in 2001, Morse began penning a lengthy and exhausting biography of the band during his final year of college. The completed text, known alternatively as Spacemen 3 and the Birth of Spiritualized or Dreamweapon – which detailed the two decade history of the legendary narcotic outfit – was published by Omnibus Press UK in 2004 and in the US in 2005. The book was featured in US and UK magazines Mojo, The Wire, Uncut, Harp, and Magnet as well as BBC Radio, and critically praised by Simon Reynolds, Thurston Moore, Dennis Cooper and Christian Fennesz. Morse has also written for various magazines and journals throughout the US and Europe, with features in Filmmaker Magazine, Frieze (magazine), Interview Magazine, Arthur Magazine, Bomb Magazine, Bookforum and Semiotext(e)'s Animal Shelter. He is currently a contributing writer for the San Francisco Bay Guardian.

Erik Morse has collaborated with Southern rock legend, filmmaker and photographer Tav Falco on a dual, 450-page encyclopedic history and psychogeography of the city of Memphis, Tennessee. The two volumes together are entitled Mondo Memphis. Falco's book is a study of Memphis beginning with the Civil War up to more recent autobiographical accounts of the city. Erik Morse's roman noir follows a West Coast graduate student and his encounters with a Memphis secret society. The volumes are published by Creation Books, and the limited edition hardcover was released in July 2011.
