= Will Carruthers =

British musician

Will Carruthers (born 9 November 1967, in Chesterfield, England) is a musician, best known for playing bass in the influential alternative rock bands Spacemen 3 and Spiritualized.

== Biography ==
=== Early life ===
Carruthers moved to Rugby in 1977, and joined St Mark's Junior school.

After leaving Lawrence Sheriff School at the age of 16, he went to work in a sheet metal factory in Birmingham, and it was then he began to teach himself to play bass. He then moved back to Rugby, and became involved in the local music scene, joining the local band, The Cogs of Tyme.

Carruthers plays a 1976 Gibson Thunderbird electric bass guitar.

=== Spacemen 3 ===
Carruthers joined Spacemen 3, replacing bassist Pete Bain, in 1988. One of his first gigs was the performance that would represent the live Dreamweapon album. He performed on Spacemen 3 third studio album, Playing with Fire released in 1989. Spacemen 3 toured extensively in Europe in 1989. Carruthers contributed to Peter Kember's solo side project, album Spectrum. He also played on Spacemen 3's fourth and final studio album, Recurring. At a time when internal conflict was rife in the band, Carruthers left the Spacemen 3 in 1990 before the album was completed. He went to work on a building site as a labourer to pay off the debts he had incurred during his time in the band.

=== Spiritualized ===
Following the demise of Spacemen 3, Carruthers was approached by Jason Pierce to join a new band that he was forming with all of the musicians from Spacemen 3 except Peter Kember. Carruthers was eventually persuaded to join, and the band recorded a single "Anyway That You Want Me", a cover of a song that was a hit for The Troggs. The band then began to tour rigorously around the UK and then recorded the album Lazer Guided Melodies. Before the release of the album, Carruthers left the band due to a payment dispute, and went back to the building site.

=== Hiatus from music industry ===
Disillusioned, Carruthers quit the music industry, and moved to the Lake District. He would not play live for four years. Carruthers drifted around the country, doing odd-jobs, working as a waiter, a cook, a gardener, on building sites, as a roadie and doing various other menial jobs.

=== Late 1990s ===
He was asked to join the band The Guaranteed Ugly in 1996 by his acquaintance Gavin Wissen who had been the singer for 'The Cogs of Tyme'. At the time, the group were Billy Childish's favourite band. The band played once a month at the Dirty Water Club in London supporting Thee Headcoats. Around this time, Carruthers was approached by Kember, to join his band Spectrum . Carruthers subsequently recorded an EP with Spectrum and The Silver Apples, and played many dates with Spectrum in 1999, most notably on tour supporting the Flaming Lips.

=== Freelovebabies ===
Freelovebabies is the name under which Carruthers is releasing his solo work. Live gigs featured Ricky Maymi from the Brian Jonestown Massacre on guitar, Joe Woolley on guitar, Mel Draisey from The Clientele on keyboards, Steven Beswick on drums, The Koolaid Electric Company's Dave Griffin on bass and Sam Barrett on percussion.

Written in Sand was written by Carruthers and the guitarist Kevin Cowen. It was self-recorded and released by Carruthers in 2001.

Home Improvement for Condemned Buildings is the second Freelovebabies album, and was released in 2006. It is available through www.willcarruthers.com. It features Jonny Mattock, Kevin Cowen, Mark Refoy, Fiona McCreath, Jon Wald and Adam Fernie.

=== The Brian Jonestown Massacre ===
Circa 2008–2010, Carruthers played bass and toured with the psychedelic band, The Brian Jonestown Massacre. He featured on their two albums, Who Killed Sgt. Pepper? and Aufheben.

=== Playing the Bass with Three Left Hands ===
In 2017 Carruthers published a memoir detailing, among other things, his experiences playing with Spacemen 3.
