= Spacemen 3 =

English rock band (1982–1991)

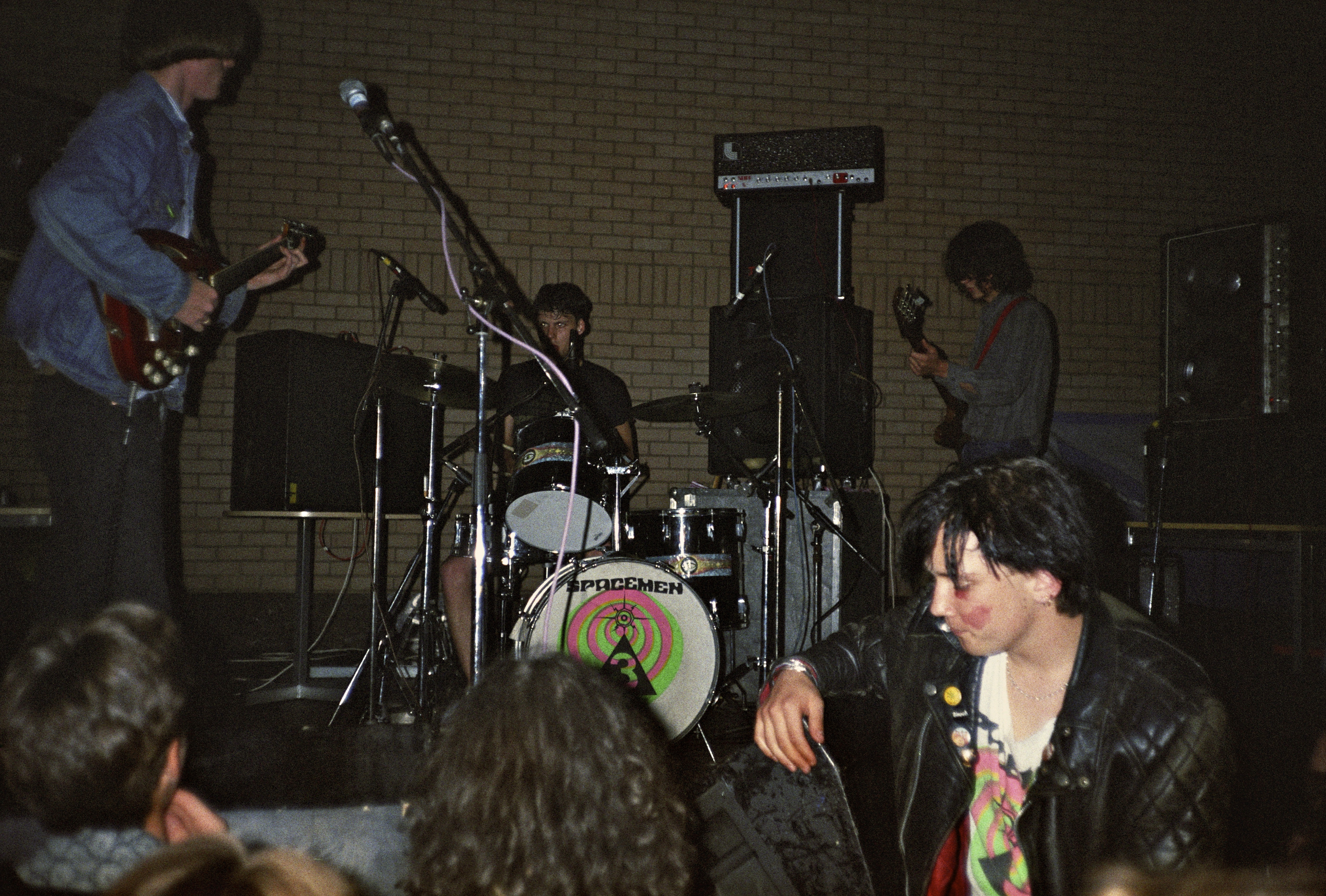
- Spacemen 3 in 1989

Background information
- Origin: Rugby, Warwickshire, England
- Genres: Neo-psychedelia; space rock; alternative rock; psychedelic rock; garage rock; blues rock
- Years active: 1982–1991
- Labels: Glass, Fire, Dedicated Records, Bomp!
- Past members: Peter Kember; Jason Pierce; Tim Morris; Pete Bain; Natty Brooker; Sterling 'Rosco' Roswell; Will Carruthers; Jonny Mattock; Mark Refoy

Spacemen 3 were an English rock band formed in 1982 in Rugby, Warwickshire, by Peter Kember and Jason Pierce, known respectively under their pseudonyms Sonic Boom and J Spaceman. Their music is known for its brand of "trance-like neo-psychedelia" consisting of heavily distorted guitar, synthesizers, and minimal chord or tempo changes.

The band drew inspiration from acts like the Stooges, the Velvet Underground, and Suicide. Following their debut album Sound of Confusion (1986), Spacemen 3 had their first independent chart hits in 1987, gaining a cult following, and through albums The Perfect Prescription (1987) and Playing with Fire (1989), went on to have greater success towards the end of the decade. However, they disbanded shortly afterwards, releasing their final studio album Recurring post-split in 1991 after an acrimonious parting of ways.

They gained a reputation as a 'drug band' due to the members' drug-taking habits and Kember's candid interviews and outspoken opinions on recreational drug use. Kember and Pierce were the only members common to all line-ups of the band. Pierce enjoyed considerable success with his subsequent project, Spiritualized. Kember has since found acclaim for his production work with indie artists, most often under the stage name Sonic Boom.

== History ==
=== Formation and early years (1982–85) ===
The creative and song-writing force throughout Spacemen 3's history were Peter Kember and Jason Pierce. They met at the (now defunct) Rugby Art College on Clifton Road, Rugby, Warwickshire in autumn 1982, both aged 16, and became close friends. Pierce was in a band called Indian Scalp, but he left them near the end of 1982 to collaborate with Kember. The two guitarists recruited drummer Tim Morris, who played with a couple of other bands and had a rehearsal space at his parental home, which they used. Shortly afterwards Pete Bain joined on bass. Morris and Bain had previously played together in a band called Noise on Independent Street. Pierce handled lead vocal duties. Now a 4-piece, the band originally adopted the name The Spacemen. Their first live performances occurred around winter 1982/83, playing at a party and then at a couple of gigs they managed to get at a local bar; at the latter their set included a 20-minute version of the one-chord song "O.D. Catastrophe".

In autumn 1983, Pierce, having finished his course at Rugby Art College, started attending an art school in Maidstone, Kent. This prompted Bain and Morris to leave and join a new local band, The Push, being formed by Gavin Wissen. Kember and Pierce recruited a replacement drummer, Nicholas "Natty" Brooker. They continued without a bassist and Pierce would regularly return to Rugby for rehearsals. In early 1984, they only performed at a few local, low-key venues. Still a trio, they changed their name to Spacemen 3. Kember explained:

The "3" came about completely by mistake. We did a poster which was just for The Spacemen, which we were for a while. But it was "The" Spacemen and I hated that, it sounded like a 50s rock 'n' roll group – that's all very well, but we didn't want to be imagined as... one of those surf bands. So we stuck the 3 on afterwards – that came about from a poster we did which had "Are Your Dreams at Night 3 Sizes Too Big?" with a very big 3 on it and it really worked as a logo, it just fell into place. It's really for the third eye.

Eventually, Spacemen 3 decided to produce a demo tape. In 1984 they made their first studio recordings at the home studio of Dave Sheriff in Rugby. This material – which included early iterations of the songs "Walkin' with Jesus", "Come Down Easy" and "Things'll Never be the Same" – was used for a short demo tape entitled For All the Fucked Up Children of the World We Give You Spacemen 3. They got a few hundred cassette copies made and produced their own artwork and booklet to accompany it, selling the tapes for £1 at a local record shop. Spacemen 3's music at this stage had a loose, swampy blues feel; some songs included harmonica and slide guitar, and their style sounded akin to The Cramps. These early demo recordings, which Kember later recalled as being "really dreadful", would later be released unofficially in 1995 on the Sympathy for the Record Industry label, thus providing an insight into the band's embryonic sound.

Around 1984 and 1985, Spacemen 3 were doing gigs every two or three months on the local Rugby/Northampton/Coventry circuit, and had a regular spot at The Black Lion public house in Northampton. Their gigs had an 'anti performance' element: Kember and Pierce would play their guitars sitting down and would barely acknowledge the audience. They would illuminate the stage with some cheap, old optokinetic disco light-show equipment which they had acquired, providing a psychedelic backdrop.

By summer 1985, Spacemen 3 were headlining at The Black Lion and becoming one of the biggest local bands. Around this time they started to co-host a weekly club night together with another local band, Gavin Wissen's 'The Cogs of Tyme'. 'The Reverberation Club', as it was called, was held at The Blitz public house in Rugby on Thursdays. "50s, 60s and 70s punk" records were played and it soon provided a live venue for Spacemen 3 and various other local bands. At one of their gigs at The Black Lion in 1985, they came to the attention of Pat Fish, the leader of the recording band The Jazz Butcher; he felt Spacemen 3 were "extraordinary" and "like nothing else".

=== Sound of Confusion era (1986) ===
==== Northampton demos ====
In November 1985, Spacemen 3 played a gig at a leisure centre in Coventry to an audience of fewer than ten people. Nevertheless, encouraged by the support of Pat Fish, they determined that they ought to record a new demo tape. By this time they had reconfigured and honed their musical style, and their repertoire consisted of newer songs and re-worked older ones.

At Pierce's instigation, Pete Bain rejoined the band on bass in order to fill out their sound. Despite being a 4-piece again, they would retain the name Spacemen 3. Kember and Pierce opted to upgrade their guitar equipment ahead of recording the new demos. Kember purchased a Burns Jazz electric guitar and 1960s Vox Conqueror amplifier; whilst Pierce bought a Fender Telecaster and a 1970s HH amplifier. Both of their new amplifiers included distortion/fuzz and tremolo; these two effects were key components of Spacemen 3's signature sound.

In January 1986, Spacemen 3 attended the Studio Morocco based at the home of Carlo Marocco at Piddington, outside Northampton, to record their new demo tape. They spent three-and-a-half days at the 16-track studio. Recording live as a group, with minimal overdubs, they managed to get demos for approximately seven songs. Kember and Pierce handled the production. with studio manager Dave Howard dealing with the technicalities. These "fine set of performances" would later be unofficially released as the vinyl album Taking Drugs to Make Music to Take Drugs To on the Father Yod label in 1990 (albeit described incorrectly as "rehearsals in Rugby").

Spacemen 3 managed to obtain a record deal shortly after producing their new demos. Pat Fish had given a copy of the demo tape to Dave Barker, the owner of the independent record label Glass Records, to whom Fish's band The Jazz Butcher were signed. Spacemen 3 signed a three-year, two-album recording contract with Glass Records in early 1986.

==== Debut album ====
Spacemen 3 were sent to record their first album, Sound of Confusion, at the studios of Bob Lamb in the King's Heath area of Birmingham. With a recording budget of less than £1,000, they completed the album in five days, with the last two days dedicated to mixing. Attempts at recording the title song "Walkin' with Jesus (Sound of Confusion)" were unsuccessful and abandoned.

Pat Fish was slated to produce the album, but he had commitments with his band, and Bob Lamb produced it. Kember and Pierce were unhappy with the results, and they preferred the Northampton demos instead.

The seven-track Sound of Confusion album had a heavy psychedelic style. It was "a full on, fuzzed up drone of relentless guitar pounding" (Ian Edmond, Record Collector), with a "rough garage energy " and "minimal, bluntly entrancing riffs". A NME review of the 1990 re-release said that the album was "A lo-fi, mostly low-key affair."

Sound of Confusion was released in July 1986. The cover artwork included shots of the band illuminated by their light-show equipment. The album was not received well, making little impression at the time, although it went on to reach no. 2 on the UK Independent Chart in 1989. Publicity for the album suffered from lack of funding by Glass Records.

During 1986, Spacemen 3 made live performances every few weeks. These continued to occur at local venues, with the exception of gigs in Chesterfield, Birmingham and, in August, their first appearance in London. The latter gig saw them receive their first reviews in both NME and Sounds.

Spacemen 3 are practitioners in the fine art of repetition; instinctively drawing on the lessons of their forefathers and adding an atmosphere, a mood and a sonorous backbeat of their own... they take hold of a chord and work every last permutation out of it before calmly working through to the next.

— NME: concert review, The Clarendon, Hammersmith, London, August 1986.

To follow up their album, Spacemen 3 made their first single, "Walkin' with Jesus" in 1986; the received decent reviews from NME and Sounds, and peaked at no. 29 on the UK Independent Chart, and no. 46 in the indie chart published by Sounds.

It was in 1986 that guitarist Peter Kember started to use his long-term alias 'Sonic Boom'. He had earlier employed the aliases 'Mainliner' and 'Peter Gunn'. Bassist Pete Bain also adopted his alias—'Bassman' or 'Pete Bassman'.

=== The Perfect Prescription era (1987–88) ===
==== 1987 ====
In January 1987, Spacemen 3 commenced work on their second album, The Perfect Prescription, which was recorded at Paul Adkins' VHF Studios, near Rugby; it was at the request of sound engineer Graham Walker. It took eight months and £3,000 to produce.

Whilst working on the album, "Transparent Radiation"—a cover of a song by the Red Crayola—was recorded, and released as a single in July 1987. "Transparent Radiation" was awarded 'Single of the Week' by Sounds, and matched the previous single in reaching no. 29 on the independent chart. The B-side included "Ecstasy Symphony", an experimental piece using an organ drone.

The Perfect Prescription was completed in September 1987 and released the same month. Kember described it as "kind of a concept album, it's about our better and worse experiences with drugs". Produced by Kember and Pierce, they agreed to restrict the amount of guitar overdubs in order that it would be easier to replicate the songs live. The Perfect Prescription received little critical attention in the UK, being better received in the United States. However, it represented Kember and Pierce's "collaborative zenith" (Erik Morse), and the album "is practically a best-of in all but name".

The Perfect Prescription "marked a serious artistic development, drawing deeper from gospel, ambient, and spiritual music, granting a serenity and depth to their spaced-out garage psychedelia". Much of the album did not feature drums. This was the first album on which Kember contributed lead vocals.

Spacemen 3 performed live on about twenty occasions during 1987. This included several gigs in the Netherlands and Belgium in March, and a few dates in London, Sheffield and Leeds later on in the year.

==== 1988 ====
In January–February 1988, Spacemen 3 undertook a six-week tour of continental Europe, encompassing Germany, Austria, Switzerland, the Netherlands and Belgium. Comprising nearly thirty gigs, the tour saw tensions and discontent arise between band members. After they returned to England, drummer Stewart Roswell quit.

Relations between Peter Kember and Jason Pierce were beginning to suffer as a result of Pierce's romantic relationship with Kate Radley, whom he had been dating since summer 1987. Kember resented the amount of time his song-writing partner was spending with her at his expense.

A UK tour in spring 1988 used stand-in drummers to fulfil live dates. Roswell's departure was followed by that of Pete Bain at the end of May. A replacement bassist was immediately appointed: Will Carruthers, a friend of the band who had recently been playing in another Rugby group, 'The Cogs of Tyme'.

In July 1988, Spacemen 3's third single, "Take Me to the Other Side", was released, from The Perfect Prescription album. The single received good press and was NME's Single of the Week.

Spacemen 3 reached a deal with Glass Records where in return for providing a live album, their contractual obligations would be deemed to have been met, and they would be allowed to leave. The album, a recording of their gig at the Melkweg venue, Amsterdam, was released in July 1988.

Following their departure from Glass Records, Spacemen 3 were without a record deal. The only offer they received was from the prominent independent label Creation Records. However, Creation owner Alan McGee was only able to offer a one-album deal and with no advance. This was not pursued.

It was at this juncture that Kember and Pierce chose to enter into a contractual relationship with Gerald Palmer, a Northamptonshire businessman and concert promoter who had already been functioning recently as Spacemen 3's de facto manager. This tripartite business partnership had the following terms: Palmer would own the master tapes of all future recordings, the rights of which would be licensed to record labels for release; touring and recording costs etc. would be financed by Palmer, who would give Kember and Pierce an advance of £1,000 each; and, in return, all profits would be split 50:50: 50% for Palmer, and 50% for Kember and Pierce and other band members. Significantly, this contract was only with Kember and Pierce, meaning Spacemen 3 as a legal and financial entity would, in essence, constitute only the two of them together with Palmer. In addition, Palmer became Spacemen 3's manager.

=== Playing with Fire era (1988–89) ===
==== 1988 ====
Around spring 1988 Kember was using his 4-track recorder to develop his ideas and several songs for the next album.

Recording for Spacemen 3's third studio album, Playing with Fire, started in June 1988. Palmer, booked ARK Studios in Cornwall for a month, though these sessions were not particularly productive. ARK Studios only had 8-track facilities and some of Spacemen 3's recordings were accidentally wiped by the in-house sound engineer. Rough demos were managed for Kember's "Honey" and Pierce's "Lord Can You Hear Me?". They still did not have a drummer at this point.

New bassist Will Carruthers made his first live appearance with Spacemen 3 at London Dingwalls on 20 June, where they were supported by My Bloody Valentine. It was after this gig that a confrontation occurred between Kember, Pierce and his girlfriend Kate Radley. Tired of Radley's persistent presence around the band of late – at recording sessions, touring and backstage at gigs – Kember enforced an agreed 'no girls on the bus' policy and barred Radley from boarding the tour van, leaving Pierce and Radley to find their own way home.

Recording for Playing with Fire recommenced despite a deteriorating relationship between Kember and Pierce; they returned to VHF Studios, outside Rugby, where they had recorded The Perfect Prescription. Of the eventual tracks on Playing with Fire, six were Kember's compositions, whilst only three were Pierce's. For the recording, individual parts were recorded separately, which meant band members did not have to be present at the same time.

On 19 August, Spacemen 3 gave an unusual live performance. Palmer had booked them to provide 'An Evening of Contemporary Sitar Music' in the foyer of the Waterman's Art Centre in Brentford, London, to act as a prelude to a screening of the film Wings of Desire. Kember, Pierce and Carruthers were joined by Rugby musician Steve Evans. They played a 45-minute jam, based around a single chord strummed by Evans, featuring riffs from some of the songs from their as yet unreleased Playing with Fire material. This performance was recorded and was later released, in 1990, as Dreamweapon. The crowd assembled for the film was not impressed, and, according to Pat Fish, one of the patrons remarked to the other: "To think that Elvis died for this!"

After initial plans to use drummers from The Weather Prophets and Thee Hypnotics for the recording of Playing with Fire, a permanent drummer was recruited in late August: Jonny Mattock. Despite this, he does not appear on Playing with Fire – a drum machine was used on all of the songs and no drummer is credited on the album. Mattock had been playing in a Northampton band called The Apple Creation. He was recommended by future Spacemen 3 guitarist Mark Refoy. Mattock made his live debut on 24 August at a gig at the Riverside in Hammersmith, London, and contributed to the new album. The new rhythm section of Carruthers and Mattock would remain constant for the rest of Spacemen 3's existence.

In summer 1988, Spacemen 3 managed to obtain a two-album deal with independent label, Fire Records. At a gig on 15 November 1988, advertised as 'Sonic Boom and Jason of Spacemen 3', only Kember and Carruthers performed.

The single "Revolution" was released in November 1988. The title track was a powerful, anthemic "mind-melting crunch". "'Revolution' was the chest-tearing noise that propelled them from complete obscurity to the cultosphere of young indie rock godz" (Jack Barron, NME, 29/7/1989). The single peaked in the top 10 of the indie charts, representing Spacemen 3's highest chart position yet, and was voted by radio listeners for inclusion in John Peel's end-of-year Festive Fifty. Awarded Single of the Week by the Melody Maker, it was extremely well received by the music press whose general attitude towards the band changed at this juncture:

["Revolution"] is one of the best records released by an independent band this year. Adjectives that come to mind are unrelenting, punishing, psychedelic. The razor-blade riffs lead you into a sonic underworld of alienation, desolation and raw power... [This] band are one of the most interesting around.

— Ron Rom, NME.

Spacemen 3 "became the indie phenomenon of late 1988" (Erik Morse). They were receiving more media attention and got their first cover story in Melody Maker's 19 November 1988 issue. Kember participated in many interviews, which provided controversy and journalistic focus on his drug-taking habits and his forthright views on recreational drug use. On one occasion, Kember invited his interviewer to accompany him as he collected his methadone prescription. Kember was regularly described in the music papers, incorrectly, as the "leader" of Spacemen 3, although he had not helped in this portrayal: in the Melody Maker article referred to above, Kember had stated, "This band is my design and the rest are totally into it."

Completion of the Playing with Fire album was delayed due to recording delays and a dispute about song-writing credits, which resulted in a physical altercation. Palmer mediated to resolve the feud. Palmer finally managed to obtain a compromise with Kember conceding split song-writing credits for 'Suicide'.

==== Sonic Boom solo project ====
In late 1988, Peter Kember was already working on new material for post Playing with Fire. His productivity meant he had a surfeit of songs, and he advised his bandmates of his intention to produce a solo album. New indie label Silvertone Records offered Kember a generous one-off album deal which he accepted. Kember finished recordings for his debut solo album and single in March 1989, prior to the commencement of Spacemen 3's European tour. Other members of Spacemen 3, including Pierce, as well as other musicians, had contributed sessions. Release of Kember's solo album (Spectrum) and single – under the moniker of Kember's alias, Sonic Boom – were put on hold in order to avoid a marketing clash with Playing with Fire.

==== 1989: Playing with Fire album release and tour ====
Spacemen 3's eagerly awaited Playing with Fire album was finally released on 27 February 1989. The album's front cover sleeve bore the slogan, "Purity, Love, Suicide, Accuracy, Revolution". Playing with Fire was Spacemen 3's first record to chart and one of the breakthrough indie albums of the year. Within weeks of its release, it was No. 1 in both the NME and Melody Maker indie charts. It was "their most critically and commercially successful album". Reviews were extremely positive and the album garnered wide critical acclaim.

It is a curious, brave, intriguing record, quite unlike anything that you're likely to hear elsewhere. And it's no mere novelty; more, I reckon, a minor triumph. 8½/10.

— Danny Kelly, NME

An early contender for album of the year.

— Paul Oldfield, Melody Maker

Playing with Fire, an extraordinary record, is the last thing we expected. Spacemen 3 have taken a courageous gamble in giving us this hymnal hologram instead of rocking out. They've done guitars before. Their earlier records are great. But this one is a vortex of vacuums, a mirage, a hallucinatory hypnosis, and as such is wilfully indulgent, defiantly grandiose... [It is] a major coup.

— Chris Roberts, Melody Maker

Spacemen 3 have kicked out the aimless jams, opted for colour, space and sensuality, and come up with the last word in English psychedelia.

— David Cavanagh, Sounds

With the exception of "Revolution" and "Suicide", the other songs on the album were mellower and softer than Spacemen 3's previous work, continuing the development of their previous album. "Playing with Fire... shows another side of Spacemen 3 – a slower, melancholic, blissfully refined pop band" (Ron Rom, Sounds). The band "created glazed, liquid songs with subtle arrangements and sheer reveling in aural joys...[Playing with Fire is] a feast of sound".

The Playing with Fire album was distributed in the United States on Bomp! Records, the label of Greg Shaw, who paid $10,000 for the rights. Spacemen 3 were popular in America and a prospective US tour was planned to start in September 1989. Greg Shaw organised the tour.

In February–March 1989, Spacemen 3 undertook a four-week UK tour comprising 21 dates, coinciding with the new album's release. Comments from gig reviews included:

Each ditty drives along a tidal wave of filthy sound, an effortless drone featuring the crispest slices of guitar sound since The Stooges… Spacemen 3 are better at this carbon monoxide garage trip than a thousand overrated US geetah schmucks. Weird, wonderful, frightening and out of their sheds.

— John Robb, Sounds

Tonight the Spacies play an absolute stormer... firmly establishing the Spacemen as one of the great rock experiences currently available to us. ...their full array of throbbings, pulsings, yowlings, reverbs, triple echoes and sheer whiplash volume.

— Danny Kelly, NME

At the start of the UK tour Kate Radley was again travelling in the tour van, thus causing tension between Kember and Pierce. After several gigs, Kember told Pierce this could not continue. For the rest of the UK dates Pierce and Radley, now living in a new flat together, made their own way to gigs.

The UK tour was shortly followed by an extensive and gruelling four-week tour of continental Europe in April–May 1989. This incorporated 22 dates across the Netherlands, France, Belgium, Denmark, Sweden, Germany, Switzerland, Hungary, Austria and Italy. (Radley was not present on this tour). Setlists remained more or less consistent around this period. For the purposes of live performances, Spacemen 3 played their more powerful or heavier – and therefore mostly older – songs, featuring little from Playing with Fire; although the odd softer song was played occasionally. Sets typically ended with the song "Suicide" which could last up to 45 minutes.

=== Break-up, final album, and formation of Spiritualized (1989–91) ===
==== 1989 ====
At the beginning of 1989 Spacemen 3 had been one of the "hottest indie bands in England" (Erik Morse) and were gaining the attention of major US record labels.

Spacemen 3 used the short break between the UK and European tours in spring 1989 as an opportunity to record a new single. Two songs were recorded, at VHF Studios: "Hypnotized", a new song by Pierce, who had recently acquired his own 4-track recorder; and "Just To See You Smile", by Kember. However, Kember accused Pierce of copying his sounds.

Whilst Spacemen 3 were on tour, Palmer prepared the new single for release. Without consulting Kember or Pierce, Palmer mastered the tracks, had the sleeve artwork designed, and selected "Hypnotized" for the A-side. When Kember found out he was furious; however, Palmer refused to postpone the pressing of the single. A resulting feud permanently damaged Kember and Palmer's working relationship.

In June, Spacemen 3 played ten UK gigs. Initially, Pierce was making his own way to these dates, but when he instead used the tour van there was a bad atmosphere between the two men.

The single "Hypnotized" was released on 3 July 1989. It was their "most anticipated release yet" (Erik Morse) and immediately charted inside the top 10 of the NME and Melody Maker indie charts. It was Sounds Single of the Week. After two weeks, Hypnotized reached No. 1 on the Melody Maker indie chart, and No. 2 on the NME indie chart (second only to The Stone Roses' "She Bangs The Drums"). It was voted No. 33 in John Peel's end of year Festive Fifty.

A third guitarist, Mark Refoy, had been recruited at the beginning of summer 1989, to play on later live dates and work on the next album. Refoy had been a friend of the band for several years, and had contributed to Kember's solo album. Refoy made his first live performance with Spacemen 3 at their Rugby 'homecoming' gig on 20 July.

On 23 July, Spacemen 3 played their biggest headlining gig at The Town & Country Club, London, a 2,000-capacity venue. On 22 August, they played a warm-up gig at Subterranea, London, for the Reading Festival, their first festival gig. Spacemen 3 played at the Reading Festival on 25 August 1989. This would transpire to be their last ever live performance.

At the beginning of September 1989, Spacemen 3 were about to undertake a substantial tour of the United States. The tour schedule had been finalised and they were due to be in America for the rest of the year, playing about 50 gigs. The band had grievances with Palmer, resulting in a meeting with no resolution or compromise. In an interview in 1991, Kember described Palmer as "the most devious guy I've ever had the misfortune to meet".

Kember and Pierce dismissed Palmer a few days after the meeting; however, Palmer was still one third of Spacemen 3. Additionally, he had already incurred at least £10,000 in recording expenses for the next album, and he stopped backing the imminent US tour, which resulted in a waste of resources.

The official explanation at the time – and that reported in the UK music press – was that the US tour had been cancelled because they had not been able to obtain work permits due to the drug convictions of band members. However, it has since transpired that this was not the case: work permits had been obtained for the band, albeit with difficulty.

Recording for Spacemen 3's fourth studio album, Recurring, had commenced at the beginning of August 1989, again at VHF Studios. According to Mark Refoy, Kember and Pierce rarely appeared at the studio at the same time and there was "quite a tense atmosphere" between them, particular over accusations from Kember that Pierce had copied him.

Afterwards, the two were now estranged and working completely separately. They agreed to have separate sides of the album for their own songs, all of which they had written and composed individually. The other three band members – Carruthers, Mattock and Refoy – who all went on to join Spiritualized (Pierce's project), were called in to contribute sessions when required.

In late September, Kember made a solo performance at a gig supporting The Telescopes. Kember and Pierce agreed to be in the studio together to record a cover of Mudhoney's "When Tomorrow Hits", for a prospective split single with Mudhoney. When Kember heard Mudhoney's version of "Revolution", with altered lyrics, he was offended and this collaborative Sub Pop release was called off however. The recording of "When Tomorrow Hits" was the last occasion Kember and Pierce would work together. Disconsolate Will Carruthers left the band at this point, fed up with the discord and lack of remuneration.

Recording for the album proceeded slowly and was still ongoing in Autumn 1989, by which point Kember had used two to three times the amount of studio time as Pierce. According to band members, Kember's behaviour was becoming increasingly obsessive and erratic. He was regularly missing booked studio slots. In late October, Kember's debut solo single, "Angel" was released. It received a lukewarm reception.

On 14 November 1989, the four remaining Spacemen 3 band members met to discuss finishing the album and arranging future live dates. The meeting was unproductive. Reportedly, Kember and Pierce both said little. Jonny Mattock told Kember he was difficult to work with. Mattock and Mark Refoy, both peeved, left the meeting prematurely and effectively resigned from Spacemen 3. In December, Gerald Palmer attempted to mediate between his business partners, Kember and Pierce, meeting them individually because Pierce reportedly refused contact with Kember.

==== Dedicated record deal ====
During 1989, Gerald Palmer had been courting interest and offers from US major record labels. Palmer had been postponing a decision hoping the US tour would lever improved offers. Negotiations with Dedicated Records, a satellite label of BMG, had been ongoing for several months. The poor intra-band relations had remained secret for the sake of outward appearance. By October 1989, the latest offer from Dedicated was a five-album, multimillion-dollar deal, with a £60,000 advance. Palmer had expended £15,000 on legal fees, and because he had managed to negotiate out the standard Leaving Member Clause, Kember and Pierce were in a 'win-win situation'.

In December, the three met to arrange signing the Dedicated record deal. Pierce insisted that Kember sign an agreement stating that the two of them had equal rights to Spacemen 3, to mutually protect them by preventing either party potentially claiming ownership of the Spacemen 3 name should the other quit. Coerced by the attraction of his portion of the Dedicated advance, Kember signed it. Mattock claims Kember attacked Pierce in the street the next morning. At the beginning of 1990, Kember and Pierce attended the London offices of Dedicated separately to sign the record contract. A few days later, at a dinner (at the Paper Tiger Chinese restaurant in Lutterworth, Leicestershire) with Dedicated executives, Kember and Pierce were cordial with the other guests but didn't talk with one another. The pretence was kept up until the end; Palmer did not inform Dedicated about the band breaking up until March.

==== 1990 ====
In late 1989, Jason Pierce, dissatisfied with his mixes at VHF Studios, took his recordings for the Recurring album to Battery Studios, London. Assisted by engineer/producer Anjali Dutt, Pierce completed final remixes of his songs in January 1990. However, Peter Kember's side of the album was far from ready, and he resorted to calling on the help of Richard Formby, a producer. According to Formby, when he arrived, Kember's recording was only half done; some songs were incomplete, and two had to be re-recorded from scratch.

In January 1990, Kember's side project and debut solo album, Spectrum (Sonic Boom), was released. Recorded nearly a year previously, Kember had used the project as a vehicle for a group of melancholic themed songs, having decided to save his more upbeat work for Spacemen 3 and Recurring. The Spectrum album was advertised as being by the "founder member/leader of Spacemen 3".

Also in January, Pierce was developing ideas for forming a new band or side project of his own. He invited Spacemen 3 compatriots, Refoy, Carruthers and Mattock, to jam and rehearse with him at a small church hall and his flat. Initially it was informal, but this was the origin of Pierce's Spacemen 3 'splinter' band, Spiritualized, comprising all the same members as Spacemen 3 except for Kember. In February 1990, this new grouping recorded "Anyway That You Want Me". This was recorded at VHF Studios; the purpose of these sessions was kept secret from Kember who was still working there. Speaking in 1991, Pierce explained the purpose of starting Spiritualized:

It was so as though I could get back on the road again. Pete [Kember] was still doing tracks for Recurring, and it was a long way off Spacemen 3 touring again, so I wanted to do another tour. So, initially, it [Spiritualized] was set up as a means to get back on the road.

Kember continued on completing his Recurring material. His indecision and constant remixing was prolonging the recording of the album. Gerald Palmer was still funding the studio time, and warned Kember to finish. Eventually, intolerant of any more delays, Palmer attended VHF Studios. He seized Kember's tapes, carrying out a previous threat, and chose the final mixes for release. There were reportedly dozens of different mixes for each song.

In June 1990, Spiritualized released their debut single, "Anyway That You Want Me". This was a cover of a song by The Troggs which Spacemen 3 had demoed in 1988 during their Playing with Fire sessions. The single's cover sleeve, which had no text on it, controversially bore a sticker saying "Spacemen 3". Furthermore, adverts for the single featured the Spacemen 3 logo.

The release of the Spiritualized single was the first Kember had definite knowledge of the band's existence. The circumstances surrounding the single and its marketing prompted Kember to announce that he was leaving Spacemen 3 and that the band no longer existed. Kember, interviewed in 1991:

I was pretty peeved because the whole thing was done in total secrecy, and everyone involved was told not to tell me about it, which is quite different from my solo project which was all done totally in the open.

In the latter half of 1990, Pierce's new band, Spiritualized, toured around the UK. They performed songs from the then as yet unreleased Recurring, as well as new material. Spiritualized signed a record deal with Dedicated and recorded their debut album in winter 1990/91.

==== 1991 ====
In January 1991, the Spacemen 3 single Big City/Drive was released. Both songs from the double A-side single were from the soon to be released Recurring. Kember and Pierce had been due to be at the studio for the mastering of the single, however Pierce did not attend. At that point the two had hardly spoken face to face in over six months. Kember decided to fade out several minutes of Pierce's song from the single, "Drive".

The last Spacemen 3 album, Recurring, was finally released in February 1991. Although the band had not officially disbanded, for all intents and purposes it was a posthumous release. The two sides of the album – one by Kember (A-side), the other by Pierce (B-side) – reflected the split between the band's two main personnel.

The songs on Recurring had been composed in 1989. It expanded on the sounds of the previous, Playing with Fire album. Musically, it was richer and lusher, but Kember and Pierce's respective halves of Recurring were distinctly different and presaged the solo material which they were already working on by the time of the album's release. Kember's side demonstrated his pop and ambient sensibilities; Pierce's side indicated his sympathy for gospel and blues music and his interest in lush production.

Pierce's sound is more lyrical and dramatic, building songs into climaxes. Sonic Boom's lengthy textured pieces move horizontally – a rhythmic, hypnotic pulse from start to finish.

— Steve Malins, Vox.

What we have here, then, are two very fine solo mini-LPs bolted together under the same moniker. ....a swirling stasis of sound that overcomes you like fumes.... Jason's Spaceman sound is more desolate and grandiose than Sonic's.

— David Stubbs, Melody Maker.

Recurring is a fine album. Laid back to the point of bed sores, its hushed vocals, pulsing backbeats and warm walls of sound infuse an introverted beauty with a keen r'n'r understanding. The two sides run on a similar vibe, although Jason's is a tad more conventional, riding on vocal atmospherics and a dreamtime feel, while Sonic's is sparser, pulling on a more disparate source of influences as shown on "Big City", the LP's killer cut as well as the current fab single.

— John Robb, Sounds.

In 1991 Kember and Pierce were pursuing their musical careers with their own bands, Spectrum and Spiritualized respectively. The release of Recurring prompted renewed press speculation about the future of Spacemen 3. No official statement explained why, or confirmed whether, Spacemen 3 had broken up.

I don't really see any problem anyway, if you buy Pete's album and you buy mine, you've got a Spacemen 3 album anyhow, by combining the two

— Jason Pierce – Sounds, 09/02/1991.

They [Kember and Pierce] were very close friends – they started the band together, but musically and socially they drifted apart. There was never a specific incident – like in a lot of talented bands – there's just a lot of friction between them.

— Dave Bedford (PR Officer, Fire Records) – Vox, April 1991.

=== Band members' activities post Spacemen 3 ===
Most members of Spacemen 3 have continued to produce music and record either collaboratively or in solo projects. Peter Kember (alias 'Sonic Boom') has had a solo career releasing music under the monikers Spectrum and E.A.R., and has also done production work for MGMT, Panda Bear, Beach House Dean & Britta and The Flowers of Hell. Jason Pierce (alias 'J. Spaceman') remains the leader and creative force, and only constant member, of the alternative band Spiritualized who have achieved significant critical acclaim and commercial success. Both Kember and Pierce continue to perform some Spacemen 3 songs live (e.g. "Transparent Radiation", "Revolution", "Suicide", "Set Me Free", "Che" and "Let Me Down Gently" [Kember]; and "Take Me to the Other Side", "Walkin' with Jesus", "Amen" and "Lord Can You Hear Me?" [Pierce]).

Will Carruthers, Jonny Mattock and Mark Refoy formed Spiritualized with Pierce in early 1990. Carruthers left the band after the first album in 1992; followed by Mattock and Refoy in 1994. Refoy then fronted Slipstream who released two albums. Refoy played guitar for the Pet Shop Boys on their live tour in 2007. Will Carruthers took a hiatus from the music industry after leaving Spiritualized; but subsequently has worked with Kember, recorded two solo albums as Freelovebabies, and has most recently toured with The Brian Jonestown Massacre. Carruthers, Mattock and Refoy have also collaborated on projects together.

After leaving Spacemen 3 in 1988, both Pete Bain and Sterling Roswell (aka Rosco) joined the neo-psychedelic band the Darkside who released several albums. Following the end of Darkside, Bain formed Alphastone, and has assisted Kember on some of the latter's solo projects. As of 2010 he provides vocals and guitar in The Urgz. Stewart Roswell (alias Sterling Roswell) released a solo album, The Psychedelic Ubik, in 2004.

In the early 1990s, early Spacemen 3 drummer Natty Brooker played bass under the alias Mr Ugly in a garage rock band The Guaranteed Ugly, with Gavin Wissen. They released two albums. Brooker provided cover artwork for Spacemen 3's Recurring album and early Spiritualized releases. Brooker died of cancer on Friday 18 April 2014.

A partial and unofficial 'reunion' of Spacemen 3 occurred on 15 July 2010 at a benefit gig dubbed 'A Reunion of Friends', organised for former Spacemen 3 drummer Natty Brooker (diagnosed with terminal cancer) at the Hoxton Bar and Grill in London where there was a retrospective exhibition of his artwork. Will Carruthers said of the event, "This is as close as you'll get to a Spacemen 3 reunion, trust me." The participants were: Peter Kember (keyboard/guitar/vocals); Will Carruthers (bass); Jonny Mattock (drums); Mark Refoy (guitar); Jason Holt (guitarist from Kember's touring Spectrum band); and guest appearances from Pat Fish (vocals), and Kevin Shields (guitar) of My Bloody Valentine. They played a 45-minute set comprising the songs 'Walkin' with Jesus', 'Revolution' and 'Suicide'.

== Musical style and influences ==
Sonically, Spacemen 3's music was characterised by fuzzy and distorted electric guitars, stuttering tremolo effects and wah-wah, the employment of 'power chords' and simple riffs, harmonic overtones and drones, softly sung/spoken vocals, and sparse or monolithic drumming. Their earlier record releases were guitar 'heavy', sounding Stooges-esque and "a bit like a punked-up garage rock band"; whilst their later work was mostly sparser and softer with more textural techniques and augmented by organs, resulting in "their signature trance-like neo-psychedelia". Kember described it as "very hypnotic and minimal; every track has a drone all the way through it".

Spacemen 3 were adherents to the "minimal is maximal" philosophy of Alan Vega, singer for the American duo Suicide who were known for their ominously repetitive music. Kember has articulated the maxim: "One chord best, two chords cool, three chords okay, four chords average".

Spacemen 3 had the dictum "taking drugs to make music to take drugs to". Kember candidly admitted to his frequent drug taking—including cannabis, LSD, magic mushrooms, MDMA, amphetamine and cocaine—and being a former heroin addict. Much of Spacemen 3's music concerned documenting the drug experience and conveying the related feelings. In NME's 2011 list, the '50 Druggiest Albums' of all time, Spacemen 3's Northampton Demos release, Taking Drugs to Make Music to Take Drugs To, was ranked No. 23.

The group took influence from The Stooges, The Velvet Underground, and The Rolling Stones. Additionally, various proto-punk and psychedelic bands influenced them.

Spacemen 3 recorded and performed numerous covers and re-workings of other bands' songs, particularly earlier on in their history, and this was indicative of their influences. The Spacemen 3 song "Suicide" was a clear acknowledgement of one of their influences: when performed live it was usually introduced as "this song is dedicated to Martin Rev and Alan Vega – Suicide".

Kember was also interested in drone music and everyday ambient sounds such as those created by electric razors, washing machines, lawnmowers, planes, motor engines and passing cars.

Their musical style has been described as neo-psychedelia, space rock, psychedelic rock, alternative rock, garage rock and blues rock.

== Legacy ==
"Spacemen 3 were one of the most revolutionary UK guitar bands" (Ian Edmond, Record Collector). They produced "some of the most visceral and psychedelic music of all time...and set a sonic template that influenced a generation, inspiring countless bands" (Julian Woolsey, Rock Edition). Writing in spring 1991, just after the band had split, Vox's Stephen Dalton referred to Spacemen 3 as "one of the most influential underground bands of the last decade".

"Amen" is used as the theme song for the Vice show "Abandoned".

In 1998, a tribute album to Spacemen 3 was released by the Rocket Girl label. A Tribute to Spacemen 3 included covers by bands such as Mogwai, Low, Bowery Electric and Bardo Pond. The album liner notes stated: "There are so many current bands who draw their influences from Spacemen 3 that now seems an appropriate time to show tribute to this underrated band."

In 2004, US journalist Erik Morse's biography of the band's life and work, Spacemen 3 & The Birth of Spiritualized, was published.

=== Rereleases since the band disbanded ===
In the two decades following the break-up of Spacemen 3, a large amount of previously unreleased recordings has been released, adding significantly to the Spacemen 3 canon. This material includes: live recordings; demos; earlier iterations of certain songs; alternate versions of many songs; some unfinished work; and some entirely previously unreleased songs. These releases have been both official and unofficial, and some have been issued by the Kember/Palmer-affiliated label Space Age Recordings.

Losing Touch with Your Mind, an unofficial release of 1991, was a compilation of alternate song versions and rare releases. The 1993 re-release of Dreamweapon on the Sympathy for the Record Industry label – which included the intriguing live 44-minute Eastern-inspired drone music performance at the Watermans Art Centre, Brentford, London, of August 1988 – was augmented with a previously unreleased recording of a jam.

1995 saw the unofficial release of the band's first demo tape: For All the Fucked Up Children of This World We Give You Spacemen 3. Dating to 1984, this provided an interesting insight into the band's earliest work and "rougher" sound. These recordings pre-dated the other early demos previously made available on the 1990 unofficial, Father Yod release entitled Taking Drugs to Make Music to Take Drugs To.

The 1994 re-release of the Taking Drugs to Make Music to Take Drugs To (Northampton Demos) album included several previously unreleased alternate song versions and other bonus tracks.

Two live albums were released in 1995: Live in Europe 1989 (also released in 1995 as Spacemen Are Go! on the Bomp! label, but without 'Take Me to the Other Side' and an alternate take of 'Suicide') which represented the first release of the band's live work from their lengthy 1989 continental tour; and Revolution or Heroin, a bootleg of performances from the band's 1988 gig at the University of London Students Union. The former has been described as "far better than the more ragged earlier Spacemen 3 live album, 1988's Performance".

In 1999, Spacemen 3's third studio album, Playing with Fire, was given a special, 10th-anniversary re-release. This official double disc release comprised all the original recordings together with previously unreleased alternate versions, demos and covers (e.g. The Perfect Disaster's "Girl on Fire" and The Troggs' "Anyway That You Want Me") from the same studio sessions. This re-release has been described as the "definitive" version of the Playing with Fire album.

In 2004, Spacemen 3's second studio album, The Perfect Prescription, was also given the special re-release treatment. The double disc official release, entitled Forged Prescriptions, comprised alternate mixes of the original album tracks together with previously unreleased alternate versions, demos and covers (e.g. The Spades' "We Sell Soul" and The Troggs' "I Want You") from the same studio sessions. Kember's liner notes explain that the alternative mixes represent the more multi-layered versions which he and Pierce agreed not to use because they would be unable to satisfactorily reproduce their sound live.

A bootleg called the Out of It Sessions comprises demo recordings of early iterations of songs from The Perfect Prescription album.

In 2005, Kember produced and released his own limited edition, double disc album, How the Blues Should've Turned Out. This wholly comprised previously unreleased material, including alternate versions, rough demos, unfinished work etc.

== Personnel ==
=== Other musician contributions at studio session recordings ===
- Violin – Owen John † §
- Cello – Josephine Wiggs (of The Perfect Disaster) ‡
- Saxophone – Pat Fish (of The Jazz Butcher) §
- Saxophone – Alex Green (of The Jazz Butcher)† §
- Trumpet – Mick Manning (of The Jazz Butcher) †
- Flute – Pat Fish (of The Jazz Butcher) §
- Guitars/keyboards – Richard Formby (of The Jazz Butcher and Spectrum) §

† The Perfect Prescription || § Recurring || ‡ "Girl on Fire" (demo) ||

== Discography ==
=== Studio albums ===
| Album | Release year | Chart | Label |
|---|---|---|---|
| Sound of Confusion | 1986 | UK Indie no. 2 | Glass |
| The Perfect Prescription | 1987 | UK Indie no. 13 | Glass |
| Playing with Fire | 1989 | UK Indie no. 1 | Fire |
| Recurring | 1991 | UK no. 46 | Fire |

Live albums

- Performance (Glass) 1988 [recorded at Melkweg gig, Amsterdam, 1988] – UK Indie no. 18
- Dreamweapon (Cheree) 1990 ['An Evening of Contemporary Sitar Music' performance at Watermans Art Centre, Brentford, London, 1988]
- Live in Europe 1989 (Space Age) / Spacemen Are Go! (Bomp!) 1995 [recorded during 1989 European tour]

Compilation albums

- Translucent Flashbacks – The Glass Singles (Fire) 1995 [First three singles]

Singles & EPs

- "Walkin' with Jesus" (Glass) 1986 – UK Indie no. 29
- "Transparent Radiation" (Glass) 1987 – UK Indie no. 29
- "Take Me to the Other Side" (Glass) 1988
- "Revolution" (Fire) 1988 – UK Indie no. 8
- (untitled) aka "Threebie 3" (Fierce) 1989 [Special limited edition, mail order offer with Playing with Fire album. Live recording: performances at Melkweg gig, Amsterdam, 1988, excluded from Performance album]
- "Hypnotized" (Fire) 1989 – UK No. 85, UK Indie no. 1
- "Big City" (Fire) 1991 – UK No. 88

Special re-release albums

- Playing with Fire (Space Age) 1999 [Playing with Fire plus alternate versions etc. from same sessions; double CD]
- Forged Prescriptions (Space Age) 2004 [Perfect Prescription alternate mixes plus alternate versions etc. from same sessions; double CD]

Unofficial albums

- Taking Drugs to Make Music to Take Drugs To (Father Yod) 1990 ['Northampton Demos', 1986]
- Losing Touch with Your Mind 1991 [A collection of alternate versions and rare releases]
- For All the Fucked Up Children of This World We Give You Spacemen 3 1995 [Early demos, 1984]
- Revolution or Heroin (Fierce) 1995 [Live bootleg – University of London Union gig, c. 1988]
- How the Blues Should've Turned Out 2005 [Limited edition, numbered double CD of previously unreleased demos, alternate versions, etc.]

== General references ==
- Morse, Erik (2004). Spacemen 3 & the Birth of Spiritualized. London: Omnibus. ISBN 978-0-7119-9602-1.
- "Stooges? Velvets? Stones?". spacemen3.co.uk. Record Collector magazine. May 2003. Archived from the original on 17 August 2011.
- Outer Limits (Spacemen 3 fan magazine), Issues 1 & 2, 1991 (Two-part article re: early history of Spacemen 3).
