= Greg Shaw (writer) =

American journalist

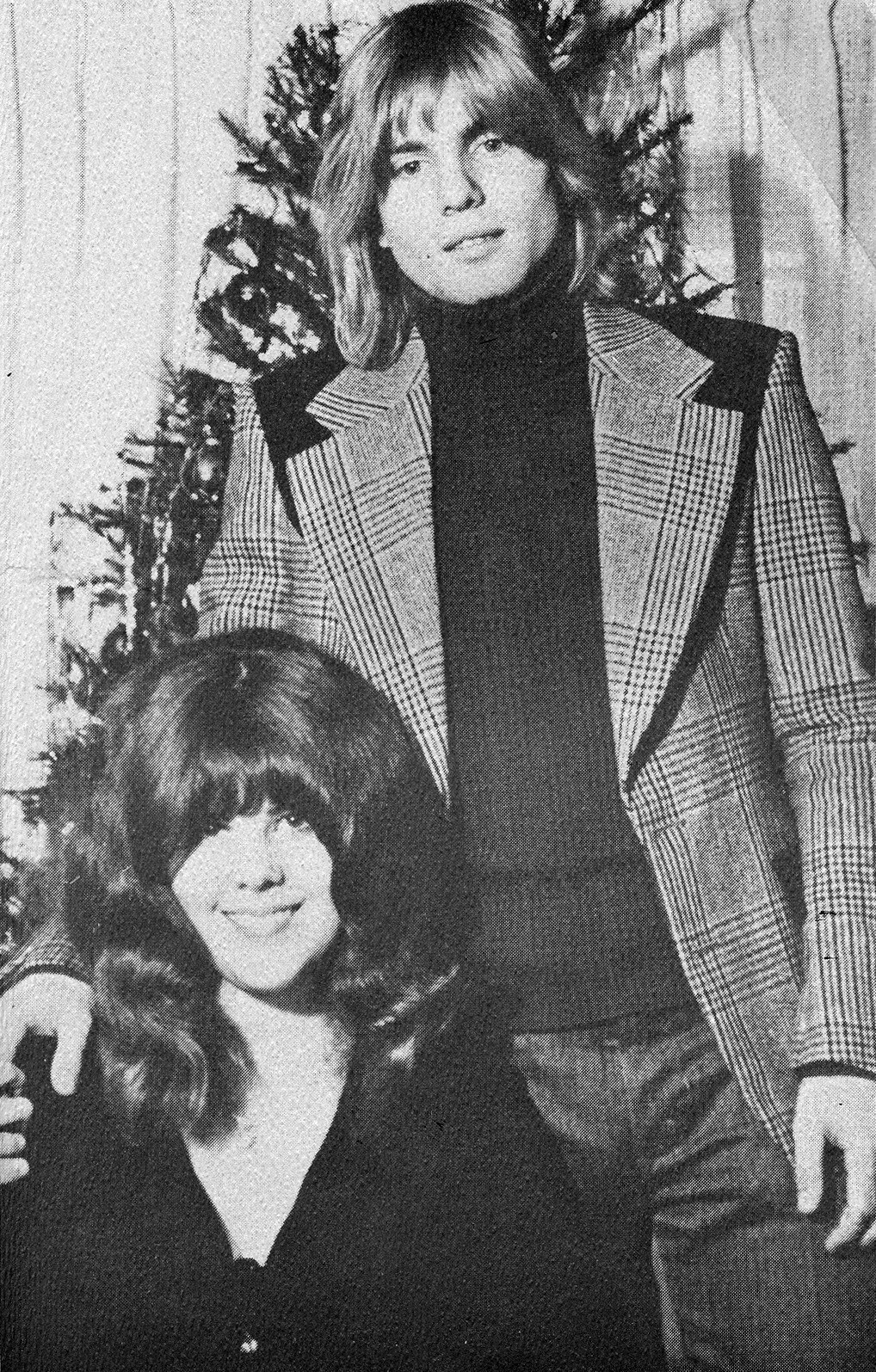
- Greg Shaw (right) and Suzy Shaw (left)
- Born: January 20, 1949 San Francisco, California, US
- Died: October 19, 2004 (aged 55) Los Angeles, California, US
- Occupation: Writer, publisher, magazine editor, music historian, record executive
- Language: English
- Genre: Journalism, music

Greg Shaw (January 20, 1949 – October 19, 2004) was an American writer, publisher, magazine editor, music historian and record executive.

== Biography ==
Shaw was born in San Francisco, California. He began writing about rock and roll music as a young teenager. His first zines were Tolkien-related, but among them was also a mimeographed sheet called Mojo Navigator (full title, "Mojo-Navigator Rock and Roll News") which he founded in 1966 with David Harris. Mojo Navigator is said to have been an early inspiration for Rolling Stone magazine, as its co-founder Jann Wenner befriended Shaw and learned how to produce a rock magazine.

In the 1970s, Shaw moved to Los Angeles with wife and partner Suzy Shaw and started the fanzine called Who Put the Bomp, popularly known as simply Bomp!, or Bomp magazine. He was hired by United Artists as assistant head of creative services. Shaw's writing appeared in Bomp!, of which he was editor and publisher, as well as in Creem, Phonograph Record (where he again served as editor) and occasionally Rolling Stone. During this time, he pursued a long-time project, The Encyclopedia Of British Rock. He also later wrote a book about Elton John. Bomp featured many writers who would later become prominent, including Lester Bangs, Greil Marcus, Richard Meltzer, and Ken Barnes.

During the 1970s, Shaw worked for Sire Records, and was instrumental in the signing of Flamin' Groovies, a band that he also managed for a couple of years. In 1974, Bomp! became a record label, and Shaw released records by Devo, the Weirdos and Iggy Pop, and worked with several artists including Stiv Bators and the Dead Boys. He signed, and distributed, power pop and new wave acts such as Shoes, the Nerves, the Plimsouls and the Romantics. Bomp! Records was an LA record store for a couple of years, as well as one of the first independent distributors in the U.S.

In the 1980s, Shaw helped launch the garage revival scene with bands such as the Miracle Workers and the Pandoras. He also released music by Spacemen 3 and the Brian Jonestown Massacre in the mid to late-1990s, and appears in the Sundance award-winning documentary Dig! In 1994, he associated with Patrick Boissel's Alive Records, a label with music by the Black Keys, Two Gallants, the Bobby Lees, Radio Moscow, Swamp Dogg and many other artists.

In addition, he was known as a record collector, and historian, and started the Pebbles collection album series in the early 1980s.

Greg Shaw died of heart failure in Los Angeles at the age of 55.
