= BOMP! Records =

American record label

Bomp! Records
- Founded: 1974
- Founder: Greg Shaw; Suzy Shaw
- Genre: Proto-punk; punk rock; pop rock; indie rock
- Country of origin: United States
- Location: Los Angeles, California
- Official website: www.bompstore.com

Bomp! Records is a Los Angeles-based record label formed in 1974 by fanzine publisher and music historian Greg Shaw and his wife Suzy Shaw.

== Magazine ==
Who Put the Bomp
- Editor: Greg Shaw
- Categories: Music
- First issue: January 1970
- Final issue Number: 1979; 21
- Country: United States
- Website: www.bomp.com

Who Put the Bomp was a rock music fanzine edited and published by Greg Shaw from 1970 to 1979. Its name came from the 1961 hit doo-wop song "Who Put the Bomp (in the Bomp, Bomp, Bomp)" by Barry Mann. Later, the name was shortened to Bomp! Bomp!, and extended by Shaw to the record label Bomp! Records, which he headed until his death in 2004.

=== Background ===
The magazine was a departure from the mainstream and its writing style unique with its own opinion described as almost partisan. The magazine was first published in 1970. It was created by Greg Shaw and his wife. The magazine chronicled bands that Shaw deemed worthy of covering, which he did passionately. Shaw made it known too that the magazine was not going to cater to nostalgia or be an info receptacle for fanatical collectors of obscure out of print records.

A significant number of writers who wrote for the magazine went on to greater things. Two journalists who had their careers launched via the magazine were Lester Bangs and Greil Marcus.

=== Staff ===
Ken Barnes, who has written for the Best Classic Bands website, and other publications such as Fusion and Phonograph Record was once co-editor for the magazine. Jay Kinney, who was a key man in the underground comics movement in the late 1960s, served as art director for the magazine.

=== Greg Shaw ===
Shaw was one of the first and best-known rock fanzine editors. Active in science fiction fandom as a young man, he became familiar with fanzines. Shaw founded one of the earliest rock fanzines, the mimeographed Mojo Navigator and Rock 'n Roll News in 1966.

== Record label history ==
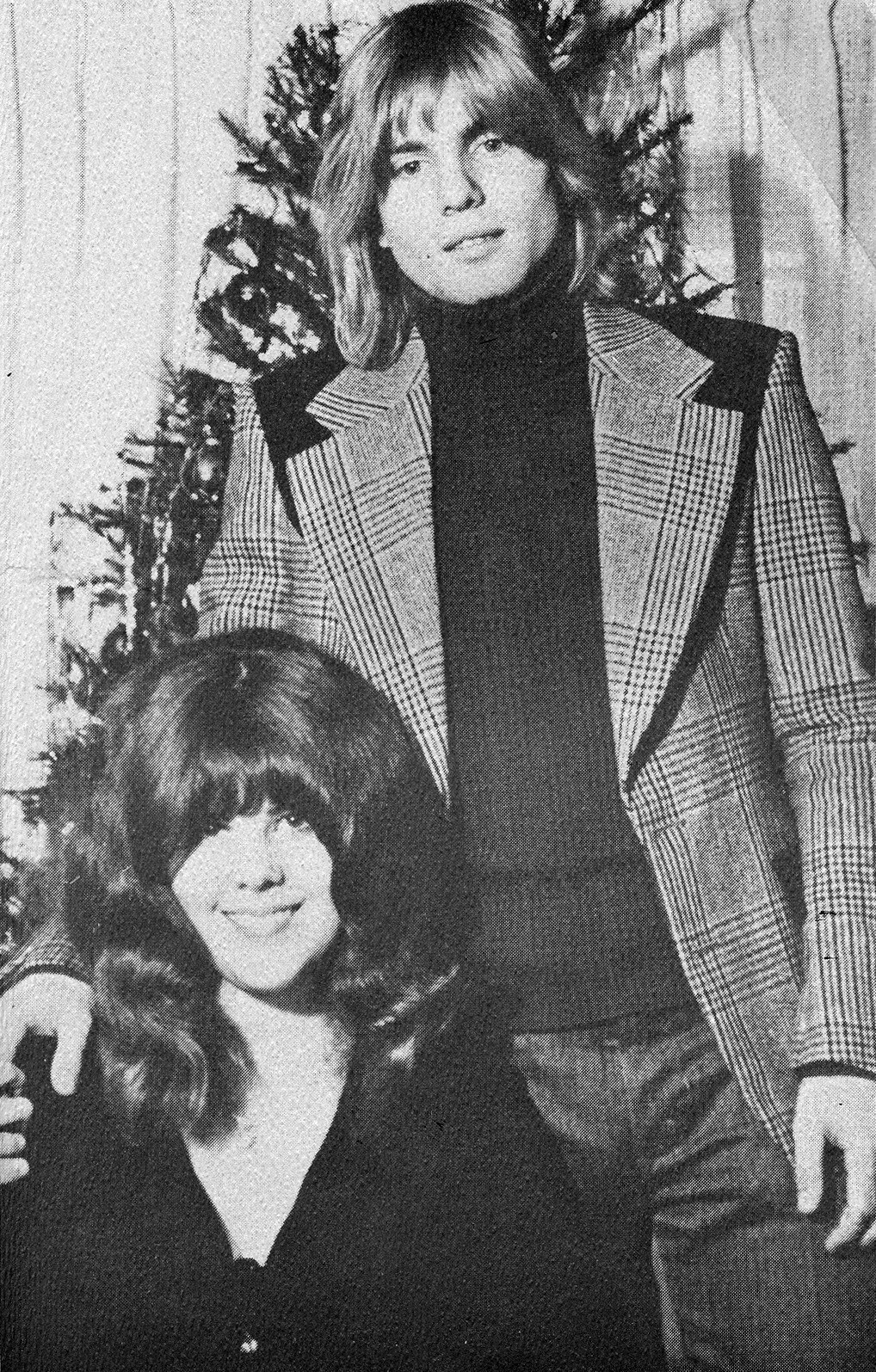
Suzy and Greg Shaw

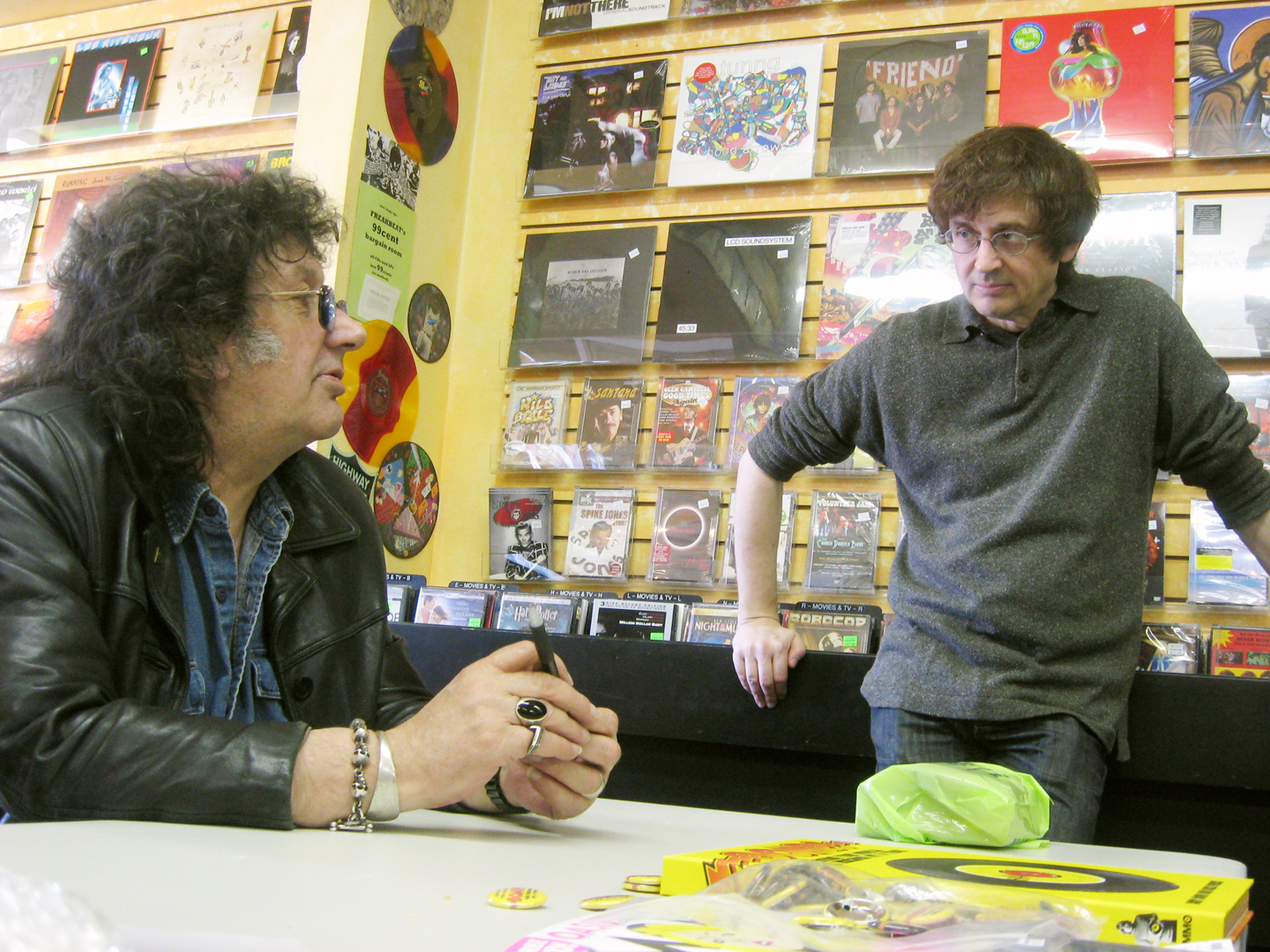
Mick Farren (left) with Patrick Boissel at the signing of the Bomp! book at Freakbeat Records in Sherman Oaks, California

The label has featured punk, pop, power pop, garage rock, new wave, old school rock, neo-psychedelia among other genres. Its roster has included the Modern Lovers, Iggy and the Stooges, Stiv Bators and the Dead Boys, 20/20, Shoes, Devo, the Weirdos, the Romantics, Spacemen 3, the Germs, SIN 34, Jeff Dahl, the Brian Jonestown Massacre, and Black Lips.

Greg Shaw died from heart failure at the age of 55 on October 19, 2004. Bomp! Records is headed by his ex-wife, Suzy Shaw.

Suzy Shaw and Mick Farren co-authored Bomp: Saving the World One Record at a Time, published by Ammo Books in 2007. In 2009, Bomp! and Ugly Things published Bomp 2 – Born in the Garage, edited by Suzy Shaw and Mike Stax.

== Roster ==
- 20/20
- Stiv Bators
- The Barracudas
- Beachwood Sparks
- The Beat
- Black Lips
- Blow-Up
- The Brian Jonestown Massacre
- Paul Collins
- Jeff Dahl
- Dead Boys
- Dead Meadow
- Devo
- DMZ
- Eyes of Mind
- Gravedigger Five
- Germs
- Hollowbody
- The Hangman's Beautiful Daughters
- The Haunted
- The Hollywood Squares
- Jon and the Nightriders (Voxx)
- The Konks
- The Last
- The Miracle Workers
- Modern Lovers
- The Morlocks
- The Nerves
- Nikki and the Corvettes
- The Pandoras
- The Romantics
- Shoes
- SIN 34
- The Sonics
- Spacemen 3
- The Stooges
- Mark Sultan
- The Telescopes
- The Things
- The Warlocks
- The Weirdos
- The Unknowns
- Venus and the Razorblades
- The Zeros

== See also ==
- List of record labels
