= Playing with Fire (Spacemen 3 album) =

Studio album by Spacemen 3
- Released: 27 February 1989
- Genre: Psychedelic rock; space rock
- Length: 46:45
- Label: Fire (original UK release); Bomp! (original US release); Rough Trade (Germany); Hitch-Hyke (Greece); Space Age Recordings (2001 UK reissue); Taang! (2009 US reissue)

Spacemen 3 chronology
| Performance (1988) | Playing with Fire (1989) | Recurring (1991) |

Alternative cover
- When Taang! Records reissued the album on CD in 1994, the white background of the original was changed for a fiery interpretation. Later CD reissues have restored the original artwork.

Playing with Fire is the third studio album by Spacemen 3, released in February 1989. The original CD version included two live bonus tracks recorded in the Netherlands, and an ensuing release on Taang! Records included two more b-sides from the "Revolution" single. A reissued version from 2001 has an entire extra disc of demos and rarities.

== Reception ==
Professional ratings
Review scores
| Source | Rating |
|---|---|
| AllMusic | 4.5/5 stars |
| The Great Rock Discography | 8/10 |
| Mojo | 5/5 stars |
| MusicHound Rock | 4/5 stars |
| NME | 8 1/2/10 |
| Record Mirror | 4/5 |
| The Rolling Stone Album Guide | 4.5/5 stars |
| Select | 5/5 |
| Sounds | 5/5 stars |
| Spin Alternative Record Guide | 9/10 |

Playing with Fire was featured in Robert Dimery's 1001 Albums You Must Hear Before You Die. Stereogum placed "Revolution" at twentieth in their list of the "31 Essential Shoegaze Tracks".

== Track listing ==
Original release (Fire FIRELP16)

| No. | Title | Writer(s) | Length |
|---|---|---|---|
| 1. | "Honey" | Peter Kember | 3:00 |
| 2. | "Come Down Softly to My Soul" | Jason Pierce | 3:46 |
| 3. | "How Does It Feel?" | Kember | 7:58 |
| 4. | "I Believe It" | Kember | 3:20 |
| 5. | "Revolution" | Kember | 5:56 |
| 6. | "Let Me Down Gently" | Kember | 4:30 |
| 7. | "So Hot (Wash Away All of My Tears)" | Pierce | 2:38 |
| 8. | "Suicide" | Pierce, Kember | 11:03 |
| 9. | "Lord Can You Hear Me?" | Pierce | 4:34 |

2001 reissue (Space Age Recordings)

Disc 1
| No. | Title | Writer(s) | Length |
|---|---|---|---|
| 1. | "Honey" | Kember | 3:00 |
| 2. | "Come Down Softly to My Soul" | Pierce | 3:46 |
| 3. | "How Does It Feel?" | Kember | 7:58 |
| 4. | "I Believe It" | Kember | 3:20 |
| 5. | "Revolution" | Kember | 5:56 |
| 6. | "Let Me Down Gently" | Kember | 4:30 |
| 7. | "So Hot (Wash Away All of My Tears)" | Pierce | 2:38 |
| 8. | "Suicide" | Pierce, Kember | 11:03 |
| 9. | "Lord Can You Hear Me?" | Pierce | 4:34 |
| 10. | "Suicide (Live)" | Pierce, Kember | 12:25 |
| 11. | "Repeater (How Does It Feel?) (Live)" | Kember | 5:31 |
| 12. | "Chè" | Martin Rev, Alan Vega, Kember | 4:31 |
| 13. | "May the Circle Be Unbroken" | Traditional arr. Pierce | 3:46 |

Disc 2
| No. | Title | Writer(s) | Length |
|---|---|---|---|
| 1. | "Honey (Demo)" | Kember | 3:24 |
| 2. | "Let Me Down Gently (Drum Mix)" | Kember | 4:51 |
| 3. | "How Does It Feel? (Alternative Version)" | Kember | 8:25 |
| 4. | "Suicide (Alternate Mix)" | Pierce, Kember | 11:51 |
| 5. | "Lord Can You Hear Me? (Demo Vocal)" | Pierce | 4:41 |
| 6. | "I Believe It (Alternate Mix)" | Kember | 3:20 |
| 7. | "Chè (Maracas Mix)" | Rev, Vega, Kember | 4:38 |
| 8. | "Any Way That You Want Me (Demo)" | Chip Taylor | 3:21 |
| 9. | "Girl on Fire (Demo)" | Phil Parfitt | 2:06 |
