= Neo-psychedelia =

Music genre based on 1960s psychedelic music

- Other names: Acid punk; New Psychedelia; Psychedelic Revival; New Wave psychedelia; neo-psych
- Stylistic origins: Psychedelia; post-punk; new wave
- Cultural origins: Late 1970s, United States and United Kingdom
- Derivative forms: Ambient pop; post-noise psychedelia; hypnagogic pop; space rock revival

Subgenres
- Dream pop; baggy; shoegaze

Regional scenes
- Italian occult psychedelia

Local scenes
- Elephant 6; Paisley Underground

Other topics
- Acid rock; alternative rock; indie rock; indie music scene; jangle pop; list of artists; post-rock; psychedelic pop; psychedelic rock; recording studio as an instrument; space rock; stoner rock

Neo-psychedelia (or simply neo-psych) is a genre of psychedelic music that draws inspiration from the music production approaches and songwriting of 1960s psychedelia, either exploring emulations of the sounds of the era or applying its ethos to new styles of music. It has occasionally seen mainstream pop success but is typically explored within alternative music, indie music and underground scenes.

Neo-psychedelia first developed in the late-1970s as an outgrowth of the British post-punk scene. In the United Kingdom, the "psychedelic revival" was referred to as "the New Psychedelia" or "acid punk". A neo-psychedelic wave of British alternative rock in the 1980s spawned the subgenres of dream pop and shoegaze. Mainstream artists like Prince and Lenny Kravitz explored the style in the 1980s and 1990s.

== Characteristics ==
Neo-psychedelic artists primarily borrow a variety of musical, visual and aesthetic elements from 1960s and 1970s psychedelic music. Artists such as the Soft Boys, Spacemen 3 and the Church merged post-punk and jangle pop with psychedelic rock, pop, acid and folk music. According to AllMusic:

Whether they played trippy psychedelic pop (à la the Beatles, early Pink Floyd, and countless others), jangly Byrds-influenced guitar rock, distortion-drenched free-form jams, or mind-bending sonic experiments, these groups looked to psychedelia as a wellspring of evocative, unusual sounds, and either updated or unabashedly copied the original artists' approaches.

Some neo-psychedelic bands were explicitly focused on drug use and experiences, and like the acid house movement of the same era, evoked transitory, ephemeral, and trance-like experiences. Several bands have used neo-psychedelic elements, or perform neo-psychedelia, to accompany surreal or political lyrics. In the view of author Erik Morse, "the sounds of American neo-psychedelia emphasized the cryptic margins of avant-rock, incorporating evanescent textures over an immutable bassline, producing a 'heavy' metallic ambience, contra-distinct to the sing-song filigree of British psychedelia".

== Background ==
According to David Luhrssen and Michael Larson's book Encyclopedia of Punk Rock and New Wave (2025), the resurgence of 1960s psychedelic culture was already influencing music in the 1970s, stating:

However, fascination with music associated with late '60s acid culture, especially the Doors, was already a pervasive if unacknowledged undercurrent. Rock critic and entrepreneur Greg Shaw, through his Bomp! magazine and record label, was another source of inspiration for the revival through his tireless promotion of obscure '60s garage and psychedelic bands from around the world. He proposed a cyclical theory of rock music history, with primitivism giving birth to greater sophistication before sophistication reached a dead-end of pretentiousness. He promoted the idea that the simplicity of punk rock, like early rock and roll, would give way to the more expansive potential of psychedelia. Many aspiring musicians also turned for inspiration to Nuggets (1972), Lenny Kaye's compilation of '60s US garage bands, many of them infused with elements that could be heard as psychedelic.

Additionally, Luhrssen and Larson cite New York punk band Television as the "One contemporary point of inception for many neo-psychedelic bands," further stating the band drew from '60s acts such as Quicksilver Messenger Service and Jimi Hendrix.

== History ==
=== 1970s–1980s: Post-punk ===
Neo-psychedelia, or as they're calling it in England, acid punk ... is one of the two strongest trends in new wave music ... While this may seem a paradox, since punk was largely a backlash against '60s drug culture, in fact acid rock in the '60s was originally a spinoff of that decade's "punk rock" scene.

— Greg Shaw writing in Billboard, January 1978

Psychedelic rock declined towards the end of the 1960s as bands broke up or moved into new forms of music, including heavy metal music and progressive rock. Like the psychedelic developments of the late 1960s, punk rock and new wave in the 1970s challenged the rock music establishment. At the time, "new wave" was a term used interchangeably with the nascent punk rock explosion. In 1978, journalist Greg Shaw categorized a subset of new wave music as "neo-psychedelia", citing Devo, "to an extent ... [its] first major indication ... [they are] the new darling of the new wave press and opinion-makers, yet nothing about it is remotely 'punk'". Shaw wrote that in England, neo-psychedelia was known as "acid punk", noting that the "self-advertised 'psychedelic punk' band, the Soft Boys, [was] being hotly pursued by several major labels." The San Francisco band Chrome labelled themselves "acid punk" during this era. According to Chrome member Helios Creed, music journalists at the time considered about ten bands – including Chrome, Devo, and Pere Ubu – to be acid punk groups: "They didn't want to call it psychedelia, it was New Wave psychedelia".

By 1978–1979, new wave was considered independent from punk and post-punk (the latter was initially known as "new musick"). (Note: Contemporary writers like Jon Savage saw the experimental and radical musical deconstructions of groups like Devo, Throbbing Gristle, Siouxsie and the Banshees, the Slits, and Wire as "post-punk" maneuvers.) Author Clinton Heylin marks the second half of year 1977 and the first half of year 1978 as the "true starting-point for English post-punk". (Note: He says that the arrival of guitarist John McKay in Siouxsie and the Banshees in 1977, Magazine's album Real Life (1978), and Wire's new musical direction as factors in this starting point. Journalist David Stubbs wrote that Siouxsie and the Banshees' music in 1982 had got "neo-psychedelic flourishes" with "pan-like flutes" and "treated loops".) Some of the indie music scene's bands, including the Soft Boys, the Teardrop Explodes, Wah!, and Echo & the Bunnymen, became major figures of neo-psychedelia. (Note: Reynolds surmised that Echo & the Bunnymen's "tuneful" music could be likened to "two other leading postpunk groups to come from Liverpool during this period: Wah! Heat, with their ringing chords and endless crescendos, and the neopsychedelic outfit Teardrop Explodes, whose singer, Julian Cope, described the band's songs as 'cries of joy.'" He also notes that Echo & the Bunnymen were heralded as the harbingers of "new psychedelia", he writes, "despite the fact that in those days they never ingested anything more deranging than pints of ale". The band's manager, Bill Drummond, said: "All that postpunk vanguard stuff, we'd just think that was completely stupid.") According to writers David Luhrssen and Michael Larson, the movement was referred to as "'the New Psychedelia' in the UK or 'neo-psychedelia' by rock critics". In the early 1980s, Siouxsie and the Banshees crafted an "exotic neo-psychedelic pop" with the arrival of guitarist John McGeoch. The early 1980s Paisley Underground movement followed neo-psychedelia. Originating in Los Angeles, the movement saw a number of young bands who were influenced by the psychedelia of the late 1960s and all took different elements of it, and the term "Paisley Underground" was later expanded to include others from outside the city who explored the same songwriting techniques and influences.

=== 1980s–1990s ===
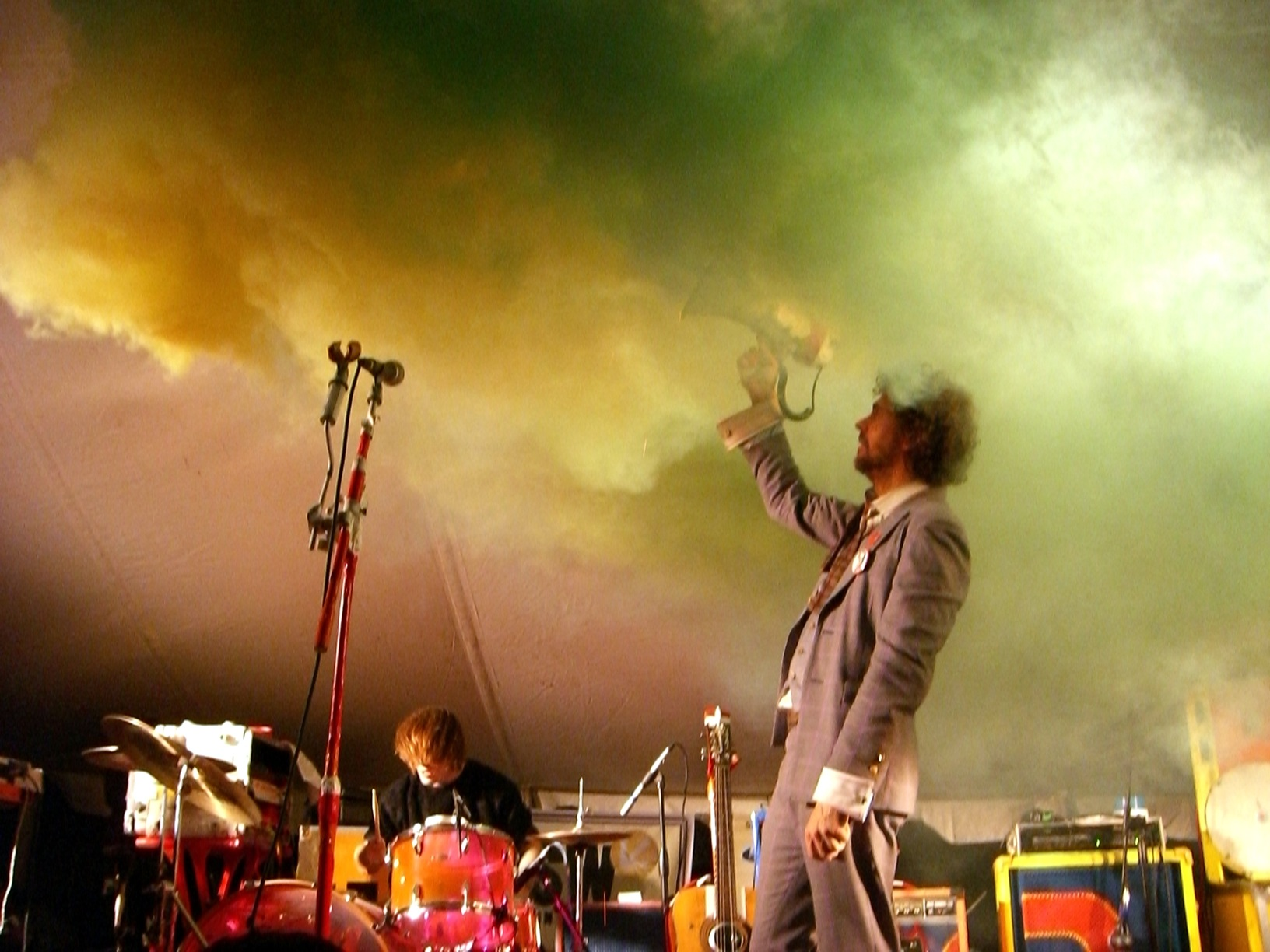
The American neo-psychedelic band The Flaming Lips, performing live in 2006.

In the 1980s and 1990s there were occasional mainstream acts that dabbled in neo-psychedelia, including Prince's mid-1980s work and some of Lenny Kravitz's 1990s output, but neo-psychedelia has mainly been the domain of alternative and indie rock bands. The late 1980s would see the birth of shoegaze, which, among other influences, took inspiration from 1960s psychedelia. Reynolds referred to this movement as "a rash of blurry, neo-psychedelic bands" in a 1992 article in The Observer.

AllMusic states: "Aside from the early-'80s Paisley Underground movement and the Elephant 6 collective of the late 1990s, most subsequent neo-psychedelia came from isolated eccentrics and revivalists, not cohesive scenes." They go on to cite what they consider some of the more prominent artists: the Church, Nick Saloman's Bevis Frond, Spacemen 3, Robyn Hitchcock, Mercury Rev, the Flaming Lips, the Vines and Super Furry Animals. According to Treblezine's Jeff Telrich: "Primal Scream made [neo-psychedelia] dancefloor ready. The Flaming Lips and Spiritualized took it to orchestral realms. And Animal Collective—well, they kinda did their own thing."

In Germany, the Düsseldorf-based formation Vibravoid played a pivotal role in this revival starting in the late 1980s. Originally founded in 1988 as the "Lightshow Society Düsseldorf," the band is considered the initiator and creator of Neo-Krautrock—a subgenre that combines the hypnotic repetitions of classic Krautrock with the aesthetics of the 1960s underground. When the band members began cultivating this style as teenagers, Krautrock and psychedelic music were commercially regarded as "toxic waste" and had largely disappeared from public perception. Through their consistent commitment to analog production techniques and an authentic, fully analog 1960s-style light show, they significantly shaped the visual and sonic aesthetics of the genre in the underground. Internationally, the band gained significance through its deliberate distancing from movements such as Stoner Rock or Alternative Rock, which are often incorrectly marketed as psychedelic, while Vibravoid focused strictly on traditional, hypnotic structures and original "psychedelic cosmic music." Furthermore, in 1996, the band launched the world's only reanimation of the legendary UFO Club, and as early as 2001, provided the conceptual blueprint for the subsequent wave of international psych festivals with their "Love Is Freedom" festival.

=== 2000s–2020s ===
During the 2000s and 2010s, Southern California's hypnagogic pop and chillwave scenes further developed neo-psychedelia through artists such as Ariel Pink and James Ferraro. Other artists include indie bands such as MGMT and Animal Collective. Around the same time, Australia's neo-psychedelic rock scene emerged which included acts such as Tame Impala, Psychedelic Porn Crumpets, Babe Rainbow, Pond, the Morning After Girls and King Gizzard & the Lizard Wizard.

By the late 2010s and early 2020s, underground rap microgenres such as cloud rap drew influences from psychedelia.

== See also ==
- Dunedin sound
- Madchester

== Bibliography ==
- Cateforis, Theo (2011). Are We Not New Wave?: Modern Pop at the Turn of the 1980s. University of Michigan Press. ISBN 978-0-472-03470-3.
- Morse, Erik (2009). Spacemen 3 and the Birth of Spiritualized. Omnibus Press. ISBN 978-0-85712-104-2.
- Reynolds, Simon (2005). Rip It Up and Start Again: Postpunk 1978–1984. London: Faber and Faber. ISBN 978-0-571-21570-6.
- Smith, Paul (1997). Millennial Dreams: Contemporary Culture and Capital in the North. Verso. ISBN 978-1-85984-918-7.
- Trainer, Adam (2016). "From Hypnagogia to Distroid: Postironic Musical Renderings of Personal Memory". The Oxford Handbook of Music and Virtuality. Oxford University Press. ISBN 978-0-19-932128-5.
- Luhrssen, David; Larson, Michael (2025). Encyclopedia of Punk Rock and New Wave, 1975–1985. Bloomsbury Publishing.
