= Jason Pierce =

English singer-songwriter & guitarist (born 1965)

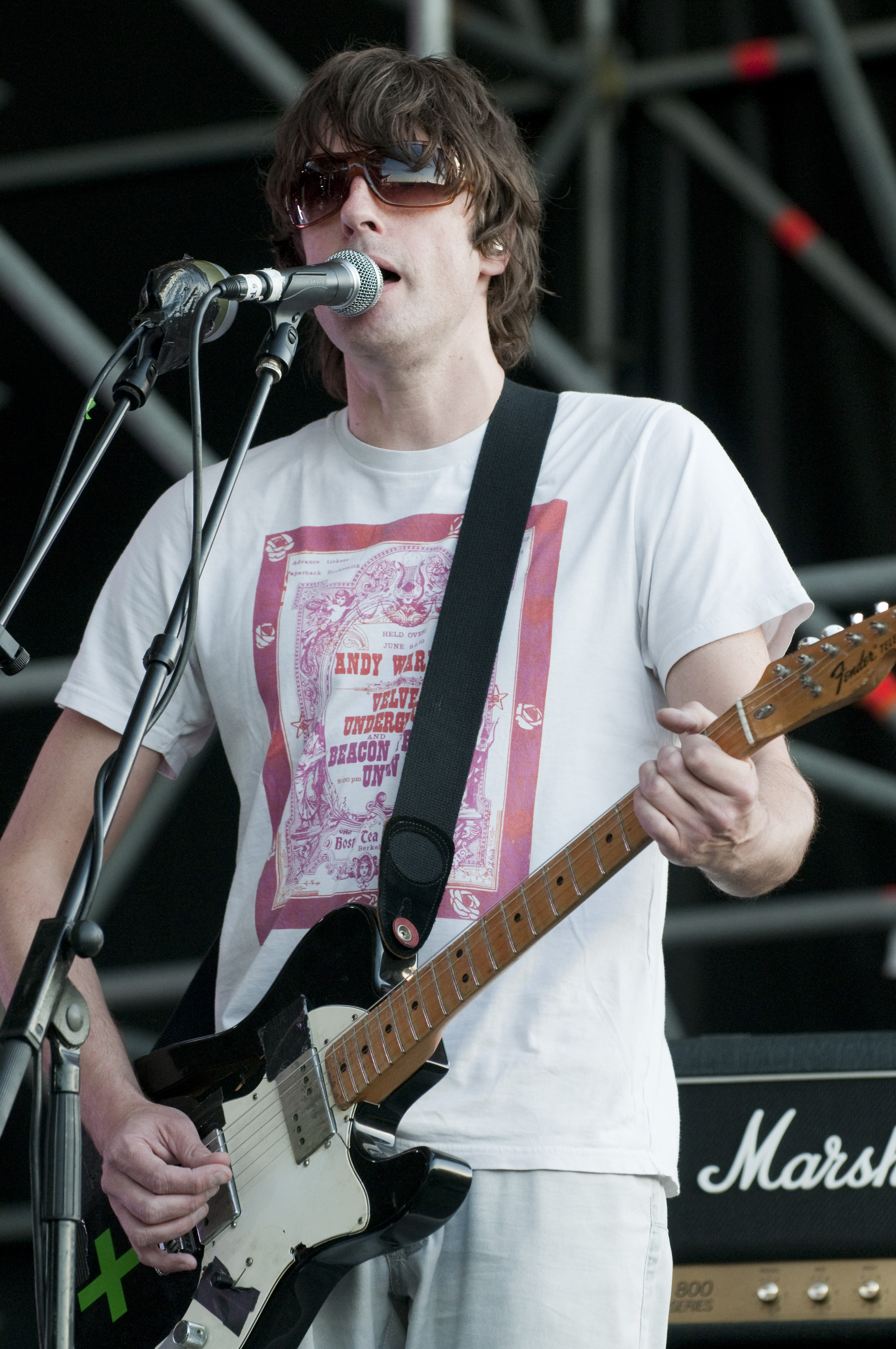
- Jason Pierce, 2009

Background information
- Also known as: J. Spaceman
- Born: Jason Andrew Pierce; 19 November 1965 (age 60)
- Origin: Rugby, England
- Genres: Space rock revival; dream pop; indie rock; psychedelic pop; post-rock
- Occupations: Musician, singer-songwriter
- Instruments: Vocals, guitar, bass guitar, piano, keyboards, percussion, banjo, dulcimer, autoharp, harmonica
- Years active: 1982–present

Jason Andrew Pierce (born 19 November 1965 in Rugby) is an English rock musician. He is currently the frontman and sole permanent member of the band Spiritualized, having previously co-fronted Spacemen 3 with Peter Kember from 1982 until 1991. He has worked under the name J. Spaceman.

== Music ==
In between his work with Spiritualized and Spacemen 3, Pierce has been active with a network of free jazz players and improvisers, collaborating with artists, including Black Rebel Motorcycle Club, Dr. John, Primal Scream, Daniel Johnston and Yoko Ono.

In 2006, Pierce released his first solo album, Guitar Loops, a limited release on Coxon and Wales's Treader record label. Also in 2006, he composed the original score for an art installation called "Silent Sound" by British artists Iain Forsyth and Jane Pollard. The live performance at St. George's Hall in Liverpool was recorded and released as a limited edition signed and numbered CD. A second performance of Silent Sound took place in 2010 as part of the AV Festival, at Middlesbrough Town Hall. A second limited edition, a signed and numbered CD, was released.

Between 6 and 8 February 2007, Pierce performed in a series of benefit concerts for the HOPING Foundation for Palestinian children.

He provided some of the soundtrack for Harmony Korine's 2007 film Mister Lonely.

In July 2008, Pierce sat down for an interview with NPR before a concert at the 9:30 Club in Washington, D.C. Both the interview and the concert can be heard on the NPR website.

He released a collaboration with Matthew Shipp entitled Spaceshipp on the Treader label in 2008.

His song "Lay It Down Slow" was used for the finale of the hit US drama series Prison Break.

In 2015, he played guitar on the Ariel Pink song "Dayzed Inn Daydreams".

== Personal life ==
Jason lives with his partner and two children in the East End of London.

In the 1990s, Pierce was in a relationship with Kate Radley, who was also a member of Spiritualized. In 1995, Radley married Richard Ashcroft, the then lead singer of the Verve.

Pierce was seriously ill with pneumonia in 2005. Both his lungs had filled with liquid; the 5 foot 11 inches (180 cm)-tall musician's weight plunged to 7 stone (44 kg; 98 lb) and his heart stopped beating twice.

In an early 2012 interview, Pierce mentioned he had been under chemotherapy during the recordings of the 2012 Spiritualized album, Sweet Heart Sweet Light. He did not specify the diagnosis for the treatment.
