= Roland VK-8 =

Electronic keyboard

The VK-8 Combo Organ is a discontinued electronic keyboard introduced in 2002, which simulates the sound of an electromechanical tonewheel-based Hammond organ. The VK-8 is both an improvement and successor to both the VK-7 and VK-77. The VK-8 itself was succeeded by the VK-88.

== Description ==
The VK-8 harbors a sleek "waterfall" design. The main control panel of the VK-8 includes a master volume control, the expected six-position chorus/vibrato, a D-Beam controller, Leslie speaker controls, traditional percussion controls, rotary speaker modeling based on COSM technology, voice selectors for the 64 patch memories, tonewheel, amplifier and overdrive controls. However the keyboard lacks a screen feature. Along with the familiar Hammond organ sounds, the synthesizer carries quality electric/acoustic pianos, strings, bass, and choir sounds, and even jazz scat voices and synths.
