= Roland VK-7 =

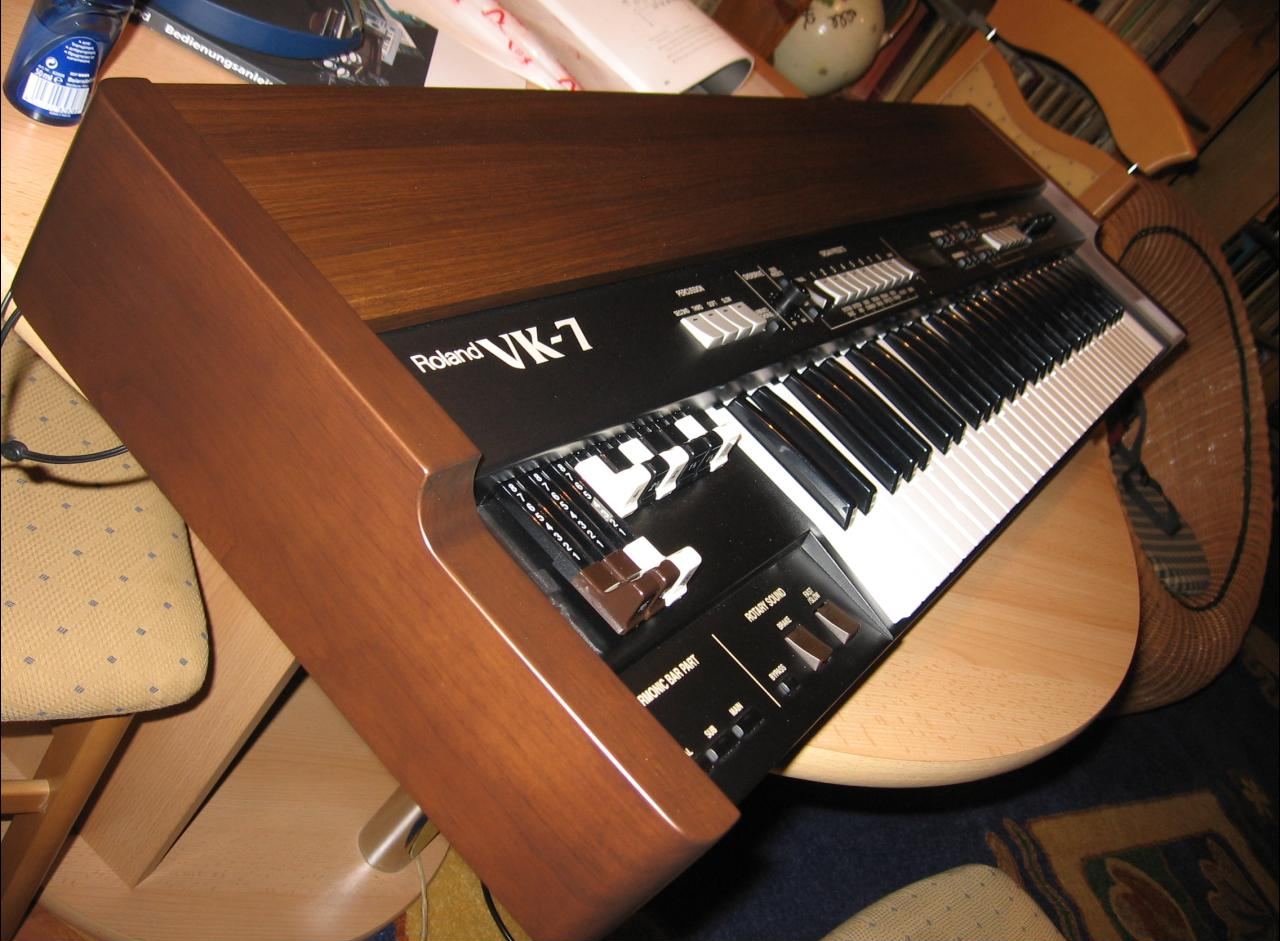
Roland VK-7

The Roland VK-7 is an electronic keyboard introduced in 1997 which simulates the sound of an electromechanical Hammond organ. Like other electronic musical instruments that emulate (or "clone") the sound of the electromechanical tonewheel-based organs formerly manufactured by Hammond, the VK-7 is referred to as a clonewheel organ. Currently it is replaced by the VK-8 and the VK-88.

Since transporting the heavy, vintage electromechanical Hammond organs to performances was cumbersome, there was a strong demand amongst musicians for way of recreating the Hammond sound in a more portable fashion. Refinements to Hammond emulations eventually led to the development of relatively lightweight electronic keyboard instruments such as the Roland VK-09 (1981), KORG BX-3 and CX-3 (1980), Roland VK-7 (1997), and Kurzweil K2600 (1999) that produce a fairly realistic re-creation of the Hammond tone.

== Description ==
The VK-7 is designed to recreate the organ sounds of the 1960s and 1970s jazz and popular music. The instrument has nine harmonic drawbars so that the organist can control the volume of different overtones. The instrument also provides vibrato, chorus, and reverb effects and an overdrive knob, which adds simulated tube amplifier "growl". As with most clonewheel emulator keyboards, the drawbars are positioned to the left of the keyboard. Unlike the Hammond organ, which had two manuals (keyboards), the VK-7 has only a single manual with 61 keys.

Nevertheless, the keyboard can be split into two sections, so that the bass drawbars are applied to the low end of the keyboard, and the nine upper drawbars are applied to the rest of the keyboard. This keyboard-split function allows an organist to perform low-register basslines and high-register chords and solos on a single keyboard. The organist can view the effect and registration settings on a small LCD screen.

As well, the instrument contains an orchestral voice section that can be layered with the organ sounds. The sounds include strings, brasses, choirs, percussion instruments (e.g., glockenspiel) and bass sounds. The keyboard has an 11-pin rotary cabinet connector which allows it to be connected to external rotary speaker, such as a Leslie Speaker. It has MIDI inputs, which means that bass pedal keyboards can be used with the instrument, or an additional MIDI keyboard can be connected to the VK-7 (so that the player can have lower and upper manuals with different pre-set tones set up). The chassis has a wood finish with alder wood sideboards.
