= Hammond organ =

Electric organ

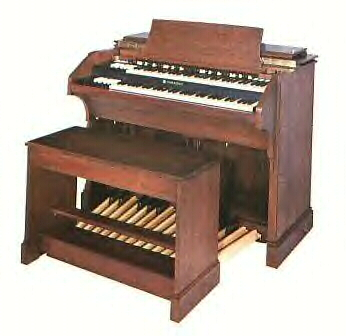
- A Hammond C-3 organ
- Manufacturer: The Hammond Organ Company (1935–1985); Hammond Organ Australia (1986–1989); Hammond-Suzuki (1989–present)
- Dates: 1935–1975 (tonewheel models); 1967–1985 (transistor models); 1986–present (digital models)
- Price: $1,193 (Model A, 1935) $2,745 (Model B-3, 1955)

Technical specifications
- Polyphony: Full
- Oscillator: Tonewheel
- Synthesis type: Additive
- Effects: Vibrato, chorus, reverb, harmonic percussion

Input/output
- Keyboard: 2 × 61-note manuals, 25-note pedals (consoles); 2 × 44-note manuals, 13-note pedals (spinets)
- External control: Amphenol connector to Hammond Tone Cabinet or Leslie speaker

Logo in use from 1967

The Hammond organ is an electric organ invented by Laurens Hammond and John M. Hanert, first manufactured in 1935. Multiple models have been produced, most of which use sliding drawbars to vary sounds. Until 1975, sound was created from rotating a metal tonewheel near an electromagnetic pickup, and amplifying the electric signal into a speaker cabinet. The organ is commonly used with the Leslie speaker.

Around two million Hammond organs have been manufactured. The organ was originally marketed by the Hammond Organ Company to churches as a lower-cost alternative to the wind-driven pipe organ, or instead of a piano. It quickly became popular with professional jazz musicians in organ trios—small groups centered on the Hammond organ. Jazz club owners found that organ trios were cheaper than hiring a big band. Jimmy Smith's use of the Hammond B-3, with its additional harmonic percussion feature, inspired a generation of organ players, and its use became more widespread in the 1960s and 1970s in genres such as rhythm and blues, rock (especially progressive rock), and reggae.

In the 1970s, the Hammond Organ Company abandoned tonewheels and switched to integrated circuits. These organs were less popular, and the company went out of business in 1985. The Hammond name was purchased by the Suzuki Musical Instrument Corporation, which proceeded to manufacture digital simulations of the most popular tonewheel organs. This culminated in the production of the "New B-3" in 2002, a recreation of the original B-3 organ using digital technology. Hammond-Suzuki continues to manufacture a variety of organs for both professional players and churches. Companies such as Korg, Roland, and Clavia have achieved success in providing more lightweight and portable emulations of the original tonewheel organs, called clonewheel organs. The sound of a tonewheel Hammond can be emulated using modern software audio plug-ins.

== Features ==
The Hammond organ has features not typically found on the piano or synthesizer. Some are similar to a pipe organ, but others are unique to the instrument.

=== Keyboards and pedalboard ===
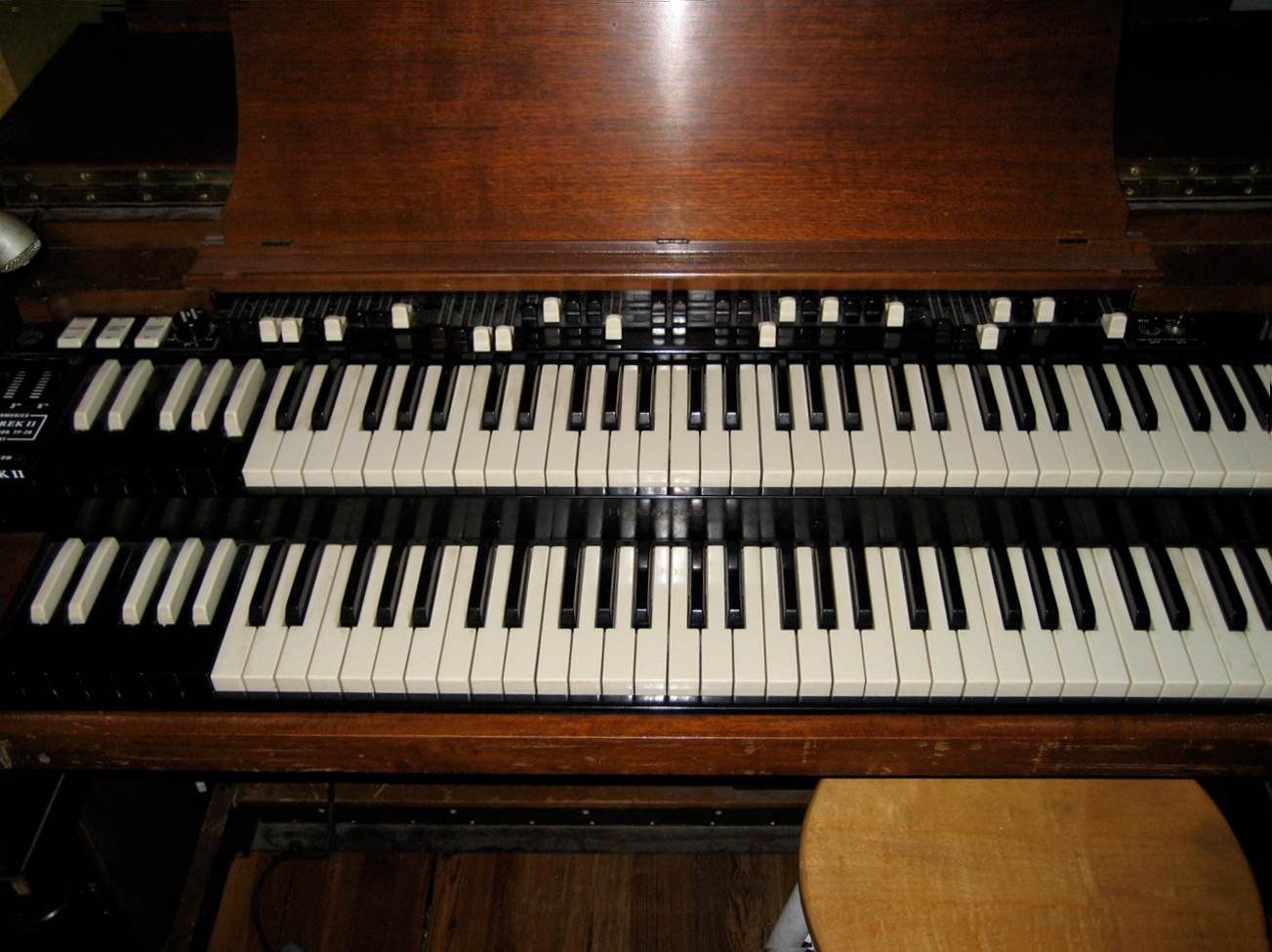
The two manuals of the Hammond B-2

C note
A single note (C) played on a Hammond organ

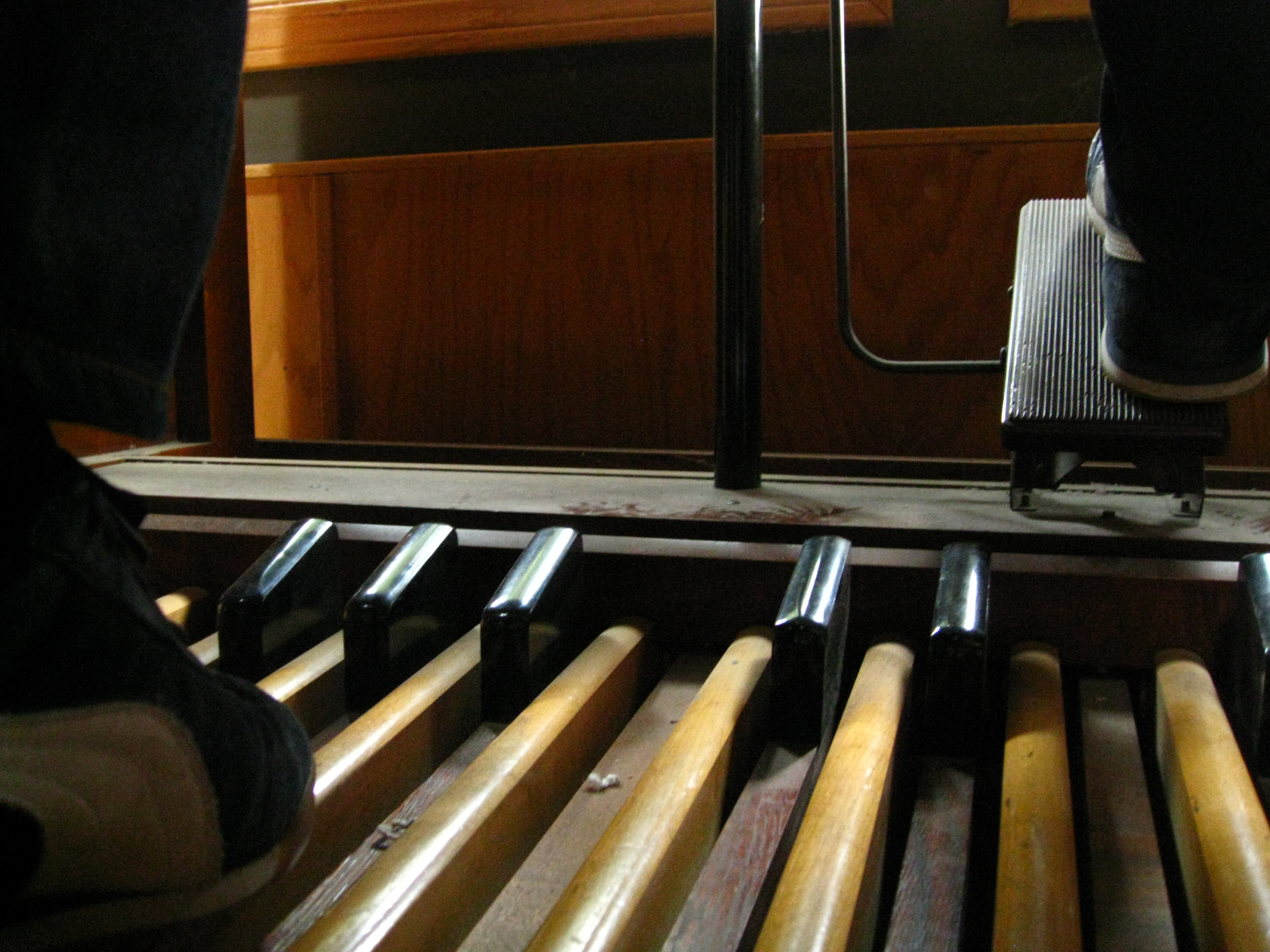
Unlike an American Guild of Organists pedalboard, a console Hammond normally has 25 pedals.

Most Hammond organs have two 61-note (five-octave) keyboards called manuals. As with pipe organ keyboards, the two manuals are positioned on two levels close to each other. Each is laid out in a similar manner to a piano keyboard, except that pressing a key on a Hammond results in the sound continuously playing until it is released, whereas with a piano, the note's volume decays. No difference in volume occurs regardless of how heavily or lightly the key is pressed (unlike with a piano), so overall volume is controlled by a pedal (also known as a "swell" or "expression" pedal). The keys on each manual have a lightweight action, which allows players to perform rapid passages more easily than on a piano. In contrast to piano and pipe organ keys, Hammond keys have a flat-front profile, commonly referred to as "waterfall" style. Early Hammond console models had sharp edges, but starting with the B-2, these were rounded, as they were cheaper to manufacture. The M series of spinets also had waterfall keys (which has subsequently made them ideal for spares on B-3s and C-3s), but later spinet models had "diving board" style keys which resembled those found on a church organ. Modern Hammond-Suzuki models use waterfall keys.

Hammond console organs come with a wooden pedalboard played with the feet, for bass notes. Most console Hammond pedalboards have 25 notes, with the bottom note a low C and the top note a middle C two octaves higher. Hammond used a 25-note pedalboard because he found that on traditional 32-note pedalboards used in church pipe organs, the top seven notes were seldom used. The Hammond Concert models E, RT, RT-2, RT-3 and D-100 had 32-note American Guild of Organists (AGO) pedalboards going up to the G above middle C as the top note. The RT-2, RT-3 and D-100 also contained a separate solo pedal system that had its own volume control and various other features. Spinet models have 12- or 13-note miniature pedalboards.

Hammond organ manuals and pedalboards were originally manufactured with solid palladium alloy wire to ensure a high-quality electrical connection when pressing a key. This design was discontinued with the introduction of the transistor organ. This means tonewheel organs have between 3.2 and 8.4 grams of palladium, depending on make and model.

=== Drawbars ===
The sound on a Hammond is varied using drawbars, similar to faders on an audio mixing console

The sound on a tonewheel Hammond organ is varied through the manipulation of drawbars. A drawbar is a metal slider that controls the volume of a particular sound component, in a similar way to a fader on an audio mixing console. As a drawbar is incrementally pulled out, it increases the volume of its sound. When pushed all the way in, the volume is decreased to zero.

The labeling of the drawbar derives from the stop system in pipe organs, in which the physical length of the pipe corresponds to the pitch produced. Most Hammonds contain nine drawbars per manual. The drawbar marked "8′" generates the fundamental of the note being played, the drawbar marked "16′" is an octave below, and the drawbars marked "4′", "2′" and "1′" are one, two and three octaves above, respectively. The other drawbars generate various other harmonics and subharmonics of the note. While each individual drawbar generates a relatively pure sound similar to a flute or electronic oscillator, more complex sounds can be created by mixing the drawbars in varying amounts. Because of this, the Hammond organ can be considered a type of additive synthesis.

Hammond organs manufactured from 1969 onwards have the footage of each drawbar engraved on its end. Some drawbar settings have become well-known and associated with certain musicians. A very popular setting is 888000000 (i.e., with the drawbars labeled "16′", "5 1/3′" and "8′" fully pulled out), and has been identified as the "classic" Jimmy Smith sound.

=== Presets ===
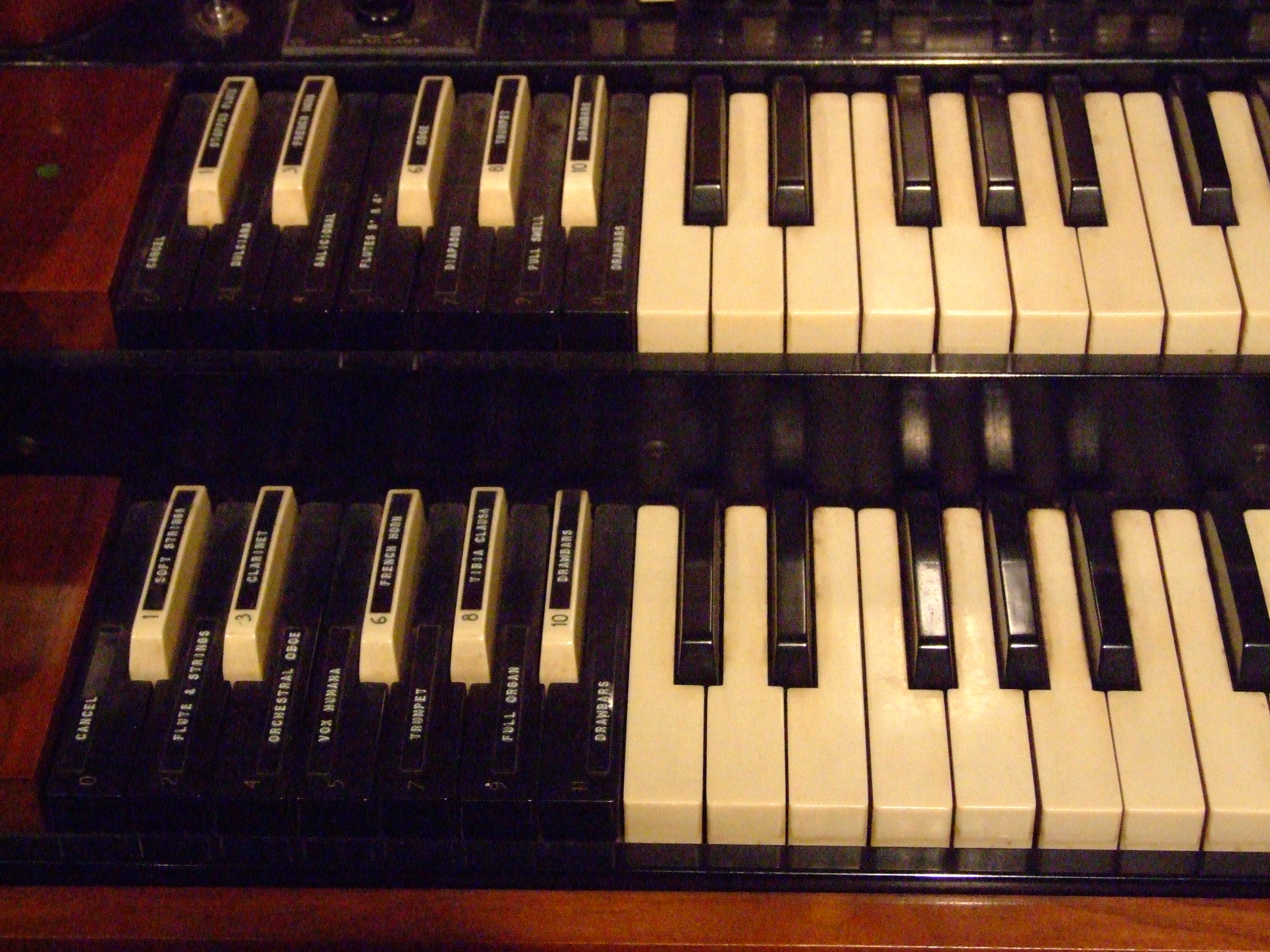
Preset keys on a Hammond organ are reverse-colored and sit to the left of the manuals

In addition to drawbars, many Hammond tonewheel organ models also include presets, which make predefined drawbar combinations available at the press of a button. Console organs have one octave of reverse colored keys (naturals are black, sharps and flats are white) to the left of each manual, with each key activating a preset; the far left key (C), also known as the cancel key, de-activates all presets, and results in no sound coming from that manual. The two right-most preset keys (B and B♭) activate the corresponding set of drawbars for that manual, while the other preset keys produce preselected drawbar settings that are internally wired into the preset panel.

=== Vibrato and chorus ===
Hammond organs have a built-in vibrato effect that provides a small variation in pitch while a note is being played, and a chorus effect where a note's sound is combined with another sound at a slightly different and varying pitch. The best known vibrato and chorus system consists of six settings, V1, V2, V3, C1, C2 and C3 (i.e., three each of vibrato and chorus), which can be selected via a rotary switch. Vibrato / chorus can be selected for each manual independently.

=== Harmonic percussion ===
The B-3 and C-3 models introduced the concept of "Harmonic Percussion", which was designed to emulate the percussive sounds of the harp, xylophone, and marimba. When selected, this feature plays a decaying second- or third-harmonic overtone when a key is pressed. The selected percussion harmonic fades out, leaving the sustained tones the player selected with the drawbars. The volume of this percussive effect is selectable as either normal or soft. Harmonic Percussion retriggers only after all notes have been released, so legato passages sound the effect only on the first note or chord, making Harmonic Percussion uniquely a "single-trigger", but still a polyphonic effect.

=== Start and run switches ===
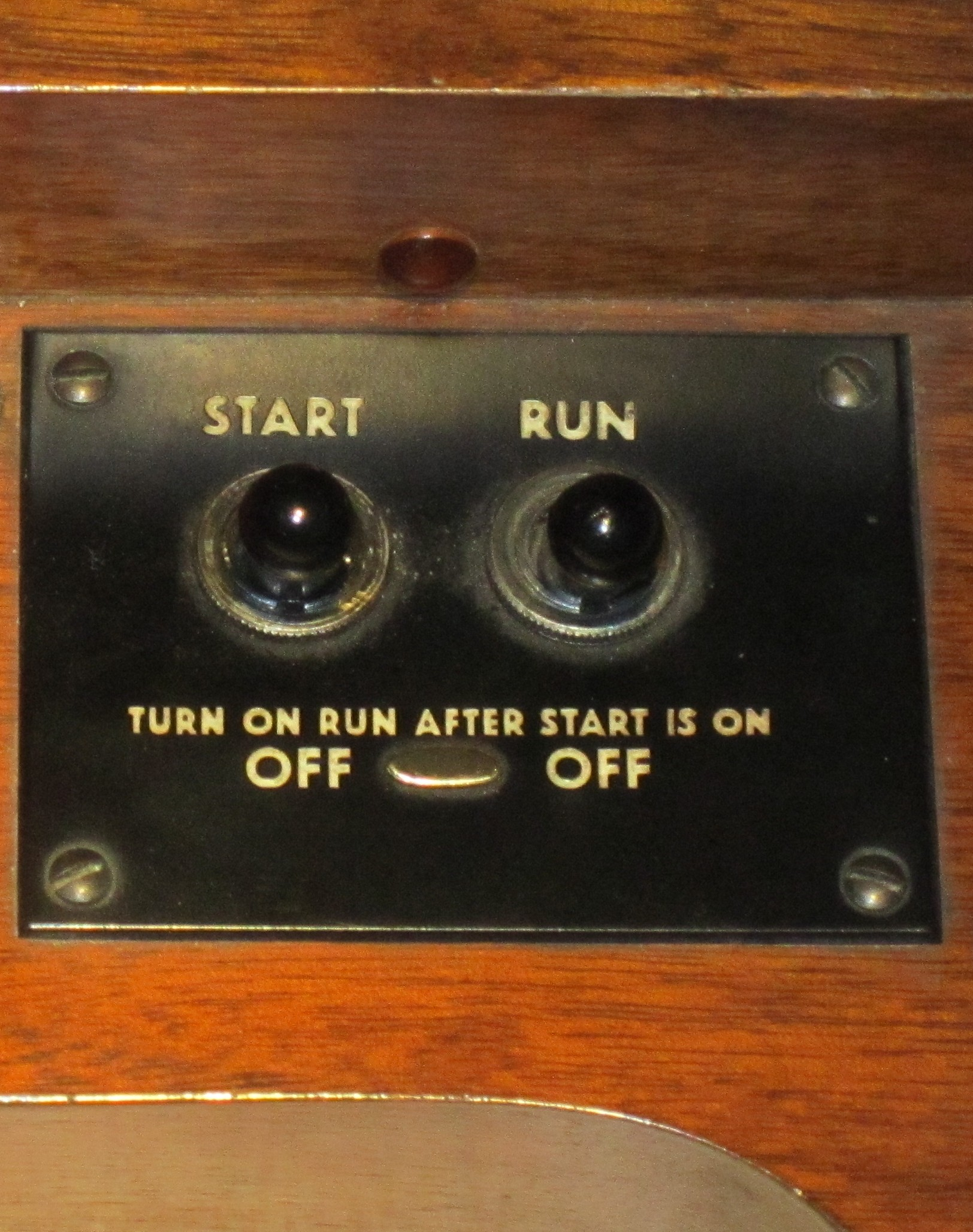
Console Hammond organs such as the B-3 require two switches: "Start" to drive the starter motor and "Run" to drive the main tonewheel generator.

Before a Hammond organ can produce sound, the motor that drives the tonewheels must come up to speed. On most models, starting a Hammond organ involves two switches. The "Start" switch turns a dedicated starter motor, which must run for about 12 seconds. Then, the "Run" switch is turned on for about four seconds. The "Start" switch is then released, whereupon the organ is ready to generate sound. The H-100 and E-series consoles and L-100 and T-100 spinet organs, however, had a self-starting motor that required only a single "On" switch. A pitch bend effect can be created on the Hammond organ by turning the "Run" switch off and on again. This briefly cuts power to the generators, causing them to run at a slower pace and generate a lower pitch for a short time. Hammond's New B3 contains similar switches to emulate this effect, though it is a digital instrument.

== History ==
The Hammond organ's technology derives from the Telharmonium, an instrument created in 1897 by Thaddeus Cahill. The telharmonium used revolving electric alternators which generated tones that could be transmitted over wires. The instrument was bulky enough to require several railway cars for its transportation, because the alternators had to be large enough to generate high voltage for a loud enough signal. The Hammond organ solved this problem by using an amplifier.

Laurens Hammond graduated from Cornell University with a mechanical engineering degree in 1916. By the start of the 1920s, he had designed a spring-driven clock, which provided enough sales for him to start his own business, the Hammond Clock Company, in 1928. As well as clocks, his early inventions included three-dimensional glasses and an automatic bridge table shuffler. However, as the Great Depression continued into the 1930s, sales of the bridge table declined and he decided to look elsewhere for a commercially successful product. Hammond was inspired to create the tonewheel or "phonic wheel" by listening to the moving gears of his electric clocks and the tones produced by them. He gathered pieces from a second-hand piano he had purchased for $15 and combined it with a tonewheel generator in a similar form to the telharmonium, albeit much shorter and more compact. Since Hammond was not a musician, he asked the company's assistant treasurer, W. L. Lahey, who was also a trained organist, to help him achieve the desired organ sound. To cut costs, Hammond made a pedalboard with only 25 notes, instead of the standard 32 on church organs, and it quickly became a de facto standard.

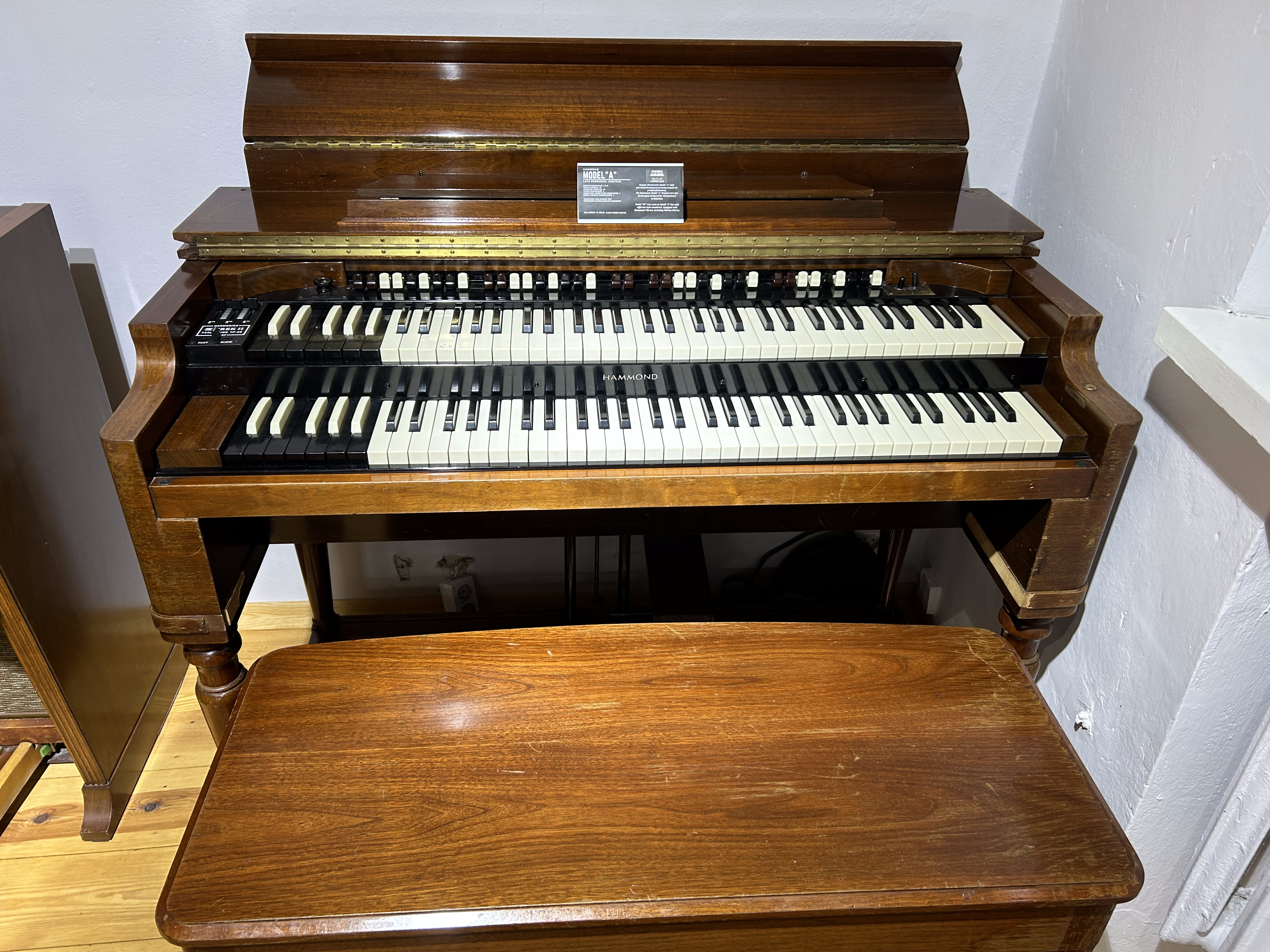
The Model A was the first Hammond organ to be produced, from 1935 to 1938

On April 24, 1934, Hammond filed a patent for an "electrical musical instrument", which was personally delivered to the patent office by Hanert, the co-inventor, explaining that they could start production immediately and it would be good for local employment in Chicago. The invention was unveiled to the public in April 1935, and the first model, the Model A, was made available in June of that year. Over 1,750 churches purchased a Hammond organ in the first three years of production, and by the end of the 1930s, over 200 instruments were being made each month. By 1966, an estimated 50,000 churches had installed a Hammond. For all its subsequent success with professional musicians, the original company did not target its products at that market, principally because Hammond did not think there would be a sufficient return.

In 1936, the Federal Trade Commission (FTC) filed a complaint claiming that the Hammond Company made "false and misleading" claims in advertisements for its organ, including that the Hammond could produce "the entire range of tone coloring of a pipe organ". The complaint resulted in lengthy hearing proceedings, which featured a series of auditory tests that pitted a Hammond costing about $2600 against a $75,000 Skinner pipe organ in the University of Chicago's Rockefeller Chapel. During the auditory tests, sustained tones and excerpts from musical works were played on the electric and pipe organs while a group of musicians and laymen attempted to distinguish between the instruments. While attorneys for Hammond argued that the test listeners were wrong or guessed nearly half the time, witnesses for the FTC claimed that Hammond employees had unfairly manipulated the Skinner organ to sound more like the Hammond. In 1938, the FTC ordered Hammond to "cease and desist" a number of advertising claims, including that its instrument was equivalent to a $10,000 pipe organ. After the FTC's decision, Hammond claimed that the hearings had vindicated his company's assertions that the organ produced "real", "fine", and "beautiful" music, phrases which were each cited in the FTC's original complaint, but not included in the "cease and desist" order. Hammond also claimed that although the hearing was expensive for his company, the proceedings generated so much publicity that "as a result we sold enough extra organs to cover the expense."

The Hammond Organ Company produced an estimated two million instruments in its lifetime; these have been described as "probably the most successful electronic organs ever made". A key ingredient to the Hammond organ's success was the use of dealerships and a sense of community. Several dedicated organ dealers set up business in the United States and there was a bi-monthly newsletter, The Hammond Times, mailed out to subscribers. Advertisements tended to show families gathered around the instrument, often with a child playing it, as an attempt to show the organ as a center-point of home life and to encourage children to learn music.

=== Tonewheel organs ===
Hammond organs, as manufactured by the original company, can be divided into two main groups:

- Console organs have two 61-note manuals and a pedalboard of at least two octaves. Most consoles do not have a built-in power amplifier or speakers, so a special external keyboard amplifier and speaker cabinet is required.
- Spinet organs have two 44-note manuals and one octave of pedals, plus an internal power amplifier and set of speakers.

==== Console organs ====
Medley
A medley played on a 1935 Model A Hammond organ through a Leslie speaker.

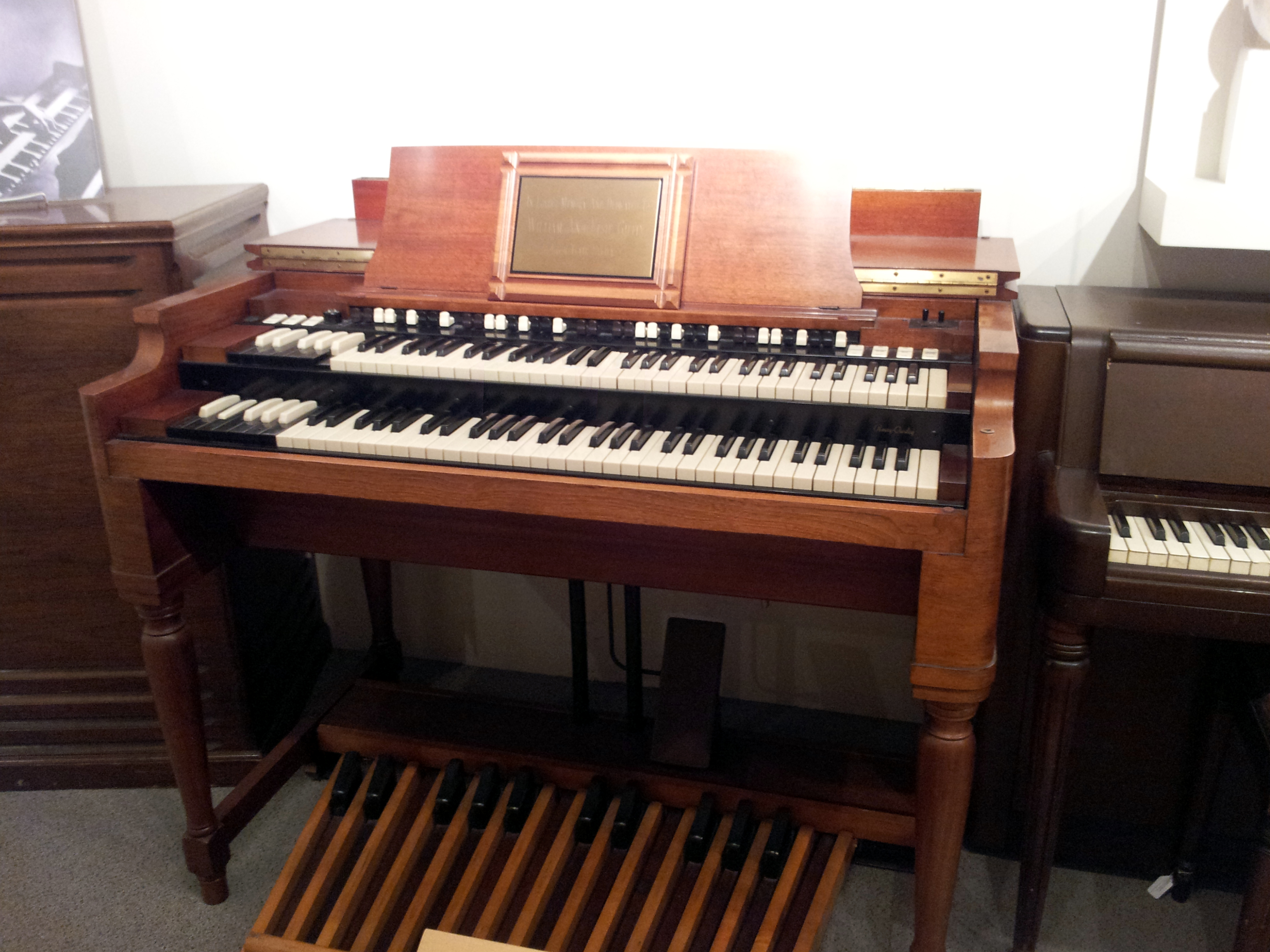
The B-3 was the most popular Hammond organ, produced from 1954 to 1974.

The first model in production, in June 1935, was the Model A. It contained most of the features that came to be standard on all console Hammonds, including two 61-key manuals, a 25-key pedalboard, an expression pedal, 12 reverse-color preset keys, and one for the pedals.

To address concerns that the sound of the Hammond was not rich enough to accurately mimic a pipe organ, the model BC was introduced in December 1936. It included a chorus generator, in which a second tonewheel system added slightly sharp or flat tones to the overall sound of each note. The cabinet was made deeper to accommodate this. Production of the old Model A cases stopped, but the older model continued to be available as the AB until October 1938. A model BA of 1938 may be seen and heard at the Musical Museum, Brentford England.

Criticism that the Hammond organ was more aesthetically suitable to the home instead of the church led to the introduction of the model C in September 1939. It contained the same internals as the AB or BC, but covered on the front and sides by "modesty panels" to cover female organists' legs while playing in a skirt, often a consideration when a church organ was placed in front of the congregation. The model C did not contain the chorus generator, but had space in the cabinet for it to be fitted. The concurrent model D was a model C with a prefitted chorus. Development of the vibrato system took place during the early 1940s, and was put into production shortly after the end of World War II. The various models available were the BV and CV (vibrato only) and BCV and DV (vibrato and chorus).

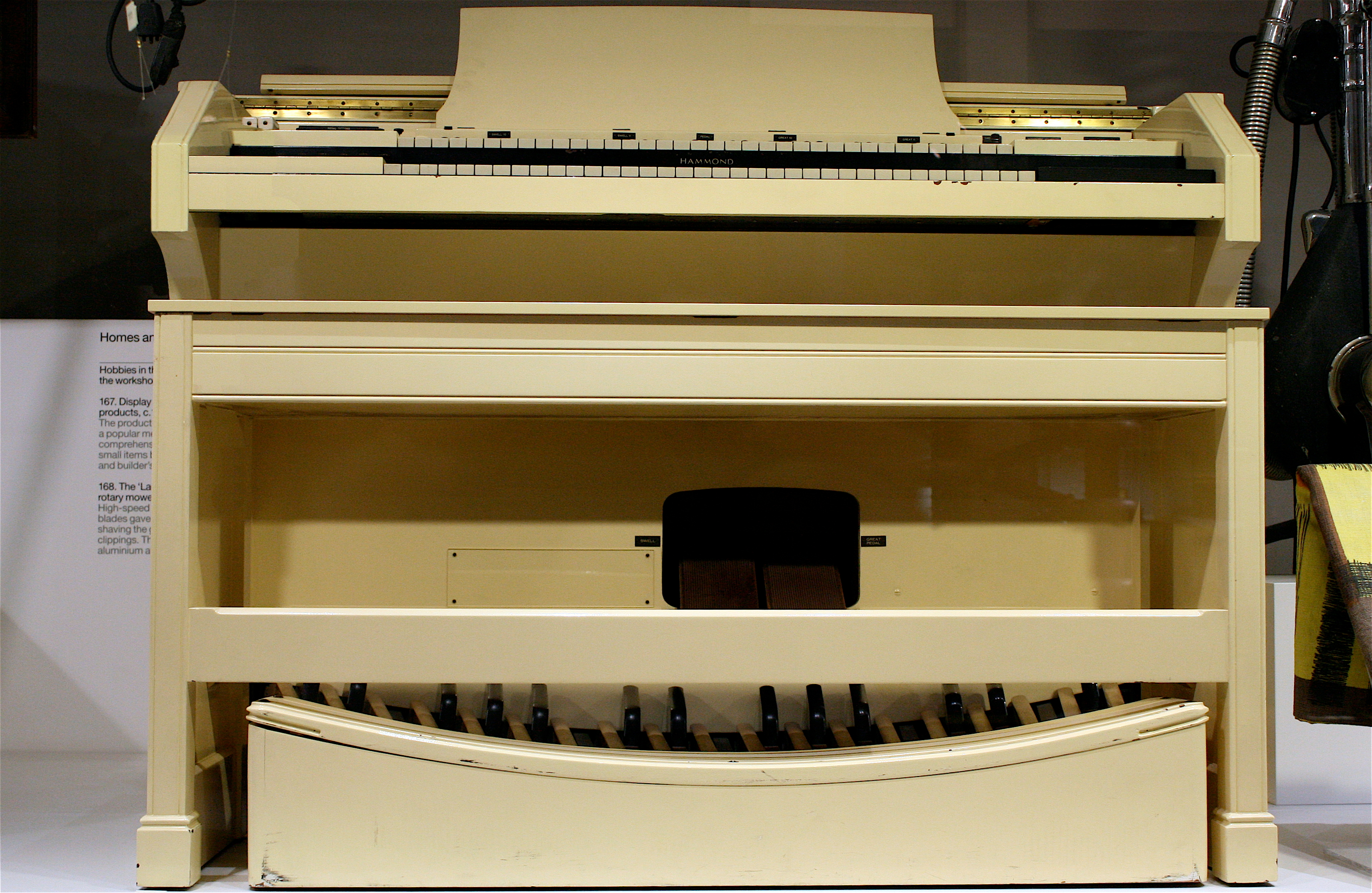
The Concert Model E was designed for church use and features a full 32-note pedalboard.

The B-2 and C-2, introduced in 1949, allowed vibrato to be enabled or disabled on each manual separately. In 1954, the B-3 and C-3 models were introduced with the additional harmonic percussion feature, advertised as "touch response percussion control". Despite several attempts by Hammond to replace them, these two models remained popular and stayed in continuous production through early 1975. The last B-3 and C-3 organs manufactured were built from leftover parts, and are not considered as good as earlier models.

To cater more specifically to the church market, Hammond introduced the Concert Model E in July 1937, which included a full 32-note pedalboard and four electric switches known as toe pistons, allowing various sounds to be selected by the feet. The model E was replaced by the model RT in 1949, which retained the full-sized pedalboard, but otherwise was internally identical to the B and C models. RT-2 and RT-3 models subsequently appeared in line with the B-2/C-2 and B-3/C-3, respectively.

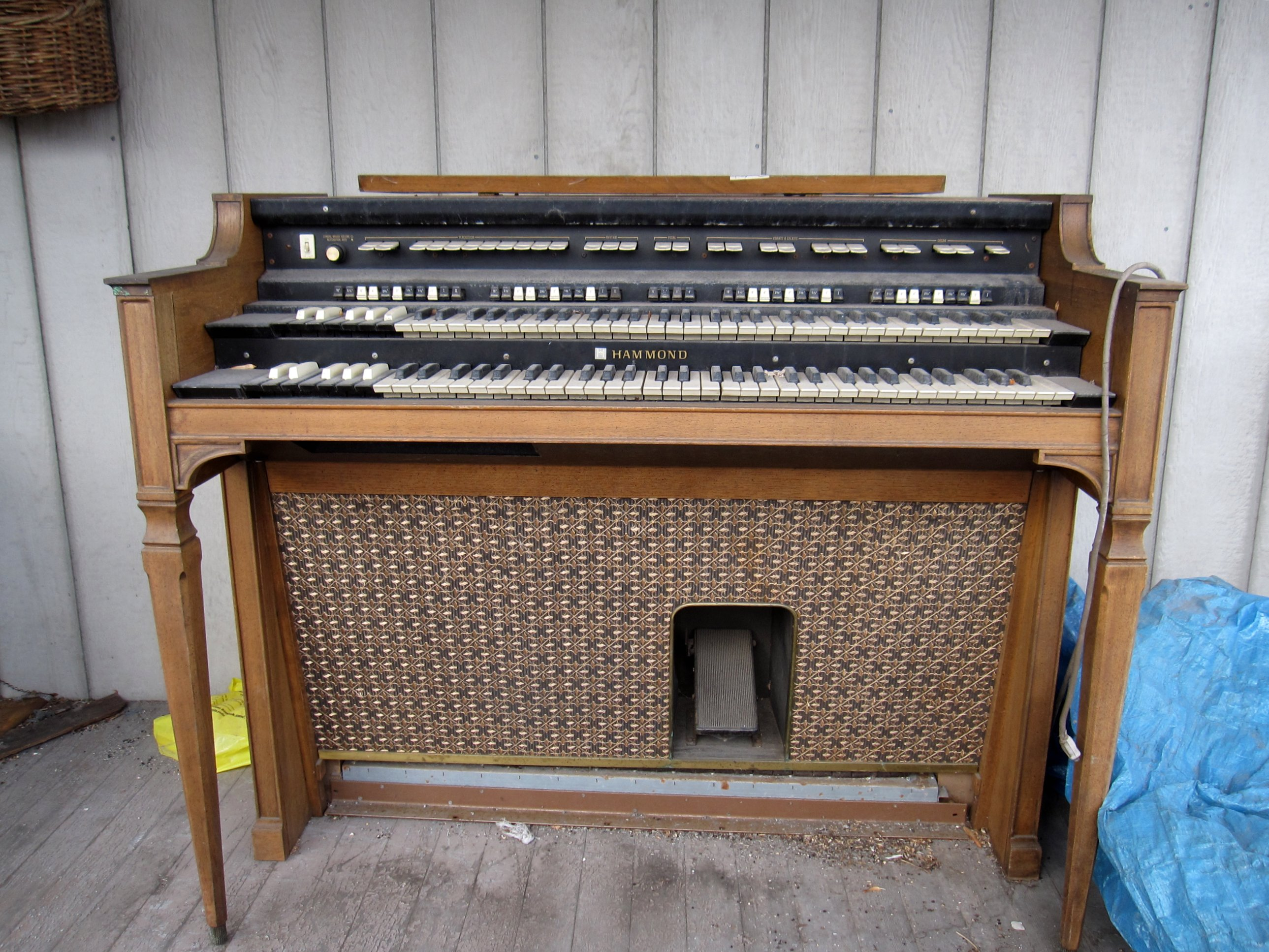
The H-100 was an unsuccessful attempt to replace the B-3

In 1959, Hammond introduced the A-100 series. It was effectively a self-contained version of the B-3/C-3, with an internal power amplifier and speakers. The organ was manufactured in a variety of different chassis, with the last two digits of the specific model number determining the style and finish of the instrument. For example, A-105 was "Tudor styling in light oak or walnut", while the A-143 was "warm cherry finish, Early American styling". This model numbering scheme was used for several other series of console and spinet organs that subsequently appeared. The D-100 series, which provided a self-contained version of the RT-3, followed in 1963.

The E-100 series was a cost-reduced version of the A-100 introduced in 1965, with only one set of drawbars per manual, a reduced number of presets, and a slightly different tone generator. This was followed by the H-100 series, with a redesigned tonewheel generator and various other additional features. An extended model, the H-300, also featured an integrated drum machine. The organ was not particularly well made, and suffered a reputation for being unreliable. Hammond service engineer Harvey Olsen said, "When they [H-100s] work, they sound pretty decent. But die-hard enthusiasts won't touch it."

==== Spinet organs ====
Though the instrument had been originally designed for use in a church, Hammond realized that the amateur home market was a far more lucrative business, and started manufacturing spinet organs in the late 1940s. Outside of the United States, they were manufactured in greater numbers than the consoles, and hence were more widely used. Several different types of M series instruments were produced between 1948 and 1964; they contained two 44-note manuals with one set of drawbars each, and a 12-note pedalboard. The M model was produced from 1948 to 1951, the M-2 from 1951 to 1955, and the M-3 from 1955 to 1964. The M series was replaced by the M-100 series in 1961, which used a numbering system to identify the body style and finish as used on earlier console series. It included the same manuals as the M, but increased the pedalboard size to 13 notes, stretching a full octave, and included a number of presets.

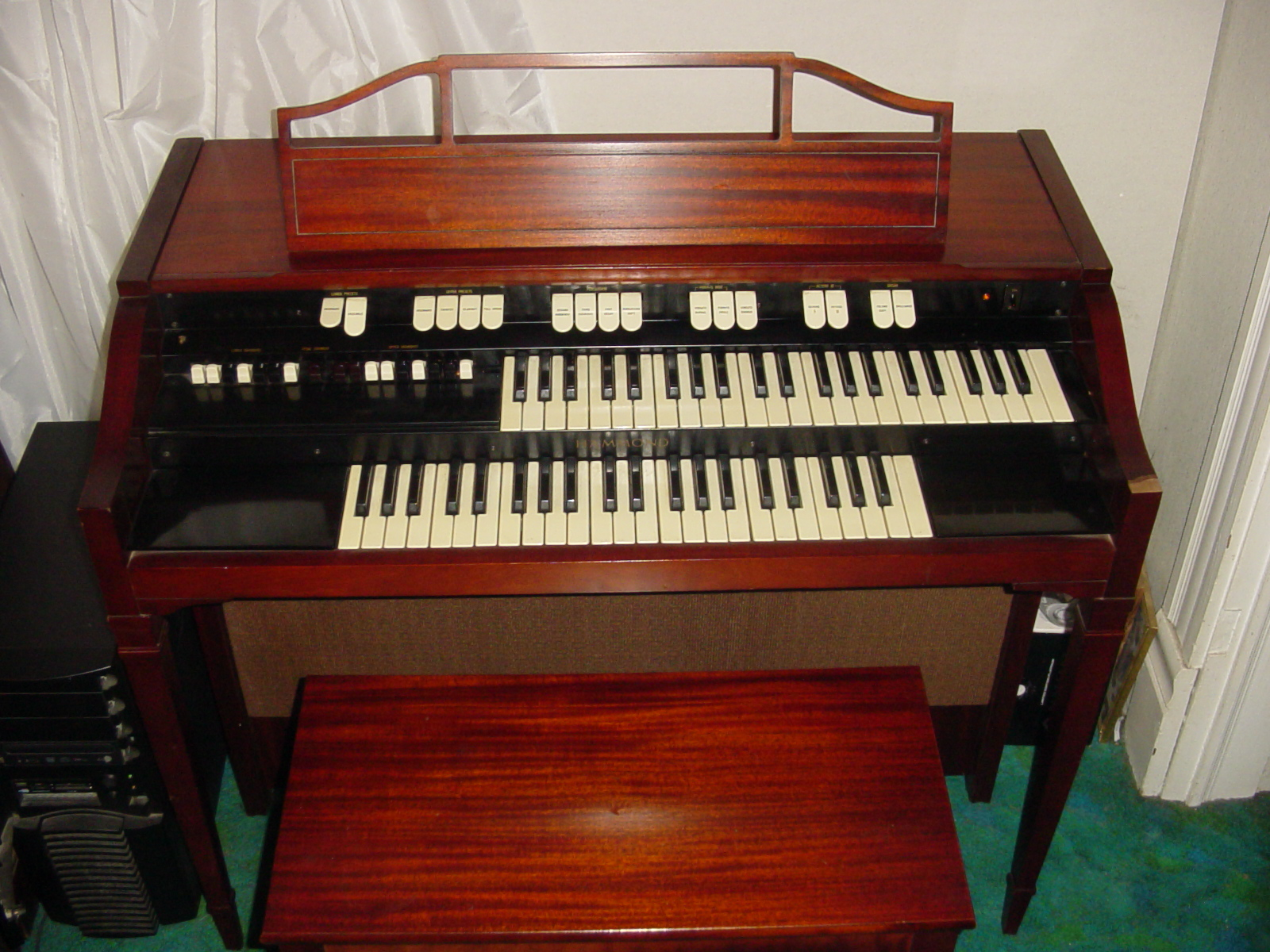
The L-100 spinet was particularly popular in the UK.

The L-100 series entered production at the same time as the M-100. It was an economy version, with various cost-cutting changes so the organ could retail for under $1,000. The vibrato was a simpler circuit than on other consoles and spinets. Two variations of the vibrato were provided, plus a chorus that mixed various vibrato signals together. The expression pedal, based on a cheaper design, was not as sophisticated as on the other organs. The L-100 sold particularly well in the UK, with several notable British musicians using it instead of a B-3 or C-3.

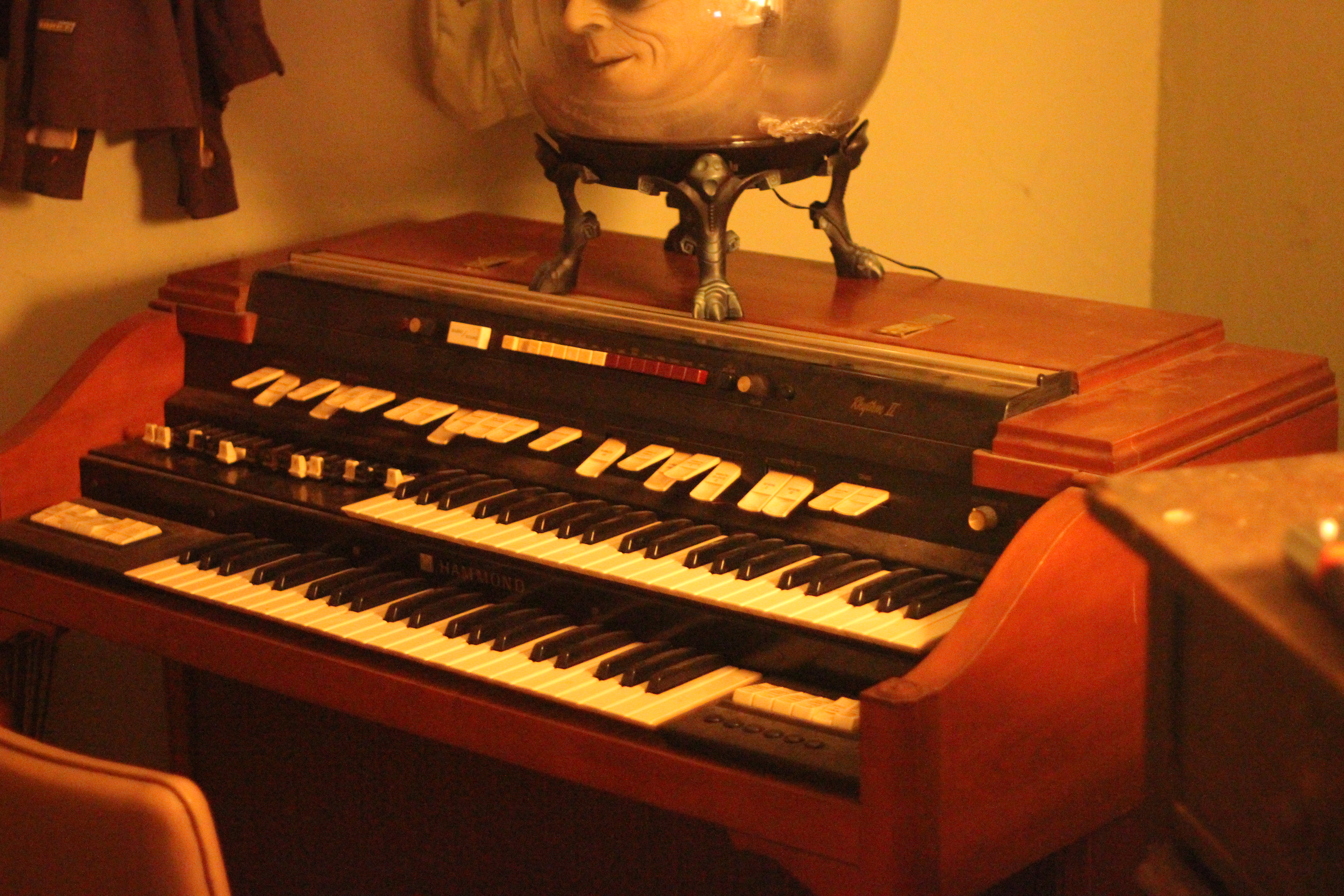
The T-402 was one of the last tonewheel organs manufactured and included a built in drum machine

The T series, produced from 1968 to 1975, was the last of the tonewheel spinet organs. Unlike all the earlier Hammond organs, which used vacuum tubes for preamplification, amplification, percussion and chorus-vibrato control, the T series used all-solid-state, transistor circuitry, though, unlike the L-100, it did include the scanner-vibrato as seen on the B-3. Other than the T-100 series models, all other T-Series models included a built-in rotating Leslie speaker and some included an analog drum machine, while the T-500 also included a built-in cassette recorder. It was one of the last tonewheel Hammonds produced.

=== Transistor organs ===
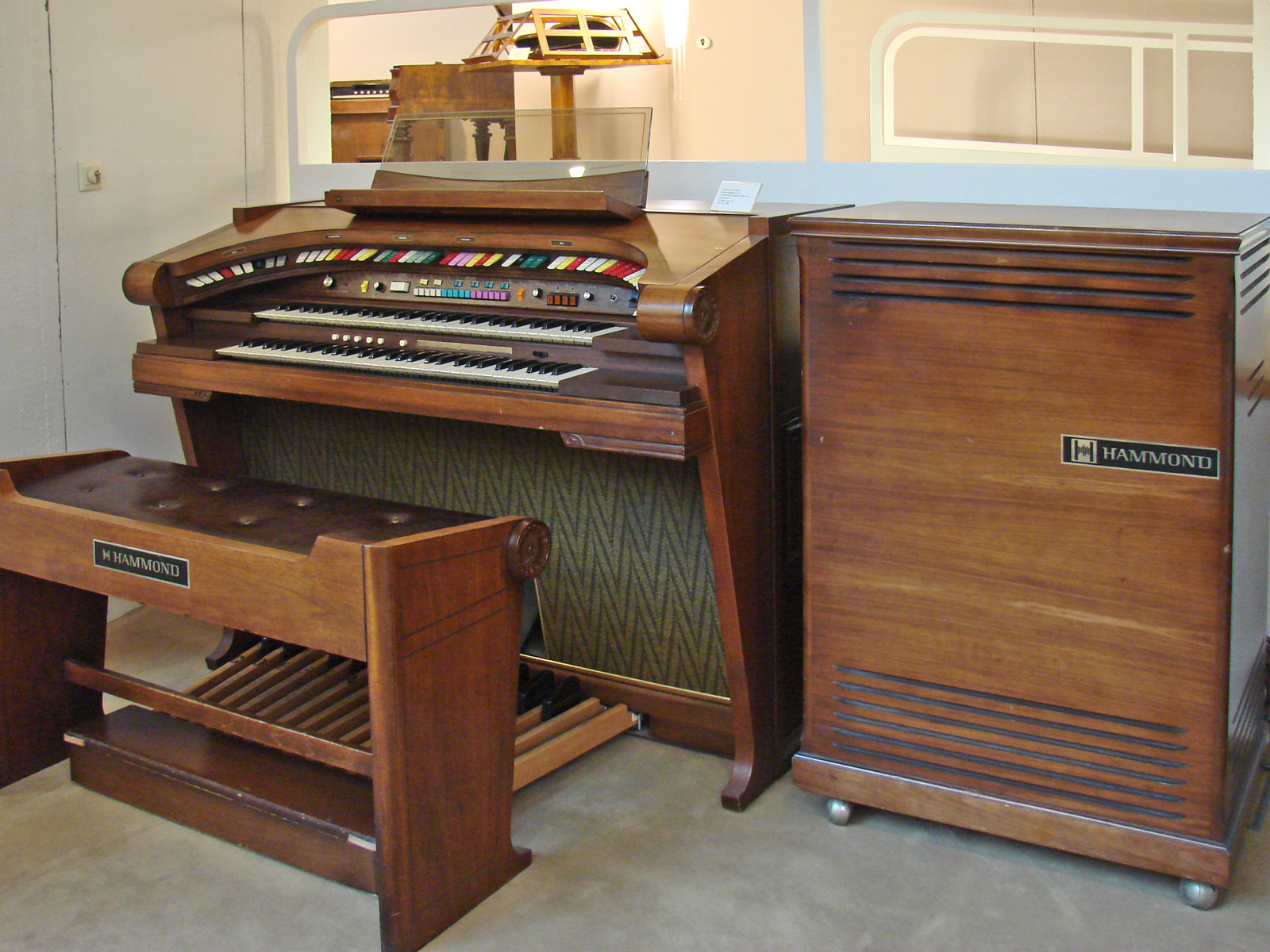
Hammond started making transistor organs by the mid-1970s. c. 1973–1976 Regent model pictured.

In the 1960s, Hammond began to manufacture transistor organs in response to competitors such as Lowrey and Wurlitzer who were offering them, with a greater feature set compared to tonewheel Hammonds. The first organ that bridged the gap between tonewheel and transistor was the X-66, introduced in May 1967. The X-66 contained just 12 tonewheels, and used electronics for frequency division. It contained separate "vibrato bass" and "vibrato treble" in an attempt to simulate a Leslie speaker. Hammond designed it as the company's flagship product, in response to market competition and to replace the B-3. However, it was considered expensive at $9,795 and it sold poorly because it did not sound like a B-3.

Hammond introduced their first integrated circuit (IC) model, the Concorde, in 1971. The company had stopped manufacturing tonewheel organs entirely by 1975, due to increased financial inefficiency, and switched to making IC models full-time. Console models included the 8000 Aurora (1976) and 8000M Aurora (1977), which contained drawbars and a built-in rotating speaker. Spinet organs included the K-100 and J-400 series, and the "Cadette" V series. Some models included a headphone jack. The B-3 and C-3 were replaced by the B-3000, designed to be a model for professional use that had the same look and feel of the earlier organs. It contained the same controls, but was 200 pounds (91 kg) lighter than a B-3. Although promoted by Hammond as a suitable replacement, musicians did not think it had a comparable sound. In 1979, a Japanese offshoot, Nihon Hammond (literally meaning 'Japan Hammond'), introduced the X-5, a portable solid-state clone of the B-3.

Though transistor Hammonds were criticised for their sound, the company remained commercially successful. Many such models were sold to churches, funeral homes and private residences.

=== Hammond-Suzuki ===
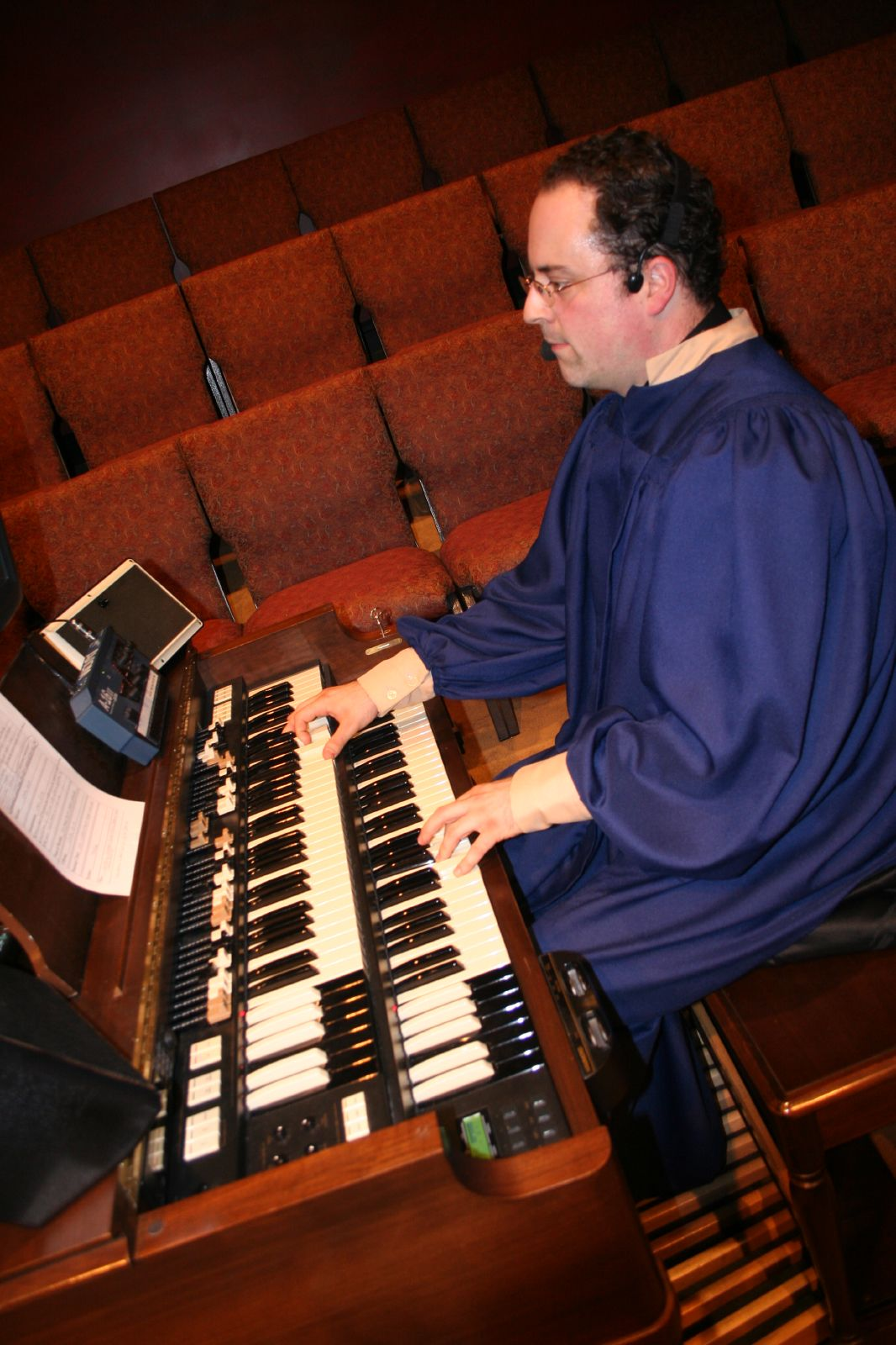
Hammond-Suzuki produced the XB-3, a digital emulation of a tonewheel organ, during the 1990s

In 1972, Hammond proposed the purchase of a majority stake in the Japanese company Roland in 1972, which Roland turned down. Roland's founder, Ikutaro Kakehashi, did not believe it was practical to move Hammond's manufacturing operation from the US to Japan, and viewed Hammond's declining sales figures as a problem. Laurens Hammond died in 1973.

In 1985, Hammond went out of business, though servicing and spares continued to be available under the name of the Organ Service Company. In early 1986, the Hammond brand and rights were acquired by Hammond Organ Australia, run by Noel Crabbe. Then in 1989, the name was purchased by the Suzuki Musical Instrument Corporation, which rebranded the company as Hammond-Suzuki. Although nominally a Japanese company, founder Manji Suzuki was a fan of the instrument and retained several former Hammond Organ Company staff for research and development, and ensured that production would partially remain in the United States. The new company produced their own brand of portable organs, including the XB-2, XB-3 and XB-5. Sound on Sound's Rod Spark, a longtime Hammond enthusiast, said these models were "a matter of taste, of course, but I don't think they're a patch on the old ones".

In 2002, Hammond-Suzuki launched the New B-3, a recreation of the original electromechanical instrument using contemporary electronics and a digital tonewheel simulator. The New B-3 is constructed to appear like the original B-3, and the designers attempted to retain the subtle nuances of the familiar B-3 sound. Hammond-Suzuki promotional material states that it would be difficult for even an experienced B-3 player to distinguish between the old and new B-3 organs. A review of the New B-3 by Hugh Robjohns called it "a true replica of an original B-3 ... in terms of the look and layout, and the actual sound". The instrument project nearly stalled after a breakdown in negotiations between Japanese and United States staff, the latter of whom insisted on manufacturing the case in the United States and designing the organ to identical specifications to the original.

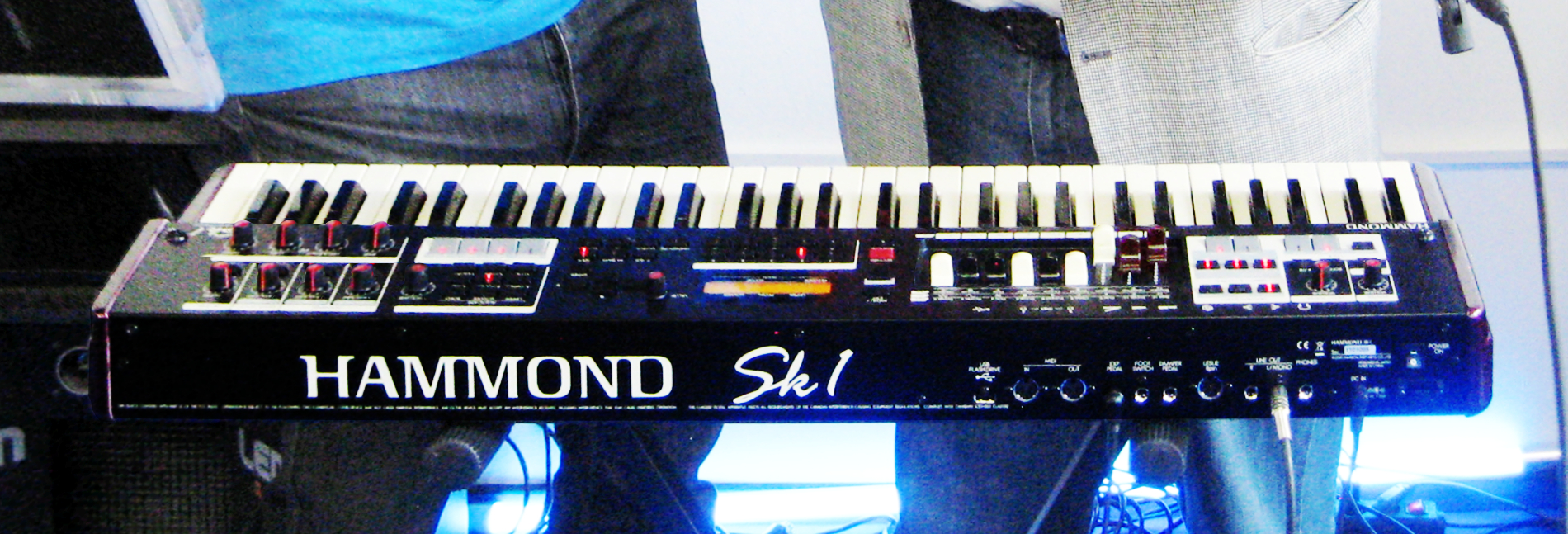
The Hammond SK1 included emulations of electric pianos and other keyboard sounds in addition to organ.

The company has since released the XK-3, a single-manual organ using the same digital tonewheel technology as the New B-3. The XK-3 is part of a modular system that allows an integrated lower manual and pedals to be added. In response to some clones, including a variety of vintage keyboards in a single package, Hammond released the SK series of organs, which include grand piano, Rhodes piano, Wurlitzer electronic piano, Hohner clavinet, and samples of wind and brass instruments alongside the standard drawbar and tonewheel emulation. Keyboard magazine's Stephen Fortner praised the single manual SK1, indicated that it gave an accurate sound throughout the range of drawbar settings, and said the organ sound was "fat, warm, utterly authentic". The XK-1c model was introduced in early 2014, which is simply an organ-only version of the SK1. An updated flagship organ, the XK-5, was launched in 2016, and a stage keyboard, the SK-X followed in 2019, which allows a player to select an individual instrument (organ, piano or synthesizer) for each manual.

In the US, Hammond manufactures a number of dedicated console organs, including the B-3mk2 and the C-3mk2, and the A-405, a Chapel Console Organ. The company has a dedicated Church Advisory Team that provides a consultancy, so churches can choose the most appropriate instrument.

== Speakers ==
=== Tone cabinet ===
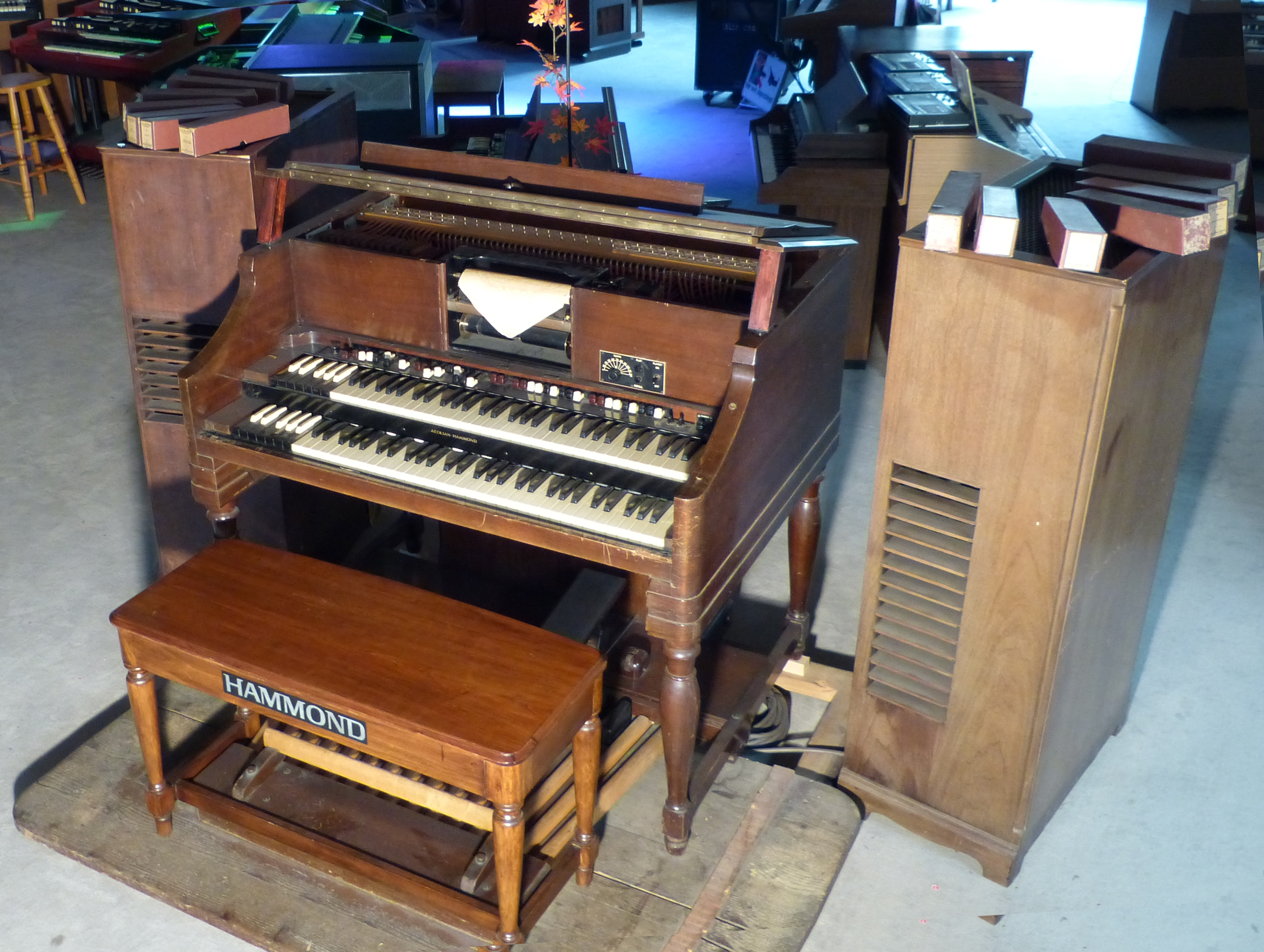
Aeolian Hammond BA player organ with Hammond tone cabinet (1938)

The authorized loudspeaker enclosure to use with a console organ was the Hammond Tone Cabinet, which contained an external amplifier and speaker. The cabinet carried a balanced mono signal and AC power directly from the organ via a six-pin cable. Spinet organs contained their own built-in amplifier and speakers.

The tone cabinet was originally the only method of adding reverberation to a Hammond organ. The first models to be produced were the 20-watt A-20 and 40-watt A-40. The A-20 was designed for churches and small-capacity halls, and featured a set of doors in front of the speaker, that could be closed when the organ was not in use. The D-20 was introduced in 1937 and only allowed sound from the speakers to escape by a louvered opening on one side and a gap in the top. The PR series introduced in 1959, and was a commercial success. The 40-watt PR40 weighed 126 pounds (57 kg) and was 37.5 inches (950 mm) high. It has a good response from bass pedals.

=== Leslie speaker ===
Chord sequence
A simple chord sequence played on a Hammond organ through a Leslie speaker.

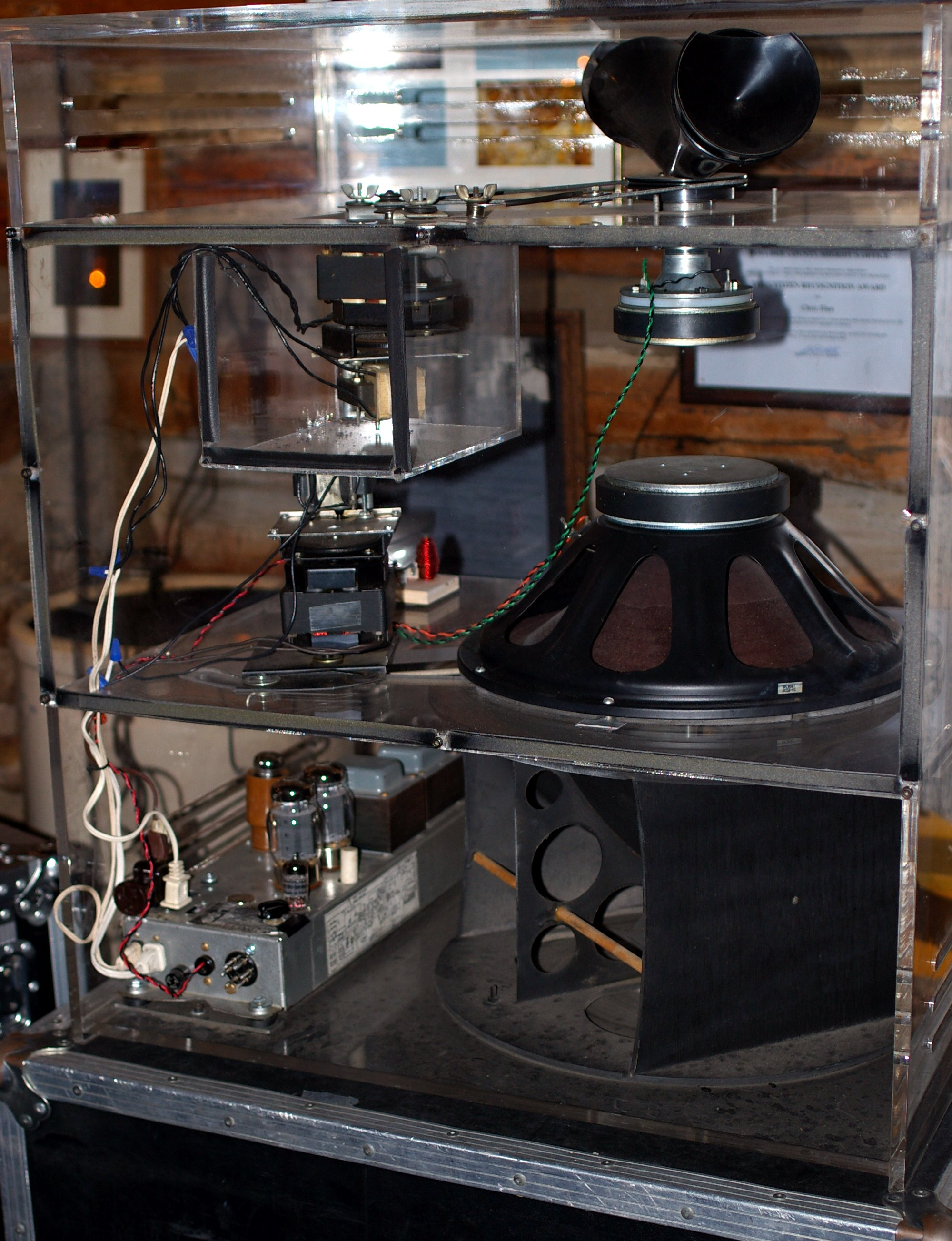
A Leslie speaker with a transparent case

Many players prefer to play the Hammond through a cabinet with a rotating speaker known, after several name changes, as a Leslie speaker, after its inventor Donald J. Leslie. The typical Leslie system is an integrated speaker/amplifier combination in which sound is emitted by a rotating horn over a stationary treble compression driver, and a rotating baffle beneath a stationary bass woofer. This creates a characteristic sound because of the constantly changing pitch shifts that result from the Doppler effect created by the moving sound sources.

The Leslie was originally designed to mimic the complex tones and constantly shifting sources of sound emanating from a large group of ranks in a pipe organ. The effect varies depending on the speed of the rotors, which can be toggled between fast (tremolo) and slow (chorale) using a console half-moon or pedal switch, with the most distinctive effect occurring as the speaker rotation speed changes. The most popular Leslies were the 122, which accepted a balanced signal suitable for console organs, and the 147, which accepted an unbalanced signal and could be used for spinet organs with a suitable adapter. The Pro-Line series of Leslies which were made to be portable for gigging bands using solid-state amps were popular during the 1970s.

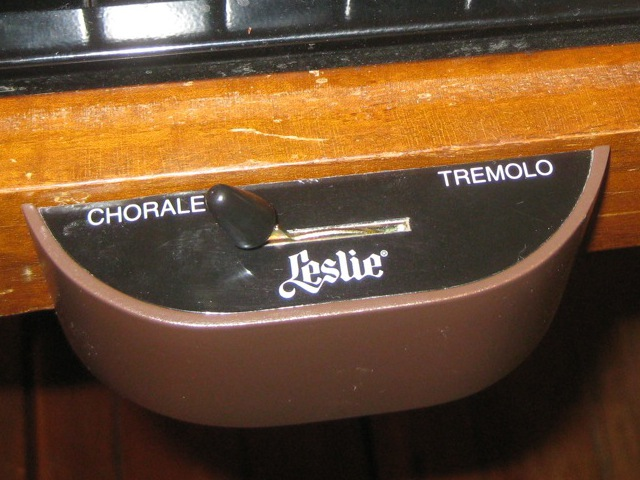
A "half-moon"-shaped switch for changing the speed of a Leslie speaker

Leslie initially tried to sell his invention to Hammond, but Laurens Hammond was unimpressed and declined to purchase it. Hammond modified their interface connectors to be "Leslie-proof", but Leslie quickly engineered a workaround. Some Hammond staff thought Laurens Hammond was being irrational and autocratic towards Leslie, but Don Leslie later said it helped give his speakers publicity.

The Leslie company was sold to CBS in 1965, and the following year, Hammond finally decided to officially support the Leslie speaker. The T-200 spinet, introduced in 1968, was the first Hammond to have an integrated Leslie speaker. Hammond finally purchased Leslie in 1980. Hammond-Suzuki acquired the rights to Leslie in 1992; the company currently markets a variety of speakers under this name. As well as faithful reissues of the original 122 speaker, the company announced in 2013 that they would start manufacturing a standalone Leslie simulator in a stomp box.

== Tone generation ==
The tonewheel rotates beside an electromagnetic pickup.

Although they are sometimes included in the category of electronic organs, the majority of Hammond organs are, strictly speaking, electric or electromechanical rather than electronic organs, because the sound is produced by moving parts rather than electronic oscillators.

The basic component sound of a Hammond organ comes from a tonewheel. Each one rotates in front of an electromagnetic pickup. The variation in the magnetic field induces a small alternating current at a particular frequency, which represents a signal similar to a sine wave. When a key is pressed on the organ, it completes a circuit of nine electrical switches, which are linked to the drawbars. The position of the drawbars, combined with the switches selected by the key pressed, determines which tonewheels are allowed to sound. Every tonewheel is connected to a synchronous motor via a system of gears, which ensures that each note remains at a constant relative pitch to every other.

The combined signal from all depressed keys and pedals is fed through to the vibrato system, which is driven by a metal scanner. As the scanner rotates around a set of pickups, it changes the pitch of the overall sound slightly.

From here, the sound is sent to the main amplifier, and on to the audio speakers.

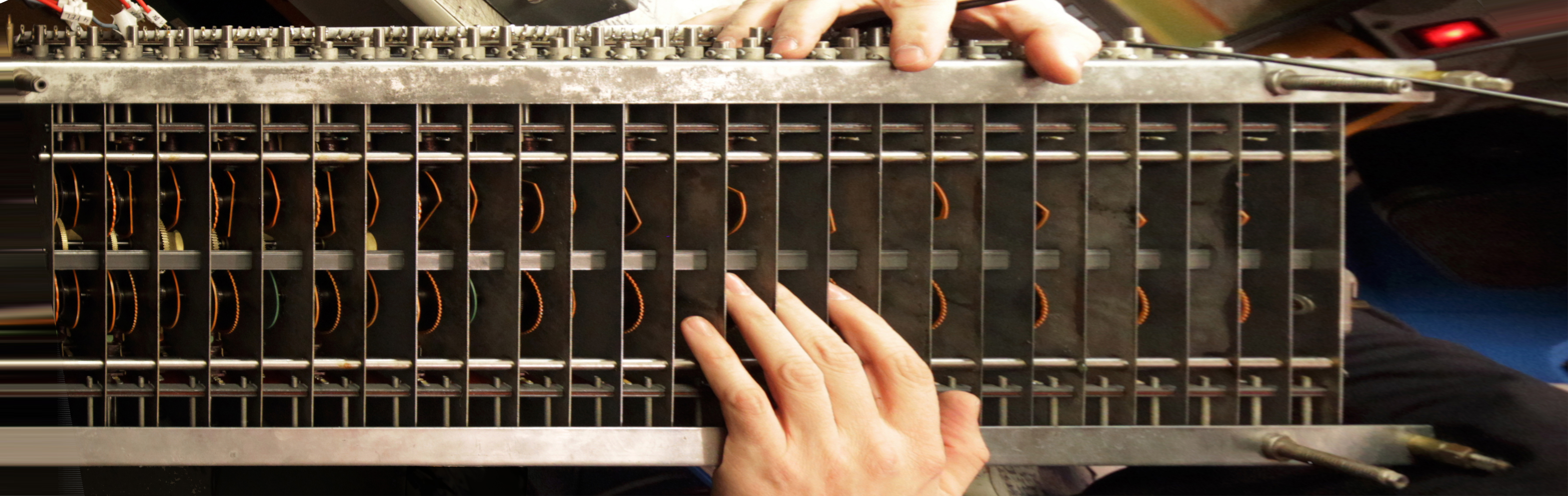
Hammond CV tonegenerator (1946) (whole)

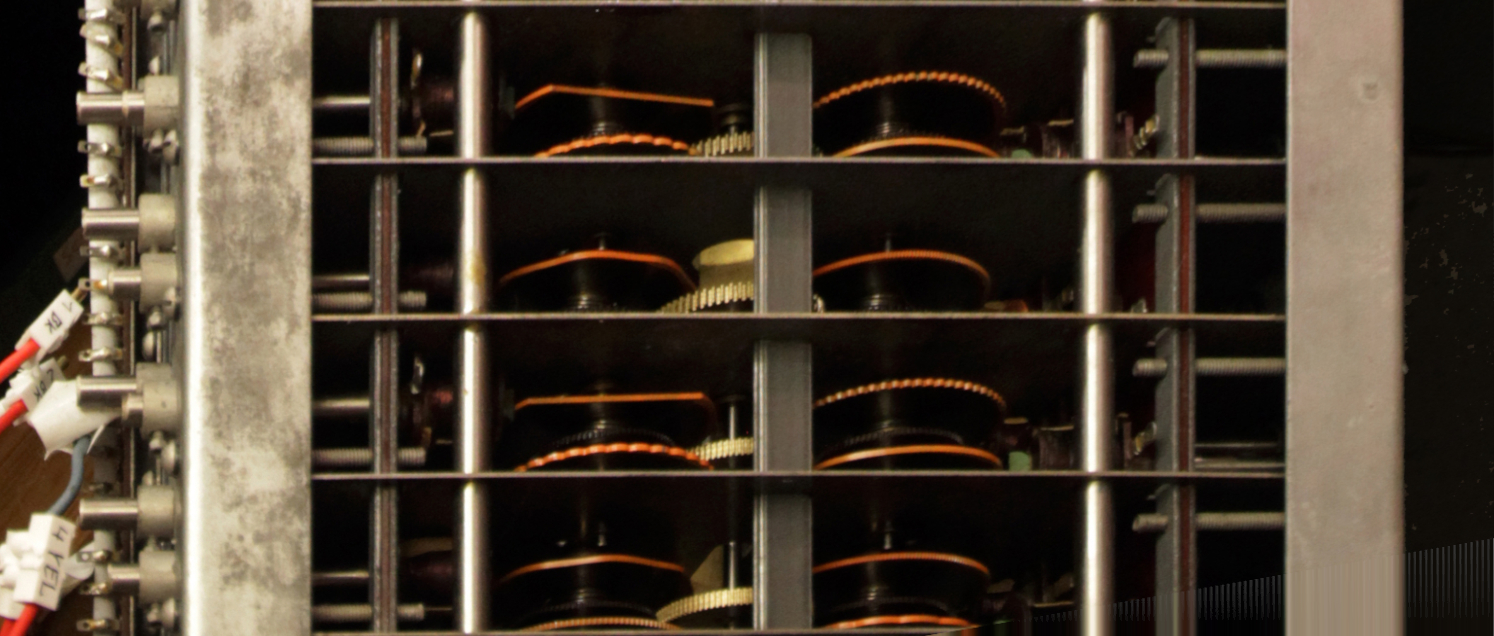
Hammond CV tonegenerator (1946) (details)

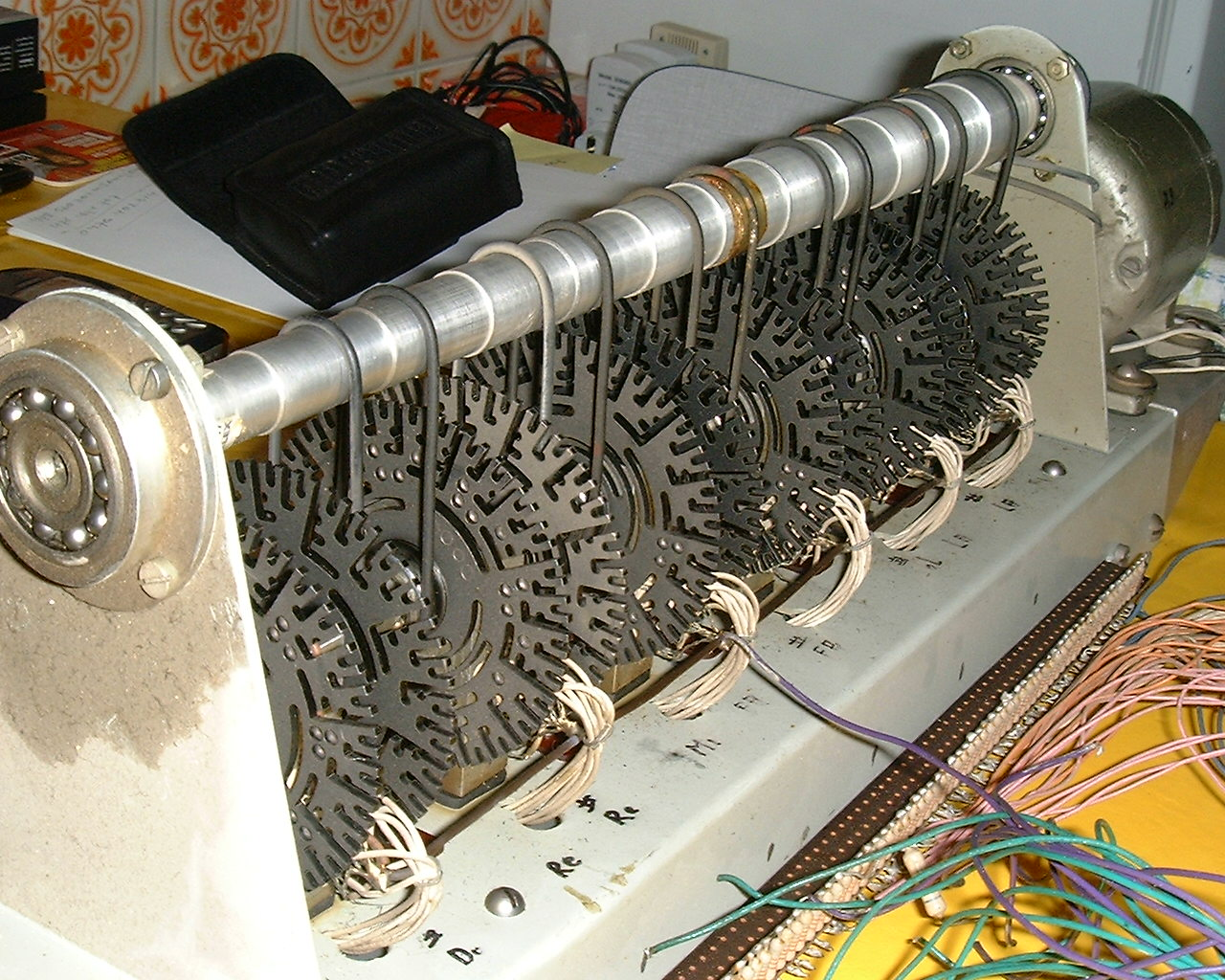
A prototype light-weight tonewheel generator, produced at the Hammond Organ Company's factory in Antwerp (1954/56)

The Hammond organ makes technical compromises in the notes it generates. Rather than produce harmonics that are exact multiples of the fundamental as in equal temperament, it uses the nearest-available frequencies generated by the tonewheels. The only guaranteed frequency for a Hammond's tuning is concert A at 440 Hz.

Crosstalk or "leakage" occurs when the instrument's magnetic pickups receive the signal from rotating metal tonewheels other than those selected by the organist. Hammond considered crosstalk a defect that required correcting, and in 1963 introduced a new level of resistor–capacitor filtering to greatly reduce this crosstalk, along with 50–60 Hz mains hum. However, the sound of tonewheel crosstalk is now considered part of the signature of the Hammond organ, to the extent that modern digital clones explicitly emulate it.

Some Hammond organs have an audible pop or click when a key is pressed. Originally, key click was considered a design defect and Hammond worked to eliminate or at least reduce it with equalization filters. However, many performers liked the percussive effect, and it has been accepted as part of the classic sound. Hammond research and development engineer Alan Young said, "the professionals who were playing popular music [liked] that the attack was so prominent. And they objected when it was eliminated."

Because the tones on a Hammond organ are mechanically generated, different models were manufactured for the US and European markets, which run on 110 V/60 Hz and 240 V/50 Hz AC mains respectively. The gearing and starter motors are different, and run at 1,200 RPM and 1,500 RPM respectively. Third-party companies manufacture adapters that can allow a Hammond organ designed for one region to run in the other, which are used by internationally touring bands.

== Clones and emulation devices ==
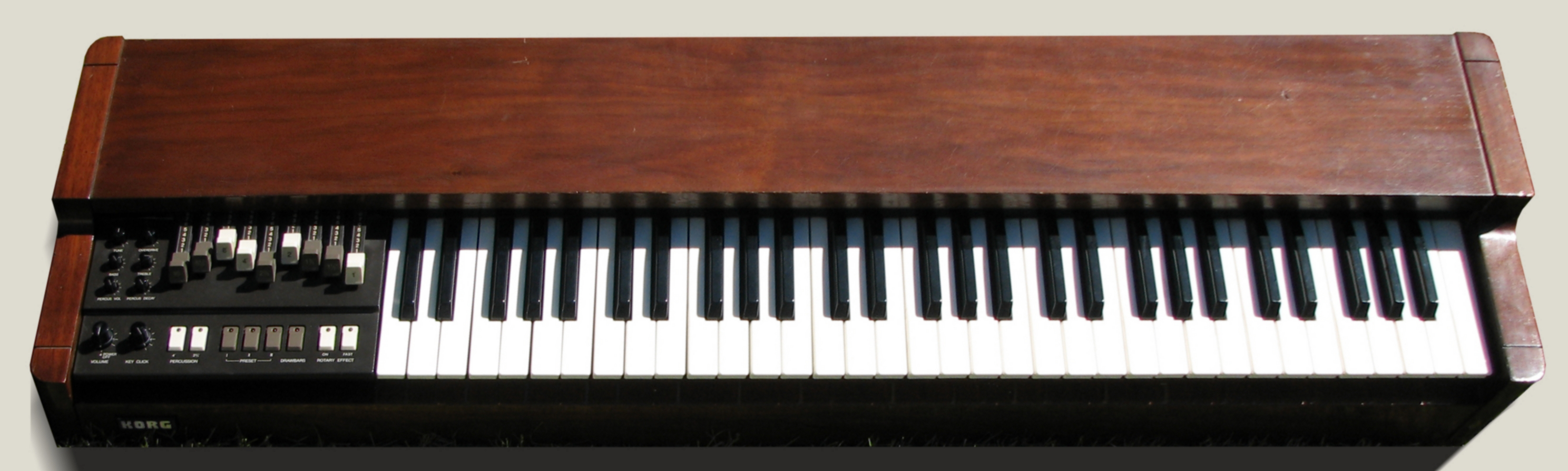
According to journalist Gordon Reid, the Korg CX-3 "came close to emulating the true depth and passion of a vintage Hammond".

The original Hammond organ was never designed to be transported regularly. A Hammond B-3 organ, bench, and pedalboard weighs 425 pounds (193 kg). This weight, combined with that of a Leslie speaker, makes the instrument cumbersome and difficult to move between venues. This created a demand for a more portable and reliable way of generating the same sound. Electronic and digital keyboards that imitate the sound of the Hammond are referred to as "clonewheel organs".

The first attempts to electronically copy a Hammond appeared in the 1970s, including the Roland VK-1 and VK-9, the Yamaha YC45D, and the Crumar Organizer. The Korg CX-3 (single manual) and BX-3 (dual manual) were the first lightweight organs to produce a sound comparable to the original. Sound on Sound's Gordon Reid said that the CX-3 "came close to emulating the true depth and passion of a vintage Hammond", particularly when played through a Leslie speaker.

The Roland VK-7, introduced in 1997, attempted to emulate the sound of a Hammond using digital signal processing technology. An updated version, the VK-8, which appeared in 2002, also provided emulations of other vintage keyboards and provided a connector for a Leslie.

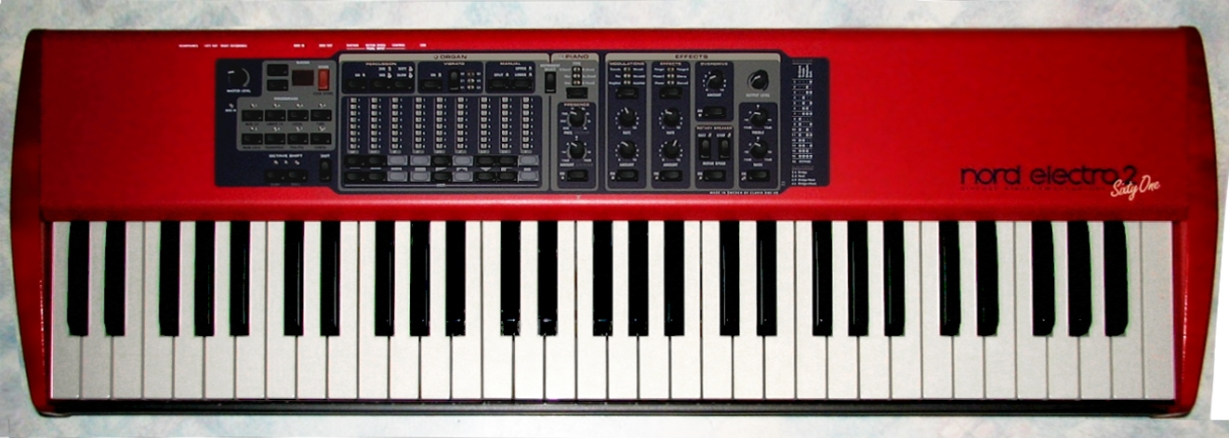
The Nord Electro emulated drawbars using buttons and a light-emitting diode display

Clavia introduced the Nord Electro in 2001; this used buttons to emulate the physical action of pulling or pushing a drawbar, with an LED graph indicating its current state. Clavia has released several updated versions of the Electro since then, and introduced the Nord Stage with the same technology. The Nord C2D was Clavia's first organ with real drawbars.

Diversi, founded by former Hammond-Suzuki sales representative Tom Tuson in 2003, specialized in Hammond clones, and had an endorsement from Joey DeFrancesco.

The Hammond organ has also been emulated in software. One prominent emulator is the Native Instruments B4 series, which has been praised for its attention to detail and choice of features. Emagic (now part of Apple) has also produced a software emulation, the EVB3. This has led to a Hammond organ module with all controls and features of the original instrument in the Logic Pro audio production suite.

== Notable players ==
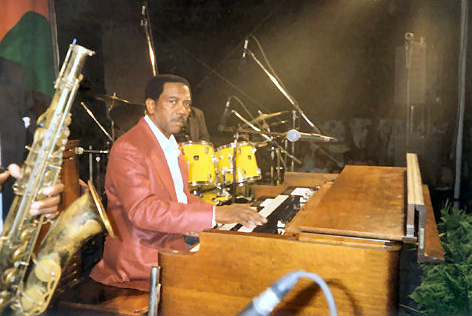
Jimmy Smith's use of the Hammond organ from the 1950s on gained commercial success and influenced other organists.

Early customers of the Hammond included Albert Schweitzer, Henry Ford, Eleanor Roosevelt, and George Gershwin. The instrument was not initially favored by classical organ purists, because the tones of two notes an octave apart were in exact synchronization, as opposed to the slight variation present on a pipe organ. However, the instrument did gradually become popular with jazz players. One of the first performers to use the Hammond organ was Ethel Smith, who was known as the "first lady of the Hammond organ". Fats Waller and Count Basie also started using the Hammond. Organist John Medeski thinks the Hammond became "the poor man's big band", but because of that, it became more economical to book organ trios.

Jimmy Smith began to play Hammond regularly in the 1950s, particularly in his sessions for the BlueNote label between 1956 and 1963. He eschewed a bass player, and played all the bass parts himself using the pedals, generally using a walking bassline on the pedals in combination with percussive left-hand chords. His trio format, composed of organ, guitar, and drums, became internationally known following an appearance at the Newport Jazz Festival in 1957. Medeski says musicians "were inspired when they heard Jimmy Smith's records". "Brother" Jack McDuff switched from piano to Hammond in the 1950s, and toured regularly throughout the 1960s and 1970s. In his Hammond playing, Keith Emerson sought partly to replicate the sound achieved by McDuff in his arrangement of "Rock Candy". An admirer of Billy Preston's work also, particularly the 1965 instrumental "Billy's Bag", Emerson limited the use of Leslie because he felt that was Preston's domain at the time, whereas he himself was approaching the instrument with an aesthetic combining "a white European attitude", classical music, and rock.

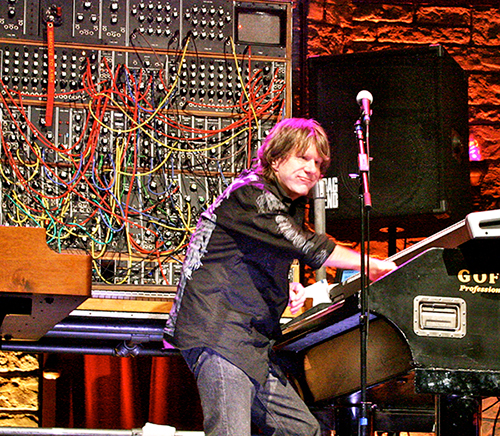
"I took to riding the L100 like a bucking bronco. It weighs 350 lb; when it's on top of you, you need the adrenalin rush you get onstage to chuck it around." Keith Emerson

Booker T. Jones is cited as being the bridge from rhythm and blues to rock. British organist James Taylor said the Hammond "became popular [in the UK] when people such as Booker T. & the M.G.'s and artists on the Stax Records label came over to London and played gigs". Matthew Fisher first encountered the Hammond in 1966, having heard the Small Faces' Ian McLagan playing one. When Fisher asked if he could play it, McLagan told him, "They're yelling out for Hammond players; why don't you go out and buy one for yourself?" Fisher played the organ lines on Procol Harum's "A Whiter Shade of Pale", which topped the UK charts in the summer of 1967. Steve Winwood started his musical career with the Spencer Davis Group playing guitar and piano, but he switched to Hammond when he hired one to record "Gimme Some Lovin'".

Gregg Allman became interested in the Hammond after Mike Finnigan had introduced him to Jimmy Smith's music, and started to write material with it. His brother Duane specifically requested he play the instrument when forming the Allman Brothers Band, and he was presented with a brand new B-3 and Leslie 122RV upon joining. Allman recalls the instrument was cumbersome to transport, particularly on flights of stairs, which often required the whole band's assistance. Author Frank Moriarty considers Allman's Hammond playing a vital ingredient of the band's sound.

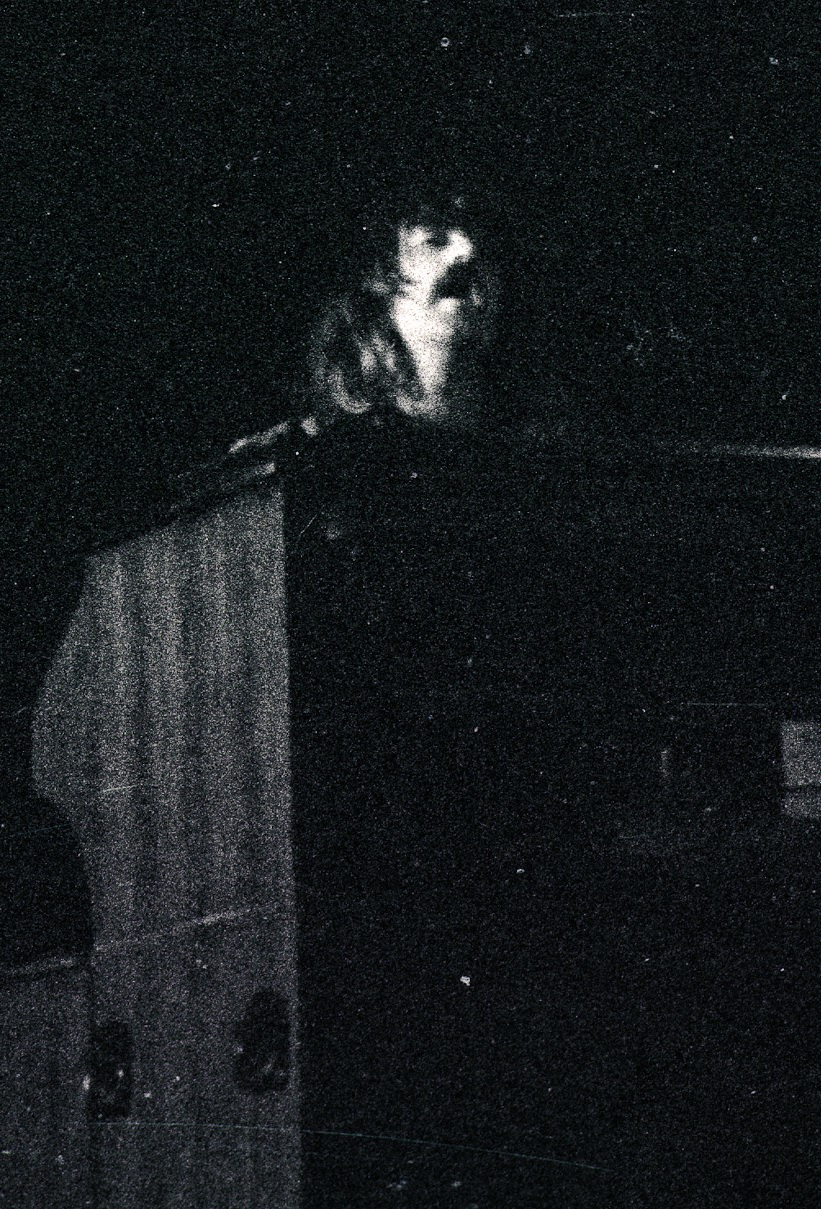
Jon Lord put his Hammond C-3 through an overdriven Marshall stack to fit in with Deep Purple's hard rock sound.

Deep Purple's Jon Lord became inspired to play the Hammond after hearing Jimmy Smith's "Walk on the Wild Side". He modified his Hammond so it could be played through a Marshall stack to get a growling, overdriven sound, which became known as his trademark and he is strongly identified with it. This organ was later acquired by Joey DeFrancesco. Van der Graaf Generator's Hugh Banton modified his Hammond E-100 extensively with customized electronics, including the ability to put effects such as distortion on one manual but not the other, and rewiring the motor. The modifications created, in Banton's own words, "unimaginable sonic chaos".

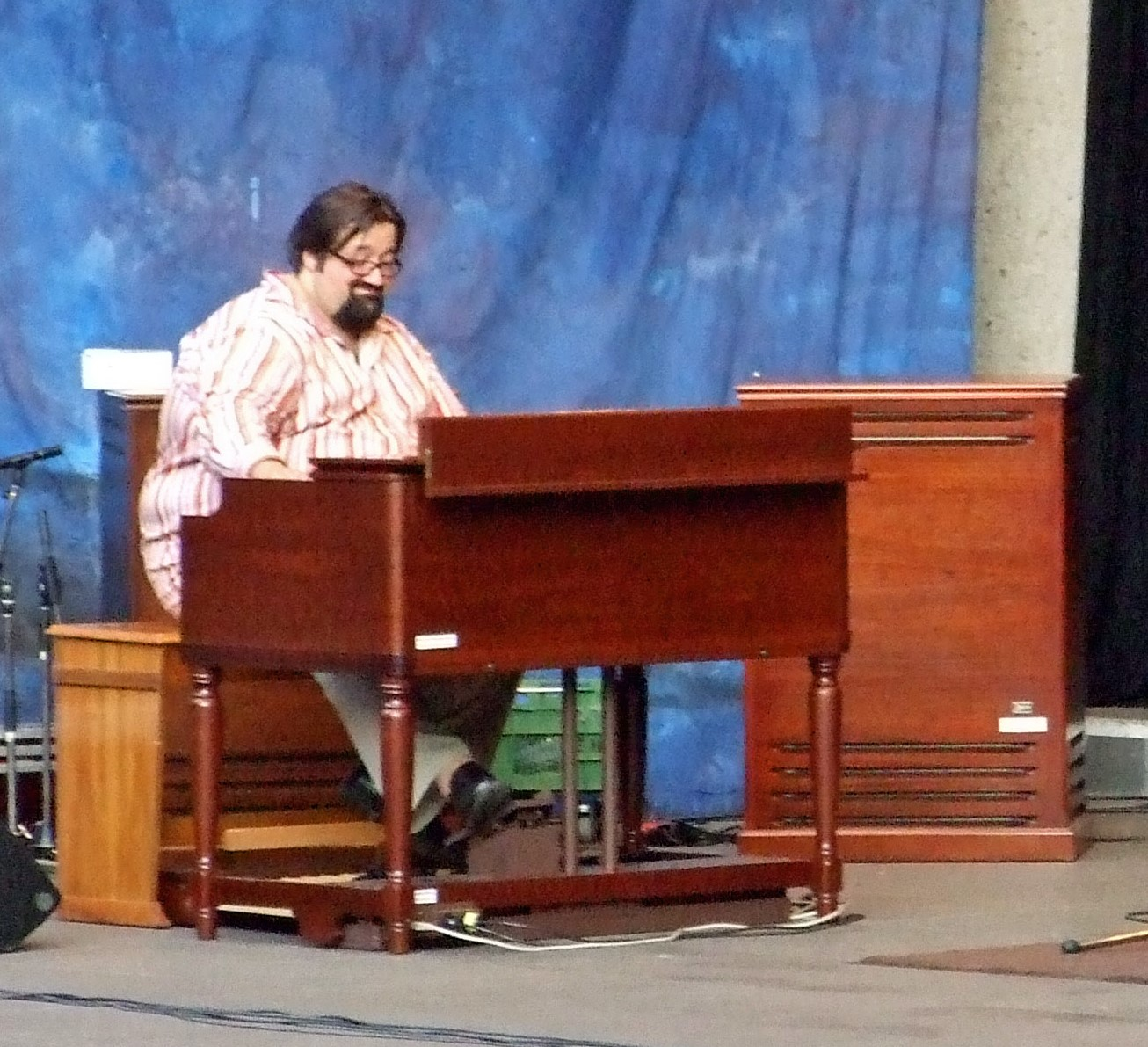
Joey DeFrancesco achieved critical success in the jazz genre using both original tonewheel Hammonds and the "New B-3".

The Hammond was a key instrument in progressive rock music. Author Edward Macan thinks this is because of its versatility, allowing both chords and lead lines to be played, and a choice between quiet and clean, and what Emerson described as a "tacky, aggressive, almost distorted, angry sound". However, progressive rock historian Paul Stump argued that initially, the popularity of the Hammond organ in progressive rock was less due to the suitability of the instrument to the genre than to its ubiquity in popular music, much like the electric guitar. Emerson first found commercial success with the Nice, with whom he used and abused an L-100, putting knives in the instrument, setting fire to it, playing it upside down, or riding it across stage in the manner of a horse. He continued to play the instrument in this manner alongside other keyboards in Emerson, Lake and Palmer. Other prominent Hammond organists in progressive rock include Argent's Rod Argent, Yes's Tony Kaye and Rick Wakeman, Focus's Thijs van Leer, Uriah Heep's Ken Hensley, Pink Floyd's Richard Wright, Kansas's Steve Walsh and Genesis's Tony Banks. Banks later claimed he only used the Hammond because a piano was impractical to transport to gigs.

Ska and reggae music made frequent use of the Hammond throughout the 1960s and 1970s. Junior Marvin started to play the instrument after hearing Booker T & the MGs' "Green Onions", although he complained about its weight. Winston Wright was regarded in the music scene of Jamaica as one of the best organ players, and used the Hammond when performing live with Toots and the Maytals, as well as playing it on sessions with Lee "Scratch" Perry, Jimmy Cliff, and Gregory Isaacs. Tyrone Downie, best known as Bob Marley and the Wailers' keyboard player, made prominent use of the Hammond on "No Woman, No Cry", as recorded at the Lyceum Theatre, London, for the album Live!

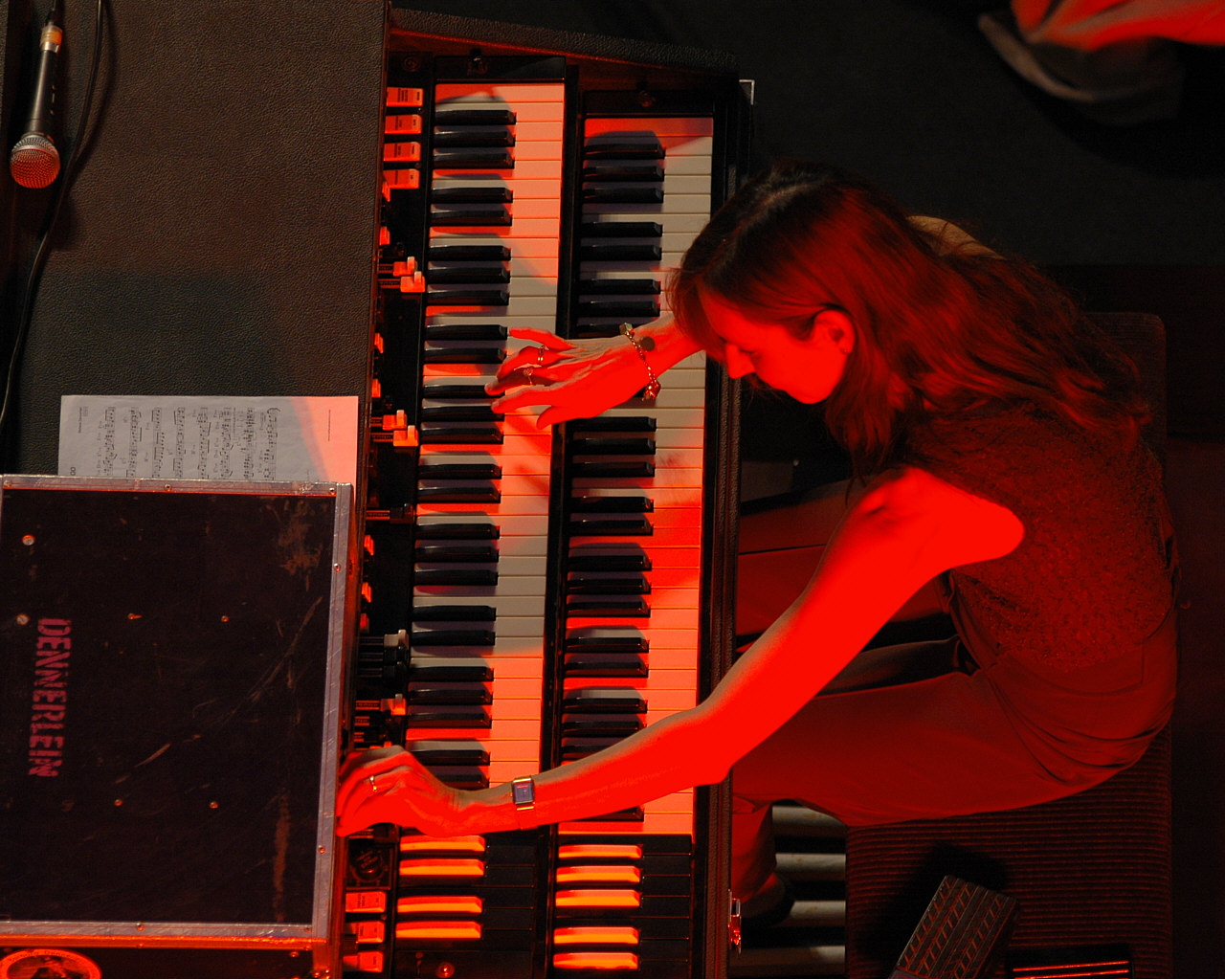
Barbara Dennerlein has been praised for her work on the Hammond's bass pedals.

The Hammond organ was perceived as outdated by the late 1970s, particularly in the UK, where it was often used to perform pop songs in social clubs. Punk and new wave bands tended to prefer second-hand combo organs from the 1960s, or use no keyboards at all. Other groups started taking advantage of cheaper and more portable synthesizers that were beginning to become available. The Stranglers' Dave Greenfield was an exception to this, and used a Hammond onstage during the band's early career. Andy Thompson, better known for being an aficionado of the Mellotron, stated, "the Hammond never really went away. There are a lot of studios that have had a B-3 or C-3 sitting away in there since the 70s." The instrument underwent a brief renaissance in the 1980s with the mod revival movement. Taylor played the Hammond through the 1980s, first with the Prisoners and later with the James Taylor Quartet. In the 1990s, Rob Collins' Hammond playing was integral to the Prisoners-influenced sound of the Charlatans. The sound of the Hammond has appeared in hip-hop music, albeit mostly via samples. A significant use is the Beastie Boys' 1992 single "So What'cha Want", which features a Hammond mixed into the foreground (the instrument was recorded live rather than being sampled).

Jazz, blues, and gospel musicians continued to use Hammond organs into the 21st century. Grammy-winning singer Twinkie Clark has been referred to as the "Queen of the B3 Hammond Organ" for her use of the instrument in her solo music compositions as well as with the Clark Sisters. Barbara Dennerlein has received critical acclaim for her performances on the Hammond, particularly her use of the bass pedals, and has modified the instrument to include samplers triggered by the pedals. Joey DeFrancesco embraced the instrument during the 1990s, and later collaborated with Jimmy Smith. He is positive about the future of the Hammond organ, saying "Everybody loves it. It makes you feel good... I think it's bigger now than ever." Grammy-winning jazz keyboardist Cory Henry learned to play the Hammond organ at age two and used it on 2016's The Revival. Lachy Doley has a Hammond organ as one of his main instruments, and has been described by Glenn Hughes as "the greatest living keyboard player in the world today" and dubbed the "Hendrix of the Hammond Organ" (an accolade also given to Emerson).

== See also ==
- Chord organ
- List of Hammond organs
- Novachord
