= Spiritualized discography =

This is the discography of the British space rock band Spiritualized.

== Albums ==
=== Studio albums ===
| Year | Album details | Peak chart positions | | | | | | | | | | Certifications (sales thresholds) |
| Year | Album details | UK | FRA | NOR | SWE | SWI | GER | BEL FL | BEL WA | US Ind. | US | Certifications (sales thresholds) |
|---|---|---|---|---|---|---|---|---|---|---|---|---|
| 1992 | Lazer Guided Melodies: Released: 30 March 1992; Label: Dedicated; Format: CD, 2×LP | 27 | — | — | — | — | — | — | — | — | | |
| 1995 | Pure Phase: Released: 28 March 1995; Label: Dedicated/Arista; Format: Sampler 12", 2×12", CD, Ltd.CD | 20 | — | — | — | — | — | — | — | — | — | |
| 1997 | Ladies and Gentlemen We Are Floating in Space: Released: 16 June 1997; Label: Dedicated/Arista; Format: Cassette, 2×12", CD, Ltd. CD, 12×3"CD | 4 | — | — | 41 | — | — | — | — | — | — | BPI: Gold |
| 2001 | Let It Come Down: Released: 17 September 2001; Label: Arista; Format: 2×LP, CD, Ltd.CD | 3 | 108 | 5 | 47 | — | — | — | — | — | 133 | BPI: Silver |
| 2003 | Amazing Grace: Released: 8 September 2003; Label: Dedicated/Arista; Format: CD, LP, 3×12" | 25 | — | — | — | — | — | — | — | — | — | |
| 2008 | Songs in A&E: Released: 26 May 2008; Label: Universal/Sanctuary; Format: CD, Book, LP | 15 | — | — | 48 | — | — | — | — | 12 | 157 | |
| 2012 | Sweet Heart Sweet Light: Released: 16 April 2012; Label: Double Six/Fat Possum; Format: CD, LP | 19 | 136 | — | 33 | — | — | — | — | 9 | 60 | |
| 2018 | And Nothing Hurt: Released: 7 September 2018; Label: Double Six/Fat Possum; Format: CD, LP, digital download | 11 | — | — | — | 92 | 60 | 76 | 97 | 7 | — | |
| 2022 | Everything Was Beautiful: Released: 22 April 2022; Label: Double Six/Fat Possum; Format: CD, LP, digital download | 5 | — | — | — | 20 | 50 | 153 | 77 | 39 | — | |

=== Live albums ===
| Title | Album details | UK Albums |
|---|---|---|
| Fucked Up Inside | Released: June 1993; Label: Dedicated; Formats: LP, CD | — |
| Royal Albert Hall October 10 1997 | Released: October 1998; Label: Dedicated; Formats: 2×LP, 2×CD | 38 |

=== Compilation albums ===
| Title | Album details |
|---|---|
| The Complete Works: Volume One | Released: March 2003; Label: Spaceman/Arista; Format: 2×CD |
| The Complete Works: Volume Two | Released: January 2004; Label: Spaceman/Arista; Format: 2×CD |

== Singles ==
| Year | Title | Peak chart positions | Album |
| Year | Title | UK | Album |
|---|---|---|---|
| 1990 | "Anyway That You Want Me" | 75 | Non-album single |
| 1991 | "Run" | 59 | Lazer Guided Melodies |
| 1991 | "Smiles" | — | Lazer Guided Melodies |
| 1992 | "I Want You" | — | Lazer Guided Melodies |
| 1992 | "Medication" | 55 | Pure Phase |
| 1993 | "Electric Mainline" | 49 | Pure Phase |
| 1995 | "Let It Flow" | 30 | Pure Phase |
| 1997 | "Electricity" | 32 | Ladies and Gentlemen We Are Floating in Space |
| 1998 | "I Think I'm in Love" | 27 | Ladies and Gentlemen We Are Floating in Space |
| 1998 | Abbey Road EP: "Come Together" / "Broken Heart" | 39 | Ladies and Gentlemen We Are Floating in Space |
| 2001 | "Stop Your Crying" | 18 | Let It Come Down |
| 2001 | "Out of Sight" | 65 | Let It Come Down |
| 2002 | "Do It All Over Again" | 31 | Let It Come Down |
| 2003 | "She Kissed Me (It Felt Like a Hit)" | 38 | Amazing Grace |
| 2004 | "Cheapster" | — | Amazing Grace |
| 2008 | "Soul on Fire" | 80 | Songs in A&E |
| 2012 | "Hey Jane" | — | Sweet Heart Sweet Light |
| 2018 | "A Perfect Miracle" / "I'm Your Man" | — | And Nothing Hurt |
| 2018 | "Here It Comes (The Road) Let's Go" | — | And Nothing Hurt |
| 2021 | "Always Together With You" | — | Everything Was Beautiful |
| 2022 | "Crazy" | — | Everything Was Beautiful |
| 2022 | "The Mainline Song" | — | Everything Was Beautiful |

== Music videos ==
| Year | Title | Director(s) | Album |
| 1990 | "Anyway That You Want Me" | Unknown | non-album |
| 1991 | "Run" | Unknown | Lazer Guided Melodies |
| 1993 | "Electric Mainline (Part 2)" | Peter Strickland | non-album |
| 1995 | "Let It Flow" | Unknown | Pure Phaze |
| 1995 | "Medication" | Unknown | Pure Phaze |
| 1997 | "Electricity" | Tobias Zaldua & Jason Pierce | Ladies and Gentlemen We Are Floating in Space |
| 1998 | "Come Together" (Re-recorded) | Baillie Walsh | Ladies and Gentlemen We Are Floating in Space |
| 2001 | "Stop Your Crying" | Jake & Jim | Let It Come Down |
| 2001 | "Out of Sight" | Juliette Larthe & Jason Pierce | Let It Come Down |
| 2002 | "Do It All Over Again" | Blue Source | Let It Come Down |
| 2003 | "She Kissed Me (It Felt Like a Hit)" | Walter Stern | Amazing Grace |
| 2004 | "Cheapster" | Ben Crook & Jason Pierce | Amazing Grace |
| 2004 | "Rated X" | Ben Crook | Amazing Grace |
| 2008 | "Soul on Fire" | Jim Canty | Songs in A&E |
| 2008 | "You Lie You Cheat" | Jake Chapman | Songs in A&E |
| 2012 | "Hey Jane" | AG Rojas | Sweet Heart Sweet Light |
| 2012 | "Little Girl" | Vincent Haycock | Sweet Heart Sweet Light |
| 2018 | "I'm Your Man" | Juliette Larthe | And Nothing Hurt |
| 2021 | "Always Together with You" | Jason Pierce | Everything Was Beautiful |
| 2022 | "The Mainline Song" | Jason Pierce | Everything Was Beautiful |
| 2022 | "Crazy" | Jason Pierce | Everything Was Beautiful |
