= Royal Albert Hall October 10 1997 =

Royal Albert Hall October 10, 1997

Live album by Spiritualized
- Released: 26 October 1998 (UK); 10 November 1998 (U.S.)
- Recorded: 10 October 1997
- Genre: Space rock, symphonic rock, gospel
- Length: 1:35:21
- Label: Dedicated
- Producer: J. Spaceman

Spiritualized chronology
Ladies and Gentlemen We Are Floating in Space (1997)	Royal Albert Hall October 10, 1997 (1998)	Let It Come Down (2001)

Professional ratings
Review scores
Source	Rating
AllMusic	4/5 stars

Royal Albert Hall October 10, 1997 is a live album by the English space rock group Spiritualized, recorded during an October show at the Royal Albert Hall in London as part of their 1997 tour of the United Kingdom. The album was released in late 1998.

This was the last album recorded with the original Spiritualized line-up before frontman Jason Pierce sacked every member apart from keyboardist Thighpaulsandra and saxophonist Ray Dickaty.

The six-piece band are joined by a horn section, string quartet and members of the London Community Gospel Choir on disc two, with 19 members in total. This expanded version of Spiritualized headlined Glastonbury in 1998, and was also filmed on Later... with Jools Holland. This orchestral line-up signalled the dense musical style to come on their next album Let It Come Down, released 3 years later. The cover photograph is taken from 8,000 feet (2.4 km) above the Royal Albert Hall by Farrow Design.

The majority of the setlist comes from Ladies And Gentlemen We Are Floating In Space, their third album, with some material from their previous albums, Lazer Guided Melodies and Pure Phase. "Walking With Jesus" was a Spacemen 3 song from The Perfect Prescription, but Pierce has performed it throughout his career. Here is its second official live release, the first being on the limited edition live release Fucked Up Inside in 1993.

== Track listing ==
=== Disc one (45:59) ===
1. "Intro" – 4:18
2. "Shine a Light" – 7:11
3. "Electric Mainline" – 7:01
4. "Electricity" – 3:25
5. "Home of the Brave" – 3:31
6. "The Individual" – 2:57
7. "Medication" – 6:37
8. "Walking with Jesus" – 4:18
9. "Take Your Time" – 6:44

=== Disc two (49:16) ===
1. "No God Only Religion" – 4:02
2. "Broken Heart" – 5:47
3. "Come Together" – 7:00
4. "I Think I'm in Love" – 10:05
5. "Cop Shoot Cop..." – 16:33
6. "Oh Happy Day" – 5:52

All songs written by Jason Pierce, except:

- "Walking with Jesus" by Peter Kember and Jason Pierce
- "Oh Happy Day" by Philip Doddridge and Edward Francis Rimbault

== Personnel ==
Spiritualized

- J Spaceman – Fender Thinline guitar, vocals
- Sean Cook – Fender Jazz bass guitar, harmonica
- Michael Mooney – Les Paul guitar, bass guitar
- Damon Reece – Gretsch Round Badge drums
- Thighpaulsandra – piano, Hammond C3
- Raymond (Moonshake) Dickaty – tenor saxophone, flute

Additional

- Choir director: John Fisher
- Soprano singers: Michelle Parkinson, Maulin Fisher, Denise Seally, Naterlie Goode
- Alto singers: Janice Whyne, Rhoda Fisher, Samantha McCrae
- Tenor singers: Jason Thompson, Leon Brown, Paul Bernard, Tony Clarke
- Horns: Tony Robinson, Rob Charles, Don Owen, Kevin Brown
- Strings: Jules Singleton, Sally Herbert, Jocelyn Pook, Dinah Beamish
