= Moles (nightclub) =

Nightclub in Bath, UK

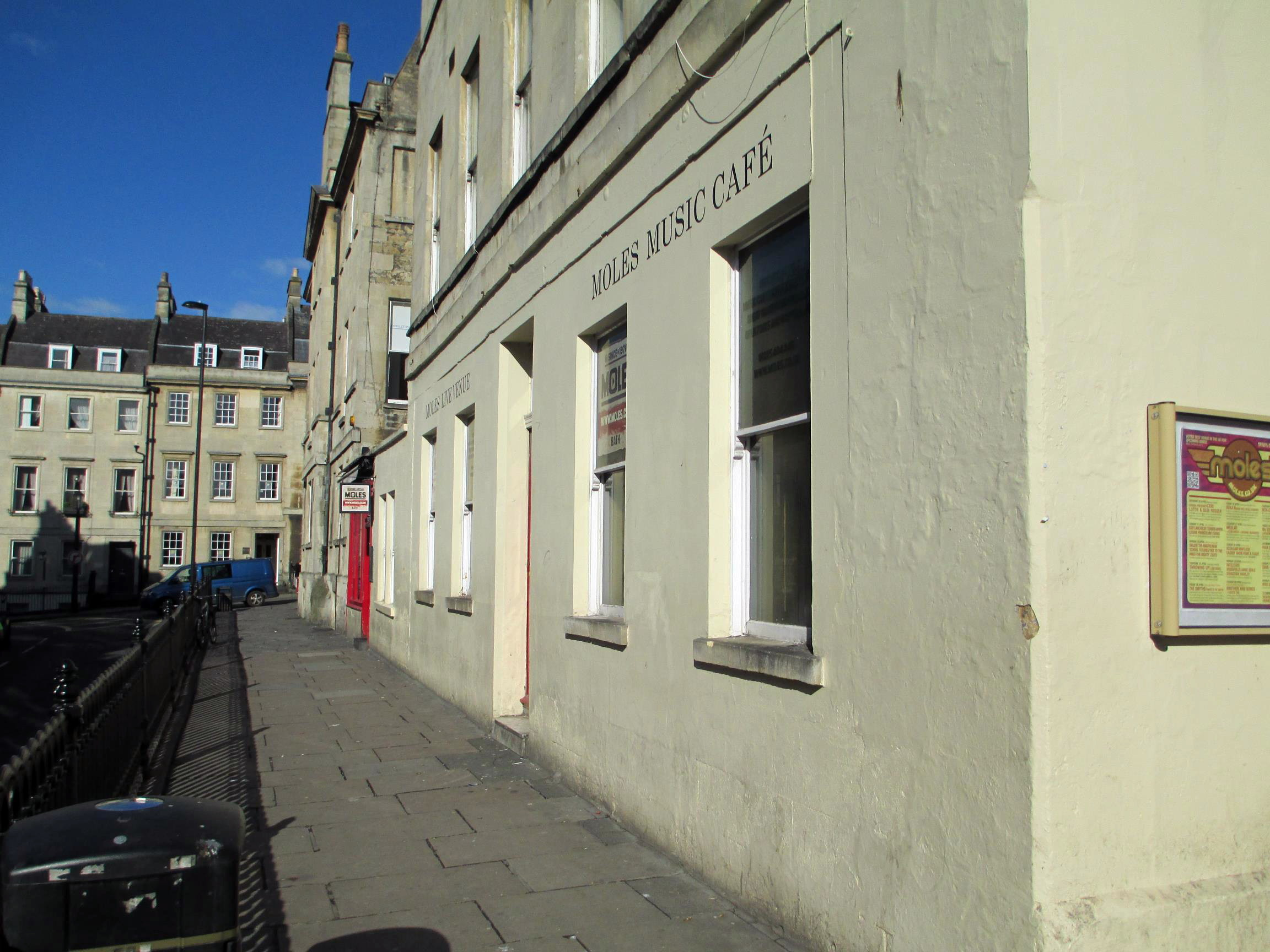
- Moles upper floor
- Interactive map of Moles
- Address: 14 George Street, Bath, Somerset, BA1 2EN; Bath, Somerset; United Kingdom
- Coordinates: 51.3847813°N 2.3631025°W
- Operator: Phil Andrews (1977 - 2009) (2009 - 2012) Ric Yerbury (2012 - 2023) Tom Maddicott (2012 - 2023)
- Capacity: 220
- Type: Nightclub

Construction
- Opened: 31 December 1977
- Closed: 5 December 2023

Website
- https://www.moles.co.uk

Moles was a live music venue and nightclub in Bath, Somerset with a capacity of 320 people. It was opened by Philip Andrews on New Year's Eve 1977. It was known as a grassroots venue and hosted many music acts before they became household names, such as Oasis, Ed Sheeran, the Killers, Radiohead, the Cure, King Crimson, Eurythmics, and Supergrass. Moles closed and filed for insolvency in December 2023.

== History ==
Moles was founded by Philip Andrews, who was also the director of the venue. He was the club's director from 1977 to 2009. Andrews was disappointed at the 'Euro disco crap', and he and a friend thought that Bath needed a good club. He wanted to have a club with "real ale, veggie food and live music". The landlord of the venue (which had previously been Six of Clubs), heard about Andrews' idea and gave him 10 days to decide whether he wanted to take on turning the venue into a club. In October 1977 Andrews spent £2,000 to renovate the venue, which was derelict. The venue had not been in use for approximately five years.

Moles opened on New Year's Eve 1977. In the evenings it was a nightclub, and during the day it was a vegetarian cafe. The cafe was originally more popular than the club; however, facing competition from other cafes, Andrews closed the cafe business in 1981.

The initial bookings of live music came from Andrews' own music taste, which was 'very folky jazzy'. Approximately nine months to a year after opening, Andrews began booking other types of music: this included a disco night known as 'Derek's Mutant Disco', on a Wednesday night.

He also booked Canadian new wave band, Spoons (despite Andrews' concern of the band being 'a bit wild'). Prior to hosting the Spoons, Moles wasn't attracting large audiences. After the Spoons performance Andrews realized that rock music could attract large crowds. The PA system was upgraded and Andrews' said Moles, "really started taking off".

After visiting the cafe, Robert Fripp, future guitarist of King Crimson, decided he wanted his band the League of Gentlemen to perform at the venue. After the performance London booking agents began calling Moles to book bands, including the Cure and the Smiths. When the Cure played at the venue, the club did not have a stage, and the toilets were located behind the band. Andrews' often stood near to the keyboard player to ensure that he wasn't bumped into when people tried to get to the toilet. A small crowd of almost 30 people watched the Smiths perform at the venue at the start of their career. The band, Oasis performed at the venue, however, Andrews almost turned them down, because their manager had previously provided poor recommendations for Moles to hire other artists.

A recording studio was created upstairs at the venue, and artists such as James, Portishead, Spiritualised and Biffy Clyro recording there. The studio allowed for live albums to be created from the live performances below. The venue also hosted club nights, including the long-running 'Big Chees' event on a Tuesday night.

In 2009, Andrews sold Moles to focus on The Porter pub that he owned next door to the venue. The pub provided music and comedy, as well as vegetarian food. In 2012, Moles declared bankruptcy. However, Andrews returned to the venue, with a new business partner, Tom Maddicott, who became the managing director. Maddicott had been involved with Moles since he was 18 years old in 1992, and he once served as an assistant manager, a DJ and a record producer. Prior to bankruptcy, the pair set up a limited company, meaning they were ready when Moles went bankrupt, a move that Andrews described as 'totally seamless'.

== Recording studio ==
Moles has been used as a recording studio, with Dummy, Lazer Guided Melodies, Ladies and Gentlemen We Are Floating in Space, and Primary Colours being recorded here.

== Electrical fire and refurbishment ==
Moles closed for 21 months following a fire caused by an electrical fault in March 2014. At approximately 08:50GMT, a member of the public called Avon Fire and Rescue Service after hearing the fire alarm and seeing smoke from the venue. It was initially reported that members of a band had been asleep on an upper floor, however, a search revealed no-one was present.

The club was restored, which was challenging as a result of the building being listed for sale. The restoration work took 21 months; including the installation of a new digital mixing desk. The club opened again in November 2015, with Don Broco headlining, followed by a club night from Eats Everything and Erol Alkan on 27 November.

== Closure ==
In October 2023 the nightclub's operations manager said that it was struggling due to the 2021–present United Kingdom cost-of-living crisis, and in December 2023 it closed after filing for insolvency. In 2023, more than 120 grassroots venues similar to Moles closed, with 84 described as 'in crisis'. Member of Parliament for Bath, Wera Hobhouse called for a parliamentary debate on the closure of grassroots music venues, and a petition calling for the local authority to preserve the venue was also launched.

After the venue’s closure, an application was made to Bath and North East Somerset Council for Moles to be given Asset of Community Value status. This would allow the venue to be protected in the event the building was sold and would have potentially brought Moles back.

On 3 April 2024, Maddicott announced that Bath and North East Somerset Council had not voted in favour of an application to give the venue Asset of Community Value status. Maddicott, via Moles’ Instagram account stated that: “…this really is the final nail in the coffin”.

== Notable performances ==
- In 1990, Van Morrison performed and recorded Cuchulainn, a collection of poems from ancient Ireland as a fundraiser for Moles.
- In 1991, Strangelove played their first gig in Moles.
- Ed Sheeran performed at Moles in June 2011, shortly before the release of his debut album, +.
- Manic Street Preachers were signed to a record label after performing at Moles.
- Tears For Fears were a regular band at the venue.
- Annie Mac regularly performed at the venue and used to be a resident DJ.
- Radiohead had a memorable gig at the venue, leading to their manager telling them they'd have to change, due to a bad performance.
- Supergrass performed at the venue approximately six or seven times, with the crowds growing at each gig. The last few gigs they performed there led to tickets selling out months in advance. The band released an album for their debut album's 20th anniversary, including a free bonus CD entitled 'Live at Moles'. The back of the album cover of their debut album, I Should Coco, was taken in the old dressing room at the venue.
- King Crimson recorded Discipline: Live At Moles Club, Bath 1981, releasing the album in 2000.
- Fatboy Slim performed at Mole's 40th birthday on New Year's Eve in 2018.
- The last band to perform at Moles was October Drift, on December 2, 2023.

== Wall of Fame ==
The venue had a 'Wall of Fame' adjacent to the upstairs bar, with the names of all the bands and artists that had performed there over the years.

List of artists/bands who have appeared on the Wall of Fame at Moles (having performed at the venue)
A	B	C	D	E	F	G	H	I	J	K	L	M	N	O	P	R	S	T	U	V	W	Y	(Numbers)
A Flock of Seagulls	Babybird	Cactus Rain	Dada	Eat	Fad Gadget	Gabrielle	The Heart Throbs	Ian McNabb	J.J	Kamanchi Sly	The Larks	Magma Pop	Nan Vernon	Oasis	Pale Saints	Radiohead	S*M*A*S*H	Tabitha Zu	U.K. Subs	Vic Chesnutt	The Weather Prophets	Younger Younger 28s	The 5,6,7,8s
A House	Baby Chaos	The Candyskins	Daisy Chainsaw	Echobelly	Family Gotown	Gary Clail	Heaven West Eleven	Innes Sibun Blues Explosion	James	Kenikie King	The La's	Manic Street Preachers	Natural Life	Ocean Colour Scene	Paris Angels	The Railway Children	Sam Brown	Tansies	Ultramarine	The Voice of the Beehive	The Wedding Present	Yungun	
Add N to (X)	The Band of Holy Joy	Candyland	Damian Rice	Ed Keeper	The Fat Lady Sings	Geno Washington	The High	Intastella	James Rays Gangway	Keziah Jones	Laura Veirs and the Tortured Souls	Mansun	Nautical William	Oil Experts	Patricia Morrison	The Real People	Santa Cruz	Tasmin Archer	Ultrasound		Whiteout		
Alabama 3	Banderas	Carl Cox	The Damned	Eddi Reader	The Fatima Mansions	The Go-Betweens	Higher Intelligence Agency	Into Paradise	James Taylor Quartet	King Crimson	Lemon Grass	Marcella Detroit	Neds Atomic Dustbin	One Dove	Paul Johnson	Red Lorry Yellow Lorry	Scorpio Rising	Tears For Fears	Underground Lovers		Wolf Alice		
Alex Paterson	Bang Bang Machine	Cast	David Devant & His Spirit Wife	Editors	Felt	The God Machine	The Hollow Men	It Bites	Jane Siberia	Kingmaker	Les Négresses Vertes	Marillion	No Man	Oui 3	Pele	Reef	The Seers	Terry Hall	Urban Species		Whycliffe		
Amazulu	The Bardots	Catatonia	David Gray	Elastica	Fields of the Nephilim	Goldblade	Holly Golightly		Jason Rebello	Kinky Machine	The Liac Time	Massive Attack		The Open	Pere Ubu	Rummy Ongala	Senation (Ex Soul Family Senatio)	Thirteen Senses			Wild Willy Barrett		
Amoeba Assassins	Barenaked Ladies	Cath Coffey	Deacon Blue	EMF	Five Thirty	Goya Dress	Honky		The Jazz Butcher	Kitchens of Distinction	Linoleum	MC Tunes			Peter Green	Revolutionary Dub Warriors	Senseless Things	Thompson Twins			The Woodentops		
Andrew Weatherill	Bark Psychosis	Catherine Wheel	Dead Can Dance	Engine Alley	Flowered Up	Grand Rose Band	Horse		JC001	Klashnekoff	Londonbeat	Mega City Four			Peter Hammill	Revolver	Sensitize	Thousand Yard Stare			World Party		
Andy Sheppard	Bassomatic	Chapterhouse	Del Amitri	The Europeans	FMB	Green on Red	Hothouse Flowers		Jeh	Kula Shaker	Lost Soul	Merz			Phranc	Richard and Linda Thompson	Shakespears Sister	Thrum					
Andy Smith (Portishead)	Bedazzled	Chikinki	Des'ree	Eurtythmics	Foreign Beggars	Greg Johnson	The House of Love		Jehst	The Killers	Lovecraft	Microdisney			PJ Harvey	River City People	The Shamen	Timbuk 3					
Asian Dub Foundation	Beverley Craven	Children of Dub	Dick Heksall-Smith	Everything but the Girl	The Four Brothers	Groove Detective	The Housemartins		Jellyfish		Lupine Howl	Microgroove			Pooka	Roachford	Shed Seven	Tiny Monroe					
The Auteurs	Beverly Knight	China Crisis	Diesel Park West		Frank Chickens	The Good Gods!	Howard Jones		Jennifers		Lush	Midway Still			Popinjays	Rob da Bank	Shriekback	Tom Robinson					
	The Bible	Claytown Troupe	The Dirtbombs		Frazier Chorus		Howlin Wilf and the Vee-Jays		Jesus Jones			The Mighty Lemon Drops			Post War Years	Robert Fripp	Six by Seven	Tori Amos					
	Birdland	Clint Boon	DJ Dopey (World DJ Champion 2002)		Freak Power		Hugh Cornwell		Jimmy Katumba & The Ebonies			Mike Peters & The Poets			The Power of Dreams	The Rockingbirds	Skinnyman	Torah Wilcox					
	Bivouac	Coati Mundi	Doctor and the Medics		Frente!				JJ72			Million Dan			Primal Scream	Rodney P	Skunk Anansie	T'Pau					
	Bjorn Again	Colorblind James Experience	Dodgy		Fretblanket				JoBoxers			Milltown Brothers			The Primitives	Rootjoose	Slaves	The Tragically Hip					
	Blab Happy	Comanchee Park	Dr Robert		Fun-Da-Mental				John Cooper Clarke			Mint 400			The Proclaimers	Roy Harper	Sleeper	Trashcan Sinatras					
	Black Roots	Cooper Temple	Dedge		Furniture				John Etheridge			Miranda Sex Garden			Propellorheads	Ruff Ruff & Ready	Slow Bongo Floyd	Travis					
	Black Star Liner	The Clause	Dust Junkies						John Otway			Miss World			Pulp	Ruthless Rap Assassins	The Smiths	The Triffids					
	The Black Velvet Band	Courtney Pine	The Dylans						Jonathan Richmond			The Mock Turtles					The Snapdragons	Ty					
	Band	Crazyhead	The Dears						Justin Robertson			Molly Half Head					Sneaker Pimps						
	Blancmange	Crop-dusters	Delays									Moloko					Snow Patrol						
	Bleach	Cud										Mumford & Sons					Soda						
	Blessed Ethel	The Cure										My Vitriol					The Soup Dragons						
	The Blessing	Curiosity Killed the Cat										Mystro					Spiritualised						
	Blink	Cutmaster Swift (World DJ Champion 1989)										The Mutts					Spitfire						
	Bloomsday	Cutting Crew															Squarepusher						
	The Blow Monkeys	The Coral															The Star Club						
	The Blue Aeroplanes																Starjuice						
	Blur																Stereolab						
	Brian Kennedy																Strangelove						
	The Brilliant Corners																Straw						
	Bronte Brothers																Strawberry Switchblade						
																	Suede						
																	The Sultans of Ping						
																	The Sundays						
																	Sunshot						
																	Supergrass						
																	Surreal Madrid						
																	Suzanne Rhatigan						
																	Sway						
																	Sweetmouth						
																	Swervedriver						
																	Symposium						
