= Bedazzled =

Bedazzled may refer to:

- Bedazzled (1967 film), a British comedy starring Peter Cook and Dudley Moore
- Bedazzled (2000 film), a remake of the 1967 film
- Bedazzled (band), a British band
- Bedazzled Records, a record label
