= Amazing Grace (Spiritualized album) =

Studio album by Spiritualized
- Released: 8 September 2003
- Genre: Garage rock; gospel
- Length: 42:49
- Label: Dedicated Records
- Producer: J. Spaceman

Spiritualized chronology
The Complete Works (2003)	Amazing Grace (2003)	Songs in A&E (2008)

Singles from Amazing Grace
- 1. "She Kissed Me (It Felt Like a Hit)" Released: 1 September 2003; 2. "Cheapster" Released: 16 February 2004

Professional ratings
Aggregate scores
Source	Rating
Metacritic	68/100
Review scores
Source	Rating
AllMusic	3.5/5 stars
Blender	2/5 stars
Entertainment Weekly	B+
The Guardian	4/5 stars
Mojo	4/5 stars
Pitchfork	6.2/10
Q	2/5 stars
Rolling Stone	2/5 stars
Spin	A−
Uncut	4/5 stars

Amazing Grace is the fifth studio album by the British rock band Spiritualized, so named to indicate its considerable gospel influence. Although the title hymn does not appear on the album (Spiritualized have covered it previously, and released a free-jazz version as a b-side in 2001, and also on The Complete Works Vol. 2), the ballad "Hold On" is based upon the same melody, and the opening track "This Little Life of Mine" is clearly indebted to the spiritual "This Little Light of Mine".

After working with free-jazz collective Spring Heel Jack on one of their albums and tour, frontman Jason Pierce was inspired to make a record with the same principles. His approach meant that the rest of Spiritualized was given the songs on the same day as they were recorded, meaning the record (including orchestral overdubs) was completed in 3 weeks. This is a huge difference compared to its predecessor, Let It Come Down, which took four years to record.

The album is generally harder-edged than its predecessors, featuring a number of variations on the familiar Spiritualized "Electricity" garage-rock riff. Conversely, "The Ballad of Richie Lee" is a tender, organ-driven tribute to Richie Lee, the lead singer of the American group Acetone, a friend of Pierce, who committed suicide in 2001. The song was used in the final scene of the film The Unloved, whose director, actress Samantha Morton, is a close friend of Pierce's.

Two singles were released, "She Kissed Me (It Felt Like a Hit)" and "Cheapster". The former song's title is a reference to the song "He Hit Me (It Felt Like a Kiss)" by the 1960s girl group The Crystals, and the latter's is a likely reference to T. Rex's "Jeepster".

The world tour following the album's release culminated in a headline slot on The Other Stage at Glastonbury 2004 and a support slot for Primal Scream at Brixton Academy, for the Hoping Foundation charity concert, later released on DVD.

The closing track on the album, "Lay It Down Slow", was used in the Series Finale of the American TV show Prison Break.

== Track listing ==
All songs written by J Spaceman.

No.	Title	Length
1.	"This Little Life of Mine"	4:00
2.	"She Kissed Me (It Felt Like a Hit)"	3:27
3.	"Hold On"	3:54
4.	"Oh Baby"	4:10
5.	"Never Goin' Back"	2:53
6.	"The Power and the Glory"	4:30
7.	"Lord Let It Rain on Me"	3:42
8.	"The Ballad of Richie Lee"	3:25
9.	"Cheapster"	2:39
10.	"Rated X"	5:19
11.	"Lay It Down Slow"	5:00
Total length:		42:49

== Personnel ==
Spiritualized

- Spaceman – Epiphone Casino, Fender Jaguar, Fender Thinline, Martin 003 acoustic, Fender Telecaster, hammer dulcimer, Farfisa Compact, banjo, Fender Precision Bass, piano, bell, Radioshack
- Tom Edwards – sleigh bells, piano, maracas, tambourine, marimba, tubular bells, timpani, Radioshack, Vox Continental, Farfisa Compact, foot stamps, vibraphone, Optigan
- Kevin Bales – Gretsch drums
- Doggen – Precision Bass, Fender Jaguar, Gibson Gold Top 57, Fender Jazzmaster, Rickenbacker 39 lapsteel, Fender Bass VI, harmonica, Gibson Les Paul Custom
- Thighpaulsandra – Vox Continental, Kurtzweil, Rhodes, Hammond C3, piano
- John Coxon – Gibson Firebird V, Fender Telecaster, Gibson Firebird III, harmonica, autoharp, Fender Bass VI, Martin D21, Hammond B3, piano, Fender Rhodes

Additional musicians

- Jonny Aitken - drums
- Evan Parker - saxophone
- Kenny Wheeler - trumpet
- Jonathon Morcambe - French horn
- Ray Dickaty - saxophone
- Dave Temple - saxophone
- Ben Edwards - trumpet
- Nick Smart - trumpet
- James Adams - trombone
- Nick Sweeney - violin
- Fay Sweet - violin
- Tony Woollard - cello
- Angie Brown - vocals
- Lauraine McIntosh - vocals
- Mary Pearce - vocals
