= Sweet Heart Sweet Light =

Studio album by Spiritualized
- Released: 16 April 2012
- Genre: Art rock; neo-psychedelia; garage rock; indie rock; gospel
- Length: 59:30
- Label: Double Six
- Producer: Jason Pierce

Spiritualized chronology
Songs in A&E (2008)	Sweet Heart Sweet Light (2012)	And Nothing Hurt (2018)

Sweet Heart Sweet Light is the seventh studio album by Spiritualized. It was released on 16 April 2012, on Double Six Records.

== Recording and release ==
The band spent two years recording the album, in three different cities, and frontman Jason Pierce spent another year mixing it at home. Spiritualized previewed the record live, playing it in its entirety during a show at the Royal Albert Hall on 11 October 2011. Sweet Heart Sweet Light featured contributions from Pierce's 11-year-old daughter Poppy Spaceman, as well as contributions from the Icelandic band Amiina. Jason Pierce revealed in an interview that the album will "embrace" more poppy songs. Jason Pierce also stated that the album was partly inspired by the experiences of performing Ladies and Gentlemen We Are Floating in Space live in its entirety.

Sweet Heart Sweet Light was originally going to be called Huh? Pierce was taking medication for liver disease while writing the album, and the original title was a reference to the effects the medicine had on Pierce's mind.

The first song released from the album was "Hey Jane". A music video for "Hey Jane" was released on 19 March 2012. The video has caused controversy over its violent content.

In 2012 it was awarded a silver certification from the Independent Music Companies Association which indicated sales of at least 20,000 copies throughout Europe.

== Reception ==
Professional ratings
Aggregate scores
Source	Rating
AnyDecentMusic?	7.4/10
Metacritic	81/100
Review scores
Source	Rating
AllMusic	3/5 stars
The A.V. Club	B+
Chicago Tribune	3/4 stars
Entertainment Weekly	A−
The Guardian	4/5 stars
The Independent	4/5 stars
NME	7/10
Pitchfork	8.8/10
Rolling Stone	3.5/5 stars
Spin	8/10

Sweet Heart Sweet Light has received critical acclaim. From a collected 38 reviews, the review website Metacritic gives the album a score of 81 out of 100, indicating "universal acclaim". Pitchfork's Ryan Dombal gave the album a "Best New Album" designation, calling it Pierce's most uplifting album of his career. In another positive review, BBC Music's Chris Lo wrote "For every diehard fan there's someone else wondering what all the fuss is about. Sweet Heart Sweet Light, Spiritualized's seventh studio album, isn't going to change any of that." Lo concluded: "...it's a Spiritualized album, and a great one." Rob Hakimian also praised the album, writing "All ten of the songs here are grandiose and muscular in the great tradition of Spiritualized songs, doing away entirely with the fragility that cropped up on songs like "Death Take Your Fiddle" from their last album."

Not all reviews were positive. In a more mixed review, Drowned in Sound's Didz Hammond wrote: "It is, all in all, a pretty solid front half of a Spiritualized album that sort of transmits intermittently in the middle and then totally falls on its arse for the last three tracks." Harry Sword of The Quietus gave the album a negative review, writing "Not only does Sweet Heart Sweet Light hit all patented Spiritualized thematic buttons squarely between the eyes – religion, drugs, sickness and redemption – it is also a record that covers everything with a Wyoming sized scoop of full-fat icky sentiment." Sword concluded: "And where previous lyrical excesses have often been tempered by a genius for tension building arrangement, the overriding vibe on Sweet Heart Sweet Light is that of bloated self-parody, and gratuitous self-pity."

The album was listed 20th on Stereogum's list of top 50 albums of 2012.

== Track listing ==
All songs written by Jason Pierce except where noted.

1. "Huh? (Intro)" – 1:00
2. "Hey Jane" – 8:51
3. "Little Girl" – 3:43
4. "Get What You Deserve" – 6:47
5. "Too Late" – 3:45
6. "Headin' for the Top Now" – 8:22
7. "Freedom" – 4:31
8. "I Am What I Am" (Pierce, Dr. John) – 4:37
9. "Mary" – 6:11
10. "Life Is a Problem" – 4:02
11. "So Long You Pretty Thing" (Pierce, Poppy Spaceman) – 7:49

== Personnel ==
The following people contributed to Sweet Heart Sweet Light.

=== Musicians ===
==== Spiritualized ====
- J. Spaceman – vocals, Fender Thinline, Fender Jaguar, Fender Jazzmaster, Vox Starstream, Farfisa, melodica, harmonica, glockenspiel, Gibson L/00 acoustic
- Tony 'Doggen' Foster – Gibson Les Paul Goldtop, Fender Jazzmaster, Fender Precision Bass, Fender VI
- Kevin Bales – Gretch Round Badge, Hayman Vibrasonic, Zildjian cymbals
- Tom Edwards – piano, Hammond organ, Fender Rhodes, Farfisa Compact, Vox Continental, Elka organ, percussion, timpani

==== Additional musicians ====
- Poppy Spaceman – vocals on "Headin' for the Top Now" and "So Long You Pretty Thing"
- John Coxon – Gibson Firebird
- Romeo Stodart – banjo, Gibson 335, vocals on "Freedom"
- SJ Selby, Laura Dickenson, Melanie Nyema – vocals (LA)
- Claudia Smith – vocals (UK)
- Maria Huld Markan Sigfúsdóttir, Hildur Ársælsdóttir, Edda Rún Ólafsdóttir, Sólrún Sumarliðadóttir: String quartet (Iceland)
- Emily Pringle, Sali-Wyn Ryan, Henrietta Ridgeon, Laura Anstee – string quartet (London)
- Hildur Ársælsdóttir – saw
- Ben Edwards – trumpet
- James Adams – trombone, bass trombone
- Finn Peters – tenor saxophone, flute
- Evan Parker – alto saxophone
- Tony Bevan – tenor saxophone
- Roundhouse Choir – Osnat Schmool (director), Rathi Kumar (assistant director), Ashleigh Thompson, Bukky Abdul, Cathy Manning, Deborah Wilkes, Ian Jeanes, James Dee, Jeanette Bossman, Karyma Ellis, Kat Koch, Lauren Dyer, Louise Murphy, Lucy Bryant, Monika Pomeroy, Nicola Simpson, Phoenix Martins, Pippasha Khan, Rosie Blissett, Sandra Townsend, Sarah Dean, Sarah Wright, Simon Prag, Stefan Vitalis, Stuart Homer-Wright, Victoria Owusu, Usman Saidu

=== Additional personnel ===
- Mixed by J. Spaceman and James Aparicio
- Post-production by J. Spaceman and Rupert Clervaux
- Recording engineers:
  - Tim Lewis (Wales)
  - Scott Hackwith and Héctor Espinosa (LA)
  - Birgir Jón Birgisson (Reykjavik)
  - Anthony Leung and James Aparicio (London)
- Mastered by Bob Ludwig

== Charts ==
Chart performance for Sweet Heart Sweet Light
Chart (2012)	Peak position
French Albums (SNEP)	136
Swedish Albums (Sverigetopplistan)	33
UK Albums (OCC)	19
US Billboard 200	60
US Independent Albums (Billboard)	9
US Top Alternative Albums (Billboard)	16
US Top Rock Albums (Billboard)	24
