= All My Tears =

All My Tears may refer to:

- All My Tears, an album by Alton Ellis
- "All My Tears", a song by Julie Miller with Emmylou Harris, covered by Harris and separately covered by Jimmy Scott, Ane Brun, and Jars of Clay

== See also ==
- "All of My Tears", a song by Spiritualized, a non-album B-side from Ladies and Gentlemen We Are Floating in Space
