= The Complete Works (album series) =

Compilation album series by Spiritualized
- Released: 15 April 2003 (Volume One); 10 February 2004 (Volume Two)
- Genres: Space rock, shoegaze, ambient, drone
- Length: 139:18 (Volume One); 124:27 (Volume Two)
- Label: Arista

Spiritualized chronology
Let It Come Down (2001)	The Complete Works (2003)	Amazing Grace (2003)

Volume Two

Professional ratings
Review scores
Source	Rating
AllMusic	4/5 stars
Pitchfork	(8.6/10)

The Complete Works is a two-volume compilation album series of the titular complete works of space rock group Spiritualized. The first volume was released in 2003 and the second in 2004.

== Track listing ==
All songs were written by J. Spaceman, unless otherwise noted.

=== Volume One ===
Disc one

1. "Anyway That You Want Me" (Chip Taylor) - 6:29
2. "Step into The Breeze (Part 1)" - 2:48
3. "Feel So Sad (7-inch single version)" - 5:34
4. "Feel So Sad (Rhapsodies)" - 13:19
5. "Feel So Sad (Glides and Chimes)" - 6:34
6. "Run (Single Version)" (J. J. Cale/Spaceman) - 3:12
7. "Luminescence (Stay With Me)" - 5:08
8. "I Want You" (Feel So Sad B-Side Version) - 3:45
9. "Effervescent (Chimes)" - 7:13
10. "Why Don't You Smile Now" (John Cale/Terry Philips/Lou Reed/Jerry Vance) - 5:45
11. "Sway" (Mark Refoy/Spaceman) - 6:53

Disc two

1. "100 Bars" (Accapella) - 4:16
2. "I Want You" (Run B-Side Version) - 3:56
3. "You Know It's True" (Instrumental) - 3:40
4. "Medication" (Medication EP Version) - 8:16
5. "Smiles" (Medication Promo Single Version) - 5:28
6. "Angel Sigh" (Medication EP Version) - 4:44
7. "Feel So Sad" (Medication EP Version) - 8:08
8. "Good Dope/Good Fun" - 3:51
  - this track, though listed as the instrumental appearing on the Greenpeace split 7-inch, is in fact the EP mix or, as it was titled on US promo singles, the "Alternate Edited Master Version" of "Lay Back in the Sun")
9. "Lay Back in the Sun" (Electric Mainline EP Version) - 3:48
10. "Good Times" (Electric Mainline EP Version) - 4:10
11. "Electric Mainline (Part 1)" - 7:49
12. "Electric Mainline (Part 2)" - 8:41
13. "100 Bars (Flashback)" - 5:57

=== Volume Two ===
Disc one

1. "Let it Flow" – 5:31
2. "Don't Go/Stay with Me" – 6:05
3. "Don't Go/Stay with Me (The Individual)" – 4:39
4. "Broken Heart (Instrumental) (Japanese Version)" – 8:09
5. "Lay Back in the Sun (Single Version)" – 3:44
6. "Cool Waves (Instrumental)" – 3:06
7. "Electricity" – 3:49
8. "Spread Your Wings (Instrumental)" – 6:17
9. "Come Together" – 3:22
10. "I Think I'm in Love (Radio Edit)" – 3:58
11. "Broken Heart" – 3:46
12. "The X-Files Theme" (Mark Snow) – 3:34
13. "Broken Heart (Instrumental)" – 4:18

Disc two

1. "Stop Your Crying" – 5:15
2. "Anything More (Instrumental)" – 3:10
3. "Rock and Roll" – 3:30
4. "Out of Sight" – 6:09
5. "I Didn't Mean to Hurt You (Instrumental)" – 5:12
6. "Going Down Slow" – 3:55
7. "Do it All Over Again" – 3:47
8. "On Fire (Live)" – 7:21
9. "Amazing Grace (Peace on Earth)" (Traditional) – 7:02
10. "Do it All Over Again (Live)" – 7:03
11. "Come Together (Live)" – 4:16
12. "Going Down Slow (Instrumental)" – 3:55
13. "Rock and Roll (Instrumental)" – 3:31
