= The Hollow Men (band) =

British indie band

The Hollow Men were a British indie band from Leeds, England. The group named itself after the poem by T. S. Eliot. The members were David Ashmoore on vocals, Choque on guitar, Howard Taylor on bass, Brian E Roberts on guitar and Jonny Cragg on drums. Between 1985 and 1994 The Hollow Men released four albums and several singles.

Starting out as a two-piece for the first single "Late Flowering Lust" (featuring session bassist John Dean) David Ashmoore (David Owen) and Choque (who was previously in Leeds band Salvation) were joined by permanent bassist Howard Taylor for debut album Tales of the Riverbank released on their own Evensong record label.

The trio recorded another album The Man Who Would Be King again on Evensong before drummer Jonny Cragg, who had guested on the album and guitarist Brian E. Roberts, a former bandmate of Taylor's when they were in The Passmore Sisters together, joined.

They signed to Arista Records in 1988 and released their debut single, "White Train", which was a remixed version of the song that originally appeared on The Man Who Would Be King album. In December 1989, the British music magazine, NME reported that The Hollow Men, along with others such as Carter the Unstoppable Sex Machine and The Charlatans, were their pick as 'stars of tomorrow'. The only album the band recorded for Arista was Cresta released in 1990. The band split up in 1991.

The album Twisted made up from unreleased, demo and live tracks was released in the US only on November Records in 1994.

== Discography ==
=== Albums ===
Year	Title	Record label	Chart positions	
Year	Title	Record label	UK Albums Chart	U.S. Pop Albums Chart
1986	Tales of the Riverbank	Dead Man's Curve		
1988	The Man Who Would Be King	Dead Man's Curve		
1990	Cresta	Evensong, Arista BMG		
1994	Twisted	November Records		

=== EPs and singles ===
Year	Title	Record label	Chart positions	
Year	Title	Record label	UK Singles Chart	US Modern Rock
1985	Late Flowering Lust	Evensong		
1987	Gold and Ivory	Evensong		
1989	The Drowning Man	Blind Eye Records		
1989	White Train	Evensong, Arista BMG		
1990	The Moons a Balloon	Evensong, Arista BMG		
1991	November Comes	Evensong, Arista BMG		16
1991	Pink Panther	Evensong, Arista BMG		
1991	Live EP (promo only)	Evensong, Arista BMG		
