= Songs in A&E =

Studio album by Spiritualized
- Released: 26 May 2008
- Recorded: Cedars, Nottingham
- Genres: Art rock; neo-psychedelia; garage rock; gospel
- Length: 51:39
- Labels: Sanctuary (UK); Fontana (US)
- Producer: Jason Pierce

Spiritualized chronology
Amazing Grace (2003)	Songs in A&E (2008)	Sweet Heart Sweet Light (2012)

Singles from Songs in A&E
- 1. "Soul on Fire" Released: 19 May 2008

Professional ratings
Aggregate scores
Source	Rating
Metacritic	76/100
Review scores
Source	Rating
AllMusic	4/5 stars
The A.V. Club	A
Entertainment Weekly	B+
The Guardian	4/5 stars
The Independent	5/5 stars
Los Angeles Times	3/4 stars
NME	8/10
Pitchfork	8.4/10
Spin	4/5 stars
Uncut	4/5 stars

Songs in A&E is the sixth studio album by English rock band Spiritualized and is their first since 2003's Amazing Grace. It was released on 26 May 2008 in the UK on Sanctuary Records and on 27 May in the USA on Fontana Records. It was released on standard CD worldwide, as well as a limited edition book (with further artwork) and double 12" vinyl in the UK. The album's first single was "Soul on Fire," released on 19 May 2008 in the UK. Frontman Jason Pierce has said that the album is "the work of The Devil...with a little guidance from me."

The album leaked onto the internet on 29 March 2008. In December 2008, American webzine Somewhere Cold ranked Songs in A&E No. 6 on their 2008 Somewhere Cold Awards Hall of Fame.

== Background ==
Songs in A&E comes five years after Spiritualized's previous album – 2003's Amazing Grace – and following Pierce's near death experience in 2005, after he had contracted advanced periorbital cellulitis with bilateral pneumonia with rapid deterioration requiring intensive care and c-pap for type 1 respiratory failure. Indeed, the album takes its title from the long period Pierce spent in the Accident and Emergency ward (A&E) during this illness and it is also dedicated to the staff at the Royal London Hospital where he was treated.

However, most of the songs were written before Jason fell ill. The record was about a family that wasn't his, but when he revisited them Jason felt it predicted his near-death experience in some way. After his recovery, Jason was hesitant to finish the album, but a meeting with cult film director Harmony Korine inspired him to complete it. He also released a solo experimental record, Guitar Loops, and recorded the soundtrack to Korine's 2008 film Mister Lonely, with the Sun City Girls. The six Harmony tracks on the album are named after the director.

Jason wrote most of the songs on a 1929 Gibson L/00 (referred to as 'The Devil' in the liner notes) he bought in Cincinnati.

== Music ==
Musically the album marks a return to "the more expansive elements of [Pierce's] sound [...] even though it features the fewest noise-scapes and most terse songs in Spiritualized's history." The Observer Music Monthly has described the album's sound as "touching and harrowing [...and] belligerent."

New songs such as "Death Take Your Fiddle" and, especially, "Sitting on Fire" – which sounds as if Pierce recorded the vocal from his deathbed – are eerily prescient, while "Don't Hold Me Close," a tender duet with film-maker Harmony Korine's wife, Rachel, recalls Gram Parsons and Emmylou Harris [...] Throughout the album there are interludes of church chimes, otherworldly beeps and odd noises. In places it could be mistaken for an album of elevator music made for funeral homes and released on electronic label Warp. It is quite a trip.

The album features a number of guest vocalists, including backing vocals from The Dirtbombs on "Yeah Yeah" and a duet with film-maker Harmony Korine's wife, Rachel on "Don't Hold Me Close." The album also introduces a greater influence of string arrangements to Spiritualized's sound. Pierce credits the compositions of the album's orchestrations to his paucity of technical skill. "I don't write music. So I just sing what I want into a tape machine. That way I'm not limited by what I can't play."

The ending of the last track, "Goodnight Goodnight," features a brief lyrical and melodic nod to Daniel Johnston's "Funeral Home" (from his albums Continued Story and 1990), which itself is a nod to Bruce Springsteen. Pierce has stated this was a 'thank-you' to the singer, as Pierce's first live performance after his recovery was supporting Johnston at a tribute concert, in which he played a version of Funeral Home, as well as two other Johnston songs.

== Track listing ==
All songs written by J Spaceman.

1. "Harmony 1 (Mellotron)" – 0:24
2. "Sweet Talk" – 4:05
3. "Death Take Your Fiddle" – 3:14
4. "I Gotta Fire" – 2:28
5. "Soul on Fire" – 4:08
6. "Harmony 2 (Piano)" – 0:42
7. "Sitting on Fire" – 4:38
8. "Yeah Yeah" – 2:28
9. "You Lie You Cheat" – 3:04
10. "Harmony 3 (Voice)" – 0:18
11. "Baby I'm Just a Fool" – 7:07
12. "Don't Hold Me Close" – 3:08
13. "Harmony 4 (The Old Man...)" – 1:32
14. "The Waves Crash In" – 4:08
15. "Harmony 5 (Accordion)" – 1:03
16. "Borrowed Your Gun" – 3:48
17. "Harmony 6 (Glockenspiel)" – 0:50
18. "Goodnight Goodnight" – 4:38

== Singles ==
- "Soul on Fire" (19 May 2008)
  - CD: "Soul on Fire" (Single Edit) / "True Love Will Find You in the End" (Daniel Johnston cover) / "Harmony 2 (And Then a Miracle...)"
  - 7" red-coloured vinyl: "Soul on Fire" (Single Edit) / "True Love Will Find You in the End"
- "Sweet Talk" / "You Lie You Cheat" (11 August 2008); commercial release was canceled.
  - Promo CD-R: "Sweet Talk" (Single Edit) / "You Lie You Cheat"

== Personnel ==
Spiritualized:

- Spaceman – Fender Thinline, Fender Jaguar, Fender Jazzmaster, Fender Custom Vox Starstreamer, Gibson 125, Fender Bass VI, autoharp, harmonicas, melodica, accordion, piano, Gibson L/00 (The Devil), violin, percussion, Marshall Artist, HH Custom, Fender Superchamp, Farfisa Compact, Vox Continental, vocals
- Tony 'Doggen' Foster – Fender Jazzmaster, Gibson Les Paul Goldtop, Silvertone Acoustic, Rickenbacker Lap Steel, Fender Rhodes, Fender Twin, Marshall Artist, Hiwatt Custom 50
- Tom Edwards – vibraphone, marimbas, percussion, timpani, glockenspiel, Fender Rhodes, Hammond, reed organ, melodica, tubular bells
- Tim Lewis – Vox Continental, Farfisa Compact, synthesizers, piano
- Richard Warren – Rickenbacker 3000 Bass, Baldwin 704, Fender Precision Bass, Epiphone Casino, Vox Starstream 12, Burns Sonic Bass, Fender Bass VI
- Kevin Bales – Gretch Roundbadge, George Hayman Vibrasonic, Ludwig Jazz Festival Snare

Additional musicians:

- John Coxon – Fender Jaguar, pipe organ
- Barrie Cadogan – Gibson 330
- Alex Barrow – accordion
- Rachel Korine – vocals on "Don't Hold Me Close"
- Ben Edwards – trumpet
- David Temple – saxophones
- James Adams – trombone
- Nicky Sweeney – violins
- Ian Rathbone – violin
- Tony Woollard – cello
- Sara Temple – clarinet
- Johnny Morcombe – French horn
- Mary Owen – flute
- Sharlene Hector, Nomvula Malinga, Jasette Barrett – vocals
- The Dirtbombs (Mick Collins, Ko Melina, Troy Gregory) – vocals on "Yeah Yeah"
- The Choir (Sian Ahern, Rupert Clervaux, Matt Conner, Ben Crook, Dan Gamble, Simon Hill, Sarah McCrory, Kim Gehrig, Sarah Evans, Claire Luke, Poppy Spaceman, Hank Jackson) – vocals on "Borrowed Your Gun"
