= Kate Radley =

- Born: 19 February 1967 (age 59)
- Genres: Space rock, neo-psychedelia, experimental rock, symphonic rock, art rock, garage rock
- Occupation: Keyboardist
- Years active: 1992–1997; 2000–present (as Richard Ashcroft's studio session musician)
- Labels: Dedicated Records, Double Six, Hut, Parlophone, Righteous Phonographic Association

Kate Radley (born 19 February 1967) is an English keyboard player, best known for her work with the British rock band Spiritualized. She was a member during the time period which saw the release of the Lazer Guided Melodies, Pure Phase and Ladies and Gentlemen We Are Floating in Space albums, before leaving the band in 1997.

She has been married to musician Richard Ashcroft since 1995. She made a cameo appearance in the music video for "Bitter Sweet Symphony" by his band the Verve. The couple's first son was born in 2000. In 2004, their second son, Cassius, was born. Since her marriage, Radley has largely left the music industry, but still provides keyboard session work for several of Ashcroft's solo albums.
