= And Nothing Hurt =

Studio album by Spiritualized
- Released: 7 September 2018
- Studio: Konk; Snap; ROFL; Hackney Road; Holy Mountain; Fluff; Steve Mackey's; Flesh & Bone; Bella Union; Brushfield Street
- Genre: Space rock
- Length: 48:09
- Label: Fat Possum; Bella Union
- Producer: Jason Pierce

Spiritualized chronology
Sweet Heart Sweet Light (2012)	And Nothing Hurt (2018)	Everything Was Beautiful (2022)

Professional ratings
Aggregate scores
Source	Rating
AnyDecentMusic?	7.9/10
Metacritic	84/100
Review scores
Source	Rating
AllMusic	4/5 stars
The A.V. Club	A−
The Guardian	4/5 stars
The Independent	4/5 stars
Mojo	4/5 stars
NME	4/5 stars
Pitchfork	7.7/10
Q	4/5 stars
The Times	4/5 stars
Uncut	8/10

And Nothing Hurt is the eighth studio album by Spiritualized. The album was released on 7 September 2018 through Fat Possum Records in the United States and Bella Union in the United Kingdom, and is the band's first album in six years since 2012's Sweet Heart Sweet Light. The album was announced on 11 June 2018, along with the release of the album's first singles, "I'm Your Man" and "A Perfect Miracle". The album was produced by Jason Pierce.

Everything Was Beautiful, the band's ninth studio album released in 2022, is intended to be a companion piece to And Nothing Hurt and was created from the same demo sessions as that album. When both album titles are combined, they form the quote "Everything Was Beautiful, and Nothing Hurt", taken from the 1969 novel Slaughterhouse-Five by Kurt Vonnegut.

== Track listing ==
All tracks are written by Jason Pierce.

And Nothing Hurt track listing
No.	Title	Length
1.	"A Perfect Miracle"	4:46
2.	"I'm Your Man"	4:28
3.	"Here It Comes (The Road) Let's Go"	4:41
4.	"Let's Dance"	5:11
5.	"On the Sunshine"	5:00
6.	"Damaged"	4:57
7.	"The Morning After"	7:42
8.	"The Prize"	5:24
9.	"Sail on Through"	6:00
Total length:		48:09

== Personnel ==
Musicians

- Jason Pierce – Fender Thinline, Fender Jazzmaster, Gibson L-00, Fender Bass VI, Burns Sonic Bass, Gibson Firebird III, Farfisa, Vox Continental, Juno-60, Radioshack 100, harmonica, glockenspiel
- Tony Foster – Gibson Black Beauty, Fender Jazzmaster, harmonica, Rickenbacker lap steel, Epiphone Batwing
- James Stelfox – Fender Precision Bass, Fender Jazz Bass, Burns Sonic Bass, Fender Bass VI
- Tom Edwards – percussion, timpani, vibraphone, glockenspiel
- Lee Horsley – Hammond, piano, Vox Continental, Fender Rhodes, Farfisa Compact
- Dave Richmond – orchestral bass, Burns Bison Bass
- Scott Baylis – Roland Juno-106, Roland SH-01, Roland JU-06, Roli Seaboard
- Jonny Aitken – drums
- John Coxon – Gibson Firebird
- Alan Wilkinson – saxophones
- Kevin Brown – saxophones
- Kevin Cunningham – trumpet
- Stuart Haugh – trombone
- Jim Walker – violin
- Daniel Thomas – singing
- Lena Wright – singing
- Wendi Rose – singing
- Travis Cole – singing
- Alex Lamey – strings and horns
- Adam Langston – strings and horns

Technical personnel

- J. Spaceman – production, mixing, further production and mixing
- Darren Lawson – mixing
- Guy Massey – recording engineering
- Tom Leach – recording engineering, assistant engineering
- Misha Hering – recording engineering
- Aaron Cupples – recording engineering
- Iggy B – recording engineering
- David Stanley – recording engineering
- Shuta Shinoda – recording engineering
- Darren Lawson – recording engineering
- Oli Bayston – recording engineering
- Emre Ramazanoglu – recording engineering
- Armelle Pignon – assistant engineering
- Ben McCluskey – assistant engineering
- Josh Green – assistant engineering
- Max Prior – assistant engineering
- Tom Leach – assistant engineering
- Noel Summerville – mastering engineering
- Steve Mackey – further production and mixing

Artwork

- Juliette Larthe – photography
- Christina Dunlap – photography
- Travis Waddell – photography
- John Coxon – photography
- Rich Good – photography
- Farrow – design and art direction
- Spaceman – design and art direction

== Charts ==
Chart performance for And Nothing Hurt
Chart (2018)	Peak position
Austrian Albums (Ö3 Austria)	53
Belgian Albums (Ultratop Flanders)	76
Belgian Albums (Ultratop Wallonia)	97
German Albums (Offizielle Top 100)	60
Irish Albums (IRMA)	54
Scottish Albums (OCC)	8
Spanish Albums (PROMUSICAE)	24
Swiss Albums (Schweizer Hitparade)	92
UK Albums (OCC)	11
