= Passmore Sisters =

British indie band

The Passmore Sisters are a British Indie band who formed in Bradford, England in 1984. In 1986 the band relocated to Manchester with guitarist Peter Richardson leaving to be replaced by Brian E Roberts. Drummer Adrian Lee left in 1987 to be replaced by Robert Grace, joining Martin Sadofski (vocals) and Howard Taylor (bass) to complete the line up. They recorded three sessions for BBC Radio 1, two for John Peel (1985 and 1986) and one for Janice Long (1987).

== Discography ==
=== Singles ===
- Three Love Songs (7") (A) Dance The House Down (B) Goodbye To The Girl / Shatter. (CAL 3 Sharp Records 1985)
- Violent Blue (12") (A) Violent Blue / Pretty But Hollow (B) At Home With The Walls / Love Songs For Ever. (CAL 4 Sharp Records 1986)
- Every Child In Heaven (12") (A) Every Child In Heaven (Longer) (B) June In The Water / Difficult. (CAL6T Sharp Records 1987)
- Every Child In Heaven (7") (A) Every Child In Heaven (B) Grim English Joke. (CAL6 Sharp Records 1987)
- A Safe Place To Hide (12”) (A) A Safe Place To Hide (B) All I Need Is Change / Red Star Blue Heart (CAL7T Sharp Records 1987)
- A Safe Place To Hide (7”) (A) A Safe Place To Hide (B) All I Need Is Change (CAL7 Sharp Records 1987)
- Last Train To Clarksville (Vegetable Records 1941520267117 2019)
- These Things I Feel (Vegetable Records FEHUDL04 2020)

=== Albums ===
- First Love Last Rites - (Side 1) Difficult / Every Child In Heaven / Goodbye Billy Wild / Shatter / Sally Why / A Safe Place To Hide. (Side 2) Dance The House Down / June In The Water / Foundry Of Lies / Grim English Joke / Red Star Blue Heart / All I Need Is Change (CAL P1 Sharp Records 1988)
- The Original Rock’n’Roll Chair - Every Child In Heaven / June In The Water / Difficult / A Safe Place To Hide / All I Need Is Change / Dance The House Down / Goodbye To The Girl / The Grim English Joke / Red Star, Blue Heart / Pretty But Hollow / Shatter / At Home With The Walls / Beautiful Now / Admission / Love Songs Forever / Strong For Europe / Violent Blue / After Imitation / Every Child In Heaven (Longer) (Vegetable Records FEHUCD005 2018)
