= Let It Come Down (Spiritualized album) =

Studio album by Spiritualized
- Released: 17 September 2001
- Recorded: 1999–2001
- Studios: Abbey Road Studios, London; AIR Studios, London
- Genres: Art rock; symphonic rock; space rock; gospel
- Length: 63:01
- Label: Arista
- Producer: Jason Pierce

Spiritualized chronology
Royal Albert Hall October 10 1997 (1998)	Let It Come Down (2001)	The Complete Works (2003)

Singles from Let It Come Down
- 1. "Stop Your Crying" Released: 10 September 2001; 2. "Out of Sight" Released: 26 November 2001; 3. "Do It All Over Again" Released: 11 February 2002

Let It Come Down is the fourth studio album by the rock band Spiritualized, released in 2001. It was recorded and produced at Abbey Road and AIR Studios. It took Jason Pierce, Spiritualized's lead singer, guitarist and sole constant member, four years to write, perform, produce and release. The album utilises 115 session musicians, including orchestra and London Community Gospel Choir. The wall of sound technique (most notably used by 1960s record producer Phil Spector) is evident on this album, especially on such tracks as "Do It All Over Again", "Stop Your Crying", "The Straight and the Narrow" and "Out of Sight".

== Music ==
The album's sound is described as art rock, symphonic rock, space rock, and gospel.

== Album cover ==
The album was released in two different sleeves – one in a standard jewel case, the other in a much bulkier one-piece box, with the cover image (the wife of the artist) debossed in the case material.

== Track listing ==
All songs written by J Spaceman.

No.	Title	Length
1.	"On Fire"	4:02
2.	"Do It All Over Again"	3:48
3.	"Don't Just Do Something"	6:54
4.	"Out of Sight"	6:12
5.	"The Twelve Steps"	4:43
6.	"The Straight and the Narrow"	5:12
7.	"I Didn't Mean to Hurt You"	5:14
8.	"Stop Your Crying"	5:16
9.	"Anything More"	5:36
10.	"Won't Get to Heaven (The State I'm In)"	10:34
11.	"Lord Can You Hear Me"	5:38
Total length:		63:01

== Reception ==
Professional ratings
Aggregate scores
Source	Rating
Metacritic	74/100
Review scores
Source	Rating
AllMusic	4/5 stars
Blender	4/5 stars
Entertainment Weekly	A−
The Guardian	5/5 stars
Los Angeles Times	2/4 stars
NME	9/10
Pitchfork	8.4/10
Q	4/5 stars
Rolling Stone	3.5/5 stars
Spin	4/10

Q listed Let It Come Down as one of the best 50 albums of 2001. Paste ranked the album number 18 on its list of best albums of 2001.

The Independent ranked the album number 11 on its list of 20 most underrated albums ever.

== Commercial performance ==
Let It Come Down is the band's most successful album on the UK Albums Chart, where it peaked at number three. As of 2005 it has sold 55,000 copies in the United States, and as of 2003 it has shipped 250,000 units across Europe.

== Charts ==
Chart (2001)	Peak position
Swedish Albums (Sverigetopplistan)	47
Norwegian Albums (VG-lista)	5
French Albums (SNEP)	108

== Personnel ==
Spiritualized

- Spaceman – Fender Thinline, Fender Jaguar, Epiphone Olympic, Vox Starstreamer XII, Martin acoustic, banjo, Vox Continental, Farfisa Compact, piano, harmonica, vocals
- Thighpaulsandra – Hammond C3, Vox Continental, Farfisa Compact, VK7, Kurzweil K2000, Minimoog, Fender Rhodes, piano
- Doggen Foster – Gibson Les Paul Gold Top, Gibson Les Paul Custom, Fender Telecaster, Vox Bulldog, Martin acoustic, harmonica
- John Coxon – Fender Telecaster, Fender Jaguar, Gibson Firebird, Vox Continental, Farfisa Compact, piano, Juno 106, Martin acoustic
- Martin Schellard – Fender Jazz Bass, Fender Musicmaster, Fender Bass VI, Burns Bass, Fender Telecaster, banjo, piano
- Tom Edwards – vibraphone, marimba, timpani, tubular bells, percussion
- Kevin Bales – Gretsch drum kit
- Raymond Dickaty – soprano and baritone saxophone

Additional musicians

- Pete Whyman – saxophones, clarinet
- Mimi Parker – vocals
- Chris Clark – piano
- David O'Carroll – tuba
- Ben Edwards – trumpet
- Nick Smart – trumpet
- James Adams – trombone
- Tamar Osborn – saxophone, clarinet
- David Temple – saxophone, clarinet
- First Violins: Edmund Coxon (leader), Cathy Thompson, Jackie Shave, Everton Nelson, Patrick Kiernan, Steve Morris, Ian Humphries, Christina Emanuel, Laura Malhuish
- Second Violins: Jonathan Rees, Dai Emanuel, Sonia Slany, Perry Montague-Mason, Miffy Hirsch, Jeremy Morris, Ann Morfee
- Viola: Roger Chase, Philip Dukes, Bruce White, Kate Musker
- Cello: David Daniels, Tony Pleeth, Cathy Giles, Jonathan Tunnell
- Double Bass: Mary Scully, Diane Clarke
- Cor Anglais: Jane Marshall
- Bassoon: Gavin McNaughton, Celia Birkenshaw
- French Horn: Hugh Seenan, Richard Bissel, Nigel Black, Paul Gardham, Dave Lee, Martin Owen, Richard Ashton, Michaela Betts
- Trumpet: Andy Crowley, Ian Balmain, Bob Farley, Paul Archibald, Paul Beniston
- Trombone: Graham Lee, Colin Sheen, Peter Davies, Mike Hext, Roger Brenner
- Bass Trombone: David Stewart, Roger Argente, Andy Waddicor
- Flute/Alto flute and Bass flute: Dave Health, Andy Findon
- Contra-bass flute: Andy Findon
- Oboe: Chris Cowie, Margaret Tindal
- Clarinet: Anthony Pike, Richard Addison
- Bass Clarinet: David Fuest
- Harp: Helen Tunstall

Additional vocals

- Nigel Short – counter tenor
- Emer McParland – alto
- Sarah Eyden – soprano
- Simon Grant – bass
- Andrew Busher – tenor
- Michael Dore – bass
- Heather Cairncross – alto
- Andrew Gray – tenor
- Jacqueline Barron – soprano
- Rachel Weston – alto
- Gerard O'Beirne – tenor
- London Community Gospel Choir: Wendi Rose, Wayne Hernandez, Jenny Graham, Donovan Keith Lawrence, Vernetta Meade, Jenny La Touche, Aaron Paul Sokell, Travis Jae Cole, Vimbai Shire, Samantha Smith, Irene Forrester, Carmen Smart, Michelle John-Douglas, Jasette Barratt
- Choir Director: Daniel Thomas
