= Fucked Up Inside =

1993 live album by Spiritualized

Live album by Spiritualized
- Released: 17 June 1993
- Recorded: November 1992
- Studio: Hollywood Palladium, Los Angeles
- Genre: Space rock
- Length: 47:08
- Label: Dedicated Records
- Producer: J. Spaceman

Spiritualized chronology
Lazer Guided Melodies (1992)	Fucked Up Inside (1993)	Pure Phase (1995)

Professional ratings
Review scores
Source	Rating
AllMusic	link

Fucked Up Inside is a 1993 live album by the British space rock band Spiritualized. It was originally available only via mail order, and the name comes from the song "Medication". Image by British Photographer Andrew Penketh

== Track listing ==
1. "Take Good Care of It" - 4:49
2. "I Want You" - 3:18
3. "Medication" - 7:34
4. "Angel Sigh" - 5:10
5. "Walking With Jesus" - 5:03
6. "Shine a Light (Clear Light/Clear Rush)" - 14:39
7. "Smiles" - 6:35
