= Pure Phase =

Studio album by Spiritualized
- Released: 28 March 1995
- Recorded: 1993–1994
- Studios: Moles Studio, Bath
- Genres: Space rock; noise pop; drone; shoegaze
- Length: 68:11
- Label: Dedicated
- Producer: Jason Pierce

Spiritualized chronology
Fucked Up Inside (1993)	Pure Phase (1995)	Ladies and Gentlemen We Are Floating in Space (1997)

Pure Phase is the second studio album by Spiritualized, released on 28 March 1995. The album was recorded in the Moles Studio in Bath, and features contributions from The Balanescu Quartet. Initial CD copies were sold in a glow-in-the-dark, encapsulated CD case.

The lineup fluctuated during recording, with the band eventually reduced to a core trio of Jason Pierce, Kate Radley and Sean Cook. Previous members Mark Refoy and Jonny Mattock performed the main guitar and drums sections respectively, but by the time of album release, both men had been sacked from the band. At the time of release, Pierce had renamed the band as "Spiritualized Electric Mainline", the name that appears on the album cover, before reverting to the Spiritualized name shortly afterwards.

The track "Pure Phase" was the basis for a limited edition release called "Pure Phase Tones For DJs", which consisted of 16 versions of "Pure Phase", four on each side of the single, playable at both 33 and 45 rpm. The tracks were in the keys of C/F; D/G; E/A; F/B-flat; G/C; A/D; B/E; and C/F, at varying frequencies. Pierce intended that they were to be used as a set, in order to make chords. The 'Pure Phase Tone' still features heavily in Spiritualized's live set to this day, playing in between songs and before they go onstage, acting as their entrance music.

== Music ==
The album's sound is described as space rock, noise pop, drone, and "shoegaze full of meditative noise."

== Influence ==
The Quietus noted the album had more electronic music influences than the band's other records.

Electronic influences were coming into play too – Pure Phase is the most electronic of the 1990s Spiritualized records – and Pierce was engaged in bridging a gap between dance music and indie rock in a more interesting way than the humble indie dance remix. A Hackney Empire show around the recording of Pure Phase saw Aphex Twin and Mixmaster Morris supporting with a long ambient set – incense was burned, candles flooded the stage.

== Recording ==
Upon the reissue, Jason Pierce described the unique recording process.

You can’t really compare this record to any other because of how we mixed it; in such an 'incorrect' way. We mixed the tracks twice but I couldn’t decide which one I liked better so we said, 'let’s have them both.' Both of them were on tape so we spent hours cutting them into usable sections. If you run two things together in parallel you get this kind of Hawkwind effect (phase), which gets deeper as they drift away from being ‘locked’, so we had to keep re-locking on a bass drum every eight or ten bars and it took forever.

== Critical reception ==
Professional ratings
Review scores
Source	Rating
AllMusic	3.5/5 stars
Chicago Tribune	3/4 stars
Entertainment Weekly	B−
The Guardian	3/4 stars
Mojo	4/5 stars
Q	3/5 stars
Record Collector	4/5 stars
Rolling Stone	4/5 stars
The Rolling Stone Album Guide	3/5 stars
Select	4/5

In 2014, NME included the album in its list of "30 Glorious Britpop Albums That Deserve a Reissue Pronto." In 2015, NME also listed it among 30 Albums That Made 1995 a Vintage Year for Music. Louder Than War described it as "probably the most groundbreaking drone album made in size and scope" and "a forgotten masterpiece reawakened." Dash the Henge said, "Pure Phase feels somewhat overlooked as the groundbreaking record it truly is" and, "as much as any Spiritualized release, Pure Phase feels like it has entire galaxies within." On the album's 30th anniversary, Chase Harrison for I Have That On Vinyl wrote, "There’s an unhurried prettiness and tranquility to Spiritualized that few, if any, guitar-based bands of the era approached. But there are also the expected scuzzy psych/free jazz freakouts, crescendos, horns, woodwinds, and strings of The Balanescu Quartet predicting what was to come on Ladies and Gentlemen and Let it Come Down."

== Track listing ==
All songs by J. Pierce except "Born, Never Asked" by Laurie Anderson

No.	Title	Length
1.	"Medication"	8:16
2.	"The Slide Song"	3:52
3.	"Electric Phase"	1:34
4.	"All of My Tears"	3:10
5.	"These Blues"	3:05
6.	"Let It Flow"	5:30
7.	"Take Good Care of It"	4:37
8.	"Born, Never Asked"	2:05
9.	"Electric Mainline"	7:40
10.	"Lay Back in the Sun"	5:09
11.	"Good Times"	4:54
12.	"Pure Phase"	6:19
13.	"Spread Your Wings"	6:31
14.	"Feel Like Goin' Home"	5:35
Total length:		68:11

== Personnel ==
Credits adapted from liner notes.

Spiritualized

- Jason Pierce – guitar (Gibson Firebird, Fender Thinline), dulcimer, vocals
- Kate Radley – keyboards (Vox Continental, Farfisa, piano), vocals
- Mark Refoy – guitar
- Sean Cook – bass (Fender Precision Bass), harmonica (listed as "wha-monica")
- Jonny Mattock – drums, percussion

Additional musicians

- Simon Clarke – saxophone, flute
- Michael Bami Rose – saxophone, flute
- Tim Sanders – saxophone
- Roddy Lorimer – trumpet
- Steve Sidwell – trumpet
- Tam Tam – trumpet
- Rico Rodriguez – trumpet
- Leon Hunt – banjo
- Stuart Gordon – violin
- The Balanescu Quartet – violins, viola, cello
- Claire Connors – string arrangements for the Balanescu Quartet
- Chris Sharrock – drums ("Lay Back in the Sun")
- Caroline Crawley – vocals ("The Slide Song")
- Helen White – vocals ("Let It Flow")
- Marilyn McFarlane – vocals ("Let It Flow")

Technical personnel

- Jason Pierce – production, mixing, sleeve design
- Barry Clempson – engineering
- Andy Wilkinson – engineering
- Julian Withers – engineering
- Mike Long – engineering
- Mads Bjerke – engineering, mixing, post-production
- Richard Baker – assistant engineer
- Scott Powell – assistant engineer
- John Coxon – mixing, post-production
- Chris Blair – mastering
- Merton Gauster – photographer (cover)
- Michael Lavine – photographer (band)
- Carol Kemp – logo
