= Everything Was Beautiful =

Studio album by Spiritualized
- Released: 22 April 2022
- Genres: Space rock; psychedelic rock
- Length: 44:01
- Label: Fat Possum

Spiritualized chronology
And Nothing Hurt (2018)	Everything Was Beautiful (2022)

Singles from Everything Was Beautiful
- 1. "Always Together with You" Released: 2 November 2021; 2. "Crazy" Released: 10 January 2022; 3. "The Mainline Song" Released: 7 March 2022

Everything Was Beautiful is the ninth studio album by Spiritualized, released under Fat Possum Records on April 22, 2022. The album contains influences from psychedelic music, gospel music, and classic rock.

== Recording and release ==
The content of Everything Was Beautiful was taken from the same demo sessions as and serves as a companion piece to the band's previous album, And Nothing Hurt. Put together, both album titles form the quote "Everything Was Beautiful and Nothing Hurt", taken from the 1969 novel Slaughterhouse-Five by Kurt Vonnegut. The album's lead vocalist, Jason Pierce, played 16 different instruments during the album.

The album's first single and music video, "Always Together with You", was released on 2 November 2021; the album's second single and music video, "Crazy", was released on 10 January 2022; the album's third and final single and music video, "The Mainline Song", was released on 7 March 2022.

== Reception ==
Professional ratings
Aggregate scores
Source	Rating
AnyDecentMusic?	8.2/10
Metacritic	83/100
Review scores
Source	Rating
AllMusic	4.5/5 stars
The Arts Desk	4/5 stars
Beats per Minute	78%
Clash	9/10
Evening Standard	5/5 stars
The Line of Best Fit	9/10
NME	4/5 stars
Paste	8.5/10
Pitchfork	7.8/10
Under the Radar	9/10

On the review aggregate site Metacritic, Everything Was Beautiful earned a rating of 83 out of 100, based on 23 reviews, indicating "universal acclaim". Aggregator AnyDecentMusic? gave it 8.2 out of 10, based on their assessment of the critical consensus and ranked it the 18th best album of 2022. The album received 4/5 stars from the Observer and 4/5 from the NME. Ben Cardew of Pitchfork gave the album a 7.8/10 and described the album "like meeting an old friend and finding new shared memories." Caleb Campbell writing for Under the Radar gave the album a 9/10 while claiming that there is "immensely evident craftsmanship that runs through the album". AllMusic reviewer Fred Thomas described the album as a "delirious and exciting, a perfect distilment of the best parts of the band's various phases that feels reinvigorated and new" and gave the album a 4.5/5. Writing for The Line of Best Fit, John Amen gave the album 9/10 and concluded, "Everything Was Beautiful shows Spiritualized accessing yet another artistic plateau, forging an exemplary hybridization of unshakeable songs and sublimely assembled music." In Relix, Justin Jacobs notes that Spaceman relies on "many of his old tricks, but the music still comes out sounding fresh and colorful" and writes that "his heady sound feels more vital than ever".

== Track listing ==
All tracks are written by J. Spaceman.

Everything Was Beautiful track listing
No.	Title	Length
1.	"Always Together with You"	6:39
2.	"Best Thing You Never Had (The D Song)"	5:52
3.	"Let It Bleed (For Iggy)"	4:41
4.	"Crazy"	3:52
5.	"The Mainline Song"	5:56
6.	"The A Song (Laid in Your Arms)"	7:07
7.	"I'm Coming Home Again"	9:54
Total length:		44:01

== Charts ==
Chart performance for Everything Was Beautiful
Chart (2022)	Peak position
Belgian Albums (Ultratop Flanders)	153
Belgian Albums (Ultratop Wallonia)	77
German Albums (Offizielle Top 100)	50
Scottish Albums (Official Charts)	3
Spanish Albums (Promusicae)	71
Swiss Albums (Schweizer Hitparade)	20
UK Albums (Official Charts)	5
US Independent Albums (Billboard)	39

== Personnel ==
Per the album liner notes:

Musicians

- J Spaceman – Fender Thinline guitar, Fender Jazzmaster guitar, Gibson L-00 acoustic guitar, Fender Bass VI, Burns Sonic bass, Gibson Firebird III guitar, Farfisa Compact organ, Vox Continental guitar, Roland Juno-60 keyboard, Moog, Radio Shack 100, harmonica and bass harmonica, glockenspiel, melodica, piano
- Tony Foster – Gibson Black Beauty guitar, Fender Jazzmaster guitar, harmonica, Rickenbacker lap steel, Epiphone Batwing guitar
- James Stelfox – Fender Precision bass, Fender Jazz bass, Fender Bass VI, Burns Sonic bass, Epiphone violin bass
- John Coxon – Gibson Firebird guitar, Vicente Sanchis Spanish guitar, Fender Telecaster guitar
- Tom Edwards – percussion, timpani, vibraphone, glockenspiel, marimba, orchestral bass drum
- Lee Horsley – Hammond organ, piano, Vox Continental guitar, Fender Rhodes electric piano, Farfisa Compact organ
- Kevin Bales – Gretsch Round Badge drums and percussion
- Kid Millions (John Colpitts) – drums on original recording of "Best Thing You Never Had (The D Song)"
- Brad Truax – bass on original recording of "Best Thing You Never Had (The D Song)"
- Alan Wilkinson – tenor and baritone saxophones
- Alex Ward – clarinet, alto saxophone
- Kevin Brown – soprano and alto saxophones
- Kevin Cunningham – trumpet
- Stuart Haugh – trombone
- Jim Walker – violin
- Diamond White – violin
- James Cocker – viola
- Arnold Parks – cello
- Melvyn Duffy - pedal steel
- Jason Hart – pedal steel
- David Wrench – Moog One 16 Voice analog synthesizer
- Nikki Lane – vocals on "Crazy"
- Dex Chilcott – backing vocals on "Crazy"
- Daniel Thomas, Lena Wright, Wendi Rose, Travis Cole – singers
- Alex Lamay, Adam Langston – strings and horns
- Iris Mathieson – ukulele
- Poppy Spaceman – vocals on "Always Together With You"

Production

- Guy Massey, Tom Leach, Misha Hering, Aaron Cupples, Iggy B, David Stanley, Shuta Shinoda, Darren Lawson, Oliver Bayston, Jason Buckle, Emre Ramazanoglu, David Wrench, Dan Cox, Cenzo Townshend, Drew Smith – recording engineers
- Armelle Pignon, Ben McCluskey, Josh Green, Tom Leach, Max Prior, Robert Sellens – assistant engineers
- David Wrench and J Spaceman – mixing
- Matt Colton – mastering
- Dan Cox and J Spaceman – additional production and editing
- Farrow Design/J Spaceman – design and art direction
