= Lazer Guided Melodies =

Studio album by Spiritualized
- Released: 30 March 1992
- Recorded: November 1990 – July 1991
- Studio: VHF Sound Centre, Rugby; Moles Studio, Bath; Far Heath Studio, Northamptonshire
- Genre: Dream pop; space rock; shoegaze
- Length: 61:17
- Label: Dedicated
- Producer: Jason Pierce, Barry Clempson

Spiritualized chronology
| Lazer Guided Melodies (1992) | Fucked Up Inside (1993) |

Lazer Guided Melodies is the debut studio album by English space rock band Spiritualized. The album was recorded by the inaugural line up of the band, consisting of Jason Pierce (vocals, guitars), Mark Refoy (guitars), Will Carruthers (bass), Jonny Mattock (drums) and Kate Radley (keyboards) from 1990 to 1991, and mixed by Pierce in London in January 1992. The album was first released on Dedicated Records in March 1992, on cassette, Compact Disc and Vinyl (2 x LP, with initial copies containing an additional free 7").

Initially released on two 45 rpm vinyl LPs, the album's twelve songs are segued together into four colour-coded (red, green, blue, black), cross-faded suites. As such, the album was included in Pitchfork's 2010 list of "ten unusual CD-era gimmicks".

By 1995, the album had sold 10,000 copies in the United States.

== Background ==
Lazer Guided Melodies is unique in Jason Pierce's oeuvre as it simultaneously explores motorik, minimalist music, and space rock while subtly using "meticulously detailed, layered instrumentation, the sumptuous deployment of horns and strings" to create cinematic, textured, and deeply narcotic soundscapes. Pierce reported that the album cost £3800 to produce.

Critic Simon Reynolds wrote in his Melody Maker review of the album:

Spiritualized's music quivers with Apollonian attributes – airiness, fleetness, radiance, serenity ... At times, Spiritualized recall the Kraut version of freeway rock known as motorik, in particular Neu ..."Run" is all about the exhilaration of cutting loose, of goalless propulsion ... "If I Were with Her Now" is throbbing motorik too ... swathed by scintillating guitar chimes like the world whooshing by ... Along with motion, Spiritualized's other consummate metaphor for release is ascension. "Step into the Breeze" makes me think of a Wiltshire water meadow or somesuch pastoral bower of bliss ... "Symphony Space" [is] an amorphous flux of orchestral resonances that hover and ache, swim and brim, for a small eternity. The sound of heaven ... At times, Spiritualized are making 21st century gospel.

== Music ==
The album is described musically as dream pop, space rock, and shoegaze.

== Critical reception and legacy ==
Professional ratings
Review scores
| Source | Rating |
|---|---|
| AllMusic | 4.5/5 stars |
| Los Angeles Times | 3/4 stars |
| Mojo | 4/5 stars |
| NME | 9.999̅/10 |
| Pitchfork | 9.0/10 |
| Q | 4/5 stars |
| Record Collector | 4/5 stars |
| The Rolling Stone Album Guide | 3.5/5 stars |
| Select | 4/5 |
| Uncut | 9/10 |

Lazer Guided Melodies was included in the book 1001 Albums You Must Hear Before You Die. In 2016, Vinyl Me, Please listed the album as one of the "10 Best Shoegaze Albums to Own on Vinyl". In 2017, NME ranked the album at number 2 on its list of the "10 Best Shoegaze Albums Ever". In 2018, Pitchfork ranked the album at number 11 on its list of "The 30 Best Dream Pop Albums." The Quietus said that the album's "cosmic prettiness" anticipated dream pop. While reviewing its 2021 reissue, Pitchfork described it as "one of the most gentle rock records of its time" and stated that "Spiritualized seemed to emerge from the ether perfectly realized, creating rock music that was serene, spaced-out, and untroubled." Music critic Jim DeRogatis called Lazer Guided Melodies “one of the most enchanting psychedelic rock albums ever made.”

== Track listing ==
All tracks are written by Jason Pierce, except where noted.

Lazer Guided Melodies track listing
| No. | Title | Writer(s) | Length |
|---|---|---|---|
| 1. | "You Know It's True" | | 3:39 |
| 2. | "If I Were with Her Now" | | 5:44 |
| 3. | "I Want You" | | 3:47 |
| 4. | "Run" | Pierce; J. J. Cale | 3:51 |
| 5. | "Smiles" | | 2:14 |
| 6. | "Step into the Breeze" | | 2:43 |
| 7. | "Symphony Space" | | 5:54 |
| 8. | "Take Your Time" | | 6:52 |
| 9. | "Shine a Light" | | 7:15 |
| 10. | "Angel Sigh" | | 5:46 |
| 11. | "Sway" | Pierce; Mark Refoy | 6:53 |
| 12. | "200 Bars" | | 6:15 |
| Total length: | | | 61:17 |

On the LP edition, tracks 1–3 are the "Red" section, tracks 4–7 are the "Green" section, tracks 8–9 are the "Blue" section, and tracks 10–12 are the "Black" section. Track 4, "Run", contains elements of "Call Me the Breeze" by J. J. Cale and "Run Run Run" by The Velvet Underground.

== Personnel ==
Credits adapted from liner notes.

Spiritualized

- Jason Pierce – guitar (Fender Telecaster, Eko Rocket, acoustic guitar), dulcimer, autoharp, piano, vocals
- Kate Radley – keyboards (Vox Continental, Farfisa, piano), vocals
- Mark Refoy – guitar (Gretsch Country Gent, Epiphone Casino, Fender Telecaster), acoustic guitar, dulcimer
- Will Carruthers – bass (Gibson Thunderbird)
- Jonny Mattock – drums, percussion, dulcimer

Additional musicians

- Simon Clarke – flute
- Roddy Lorimer – trumpet
- Will Gregory – saxophone
- Colin Humphries – cello
- Martin Robinson – cello
- Owen John – violin

Technical personnel

- Jason Pierce – production, mixing
- Barry Clempson – mixing, engineering, production
- Angus Wallace – engineering
- Declan O'Regan – engineering
- Mike Long – engineering
- Paul Adkins – engineering
- Chris Blair – mastering
- Gavin Lindsay – artwork
- Pete Gardner – photographer
- Andrew Sutton – sleeve design
- Albert Tupelo – sleeve design

== Charts ==
1992 chart performance for Lazer Guided Melodies
| Chart (1992) | Peak position |
|---|---|
| UK Albums (OCC) | 27 |

2021 chart performance for Lazer Guided Melodies
| Chart (2021) | Peak position |
|---|---|
| Scottish Albums (OCC) | 7 |
| Swedish Physical Albums (Sverigetopplistan) | 18 |
| UK Independent Albums (OCC) | 5 |
