= Bedazzled (band) =

British indie pop group

Bedazzled were a British indie pop group active in the early 1990s. Originating from Gloucestershire, and formed by members of Apple Mosaic (led by Ian Dench, later of EMF), the band were signed to Columbia Records and comparable to other organ-led indie dance/pop acts of the era such as Airhead and The Dylans. After several singles (including "Summer Song" and "Teenage Mother Superior") and the 1992 album Sugarfree, they disbanded.
