= Ladies and Gentlemen We Are Floating in Space =

Studio album by Spiritualized
- Released: 16 June 1997
- Recorded: 1995–1997
- Studios: Moles (Bath); The Church / Rooster / The Strongroom (London); House of Blues (Memphis); The Hit Factory (New York); A&M (Los Angeles)
- Genres: Space rock; neo-psychedelia; shoegaze; gospel
- Length: 70:03; 69:41 (abridged version)
- Label: Dedicated
- Producers: Jason Pierce; John Coxon

Spiritualized chronology
Pure Phase (1995)	Ladies and Gentlemen We Are Floating in Space (1997)	Royal Albert Hall October 10, 1997 (1998)

Alternative album cover
- Cover used on some 2020s reissues and streaming platforms

Singles from Ladies and Gentlemen We Are Floating in Space
- 1. "Electricity" Released: 28 July 1997; 2. "I Think I'm in Love" Released: 2 February 1998; 3. "Come Together" Released: 17 July 1998

Ladies and Gentlemen We Are Floating in Space (stylised in sentence case) is the third studio album by English space rock band Spiritualized, released on 16 June 1997. The album features guest appearances from the Balanescu Quartet, the London Community Gospel Choir and Dr. John.

== Background ==
The album's title is from the philosophical novel Sophie's World by Jostein Gaarder, the context being:

Only philosophers embark on this perilous expedition to the outermost reaches of language and existence. Some of them fall off, but others cling on desperately and yell at the people nestling deep in the snug softness, stuffing themselves with delicious food and drink. "Ladies and Gentlemen," they yell, "we are floating in space!" But none of the people down there care.

The album itself was recorded shortly after the break-up of Spiritualized's Jason Pierce and Kate Radley, the band's keyboard player. Radley had secretly married Richard Ashcroft of The Verve in 1995. Pierce, however, maintains that much of the album, including "Broken Heart" and "Cool Waves", had been written before the breakup. "If you write a song like ['Broken Heart'], you have to make it feel like what it's like to have a broken heart," he said. "That's what making albums is all about. Otherwise it's just field recordings."

The title track features lines sung by Pierce through a high-pass filter imitating the spacecraft communications of the Apollo program, including the Quindar tones in between lines. Original pressings had a version of the song that incorporated the lyrics and melody of Elvis Presley's "Can't Help Falling in Love." The Presley estate initially objected to this, and a remixed version appeared on the commercial release, with new lyrics. However, Spiritualized continue to use both sets of lyrics in live performances. The 2009 reissue restored the version with the Presley lyrics, with the proviso that Presley's song would be included in the title with parentheses. Further reissues have since reverted the retitling.

Album closer "Cop Shoot Cop..." references lyrics from John Prine's "Sam Stone", incorporating variations on a key line from that song's chorus.

== Recording ==
In the summer of 1995, Jason Pierce and Sean Cook entered Moles Studio in Bath, England, to start work on demo recordings with resident engineer Trevor Curwen. Pierce would develop his ideas into complete songs during this period. A few weeks later, recording of the album proper began in earnest, with all of the band members present. Working on 24-track tape synchronised to an Atari sequencer allowed Pierce to build up sequenced tracks from samples of live playing, coupled with some parts gleaned from the demo sessions. The full band line-up, including John Coxon on guitar, performed live over this sequenced backbone.

With the basic framework intact, Pierce moved the project to London to work with engineer Darren Allison on the recording of vocals, guitars, keyboards, gospel choir and brass section at The Church Studios. The pair worked on further vocal recording at Rooster Studios, before moving on to recording strings with the Balanescu Quartet at London's Olympic Studios. At this point, Pierce made a trip to the United States to record Dr. John's piano and vocal parts on the track "Cop Shoot Cop".

The mixing process involved various studios and personnel. Beginning at House of Blues in Memphis, Pierce returned to work again with Allison at The Strongroom Studios, John Leckie, and Curwen at Moles Studio. With the mixing phase complete, Pierce concentrated on post-production and editing with Mads Bjerke, and Ray Staff at Whitfield Street Studios took charge of the mastering process.

== Music ==
The album's sound has been described by music critics and journalists, both in terms of the scenes Spiritualized pertained to and their influences at the time, as space rock, neo-psychedelia, shoegaze, gospel, and blues.

== Releases ==
The artwork was designed by Pierce in collaboration with Mark Farrow. A special edition of the album was packaged in a box designed to resemble prescription medicine, complete with a booklet containing "dosage advice" and a foil blister pack containing the CD. A limited edition was also released, featuring each of the 12 songs in its own individually wrapped 3-inch CD, inside a large blister pack and box.

In 2020, record club Vinyl Me, Please announced they would reissue the album on blue colored vinyl in September of the same year. This was the first "artist-approved" vinyl reissue of the album.

== Critical reception ==
Professional ratings
Review scores
Source	Rating
AllMusic	4.5/5 stars
Entertainment Weekly	B+
The Guardian	5/5 stars
Los Angeles Times	3.5/4 stars
Mojo	5/5 stars
NME	9 1/8/10
Pitchfork	7.6/10 (1997); 10/10 (2010)
Rolling Stone	3.5/5 stars
The Rolling Stone Album Guide	4.5/5 stars
Select	4/5

Ladies and Gentlemen We Are Floating in Space was released to widespread acclaim from music critics. Melody Maker reviewer Ian Watson called it "one mind-blowing perspective-fusing supernova of an album" and "the only truly modern blues record of the decade, a record that redefines notions of bittersweet and love–hate to the point where everyday emotions seem very small indeed." Paul Moody of NME hailed the album as "a seismic tour de force" and found that Pierce had managed to draw upon "an army" of musical influences and "create an entirely new noise out of the wreckage." Roy Wilkinson, writing for Select, highlighted its more elaborate instrumentation and production compared to Spiritualized's earlier work, calling the album "a remarkable testimony to Pierce's vision." Dan Glaister commented in The Guardian that "Pierce delivers a work that comes close to capturing the spirit ... the scale, the beauty and impact" of the Beatles' Sgt. Pepper's Lonely Hearts Club Band (1967).

Los Angeles Times critic Steve Hochman wrote that "Floating essentially recycles, refines and expands on the key elements" of previous Spiritualized albums, but "the mix has evolved to a higher plane on which Pierce has constructed a symphonic arc that plays out almost continuously over 70-plus minutes of ebb and flow through structured songs, ambient drift and static, noisy release." In Rolling Stone, Neva Chonin described the album as musically "a study in graceful synthesis", while also lauding the "human core" of its lyrics: "Both ethereal and earthy, Ladies and Gentlemen We Are Floating in Space doesn't try to hide its uglier aspects – which, in the end, is what makes it so damn gorgeous." Although finding it "monotonous" at times, Rob Brunner of Entertainment Weekly concluded that "Memphis-soul horns, blues harmonica, and gospel singing keep the songs from drifting away altogether." The Village Voice's Robert Christgau considered the album "refreshingly short on the fatalism pawned off as wisdom by the Verve and depressive if impressive Radiohead", later awarding it a "one-star honorable mention".

Ladies and Gentlemen We Are Floating in Space reached number four on the UK charts, during the height of the Britpop period. The album went on to be named the NME album of the year at the end of 1997, beating other critically acclaimed albums such as Radiohead's OK Computer and the Verve's Urban Hymns. Select and Vox named Ladies and Gentlemen the second best album of the year, while Melody Maker and The Face named it the fifth best. The album ranked at number 13 on Uncut's year-end list, and Q named it as one of the year's 50 best albums. Ladies and Gentlemen We Are Floating in Space also ranked at number 17 on The Village Voice's year-end Pazz & Jop critics' poll.

== Legacy ==
Ladies and Gentlemen We Are Floating in Space has since been acclaimed as one of the best albums of the 1990s on various publications' decade-end lists. In 2009, Pitchfork ranked it at number 55 on their list of the top 100 albums of the 1990s. In their 2022 update, Pitchfork ranked it number 86 on their list of top 150 albums of the 1990s. In 2010, the album was also named one of the 125 Best Albums of the Past 25 Years by Spin. As of March 2010, the album has sold over 111,000 copies in United States.

A majority of the songs on the album were recorded live for the band's following release Royal Albert Hall October 10, 1997. Three singles were released from the album: "Electricity" in July 1997, "I Think I'm in Love" in January 1998, and "Come Together" in July 1998. Spiritualized re-recorded the songs "Come Together" and "Broken Heart" (the former with a cleaner radio mix and the latter with an Ennio Morricone-styled string and horn section) at Abbey Road Studios in early 1998; these tracks comprised the band's Abbey Road EP released in August 1998. The title track of the album appeared in the 2001 Cameron Crowe film Vanilla Sky.

In October and December 2009, Spiritualized performed Ladies and Gentlemen We Are Floating in Space live in its entirety as part of the All Tomorrow's Parties-curated Don't Look Back concert series. To coincide with the shows, a remastered legacy edition of the album with new artwork was released on 30 November 2009 in three formats: a one-disc release of the original album; a three-disc release featuring the original album and two bonus discs containing demos, instrumental versions, and session mixes of the album's songs; and a special collector's edition release limited to 1,000 copies consisting of twelve 3" mini CDs, each containing one of the original album's songs, and the aforementioned two CDs of bonus content. Reviewing the reissue, Pitchfork critic Grayson Haver Currin wrote that on Ladies and Gentlemen We Are Floating in Space, Pierce "unequivocally reached the height of his recorded powers." Spiritualized later performed the full album again at the All Tomorrow's Parties festival in May 2010, curated by Matt Groening. When ranking the band's discography, Stereogum said, "[This] was always destined to be number one. Because Ladies And Gentlemen We Are Floating In Space is a perfect album."

In 2019, Far Out ranked the album number 29 on their list of "The 50 Best Shoegaze Albums of All Time". In 2020, Rolling Stone ranked the album number 13 on their list of "Greatest Stoner Albums of All Time". The album was included in the book 1001 Albums You Must Hear Before You Die. In 2013, NME ranked it at number 156 in its list of the 500 Greatest Albums of All Time. In 2024, Paste ranked the album number 140 on their list of "The 300 Greatest Albums of All Time".

== Track listing ==
All tracks are written by Jason Pierce, except for track 1, co-credited with George David Weiss, Hugo Peretti, and Luigi Creatore.

No.	Title	Length
1.	"Ladies and Gentlemen We Are Floating in Space (I Can't Help Falling in Love)"	3:54 (Note: The original 1997 pressing of the album features the edited version of the song without the intended Elvis Presley lyrics; that version runs 3:40, does not have the subtitle "(I Can't Help Falling in Love)", and did not need to credit Weiss/Peretti/Creatore. This brings the album's run time down to 69:41.)
2.	"Come Together"	4:40
3.	"I Think I'm in Love"	8:10
4.	"All of My Thoughts"	4:36
5.	"Stay with Me"	5:08
6.	"Electricity"	3:45
7.	"Home of the Brave"	2:35
8.	"The Individual"	4:02
9.	"Broken Heart"	6:38
10.	"No God Only Religion"	4:21
11.	"Cool Waves"	5:06
12.	"Cop Shoot Cop…"	17:00
Total length:		70:03

2009 edition – bonus disc one
No.	Title	Length
1.	"Ladies and Gentlemen We Are Floating in Space" (A cappella)	2:33
2.	"Ladies and Gentlemen We Are Floating in Space" (demo)	2:54
3.	"Ladies and Gentlemen We Are Floating in Space" (strings)	1:40
4.	"Ladies and Gentlemen We Are Floating in Space" (Kate telephone call)	1:21
5.	"Ladies and Gentlemen We Are Floating in Space" (Moles Studio mix 7)	4:48
6.	"Ladies and Gentlemen We Are Floating in Space" (original Oratone ideas)	0:42
7.	"Ladies and Gentlemen We Are Floating in Space" (A cappella with lead vocal)	1:57
8.	"Come Together" (instrumental demo)	3:18
9.	"Come Together" (demo in lower key)	4:02
10.	"I Think I'm in Love" (original demo idea)	1:01
11.	"I Think I'm in Love" (demo)	2:04
12.	"I Think I'm in Love" (drums/wah)	4:16
13.	"I Think I'm in Love" (a cappella)	1:38
14.	"I Think I'm in Love" (vocal demo January 1996)	3:31
15.	"I Think I'm in Love" (gospel choir session)	1:18
16.	"All of My Thoughts" (demo)	3:52
17.	"All of My Thoughts" (strings)	0:38
18.	"Rocket Shaped Song"	8:16

2009 edition – bonus disc two
No.	Title	Length
1.	"Electricity" (demo)	3:34
2.	"Electricity" (January 1996)	5:07
3.	"Electricity" (June 1996)	4:55
4.	"Home of the Brave" (demo)	3:48
5.	"Home of the Brave" (panned vocal)	2:40
6.	"Beautiful Happiness"	5:14
7.	"Broken Heart" (demo)	2:15
8.	"Broken Heart" (strings)	1:52
9.	"Broken Heart" (vocal harmony/Angel Corpus Christi)	2:41
10.	"Broken Heart" (early vocal)	0:50
11.	"No God Only Religion" (demo)	4:05
12.	"No God Only Religion" (horns)	2:48
13.	"Cool Waves" (demo)	1:00
14.	"Cool Waves" (string session mix)	6:10
15.	"Cop Shoot Cop…" (demo)	2:47
16.	"Cop Shoot Cop…" (Dr. John The National Anthem)	6:22
17.	"Cop Shoot Cop…" (string session mix)	3:46

== Personnel ==
=== Spiritualized ===
- Jason Pierce – vocals, guitars (Fender Telecaster, Fender Jaguar, Vox Starstream, Gibson Firebird), hammered dulcimer, piano, autoharp
- Kate Radley – organs (Farfisa Compact, Vox Continental), piano, Roland D-20 synthesizer, backing vocals
- Sean Cook – Fender Jazz bass guitar, harmonica
- Damon Reece – drums, percussion, timbales, bells, timpani

=== Additional musicians ===
- John Coxon – guitars (Fender Jaguar, Gibson Firebird), melodica, Roland JD-800 synthesizer
- Ed Coxon – violin
- B.J. Cole – pedal steel guitar
- Angel Corpus Christi – accordion
- Andy Davis – Hammond organ
- Dr. John – piano and backing vocals on "Cop Shoot Cop..."
- Simon Clarke – flute, baritone saxophone
- Tim Sanders – tenor saxophone
- Terry Edwards – tenor saxophone
- Roddy Lorimer – trumpet, flugelhorn
- Neil Sidwell – trombone
- Tim Jones – French horn
- The Balanescu Quartet (Alexander Balanescu, Clare Connors – violins; Kathy Burgess – viola; Sophie Harris – cello)
- London Community Gospel Choir – choir

=== Technical ===
- Jason Pierce – arrangement, horn arrangements, string arrangements, choral arrangements, production, mixing
- John Coxon – production on "Stay with Me" and "The Individual"
- Darren Allison – engineering, mixing
- Chad Bamford – engineering, mixing
- Mads Bjerke – engineering, editing, post-production
- Trevor Curwen – engineering, mixing
- John Leckie – engineering, mixing
- Patrick McCarthy – engineering, mixing
- Patrick McGovern – engineering, mixing
- Carl Nappa – engineering
- Darren Nash – engineering, assistant engineering, assistant mixing
- Lem Lattimer – assistant engineering
- Chris Scard – assistant engineering
- Ray Staff – mastering
- Simon Clarke – horn arrangements
- Clare Connors – string arrangements
- Ed Coxon – horn arrangements
- Basil Hughes – choral arrangements
- Tim Sanders – horn arrangements

== Singles ==
- "Supplementary Dosage" (June 1997; US promo-only CD)
1. "Cop Shoot Cop" (Live)
2. "Shine a Light" (Live)
3. "Electric Mainline" (Live)
4. "Cool Waves" (Instrumental)
5. "The X-Files Theme"
- "Broken Heart" (July 1997; UK promo-only CD)
1. "Broken Heart" (Instrumental)
- "Electricity" (28 July 1997)

CD1

1. "Electricity" (Edit)
2. "Take Your Time" (Live)
3. "All of My Tears" (Live)
4. "Cool Waves" (Instrumental)

CD2

1. "Electricity"
2. "Cop Shoot Cop" (Live)
3. "Shine a Light" (Live)
4. "Electric Mainline" (Live)
- "I Think I'm in Love" (2 February 1998)
1. "I Think I'm in Love" (Edit)
2. "I Think I'm in Love" (The Chemical Brothers Remix)
3. "I Think I'm in Love" (The Chemical Brothers Instrumental)
- "Come Together" (17 July 1998)
1. "Come Together" (Richard Fearless Remix)
2. "Come Together" (Two Lone Swordsmen Remix)
- The Abbey Road EP (14 August 1998)
1. "Come Together" (Abbey Road Version)
2. "Broken Heart" (Abbey Road Version)
3. "Broken Heart" (Instrumental; Abbey Road Version)

== Charts ==
Chart (1997)	Peak position
Swedish Albums (Sverigetopplistan)	41
UK Albums (Official Charts)	4
US Heatseekers Albums (Billboard)	26
