= Spiritualized =

English space rock band

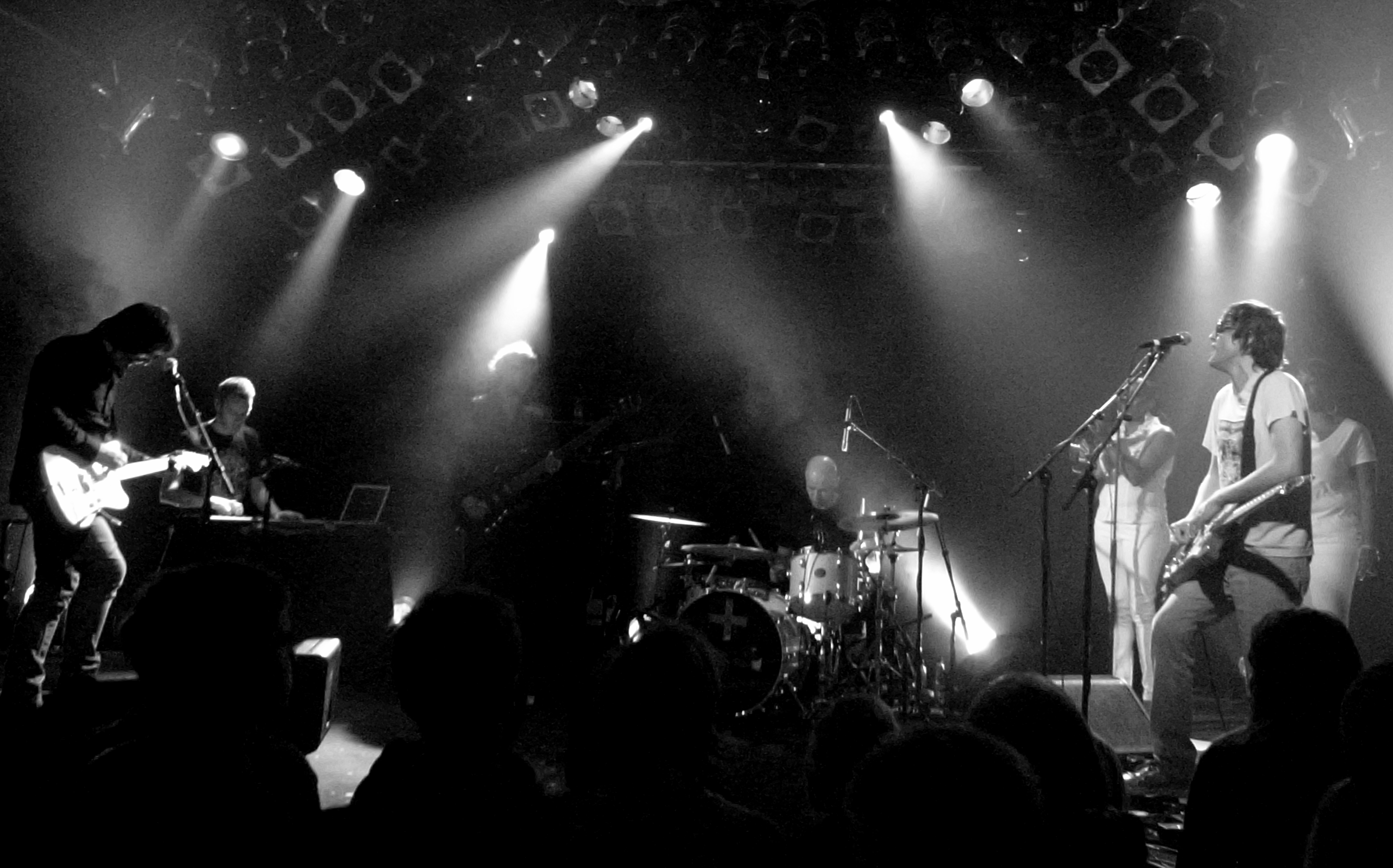
- Spiritualized performing in Malmö, Sweden during the Songs in A&E tour, 2008.

Background information
- Origin: Rugby, England
- Genres: Space rock revival; neo-psychedelia; experimental rock; garage rock; shoegaze
- Years active: 1990–present
- Labels: Dedicated; Double Six; Fat Possum; Bella Union
- Spinoff of: Spacemen 3
- Members: Jason Pierce; Doggen Foster; John Coxon; Kevin Bales; James Stelfox; Tom Edwards
- Past members: Will Carruthers; Thighpaulsandra; Jonny Mattock; Mark Refoy; Kate Radley; Greg Coulson; Sean Cook; Jonny Aitken; Mike Mooney; Gregg Hale; Damon Reece; Ray Dickaty; Thomas Wayne; Sam Freeman; Richard Warren
- Website: spiritualized.com

Spiritualized (stylised as Spiritualized®) are an English rock band formed in 1990 in Rugby, Warwickshire, by Jason Pierce (often known as J. Spaceman), formerly of Spacemen 3. The band had fluid personnel in its early years but by 1999 became centred on Pierce (vocals, guitar), Doggen Foster (guitar) and Kevin Bales (drums and percussion), with revolving bassists and keyboardists. Bassist James Stelfox has been playing with the band since 2012.

As of 2023, Spiritualized have released nine studio albums. The best known and most critically acclaimed of these is 1997's Ladies and Gentlemen We Are Floating in Space, which NME magazine named as their Album of the Year.

== History ==
=== Formation: 1990–1991 ===
Following a breakdown in relations between Spacemen 3 co-frontmen Peter Kember and Jason Pierce, the group's bassist Will Carruthers, drummer Jonny Mattock, and guitarist Mark Refoy were asked by Pierce to form a new group alongside local friend Steve Evans, subsequently calling themselves Spiritualized. The band took their name from an adaptation of the text on the back label of a bottle of Pernod. Due to formation from a majority of Spacemen 3 members, a technical clause meant that Spiritualized had to maintain the Spacemen 3 recording contract with Dedicated Records.

The first Spiritualized release, in 1990, was a cover of The Troggs' "Anyway That You Want Me"; the record heralded the official split of Spacemen 3 following contractual wrangles over the band's name and its use in Spiritualized-related promotional material (initial copies of "Anyway That You Want Me" came with a Spacemen 3 logo on the sleeve).

=== First releases: 1992–1998 ===
Evans was replaced on keyboards by Pierce's then-girlfriend Kate Radley for the follow-up single, "Run"/"I Want You". A number of singles followed, before the band, in early 1992, released their first LP Lazer Guided Melodies, which had been recorded in Rugby over the previous two years. Carruthers left the band before the release of the album and was replaced by Sean Cook in time for touring with The Jesus & Mary Chain after the release of the album.

A second album, Pure Phase, was released in 1995, and a third, Ladies and Gentlemen We Are Floating in Space emerged in 1997 to critical acclaim and commercial success. Following promotional activity for Ladies And Gentlemen We Are Floating in Space, Gregg Hale left the band on good terms and remains friends with current members, but Sean Cook, Damon Reece and Michael Mooney threatened a strike in protest over low salaries and appearance fees. New contracts of employment were drawn up between Pierce and the musicians, and the same contracts were then used to fire them (to general disbelief by the music press at the time). In response, Cook, Reece and Mooney formed Lupine Howl. On 15 June 1997, Spiritualized became the last band to play at Factory Records' Manchester nightclub The Haçienda.

=== Development: 1999–2010 ===
Retaining only keyboardist Thighpaulsandra (keyboards), Jason Pierce then debuted a new line up of Spiritualized, introducing classical percussionist Tom Edwards and former Julian Cope string arranger Martin Schellard on bass guitar. Completing the new Spiritualized line-up were guitarist Doggen Foster of Brain Donor and the Julian Cope band, Richard Warren and drummer Kevin 'Kevlar' Bales, who is also a member of Brain Donor. Jonny Aitken stepped in on drums for the recording of Amazing Grace while Kevin Bales was recovering from illness. Chris Davis of Six By Seven & Spotlight Kid also stepped in for Kevin for two major festival appearances. Let It Come Down included over 120 musicians. Amazing Grace favoured a more stripped-down sound with the gospel, blues, and soul influences even more dominant than before.

After several years of work and Pierce's serious illness in July 2005, the album, Songs in A&E was released on 26 May 2008 in the UK, and on 27 May 2008 in the US. The first single from the 18-track album was "Soul on Fire". The release was backed by an Electric Mainlines UK tour which began in May. Pierce has also scored Harmony Korine's 2008 film Mister Lonely. In October and December 2009 the band performed 1997's "Ladies and Gentlemen We Are Floating in Space" live in its entirety as part of the All Tomorrow's Parties-curated Don't Look Back series.

=== Recent releases: 2011–present ===
After more than two years in the making, while Pierce was undergoing experimental chemotherapy for a liver disease, and including a year long period of mixing, Sweet Heart Sweet Light was released in April 2012, on Double Six Records and Fat Possum in North America. The band had already played some of this new material over the past 3 years but not much else was known about the content of the album. The album cover, an octagon surrounding the word "Huh?" on a plain white background, is a reference to the working title of the album. In an interview regarding the new release it was revealed that the album would "embrace" more poppy songs compared to previous albums. In the same interview, Jason Pierce also said that the album was partly inspired by the experiences of performing "Ladies and Gentlemen We Are Floating in Space" live in its entirety. In 2013, Jeremy McMahan (Dirty Blood, C is for Cookie) was brought in to some sessions to play bass.

And Nothing Hurt is the band's eighth studio album released on 7 September 2018 through Bella Union in the United Kingdom and Fat Possum Records in the United States, and is the band's first album in six years. The album was announced on 11 June 2018, along with the release of the album's first singles, "I'm Your Man" and "A Perfect Miracle" and was produced by Jason Pierce.

On 2 November 2021, the band announced their ninth studio album, Everything Was Beautiful, slated for release on 25 February 2022 through Bella Union/PIAS Recordings. The seven-track album was previewed by a single called "Always Together With You", which is a reworked version of a song from 2014 which was originally heard in demo form. On 3 February 2022, the release date was delayed to 22 April 2022, due to manufacturing issues.

== Musical style ==
The band's sound has been labelled as space rock, neo-psychedelia, experimental rock and garage rock. Their first album was also described by NME as being distantly connected to shoegaze.

== Legacy ==
The earlier work of Spiritualized is considered instrumental in the development of dream pop and post-rock subgenres that developed throughout the 90s. They have been cited as an influence to bands such as Sigur Rós and Do Say Make Think.

== Discography ==
Studio albums

- Lazer Guided Melodies (1992)
- Pure Phase (1995)
- Ladies and Gentlemen We Are Floating in Space (1997)
- Let It Come Down (2001)
- Amazing Grace (2003)
- Songs in A&E (2008)
- Sweet Heart Sweet Light (2012)
- And Nothing Hurt (2018)
- Everything Was Beautiful (2022)
