= Gretsch Drums =

American drum company

- Product type: Drum kits and hardware
- Current owner: Gretsch
- Country: United States
- Introduced: 1883; 143 years ago
- Website: gretschdrums.com

Gretsch Drums is a division of American musical instrument manufacturer Gretsch.

== History ==
Gretsch was founded in 1883 by Friedrich Gretsch, a German immigrant. Its earliest products included banjos, drums, tambourines, and toy musical instruments. After the death of Friedrich, his son, Fred Gretsch Sr. took over the company and expanded the string instrument line to include guitars and mandolins.

Early adopters of Gretsch included jazz drummers Jo Jones, Chick Webb, and Billy Gladstone. With Gladstone, Gretsch introduced a line of drums with a unique three-way tuning system. These Gretsch-Gladstone drums, as they were sometimes marketed, included a specialized key could change the tension of the top head, bottom head, or both at the same time.

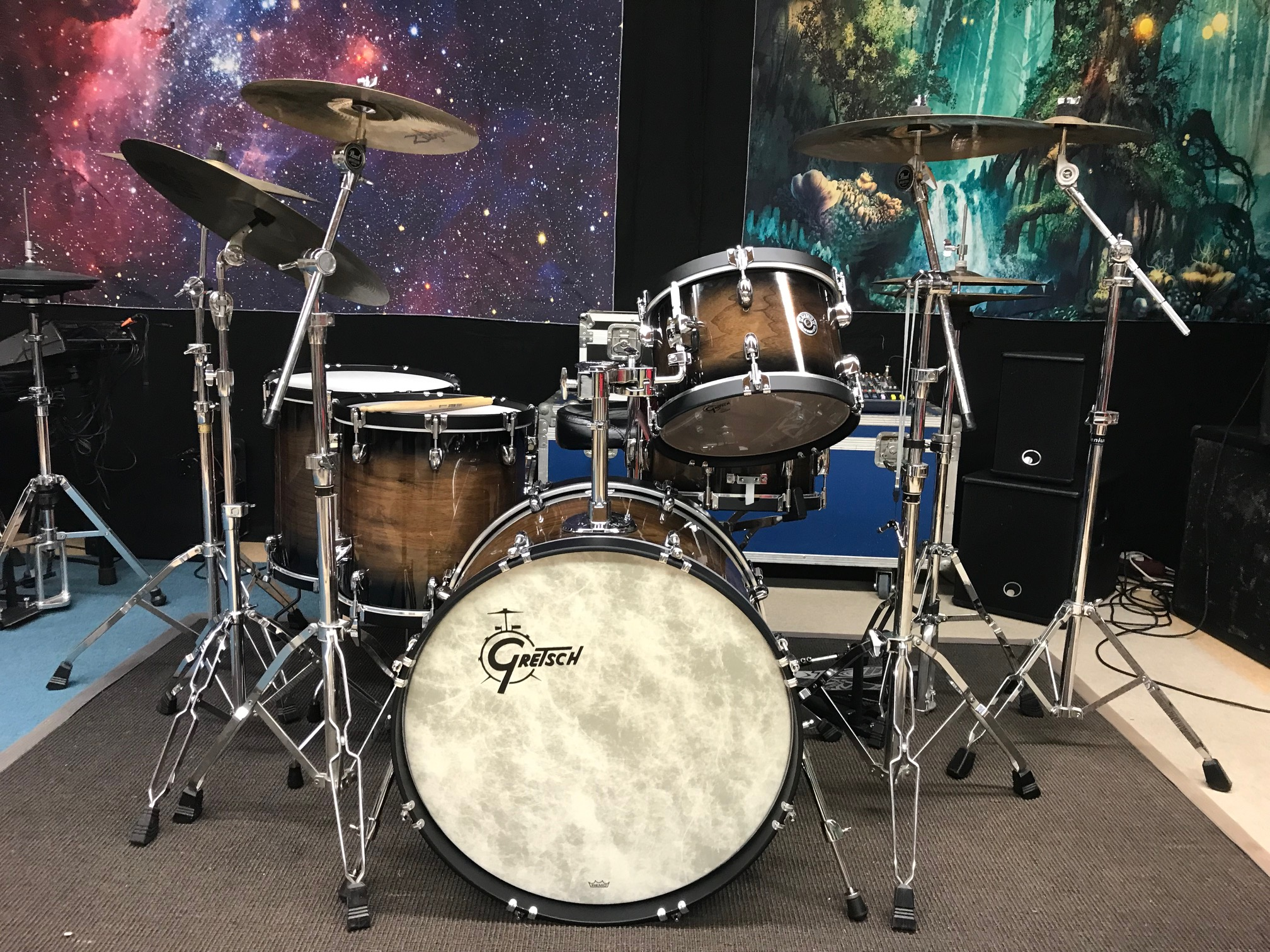
A Gretsch Catalina Special Edition kit

Fred Gretsch Jr. ran the company until 1967, when Gretsch was sold to the Baldwin Piano Company. In 1969, Baldwin moved Gretsch instrument manufacturing operations from Brooklyn to a plant in De Queen, Arkansas.

In 1985, Gretsch was bought back by a member of the Gretsch family, Fred W. Gretsch, the son of the late William "Bill" Gretsch and great-grandson of original company founder Friedrich Gretsch. At that time, drum production was relocated from De Queen to Ridgeland, South Carolina, where it remains today.

Gretsch bought the remnants of the Slingerland Drum Company, which was later sold to Gibson, with Gretsch retaining the Leedy Manufacturing Company brand, which had been part of the Slingerland purchase.

In 2000, Gretsch entered into an agreement with Kaman Music, which granted them exclusive rights to manufacture their USA Custom and Signature models. Fender acquired Kaman Music Corporation (KMC) in 2008 and subsequently sold the licensing rights for Gretsch in 2014 to Drum Workshop. Starting in January 2015, Drum Workshop became the exclusive manufacturer and worldwide distributor of Gretsch Drums. In 2017, Hal Leonard became the exclusive US distributor of the Renown, Catalina, and Energy series drums.

In January 2024, the license to distribute, market, and manufacture Gretsch Drums was sold by Drum Workshop to GEWA Music.

== Products ==
=== Cymbals ===
Gretsch sold cymbals from the 1910s into the 1970s under the Ajaha brand.

== See also ==
- List of drum makers
