= Pat Fish =

English musician (1957 - 2021)

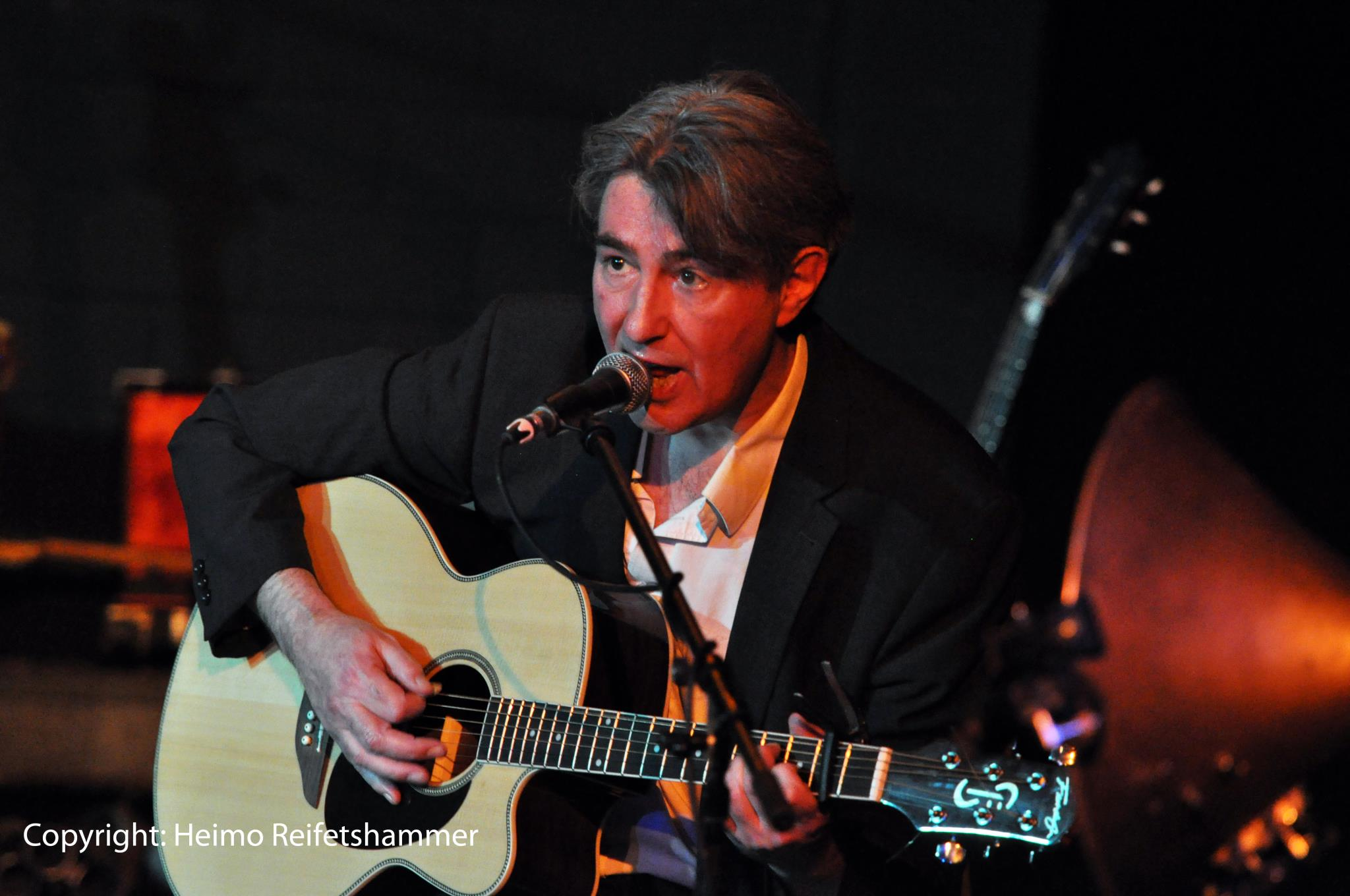
Pat Fish in 2013

Patrick Huntrods (20 December 1957 – 5 October 2021), known as Pat Fish, was an English musician best known for his work as a member of the band The Jazz Butcher. (The name "Jazz Butcher" has been applied ambiguously both to Fish and the whole band.)

== Early career ==
Fish was born in London, England but moved early in his life to Northampton; there he attended Great Houghton Preparatory School and later Uppingham; he later read Lit. Hum. at Merton College, Oxford, graduating in 1980. From the evidence of an interview given in 1989, it would seem that he found academic life at Oxford uninspiring, and that he was soon drawn to making music. His bands in the early period included one known as Nightshift, and the Institution, which featured Max Eider (Peter Millson) on guitar, Rolo McGinty (later of The Woodentops), and Jonathan Stephenson. The Sonic Tonix became The Tonix, who released a single, "Strangers / Talk to Me" on the independent 109 Product label (STEG 002) in 1981.

The persona of the "Jazz Butcher" was devised soon after, and Fish's first gig under this guise was in Oxford on 20 February 1982. The band included Alice Thompson, later keyboardist in The Woodentops, and later still a novelist, and Owen Jones, who was to become the Jazz Butcher's drummer for much of the 1980s. Max Eider, a crucial element in the early Butcher sound, joined for a gig in June of that year.

In 1985, Fish took on production duties on the recording of the Black Mischief EP for fellow Northampton musicians, The Love Ambassadeux.

The next significant phase of Fish's career began on 27 November 1986 when musical and personal tensions between him and Eider, exacerbated by long touring and drinking, led to Eider's departure in Zürich. Fish rebuilt the Jazz Butcher band, recruiting Kizzy O'Callaghan as guitarist; saxophonist Alex Green was the only other element of continuity with the earlier band. Around this time his contract with Glass Records ended, and he signed to Alan McGee's Creation Records, at that time one of the foremost indie labels in Britain.

In 1989, Fish hosted an indie music show called Transmission, which was produced by Music Box Ltd. for ITV and pan-European British station Super Channel.

== 1990s and beyond ==
The Jazz Butcher continued to gig regularly in the early 1990s and to record for Creation until 1995, but by the late 1990s Fish was feeling restricted both by the "Jazz Butcher" name (McGee had persuaded him to keep it on joining Creation), and by guitar pop. Creation's success with My Bloody Valentine's Glider EP created an opportunity to develop his interest in dance music. His first foray was the Jazz Butcher Conspiracy's cover version of The Rolling Stones' "We Love You", was released under the name "JBC" in 1990 (CRE083T), and later included in the Creation dance compilation "Keeping the Faith" (CRECD 081) (1991). Soon afterwards the somewhat mysterious "Black Eg" project began: an album of ambient dance music built around synthesizers and samples, purporting to be the work of one Karel von Dammerung of Vienna, was released by Creation in 1991. The Black Eg themselves made their live debut on 1 June 1994 at Soundshaft in London.

In the early 1990s Fish diversified his activities in other ways. He produced at least one record, the single "Lost at Sea" by 13 Frightened Girls (recorded in 1990 and released in 1991). He appeared on recordings by other bands, contributing a flute solo to "I Love You" on Spacemen 3's Recurring (1991), and guitar and organ on The Blue Aeroplanes' Rough Music (1995).

By 1996, Fish had formed a new band with other Northampton-based musicians, eventually settling on the name Sumosonic. One of the other names he had considered, "Audio-Aquatic", surfaces in the lyrics to their debut single, "Come, Friendly Spacemen", released by Creation on 5 December 1996 (CRESCD 242). The band had their live debut in London 11 March 1997. Though the band included Fish as a guitarist, their sound was built far more around sequencers, and the rhythms were more dance-orientated. The lyrics, however, displayed Fish's customary wit, political awareness, and sense of melancholy absurdity. Much of their first and only album, This is Sumo, had been recorded in demo form by September 1996; the studio version was released on 26 January 1998 (CRECD 204). The vocal melodies, even when sung by other members of the band, have many of the characteristics of Jazz Butcher tunes. There are also clear continuities with the Black Eg material: "Destroy All Monsters", a song about French nuclear arms testing the Pacific, borrows melodic elements from the earlier outfit's "Bel Air."

Sumosonic were not well supported by Creation, and were dropped after their first album. The last gig noted on the band's website was 19 September 1998. However, members of the band continued to work with Fish as the band Wilson, whose live debut, on 1 March 2001, included the previous band's "God's Green Earth." Wilson have continued to gig regularly in Northampton, Oxford, and London.

== Death ==
According to a post on Fish's official Facebook page on 6 October 2021, he "died suddenly but peacefully yesterday evening." On 3 October, Fish was scheduled to perform a web concert, however at show time, Fish appeared live to inform his audience he was not feeling well and would be rescheduling the performance for the following week. By means of explanation for his ill health, he offered that he had been suffering from sleep apnea.

It was later reported that Fish had died of a heart attack.

== Sources ==
- Cavanagh, David. The Creation Records Story (London: Virgin, 2001)
- Green, Dominic, and Nick Johnson, 'The Jazz Butcher', Isis no.3 (Oxford), (Trinity Term 1989), p. 33.
- Whiteside, William. "Who is The Jazz Butcher", The Independent (London) (8 Aug 2001).
