= Giant (The Woodentops album) =

Studio album by The Woodentops
- Released: June 1986
- Recorded: 1985
- Studio: The Roundhouse, Camden; Power Plant Studios, Willesden
- Genre: Indie rock
- Length: 45:42
- Label: Rough Trade
- Producer: Bob Sargeant

The Woodentops chronology
Giant (1986)	Wooden Foot Cops on the Highway (1988)

Giant is the debut album by British rock band the Woodentops.

The album reached No. 35 on the UK Albums Chart, spending 4 weeks on the chart.

== Critical reception ==
Professional ratings
Review scores
Source	Rating
AllMusic	4.5/5 stars
Record Mirror	4/5
The Rolling Stone Album Guide	4.5/5 stars
Smash Hits	9 3/5/10
Sounds	3/5 stars
The Village Voice	B

Giant featured in the 1986 end of year critics polls in the NME and Melody Maker at numbers 36 and 16 respectively.

In the 1992 Rolling Stone Album Guide, J. D. Considine wrote: "Giant refines the band's sound, fleshing out the arrangements with occasional splashes of color ... but never messes with its essential energies. It's the writing that carries the album, though, thanks to infectious numbers like 'Love Train,' 'History' and 'Love Affair with Everyday Living'". AllMusic critic David Cleary deemed Giant the Woodentops' best album and said that it "explores a wide range of variations on the band's signature manic pop style, here adding occasional marimba, trumpet, accordion, and strings to the mix", also praising its "utterly inspired" production.

== Track listing ==
All tracks composed by Rolo McGinty.

1. "Get It On"
2. "Good Thing"
3. "Give It Time"
4. "Love Train"
5. "Hear Me James"
6. "Love Affair with Everyday Living"
7. "So Good Today"
8. "Shout"
9. "History"
10. "Travelling Man"
11. "Last Time"
12. "Everything Breaks"

== Personnel ==
The Woodentops

- Rolo McGinty – vocals, guitar
- Frank de Freitas – bass, voice
- Simon Mawby – guitar, voice
- Benny Staples – drums, voice
- Alice Thompson – keyboards, voice

with:

- Chucho Merchan – double bass
- Jack Emblow – accordion
- Bob Sargeant – marimba
- Steve Sidwell – trumpet
- Danny Schogger – strings
