= Tales from Bective Bridge =

First edition (publ. Michael Joseph)

Tales from Bective Bridge is a collection of ten short stories concerning rural Ireland and its populace by the writer Mary Lavin, born an American, who returned along with her family to Ireland in 1925.

The collection was first published in 1942, with the assistance of Lord Dunsany, who also wrote the introduction. The collection established her as a writer of note and won the James Tait Black Memorial Prize in 1943.

The bridge of the title, Bective Bridge, lies not far from what was her home, Abbey Farm, near Bective Abbey, between Bective and Robinstown in County Meath.

== Bibliography ==
- Tales From Bective Bridge, Little, Brown, 1942
- Tales From Bective Bridge. Faber & Faber. 15 May 2012. ISBN 978-0-571-29531-9.
