= Bective, County Meath =

Small hamlet and townland in County Meath, Ireland

Bective Beigthigh
- Village
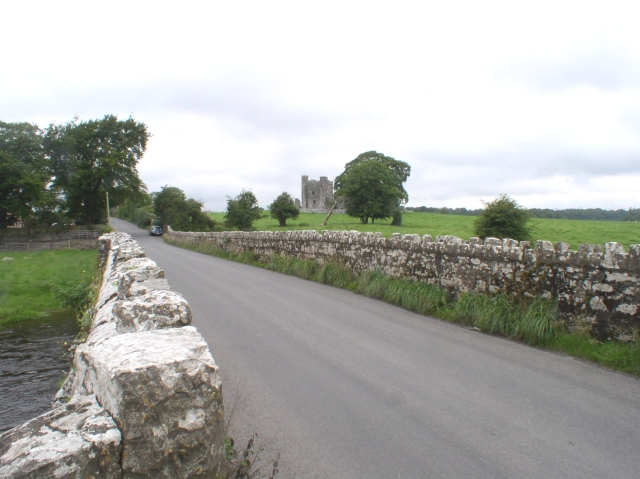
- View towards Bective Abbey

- Location in Ireland
- Coordinates: 53°34′47″N 6°41′50″W
- Country: Ireland
- Province: Leinster
- County: County Meath
- Elevation: 53 m (174 ft)
- Time zone: UTC+0 (WET)
  - Summer (DST): UTC-1 (IST (WEST))
- Irish Grid Reference: N862596

Bective (Irish: Beigthigh; sometimes known as Bective Bridge or Ballina) is a small hamlet and townland in County Meath, Ireland. Bective is situated on the left bank of the River Boyne and on the Clady River which joins the former in the east of the townland, approximately 6 kilometres east of Trim, on the Athboy to Dunshaughlin road. The village is in a civil parish of the same name.

== Sport ==
The local Gaelic football club, Bective GFC, have won 3 consecutive senior titles in a row. The club's U15 team plays in division 3, the third highest there is in the county.

== Abbey ==
Bective is home to Bective Abbey, daughter abbey of the better-known Cistercian abbey at Mellifont in County Louth.

== Notable people ==
The village was also home to the writer Mary Lavin, whose family moved there in 1925. Bective formed the setting for her first and most enduring collection of short stories, Tales from Bective Bridge. The Skurlocke (or Sherlock) family were the local landowners in the sixteenth and seventeenth centuries.

== See also ==
- List of towns and villages in Ireland
