= The Jazz Butcher =

British musical group

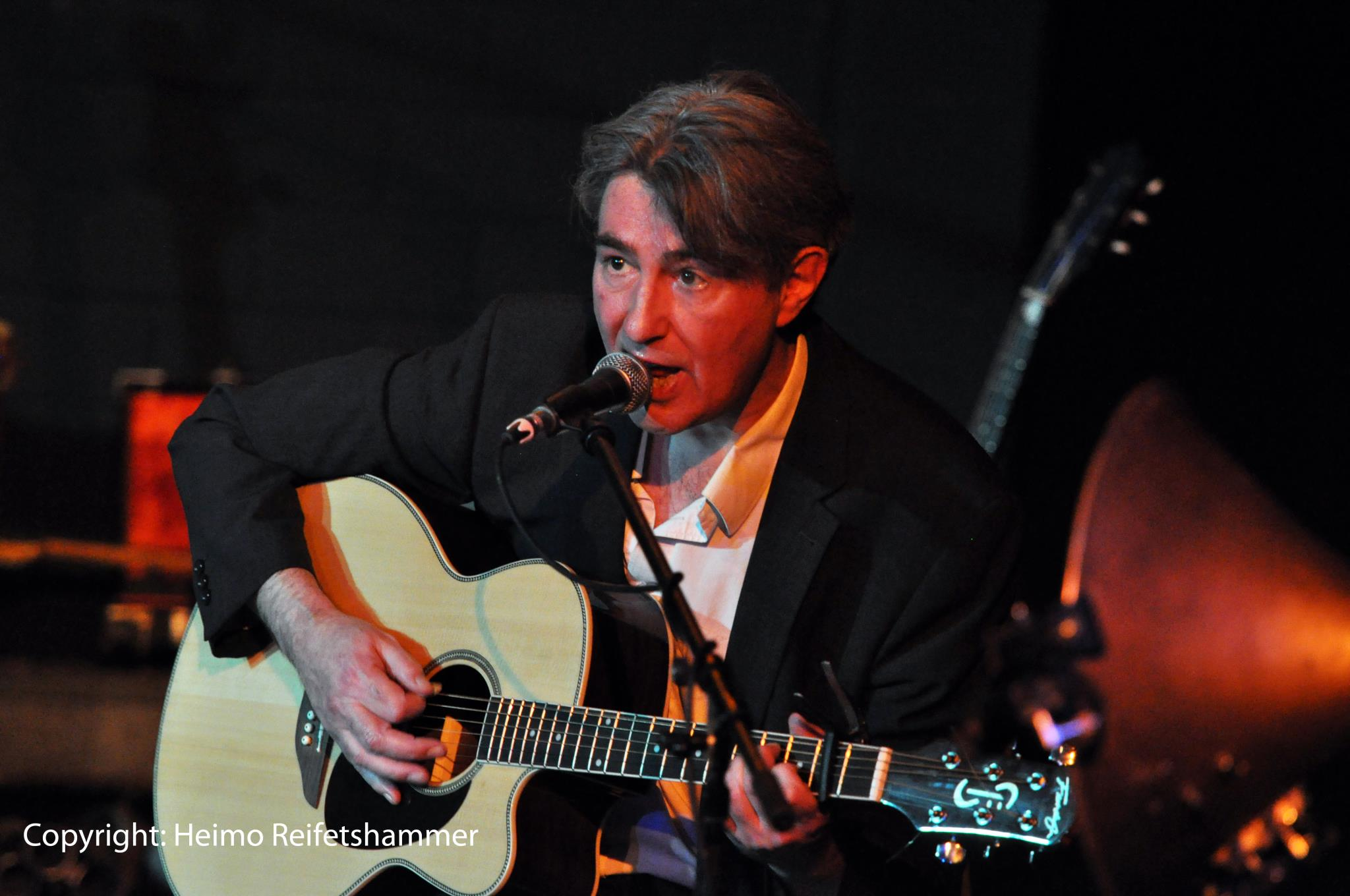
- Fish in 2013

Background information
- Also known as: The Jazz Butcher Conspiracy; The Jazz Butcher Group; The Jazz Butcher And His Sikkorskis From Hell; The JBC; The Jazz Butcher Quartet; The Jazz Butcher Quintet
- Origin: Oxford, England/ Northampton, England
- Genres: Indie pop; jangle pop
- Years active: 1982–2000; 2012; 2021
- Labels: Glass; Creation; Vinyl Japan; Fire; Big Time; ROIR; Tapete; Cherry Red
- Past members: Pat Fish; Max Eider; Owen Jones; David J Kevin Haskins; Rolo McGinty; Alice Thompson; Felix Ray; Kizzy O'Callaghan; Laurence O'Keefe; Paul Mulreany; Alex Green; Alex Lee; Richard Formby; Joe Allen; Sumishta Brahm; Peter Astor; Dooj Wilkinson; Nick Burson; Peter Crouch; Tim Harries; Gabriel Turner; Dave Henderson; Curtis E. Johnson; Pat Bierne; Curtis E. Johnson; Steven D. Valentine; Russell Cooper; Simon Taylor; Steve New; Joe Woolley; Steve Garofalo; Jonny Mattock; Dave Morgan
- Website: jazzbutcher.com

The Jazz Butcher was the alias of British singer/songwriter Pat Fish (20 December 1957 – 5 October 2021). It has also been the name of the band, though adjuncts were frequently used to distinguish between Fish's persona and band itself (The Jazz Butcher Conspiracy or JBC, the Jazz Butcher Group, the Jazz Butcher and his Sikkorskis from Hell, the Jazz Butcher Quartet and the Jazz Butcher Quintet).

The line-up of the band changed frequently, with Pat Fish being the only constant. Notable members included band co-founder Max Eider (Peter Millson), David J. (Haskins), Owen P. Jones, Rolo McGinty, Alice Thompson, Paul Mulreany, Alex Green, Richard Formby, Kizzy O'Callaghan, Curtis E. Johnson and Peter Crouch.

== History ==
=== Formation ===
The band were formed in Oxford in 1982 by Pat Fish and Max Eider. Having met at university, Fish and Eider had previously been in bands the Institution, along with Rolo McGinty (later of The Woodentops), and The Sonic Tonix (later The Tonix) with John Silver.

Upon the breakup of The Tonix, Fish moved to Northampton, a place he described as "seething with creativity, backed by a supportive local press". He began writing songs, and the first advertised Jazz Butcher performance took place at Merton College in Oxford, on 20 February 1982. Both the name and the gig itself were "perceived as a one-off laugh". Shortly thereafter, Fish reconnected with Eider, only to find that Eider’s playing style had changed to a "rich, clean, country soul sound with just a touch of Wes Montgomery", which complemented the kinds of songs Fish had been writing at that time.

Around this time, Fish began recording songs using an Amstrad 7090 audio cassette recorder. The purpose of the device was to dub the contents of one cassette to another; however, Fish discovered that the microphone channel remained open, so that he could add multiple parts with each pass.

These primitive "multi-track" recordings were enough to interest David Barker, who invited Fish to record an album for his newly founded Glass Records label.

=== The Glass years (1982–1987) ===
In August / September 1982, Fish and several friends and collaborators began recording the first Jazz Butcher album at Starforce Studio in Clapham. This was co-produced by Fish and Barker (under the pseudonym Lionel Brando); contributors included Eider, McGinty, Silver, Alice Thompson, Ian Sturgess, Louis Leroi and engineer Martin K. Daley.

On 1 November 1982, Fish was approached to open for fellow Northampton band Bauhaus. The whimsical nature of the Jazz Butcher band did not impress the headliners' goth followers. "The massed audience listened politely, if disconcertingly quietly", reported the Northampton Mercury and Herald. Fish was "pleased to survive the experience". Fish had assumed that Bauhaus drummer Kevin Haskins had arranged their spot on the bill, as Kevin and Fish were friends, only to find that it was Haskins' brother David J. who had taken an interest in The Jazz Butcher.

In Bath of Bacon was released in March 1983. The album, according to Fish, was "the sound of a few mates failing to take seriously the fact they they've got an LP to make". A review in The Scotsman called Bath "quite good fun, if you don't mind being used in someone else's experiment."

In early 1984, Fish and Thompson recorded a number of cover songs, mostly by Lou Reed, John Cale and Kevin Ayers in what would be known as the “Cak Bag” sessions. Many of these appeared on Glass Record compilations and fan magazines throughout the year.

The summer of 1983 found Fish and Eider back in the studio with McGinty and Thompson (who had now formed The Woodentops), joined by Kevin Haskins on drums. The result was the single "Southern Mark Smith". The single gained some national recognition, having been played on “hit-maker” John Peel’s radio show.

Glass also released two singles in 1984: "Marnie" and "Roadrunner" (Jonathan Richman). The B-side for "Roadrunner" featured the Max Eider song "D.R.I.N.K.", which became a fan favorite.

David J.'s friendship with Fish and continued interest in the Jazz Butcher group prompted discussions of J. producing the Butcher's next LP. However, the dissolution of Bauhaus corresponded with an opening in the bassist’s role. The line-up of Fish, Eider, Jones and David J. would be regarded as the first “official” line-up, and remain so for much of 1984 into 1985.

Produced by John A. Rivers, A Scandal in Bohemia was released in November 1984. With the help of Rivers and J., the band improved upon their studio technique. Eider’s guitar style had also strengthened since A Bath of Bacon, becoming less "ornamental" and more of an “essential element” to the Jazz Butcher’s sound of that time. The album shares its title with the first Sherlock Holmes short story, and features a memorable cover by comic artist Hunt Emerson. According to Fish, "We were young(ish) and cocky and I think it shows….Still, it was cheap and cheerful, and it helped us to meet an awful lot of people". The record ended up selling over 20,000 copies.

The cohesion of a "proper" band, David J's Bauhaus notoriety, and the success of Scandal led to a more ambitious touring schedule. 1985 was also a prolific time for the band in the studio, releasing the singles "Real Men" and "The Human Jungle," as well as the live album Hamburg (credited to The Jazz Butcher and His Sikkorskis from Hell). Glass released The Gift of Music, which compiled many of the band's singles and B-sides, including a re-recording of "Partytime", which was a staple of their live performances.

The Jazz Butcher also released Sex and Travel, again recorded with John A. Rivers as producer. "One day's rehearsal in Kevin Haskin's living room, five days' recording and two days' mixing was all it took for us to make my favourite of the Glass records,” said Fish in 1993.

In February 1985, David J left the band to form Love and Rockets, and Graham "Felix" Fudger was brought in as his replacement as the band continued with a tour schedule that was three times the year prior: 110 shows in 1985, as compared to 36 shows in 1984.

In 1986, the band released singles for "Hard", "Conspiracy", "Angels", and the fan club–only release "Christmas with the Pygmies", as well as appearing on compilation albums, such as 50,000 Glass Fans Can't Be Wrong (which also features solo songs by David J. and Max Eider). Bloody Nonsense, a compilation of B-sides, was released in America and Canada, finding its way onto the college charts.

In May 1986, The Jazz Butcher returned to the studio with John A. Rivers to record their next LP, Distressed Gentlefolk. The extensive touring had honed the band’s skills, but according to Fish, they were also exhausted and went into the studio with "a scanty armful of tunes", many ideas having already been released as singles. Rivers had embraced the digital revolution, which was reflected in the production. Fish and Eider had both been focused on their song writing, but their styles had begun to drift apart, with Fish leaning toward a heavier sound, and Eider maintaining a quieter, more jazz-influenced style.

Touring continued, including America and Canada for the first time in 1986. The popularity of the band was growing, but the effort was taking its toll. Fudger was replaced on bass by Richard Lohan, and Alex Green joined the band on saxophone. On 22 November 1986, after a show in Zurich, Switzerland, personal tensions, alcohol and exhaustion boiled over into a physical fight between Fish and Eider, resulting in the lead guitarist quitting the band. The tour continued without the lead guitarist and concluded on Fish's birthday, 20 December. Shortly thereafter, Jones tendered his resignation.

Soon afterwards, Fish's contract with Glass Records expired but not before the release of Big Questions - The Gift of Music Volume 2, another compilation of singles and B-sides.

The success of Bloody Nonsense and Distressed Gentlefolk, especially in America, led Eider to sign as a solo artist to the Jazz Butcher’s US distributor, Big Time Records. This proved unpropitious, as the record company folded shortly after having released Eider's Best Kisser in the World. The lack of funds for promotion doomed sales of Eider's first solo effort.

Meanwhile, Fish and Alex Green were fulfilling touring obligations throughout Europe as a duo, at venues which were largely expecting a band. According to Fish, "For the most part, it was a matter of making the best of things and getting out alive".

Alan McGee, head of Creation Records, was in attendance at the show in Paris on 10 February 1987. He had specifically come with an offer to sign Fish, whose Glass contract was about to expire.

=== The Creation years (1988–1998) ===
"The Jazz Butcher is one of the most brilliant incisive pop writers that Britain has produced since the glory days of Ray Davies and Pete Townshend" - Alan McGee, co-founder of Creation Records.

The deal with Creation offered Fish the opportunity to reform the Jazz Butcher outfit. Kizzy O’Callahan had served as a guitar tech during the previous incarnation of the band, and Fish was already familiar with his skill as a guitarist. On Alan McGee's recommendation, the rhythm section of Dave Goulding (bass) and Dave Morgan (drums) were borrowed from fellow Creation band the Weather Prophets as the band went in to record the next album. Alex Green on saxophone rounded out the core of the studio group, with other friends and musicians making contributions, including Sonic Boom of Spacemen 3, bassist Laurence O'Keefe and members of the Perfect Disaster. Pat considered shedding the "Jazz Butcher" moniker, wishing to put some distance between the new outfit and some of the sillier material of his Glass Records days. However, McGee insisted "...that's the one they all know, you've got to keep it."

Having felt that Distressed Gentlefolk suffered from over-production, Fish set out to make a record that had a more rough and straightforward sound. Longtime Jazz Butcher photographer Mitch Jenkins took the cover photo, which shows Fish and O'Callahan in front of London fish-and-chip shop Fishcotheque, which would provide the name of the new LP. Reviewers (particularly in the US) perceived it as a continuation of the smooth, jazz-influenced approach of his earlier efforts. Still, reviews for Fishcotheque were generally positive. 1988 also saw the release of the single and video for "Spooky", a cover of the Classics IV song. Spooky was also released on an EP that also included several songs recorded for a live performance on the Canadian radio program Brave New Waves.

In 1987, Fish married Barbara J Taylor in a small ceremony in Northamptonshire.

Paul Mulreany was added to the live line-up, and with Fish fronting a new band on a new label, the JBC spent most of 1988 touring Europe, the US and Canada.

For the next album, Big Planet Scarey Planet, Fish returned to producer John A. Rivers. After a year of touring, Fish reasoned "We'd hardened up a lot and figured we could now withstand the Rivers' treatment". The band wanted to make a rock record that reflected some of their influences of the time, such as hip-hop and proto-acid. "Consequently, there are some weird hybrids on the 'Big Planet' record," Fish recalled. The song "Line of Death", for example, incorporated middle eastern influence, disco, heavy metal and a nod to Ennio Morricone's ""The Good, the Bad and the Ugly". The artwork for Big Planet Scarey Planet and its single, "New Invention" was created by Pascal Legras. who would be responsible for much of the Jazz Butcher's cover art throughout the 1990s.

Just prior to a nine-week tour of the US, Kizzy O'Callahan was admitted to the hospital, where he was diagnosed with a brain tumor. He was replaced by Richard Formby.

While in Los Angeles, the band was interviewed on Deirdre O'Donoghue's popular alternative rock show SNAP! on KCRW. While the band agreed they would perform only one or two songs, "...we get down there to KCRW and meet Deirdre O'Donoghue and she's a real fan and she kept winding us up," recounted Fish, "we ended up doing 12 or 13". Those live recordings would end up as the fourth disc of the box set Dr. Cholmondley Repents (2022).

The incarnation of the band that recorded Cult of the Basement had been together for some time and just finished a lengthy tour. Some songs which would appear on the album, such as "Girl Go" and "Mr. Odd", had been road-tested; others, such as "She's on Drugs" and "Sister Death", existed in demo form, and much of the rest of the album was developed from band improvisation. The result was an album that was more "sprawling" stylistically. Fish commented "I feel it's the first time we captured the true sound of the band". "She's on Drugs" enjoyed airplay on college radio, and a video for "Girl-Go" aired on MTV's alternative music showcase 120 Minutes in America. "Girl-Go", which makes musical and lyrical reference to the Perfect Disaster's "All the Stars", was released as a single. The B-side, "Excellent", marked the last time O'Callahan would play with the band. He died of a brain tumor in 1993.

1991 saw the release of the eponymous album by Black Eg. Credited to the fictional Von Dämmerung brothers, it was an album of ambient dance music built around synthesizers and samples. The Black Eg themselves made their live debut on 1 June 1994 at Soundshaft in London.

The band toured to promote Cult of the Basement, first in Europe, followed by a US tour with the Blue Aeroplanes, where they alternated as opener/headliner city by city. Upon his return home, Fish's marriage began to fall apart, eventually ending in divorce. Much of the next album, Condition Blue, dealt with darker subject matter, a reflection of Fish's mental state at the time. According to Fish, "I'm still well pleased with it as a recording, and as a piece of writing about a tough subject. I mean, *I* hate 'divorce rock' too."

The Basement incarnation of the band had gone their separate ways after the Blue Aeroplanes tour, so once again, Fish found himself re-building his band. The basic tracks were recorded by Fish, Mulreany on drums, Alex Lee on guitar and Joe Allen on bass. A slew of contributors old and new came in to play on the record, including Formby, O'Keefe and Green; Glass-era drummer Owen Jones; Peter Astor, Sumishta Brahm, and Peter Crouch among others. Two singles emerged from the album, "She's a Yo-Yo" and "Shirley Maclaine". On the US version of the CD, "She's a Yo-Yo" serves as the opening track, flipping the A- and B-sides of the European release. This was a judgement on the part of the record company to lead with a "hit song". "It makes no sense at all," said Fish, "and I totally agree with the reviewers who say it (the album) peters out." The album was less whimsical than previous albums, containing more of the band's "art misery" songs. Overall, it was "warmly received by The Outside World," according to Fish, "less popular among those who counted themselves JBC aficionados."

Once again, Fish found himself needing to re-build the band. Peter Crouch, who had played on Condition Blue came on board as guitarist, with Dooj Wilkenson and Nick Burson on bass and drums. This third incarnation of the JBC toured the United States (which resulted in the live release, Western Family), and in January 1993 went chose Richard Formby's Woodhouse Studios to record what would become Waiting For the Love Bus. Whereas Fish went into the Condition Blue sessions with several demos and a long list of backing players, Love Bus saw Fish with very little material, and a small, but tight group of musicians. The result was an album with, according to Fish, "a clean, simple sound...that Condition Blue detractors might appreciate." Unlike its predecessor, most of whose tracks clocked in at over six minutes, Waiting For The Love Bus is composed mostly of short, straightforward pop tunes.

The rest of 1993 was spent briefly touring Europe and sporadic gigs closer to home. During this time, Peter Crouch left the band to be replaced by Curtis E. Johnson, and Nick Burson moved to Canada and was replaced on drums by Gabriel Turner. Guitarist Dave Henderson joined the line-up in 1994, as The Jazz Butcher Conspiracy went into the studio to record their 10th album, Illuminate. The intention of the band was to create a more "down to earth" album than its sprawling predecessors. Illuminate's songs include punk rants against the Tory government, pop songs about dolphins, salutes to Brian Eno and Hammer Films, and an imaginary utopian past, where dinosaurs rule a "world without people". The album was produced by David J., and released on 3 April 1995; it produced one single, "Sixteen Years".

Meanwhile, the Creation label had gained the reputation for releasing many critically acclaimed albums, with very few being commercial hits. McGee sold half the company to Sony Music. Shortly thereafter, Creation signed the band Oasis, who became a huge critical and commercial success. Their second album, (What's the Story) Morning Glory?, became the biggest-selling British album of the decade. According to Fish, support from Sony/Creation began to wane: "Honestly, there wasn't enough time in the day to do anything other than handle Oasis business."

Fish and Max Eider had begun to mend fences in the mid-1990s, and July 1995 saw Max Eider opening for the JBC at a gig in London. He was brought onstage for an encore of "Zombie Love", marking the first time they'd played together since Eider left the group in 1986. Pat and Max soon found themselves playing together occasionally again as a duo.

Despite the reunion with his former partner, Fish felt the Jazz Butcher moniker was limiting his musical exploration. Seeking to create another vehicle for himself, he formed the band Sumosonic. This was a stylistic shift from the JBC, making use of samplers, synthesizers and sequencers. A single, "Come, Friendly Spacemen", was released in 1996, with the album This is Sumo appearing in 1998. Sumosonic was much more dance/techno driven, yet Fish's lyrics contained many of the hallmarks of the Jazz Butcher material. Sales of This is Sumo were dismal. Alan McGee had begun to see the result of operations being handled by Sony accountants and marketing managers, and how it was affecting less commercial artists on the Creation label. Fish received a letter from McGee suggesting a parting of the ways: "We'd better jack it in before you get bitter," Fish recounts. By March 1998, Fish was no longer signed to Creation. The next year, Creation ceased operations. Without the support of a label, Sumosonic played their final show in September 1998.

=== Rotten Soul (1999–2000) ===
In 1999, Pat received an invitation from Vinyl Japan to record an album for their label. The budget, according to Fish, was about 10% of what it cost to make Cult of the Basement. Former guitarist Peter Crouch had, at this time, been recording demos on a digital multi-track recorder. Fish thought this might be an effective means of recording an album within the budget parameters. This approach presented several limitations, most notably the use of MIDI drums, "the sound of which is not clever" according to Fish. Mixing the album was also challenging, as the home recorder lacked effects and nuance. The resulting album, Rotten Soul, was generally criticized for its poor production, though it was warmly embraced by the fans.

On 9 September 1999, Fish, Eider, Owen Jones, and David J. and Kevin Haskins performed at the Troubadour in Los Angeles. This was the first time the "original line-up" had performed together since David J left the band in 1985. In 2000, Fish, Eider and Jones did a small tour of the US in support of the Rotten Soul album, with Steven D. Valentine on Bass.

=== Wilson (2001–2011) ===
Fish continued to seek a creative outlet outside of the Jazz Butcher, and in 2001 the group Wilson formed. Composed of members of Sumosonic, and other Northampton bands, Wilson expanded on the Sumosonic sound.

2002 marked the 20th anniversary of the JBC, which the band marked by playing a handful of gigs in Germany and Belgium.

In 2009, Wilson performed its last show before disbanding, which was recorded and released as No Known Predators on DVD. A one-off reunion show promoted the release of the DVD in 2012, and marked the last time Wilson would perform.

=== Last of the Gentleman Adventurers (2012–2013) ===
2012 marked the band's 30th anniversary. Fish and Eider decided to recognize the occasion with a new studio album, their first in over a decade. Not having the support of a record company, they decided to raise the funds themselves via PledgeMusic. Uncertain if they still had the fan support to raise the money, Fish was trepidatious as the fundraiser was launched. "By the time I went to bed that night," Fish recalled, "we were at something like 120 percent."

Last of the Gentleman Adventurers was recorded in August and September 2012 at Richard Formby's studio in Leeds. Tim Harries and Jonny Mattock were brought in as the rhythm section, with Formby on guitar, and contributions from Owen Jones and Sonic Boom. Liner notes were provided by Fish's friend, author and fellow Northampton resident, Alan Moore.

The album sold its original pressing of 500, and another 500 were pressed. Around this time, Fire Records became interested, not only in the new album, but the Butcher's entire back catalogue. Fish had been given the rights to his albums by both David Barker and Alan McGee, and so a deal was made to sell the Glass and Creation albums, as well as Gentleman Adventurers to Fire Records.

Around this time, Fish began playing with Steve New and Steve Garofalo, and were soon joined by Simon Taylor on trumpet to form the Jazz Butcher Quartet. Eider joined the band for the occasional gig in support of Gentleman Adventurers, but ultimately retired from live performance. His last appearance was on 21 August 2014, in Brixton.

In January 2016, Garofalo died. Outings for the quartet became fewer and far between, joined on drums by Dave Morgan and others.

=== Fire Records reissues, Live From Fishy Mansions (2017–2021) ===
2017 saw the first of the Fire Records reissues, with a four-disc box set titled The Wasted Years. This set, with extensive liner notes by Fish, contained the albums Bath of Bacon, A Scandal in Bohemia, Sex & Travel, and Distressed Gentlefolk. Each album was also released individually on vinyl.

in 2018, The Violent Years was released (not to be confused with the Creation-era compilation CD of the same name). This set contained the first four Creation releases: Fishcotheque, Big Planet Scarey Planet, Cult of the Basement, and Condition Blue.

In November 2018, Fish received a cancer diagnosis. He was given a treatment of radiotherapy and chemotherapy, and in June 2020 received a letter of remission.

His illness, followed by the COVID-19 pandemic, had largely prevented Fish from performing regularly. In July 2020 he began what would become a series of concerts from his living room, streamed live for fans around the world. "Live From Fishy Mansions" featured Fish solo performing old songs and new, covers and requests, and these performances drew a couple of hundred viewers from around the world, including fans, friends and former bandmates.

=== Death, The Highest in the Land (2021–2022) ===
On 26 June 2021, Fish and company went into the studio to record what would become The Highest in the Land. Contributors included Max Eider, Dave Morgan, Tim Harries, Stevie Gordon, Joe Woolley, Simon Taylor, and Peter Crouch. Lee Russell was brought on to produce.

On 3 October 2021, Fish cancelled a scheduled "Fishy Mansions" show, citing exhaustion from a lack of sleep, possibly caused by sleep apnea. The session was rescheduled for the following Sunday. On 5 October, Fish suffered a heart attack and died at his home in Northampton. He was interred at Olney Green Burial Ground on 4 November.

Tapete released the song "Time" on 9 October 2021.

A third box set, Dr. Cholmonley Repents; A-Sides, B-Sides and Seasides was released on November 12, 2021. This set was a compilation of singles and B-sides, as well as a live in-studio broadcast recorded at KCRW on December 6, 1989.

The Highest in the Land was released on 4 February 2022.

=== Tributes ===
On 27 November 2021, at the Dublin Castle in London, a show that Fish had been scheduled to perform became a tribute show. Performers included Joe Turner, Tim Keegan, Pete Astor, Rolo McGinty, Bid of the Monochrome Set, Peter Crouch, Sumishta Brahm, and Dave Morgan.

In May 2022, Miracles and Wonders: A Meandering, Cacophonous Concordance of The Jazz Butcher Songbook by Pat Fish and Philip Snow was published. The book contains Fish's recollections of albums, songs and events spanning the Jazz Butcher's nearly 40-year history. Fish passed away shortly before the book's completion.

An alternate version of "Never Give Up" was released on Glass Modern on 7 October 2022.

=== Since 2021 ===
On 17 December 2025, it was announced that guitarist Max Eider had died.

== Lyrical themes ==
His literary references include Arthur Conan Doyle, Christopher Isherwood, John Keats, Flann O'Brien, Thomas Pynchon, Hans Stefan Santesson, St. Francis of Assisi, and the Book of Common Prayer. Fish was known for his fondness for animals, particularly cats, who appear often in his songs. There are many pop-culture references in the Jazz Butcher's music: TV shows such as The Human Jungle, movies such as Blood from the Mummy's Tomb, celebrities (Shirley MacLaine, Peter Lorre, Edie Sedgwick), musicians (Alice Cooper, Lionel Richie, Lemmy, David Bowie, Prince, Brian Wilson), and political figures (Margaret Thatcher, Olof Palme, Dan Quayle, Oliver North). Fish's love for the monster/horror genre (perhaps sparked by a family friend association with Hammer film director Terence Fisher, whom Fish referred to as "Uncle Terry") is evidenced in songs like "Zombie Love", "The Jazz Butcher Meets Count Dracula", "Panic in Room 109", and many others.

== Discography ==
=== Albums ===
- In Bath of Bacon (1983), Glass
- A Scandal in Bohemia (1984), Glass
- Sex and Travel (1985), Glass – UK Indie No. 25
- Distressed Gentlefolk (1986), Glass – UK Indie No. 15
- Fishcotheque (1988), Creation
- Big Planet Scarey Planet (1989), Creation
- Cult Of The Basement (1990), Creation
- Black Eg (1991), Creation (under the name Black Eg)
- Condition Blue (1992), Creation
- Waiting for the Love Bus (1993), Creation
- Illuminate (1995), Creation
- Rotten Soul (2000), Vinyl Japan
- Last of the Gentleman Adventurers (2012), self-released
- The Highest in the Land (2022), Tapete

=== Singles ===
- "Partytime" (1983), Glass
- "Southern Mark Smith" (1983), Glass
- "Marnie" (1984), Glass
- "Roadrunner" (1984), Glass – UK Indie No. 50
- "Zombie Love" (1984)
- "Affection" (1984)
- "Real Men" (1985), Glass – UK Indie No. 34
- "The Human Jungle" (1985), Glass – UK Indie No. 27
- "Christmas with the Pygmies" (1985)
- "Leaving It Up to You" (1985)
- "Hard" (1986), Glass – UK Indie No. 24
- "Angels" (1986), Glass
- "The Devil Is My Friend" (1986), Big Time
- "Peter Lorre" (1986)
- "Spooky" (1988), Creation – UK Indie No. 19
- "New Invention" (1989), Creation
- "Girl Go" (1990), Creation
- "We Love You" (1990), Creation
- "She's a Yo-Yo" (1991), Skyclad
- "Shirley MacLaine" (1991)
- "Sweetwater" (1993)
- "Vodka Girls" (1994)
- "Sixteen Years" (1995), Creation
- "All The Saints" (2016), Fire
- "Never Give Up" (2022), Glass Modern

=== EPs ===
- Conspiracy (1986), Glass – UK Indie No. 42
- May I (1987)

=== Live ===
- Hamburg (1985), Rebel
- Western Family (1993), Creation
- Glorious and Idiotic (2000), ROIR

=== Compilations ===
- The Gift of Music (1985), Glass
- Bloody Nonsense (1986), Big Time
- Big Questions (Gift of Music, Vol. 2) (1987), Glass
- Spooky (1988), Creation/Canadian Broadcasting Corporation
- Edward's Closet (1991), Creation
- Unconditional (1992)
- Draining the Glass (1996), Nectar
- !Excellent! The Violent Years (1997)
- Cake City (2001), Vinyl Japan
- The Jazz Butcher's Free Lunch (2003)
- The Wasted Years (2017), Fire Records
- The Violent Years (2018), Fire Records
- Dr Cholmondley Repents: A-sides, B-Sides and Seasides (2021), Fire Records
