= Lily Powell =

English author

Lily Powell (aka Lily Powell Froissard) is an English author. Among her novels are The Bird of Paradise, which won the James Tait Black Award in 1970, and the more recent The Devil in Buenos Aires. She has collaborated with her husband, the French equestrian specialist Jean Froissard, on a number of reference books on horsemanship. These include Classical Horsemanship for Our Time (co-author) and The Horseman's International Book of Reference (co-editor).

They live in Paris, France.
