= J. Y. T. Greig =

John Young Thomson Greig (1891–1963) was a British literary scholar and award-winning biographer. He was born in Manchuria where his father was a Presbyterian missionary. He served in the First World War as an officer in the Northumberland Fusiliers. After the war, he studied at the University of Glasgow, receiving his MA in 1913, and a DLitt in 1924. Until 1931 he was on the staff of Armstrong College in Newcastle-upon-Tyne (now Newcastle University). In 1932, he moved to the University of Witwatersrand in South Africa, where he succeeded Professor Max Drennan as chair of the English Department.

Greig was a leading scholar on the Scottish philosopher David Hume. His 1931 biography of Hume won the James Tait Black Award, and he also edited Hume's letters. He also published a well-regarded biography of WM Thackeray in 1950, and a volume entitled The Psychology of Laughter and Comedy. In addition, Greig wrote four novels under the pseudonym of John Carruthers during the 1920s.
