= Max Eider =

English guitarist and songwriter (1959–2025)

Peter John Millson (21 January 1959 – 15 December 2025), better known as Max Eider, was an English guitarist and songwriter.

== Life and career ==
Eider was born on 21 January 1959. He studied English literature at University College, Oxford, graduating in Trinity Term 1980. Eider played guitar with Pat Fish (The Jazz Butcher) from June 1982 until 27 November 1986 when, after an alcohol-fuelled altercation with Fish, he left the band. He went on to record a solo album, The Best Kisser in the World, which mixes up-tempo indie pop numbers ("Let Somebody Down" and "Quiet Lives") with songs in a moodier jazz-influenced style. He also played on recordings by others, including Songs from Another Season by David J. He used the name "Michael Barrere" on a release by the Plymouth Fastbucks.

Elder rejoined Jazz Butcher for what was billed as the last ever Jazz Butcher gig on 21 December 1995. He performed and recorded with Fish since then on the live album Glorious and Idiotic (2000) and the studio album Rotten Soul. In 2002, he released a second solo album, Hotel Figueroa, and a third, Max Eider III, in 2007. In 2010, Eider released his fourth solo album, Disaffection, on Tundraducks Records.

Eider had suffered from ankylosing spondylitis since his early 20s. On 17 December 2025, it was announced that he had died by suicide on 15 December, at the age of 66, after a deterioration in health.

== Solo discography ==
- The Best Kisser in the World (1987, Big Time)
- Hotel Figueroa (2002, Vinyl Japan)
- Back In The Bedroom (2007, Tundraducks Records)
- Disaffection (2010, Tundraducks Records)
- Duckdance (2014, Tundraduck Records)
