= Wooden Foot Cops on the Highway =

Studio album by The Woodentops
- Released: 1988
- Label: Rough Trade
- Producer: Rolo McGinty, Scott Litt

The Woodentops chronology
Giant (1986)	Wooden Foot Cops on the Highway (1988)

Singles from Wooden Foot Cops on the Highway
- 1. "You Make Me Feel / Stop This Car" Released: 1988; 2. "Wheels Turning" Released: 1988

Professional ratings
Review scores
Source	Rating
AllMusic	2.5/5 stars
People	favourable

Wooden Foot Cops on the Highway is the second studio album by English rock band The Woodentops, released in 1988 by record label Rough Trade.

The album reached #48 on the UK albums chart, spending 2 weeks on the chart.

== Track listing ==
1. "Maybe It Won't Last" - 3:05
2. "They Can Say What They Want" - 4:15
3. "You Make Me Feel" - 3:09
4. "Wheels Turning" - 5:17
5. "Stop This Car" - 3:21
6. "Heaven" - 4:05
7. "What You Give Out" - 3:26
8. "Tuesday Wednesday" - 3:29
9. "In a Dream" - 3:27

== Personnel ==
The Woodentops

- Rolo McGinty - vocals, acoustic guitar, song writing
- Simon Mawby, Anne Stephenson - guitar, vocals
- Frank de Freitas - bass guitar, vocals
- Benny Staples - drums, vocals

with:

- Doug Wimbish - additional bass
- Bernie Worrell - additional Clavinet
- Fred Maher - additional percussion
- Gary Lucas - additional slide guitar
- June Miles-Kingston, Mark Lussana Tunkara - additional vocals
