= Condition Blue =

Studio album by the Jazz Butcher
- Released: 1992
- Recorded: 1991
- Genre: Pop, alternative rock, pop rock
- Label: Creation
- Producer: The Jazz Butcher

The Jazz Butcher chronology
Cult of the Basement (1990)	Condition Blue (1992)	Edward's Closet (1992)

Condition Blue is an album by the English musician the Jazz Butcher, released in 1992. "She's a Yo-Yo" was released as a single. The Jazz Butcher supported the album with a North American tour; the live album Western Family, released in 1993, documents the tour.

== Production ==
The album title is British slang for an act's exit from a performing venue. The Jazz Butcher thought that Condition Blue was his band's first album to present all of its musical characteristics and traits. He considered it to be a plea for the return of an ex-lover as well as a document of a nervous breakdown, and saw similarities between his situation and the work of Martin Amis. The Jazz Butcher was affected by the mainstream "breakup" pop—Phil Collins and Michael Bolton—that he heard in pubs while dealing with his problems and decided to create something with similar but rawer lyrical themes. His band urged him to rewrite some of the more depressing lyrics. "Our Friends the Filth" describes spycraft in 1960s Beirut. "Girls Say Yes" is an homage to the music of Dave Stewart. "Shirley MacLaine" is less about the actress than about a certain kind of self-indulgent book and self-regarding attitude. "Harlan" is named for Harlan Ellison. "Honey" expresses a desire to find a woman who will watch Twin Peaks with the Jazz Butcher.

== Critical reception ==
Professional ratings
Review scores
Source	Rating
AllMusic	2/5 stars
Calgary Herald	B+
Chicago Tribune	3/4 stars
The Encyclopedia of Popular Music	3/5 stars
The Great Indie Discography	5/10
The Philadelphia Inquirer	3.5/4 stars

The Calgary Herald said that the Jazz Butcher "writes songs that crawled out from under a rock in somebody`s garage, hook-laden pop with enough fuzz and feedback to scare yuppies away." The Chicago Tribune labeled the album the "alternative rock iconoclast's most accessible record yet." The Washington Post called it "sprightly guitar-based pop-rock", noting that "the Butcher employs a vulnerable-adolescent persona characteristic of the genre... That can be a little precious, but the Butcher and company more than compensate by getting their guitars to jingle-jangle just so."

The Gazette stated that Condition Blue is "a cheery collection of hummable ditties about the insanity that looms when a relationship falls apart." The Edmonton Journal said that the album "conveys crisp musical hooks with sardonic bon mots". The Los Angeles Times called Condition Blue "a lovely, deeply emotive record, with complex guitar interplay and sobbing saxophones accompanying the Butcher through a long melancholy drift"; the paper later named it one of the best albums of 1992. The Philadelphia Inquirer labeled it "a rare non-confectionary pop record".

== Track listing ==
No.	Title	Length
1.	"Girls Say Yes"
2.	"Our Friends the Filth"
3.	"Harlan"
4.	"Still and All"
5.	"Monkeyface"
6.	"She's a Yo-Yo"
7.	"Honey"
8.	"Shirley MacLaine"
9.	"Racheland"
