= Janet Coats Black =

Scottish poet and philanthropist (1844 to 1918)

Janet Coats Black (15 February 1844 – 15 November 1918) was a Scottish poet, philanthropist, and the founder of the James Tait Black prize, Britain's longest running literary award.

== Biography ==
Janet Coats was born in Paisley in 1844 to Thomas Coats and Margaret Glen, and was a member of the J. & P. Coats family, renowned for thread-making.

She married James Tait Black in Paisley in 1884. The couple moved to London in 1889. following the move of her husband's publishing house.

In 1899, Coats Black published a volume of poetry, titled Verses and Rhymes.

She died on 15 November 1918 aged 74. In addition to her bequest leading to the establishment of the James Tait Black literary prizes, her will included a bequest of £20,000 for a charitable fund named for her mother, a £10,000 endowment to the Thomas Coats Memorial Church in Paisley, and an endowment to finance the libraries of the Northern Lighthouse Keepers.

== Legacy ==
=== James Tait Black Prize ===
The James Tait Black Prizes originate from a bequest by Janet Coats Black to commemorate her husband James Tait Blacks's love of books. She specified the prize categories of the award, which first took place in 1919.

=== Janet Coats Black prize ===
To mark the centenary of the James Tait Black prizes in 2019, the University of Edinburgh presented the additional Janet Coats Black prize for short story writing by a matriculated postgraduate student at the University of Edinburgh.

=== Janet Coats Memorial Prize ===
The Paisley Book Festival hosts the annual poetry prize, the Janet Coats Memorial Prize.
