= Justine (Thompson novel) =

1996 novel by Alice Thompson

- First edition
- Author: Alice Thompson
- Cover artist: Max Ernst "The Robing of the Bride" (1940)
- Language: English
- Publisher: Canongate Books
- Publication date: 1996
- Publication place: United Kingdom
- Media type: Print
- Pages: 135
- ISBN: 0-86241-603-5

Justine is the debut novel of Scottish author Alice Thompson. Published in 1996 by Canongate Books it was the joint winner of the James Tait Black Memorial Prize that year.

== Plot introduction ==
Described as a postmodern, feminist variation on Marquis de Sade's book of the same name, it is set in contemporary London where the narrator, an opium-smoking art collector living in Kensington Gardens, becomes obsessed by "Justine", a portrait. Later he sees the woman herself at his mother's funeral, but she disappears, and he begins a desperate search for her. He finds her twin sister Juliette, who promises to aid him in his increasingly desperate search for her elusive sister...

== Reception ==
In The New York Times, Jennifer Kornreich writes, "This successor to the Marquis de Sade's identically titled novel says nothing new about the nature of pleasure and pain. What it more ably accomplishes is a depiction of the ghoulish transformation of a nameless London art collector from creepy predator to humble captive after he meets twin sisters who bear an uncanny likeness to the portrait of his ideal woman" and she concludes "Ultimately, however, he discovers that the dainty object of his unhinged affection is even more depraved than he is. Justine's pseudo-feminist rationale for her cruelty isn't convincing, but it is amusing, particularly when directed toward a narrator whose moral compass, guided by esthetics alone, is so horrible that we can't regret his violent end."
