= James Tait Black Memorial Prize =

British prizes for English language literature

James Tait Black Memorial Prizes
- Awarded for: Awarded for the best literature published in the United Kingdom
- First award: 1919; 107 years ago
- Website: https://james-tait-black.ed.ac.uk/

The James Tait Black Memorial Prizes are literary prizes awarded for annually for books published in the United Kingdom during the previous year – one for the best work of fictionand the other for the best biography. They, along with the Hawthornden Prize, are Britain's oldest literary awards. Based in the English Department at the University of Edinburgh in Scotland, United Kingdom, the prizes were founded in 1919 by Janet Coats Black in memory of her late husband, James Tait Black, a partner in the publishing house of A & C Black Ltd. Prizes are awarded in two categories: Fiction and Biography. A Drama prize was awarded from 2013-2019.

== History ==
From its inception, the James Tait Black prize was organised without overt publicity. There was a lack of press and publisher attention, initially at least, because Edinburgh was distant from the literary centres of the country. The decision about the award was made by the Professor Herbert Grierson, Regius Chair of Rhetoric and Belles Lettres at the University of Edinburgh. The inaugural winners were Hugh Walpole for fiction and Henry Festing Jones for biography.

Four winners of the Nobel Prize in Literature received the James Tait Black earlier in their careers: William Golding, Nadine Gordimer and J. M. Coetzee each collected the James Tait Black for fiction, whilst Doris Lessing took the prize for biography. In addition to these literary Nobels, Sir Ronald Ross, whose 1923 autobiography Memoirs, Etc. received the biography prize, was already a Nobel laureate, having been awarded the 1902 Nobel Prize in Physiology or Medicine for his work on malaria.

Prior to the 1990s there was no shortlist. The University of Edinburgh's website has a list of all books shortlisted since 1995, with the exception of 1996, where the information appears to be missing.

In August 2007 the prize ceremony was held at the Edinburgh International Book Festival.

In 2012, a third prize category was announced for Drama, with the first winner of this award announced in August 2013. For the drama category, the work had to be originally written in either English, Gaelic or Welsh, be produced first during the previous calendar year, have a playing time over one hour, and to have been performed no fewer than seven times by a professional theatre company. The selection process included input from representative from Traverse Theatre, Royal Conservatoire of Scotland, the Playwrights' Studio, Scotland and Schaubuhne Theatre. The drama prize was paused indefinitely in 2020.

In 2025, 300 books were submitted to the fiction prize and 200 for biography.

== Selection process and prize administration ==
The winners are chosen by research and teaching staff within the Department of English and Scottish Literature at the university, who are assisted by postgraduate students in the shortlisting phase, a structure that is seen to lend the prizes considerable gravitas. At the award of the 2006 prizes, at which Cormac McCarthy was a winner, McCarthy's publisher commented positively on the selection process, noting that, in the absence of a sponsor and literary or media figures amongst the judging panel, the decision is made by "students and professors, whose only real agenda can be great books and great writing". The original endowment is now supplemented by the university and, as a consequence, the total prize fund rose from 2005 awards. Each of the two annual prizes—one for fiction and one for biography—is worth £10,000.

=== Eligibility ===
For the book prizes works of fiction and biographies must be published in English. Translations are permitted. The nationality of the author does not matter, but submissions must be first published (or co-published) in Britain during the calendar year of the award. Books previously published elsewhere are elgible if they have been republished in Britain.

The category of biography is broadly defined and includes conventional biographies, autobiography, memoir and other forms of life writing.

Any given author can only win each prize once.

== List of recipients ==
Source.

Year	Fiction award	Biography award	Drama award
1919	Hugh Walpole, The Secret City	Henry Festing Jones, Samuel Butler, Author of Erewhon (1835–1902) – A Memoir (Samuel Butler)	—N/a
1920	D. H. Lawrence, The Lost Girl	G. M. Trevelyan, Lord Grey of the Reform Bill (Earl Grey)	—N/a
1921	Walter de la Mare, Memoirs of a Midget	Lytton Strachey, Queen Victoria (Queen Victoria)	—N/a
1922	David Garnett, Lady into Fox	Percy Lubbock, Earlham (autobiography)	—N/a
1923	Arnold Bennett, Riceyman Steps	Ronald Ross, Memoirs, Etc. (autobiography)	—N/a
1924	E. M. Forster, A Passage to India	William Wilson, The House of Airlie (The Earls of Airlie)	—N/a
1925	Liam O'Flaherty, The Informer	Geoffrey Scott, The Portrait of Zelide (Isabelle de Charrière)	—N/a
1926	Radclyffe Hall, Adam's Breed	Reverend Dr H. B. Workman, John Wyclif: A Study of the English Medieval Church (John Wyclif)	—N/a
1927	Francis Brett Young, Portrait of Clare	H. A. L. Fisher, James Bryce, Viscount Bryce of Dechmont, O.M. (James Bryce, 1st Viscount Bryce)	—N/a
1928	Siegfried Sassoon, Memoirs of a Fox-Hunting Man	John Buchan, Montrose (James Graham) (Note: Scholarly revision of Buchan's earlier "The Marquis of Montrose" (1913))	—N/a
1929	J. B. Priestley, The Good Companions	Lord David Cecil, The Stricken Deer: or The Life of Cowper (William Cowper)	—N/a
1930	E. H. Young, Miss Mole	Francis Yeats-Brown, The Lives of a Bengal Lancer (autobiography)	—N/a
1931	Kate O'Brien, Without My Cloak	J. Y. T. Greig, David Hume (David Hume)	—N/a
1932	Helen de Guerry Simpson, Boomerang	Stephen Gwynn, The Life of Mary Kingsley (Mary Kingsley)	—N/a
1933	A. G. Macdonell, England, Their England	Violet Clifton, The Book of Talbot (John Talbot Clifton)	—N/a
1934	Robert Graves, I, Claudius and Claudius the God	J. E. Neale, Queen Elizabeth (Elizabeth I of England)	—N/a
1935	Leo Myers, The Root and the Flower	Raymond Wilson Chambers, Thomas More (Thomas More)	—N/a
1936	Winifred Holtby, South Riding	Edward Sackville West, A Flame in Sunlight: The Life and Work of Thomas de Quincey (Thomas de Quincey)	—N/a
1937	Neil M. Gunn, Highland River	Lord Eustace Percy, John Knox (John Knox)	—N/a
1938	C. S. Forester, A Ship of the Line and Flying Colours	Sir Edmund Chambers, Samuel Taylor Coleridge (Samuel Taylor Coleridge)	—N/a
1939	Aldous Huxley, After Many a Summer	David C. Douglas, English Scholars (Note: Includes studies of antiquaries including Elias Ashmole, William Dugdale, Thomas Hearne, George Hickes, Thomas Madox, John Nalson, Edward Thwaites and Humfrey Wanley)	—N/a
1940	Charles Morgan, The Voyage	Hilda F. M. Prescott, Spanish Tudor: Mary I of England (Mary I of England)	—N/a
1941	Joyce Cary, A House of Children	John Gore, King George V (George V)	—N/a
1942	Arthur Waley, Translation of Monkey by Wu Cheng'en	Lord Ponsonby of Shulbrede, Henry Ponsonby: Queen Victoria's Private Secretary (Henry Ponsonby)	—N/a
1943	Mary Lavin, Tales from Bective Bridge	G. G. Coulton, Fourscore Years (autobiography)	—N/a
1944	Forrest Reid, Young Tom	C. V. Wedgwood, William the Silent (William the Silent)	—N/a
1945	L. A. G. Strong, Travellers	D. S. MacColl, Philip Wilson Steer (Philip Wilson Steer)	—N/a
1946	Oliver Onions, Poor Man's Tapestry	Richard Aldington, A Life of Wellington: The Duke (Arthur Wellesley)	—N/a
1947	L. P. Hartley, Eustace and Hilda	Charles E. Raven, English Naturalists from Neckam to Ray (Alexander Neckam and John Ray)	—N/a
1948	Graham Greene, The Heart of the Matter	Percy A. Scholes, The Great Dr. Burney (Charles Burney)	—N/a
1949	Emma Smith, The Far Cry	John Connell, W. E. Henley (W. E. Henley)	—N/a
1950	Robert Henriques, Through the Valley	Cecil Woodham-Smith, Florence Nightingale (Florence Nightingale)	—N/a
1951	Chapman Mortimer, Father Goose	Noel Annan, Leslie Stephen (Leslie Stephen)	—N/a
1952	Evelyn Waugh, Men at Arms	G. M. Young, Stanley Baldwin (Stanley Baldwin)	—N/a
1953	Margaret Kennedy, Troy Chimneys	Carola Oman, Sir John Moore (John Moore)	—N/a
1954	C. P. Snow, The New Men and The Masters	Keith Feiling, Warren Hastings (Warren Hastings)	—N/a
1955	Ivy Compton-Burnett, Mother and Son	R. W. Ketton-Cremer, Thomas Gray (Thomas Gray)	—N/a
1956	Rose Macaulay, The Towers of Trebizond	St John Greer Ervine, George Bernard Shaw (George Bernard Shaw)	—N/a
1957	Anthony Powell, At Lady Molly's	Maurice Cranston, Life of John Locke (John Locke)	—N/a
1958	Angus Wilson, The Middle Age of Mrs. Eliot	Joyce Hemlow, The History of Fanny Burney (Fanny Burney)	—N/a
1959	Morris West, The Devil's Advocate	Christopher Hassall, Edward Marsh (Edward Marsh)	—N/a
1960	Rex Warner, Imperial Caesar	Canon Adam Fox, The Life of Dean Inge (William Ralph Inge)	—N/a
1961	Jennifer Dawson, The Ha-Ha	M. K. Ashby, Joseph Ashby of Tysoe (Joseph Ashby)	—N/a
1962	Ronald Hardy, Act of Destruction	Meriol Trevor, Newman: The Pillar and the Cloud and Newman: Light in Winter (John Henry Newman)	—N/a
1963	Gerda Charles, A Slanting Light	Georgina Battiscombe, John Keble: A Study in Limitations (John Keble)	—N/a
1964	Frank Tuohy, The Ice Saints	Elizabeth Longford, Victoria R.I. (Queen Victoria)	—N/a
1965	Muriel Spark, The Mandelbaum Gate	Mary Caroline Moorman, William Wordsworth: The Later Years 1803–1850 (William Wordsworth)	—N/a
1966	Christine Brooke-Rose, Such; Aidan Higgins, Langrishe, Go Down	Geoffrey Keynes, The Life of William Harvey (William Harvey)	—N/a
1967	Margaret Drabble, Jerusalem the Golden	Winifred Gérin, Charlotte Brontë: The Evolution of Genius (Charlotte Brontë)	—N/a
1968	Maggie Ross, The Gasteropod	Gordon Haight, George Eliot (George Eliot)	—N/a
1969	Elizabeth Bowen, Eva Trout	Antonia Fraser, Mary, Queen of Scots (Mary, Queen of Scots)	—N/a
1970	Lily Powell, The Bird of Paradise	Jasper Ridley, Lord Palmerston (Henry Temple, 3rd Viscount Palmerston)	—N/a
1971	Nadine Gordimer, A Guest of Honour	Julia Namier, Lewis Namier (Lewis Namier)	—N/a
1972	John Berger, G	Quentin Bell, Virginia Woolf (Virginia Woolf)	—N/a
1973	Iris Murdoch, The Black Prince	Robin Lane Fox, Alexander the Great (Alexander the Great)	—N/a
1974	Lawrence Durrell, Monsieur: or, The Prince of Darkness	John Wain, Samuel Johnson (Samuel Johnson)	—N/a
1975	Brian Moore, The Great Victorian Collection	Karl Miller, Cockburn's Millennium (Henry Cockburn)	—N/a
1976	John Banville, Doctor Copernicus	Ronald Hingley, A New Life of Chekhov (Anton Chekhov)	—N/a
1977	John le Carré, The Honourable Schoolboy	George Painter, Chateaubriand: Volume 1 – The Longed-For Tempests (François-René de Chateaubriand)	—N/a
1978	Maurice Gee, Plumb	Robert Gittings, The Older Hardy (Thomas Hardy)	—N/a
1979	William Golding, Darkness Visible	Brian Finney, Christopher Isherwood: A Critical Biography (Christopher Isherwood)	—N/a
1980	J. M. Coetzee, Waiting for the Barbarians	Robert B. Martin, Tennyson: The Unquiet Heart (Alfred Tennyson)	—N/a
1981	Salman Rushdie, Midnight's Children; Paul Theroux, The Mosquito Coast	Victoria Glendinning, Edith Sitwell: Unicorn Among Lions (Edith Sitwell)	—N/a
1982	Bruce Chatwin, On the Black Hill	Richard Ellmann, James Joyce (James Joyce)	—N/a
1983	Jonathan Keates, Allegro Postillions	Alan Walker, Franz Liszt: The Virtuoso Years (Franz Liszt)	—N/a
1984	J. G. Ballard, Empire of the Sun; Angela Carter, Nights at the Circus	Lyndall Gordon, Virginia Woolf: A Writer's Life (Virginia Woolf)	—N/a
1985	Robert Edric, Winter Garden	David Nokes, Jonathan Swift: A Hypocrite Reversed (Jonathan Swift)	—N/a
1986	Jenny Joseph, Persephone	Dame Felicitas Corrigan, Helen Waddell (Helen Waddell)	—N/a
1987	George Mackay Brown, The Golden Bird: Two Orkney Stories	Ruth Dudley Edwards, Victor Gollancz: A Biography (Victor Gollancz)	—N/a
1988	Piers Paul Read, A Season in the West	Brian McGuinness, Wittgenstein, A Life: Young Ludwig (1889–1921) (Ludwig Wittgenstein)	—N/a
1989	James Kelman, A Disaffection	Ian Gibson, Federico García Lorca: A Life (Federico García Lorca)	—N/a
1990	William Boyd, Brazzaville Beach	Claire Tomalin, The Invisible Woman: The Story of Nelly Ternan and Charles Dickens (Ellen Ternan and Charles Dickens)	—N/a
1991	Iain Sinclair, Downriver	Adrian Desmond and James Moore, Darwin (Charles Darwin)	—N/a
1992	Rose Tremain, Sacred Country	Charles Nicholl, The Reckoning: The Murder of Christopher Marlowe (Christopher Marlowe)	—N/a
1993	Caryl Phillips, Crossing the River	Richard Holmes, Dr Johnson and Mr Savage (Samuel Johnson, Richard Savage)	—N/a
1994	Alan Hollinghurst, The Folding Star	Doris Lessing, Under My Skin (autobiography)	—N/a
1995	Christopher Priest, The Prestige	Gitta Sereny, Albert Speer: His Battle with Truth (Albert Speer)	—N/a
1996	Graham Swift, Last Orders; Alice Thompson, Justine	Diarmaid MacCulloch, Thomas Cranmer: A Life (Thomas Cranmer)	—N/a
1997	Andrew Miller, Ingenious Pain	R. F. Foster, W. B. Yeats: A Life, Volume 1 – The Apprentice Mage 1865–1914 (W. B. Yeats)	—N/a
1998	Beryl Bainbridge, Master Georgie	Peter Ackroyd, The Life of Thomas More (Thomas More)	—N/a
1999	Timothy Mo, Renegade, or Halo2	Kathryn Hughes, George Eliot: The Last Victorian (George Eliot)	—N/a
2000	Zadie Smith, White Teeth	Martin Amis, Experience (autobiography)	—N/a
2001	Sid Smith, Something Like a House	Robert Skidelsky, John Maynard Keynes: Volume 3 – Fighting for Britain 1937–1946 (John Maynard Keynes)	—N/a
2002	Jonathan Franzen, The Corrections	Jenny Uglow, The Lunar Men: The Friends Who Made the Future 1730–1810 (Lunar Society of Birmingham)	—N/a
2003	Andrew O'Hagan, Personality	Janet Browne, Charles Darwin: Volume 2 – The Power of Place (Charles Darwin)	—N/a
2004	David Peace, GB84	Jonathan Bate, John Clare: A Biography (John Clare)	—N/a
2005	Ian McEwan, Saturday	Sue Prideaux, Edvard Munch: Behind the Scream (Edvard Munch)	—N/a
2006	Cormac McCarthy, The Road	Byron Rogers, The Man Who Went Into the West: The Life of R. S. Thomas (R. S. Thomas)	—N/a
2007	Rosalind Belben, Our Horses in Egypt	Rosemary Hill, God's Architect: Pugin and the Building of Romantic Britain (Augustus Pugin)	—N/a
2008	Sebastian Barry, The Secret Scripture	Michael Holroyd, A Strange Eventful History (The families of Ellen Terry and Henry Irving)	—N/a
2009	A. S. Byatt, The Children's Book	John Carey, William Golding: The Man Who Wrote Lord of the Flies (William Golding)	—N/a
2010	Tatjana Soli, The Lotus Eaters	Hilary Spurling, Burying the Bones: Pearl Buck in China (Pearl Buck)	—N/a
2011	Padgett Powell, You and I	Fiona MacCarthy, The Last Pre-Raphaelite: Edward Burne-Jones and the Victorian Imagination (Edward Burne-Jones)	—N/a
2012	Alan Warner, The Deadman's Pedal	Tanya Harrod, The Last Sane Man: Michael Cardew, Modern Pots, Colonialism and the Counterculture (Michael Cardew)	Tim Price, The Radicalisation of Bradley Manning
2013	Jim Crace, Harvest	Hermione Lee, Penelope Fitzgerald: A Life (Penelope Fitzgerald)	Rory Mullarkey, Cannibals
2014	Zia Haider Rahman, In the Light of What We Know	Richard Benson, The Valley: A Hundred Years in the Life of a Family	Gordon Dahlquist, Tomorrow Come Today
2015	Benjamin Markovits, You Don't Have to Live Like This	James Shapiro, 1606: Shakespeare and the Year of Lear (William Shakespeare)	Gary Owen, Iphigenia in Splott
2016	Eimear McBride, The Lesser Bohemians	Laura Cumming, The Vanishing Man: In Pursuit of Velázquez (Diego Velázquez)	David Ireland, Cyprus Avenue
2017	Eley Williams, Attrib. and other stories	Craig Brown, Ma'am Darling: 99 Glimpses of Princess Margaret (Princess Margaret)	Tanika Gupta, Lions and Tigers
2018	Olivia Laing, Crudo	Lindsey Hilsum, In Extremis: The Life and Death of the War Correspondent Marie Colvin (Marie Colvin)	Clare Barron, Dance Nation
2019	Lucy Ellmann, Ducks, Newburyport	George Szirtes, The Photographer at Sixteen (autobiography)	Yasmin Joseph, J'Ouvert
2020	Shola von Reinhold, Lote	Doireann Ní Ghríofa, A Ghost in the Throat (autobiography)	-
2021	Keith Ridgway, A Shock	Amit Chaudhuri, Finding the Raga: An Improvisation on Indian Music	-
2022	Barbara Kingsolver, Demon Copperhead	Daryl Pinckney, Come Back in September: A Literary Education on West Sixty-Seventh Street, Manhattan	-
2023	Alexis Wright, Praiseworthy	Iman Mersal, Traces of Enayat (translated by Robin Moger); Ian Penman, Fassbinder: Thousands of Mirrors	-
2024	Lucas Rijneveld, My Heavenly Favourite (translated by Michele Hutchison)	Lamia Ziadé, My Great Arab Melancholy (translated by Emma Ramadan)	-
2025	Shady Lewis, On the Greenwich Line (translated by Katharine Halls)	Marlene L. Daut, The First and Last King of Haiti: The Rise and Fall of Henry Christophe	-

== Best of the James Tait Black (2012) ==
In 2012, a special prize was given called the 'Best of the James Tait Black' (in addition to the normal prize for that year). The award celebrated the fiction winners over the past 93 years, as part of the 250th anniversary of the study of English Literature at the university. A shortlist of six previous winners competed for the title of Best. A judging panel of celebrity alumni and writers decided on the winner, which was announced on 6 December 2012 as Angela Carter's Nights at the Circus.

Shortlist

- Angela Carter, Nights at the Circus (1984)
- Graham Greene, The Heart of the Matter (1948)
- James Kelman, A Disaffection (1989)
- Cormac McCarthy, The Road (2006)
- Caryl Phillips, Crossing the River (1993)
- Muriel Spark, The Mandelbaum Gate (1965)
