= Mary Lavin =

Irish novelist and short story writer (1912–1996)

- Born: 10 June 1912; Walpole, Massachusetts
- Died: 25 March 1996 (aged 83)
- Education: Loreto College
- Alma mater: University College Dublin
- Spouse(s): William Walsh; Michael Scott
- Children: 3
- Writing career
- Genres: Short story; novel
- Notable awards: James Tait Black Memorial Prize; Saoi of Aosdána, 1993

Mary Josephine Lavin (10 June 1912 – 25 March 1996) was an American-born Irish author of short stories and novels, now regarded as a pioneer in the field of women's writing. The well-known Anglo-Irish writer Lord Dunsany mentored Lavin.

Her subject matter often dealt explicitly with concerns of women, as well as a deep Catholic faith (she attended a convent school in Dublin). She is particularly noteworthy for her stories on the topic of widowhood, which are acknowledged to be among her finest. Her husband died in 1954, a little over a decade into their marriage. She remarried in 1969. Her second husband, who before his marriage to Lavin had been living abroad, died in 1991 and she was once again a widow, remaining so until her death five years later.

== Early life and career ==
Mary Lavin was born in East Walpole, Massachusetts, in 1912, the only child of Tom and Nora Lavin, an immigrant Irish couple. She attended primary school in East Walpole until the age of nine when her mother decided to go back to Ireland. Initially, Lavin and Nora lived with Nora's family (the Mahons) in Athenry in County Galway. Afterwards, they bought a house in Dublin, and Lavin's father, too, came back from America to join them.

Lavin attended Loreto College, a convent school in central Dublin, before going on to study English and French at University College Dublin (UCD), graduating with both bachelors and masters degrees. She taught French at Loreto College for a while, and became a PhD student, studying the work of Virginia Woolf. In or about 1937, she gave up her studies and started to write short stories.

According to some accounts, her father approached Lord Dunsany, the well-known Irish writer, who had a home near Bective, and asked him to read some of Lavin's unpublished work. Dunsany met Lavin in autumn 1937 and became her literary mentor. Her first published short story was "Miss Holland", which appeared in The Dublin Magazine in 1939.

In 1942, Lavin's first book was published - this was Tales from Bective Bridge, a volume of ten short stories about life in rural Ireland. The book was a critical success and won the James Tait Black Memorial Prize for fiction. That same year, Lavin married William Walsh, a Dublin lawyer. Over the next decade, the couple had three daughters and moved to "Abbey Farm" in County Meath, which they purchased, and which included the land around Bective Abbey.

Through the later 1940s and into the 1950s, Lavin's literary career flourished; she published several novels and collections of short stories during this period. Her first novel, The House in Clewe Street, was serialised in The Atlantic monthly magazine before its publication in book form in 1945; a second novel, Mary O'Grady, followed.

== Widowhood and later career ==
In 1954, William Walsh died. Lavin, her reputation as a major writer already well established, was left to confront her responsibilities alone. She raised her three daughters and kept the family farm going at the same time. She also managed to keep her literary career on track, continuing to publish short stories and winning several awards for her work, including the Katherine Mansfield Prize in 1961, Guggenheim Fellowships in 1959 and 1961, and an honorary doctorate from UCD in 1968. Some of her stories written during this period, dealing with the topic of widowhood, are acknowledged to be among her finest.

Lavin remarried in 1969. Michael Scott was an old friend from Mary's student days in University College. He had been a Jesuit priest in Australia but had obtained release from his vows from Rome and returned to Ireland. The two remained together until Scott's death in 1991.

In 1992, the members of Aosdána elected Lavin - now retired - Saoi for achieving "singular and sustained distinction" in literature. Aosdána is an affiliation of creative artists in Ireland, and the title of Saoi is one of the highest honours in Irish culture.

One of Lavin's daughters became literary editor of the Irish Times; her granddaughter is the novelist Kathleen MacMahon.

== Legacy ==
In March 2021 a public square, leading from Lad Lane, where she lived for many years, to Wilton Park, near the Grand Canal, was named Mary Lavin Place. It was the first time an Irish woman writer was so honoured. The square opened in October 2024.

== Bibliography ==
- Tales from Bective Bridge, Little, Brown, 1942; Tales From Bective Bridge. Faber & Faber. 15 May 2012. ISBN 978-0-571-29531-9.
- The Long Ago, Michael Joseph, 1944
- The House in Clewe Street, Little, Brown, 1945; Faber & Faber, Limited, 2009, ISBN 9780571256198 (novel)
- The Becker Wives, Michael Joseph, 1946
- At Sallygap, Little, Brown, 1947
- Mary O'Grady, Little, Brown, 1950 (novel)
- A Single Lady, Michael Joseph, 1951
- The Patriot Son, M. Joseph, 1956
- A Likely Story, Macmillan, 1957; Literary Licensing, LLC, 2012, ISBN 9781258335496
- Selected Stories, Macmillan, 1959
- The Great Wave, Macmillan, 1961
- The Stories of Mary Lavin (Volume 1)
- In the Middle of the Fields, Constable, 1967; Macmillan, 1969
- Happiness, Constable, 1969, New Island Books, 2012, ISBN 9781848401044
- The Second Best Children in the World, Houghton Mifflin, 1972, illustrated by Edward Ardizzone ISBN 9780395138960
- Collected stories. Houghton Mifflin. 1971. ISBN 9780395120996.
- A memory and other stories. Houghton Mifflin. 1973. ISBN 9780395171226.
- The Stories of Mary Lavin (Volume 2)
- The Shrine and other stories, Houghton Mifflin, 1977, ISBN 9780395257739
- A family likeness and other stories. Constable. 1985. ISBN 9780094666702.
- A Cup of Tea
- In a Cafe: Selected Stories. Penguin. 1999. ISBN 978-0-14-118040-3.

== See also ==
- List of women writers

== Sources ==
- Bowen, Zack R. Mary Lavin, Bucknell University Press, 1975, ISBN 9780838777626
- Peterson, Richard F.. Mary Lavin, Twayne Publishers, 1978, ISBN 9780805767070
- Kelly, Angeline A. (February 1980). Mary Lavin, quiet rebel: a study of her short stories. Barnes & Noble Books. ISBN 978-0-06-493617-0.; Wolfhound Press, 1997, ISBN 9780863271236
