= Jean Froissard =

Jean Froissard is a French writer and a leading authority on the subject of horsemanship. He has written a number of reference works on the subject, some of them co-written with his wife Lily Powell who is also a novelist. Froissard has been conferred the highest degree of Ecuyer Professeur by the French Equestrian Federation. He lives with his wife in Paris, France.

== Selected works ==
- Classical Horsemanship for Our Time (with Lily Powell)
- A Guide to Basic Dressage
  - The above two books have also been published as one volume entitled The Education of Horse and Rider.
- Equitation: Learning and Teaching
- Jumping: Learning and Teaching
- The Horseman's International Book of Reference (co-editor with Lily Powell)
