= Kathleen MacMahon =

Irish radio and television journalist, and novelist

- Born: Dublin, Ireland
- Occupations: Radio and television journalist, novelist
- Notable work: This Is How It Ends (2012); The Long Hot Summer (2015); nothing but blue sky (2020)
- Relatives: Mary Lavin (grandmother)
- Website: https://kathleenmacmahon.com/

Kathleen MacMahon is an Irish writer and former radio and television journalist who worked with Ireland's national broadcaster, RTÉ She is the author of three novels and numerous short stories.

== Childhood and family ==
Born in Kilkenny, MacMahon is the granddaughter of writer Mary Lavin and the niece of Caroline Walsh, the literary editor of The Irish Times. Her father is Des MacMahon and her mother was Valdi Walsh, who died in November 2010. MacMahon has a brother and sister, Kevin and Meg. MacMahon attended Mount Anville Secondary School in Dublin after her family returned to Ireland from Nicaragua and Brazil. She went on to take degrees at University College Dublin and Cambridge University.

== Career ==
She worked for RTÉ as a radio and television journalist for 15 years before getting her first book published. While working for Morning Ireland, MacMahon won a National Media Award for News and Current Affairs. Five of her years in radio were spent reporting for the RTÉ News at One programme. She made the news herself when the publisher Little, Brown paid £600,000 for the English rights of her first two books.

MacMahon's first book, This Is How It Ends (2012), was translated into 20 languages and shortlisted for a number of awards including the Kerry Group Irish Book of the Year Award, two Bord Gáis Energy Irish Book Awards and the RTÉ Liveline listener's poll for Book of the Year 2012. It was also a Richard and Judy choice in the UK. Her second book, The Long Hot Summer (2015), was also a bestseller. Her third novel Nothing But Blue Sky was published in 2020 by the Sandycove Press imprint of Penguin Books. In March 2021, it was announced that Nothing But Blue Sky had been longlisted for the Women's Prize for Fiction.

== Personal life ==
MacMahon lives in Dublin, with her husband Mark and their twin daughters.

== Bibliography ==
- This Is How It Ends (2012)
- The Long Hot Summer (2015)
- Nothing But Blue Sky (2020)
