= The Woodentops =

British rock band

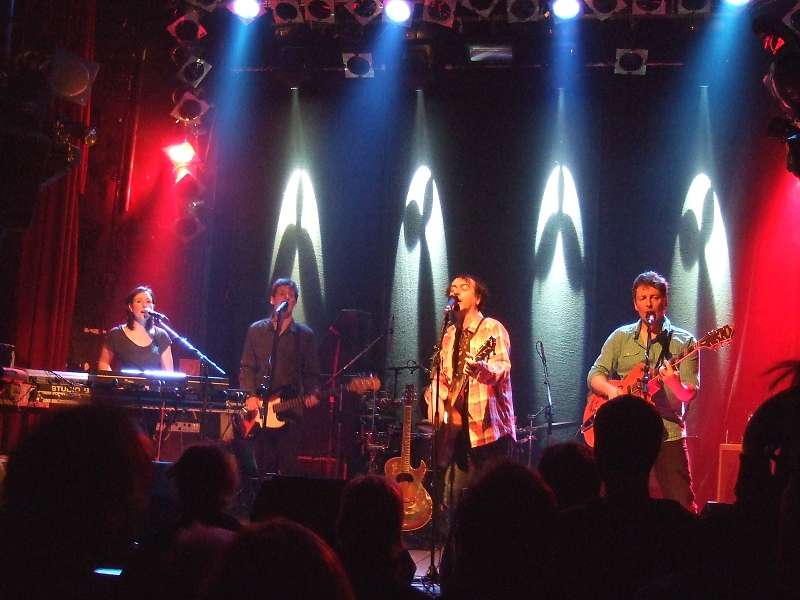
- The Woodentops, performing in Hamburg, 24 February 2010

Background information
- Origin: London, England
- Genres: Alternative rock, indie rock
- Years active: 1983–present
- Labels: Food, Rough Trade, Columbia, Epic, Hyperactive
- Members: Rolo McGinty; Simon Mawby; Aine O'Keeffe; Frank de Freitas; Paul Ashby
- Past members: Paul Hookham; Anne Stephenson; Alice Thompson; Murray Gold; Benny Staples
- Website: Woodentopsmusic.com

The Woodentops are a British rock band that enjoyed critical acclaim and moderate popularity in the mid-1980s.

== History ==
The band formed in 1983 in South London with an initial lineup of Rolo McGinty (vocals, guitar, formerly of the Wild Swans and the Jazz Butcher), Simon Mawby (guitar), Alice Thompson (keyboards), Frank DeFreitas (bass guitar) and Benny Staples replacing Paul Hookham (drums).

After a debut single, "Plenty" on Food Records in 1984, which received a glowing review from Morrissey in Melody Maker, they signed to the independent label Rough Trade Records, releasing a series of singles in 1985 and their debut album Giant in 1986. Generally well-received by critics, the album's sound was characterised by acoustic guitars, but also featured accordion, marimba, strings and trumpet sounds. The album reached No. 35 on the UK Albums Chart. A single from the album, "Good Thing", reached No. 7 on the UK Indie Chart.

The band then became more experimental and frenetic when playing live, using more electronic sounds. This is documented on the live album Live Hypno Beat (1987), recorded in Los Angeles in 1986. The band also started to become rawer and more unpredictable live, becoming one of the most exciting independent groups from the UK, while gaining an early hit on the burgeoning club scene in Ibiza with "Why."

In 1987, Thompson left to be replaced by Anne Stephenson of the Communards. The more experimental mood continued on the second album Wooden Foot Cops on the Highway, released the following year. The song "Stop This Car" was voted No. 15 out of 106 in the KROQ Top 106.7 Countdown of 1988, outperforming many more established acts. Another of the album's standout tracks, "Wheels Turning", became a dancefloor favourite.

The Woodentops continued to play live, touring the world until 1992, and tracks such as "Tainted World" became a regular on New York radio station Kiss FM with DJ Tony Humphries.

Vocalist and guitarist Rolo McGinty, who also wrote all of the Woodentops' songs, resurfaced with the DJ band Pluto in the 1990s and the Dogs Deluxe electronica project, and also provided vocals for Gary Lucas's Gods and Monsters. Guitarist Simon Mawby was briefly a member of the House of Love in the early 1990s.

The Woodentops returned to live performances in September 2006. In October 2009, they performed in a special concert at the Queen Elizabeth Hall in London's South Bank. There, they also curated an exhibition of works by artist Panni Bharti and concerts by musicians Worm, Othon and Ernesto Tomasini. In 2010, the band announced their first single in 20 years and played a string of dates across Europe.

In 2014 they released Granular Tales, their first album of new music since 1988's Wooden Foot Cops on the Highway. Ten years later, they self-released another album of new music, Fruits of the Deep, which they supported with a limited UK tour.

Present lineup

- Rolo McGinty - vocals, guitar
- Simon Mawby - guitar
- Aine O'Keeffe - keyboards
- Frank de Freitas - bass guitar
- Paul Ashby - drums

== Discography ==
=== Albums ===
==== Studio albums ====
Title	Album details	Peak chart positions	
Title	Album details	UK	UK Indie
Giant	Released: June 1986; Label: Rough Trade; Formats: CD, LP, MC	35	2
Wooden Foot Cops on the Highway	Released: February 1988; Label: Rough Trade; Formats: CD, LP, MC	48	1
Granular Tales	Released: 24 February 2014; Label: Cherry Red; Formats: CD, digital download	—	—
Fruits of the Deep	Released: 22 April 2024; Label: Little People Big Music [self-released]; Formats: CD, digital download	—	—
"—" denotes releases that did not chart or were not released in that territory.

==== Mini albums ====
Title	Album details
Straight Eight Bush-Waker	Released: 1985; Label: Rough Trade, Megadisc; Formats: CD, LP, MC

==== Live albums ====
Title	Album details	Peak chart positions
Title	Album details	UK Indie
Live Hypnobeat Live	Released: 13 April 1987; Label: Rough Trade; Formats: CD, LP, MC	1
Live Tokyo	Released: 13 April 2019; Label: Self-released; Formats: 2xCD; Japan-only limited release	—
"—" denotes releases that did not chart or were not released in that territory.

==== Compilation albums ====
Title	Album details
Well, Well, Well... The Unabridged Singles Collection	Released: 1986; Label: Upside; Formats: CD, LP, MC; US-only release
Bamboo ～ The Best of the Woodentops – The Rough Trade Anthology	Released: 29 January 2003; Label: Felicity; Formats: CD; Japan-only release
Vinegar	Released: 2006; Label: Self-released; Formats: CD; Sold only at live shows
The BBC Sessions	Released: 8 October 2007; Label: Renascent; Formats: CD
Before During After – Remasters Remixes & Rarities 1982–1992	Released: 27 May 2013; Label: One Little Indian; Formats: 3xCD, digital download

==== Video albums ====
Title	Album details
Live at Full House	Released: 1989; Label: Meldac; Formats: VHS; Japan-only split album with the Comsat Angels

=== Singles ===
Title	Year	Peak chart positions		Albums
Title	Year	UK	UK Indie	Albums
"Plenty"	1984	—	40	Non-album single
"Move Me"	1985	—	9	Straight Eight Bush-Waker
"Well Well Well"	1985	—	1	Straight Eight Bush-Waker
"It WiIl Come"	1985	—	4	Straight Eight Bush-Waker
"Good Thing"	1986	—	7	Giant
"Everyday Living"	1986	72	1	Giant
"Get It On" (France-only release)	1986	—	—	Giant
"Give It Time" (US-only release)	1987	—	—	Giant
"You Make Me Feel"/"Stop This Car"	1988	80	4	Wooden Foot Cops on the Highway
"Wheels Turning"	1988	—	—	Wooden Foot Cops on the Highway
"Tainted World" (The Woodentops v Bang the Party)	1991	—	—	Non-album single
"Children of Today"/"Don't" & "Conehead"	1991	—	—	Non-album single WT 001
"Third Floor Rooftop High" (promo-only release)	2013	—	—	Granular Tales
"Why Why Why" (remixes)	2016	—	—	Non-album single
"Dream On"	2024	—	—	Fruits of the Deep
"—" denotes releases that did not chart or were not released in that territory.
