= Bective Abbey =

Ruined Cistercian abbey in Meath, Ireland

Coordinates: 53°34′57″N 06°42′10″W

- Mainistir Bheigthí
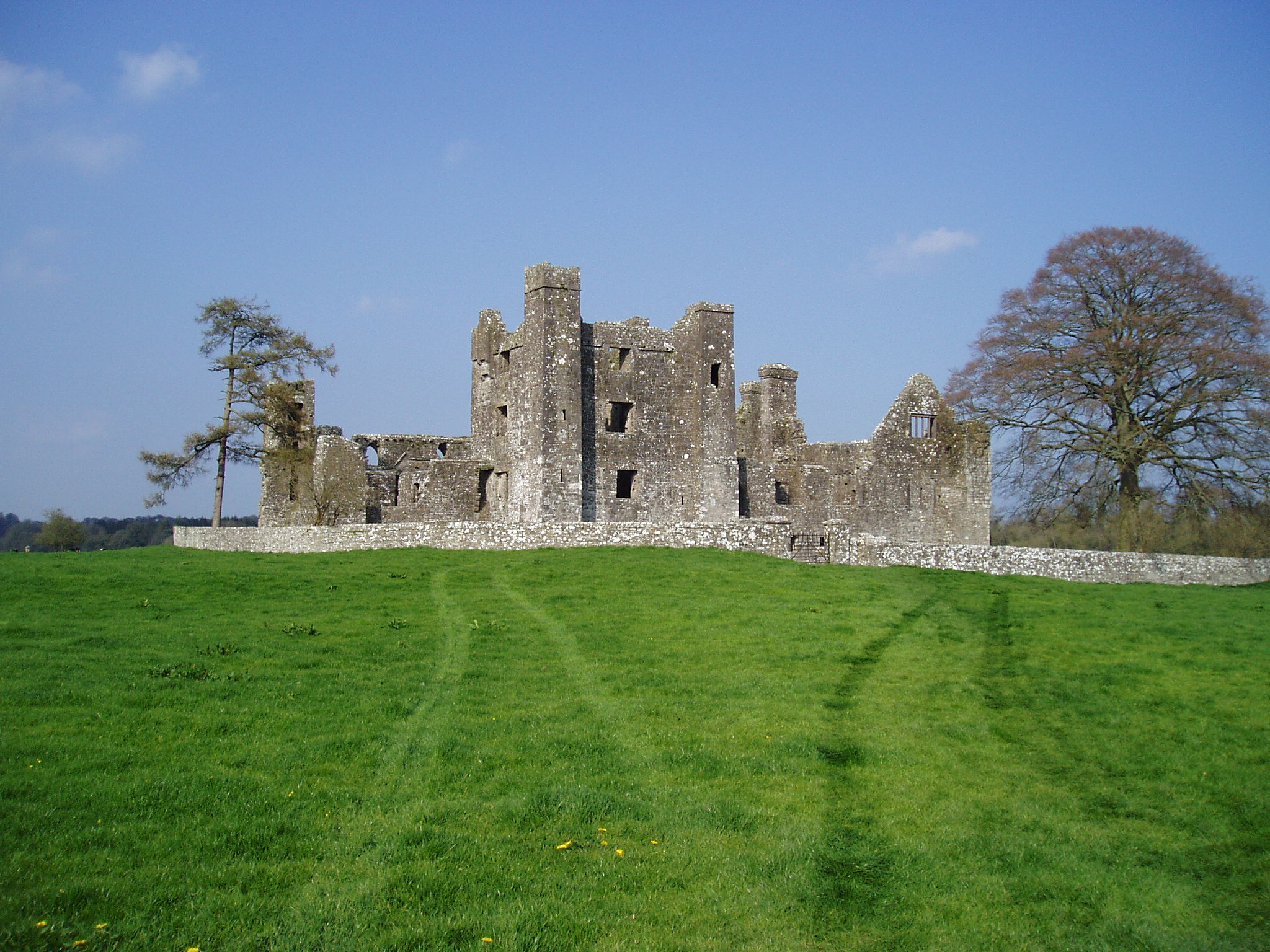

Monastery information
- Order: Cistercian
- Established: 1147
- Disestablished: c.1530

People
- Founder(s): Murchad O'Maeil-Sheachlainn

Architecture
- Status: Inactive

Site
- Public access: Yes

National monument of Ireland
- Official name: Bective Abbey
- Reference no.: 187

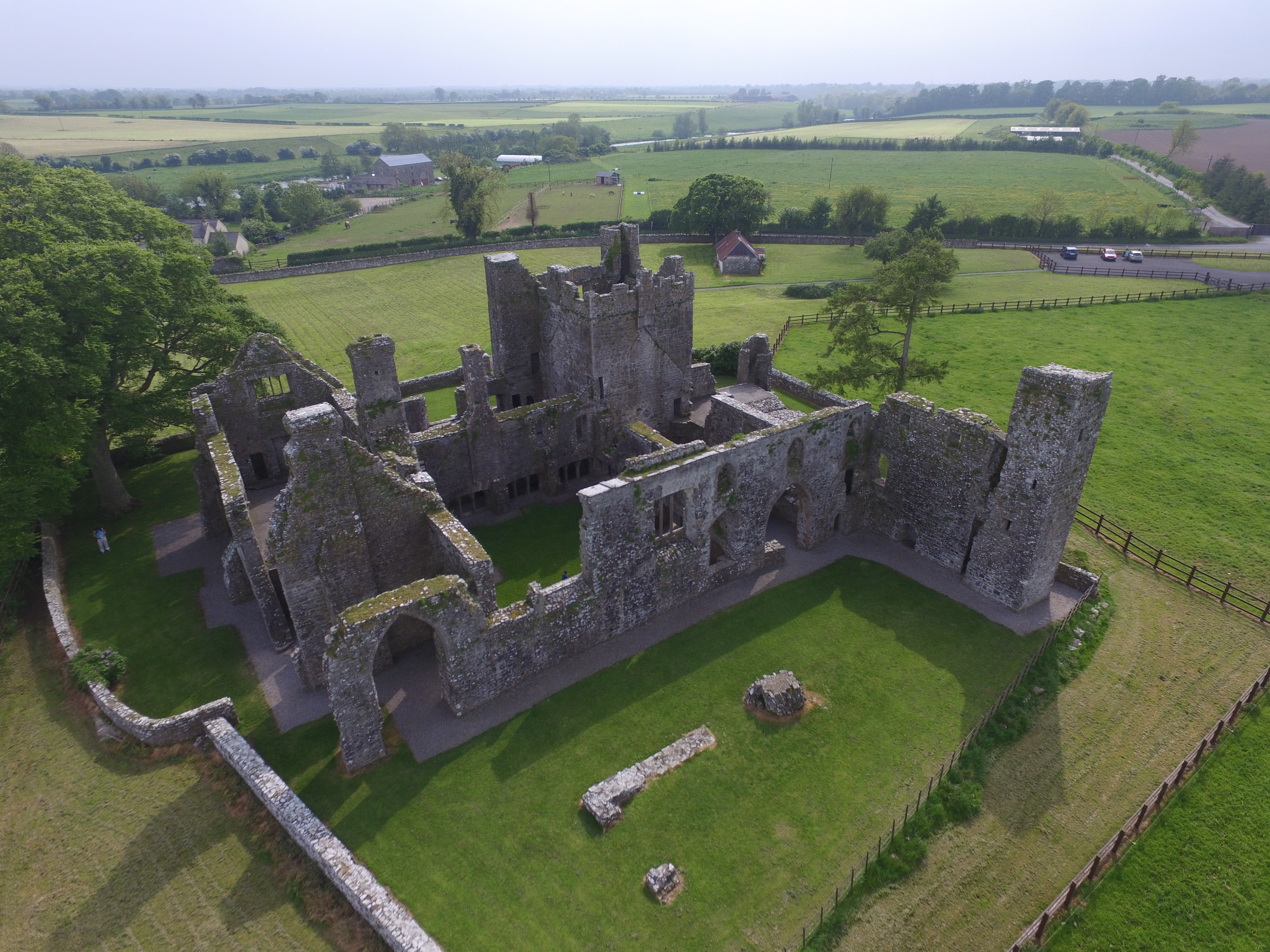
Bective Abbey from the sky

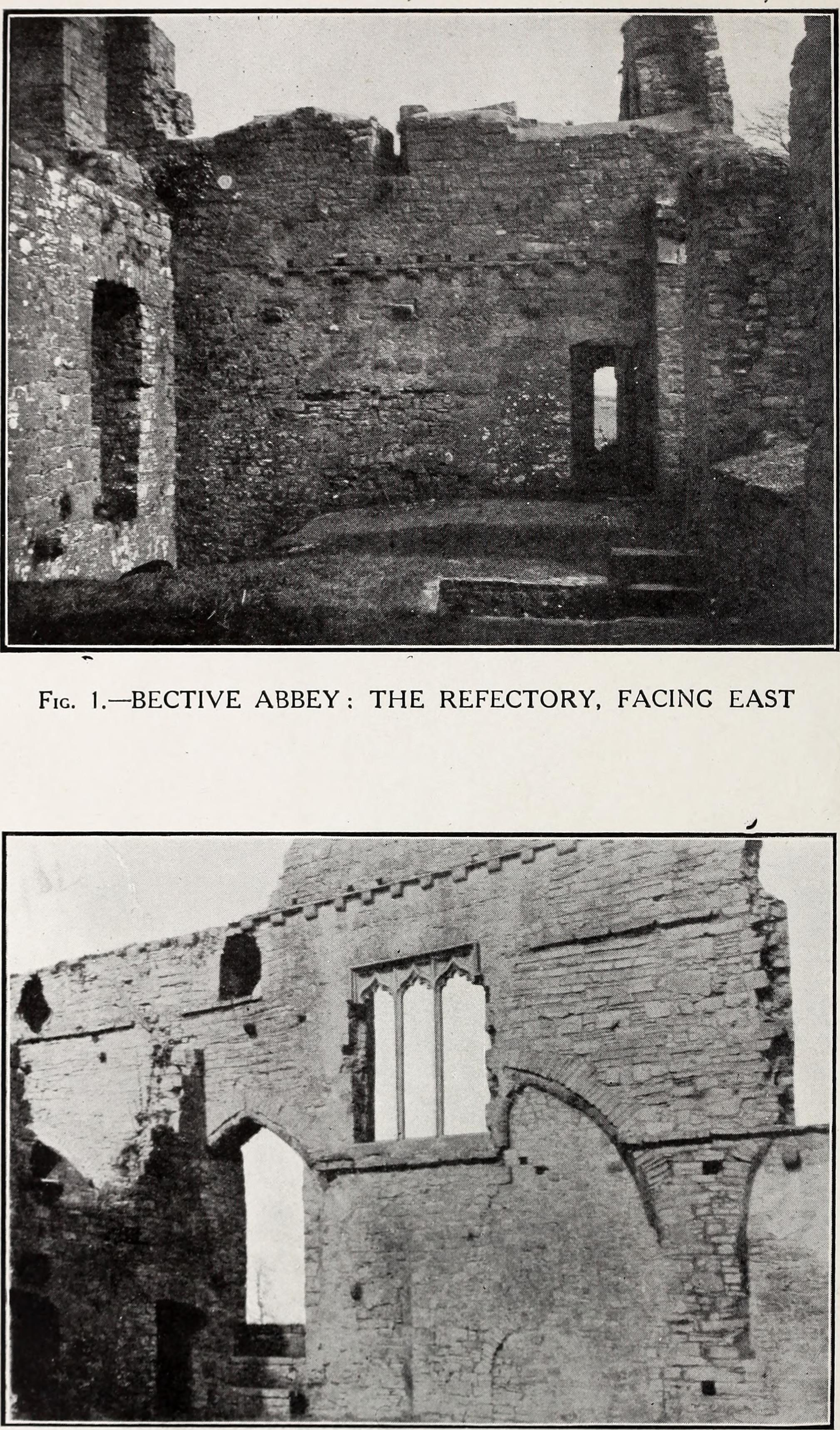
Bective Abbey in 1916.

Bective Abbey (Irish: Mainistir Bheigthí) is a Cistercian abbey on the River Boyne in Bective, County Meath, Ireland.

The abbey was founded in 1147, and the remaining (well-preserved) structure and ruins primarily date to the 15th century. The site, including a nearby car park, were purchased by the state in 2012, and are managed by the Office of Public Works. The abbey, including its early 13th-century church, 15th-century cloister, and 16th-century tower, is a protected structure and recorded on the register of National monuments of Ireland.

== History ==
The abbey was founded in 1147 by Murchad O'Maeil-Sheachlainn, as a 'daughter house' of Mellifont Abbey. The abbey and its estate lands were confiscated during the Dissolution of the Monasteries in the 1530s, before being rented to Thomas Asgarde, and later purchased by Andrew Wyse in 1552. Around this time the estate lands were surveyed, and recorded at 1580 acres. During the 17th century, the abbey buildings were partially converted for use as a manor house.

The site was taken into state care, and named a protected structure and National Monument. Bective Abbey was subject to a number of excavations in the early 21st century, and made more accessible to visitors around this time.

== In popular culture ==
Bective Abbey was used as a location during the shooting of the 1995 historical action-drama movie Braveheart.

== Gallery ==
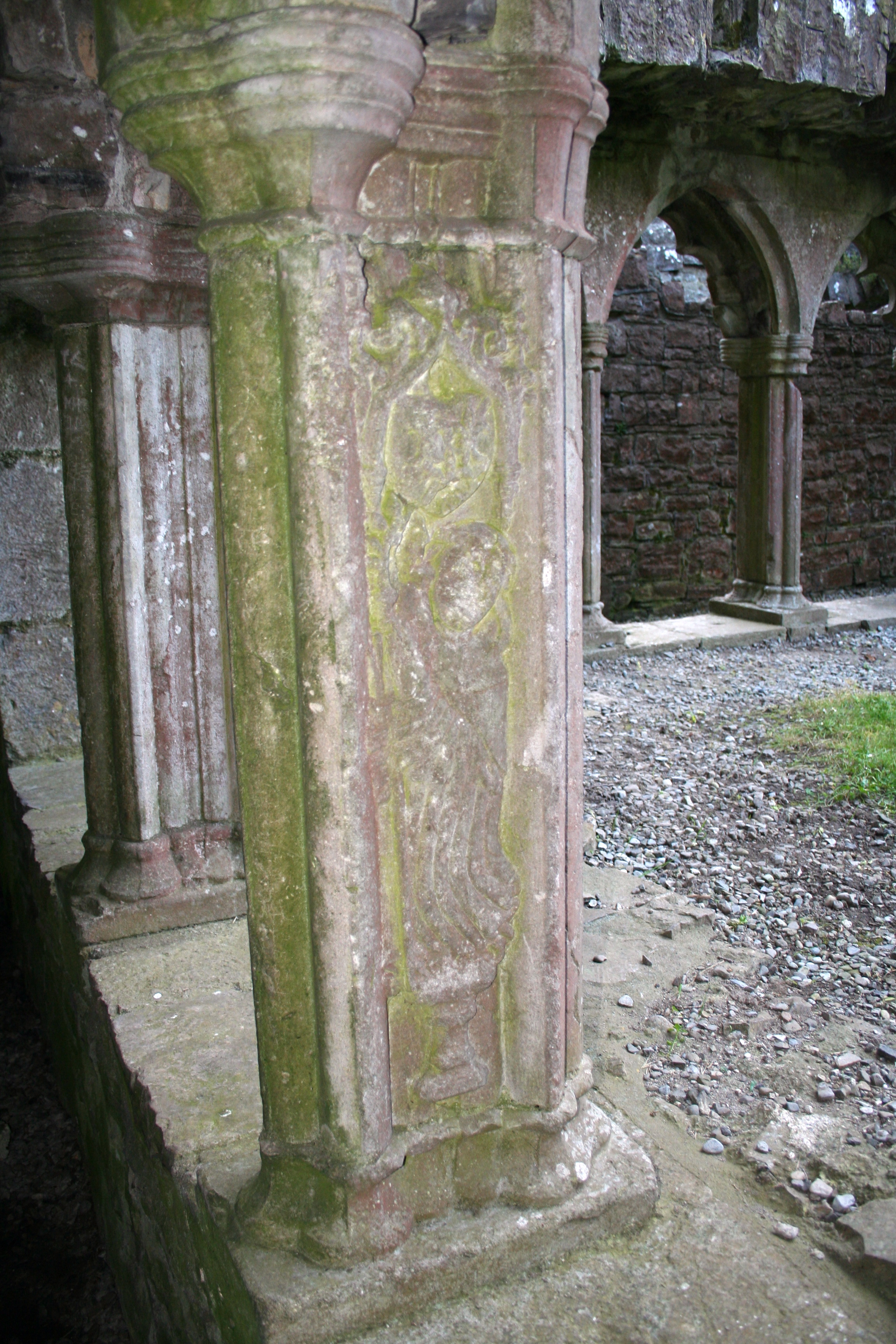
Column

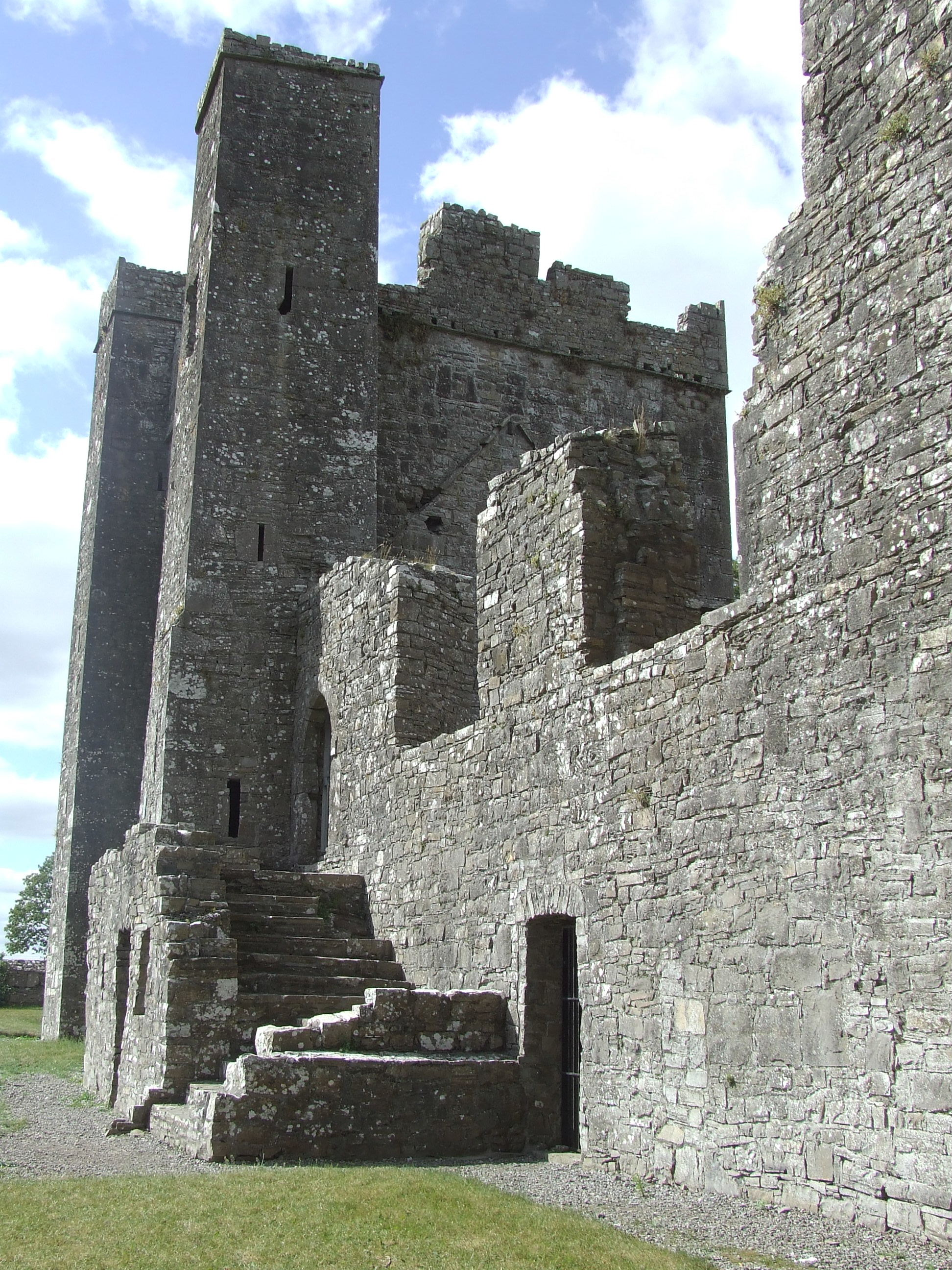
Side of Bective Abbey

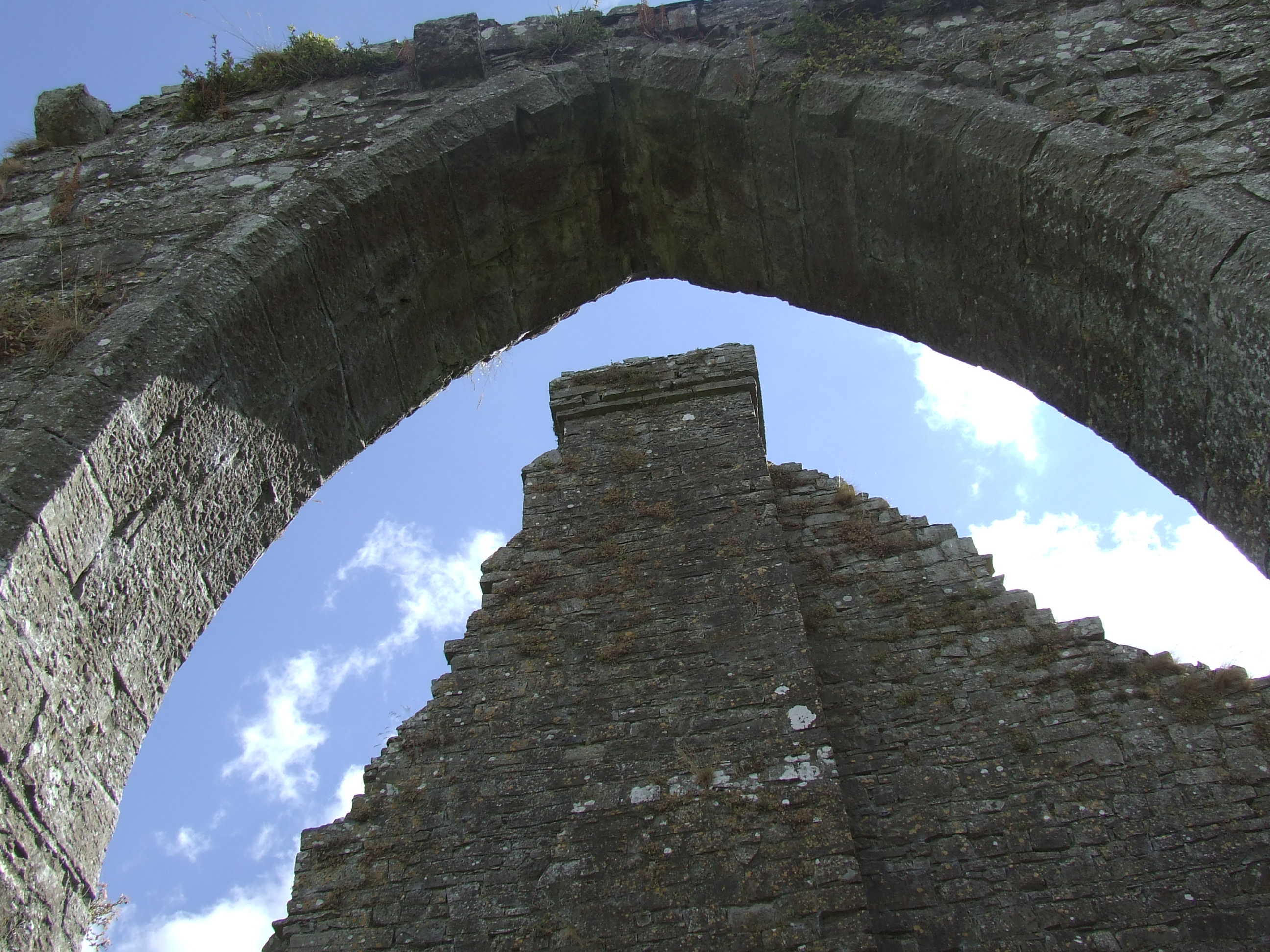
Arch at the Abbey

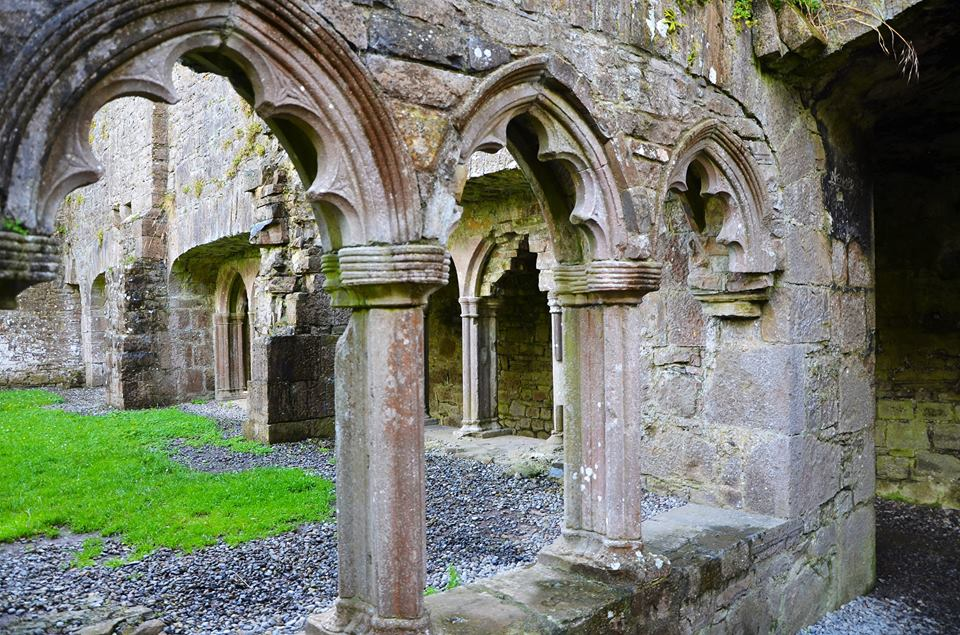
Cloisters

== See also ==
- List of abbeys and priories in Ireland, (County Meath)
