= Alice Thompson =

Scottish novelist

Alice Thompson (born in Edinburgh) is a Scottish novelist.

Thompson was educated at St George's School, Edinburgh, then read English at Oxford University and wrote her Ph.D. thesis on Henry James. In the 1980s she was the keyboard player with rock band The Woodentops. She has a son, and lives in Edinburgh. Her novel Justine was the joint winner of the 1996 James Tait Black Memorial Prize. She also won a Creative Scotland Award in 2000, and was a Writer in Residence in Shetland.

== Novels ==
- Killing Time (1990) - novella
- Justine (1996)
- Pandora's Box (1998)
- Pharos: A Ghost Story (2002)
- The Falconer (2008)
- The Existential Detective (2010)
- Burnt Island (2013)
- The Book Collector (2015)
- Chimera (2023)

== Critical reception ==
"Their romance had been like a fairytale. If only she could work out which fairytale it was, it would somehow help her." Will it be The Red Shoes, whose heroine is danced to death, punished by her worldly thoughts, or Mr Fox, whose wife is enjoined to "Be bold, be bold, but not too bold"? Or maybe it's a modern tale, such as Rebecca, with its saturnine hero obsessed with a dead wife and a ghastly secret."

"THERE is a distinctive ambience to an Alice Thompson novel. From Justine, her debut which won the James Tait Black Memorial Prize, through Pandora's Box, Pharos, The Falconer, The Existential Detective and Burnt Island, there is a kind of gothic postmodernism."

"A genuinely eerie tale, in a perfect setting and told with just the right amount of ambiguity."

"Some books evoke a particular piece of music, others, a particular color. The Falconer (2008) by Alice Thompson reminded me of a painting in Glasgow's Kelvingrove Art Gallery, which fascinated me as a child. The Fairy Raid (1867) by Scottish pre-Raphaelite Noel Paton depicts a fairy caravan traveling through a grove with a bounty of stolen children, having left changelings in their stead. It's an enchanting, overtly romantic work, but death and duplicity hide in the shadows, symbolizing the Victorian fear of high childhood mortality."
